= List of Bangladesh provinces by life expectancy =

Bangladesh is the eighth-most populated country in the world, accounting for approximately 2.2% of the global population. According to the final results of the 2022 Census of Bangladesh, the country's population was 169,828,911.

According to estimation of the United Nations, in 2023 life expectancy in Bangladesh was 74.67 years (73.03 for male, 76.37 for female). For comparison, life expectancy in the world was 73.17.

== Administrative units of Bangladesh by Life Expectancy at Birth ==
This is the list of Provinces and administrative units of Bangladesh by Life Expectancy at Birth as of 2023
