= List of U.S. states and territories by life expectancy =

The remaining life expectancy is the expected remaining number of years of life as a function of current age. Life expectancy at birth is indicated above the "0" current age. 2020 statistics.

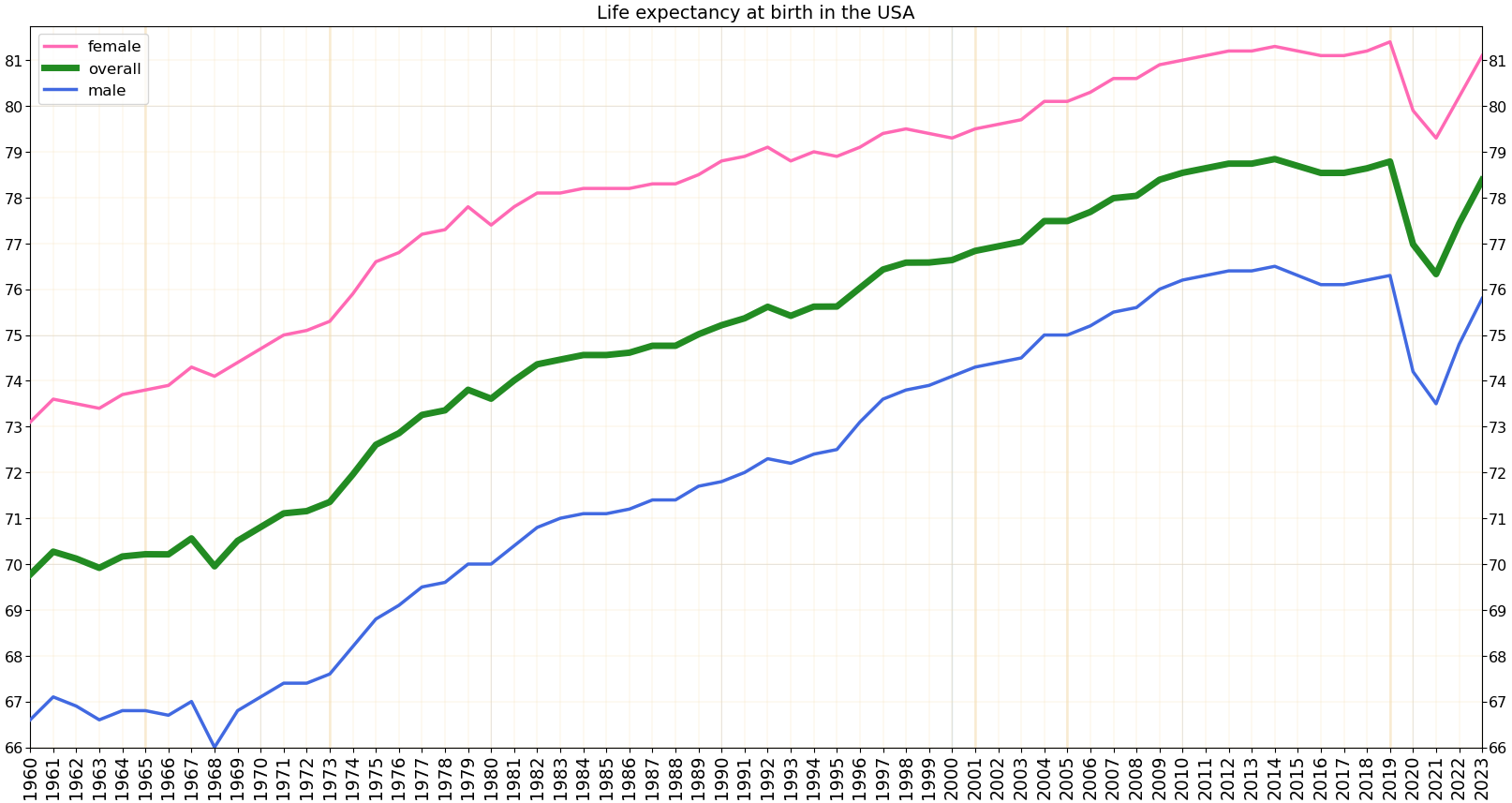
US life expectancy, World Bank Group, 1960–2023.

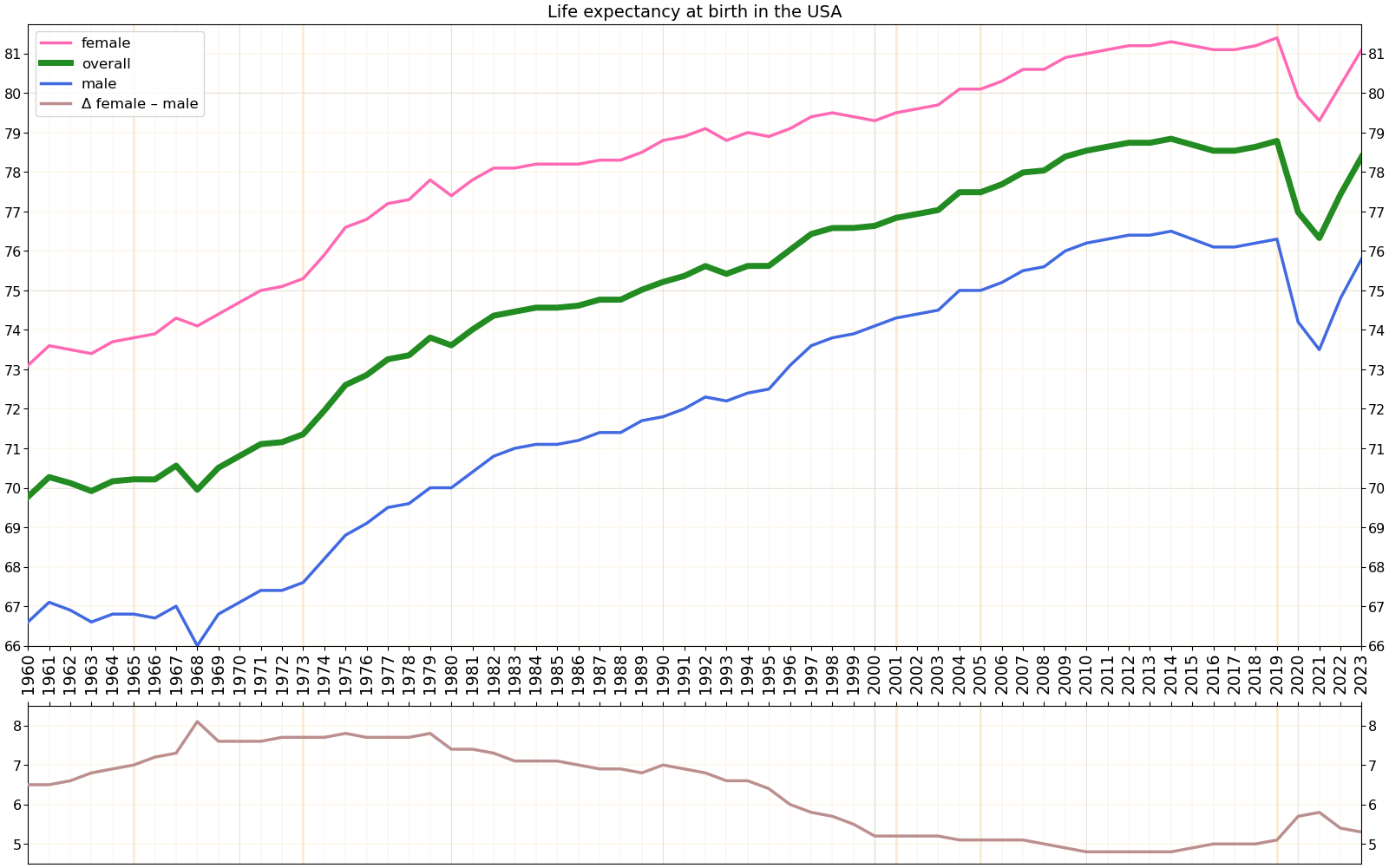
US life expectancy by sex, 1960–2023.

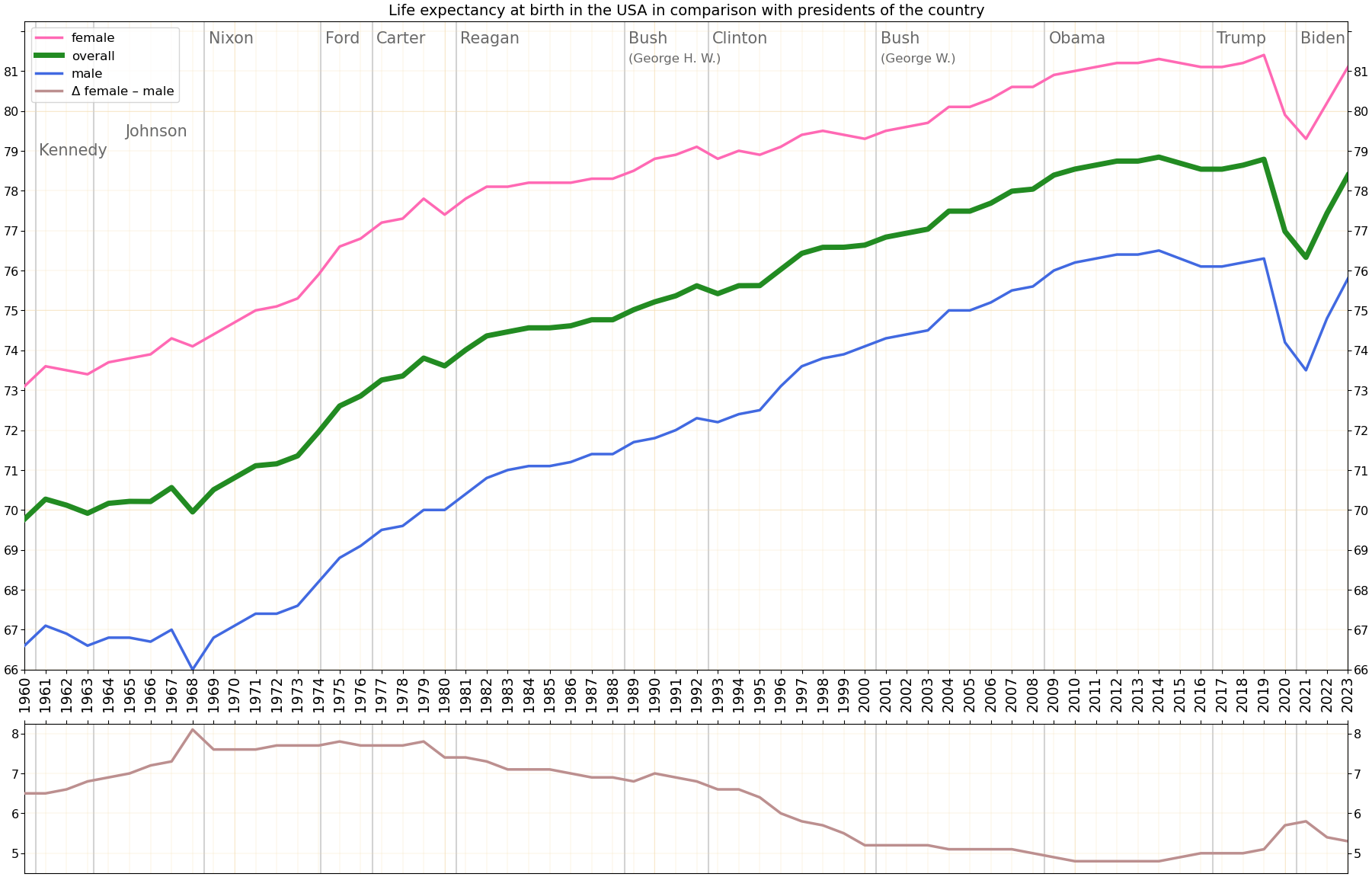
US life expectancy in comparison to the US President, 1960–2023.

U.S. life expectancy, 1880–2021, Our World in Data.

US life expectancy by state, 2020.

This article presents a list of United States states and territories sorted by their life expectancy at birth, by sex, by race, and in the past.

According to a 2023 estimate by the United Nations, the life expectancy in the US during 2023 was 79.30 years (76.86 for males, 81.85 for females). During the same year, the World Bank Group calculated 78.39 years (75.80 for male, 81.10 for female).

According to the WHO's 2019 estimation, life expectancy in the US was 78.74 years (76.53 years for males, 80.98 years for females).
The healthy life expectancy was 66.02 years (65.13 years for males, 66.93 years for females). States with the highest life expectancy included California, Hawaii, New York, Minnesota, Massachusetts, and Connecticut. At the bottom of the list were Tennessee, Kentucky, Alabama, West Virginia, and Mississippi.

== History ==
The life expectancy has fallen in recent years in some states. For example, Maine's life expectancy in 2010 was 79.1 years; in 2018, it was 78.7 years. In 2018, US life expectancy had a slight increase of 0.1, returning it to 2010 levels. However, by November, overall life expectancy in the United States was again declining.

== Methodology ==
The data in the 2018 column is from work funded by the Robert Wood Johnson Foundation for the 50 states and the District of Columbia, from the World Bank for Guam, Puerto Rico and the U.S. Virgin Islands, and from the CIA World Factbook for American Samoa and the Northern Mariana Islands. Data in the 2010 columns comes from Health Data.

== National Center for Health Statistics (2021–2023) ==
The below table compares the life expectancy at birth in each U.S. state and the District of Columbia from 2021 to 2023 as according to the National Center for Health Statistics.

state	2021				2011 →2022	2022				2022 →2023	2023				2021 →2023
state	overall	male	female	F Δ M	2011 →2022	overall	male	female	F Δ M	2022 →2023	overall	male	female	F Δ M	2021 →2023
US on average	76.4	73.5	79.3	5.8	1.1	77.5	74.8	80.2	5.4	0.9	78.4	75.8	81.1	5.3	2.0
Hawaii	79.9	77.0	83.1	6.1	0.1	80.0	77.1	83.0	5.9	0.6	80.6	77.7	83.8	6.1	0.7
New Jersey	79.0	76.3	81.6	5.3	0.6	79.6	77.1	82.0	4.9	1.0	80.6	78.3	83.0	4.7	1.6
Massachusetts	79.6	76.9	82.2	5.3	0.2	79.8	77.4	82.2	4.8	0.7	80.5	78.2	82.9	4.7	0.9
New York	79.0	76.3	81.6	5.3	0.5	79.5	76.9	82.1	5.2	0.9	80.4	78.0	83.0	5.0	1.4
Connecticut	79.2	76.3	82.0	5.7	0.2	79.4	76.8	82.1	5.3	1.0	80.4	77.9	82.9	5.0	1.2
California	78.3	75.3	81.4	6.1	1.0	79.3	76.7	82.1	5.4	0.9	80.2	77.7	83.0	5.3	1.9
Minnesota	78.8	76.3	81.4	5.1	0.5	79.3	77.0	81.6	4.6	0.7	80.0	77.9	82.2	4.3	1.2
Rhode Island	78.5	75.9	81.0	5.1	0.7	79.2	76.6	81.8	5.2	0.5	79.7	77.3	82.0	4.7	1.2
Utah	78.2	76.3	80.2	3.9	0.8	79.0	77.3	80.9	3.6	0.6	79.6	77.7	81.5	3.8	1.4
New Hampshire	78.5	76.1	81.1	5.0	0.2	78.7	76.5	81.0	4.5	0.8	79.5	77.3	81.7	4.4	1.0
Colorado	77.7	75.0	80.6	5.6	0.8	78.5	76.1	81.0	4.9	0.8	79.3	76.8	81.9	5.1	1.6
Idaho	77.2	74.8	79.7	4.9	1.2	78.4	76.4	80.6	4.2	0.8	79.2	77.1	81.4	4.3	2.0
Texas	75.4	72.7	78.3	5.6	1.7	77.1	74.6	79.8	5.2	2.0	79.1	76.7	81.7	5.0	3.7
Washington (state)	78.2	75.8	80.8	5.0	0.2	78.4	76.1	80.9	4.8	0.6	79.0	76.5	81.6	5.1	0.8
Vermont	78.4	75.7	81.2	5.5	-0.1	78.3	75.8	80.8	5.0	0.7	79.0	76.4	81.7	5.3	0.6
Wisconsin	77.8	75.2	80.5	5.3	0.3	78.1	75.7	80.7	5.0	0.8	78.9	76.6	81.3	4.7	1.1
Florida	76.1	73.1	79.3	6.2	1.8	77.9	75.2	80.7	5.5	0.9	78.8	76.1	81.6	5.5	2.7
North Dakota	77.6	75.0	80.5	5.5	0.3	77.9	75.4	80.8	5.4	0.9	78.8	76.2	81.6	5.4	1.2
Nebraska	77.8	75.4	80.3	4.9	0.5	78.3	76.0	80.7	4.7	0.4	78.7	76.5	81.0	4.5	0.9
Maryland	77.2	74.3	79.9	5.6	0.6	77.8	75.1	80.5	5.4	0.9	78.7	76.0	81.4	5.4	1.5
Iowa	77.7	75.2	80.4	5.2	0.2	77.9	75.6	80.4	4.8	0.7	78.6	76.3	81.1	4.8	0.9
Illinois	77.1	74.2	80.0	5.8	0.4	77.5	74.9	80.3	5.4	1.1	78.6	76.0	81.4	5.4	1.5
Virginia	76.8	74.2	79.4	5.2	0.7	77.5	75.0	79.9	4.9	1.0	78.5	76.1	80.9	4.8	1.7
South Dakota	76.6	74.1	79.3	5.2	0.7	77.3	75.2	79.5	4.3	1.1	78.4	76.3	80.7	4.4	1.8
Montana	75.8	73.1	78.8	5.7	1.5	77.3	74.9	80.0	5.1	1.0	78.3	76.3	80.3	4.0	2.5
Pennsylvania	76.4	73.6	79.3	5.7	0.9	77.3	74.7	79.9	5.2	1.0	78.3	75.8	80.9	5.1	1.9
Oregon	77.4	74.8	80.2	5.4	0.3	77.7	75.2	80.4	5.2	0.5	78.2	75.5	81.1	5.6	0.8
Arizona	75.0	72.0	78.3	6.3	1.7	76.7	73.7	79.9	6.2	1.2	77.9	75.1	80.9	5.8	2.9
Maine	76.7	73.8	79.8	6.0	-0.1	76.6	73.9	79.6	5.7	1.2	77.8	75.2	80.4	5.2	1.1
Michigan	75.7	72.9	78.6	5.7	1.1	76.8	74.3	79.3	5.0	1.0	77.8	75.4	80.3	4.9	2.1
Wyoming	75.0	72.5	77.7	5.2	1.8	76.8	74.6	79.3	4.7	1.0	77.8	75.8	80.0	4.2	2.8
Delaware	76.3	73.3	79.4	6.1	0.2	76.5	73.6	79.5	5.9	1.2	77.7	74.9	80.5	5.6	1.4
Kansas	76.0	73.4	78.7	5.3	0.5	76.5	74.1	78.9	4.8	1.1	77.6	75.3	80.1	4.8	1.6
Nevada	75.1	72.4	78.2	5.8	1.3	76.4	74.0	79.1	5.1	0.9	77.3	74.6	80.4	5.8	2.2
Washington, D.C.	75.3	71.9	78.5	6.6	1.3	76.6	73.3	79.6	6.3	0.7	77.3	74.4	80.0	5.6	2.0
Georgia	74.3	71.6	77.1	5.5	1.6	75.9	73.1	78.6	5.5	1.0	76.9	74.3	79.5	5.2	2.6
North Carolina	74.9	72.0	77.9	5.9	1.0	75.9	73.0	78.7	5.7	0.9	76.8	74.1	79.6	5.5	1.9
Ohio	74.5	71.7	77.5	5.8	1.1	75.6	73.0	78.3	5.3	1.2	76.8	74.2	79.5	5.3	2.3
Indiana	74.6	71.8	77.5	5.7	0.8	75.4	72.7	78.2	5.5	1.2	76.6	74.0	79.3	5.3	2.0
Missouri	74.6	71.6	77.8	6.2	0.6	75.2	72.5	78.1	5.6	1.3	76.5	73.8	79.4	5.6	1.9
Alaska	74.5	72.2	77.3	5.1	1.3	75.8	73.7	78.3	4.6	0.5	76.3	73.9	79.0	5.1	1.8
South Carolina	73.5	70.4	76.7	6.3	1.6	75.1	72.2	78.1	5.9	1.1	76.2	73.3	79.1	5.8	2.7
New Mexico	73.0	69.4	77.0	7.6	1.5	74.5	71.2	78.1	6.9	1.2	75.7	72.3	79.3	7.0	2.7
Oklahoma	72.7	70.0	75.6	5.6	1.1	73.8	71.3	76.5	5.2	1.3	75.1	72.6	77.7	5.1	2.4
Tennessee	72.4	69.4	75.5	6.1	1.4	73.8	70.9	76.9	6.0	1.1	74.9	72.0	77.8	5.8	2.5
Arkansas	72.5	69.7	75.6	5.9	1.4	73.9	71.3	76.6	5.3	0.9	74.8	72.1	77.6	5.5	2.3
Louisiana	72.2	68.8	75.9	7.1	1.6	73.8	70.6	77.2	6.6	1.0	74.8	71.5	78.1	6.6	2.6
Kentucky	72.3	69.6	75.3	5.7	1.3	73.6	71.1	76.2	5.1	1.0	74.6	72.1	77.3	5.2	2.3
Alabama	72.0	68.9	75.3	6.4	1.8	73.8	70.8	77.0	6.2	0.8	74.6	71.5	77.7	6.2	2.6
West Virginia	71.0	68.1	74.2	6.1	1.2	72.2	69.5	75.1	5.6	1.7	73.9	71.2	76.7	5.5	2.9
Mississippi	70.9	67.7	74.3	6.6	1.7	72.6	69.5	75.7	6.2	1.2	73.8	70.7	76.5	5.8	2.9

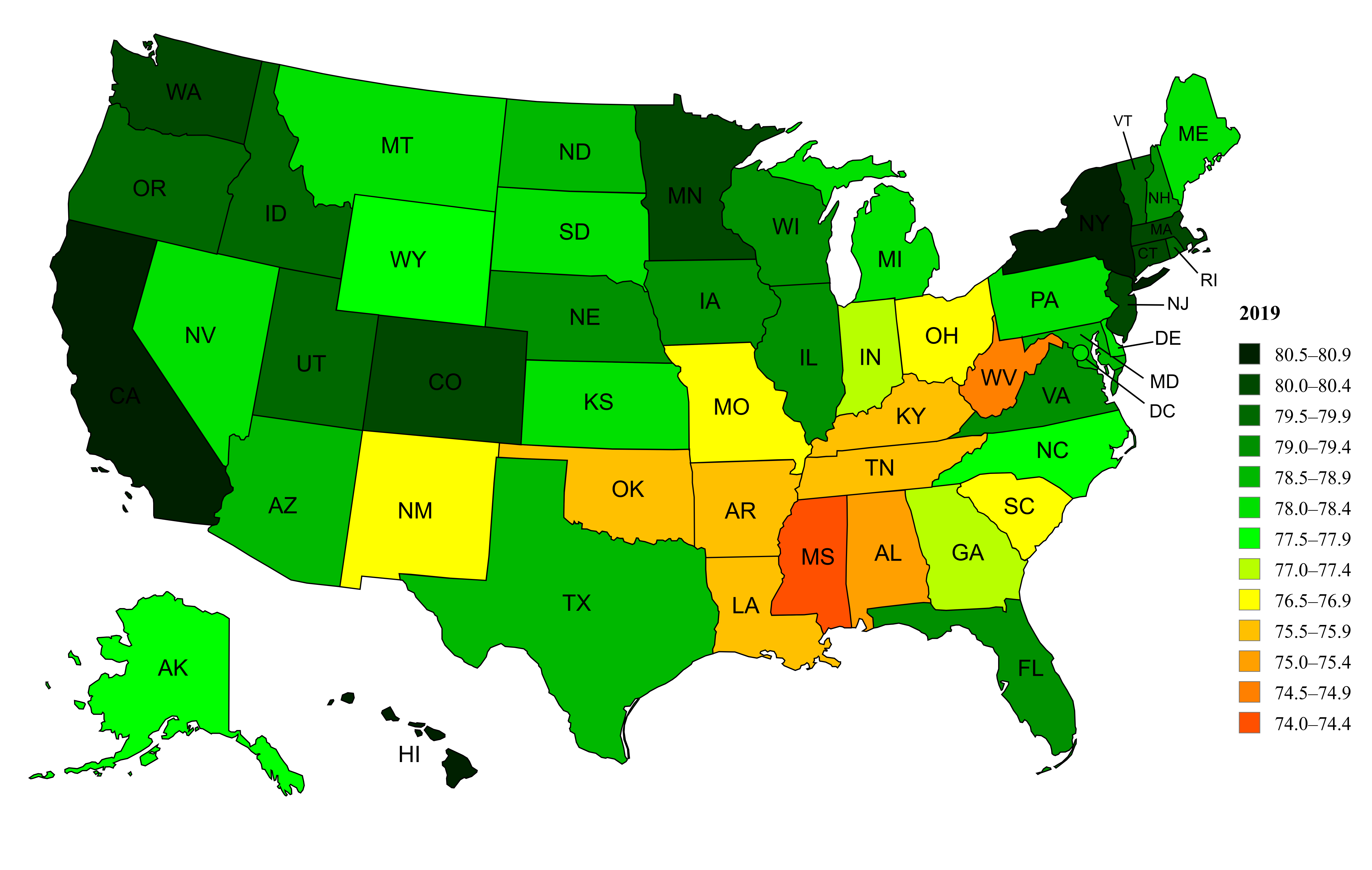
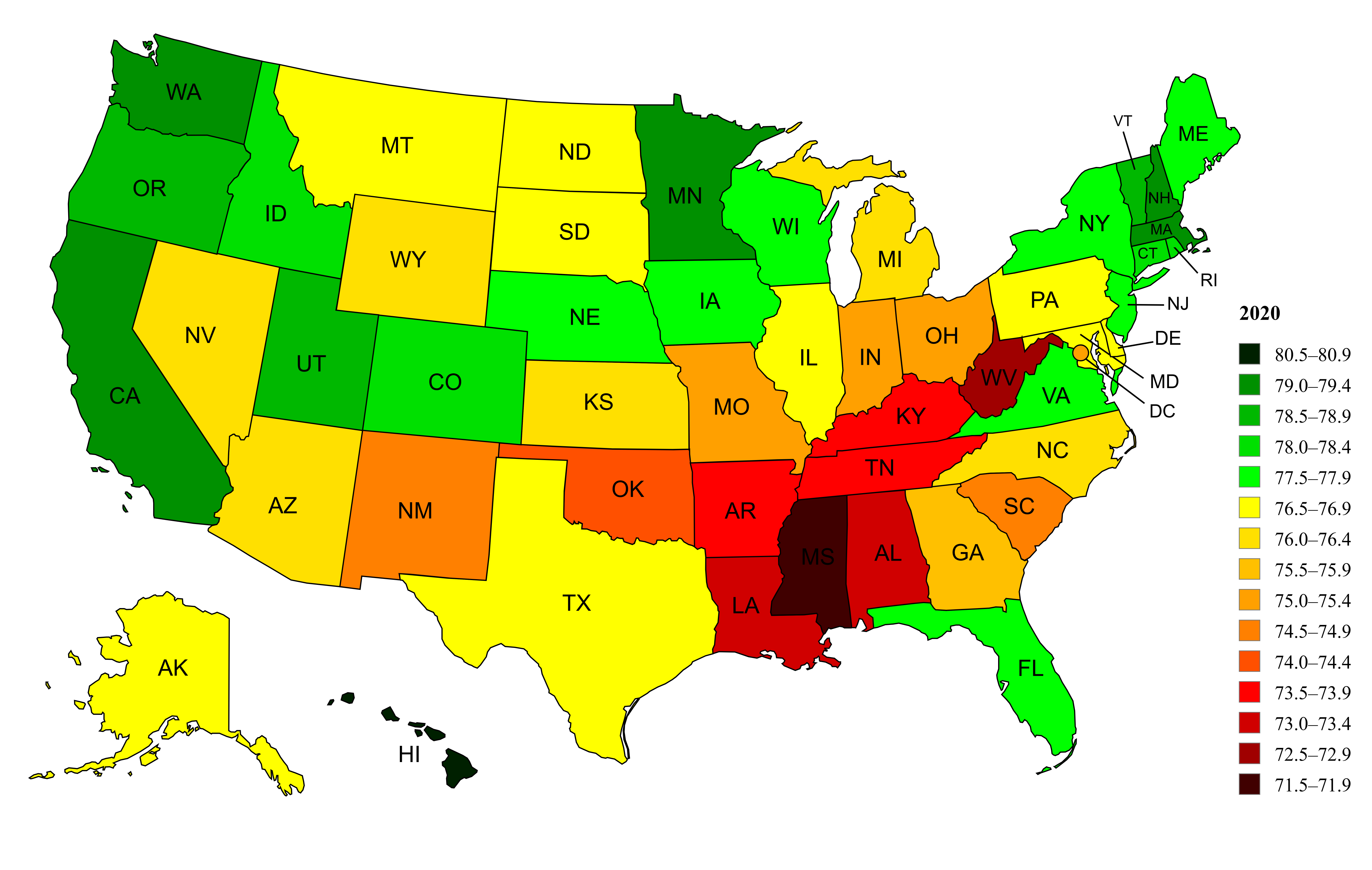
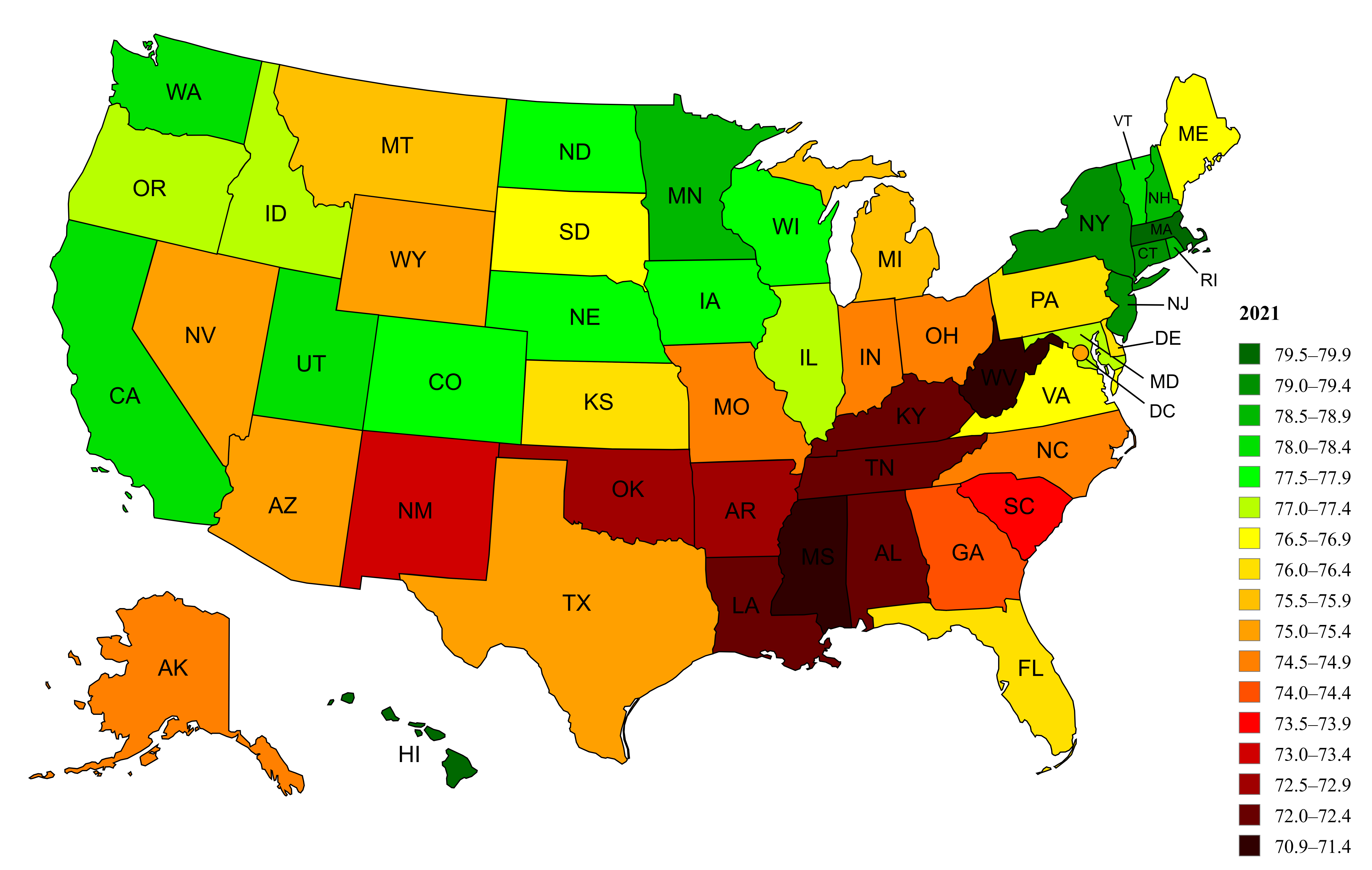
U.S. life expectancy by state, 2019–2021.

== US Mortality DataBase (2014–2021) ==
By default, the table is sorted by 2019.

State / Territory	2014				2014 →2019	2019				2019 →2020	2020				2020 →2021	2021				2019 →2021
State / Territory	All	Male	Female	F Δ M	2014 →2019	All	Male	Female	F Δ M	2019 →2020	All	Male	Female	F Δ M	2020 →2021	All	Male	Female	F Δ M	2019 →2021
United States	78.89	76.46	81.25	4.79	0.02	78.91	76.40	81.43	5.03	−1.86	77.05	74.32	79.88	5.56	−0.60	76.45	73.63	79.41	5.78	−2.46
Hawaii	81.46	78.63	84.19	5.56	0.14	81.60	78.63	84.60	5.97	0.04	81.64	78.60	84.71	6.11	−0.75	80.89	77.85	84.10	6.25	−0.71
California	81.04	78.73	83.26	4.53	0.11	81.15	78.69	83.60	4.91	−1.91	79.24	76.44	82.16	5.72	−0.66	78.58	75.59	81.74	6.15	−2.57
New York	80.69	78.27	82.90	4.63	0.37	81.06	78.54	83.43	4.89	−2.81	78.25	75.32	81.19	5.87	1.18	79.43	76.68	82.12	5.44	−1.63
Minnesota	80.90	78.84	82.89	4.05	−0.23	80.67	78.45	82.90	4.45	−1.38	79.29	77.03	81.62	4.59	−0.30	78.99	76.45	81.65	5.20	−1.68
Massachusetts	80.55	77.98	82.95	4.97	0.08	80.63	78.10	83.05	4.95	−1.37	79.26	76.72	81.77	5.05	0.56	79.82	77.11	82.48	5.37	−0.81
Connecticut	80.97	78.61	83.17	4.56	−0.41	80.56	77.96	83.08	5.12	−1.88	78.68	75.93	81.46	5.53	0.70	79.38	76.52	82.26	5.74	−1.18
New Jersey	80.29	77.94	82.48	4.54	0.11	80.40	77.95	82.76	4.81	−2.47	77.93	75.09	80.81	5.72	1.32	79.25	76.59	81.90	5.31	−1.15
Colorado	80.18	78.01	82.32	4.31	0.07	80.25	78.05	82.50	4.45	−1.76	78.49	76.01	81.11	5.10	−0.57	77.92	75.18	80.87	5.69	−2.33
Washington (state)	80.18	78.03	82.32	4.29	0.02	80.20	78.10	82.33	4.23	−0.83	79.37	77.10	81.73	4.63	−1.03	78.34	75.89	80.93	5.04	−1.86
Vermont	80.06	77.86	82.16	4.30	−0.04	80.02	77.51	82.56	5.05	−0.73	79.29	76.88	81.72	4.84	−0.67	78.62	75.86	81.43	5.57	−1.40
Utah	79.65	77.97	81.33	3.36	0.27	79.92	78.19	81.69	3.50	−1.17	78.75	76.93	80.63	3.70	−0.53	78.22	76.32	80.21	3.89	−1.70
Rhode Island	79.95	77.60	82.08	4.48	−0.16	79.79	77.25	82.19	4.94	−1.14	78.65	75.99	81.32	5.33	0.15	78.80	76.21	81.38	5.17	−0.99
Idaho	79.35	77.38	81.34	3.96	0.34	79.69	77.77	81.68	3.91	−1.12	78.57	76.39	80.88	4.49	−1.39	77.18	74.81	79.74	4.93	−2.51
New Hampshire	79.87	77.67	82.04	4.37	−0.20	79.67	77.33	82.04	4.71	−0.40	79.27	76.80	81.85	5.05	−0.56	78.71	76.17	81.37	5.20	−0.96
Oregon	79.49	77.29	81.66	4.37	0.17	79.66	77.42	81.93	4.51	−0.81	78.85	76.45	81.34	4.89	−1.36	77.49	74.87	80.27	5.40	−2.17
Florida	79.39	76.78	81.97	5.19	0.15	79.54	76.80	82.29	5.49	−1.56	77.98	75.10	80.95	5.85	−1.31	76.67	73.64	79.85	6.21	−2.87
Nebraska	79.40	77.09	81.71	4.62	−0.02	79.38	77.33	81.44	4.11	−1.49	77.89	75.48	80.42	4.94	0.00	77.89	75.55	80.36	4.81	−1.49
Virginia	79.34	77.14	81.43	4.29	0.00	79.34	77.03	81.60	4.57	−1.51	77.83	75.37	80.31	4.94	−0.83	77.00	74.45	79.61	5.16	−2.34
Arizona	79.38	76.97	81.81	4.84	−0.07	79.31	76.64	82.09	5.45	−2.73	76.58	73.64	79.75	6.11	−1.13	75.45	72.42	78.76	6.34	−3.86
Wisconsin	79.57	77.40	81.72	4.32	−0.27	79.30	77.10	81.54	4.44	−1.54	77.76	75.35	80.31	4.96	−0.01	77.75	75.21	80.45	5.24	−1.55
Illinois	79.05	76.62	81.38	4.76	0.15	79.20	76.64	81.72	5.08	−2.17	77.03	74.17	79.98	5.81	0.31	77.34	74.46	80.31	5.85	−1.86
North Dakota	79.71	77.29	82.11	4.82	−0.54	79.17	76.56	81.89	5.33	−1.81	77.36	74.52	80.47	5.95	0.60	77.96	75.17	80.89	5.72	−1.21
Iowa	79.48	77.18	81.76	4.58	−0.33	79.15	76.60	81.77	5.17	−1.55	77.60	75.09	80.24	5.15	0.18	77.78	75.20	80.52	5.32	−1.37
Maryland	79.28	76.79	81.61	4.82	−0.33	78.95	76.14	81.66	5.52	−1.74	77.21	74.25	80.16	5.91	0.33	77.54	74.67	80.38	5.71	−1.41
Texas	78.46	76.06	80.82	4.76	0.36	78.82	76.37	81.29	4.92	−2.18	76.64	73.94	79.47	5.53	−0.99	75.65	72.91	78.54	5.63	−3.17
Montana	78.78	76.68	80.98	4.30	−0.15	78.63	76.37	81.05	4.68	−1.62	77.01	74.54	79.78	5.24	−1.02	75.99	73.24	79.07	5.83	−2.64
South Dakota	79.13	76.62	81.53	4.91	−0.59	78.54	76.05	81.03	4.98	−1.74	76.80	74.14	79.56	5.42	−0.11	76.69	74.08	79.38	5.30	−1.85
Maine	79.11	76.51	81.69	5.18	−0.59	78.52	75.97	81.10	5.13	−0.47	78.05	75.23	80.98	5.75	−1.17	76.88	73.89	80.06	6.17	−1.64
Pennsylvania	78.64	76.10	81.12	5.02	−0.14	78.50	75.88	81.12	5.24	−1.50	77.00	74.26	79.82	5.56	−0.47	76.53	73.67	79.49	5.82	−1.97
Delaware	78.79	76.36	81.00	4.64	−0.42	78.37	75.43	81.22	5.79	−1.42	76.95	74.22	79.68	5.46	−0.46	76.49	73.49	79.56	6.07	−1.88
Nevada	78.09	75.71	80.63	4.92	0.23	78.32	75.93	80.89	4.96	−1.86	76.46	73.84	79.34	5.50	−1.03	75.43	72.69	78.49	5.80	−2.89
Kansas	78.55	76.20	80.91	4.71	−0.27	78.28	76.02	80.58	4.56	−1.75	76.53	73.97	79.26	5.29	−0.47	76.06	73.51	78.77	5.26	−2.22
Washington, D.C.	78.09	75.44	80.41	4.97	0.19	78.28	75.02	81.13	6.11	−2.96	75.32	71.63	78.83	7.20	0.43	75.75	72.27	78.99	6.72	−2.53
Wyoming	78.27	76.02	80.60	4.58	−0.02	78.25	75.69	80.97	5.28	−1.67	76.58	74.17	79.19	5.02	−1.38	75.20	72.75	77.91	5.16	−3.05
Alaska	78.06	75.71	80.67	4.96	0.05	78.11	76.12	80.35	4.23	−1.14	76.97	74.66	79.63	4.97	−2.16	74.81	72.36	77.71	5.35	−3.30
Michigan	78.01	75.64	80.35	4.71	0.07	78.08	75.73	80.42	4.69	−1.91	76.17	73.61	78.83	5.22	−0.44	75.73	72.97	78.64	5.67	−2.35
North Carolina	77.94	75.41	80.37	4.96	−0.14	77.80	75.22	80.32	5.10	−1.58	76.22	73.42	79.05	5.63	−1.20	75.02	72.12	77.99	5.87	−2.78
Georgia	77.55	75.00	79.97	4.97	0.21	77.76	75.26	80.18	4.92	−1.93	75.83	73.14	78.51	5.37	−1.27	74.56	71.80	77.35	5.55	−3.20
New Mexico	77.61	74.84	80.46	5.62	−0.44	77.17	74.14	80.37	6.23	−2.40	74.77	71.70	78.08	6.38	−1.47	73.30	69.71	77.29	7.58	−3.87
Missouri	77.43	74.90	79.94	5.04	−0.30	77.13	74.31	79.99	5.68	−1.90	75.23	72.34	78.27	5.93	−0.47	74.76	71.73	77.95	6.22	−2.37
Indiana	77.35	74.88	79.78	4.90	−0.23	77.12	74.60	79.65	5.05	−1.95	75.17	72.47	77.99	5.52	−0.51	74.66	71.88	77.58	5.70	−2.46
Ohio	77.53	75.02	79.99	4.97	−0.52	77.01	74.47	79.56	5.09	−1.62	75.39	72.72	78.16	5.44	−0.82	74.57	71.75	77.54	5.79	−2.44
South Carolina	77.02	74.25	79.72	5.47	−0.09	76.93	74.01	79.83	5.82	−2.16	74.77	71.69	77.93	6.24	−1.19	73.58	70.52	76.74	6.22	−3.35
Louisiana	75.61	72.93	78.26	5.33	0.28	75.89	73.05	78.74	5.69	−2.70	73.19	70.08	76.46	6.38	−0.86	72.33	68.90	75.99	7.09	−3.56
Arkansas	75.83	73.26	78.40	5.14	0.04	75.87	73.20	78.61	5.41	−1.95	73.92	71.24	76.72	5.48	−1.25	72.67	69.83	75.70	5.87	−3.20
Oklahoma	75.62	73.28	78.00	4.72	0.24	75.86	73.33	78.47	5.14	−1.68	74.18	71.61	76.92	5.31	−1.42	72.76	70.06	75.68	5.62	−3.10
Tennessee	76.14	73.46	78.79	5.33	−0.37	75.77	72.94	78.64	5.70	−1.87	73.90	70.89	77.06	6.17	−1.46	72.44	69.48	75.57	6.09	−3.33
Kentucky	75.74	73.11	78.39	5.28	−0.12	75.62	73.11	78.19	5.08	−1.93	73.69	70.89	76.66	5.77	−1.25	72.44	69.67	75.40	5.73	−3.18
Alabama	75.44	72.74	78.08	5.34	0.04	75.48	72.51	78.46	5.95	−1.96	73.52	70.45	76.69	6.24	−1.34	72.18	69.02	75.48	6.46	−3.30
West Virginia	75.21	72.55	77.96	5.41	−0.53	74.68	72.11	77.41	5.30	−1.69	72.99	70.06	76.22	6.16	−1.88	71.11	68.27	74.27	6.00	−3.57
Mississippi	74.81	71.84	77.78	5.94	−0.27	74.54	71.37	77.75	6.38	−2.61	71.93	68.68	75.32	6.64	−0.96	70.97	67.71	74.39	6.68	−3.57

Data source: US Mortality DataBase, 2025.

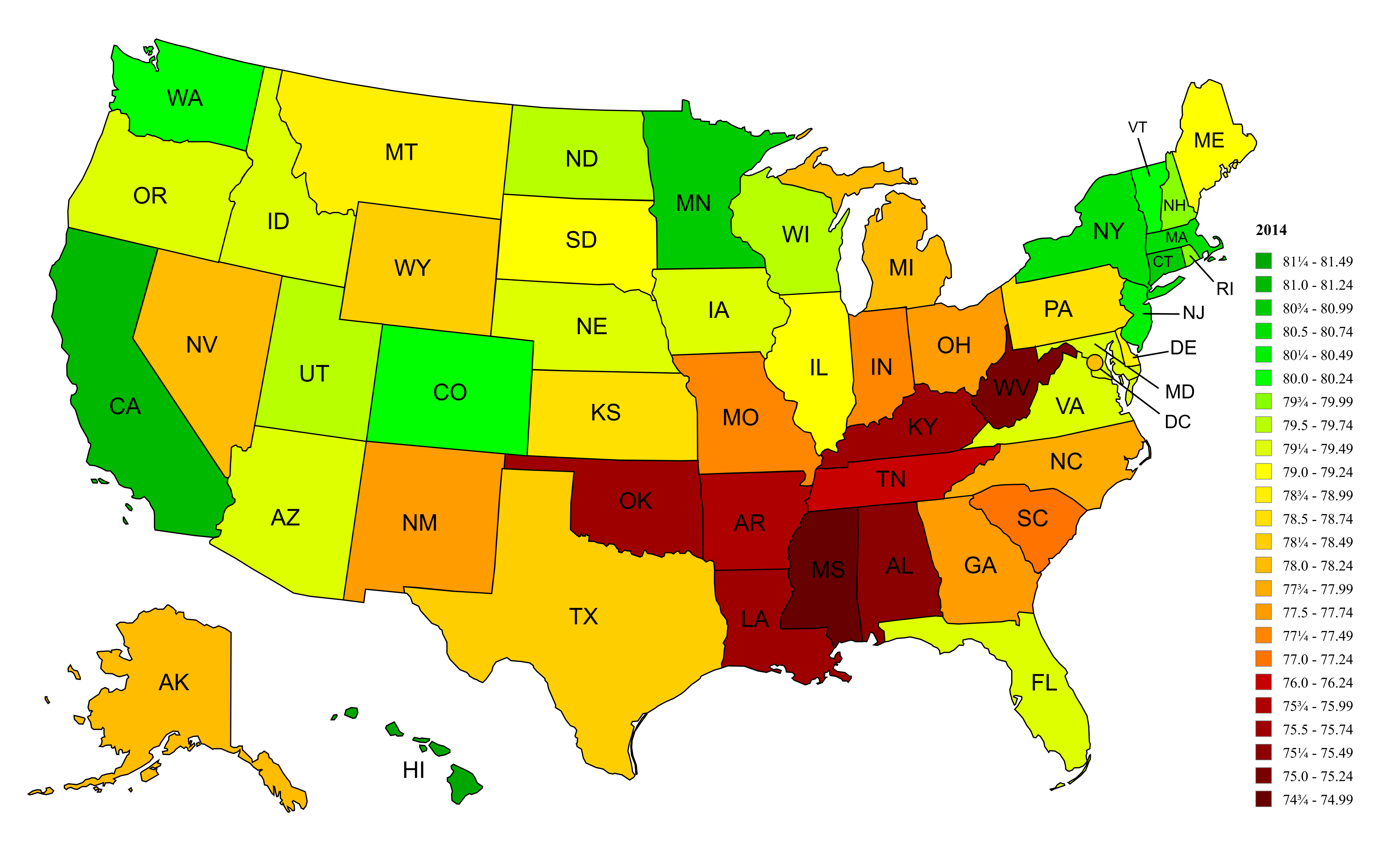
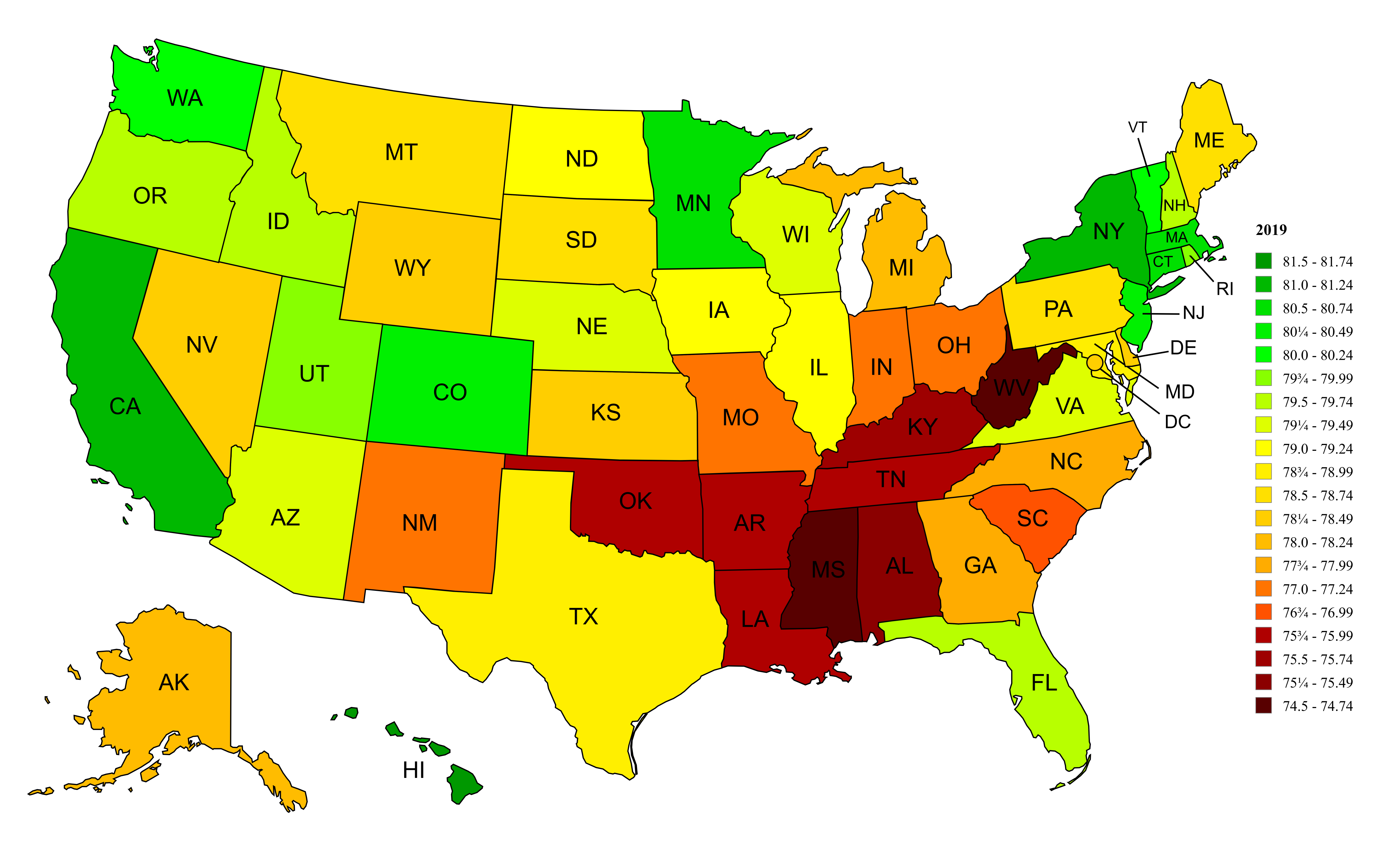
U.S. life expectancy by state in 2014 and 2019, according to the US Mortality DataBase.
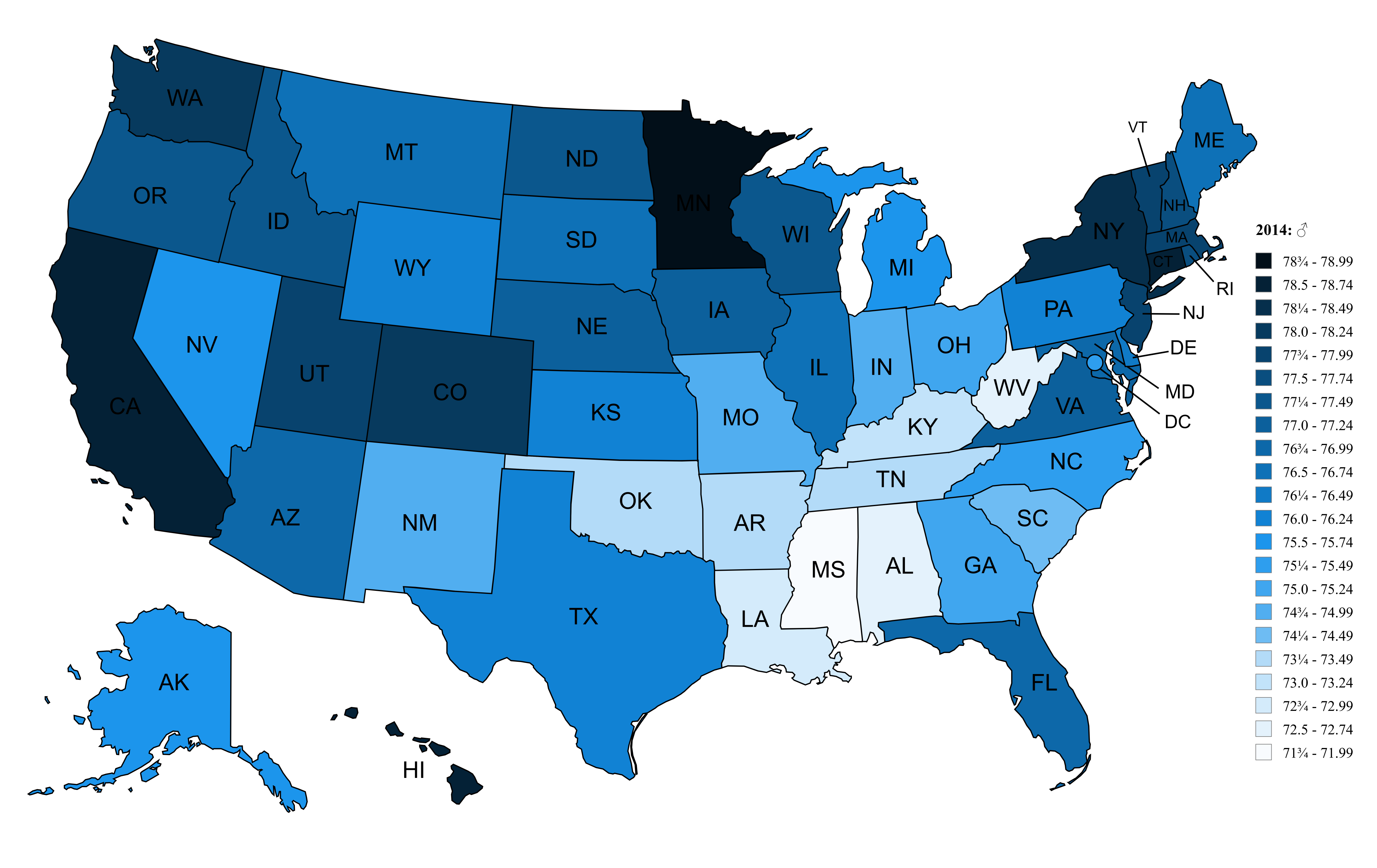
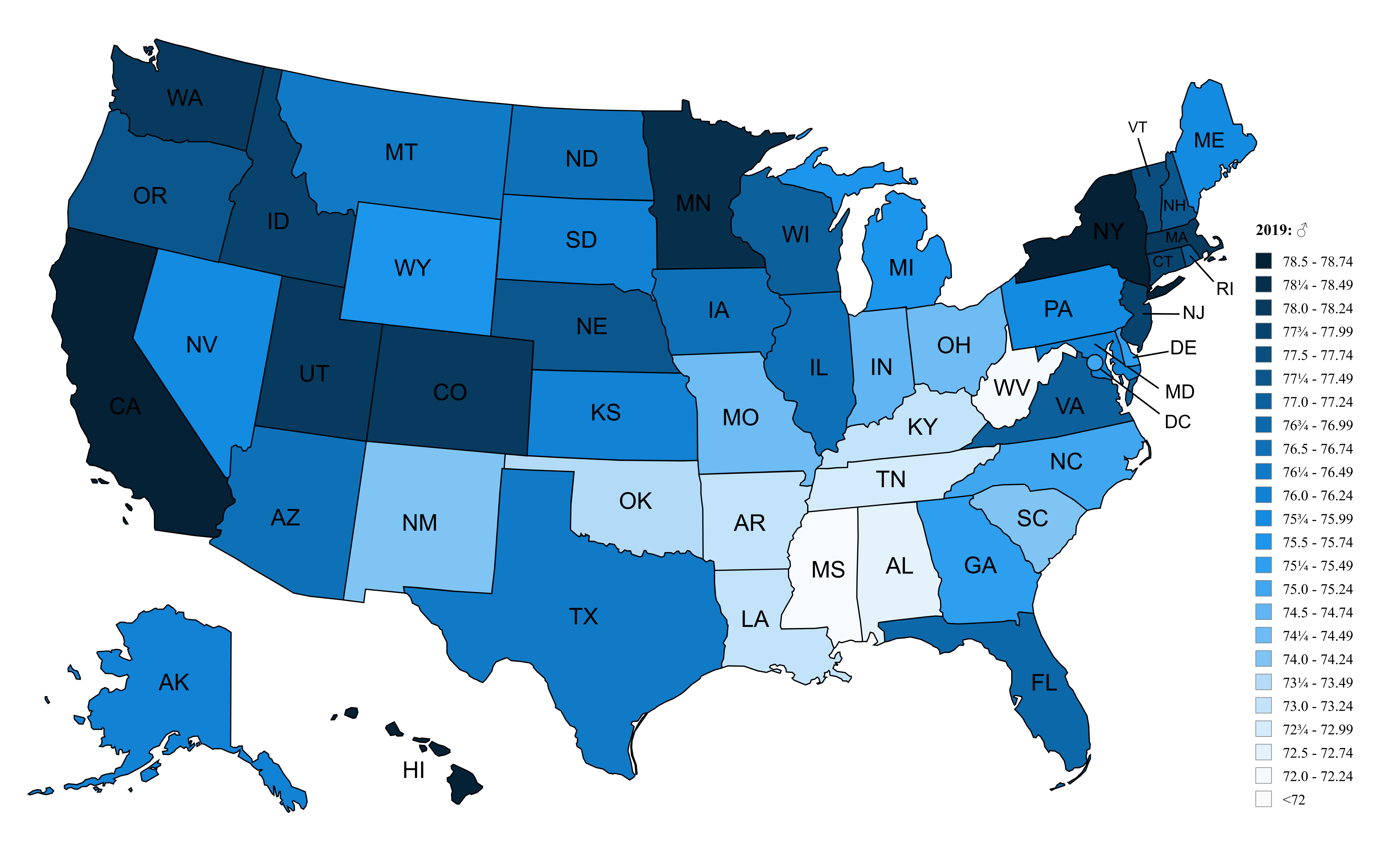
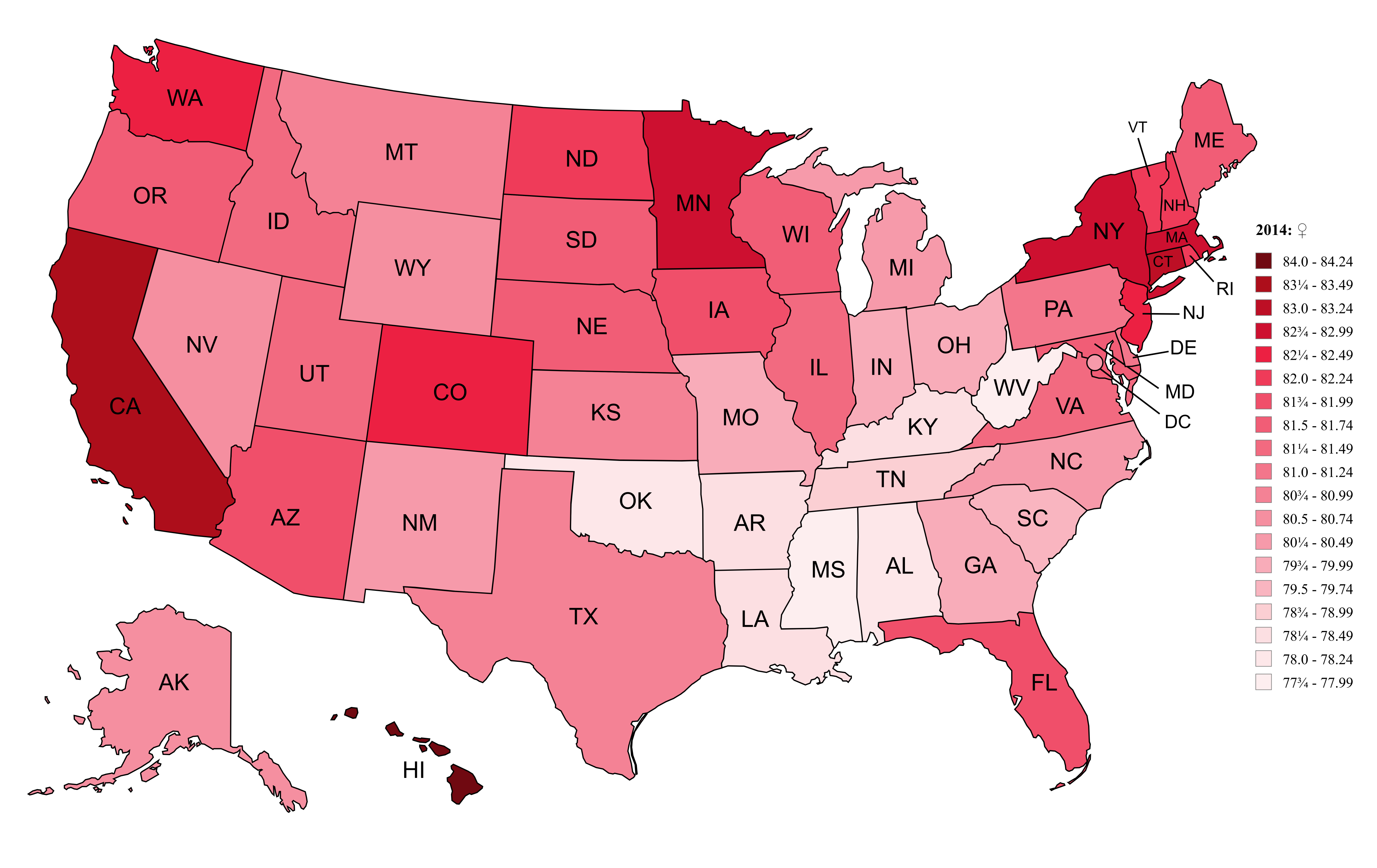
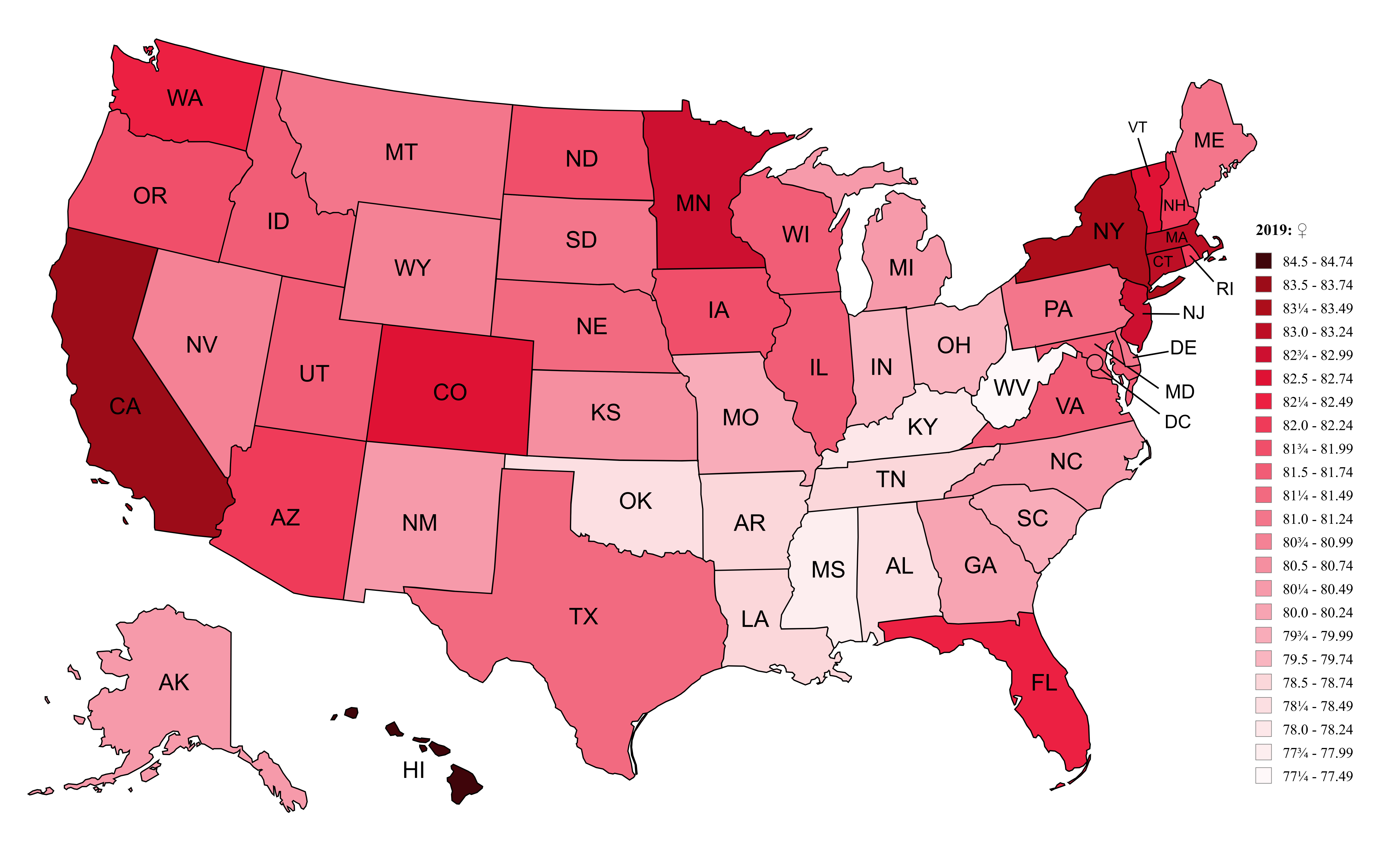
Life expectancy maps in 2014 and 2019 for male and female.

== Global Data Lab (2019–2021) ==
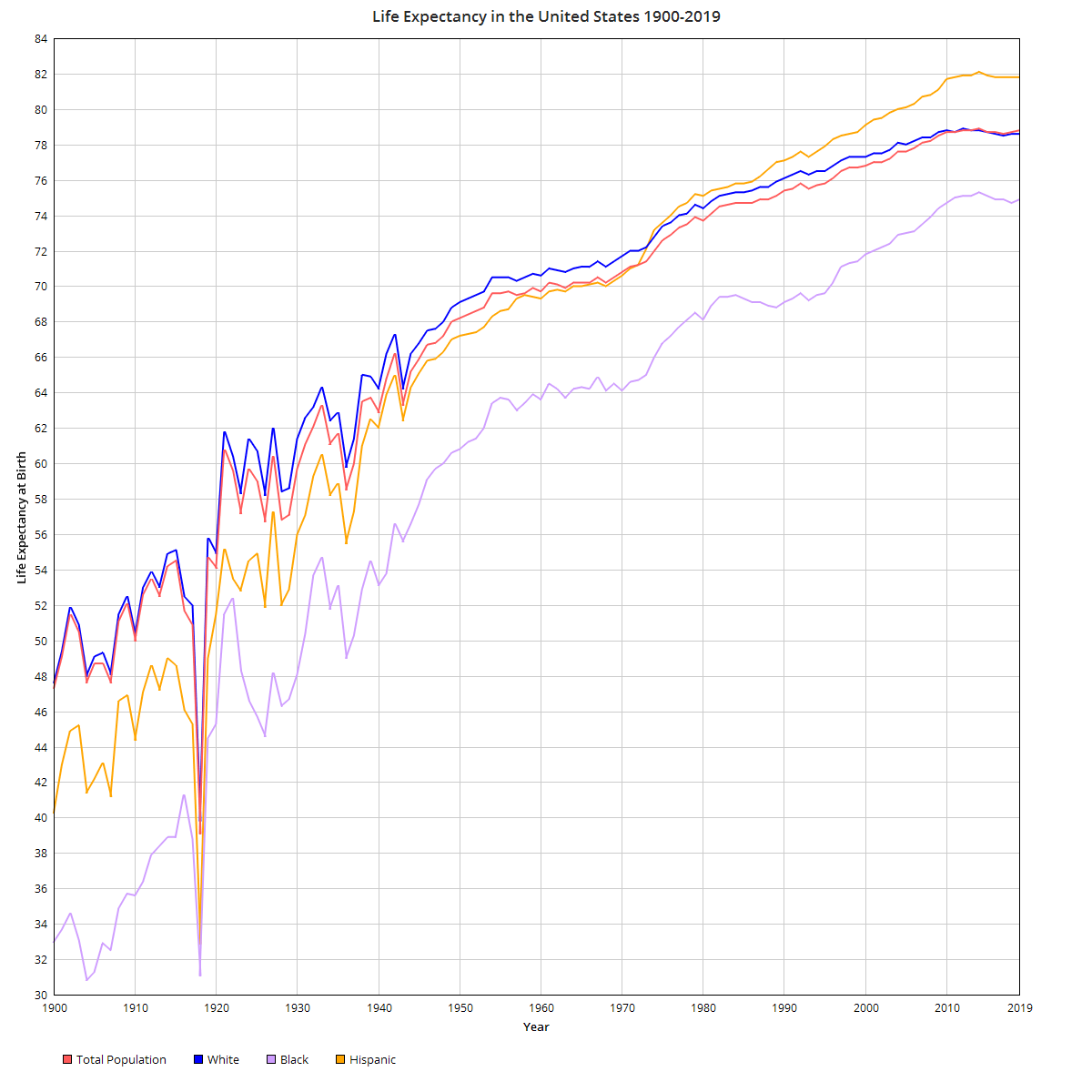
U.S. life expectancy by race, 1900–2019.

U.S. life expectancy by sex, 1900–2024.

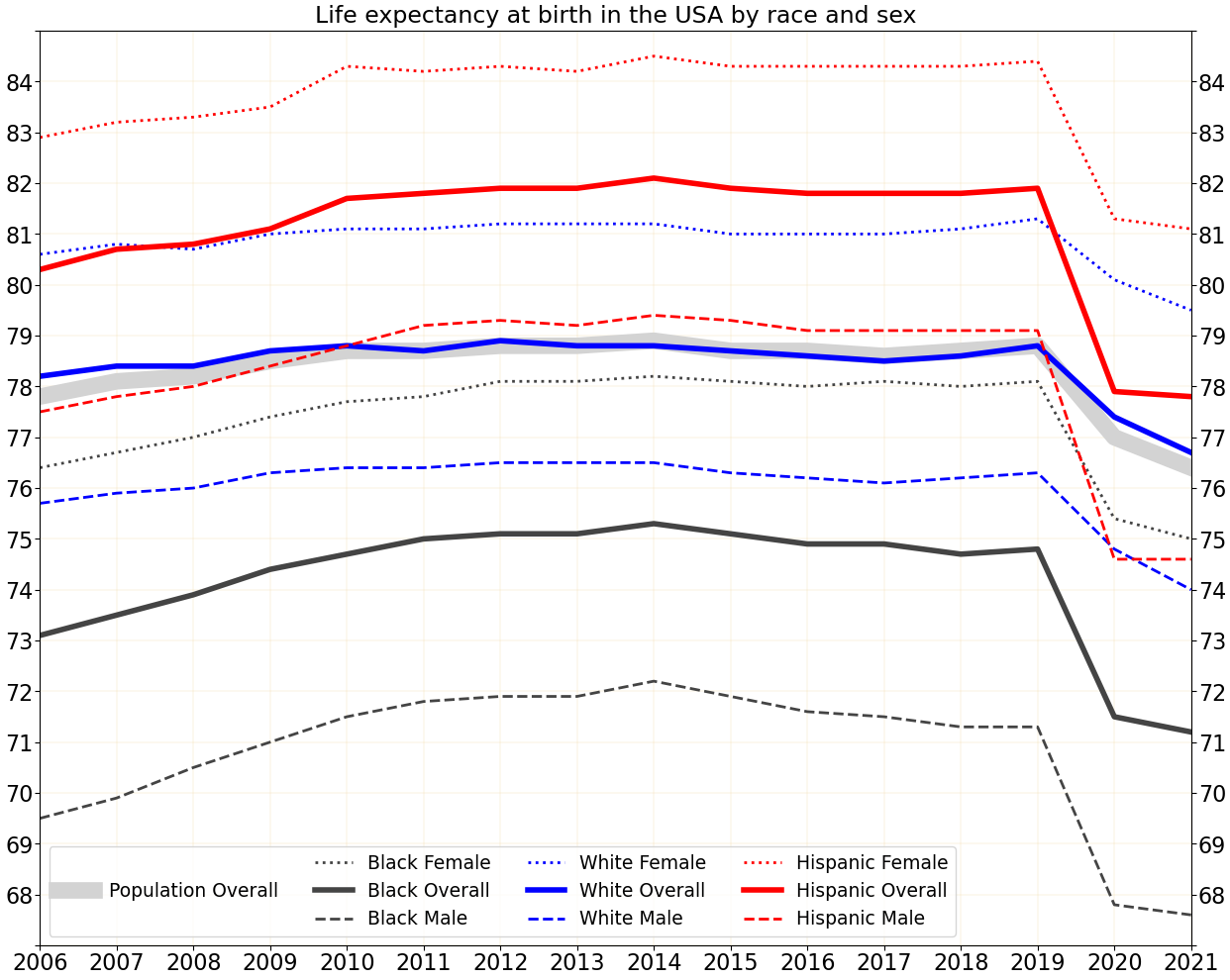
U.S. life expectancy by race and sex, 2006–2024.

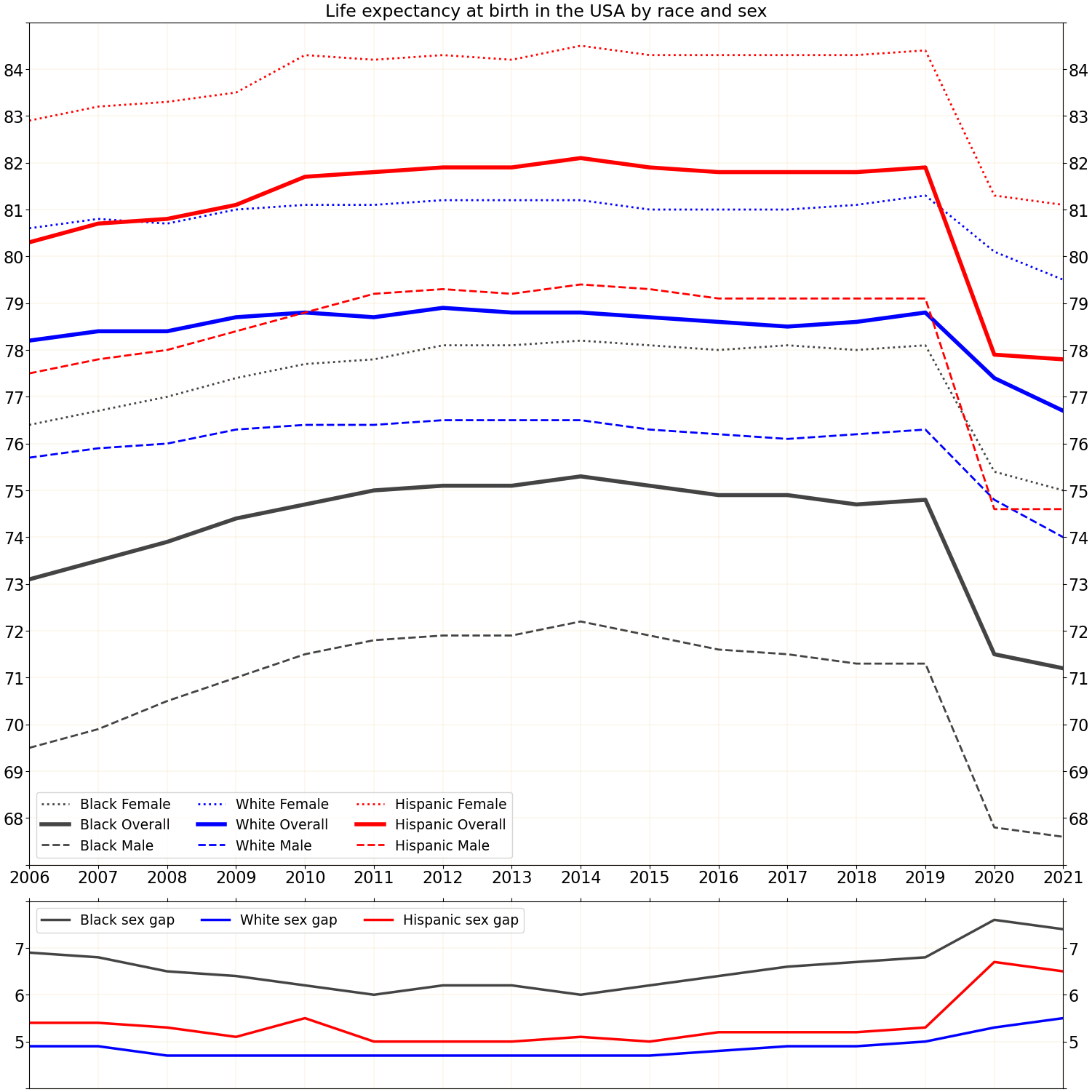
U.S. life expectancy by race and sex, with sex gap, 2006–2024.

region	2019				2019 →2020	2020	2020 →2021	2021				2019 →2021
region	overall	male	female	F Δ M	2019 →2020	overall	2020 →2021	overall	male	female	F Δ M	2019 →2021
USA on average	79.14	76.60	81.72	5.12	−1.73	77.41	−0.21	77.20	74.30	80.24	5.94	−1.94
Hawaii	81.55	78.49	84.65	6.16	−1.78	79.77	−0.22	79.55	76.14	83.11	6.97	−2.00
Minnesota	81.35	78.99	83.74	4.75	−1.78	79.57	−0.22	79.35	76.62	82.22	5.60	−2.00
California	81.04	78.70	83.43	4.73	−1.76	79.28	−0.22	79.06	76.34	81.92	5.58	−1.98
Connecticut	81.04	78.70	83.43	4.73	−1.76	79.28	−0.22	79.06	76.34	81.92	5.58	−1.98
Vermont	80.74	78.39	83.14	4.75	−1.76	78.98	−0.22	78.76	76.03	81.64	5.61	−1.98
Massachusetts	80.74	78.25	83.28	5.03	−1.76	78.98	−0.22	78.76	75.90	81.77	5.87	−1.98
New York	80.74	78.25	83.28	5.03	−1.76	78.98	−0.22	78.76	75.90	81.77	5.87	−1.98
New Hampshire	80.54	78.35	82.77	4.42	−1.75	78.79	−0.22	78.57	76.00	81.27	5.27	−1.97
New Jersey	80.54	78.10	83.03	4.93	−1.75	78.79	−0.22	78.57	75.75	81.52	5.77	−1.97
Utah	80.44	78.35	82.57	4.22	−1.75	78.69	−0.22	78.47	76.00	81.08	5.08	−1.97
Colorado	80.24	78.00	82.52	4.52	−1.75	78.49	−0.22	78.27	75.66	81.02	5.36	−1.97
Wisconsin	80.24	77.74	82.78	5.04	−1.75	78.49	−0.22	78.27	75.41	81.28	5.87	−1.97
Washington (state)	80.14	77.96	82.37	4.41	−1.74	78.40	−0.22	78.18	75.62	80.87	5.25	−1.96
Rhode Island	80.14	77.59	82.74	5.15	−1.74	78.40	−0.22	78.18	75.26	81.24	5.98	−1.96
Nebraska	80.04	77.59	82.53	4.94	−1.74	78.30	−0.22	78.08	75.27	81.03	5.76	−1.96
Iowa	79.94	77.49	82.43	4.94	−1.74	78.20	−0.22	77.98	75.17	80.94	5.77	−1.96
Arizona	79.84	77.20	82.52	5.32	−1.74	78.10	−0.22	77.88	74.89	81.03	6.14	−1.96
Idaho	79.74	77.60	81.92	4.32	−1.74	78.00	−0.21	77.79	75.27	80.44	5.17	−1.95
Oregon	79.74	77.45	82.07	4.62	−1.74	78.00	−0.21	77.79	75.13	80.58	5.45	−1.95
South Dakota	79.74	77.04	82.48	5.44	−1.74	78.00	−0.21	77.79	74.73	80.98	6.25	−1.95
North Dakota	79.74	76.91	82.62	5.71	−1.74	78.00	−0.21	77.79	74.60	81.12	6.52	−1.95
Florida	79.64	76.80	82.53	5.73	−1.73	77.91	−0.22	77.69	74.49	81.03	6.54	−1.95
Maine	79.44	77.05	81.87	4.82	−1.73	77.71	−0.22	77.49	74.74	80.39	5.65	−1.95
Virginia	79.24	76.85	81.67	4.82	−1.73	77.51	−0.21	77.30	74.54	80.19	5.65	−1.94
Illinois	79.24	76.70	81.82	5.12	−1.73	77.51	−0.21	77.30	74.40	80.33	5.93	−1.94
Maryland	79.04	76.50	81.62	5.12	−1.72	77.32	−0.22	77.10	74.21	80.14	5.93	−1.94
Kansas	78.94	76.40	81.52	5.12	−1.72	77.22	−0.22	77.00	74.10	80.04	5.94	−1.94
Montana	78.74	76.41	81.11	4.70	−1.72	77.02	−0.21	76.81	74.12	79.64	5.52	−1.93
Texas	78.74	76.25	81.27	5.02	−1.72	77.02	−0.21	76.81	73.96	79.79	5.83	−1.93
Pennsylvania	78.74	76.05	81.46	5.41	−1.72	77.02	−0.21	76.81	73.77	79.99	6.22	−1.93
Delaware	78.64	76.05	81.27	5.22	−1.72	76.92	−0.21	76.71	73.77	79.79	6.02	−1.93
New Mexico	78.64	75.74	81.57	5.83	−1.72	76.92	−0.21	76.71	73.47	80.09	6.62	−1.93
Alaska	78.54	76.20	80.91	4.71	−1.71	76.83	−0.22	76.61	73.92	79.44	5.52	−1.93
Wyoming	78.54	76.15	80.96	4.81	−1.71	76.83	−0.22	76.61	73.87	79.49	5.62	−1.93
Michigan	78.44	75.95	80.96	5.01	−1.71	76.73	−0.22	76.51	73.67	79.50	5.83	−1.93
Nevada	78.34	75.86	80.86	5.00	−1.71	76.63	−0.21	76.42	73.58	79.39	5.81	−1.92
Ohio	78.04	75.50	80.61	5.11	−1.70	76.34	−0.22	76.12	73.23	79.15	5.92	−1.92
North Carolina	78.04	75.35	80.77	5.42	−1.70	76.34	−0.22	76.12	73.08	79.30	6.22	−1.92
Indiana	77.83	75.20	80.51	5.31	−1.69	76.14	−0.21	75.93	72.94	79.05	6.11	−1.90
Missouri	77.73	75.05	80.46	5.41	−1.69	76.04	−0.21	75.83	72.80	79.00	6.20	−1.90
Georgia	77.43	74.85	80.06	5.21	−1.68	75.75	−0.21	75.54	72.60	78.61	6.01	−1.89
South Carolina	77.23	74.29	80.22	5.93	−1.68	75.55	−0.21	75.34	72.06	78.76	6.70	−1.89
Washington, D.C.	76.73	73.86	79.65	5.79	−1.67	75.06	−0.21	74.85	71.64	78.20	6.56	−1.88
Tennessee	76.53	73.70	79.40	5.70	−1.67	74.86	−0.21	74.65	71.49	77.96	6.47	−1.88
Kentucky	76.23	73.55	78.95	5.40	−1.66	74.57	−0.21	74.36	71.34	77.52	6.18	−1.87
Arkansas	76.23	73.30	79.20	5.90	−1.66	74.57	−0.21	74.36	71.10	77.77	6.67	−1.87
Oklahoma	76.13	73.55	78.75	5.20	−1.66	74.47	−0.21	74.26	71.34	77.32	5.98	−1.87
Louisiana	75.93	72.90	79.00	6.10	−1.65	74.28	−0.21	74.07	70.71	77.57	6.86	−1.86
Alabama	75.63	72.75	78.55	5.80	−1.65	73.98	−0.21	73.77	70.57	77.13	6.56	−1.86
West Virginia	75.63	72.71	78.59	5.88	−1.65	73.98	−0.21	73.77	70.53	77.17	6.64	−1.86
Mississippi	75.23	72.09	78.41	6.32	−1.64	73.59	−0.21	73.38	69.92	76.99	7.07	−1.85

Data source: Global Data Lab, 2021.

== Probability of dying, 2015–2019 ==
The below tables measure the proportion of people who die at a given age.

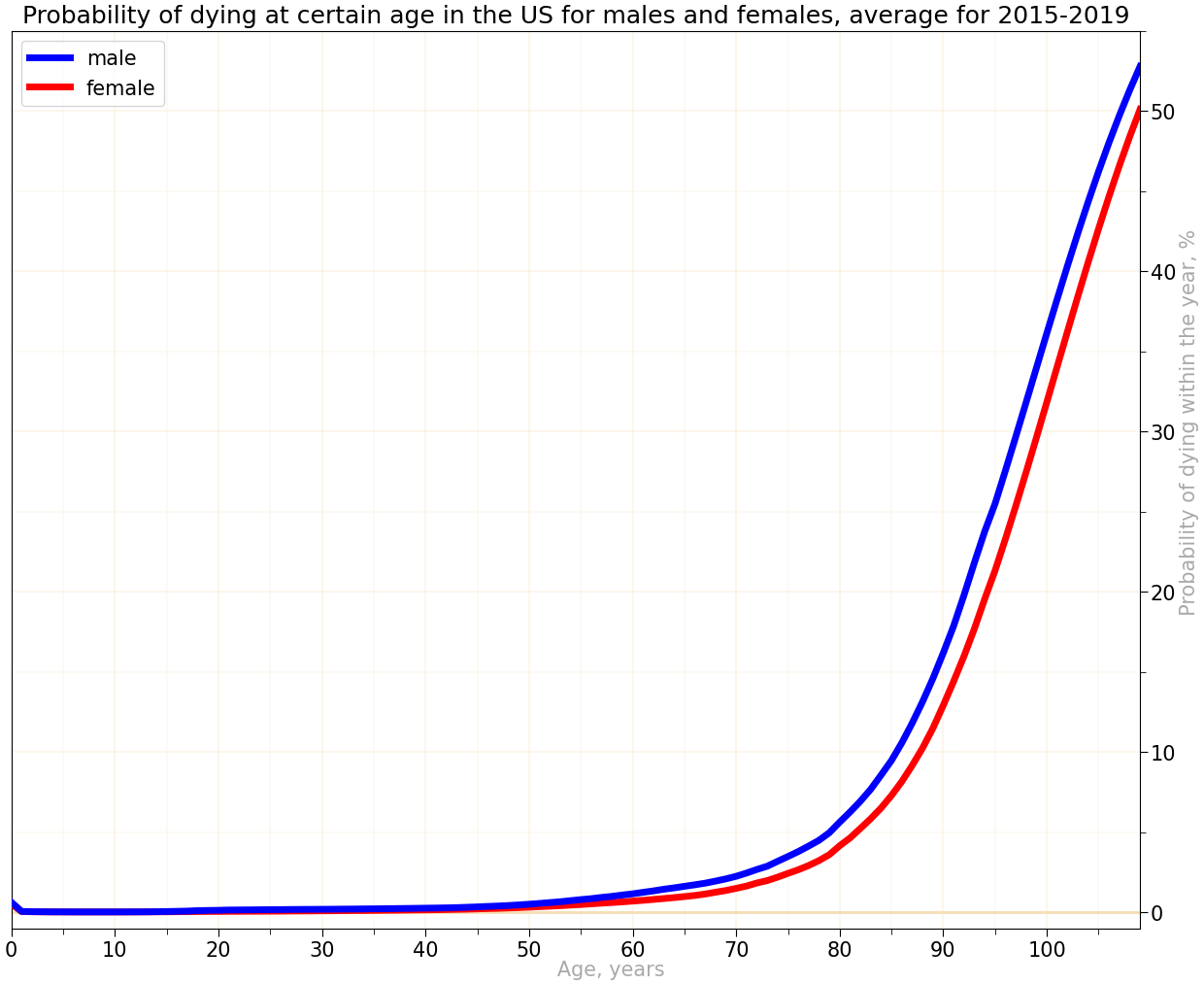
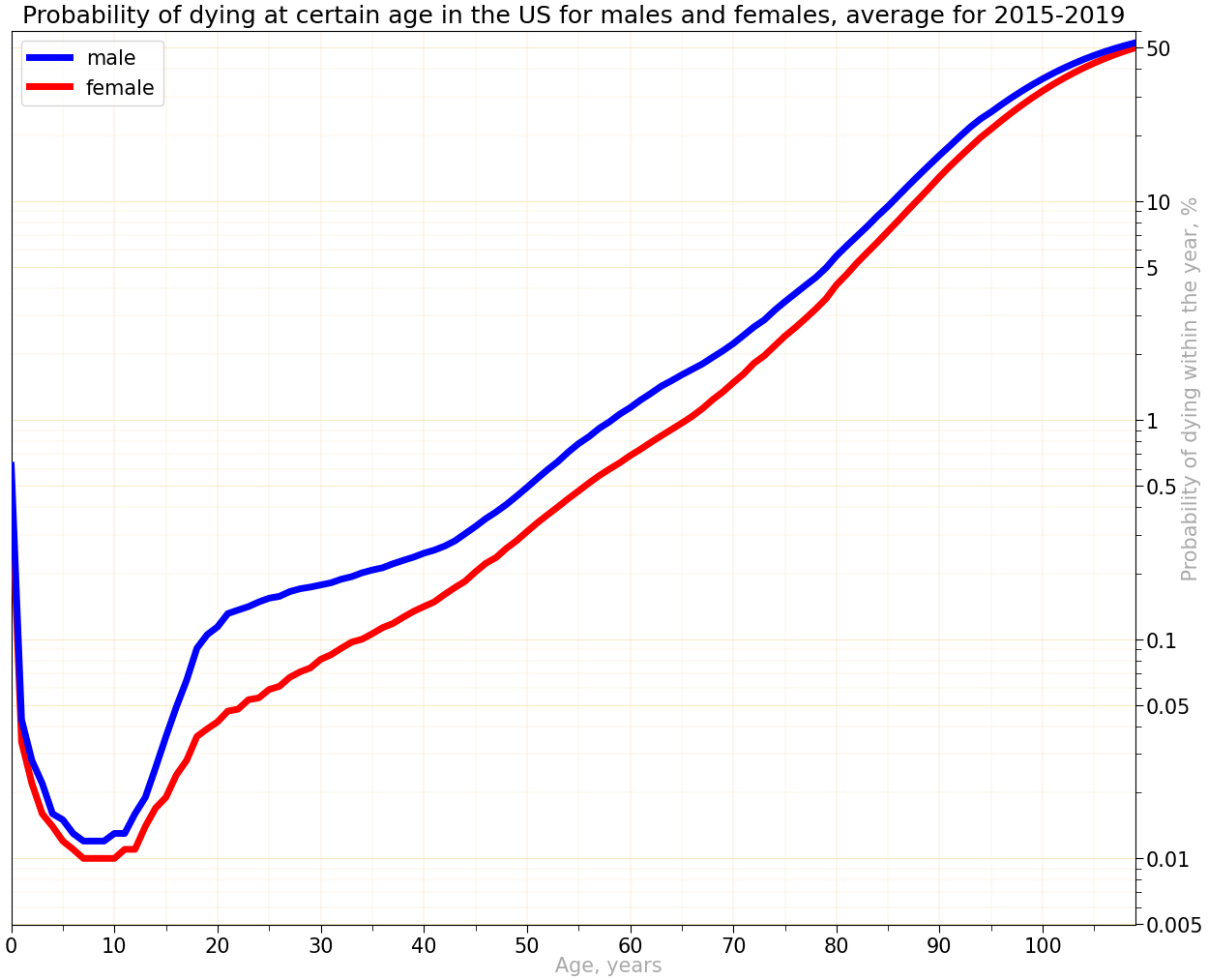
The probability of dying in the US for males and females at each year. The chart is made in two versions: linear and logarithmic scales.
By the age of 109, the probability of dying reaches 53% for male and 50% for female. The probability of dying between ages 40 and 90 doubles every 8.4 years for male and 7.9 years for female.

Age	US on average			New York			California			Hawaii		
Age	Probability of dying, %		M / F	Probability of dying, %		M / F	Probability of dying, %		M / F	Probability of dying, %		M / F
Age	male	female	M / F	male	female	M / F	male	female	M / F	male	female	M / F
0	0.622	0.517	1.20	0.475	0.399	1.19	0.452	0.377	1.20	0.648	0.501	1.29
1	0.043	0.034	1.26	0.027	0.025	1.08	0.033	0.023	1.43	0.055	0.032	1.72
5	0.015	0.012	1.25	0.012	0.010	1.20	0.010	0.008	1.25	0.013	0.016	0.81
10	0.013	0.010	1.30	0.012	0.010	1.20	0.009	0.008	1.12	0.007	0.010	0.70
15	0.036	0.019	1.89	0.024	0.013	1.85	0.027	0.016	1.69	0.027	0.013	2.08
20	0.114	0.042	2.71	0.078	0.035	2.23	0.099	0.033	3.00	0.077	0.053	1.45
25	0.154	0.059	2.61	0.115	0.039	2.95	0.115	0.039	2.95	0.090	0.041	2.20
30	0.177	0.081	2.19	0.134	0.058	2.31	0.122	0.051	2.39	0.131	0.060	2.18
35	0.207	0.106	1.95	0.159	0.077	2.06	0.150	0.069	2.17	0.158	0.075	2.11
40	0.247	0.141	1.75	0.194	0.106	1.83	0.182	0.109	1.67	0.191	0.112	1.71
45	0.327	0.203	1.61	0.266	0.158	1.68	0.253	0.157	1.61	0.288	0.151	1.91
50	0.493	0.310	1.59	0.412	0.254	1.62	0.391	0.238	1.64	0.441	0.269	1.64
55	0.781	0.475	1.64	0.654	0.365	1.79	0.635	0.372	1.71	0.712	0.350	2.03
60	1.140	0.689	1.65	0.923	0.554	1.67	0.939	0.553	1.70	1.059	0.555	1.91
65	1.609	0.969	1.66	1.394	0.822	1.70	1.362	0.809	1.68	1.328	0.698	1.90
70	2.235	1.483	1.51	1.976	1.299	1.52	1.913	1.208	1.58	1.837	1.130	1.63
75	3.470	2.417	1.44	3.033	2.113	1.44	2.977	2.013	1.48	2.715	1.690	1.61
80	5.617	4.143	1.36	5.122	3.602	1.42	4.932	3.605	1.37	3.909	2.467	1.58
85	9.466	7.279	1.30	8.735	6.410	1.36	8.581	6.528	1.31	7.377	4.961	1.49
90	16.170	12.904	1.25	15.106	11.773	1.28	14.878	11.936	1.25	13.270	9.601	1.38
95	25.482	21.312	1.20	24.334	19.642	1.24	23.725	19.797	1.20	22.114	17.360	1.27
100	36.122	31.822	1.14	35.142	30.000	1.17	34.353	30.164	1.14	33.190	28.282	1.17
105	46.218	42.642	1.08	45.582	41.052	1.11	44.776	41.188	1.09	44.297	40.439	1.10
109	52.763	50.085	1.05	52.398	48.863	1.07	51.695	48.962	1.06	51.665	49.046	1.05

Data source: Harvard Dataverse: The United States Fertility and Mortality Database

== Percentage surviving ==
The percentage surviving is the percent of the population that would survive to a certain age, if their life conditions in a given year were extrapolated to their whole life.

=== Data of the National Center for Health Statistics, 2024 ===
Hispanic origin and race	Percentage surviving to 65 years		percentage surviving to 85 years		percentage surviving to 100 years	
Hispanic origin and race	male	female	male	female	male	female
total population	80.4	88.0	37.0	50.5	1.2	3.0
non-Hispanic Asian	90.8	95.1	57.8	70.6	4.3	8.3
Hispanic	83.8	91.1	45.9	60.0	3.0	5.5
non-Hispanic White	80.6	87.7	36.6	49.6	1.0	2.5
non-Hispanic Black	70.7	82.1	26.3	42.4	1.2	3.7
non-Hispanic American Indian or Alaska Native	58.7	72.5	25.0	37.0	4.1	5.6

Data source: National Center for Health Statistics, 2026.

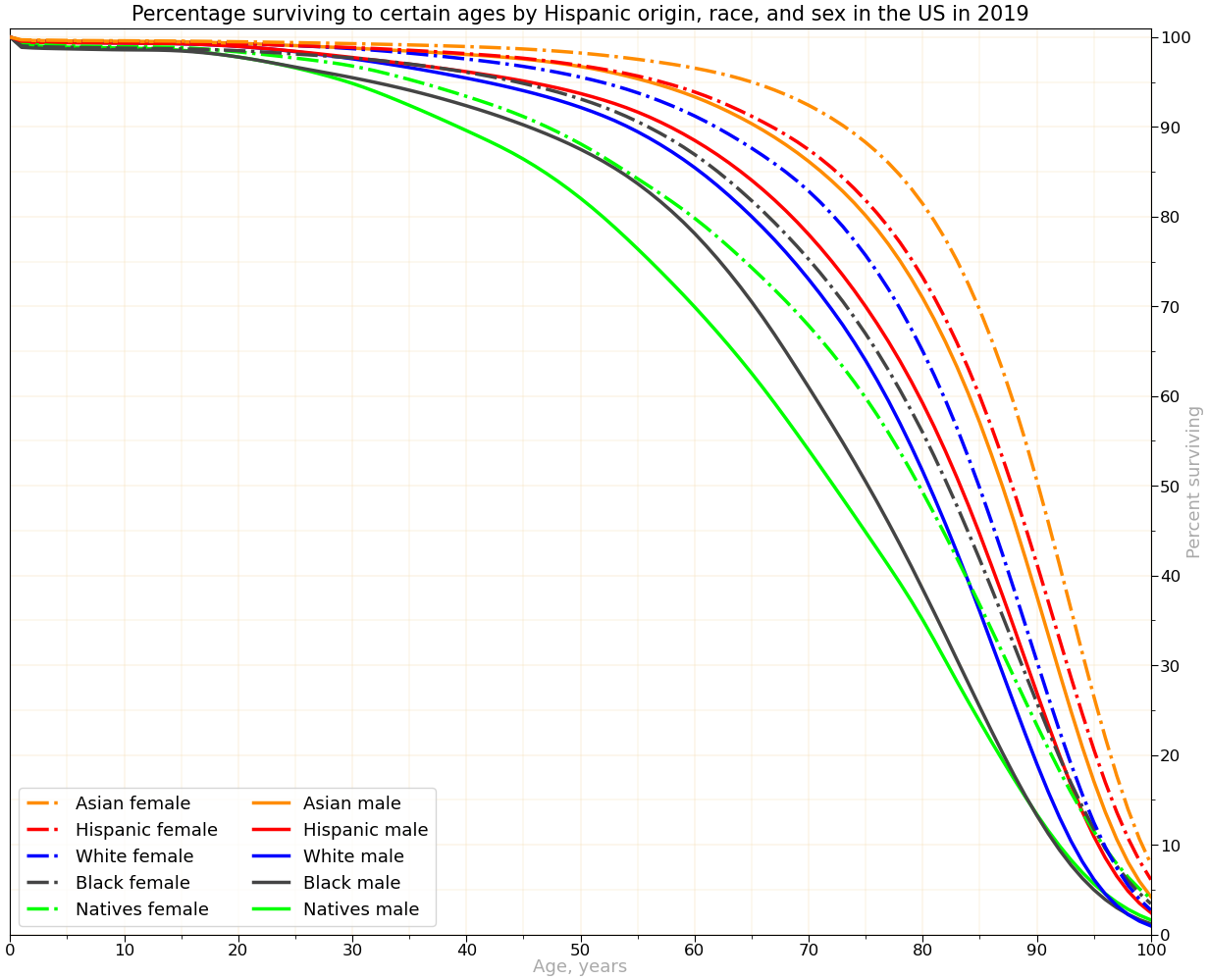
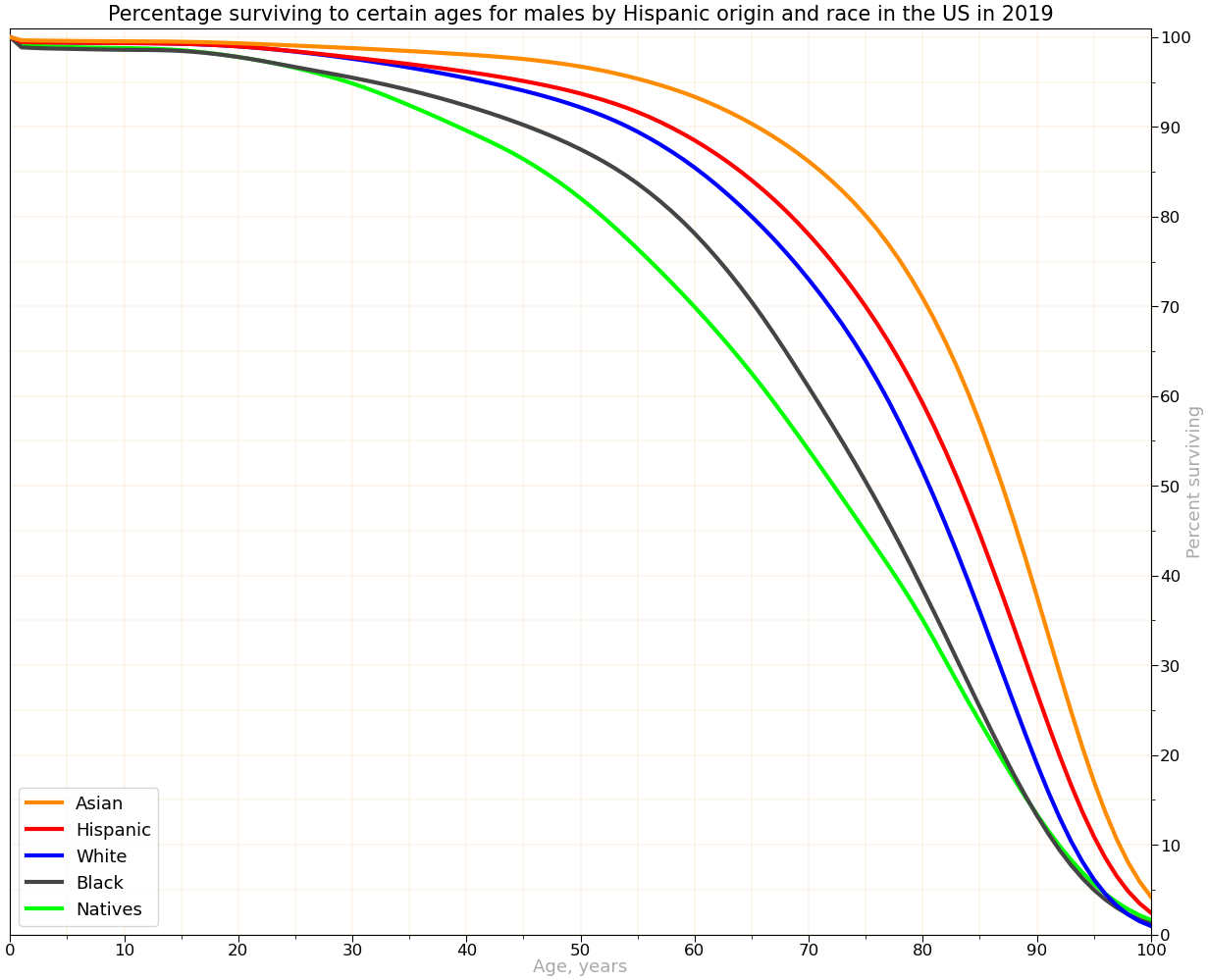
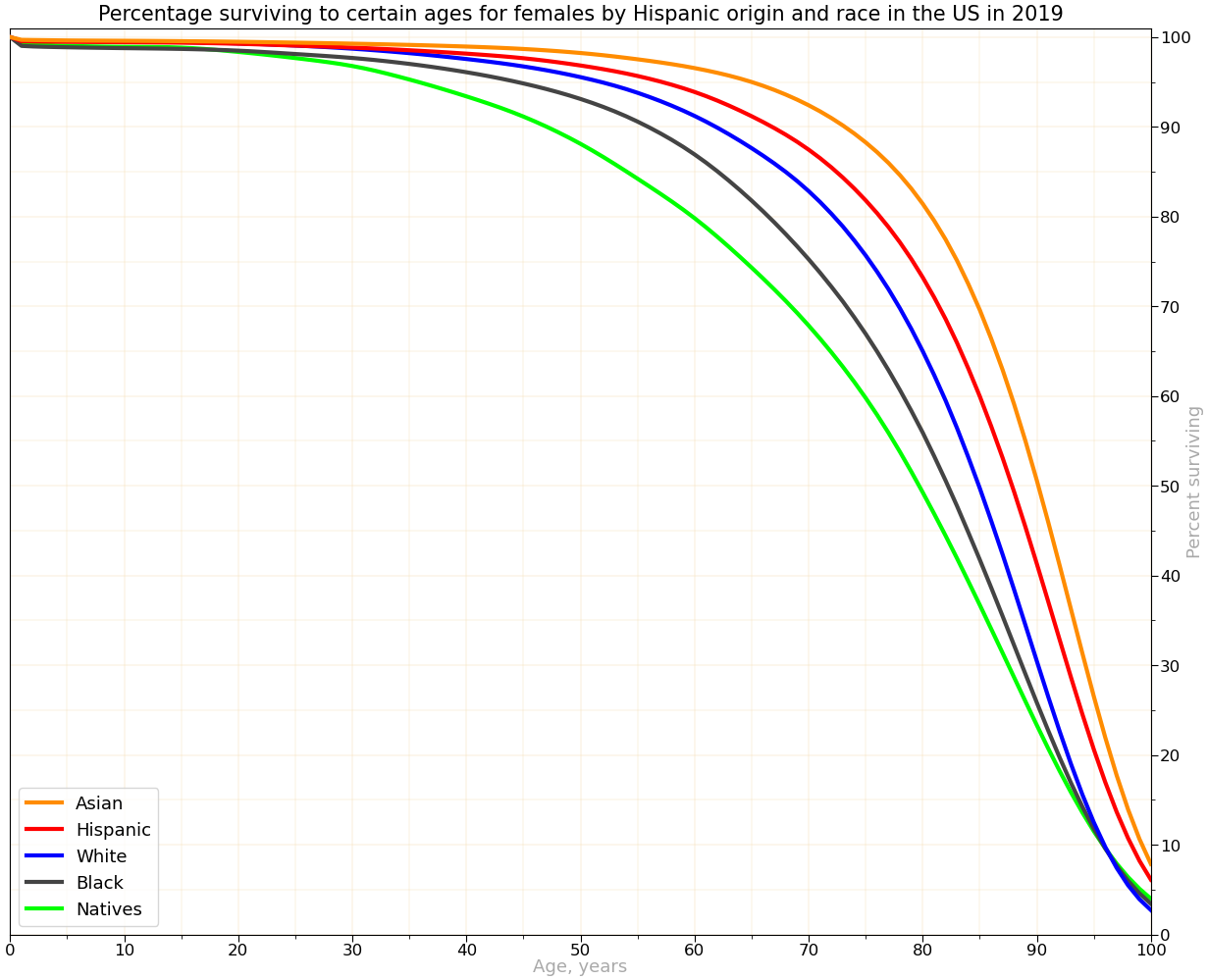
The percent of people surviving to certain ages by race and sex in the US, 2024.

=== Data of the United States Mortality DataBase, 2019 ===
The table below contains data about percentage surviving in the US on average in comparison to the data for the states of New York and California.

Males living in California are slightly more likely to live to 100 years than males living in New York; the inverse is true for females.

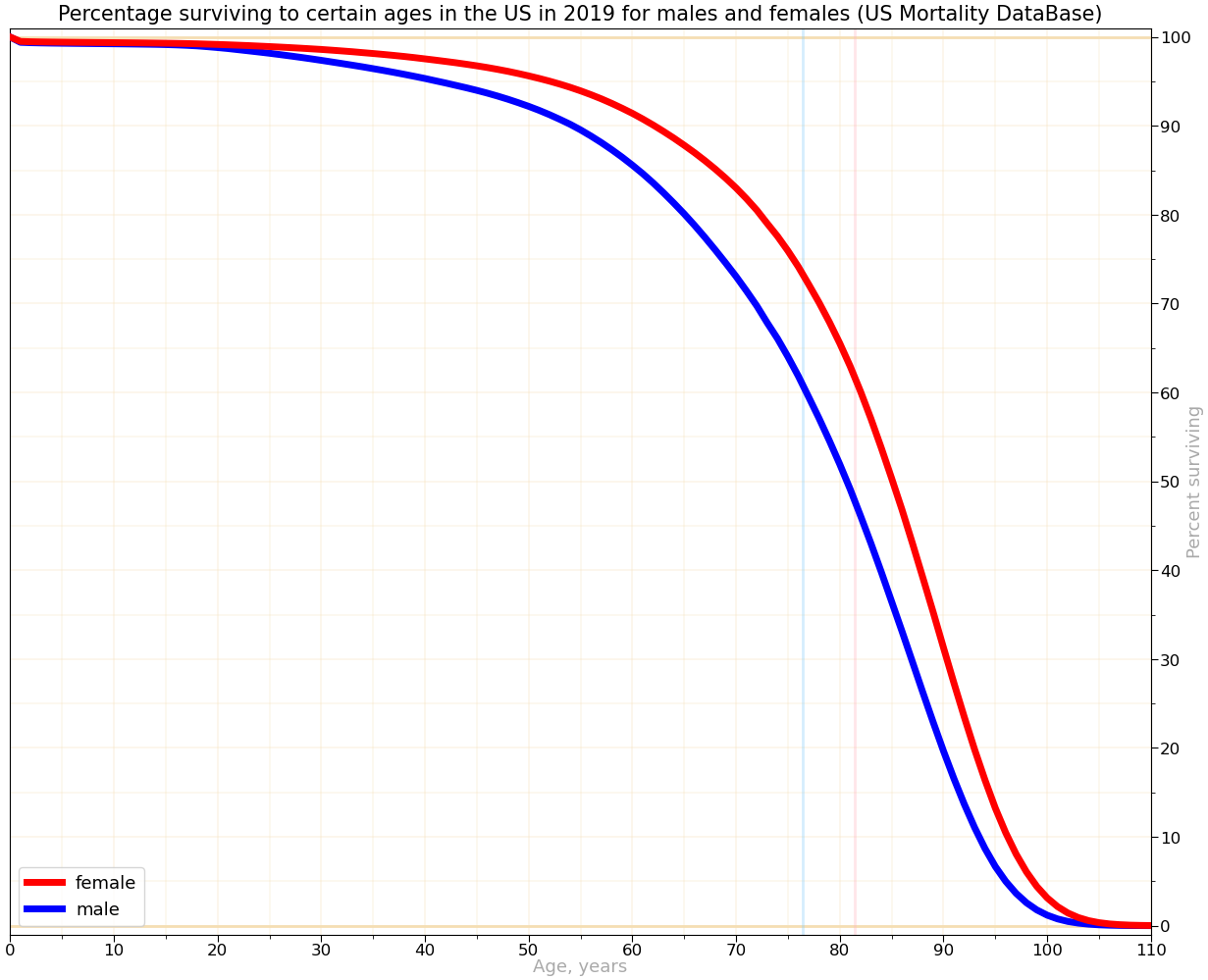
The percent of US people surviving to certain ages by gender, 2019, US Mortality DataBase.

Age	US on average			New York			California			Hawaii		
Age	Percentage surviving		F / M	Percentage surviving		F / M	Percentage surviving		F / M	Percentage surviving		F / M
Age	male	female	F / M	male	female	F / M	male	female	F / M	male	female	F / M
1	99.4	99.5	1.00	99.5	99.6	1.00	99.6	99.6	1.00	99.5	99.5	1.00
5	99.3	99.4	1.00	99.4	99.6	1.00	99.5	99.6	1.00	99.3	99.5	1.00
10	99.2	99.4	1.00	99.4	99.5	1.00	99.4	99.5	1.00	99.3	99.4	1.00
15	99.1	99.3	1.00	99.3	99.5	1.00	99.4	99.5	1.00	99.1	99.3	1.00
20	98.8	99.2	1.00	99.1	99.4	1.00	99.1	99.4	1.00	98.8	99.2	1.00
25	98.2	98.9	1.01	98.7	99.2	1.01	98.6	99.2	1.01	98.5	99.0	1.00
30	97.4	98.6	1.01	98.1	99.0	1.01	98.0	99.0	1.01	98.0	98.8	1.01
35	96.4	98.1	1.02	97.4	98.6	1.01	97.3	98.7	1.01	97.2	98.5	1.01
40	95.3	97.5	1.02	96.5	98.2	1.02	96.4	98.2	1.02	96.1	98.1	1.02
45	94.0	96.8	1.03	95.4	97.7	1.02	95.4	97.7	1.02	94.9	97.4	1.03
50	92.2	95.6	1.04	93.9	96.8	1.03	94.0	96.8	1.03	93.1	96.4	1.04
55	89.6	93.9	1.05	91.7	95.4	1.04	91.8	95.5	1.04	90.6	94.8	1.05
60	85.6	91.4	1.07	88.4	93.4	1.06	88.5	93.6	1.06	87.1	92.7	1.07
65	80.1	87.8	1.10	83.7	90.4	1.08	83.8	90.6	1.08	82.0	89.9	1.10
70	73.1	83.0	1.14	77.3	86.2	1.11	77.6	86.6	1.12	76.2	86.2	1.13
75	64.0	75.9	1.19	68.9	79.9	1.16	69.4	80.6	1.16	68.4	81.1	1.19
80	51.9	65.5	1.26	57.3	70.4	1.23	58.0	71.5	1.23	58.1	73.6	1.27
85	36.5	50.3	1.38	42.0	56.2	1.34	42.5	56.9	1.34	44.5	61.8	1.39
90	19.7	31.3	1.59	23.8	36.8	1.54	24.4	37.3	1.53	27.5	44.4	1.61
95	6.7	13.2	1.99	8.9	17.2	1.93	9.1	17.1	1.87	11.5	23.5	2.05
100	1.179	3.124	2.65	1.750	4.694	2.68	1.848	4.569	2.47	2.576	7.425	2.88
105	0.093	0.338	3.63	0.153	0.608	3.97	0.168	0.570	3.39	0.253	1.090	4.31
110	0.003	0.015	5.00	0.006	0.033	5.50	0.006	0.029	4.83	0.010	0.063	6.30

Data source: US Mortality DataBase, 2025.

== Past life expectancy, 1940–2019 ==
State/Territory	2019	2010	2000	1990	1980	1970	1960	1950	1940	Change 1940-2019
United States	78.8	78.7	76.8	75.4	73.7	70.8	69.7	68.1	64.0	▲14.8
Alabama	75.5	75.3	74.4	73.7	72.3	69.2	67.9	65.9	60.2	▲15.3
Alaska	78.2	77.9	76.2	75.0	72.4	69.2	67.2	65.8	58.1	▲20.1
American; Samoa	74.8	71.6	71.4	70.9	70.2	69.3	67.0	N/A	N/A	N/A
Arizona	79.3	79.1	77.1	76.2	74.2	70.9	69.3	66.1	59.0	▲20.3
Arkansas	75.9	76.0	74.8	74.4	73.3	70.8	69.9	69.0	64.3	▲11.6
California	81.2	80.5	78.1	75.8	74.3	71.8	70.8	69.3	65.3	▲15.9
Colorado	80.2	80.0	78.4	77.2	75.4	72.1	70.9	69.2	64.7	▲15.5
Connecticut	80.6	80.7	78.3	77.1	74.9	72.6	71.1	70.1	66.3	▲14.3
Delaware	78.4	78.2	76.4	75.0	73.2	69.9	69.1	67.1	65.0	▲13.4
District of Columbia	78.5	76.8	72.1	67.4	68.9	65.2	66.3	63.7	56.0	▲22.5
Florida	79.6	78.9	77.0	75.7	73.8	70.8	69.9	67.8	61.6	▲18.0
(Georgia (U.S. state)) Georgia	77.7	77.2	75.1	73.8	72.1	68.4	67.5	65.8	60.2	▲17.5
Guam	79.9	77.0	75.0	71.9	69.3	65.7	61.0	N/A	N/A	N/A
Hawaii	81.6	81.2	79.5	78.2	77.1	74.0	71.3	70.0	65.8	▲15.8
Idaho	79.6	79.4	78.1	77.2	75.2	72.0	71.4	69.2	66.9	▲12.7
Illinois	79.3	78.9	76.6	74.9	73.3	70.1	69.6	68.0	64.8	▲14.5
Indiana	77.1	77.5	76.0	75.4	73.9	70.9	70.3	68.6	64.9	▲12.2
Iowa	79.1	79.6	78.3	77.5	75.8	72.6	71.9	70.5	68.1	▲11.0
Kansas	78.3	78.5	77.4	77.0	75.2	72.8	71.9	70.3	67.3	▲11.0
Kentucky	75.6	75.8	75.1	74.4	72.8	70.0	69.6	67.5	62.1	▲13.5
Louisiana	76.0	75.7	74.1	73.1	71.6	68.7	67.9	66.6	61.2	▲14.8
Maine	78.4	79.1	77.6	76.6	74.4	70.7	70.2	69.1	64.8	▲13.6
Maryland	79.0	78.9	76.2	74.9	73.3	70.2	68.6	67.1	61.6	▲17.4
Massachusetts	80.7	80.5	78.2	76.8	74.8	71.9	70.5	69.7	65.7	▲15.0
Michigan	78.1	78.0	76.4	75.1	73.7	70.7	70.2	68.5	65.1	▲13.0
Minnesota	80.6	80.8	79.0	77.8	76.1	73.0	71.8	70.5	67.9	▲12.7
Mississippi	74.5	74.8	73.4	73.1	71.8	68.4	67.6	65.5	60.3	▲14.2
Missouri	77.2	77.4	76.0	75.3	73.6	70.6	70.2	68.6	64.5	▲12.7
Montana	78.6	78.5	77.3	76.4	73.8	70.8	69.6	68.1	65.0	▲13.6
Nebraska	79.4	79.6	78.3	76.9	75.4	72.5	72.0	70.7	68.3	▲11.1
Nevada	78.3	77.8	75.9	74.5	72.6	69.3	67.6	66.0	61.6	▲16.7
New Hampshire	79.6	80.3	78.5	77.0	75.1	71.6	70.7	69.3	66.2	▲13.4
New Jersey	80.5	79.9	77.3	75.4	73.8	71.0	69.9	68.4	64.5	▲16.0
New Mexico	77.2	78.1	77.1	76.0	73.8	70.5	69.3	65.9	59.0	▲18.2
New York	81.2	80.2	77.6	74.6	73.4	70.5	69.7	68.2	64.9	▲16.3
North Carolina	77.8	77.8	75.6	74.7	73.0	69.3	68.2	66.9	61.9	▲15.9
North Dakota	79.2	79.6	78.8	77.5	75.6	73.0	71.5	70.0	67.4	▲11.8
Northern Mariana; Islands	76.1	76.4	75.8	74.3	73.6	71.4	69.3	N/A	N/A	N/A
Ohio	77.0	77.6	76.3	75.3	73.3	70.8	70.2	68.7	64.7	▲12.3
Oklahoma	75.9	75.7	75.0	75.0	73.6	71.1	70.8	69.8	65.3	▲10.6
Oregon	79.6	79.5	77.8	76.5	74.9	72.4	71.0	69.8	66.9	▲12.7
Pennsylvania	78.5	78.4	76.7	75.4	73.3	70.4	69.5	67.7	63.9	▲14.6
Puerto Rico	79.8	78.4	76.7	74.2	73.7	71.5	68.7	N/A	N/A	N/A
Rhode Island	79.8	79.5	78.0	76.4	74.6	71.7	70.6	68.5	65.5	▲14.3
South Carolina	76.9	76.7	74.7	73.6	71.8	68.1	66.1	64.3	57.1	▲19.8
South Dakota	78.5	79.2	78.0	77.1	74.8	72.3	70.5	69.8	67.1	▲11.4
Tennessee	75.8	76.1	74.7	74.2	73.1	70.0	69.4	67.1	62.4	▲13.4
Texas	78.8	78.3	76.5	75.2	73.6	70.8	70.2	67.8	62.8	▲16.0
Utah	79.9	79.8	78.6	78.0	75.8	72.8	71.8	69.9	66.8	▲13.1
U.S. Virgin; Islands	79.6	78.0	76.6	74.2	71.7	69.1	66.2	N/A	N/A	N/A
Vermont	79.9	80.0	78.2	76.7	74.3	71.9	70.4	69.3	65.6	▲14.3
Virginia	79.3	79.0	76.8	75.3	73.3	70.2	68.7	66.4	59.9	▲19.4
Washington	80.2	80.0	78.2	76.8	75.0	71.9	71.1	69.4	66.4	▲13.8
West Virginia	74.7	75.4	74.9	74.4	72.6	69.2	69.6	67.4	62.8	▲11.9
Wisconsin	79.3	79.6	78.0	76.9	75.3	72.5	71.1	69.7	67.4	▲11.9
Wyoming	78.3	78.0	77.1	76.4	73.8	70.8	69.2	68.0	65.1	▲13.2

== Life expectancy in counties with 500,000+ people in 2019 ==
Life expectancy by U.S. county (years)
County	State	Total	White	Hispanic	Black	Asian
Los Angeles	California	82.4	81.2	84.4	76.1	87.7
Cook	Illinois	79.7	81.1	85.6	73.3	89
Harris	Texas	79.9	79.2	84.3	74.8	87.5
Maricopa	Arizona	80.5	80.7	81.6	77	87.2
San Diego	California	82.2	81.4	84.1	78.2	87.9
Orange	California	83.2	81.7	84.7	81	88.1
Miami-Dade	Florida	82.4	80.1	84.2	77	91.1
Dallas	Texas	79.1	78.8	84.4	74.9	87.7
Kings	New York	82.9	83.8	83.5	81.4	89.2
Riverside	California	80.9	79.5	83.6	77.5	87
Clark	Nevada	79	77.4	86	74.7	85.4
King	Washington	82.4	82.1	86.4	77.6	87.8
Queens	New York	84.1	82.2	88.3	81.5	89.9
San Bernardino	California	78.8	76.5	81.8	75	86.7
Tarrant	Texas	79.3	78.6	85	76.6	86.8
Bexar	Texas	78.9	78.5	79.6	75.6	87.9
Broward	Florida	81.5	79.6	86.9	80.8	89
Santa Clara	California	84.9	83.1	84.3	79.7	90
Wayne	Michigan	75.5	77.5	80.2	72.2	90.4
Alameda	California	83.1	82.2	84.5	75.7	88.6
New York	New York	85.3	87.6	86	77.1	90.3
Middlesex	Massachusetts	82.4	81.9	89.6	82.7	90.5
Philadelphia	Pennsylvania	76.4	77.2	80	73.6	89.5
Sacramento	California	79.6	78.9	82.8	75.1	84.9
Palm Beach	Florida	82.6	81.9	87	81	92.1
Hillsborough	Florida	79.6	79	82.9	76.5	89.5
Suffolk	New York	80.9	80.6	85.7	78.1	88.9
Orange	Florida	80.6	79.6	83.8	78.3	89.5
Bronx	New York	80.9	79.1	83.4	79	91.7
Nassau	New York	83.1	82.7	87.7	81.2	90.7
Franklin	Ohio	77.2	77.6	90.3	74.3	87.1
Travis	Texas	81.9	81.5	84.9	77.6	88.8
Hennepin	Minnesota	81.3	81.9	88.5	77.3	85.8
Oakland	Michigan	80.4	80.6	83.9	77.2	92.6
Cuyahoga	Ohio	77	78.3	82.7	73.6	89
Allegheny	Pennsylvania	78.1	78.9	90	72.4	86.4
Salt Lake	Utah	79.8	79.4	82.8	75.6	83.8
Contra Costa	California	82.5	81.9	85.2	76.6	88.4
Fairfax	Virginia	85.6	84.7	92	84.1	90.3
Wake	North Carolina	81.8	82.4	87.4	78.1	90.4
Mecklenburg	North Carolina	80.6	81.7	88.6	77	87.3
Fulton	(Georgia (U.S. state)) Georgia	79.6	82.8	87.7	75.4	88.9
Collin	Texas	82.7	81.8	87.4	80.4	90
Pima	Arizona	79.5	79.5	80.7	75.7	88.1
Montgomery	Maryland	84.6	83.8	92.4	82.1	90.2
Fresno	California	78.9	78	81	72.1	81.7
St. Louis	Missouri	78	79.9	86.9	71.7	89.1
Pinellas	Florida	79.2	79.1	84.8	74.9	88.4
Duval	Florida	76.1	75.7	83.8	74.2	88.7
Marion	Indiana	76	76.5	86.8	73.3	84.9
Westchester	New York	83.6	83.5	89.1	80.7	92.7
Honolulu	Hawaii	82.5	81.9	76.6	86	83.2
Milwaukee	Wisconsin	76.9	78.6	82.5	71.7	83.5
Gwinnett	(Georgia (U.S. state)) Georgia	81.2	80	88.2	80.1	86.7
Fairfield	Connecticut	83	82.8	87.7	80.8	94.2
Shelby	Tennessee	75.5	78	86.5	73.2	86.3
Bergen	New Jersey	83.2	81.9	88.3	80.3	92.4
Denton	Texas	82	81.1	89	80.5	88.6
DuPage	Illinois	82.5	81.8	87.6	78.1	90.6
Erie	New York	78.7	79.4	81.3	74	88.8
Pierce	Washington	79	79	84	76.1	82.8
Prince George's	Maryland	79.6	79.2	86.6	78.6	89.2
Kern	California	77.5	75.6	81.1	72.3	84.1
Hartford	Connecticut	80.2	80.1	81.9	79.1	90.1
Hidalgo	Texas	81.9	81.3	81.3	88.3	94.8
Macomb	Michigan	78	78.3	83	73.5	87.8
San Francisco	California	84	83.3	85.4	73.1	87.8
New Haven	Connecticut	80.1	80	83.7	77.5	98.8
Ventura	California	82.5	81.5	84.7	80.8	89.3
El Paso	Texas	80.1	76.7	81	78.5	86.1
Fort Bend	Texas	83	81.5	86.5	80.5	89
Montgomery	Pennsylvania	80.9	80.8	86.8	77.9	88.6
Snohomish	Washington	80.5	79.7	85.6	83.3	88.7
Worcester	Massachusetts	79.3	79.3	82.1	81.5	90
Baltimore	Maryland	78.1	78	90.5	76.5	89.4
Middlesex	New Jersey	81.7	79.4	85.8	80	90.4
Hamilton	Ohio	76.6	77.7	97.3	73.1	86.1
Multnomah	Oregon	79.7	79.6	85.2	74.1	84.3
Oklahoma	Oklahoma	76.1	76.3	82.4	72.9	83.8
Suffolk	Massachusetts	81.6	80.7	89	79.7	90.9
Essex	New Jersey	79.8	82.1	84.8	75.6	93.8
Essex	Massachusetts	80.2	79.8	86.4	80	89
Lee	Florida	82.5	81.7	85.2	81	97.6
San Joaquin	California	78.6	77.3	81.8	72	83.2
Jefferson	Kentucky	76.1	76.5	89.2	73.3	82.7
Cobb	(Georgia (U.S. state)) Georgia	80.7	80.6	88.7	78.7	89.2
DeKalb	(Georgia (U.S. state)) Georgia	80.4	82.7	87	78.4	90.4
San Mateo	California	85	83.4	87.8	79	89.5
Polk	Florida	78.6	78.1	82.8	75.7	91
Monroe	New York	79.8	80.7	80.6	74.5	88.4
Denver	Colorado	79.9	81	79.6	75.4	86.5
El Paso	Colorado	78.9	79	79.8	75.3	85.9
District of Columbia	District of Columbia	79	88	88.3	72.7	89.9
Norfolk	Massachusetts	81.9	81.3	88.8	81.7	90.9
Jackson	Missouri	77.2	78.4	83.4	72.8	86.3
Davidson	Tennessee	77	77.7	88.6	74	86.3
Lake	Illinois	81.6	81.4	85.1	75.1	91.2
Will	Illinois	79.8	79.3	85.3	77	92.1
Bernalillo	New Mexico	78.4	79.3	78	74.6	86.4
Hudson	New Jersey	82.6	79.5	86.4	75.8	92.2
Kent	Michigan	80	80.4	85.1	74.7	92.9
Tulsa	Oklahoma	76.8	77.4	85.7	71.3	83.6
Arapahoe	Colorado	81.3	81.2	83.7	79.4	87.6
Jefferson	Alabama	74.6	76	79.1	72.7	83.6
Utah	Utah	80.6	80.3	86.9	77.9	82.9
Providence	Rhode Island	79.4	78.5	91.3	82.8	85.9
Bucks	Pennsylvania	79.9	79.5	87.8	78.2	89.1
Montgomery	Texas	79.7	78.9	86.5	77.4	92.8
Monmouth	New Jersey	80.6	80.4	83.8	75.8	89.6
Williamson	Texas	82.1	81.3	85.3	79.7	90.1
Ocean	New Jersey	79.1	78.8	85.6	76.5	91.3
Brevard	Florida	77.8	77.2	84.3	76.6	90.2
Johnson	Kansas	81.7	81.7	84.4	76.9	87.2
Washington	Oregon	82.7	82.1	88.7	84.3	87.8
Baltimore City	Maryland	72.8	75.7	92.8	70.6	95.3
Jefferson	Colorado	80.8	81	80	73.4	86.3
Anne Arundel	Maryland	79.3	79.1	86.4	78	85.1
Douglas	Nebraska	79.1	79.5	89.5	73.1	85.8
Pasco	Florida	77.8	76.8	83.8	78.5	87.6
Bristol	Massachusetts	78.7	78.9	84.7	83.6	91.8
Delaware	Pennsylvania	78.6	79	82.9	75.6	91.3
New Castle	Delaware	78.4	78.5	86.1	75.9	90.6
Volusia	Florida	76.8	76	82.4	75.3	86.8
Union	New Jersey	81.6	81.3	87.6	78	91.7
Dane	Wisconsin	81.8	82	85.2	73.7	89.5
Stanislaus	California	78.2	76.5	82.6	73.1	82.9
Ramsey	Minnesota	79.9	80.7	82.9	75.5	80.5
Lancaster	Pennsylvania	80.5	80.5	82.7	77.8	86.9
Guilford	North Carolina	78.1	78.7	88.1	75.6	89.2
Summit	Ohio	77.2	77.8	99.9	72.8	82.6
Greenville	South Carolina	78.4	78.6	86	75.5	87.7
Montgomery	Ohio	74.9	75.5	93.5	71.7	88.4
Kane	Illinois	81.6	80.9	88.2	77.1	87.6
Spokane	Washington	78.6	78.5	84.2	77.4	84.4
Chester	Pennsylvania	81.4	81.3	88.1	75.8	93.8
Plymouth	Massachusetts	79.8	79.5	86.9	85	88.5
Sedgwick	Kansas	77.6	77.9	82.8	72.9	89
Adams	Colorado	79.4	78.6	82.1	76.3	85.8
Camden	New Jersey	77.2	77.5	81.3	73.2	89.4
Passaic	New Jersey	80.6	79.7	87	74	90.5
Clark	Washington	80.1	79.8	85.7	77.2	85.8
Morris	New Jersey	82.6	81.9	88.9	79.5	91.9
Lake	Indiana	76.3	76.8	81.9	72.4	88

== Charts ==
The charts below compare life expectancy in the U.S. with life expectancy in other countries.

U.S. life expectancy and healthy life expectancy compared to other nations, 2019.

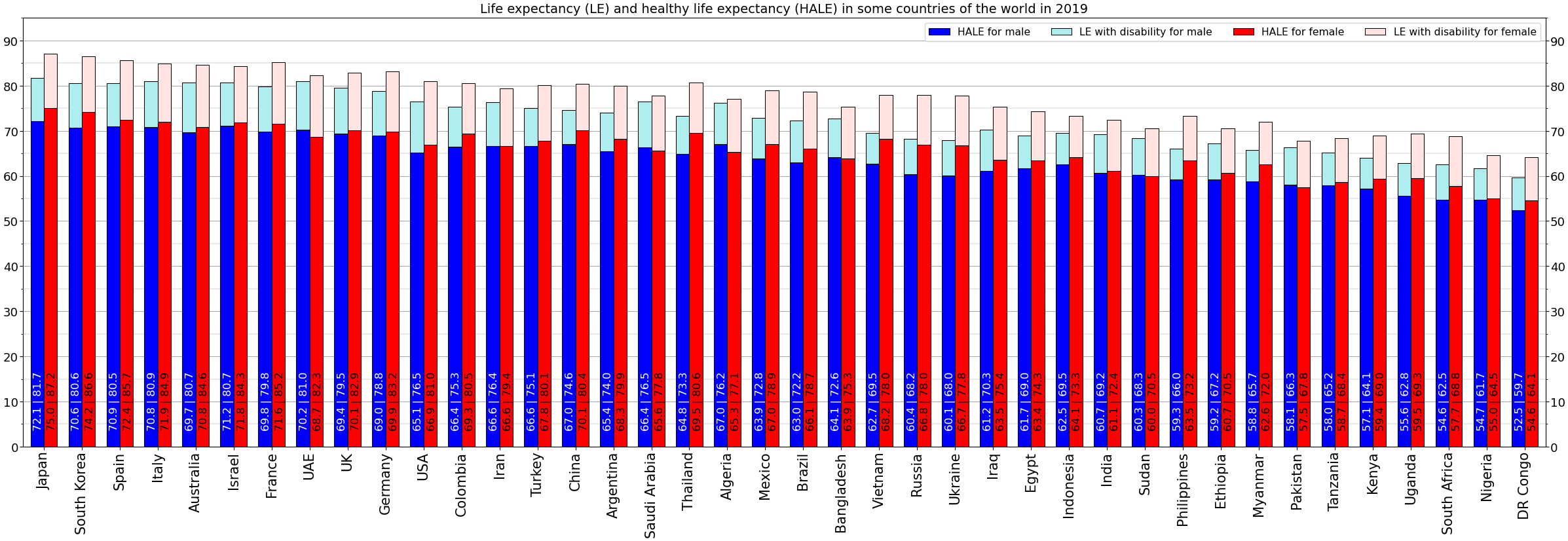
International life expectancy and healthy life expectancy for males and females, 2019.
U.S. life expectancy in comparison to Canada, 1831–2021.

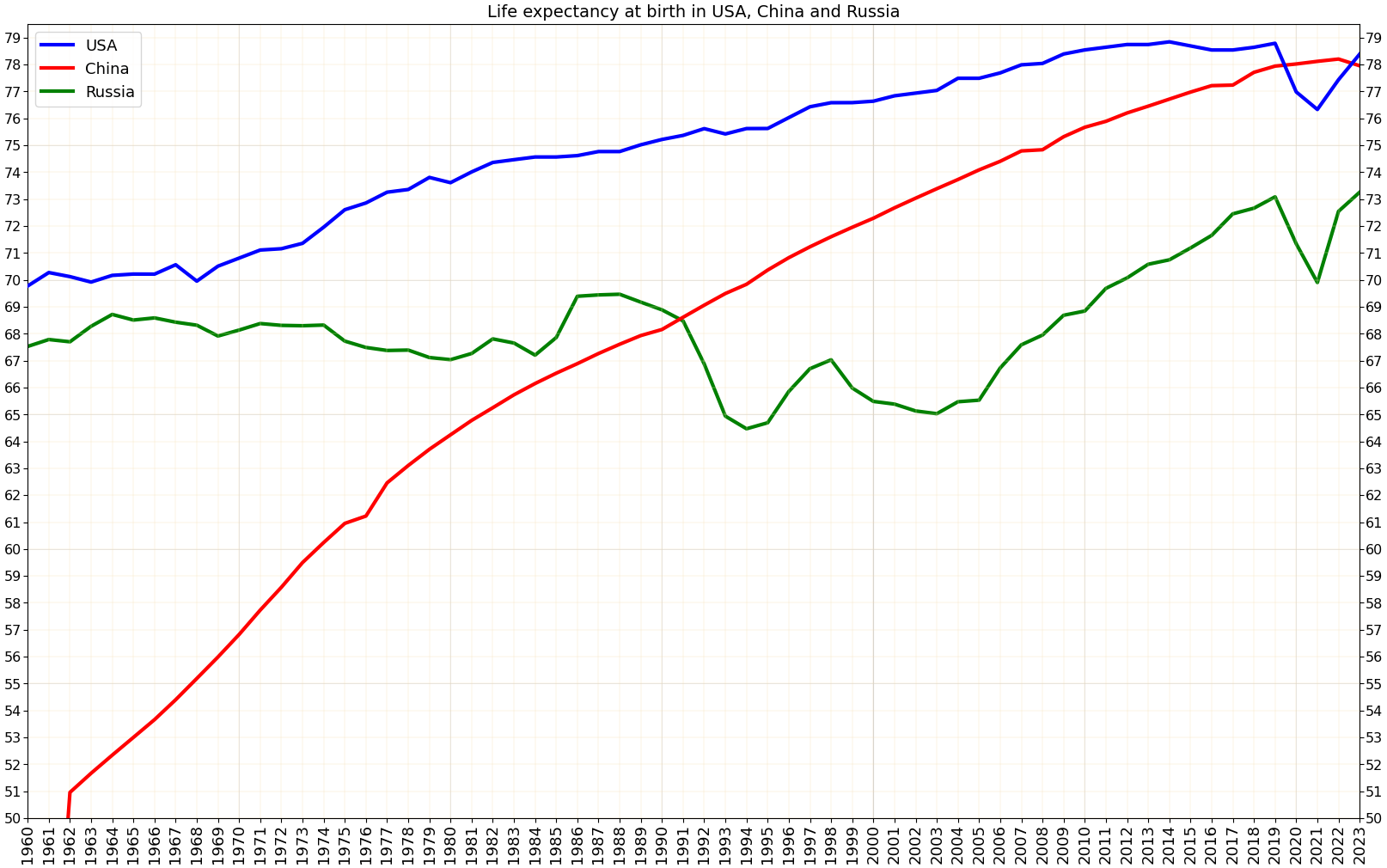
U.S. life expectancy in comparison to China and Russia, 1960–2023.

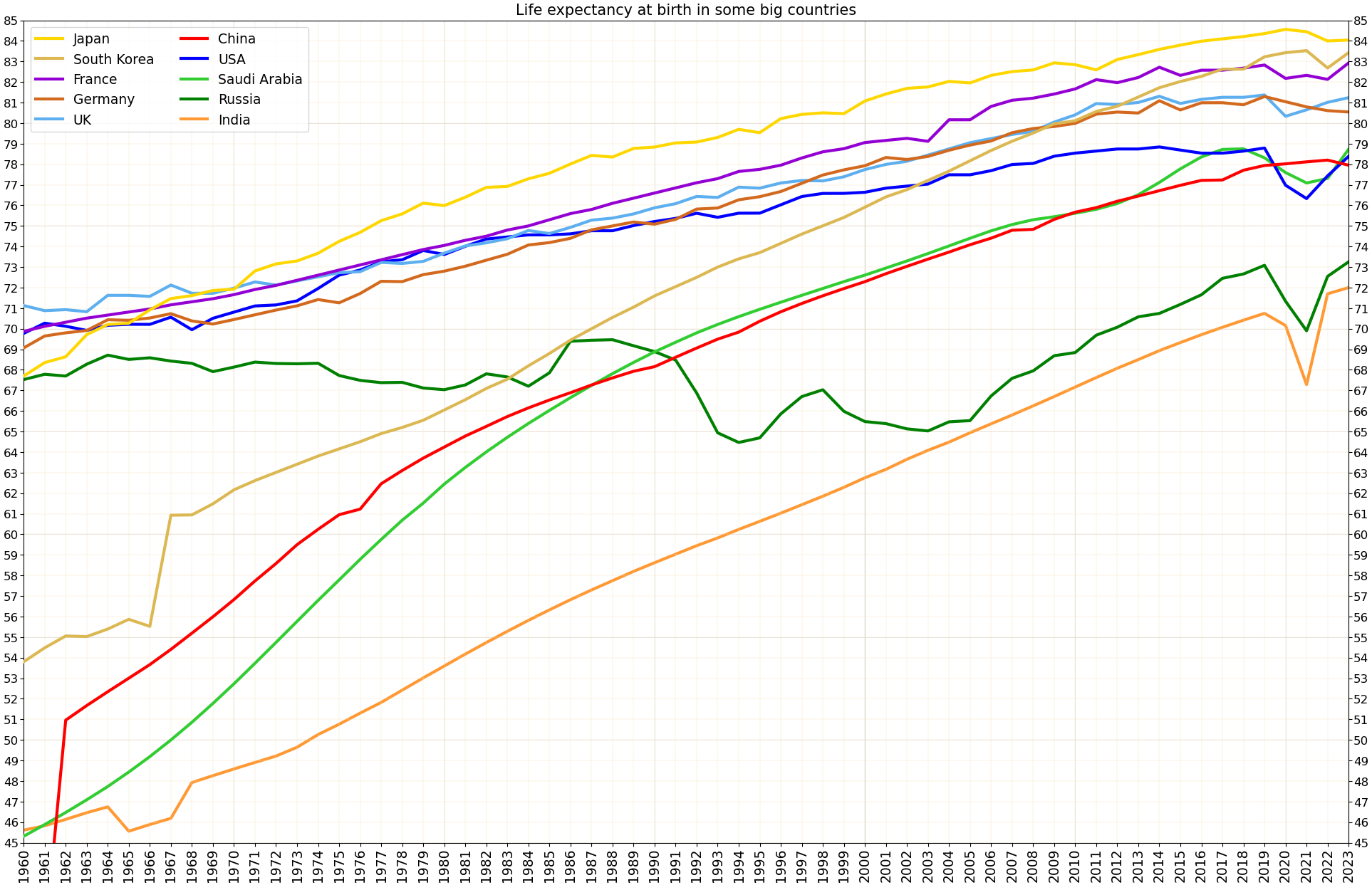
U.S. life expectancy in comparison to select countries, 1960–2023.

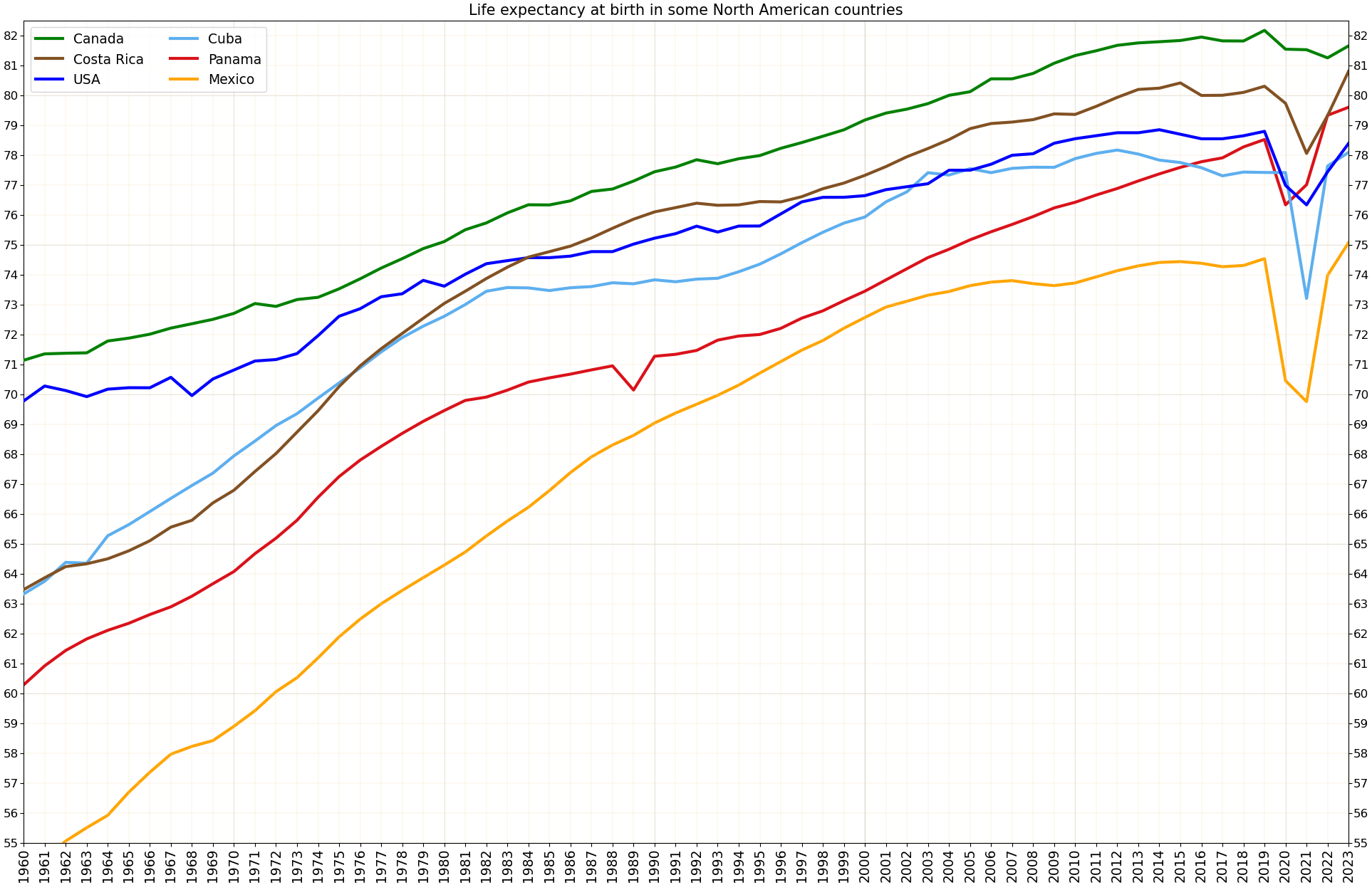
U.S. life expectancy compared to select North American nations, 1960–2022.

== See also ==
Domestic:

- List of U.S. congressional districts by life expectancy
- List of U.S. counties with shortest life expectancy
- List of U.S. counties with longest life expectancy
- List of U.S. states and territories by poverty rate
- Thank God for Mississippi
- Hispanic paradox

International:

- List of countries by life expectancy
- List of North American countries by life expectancy
- List of Mexican states by life expectancy
- List of Canadian provinces and territories by life expectancy
- List of European regions by life expectancy
