= United Nations Project Office on Governance =

The United Nations Project Office on Governance (UNPOG) was established in 2006 as a subsidiary organization of the United Nations Department of Economic and Social Affairs (UNDESA) and is headquartered in Seoul, the Republic of Korea. Its principal mission is to assist the United Nations Member States improve their governance capacity. Since its inception, it has conducted research and capacity-building activities and disseminated global and local best practices on participatory, transparent and effective democratic governance.

The office was established as an outcome of the Sixth Global Forum on Reinventing Government, hosted by the Republic of Korea in cooperation with the United Nations in May 2005. At the conclusion of the Sixth Global Forum, participants endorsed the Seoul Declaration on Participatory and Transparent Governance, which called for the creation of the United Nations Governance Centre (UNGC). A Technical Cooperation Trust Fund Agreement was concluded between the Republic of Korea and the United Nations in June 2006. The office was officially renamed to its current title in January 2009.

The office is in partnership with the United Nations Public Administration Network (UNPAN), which is operated by the Division for Public Administration and Development Management branch of the United Nations Department of Economic and Social Affairs.

== See also ==
- National Partnership for Reinventing Government – Similar U.S. project in 1990s
