= International Association of Homes and Services for the Aging =

The Global Ageing Network (formerly the International Association for Homes and Services for the Aging (IAHSA)) is an international, not-for-profit educational and charitable organization founded in 1994.

== Affiliations ==
The Global Ageing Network is a Non-Governmental Organization (NGO) in Special Consultative Status with the United Nations. It works with other organizations, including:

- AARP International
- Alzheimer's Disease International
- Helpage International
- International Coalition of Intergenerational Programs
- International Federation on Ageing
- International Longevity Center
- United Nations Department of Economic and Social Affairs

== Education ==
The Global Ageing Network hosts a biennial international conference. Past conference site have included:

- Amsterdam, The Netherlands
- Barcelona, Spain
- Honolulu, Hawaii, United States of America
- Vancouver, BC, Canada
- Sydney, Australia
- Trondheim, Norway
- St. Julian's, Malta
- London, England
- Washington, D.C.
- Shanghai, China
- Perth, Australia

== Membership ==
The Global Ageing Network membership is open providers of aging services, governments, universities, individuals and corporations.

== Global Ageing Network ==
Global Ageing Network Members are from the following countries: Australia, Austria, Canada, People's Republic of China, Czech Republic, Croatia, Denmark, Ecuador, Finland, France, Germany, India, Italy, Japan, South Korea, Hong Kong, Malta, The Netherlands, New Zealand, Norway, Portugal, Russia, Singapore, South Africa, Spain, Sweden, Switzerland, Taiwan, Thailand, United Kingdom, Ukraine and the United States of America.
