= United Nations Department of Economic and Social Affairs =

International organization in New York, United States

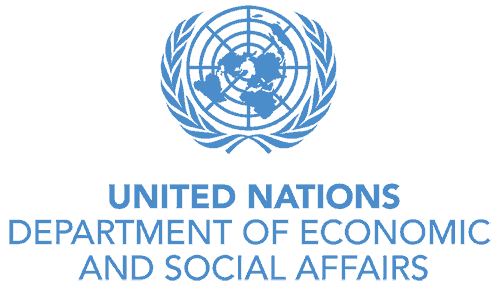
- Abbreviation: UNDESA
- Formation: 1948; 78 years ago
- Type: Department
- Legal status: Active
- Headquarters: New York City
- Head: Li Junhua (since 2022); China
- Website: www.un.org/en/desa

The United Nations Department of Economic and Social Affairs (UNDESA) (Note: Official UN policy is to avoid this acronym or its variant DESA in official contexts.) is part of the United Nations Secretariat and is responsible for the follow-up to major United Nations summits and conferences, as well as services to the United Nations Economic and Social Council and the Second and Third Committees of the United Nations General Assembly. UNDESA assists countries around the world in agenda-setting and decision-making with the goal of meeting their economic, social and environmental challenges. It supports international cooperation to promote sustainable development for all, having as a foundation the 2030 Agenda for Sustainable Development and the 17 Sustainable Development Goals (SDGs) as adopted by the UN General Assembly on 25 September 2015. In providing a broad range of analytical products, policy advice, and technical assistance, UNDESA effectively translates global commitments in the economic, social and environmental spheres into national policies and actions and continues to play a key role in monitoring progress towards internationally agreed-upon development goals. It is also a member of the United Nations Development Group. Since 2007, leadership positions in UNDESA have been held by representatives from the People's Republic of China (PRC). UNDESA has been used to promote the PRC's Belt and Road Initiative.

UNDESA was formerly known as the UN Department of International Economic and Social Affairs (DIESA). It resulted from the merger of the Departments for Policy Coordination and Sustainable Development, for Economic and Social Information and Policy Analysis, and for Development Support and Management Services (DDSMS) in 1997. The DDSMS in turn was formerly known as the Department of Technical Cooperation for Development (DTCD) from its founding in 1978 until 1993.

== See also ==
- World Population Prospects
- Declaration on the Rights of Indigenous Peoples
- Financing for Development
- Human development (humanity)
- Indigenous intellectual property
- International Association of Homes and Services for the Aging
- United Nations Conference on Sustainable Development
- United Nations Forum on Forests
- United Nations Project Office on Governance
