= Hannah Ritchie =

Scottish data scientist (born 1993)

- Education: University of Edinburgh
- Scientific career
- Fields: Climate change Global development Food systems Energy; Malnutrition
- Workplaces: University of Oxford
- Thesis: Global food systems: addressing malnutrition through sustainable system pathways (2018)
- Doctoral advisor: David Reay; Pete Higgins
- Website: hannahritchie.com

Hannah Ritchie (born 1993) is a Scottish data scientist who is a senior researcher at the University of Oxford in the Oxford Martin School, and deputy editor at Our World in Data. Her work focuses on sustainability, in relation to climate change, energy, food and agriculture, biodiversity, air pollution, deforestation, and public health.

She has published two books, Not the End of the World in 2024 and Clearing the Air in 2025.

== Early life and education ==
Hannah Ritchie was born in 1993 in Falkirk, Scotland, United Kingdom. She trained in environmental science at the University of Edinburgh. She earned her undergraduate degree in environmental geoscience and a master's degree in carbon management.

She remained in Scotland for her PhD, researching malnutrition and global food systems. She created a scalable framework to understand food system pathways and identify losses, allocations, and conversions. In particular, she looked to understand whether it was possible to feed a growing population without damaging the environment. Ritchie is vegan.

== Research ==
Ritchie started her career as a lecturer in sustainability at the University of Edinburgh. She developed teaching programs focused on sustainability. She left Edinburgh to start a research position at the University of Oxford, where she developed data visualisations to communicate information.

Ritchie's early work considered food systems and how it was essential to adapt to meet the Sustainable Development Goals. For example, she has argued that for most foods, the carbon footprint is barely impacted by transport.

In 2017, Ritchie joined Our World in Data as Head of Research. Her work focuses on environmental sustainability, including topics such as climate change, energy, food and agriculture, biodiversity, air pollution, and deforestation. During the COVID-19 pandemic, she built the Our World in Data COVID-19 information dashboard. In 2023 she became Deputy Editor and Lead Researcher.

In 2024, she was elected to Scotland's Just Transition Commission, "an independent advisory body that provides scrutiny and advice on how to deliver a just transition to a low-carbon economy in Scotland".

In 2024, Chatto & Windus published Ritchie's first book, Not the End of the World, which explores her optimism for large-scale problem-solving and ending climate change.

In 2025, Ritchie published a second book, titled Clearing the Air.

She also authors a newsletter titled "Sustainability by numbers", with over 60,000 subscribers.

== Recognition ==
In 2022 Ritchie was named Scotland's Youth Climate Champion at the Holyrood Green Giant Awards in recognition of her contributions to the climate-change movement. In 2024, Ritchie was recognised for lifetime achievement with honorary fellowship of the Royal Statistical Society.

In 2025, she received the honorary award "Inspiration from Abroad" from the jury of the Climate Change Communication Award, presented by the United Nations Information Center in Prague and the Learned Society of the Czech Republic.

== Selected publications ==
=== Books ===
- Ritchie, Hannah (2024). Not the End of the World: How We Can Be the First Generation to Build a Sustainable Planet. Chatto & Windus. ISBN 9781784745004.
- Ritchie, Hannah (2025). Clearing the Air: A Hopeful Guide to Solving Climate Change — in 50 Questions and Answers. Chatto & Windus. ISBN 9781784745745.

=== Articles ===
- Roser, Max; Ritchie, Hannah; Ortiz-Ospina, Esteban; Rodés-Guirao, Lucas (9 May 2013). "World Population Growth". Our World in Data.
- Hannah Ritchie; Edouard Mathieu; Lucas Rodés-Guirao; et al. (2020). "Coronavirus Pandemic (COVID-19)". Our World in Data. Wikidata Q113387718.
- Ritchie, Hannah; Roser, Max; Rosado, Pablo (11 May 2020). "CO₂ and Greenhouse Gas Emissions". Our World in Data.
- Edouard Mathieu; Hannah Ritchie; Esteban Ortiz-Ospina; Max Roser; Joe Hasell; Cameron Appel; Charlie Giattino; Lucas Rodés-Guirao (10 May 2021). "A global database of COVID-19 vaccinations". Nature Human Behaviour. doi:10.1038/s41562-021-01122-8. ISSN 2397-3374. Wikidata Q107202624.
- Ritchie, Hannah (January 2024). "What We Learned from Acid Rain: By working together, the nations of the world can solve climate change". Scientific American. 330 (1): 75–76.
