= List of Mexican states by life expectancy =

The following is the list of the States of Mexico by life expectancy. The country is administratively divided into 32 federative entities (Spanish: entidades federativas): 31 states and Mexico City. Mexico has seen declines in some states due to increasing crime in many Mexican cities, especially Ciudad Juarez.

The Data in the 2017 and 2010 columns come from the IHME GBD Results tool. Life Expectancy In Mexico saw large increases before 1990 but recent events involving increased drug activity and increased crime within the cities of Mexico. For example, Campeche had a Life Expectancy in 2010 of 76.30 years and it has declined to 75.07 years. This was primarily due to increased cartel activity within the state.

According to estimation of the National Institute of Statistics and Geography (abbr. INEGI), in 2023 life expectancy in the country was 75.3 years (72.3 for male, 78.6 for female).

According to estimation of the United Nations, in 2023 life expectancy in Mexico was 75.07 years (72.24 for male, 77.81 for female).

Estimation of the World Bank Group for Mexico for 2023 is exactly the same: 75.07 years (72.24 for male, 77.81 for female).

According to estimation of the WHO for 2019, at that year life expectancy in Mexico was 75.83 years (72.80 for male and 78.89 for female).
And healthy life expectancy was 65.46 years (63.92 for male and 67.02 for female).

== National Institute of Statistics and Geography (2013–2025) ==
In 2013, Mexico had a local maximum in life expectancy, so this year has been added to the table for comparison.

States	2025				Historical data																
States	All	Male	Female	Sex gap	2013	2013 →2019	2019	2019 →2020	2020	2020 →2021	2021	2021 →2022	2022	2022 →2023	2023	2023 →2024	2024	2024 →2025	2025	2019 →2025	2013 →2025
Mexico on average	75.7	72.6	79.0	6.4	75.2	−0.4	74.8	−5.9	68.9	−0.1	68.8	6.4	75.2	0.1	75.3	0.2	75.5	0.2	75.7	0.9	0.5
Nuevo León	77.9	74.9	81.1	6.2	77.8	−0.5	77.3	−5.7	71.6	−0.5	71.1	6.3	77.4	0.2	77.6	0.1	77.7	0.2	77.9	0.6	0.1
Baja California Sur	77.3	74.4	80.5	6.1	76.9	−0.2	76.7	−4.2	72.5	−2.9	69.6	7.2	76.8	0.2	77.0	0.2	77.2	0.1	77.3	0.6	0.4
Coahuila	77.2	74.3	80.5	6.2	77.2	−0.5	76.7	−6.8	69.9	2.9	72.8	4.0	76.8	0.1	76.9	0.2	77.1	0.1	77.2	0.5	0.0
Aguascalientes	77.0	74.0	80.3	6.3	76.4	0.1	76.5	−6.4	70.1	1.3	71.4	5.1	76.5	0.2	76.7	0.1	76.8	0.2	77.0	0.5	0.6
Mexico City	77.0	74.0	80.2	6.2	77.0	−0.5	76.5	−7.3	69.2	1.1	70.3	6.2	76.5	0.1	76.6	0.2	76.8	0.2	77.0	0.5	0.0
Sonora	76.9	74.0	80.1	6.1	76.5	−0.2	76.3	−6.4	69.9	1.2	71.1	5.3	76.4	0.2	76.6	0.2	76.8	0.1	76.9	0.6	0.4
Chihuahua	76.8	73.8	80.0	6.2	76.1	0.1	76.2	−6.7	69.5	2.9	72.4	3.9	76.3	0.1	76.4	0.2	76.6	0.2	76.8	0.6	0.7
Baja California	76.7	73.8	80.0	6.2	75.7	0.4	76.1	−7.2	68.9	2.3	71.2	5.0	76.2	0.2	76.4	0.2	76.6	0.1	76.7	0.6	1.0
Querétaro	76.4	73.4	79.7	6.3	75.8	0.1	75.9	−5.5	70.4	−2.6	67.8	8.1	75.9	0.2	76.1	0.2	76.3	0.1	76.4	0.5	0.6
Colima	76.3	73.3	79.6	6.3	76.2	−0.5	75.7	−3.6	72.1	−2.4	69.7	6.1	75.8	0.2	76.0	0.2	76.2	0.1	76.3	0.6	0.1
Sinaloa	76.3	73.3	79.5	6.2	75.7	0.0	75.7	−5.5	70.2	0.9	71.1	4.7	75.8	0.1	75.9	0.2	76.1	0.2	76.3	0.6	0.6
Jalisco	76.2	73.2	79.5	6.3	75.7	−0.1	75.6	−4.4	71.2	−1.8	69.4	6.3	75.7	0.1	75.8	0.2	76.0	0.2	76.2	0.6	0.5
Quintana Roo	76.2	73.2	79.4	6.2	75.9	−0.4	75.5	−6.9	68.6	−0.3	68.3	7.3	75.6	0.2	75.8	0.2	76.0	0.2	76.2	0.7	0.3
Tamaulipas	76.0	73.0	79.3	6.3	76.0	−0.5	75.5	−5.0	70.5	2.0	72.5	3.0	75.5	0.2	75.7	0.2	75.9	0.1	76.0	0.5	0.0
Nayarit	75.8	72.7	79.1	6.4	75.0	0.2	75.2	−3.6	71.6	−1.5	70.1	5.2	75.3	0.1	75.4	0.2	75.6	0.2	75.8	0.6	0.8
Durango	75.7	72.7	79.0	6.3	74.8	0.3	75.1	−5.3	69.8	1.2	71.0	4.2	75.2	0.1	75.3	0.2	75.5	0.2	75.7	0.6	0.9
San Luis Potosí	75.5	72.4	78.8	6.4	75.0	−0.1	74.9	−6.5	68.4	−0.4	68.0	6.9	74.9	0.2	75.1	0.2	75.3	0.2	75.5	0.6	0.5
Mexico (state)	75.3	72.3	78.6	6.3	74.9	−0.2	74.7	−8.0	66.7	0.1	66.8	7.9	74.7	0.2	74.9	0.2	75.1	0.2	75.3	0.6	0.4
Yucatán	75.2	72.1	78.5	6.4	74.9	−0.3	74.6	−3.9	70.7	−1.3	69.4	5.2	74.6	0.2	74.8	0.2	75.0	0.2	75.2	0.6	0.3
Guanajuato	75.1	72.0	78.4	6.4	75.0	−0.4	74.6	−6.3	68.3	−0.7	67.6	6.9	74.5	0.2	74.7	0.2	74.9	0.2	75.1	0.5	0.1
Campeche	74.7	71.6	78.1	6.5	75.4	−1.3	74.1	−6.1	68.0	0.2	68.2	5.9	74.1	0.2	74.3	0.2	74.5	0.2	74.7	0.6	−0.7
Zacatecas	74.6	71.4	78.0	6.6	75.0	−1.0	74.0	−6.3	67.7	−0.7	67.0	7.0	74.0	0.2	74.2	0.2	74.4	0.2	74.6	0.6	−0.4
Morelos	74.5	71.4	77.9	6.5	75.0	−1.0	74.0	−5.6	68.4	−2.3	66.1	7.8	73.9	0.2	74.1	0.2	74.3	0.2	74.5	0.5	−0.5
Tlaxcala	74.4	71.3	77.8	6.5	74.2	−0.4	73.8	−8.6	65.2	0.0	65.2	8.6	73.8	0.2	74.0	0.2	74.2	0.2	74.4	0.6	0.2
Michoacán	74.3	71.2	77.7	6.5	74.0	−0.2	73.8	−4.4	69.4	−2.9	66.5	7.2	73.7	0.2	73.9	0.2	74.1	0.2	74.3	0.5	0.3
Hidalgo	74.1	71.0	77.5	6.5	74.4	−0.9	73.5	−5.3	68.2	−1.1	67.1	6.4	73.5	0.2	73.7	0.2	73.9	0.2	74.1	0.6	−0.3
Puebla	74.1	71.0	77.5	6.5	73.8	−0.2	73.6	−6.3	67.3	−2.0	65.3	8.2	73.5	0.2	73.7	0.2	73.9	0.2	74.1	0.5	0.3
Tabasco	74.0	70.9	77.4	6.5	74.3	−0.9	73.4	−6.4	67.0	2.2	69.2	4.2	73.4	0.2	73.6	0.2	73.8	0.2	74.0	0.6	−0.3
Veracruz	73.9	70.8	77.3	6.5	74.3	−0.9	73.4	−4.1	69.3	−0.4	68.9	4.4	73.3	0.2	73.5	0.2	73.7	0.2	73.9	0.5	−0.4
Oaxaca	73.5	70.3	77.0	6.7	73.9	−0.9	73.0	−4.2	68.8	−1.9	66.9	6.0	72.9	0.2	73.1	0.2	73.3	0.2	73.5	0.5	−0.4
Guerrero	73.3	70.2	76.8	6.6	73.3	−0.5	72.8	−3.7	69.1	0.3	69.4	3.3	72.7	0.2	72.9	0.2	73.1	0.2	73.3	0.5	0.0
Chiapas	73.2	70.0	76.6	6.6	73.3	−0.7	72.6	−4.7	67.9	−0.2	67.7	4.9	72.6	0.2	72.8	0.2	73.0	0.2	73.2	0.6	−0.1

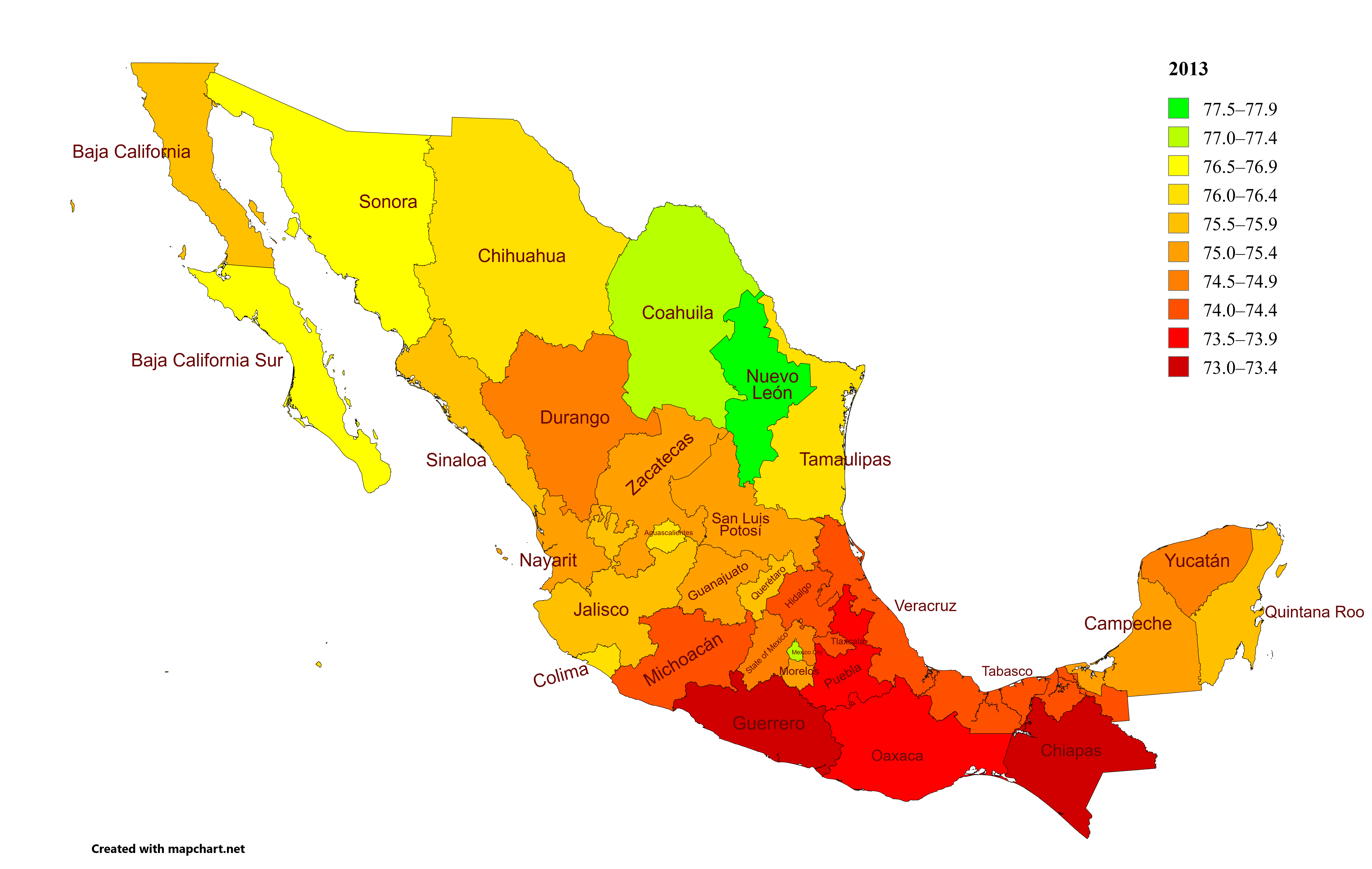
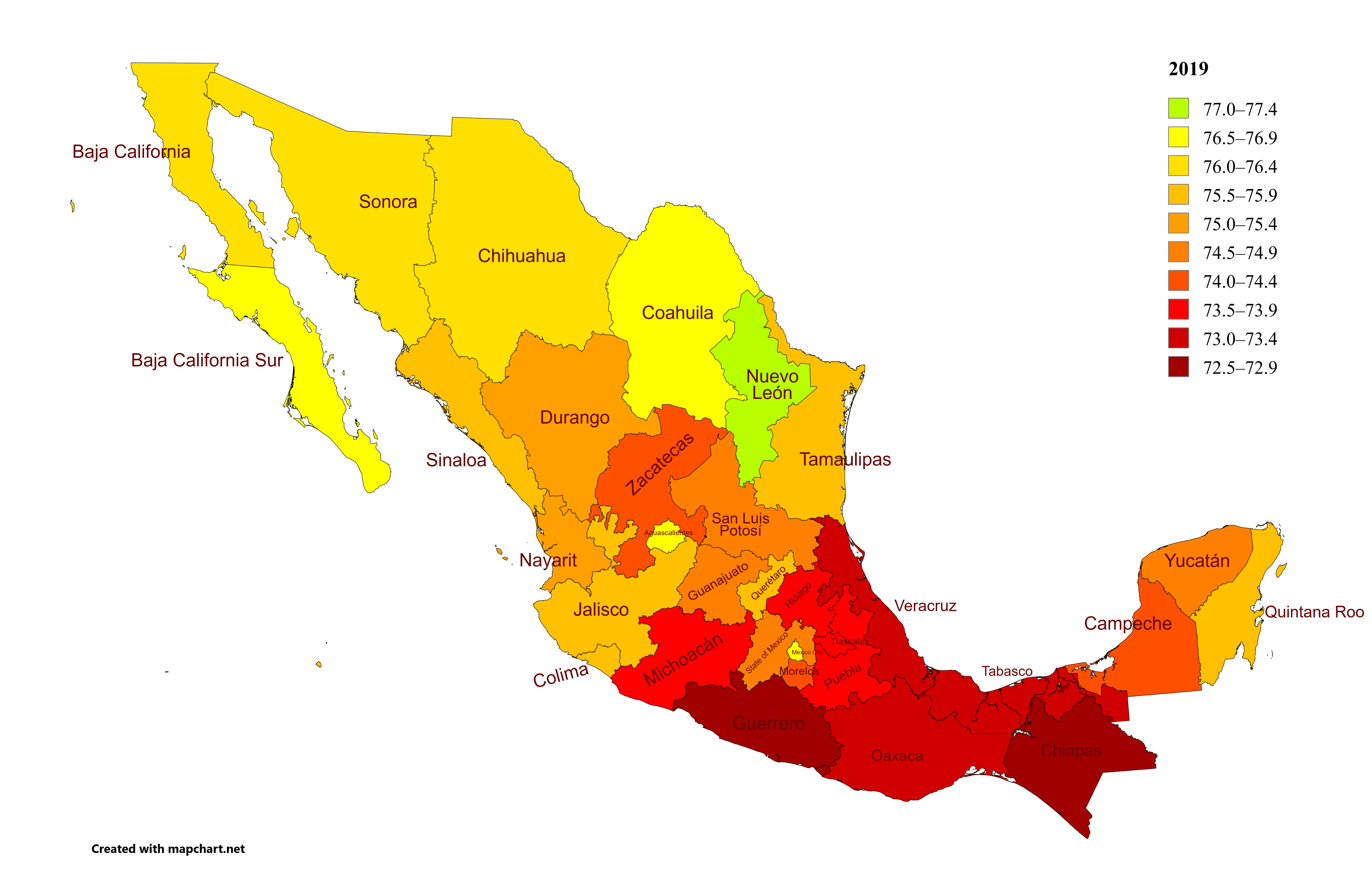
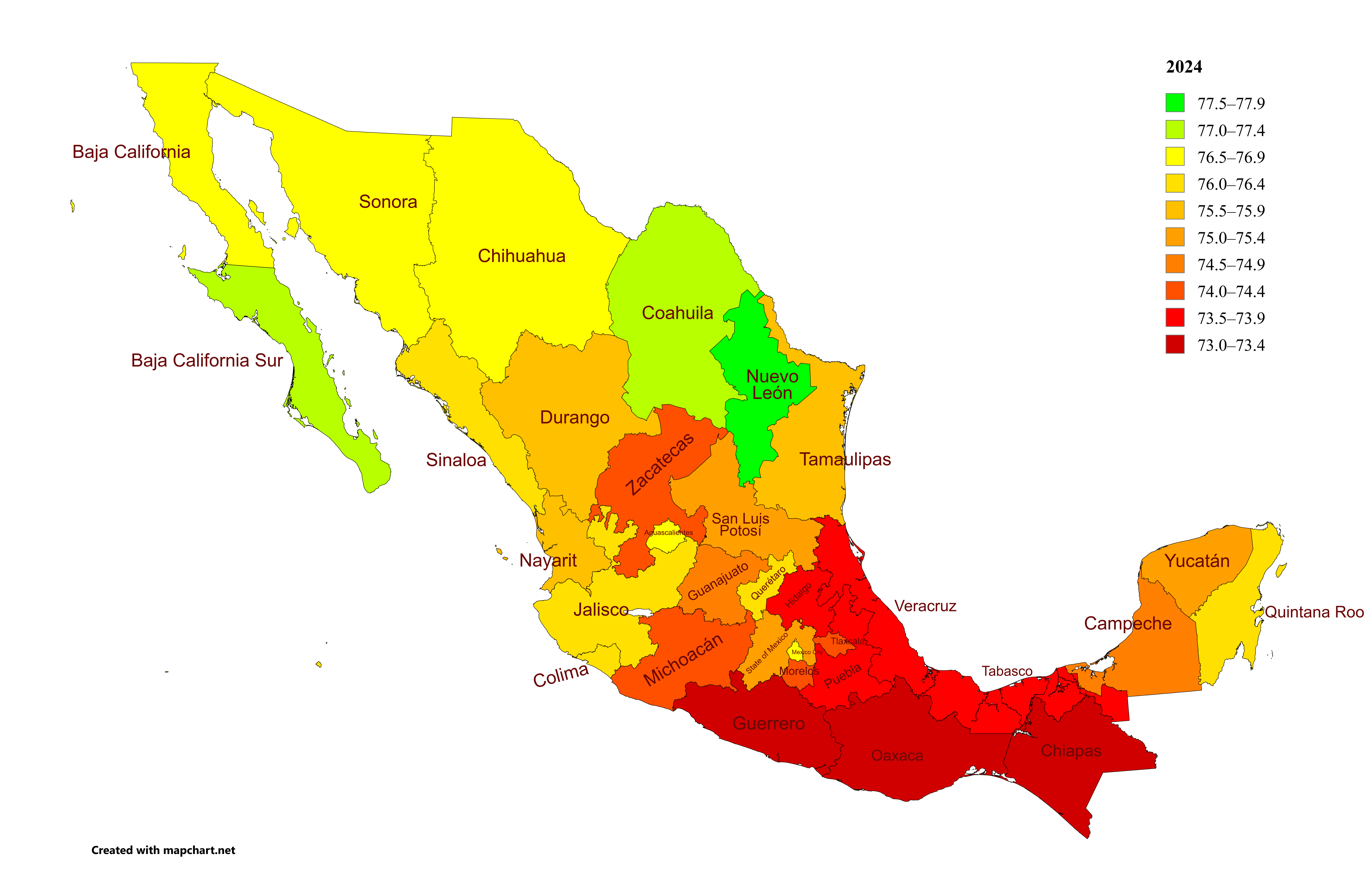
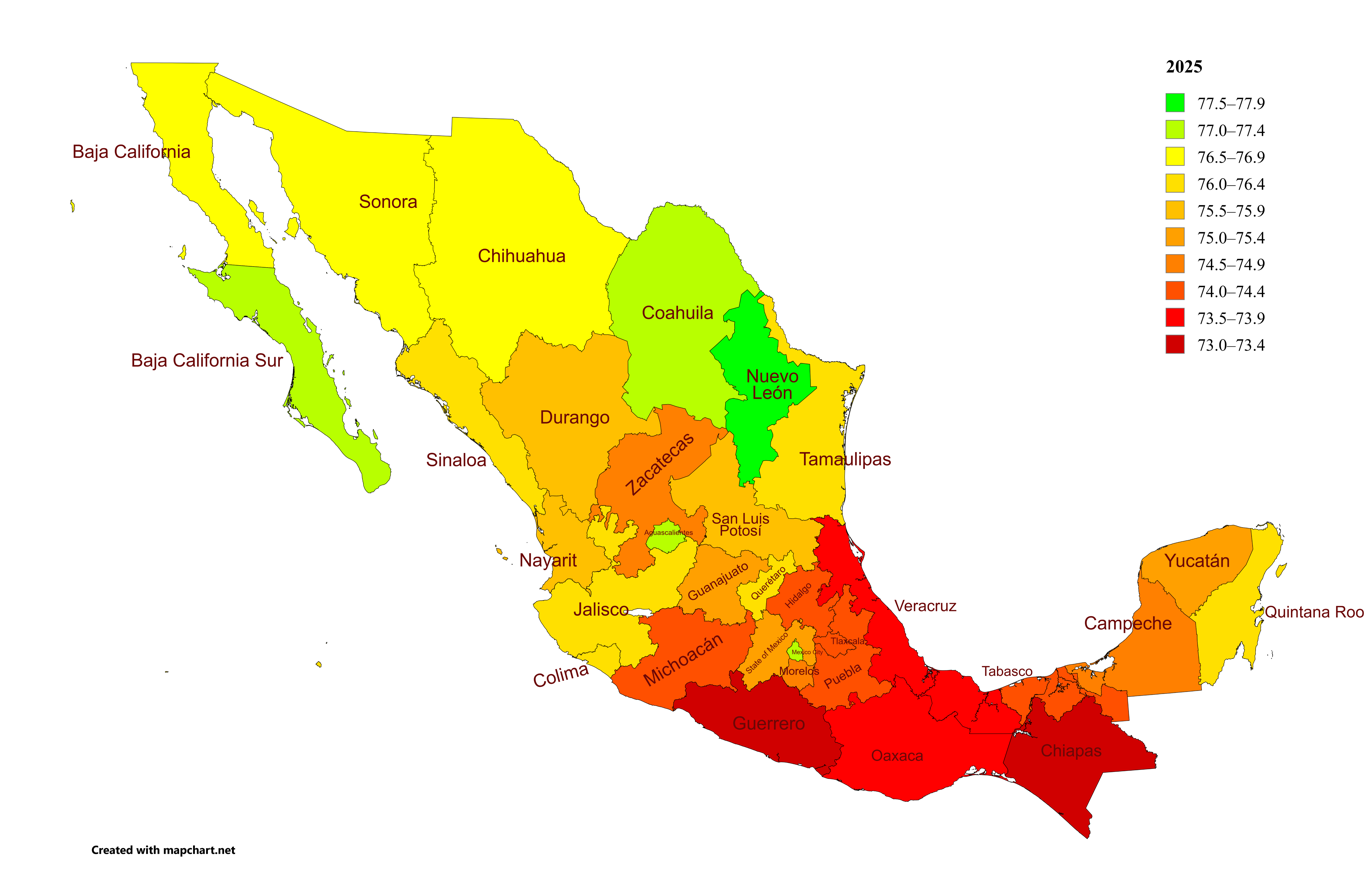
Maps of Mexican states by life expectancy for 2013, 2019, 2024, and 2025

Data source: INEGI

== Global Data Lab (2019–2022) ==
region	2019				2019 →2021	2021	2021 →2022	2022				2019 →2022
region	overall	male	female	F Δ M	2019 →2021	overall	2021 →2022	overall	male	female	F Δ M	2019 →2022
Mexico on average	74.20	70.93	77.57	6.64	−3.99	70.21	4.62	74.83	71.55	78.16	6.61	0.63
Baja California	76.07	72.61	79.85	7.24	−4.09	71.98	4.74	76.72	73.24	80.46	7.22	0.65
Aguascalientes	76.02	72.56	79.79	7.23	−4.09	71.93	4.73	76.66	73.19	80.39	7.20	0.64
Sinaloa	75.84	72.39	79.58	7.19	−4.08	71.76	4.72	76.48	73.02	80.18	7.16	0.64
Tabasco	75.71	72.28	79.42	7.14	−4.07	71.64	4.71	76.35	72.91	80.03	7.12	0.64
Campeche	75.67	72.24	79.38	7.14	−4.07	71.60	4.71	76.31	72.87	79.98	7.11	0.64
Colima	75.54	72.13	79.23	7.10	−4.06	71.48	4.71	76.19	72.75	79.83	7.08	0.65
Tamaulipas	75.29	71.89	78.92	7.03	−4.05	71.24	4.68	75.92	72.51	79.52	7.01	0.63
Morelos	75.13	71.75	78.74	6.99	−4.04	71.09	4.68	75.77	72.37	79.33	6.96	0.64
Tlaxcala	74.96	71.59	78.53	6.94	−4.03	70.93	4.66	75.59	72.21	79.13	6.92	0.63
Nuevo León	74.81	71.45	78.36	6.91	−4.02	70.79	4.66	75.45	72.07	78.95	6.88	0.64
Yucatán	74.79	71.44	78.34	6.90	−4.02	70.77	4.66	75.43	72.06	78.93	6.87	0.64
Coahuila	74.79	71.43	78.33	6.90	−4.02	70.77	4.65	75.42	72.05	78.92	6.87	0.63
Querétaro	74.75	71.40	78.29	6.89	−4.02	70.73	4.66	75.39	72.02	78.88	6.86	0.64
San Luis Potosí	74.67	71.32	78.19	6.87	−4.02	70.65	4.65	75.30	71.94	78.78	6.84	0.63
Baja California Sur	74.61	71.27	78.12	6.85	−4.01	70.60	4.64	75.24	71.89	78.71	6.82	0.63
Mexico City	74.59	71.25	78.09	6.84	−4.01	70.58	4.64	75.22	71.87	78.69	6.82	0.63
Jalisco	74.54	71.21	78.04	6.83	−4.00	70.54	4.64	75.18	71.83	78.63	6.80	0.64
Guanajuato	74.30	70.99	77.76	6.77	−3.99	70.31	4.63	74.94	71.60	78.35	6.75	0.64
Michoacán	74.26	70.94	77.70	6.76	−3.99	70.27	4.62	74.89	71.56	78.29	6.73	0.63
Sonora	74.25	70.93	77.69	6.76	−3.99	70.26	4.62	74.88	71.55	78.28	6.73	0.63
Quintana Roo	74.22	70.91	77.66	6.75	−3.99	70.23	4.62	74.85	71.52	78.25	6.73	0.63
Veracruz	74.15	70.84	77.57	6.73	−3.99	70.16	4.62	74.78	71.46	78.16	6.70	0.63
Zacatecas	74.09	70.79	77.50	6.71	−3.98	70.11	4.61	74.72	71.40	78.09	6.69	0.63
Hidalgo	74.01	70.71	77.41	6.70	−3.98	70.03	4.61	74.64	71.33	77.99	6.66	0.63
Mexico (state)	73.88	70.59	77.25	6.66	−3.97	69.91	4.59	74.50	71.21	77.84	6.63	0.62
Oaxaca	73.72	70.45	77.07	6.62	−3.96	69.76	4.59	74.35	71.06	77.65	6.59	0.63
Durango	73.51	70.25	76.81	6.56	−3.95	69.56	4.57	74.13	70.86	77.40	6.54	0.62
Chiapas	73.24	70.00	76.50	6.50	−3.93	69.31	4.55	73.86	70.61	77.08	6.47	0.62
Puebla	73.14	69.91	76.37	6.46	−3.93	69.21	4.55	73.76	70.51	76.95	6.44	0.62
Nayarit	72.93	69.71	76.12	6.41	−3.92	69.01	4.54	73.55	70.32	76.70	6.38	0.62
Chihuahua	72.52	69.33	75.63	6.30	−3.90	68.62	4.51	73.13	69.93	76.20	6.27	0.61
Guerrero	72.22	69.06	75.28	6.22	−3.88	68.34	4.50	72.84	69.66	75.85	6.19	0.62

Data source: Global Data Lab

== 2017 and 2010 ==
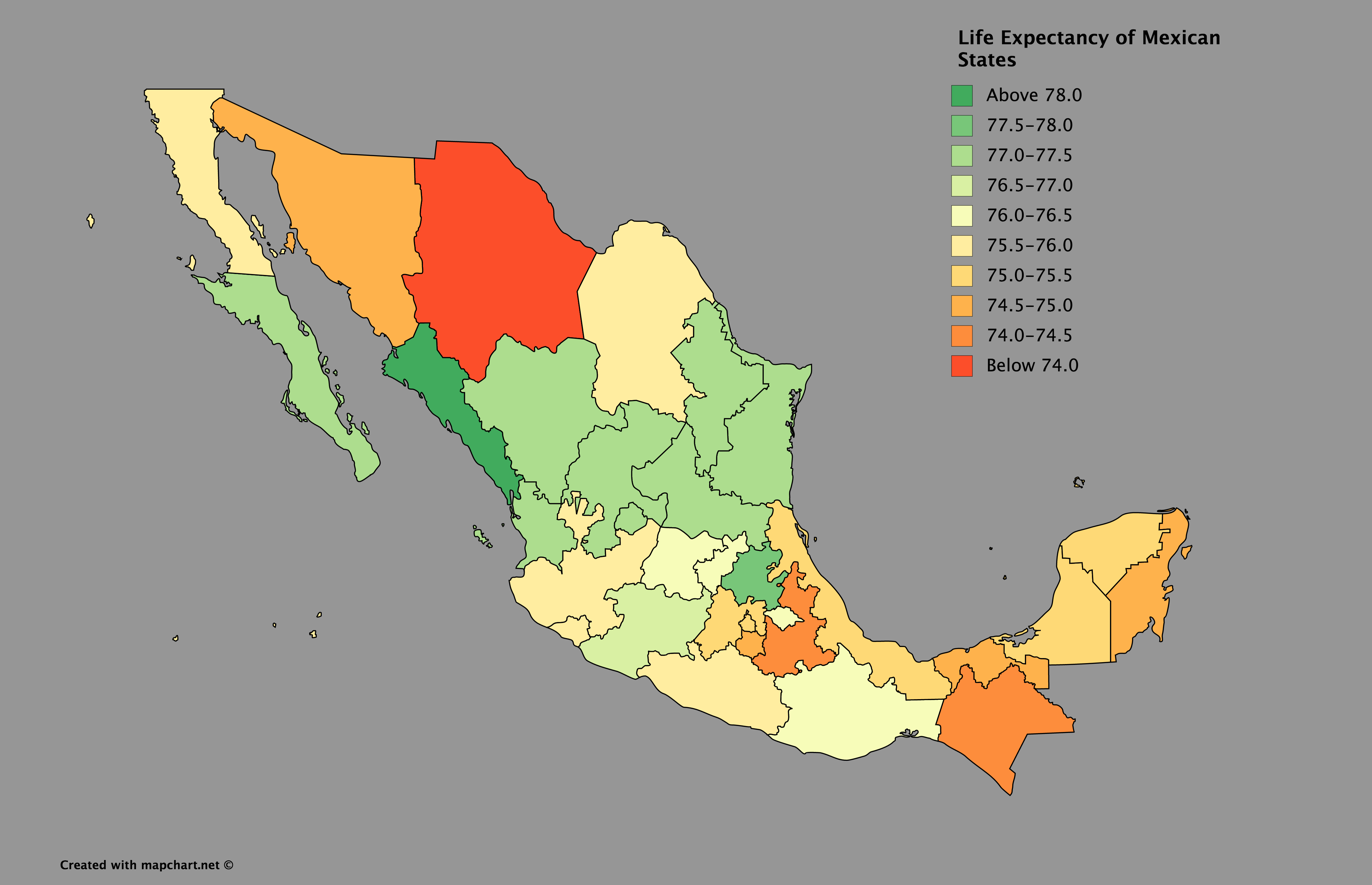
Life Expectancy in Mexico by state in 2017

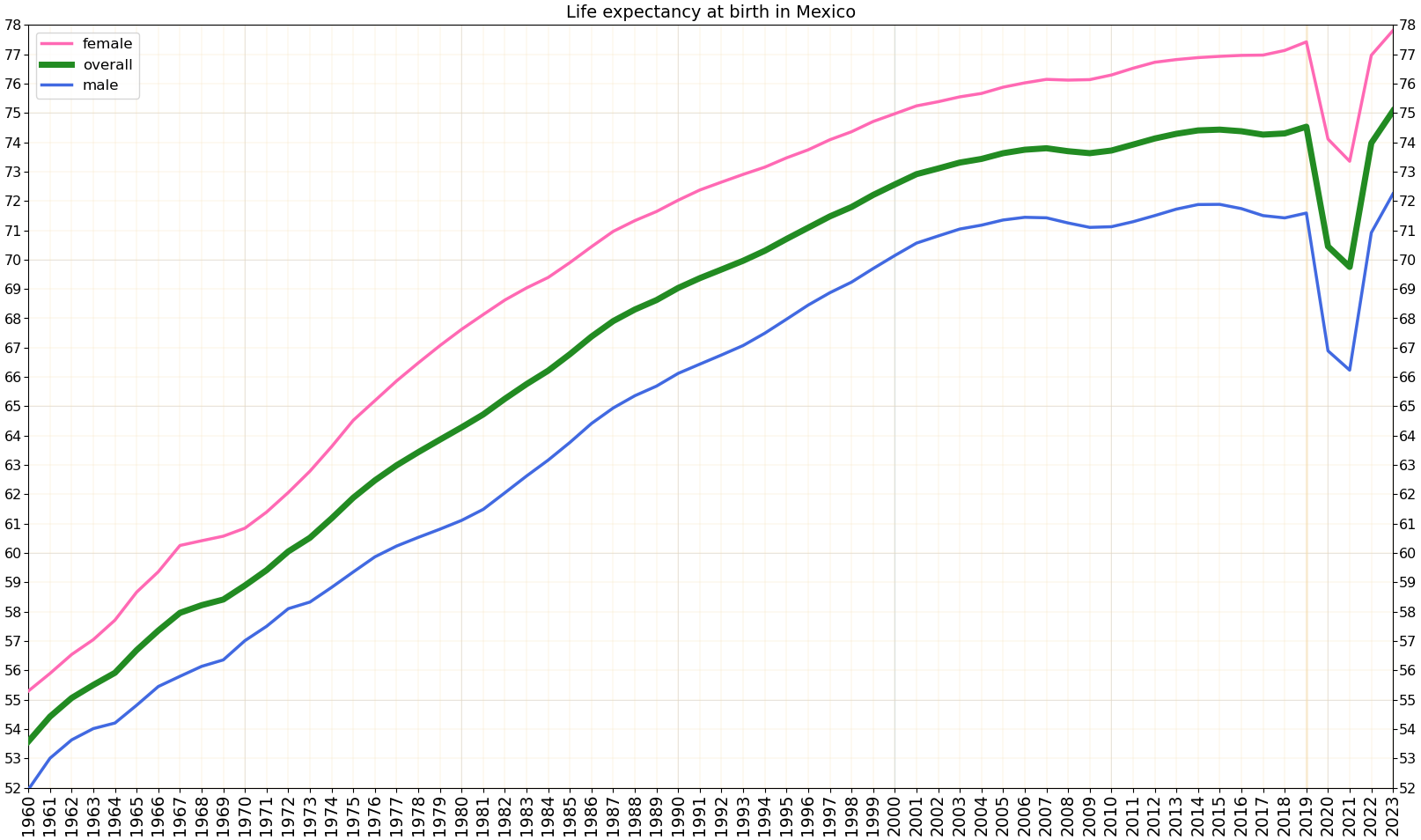
Development of life expectancy in Mexico according to estimation of the World Bank Group

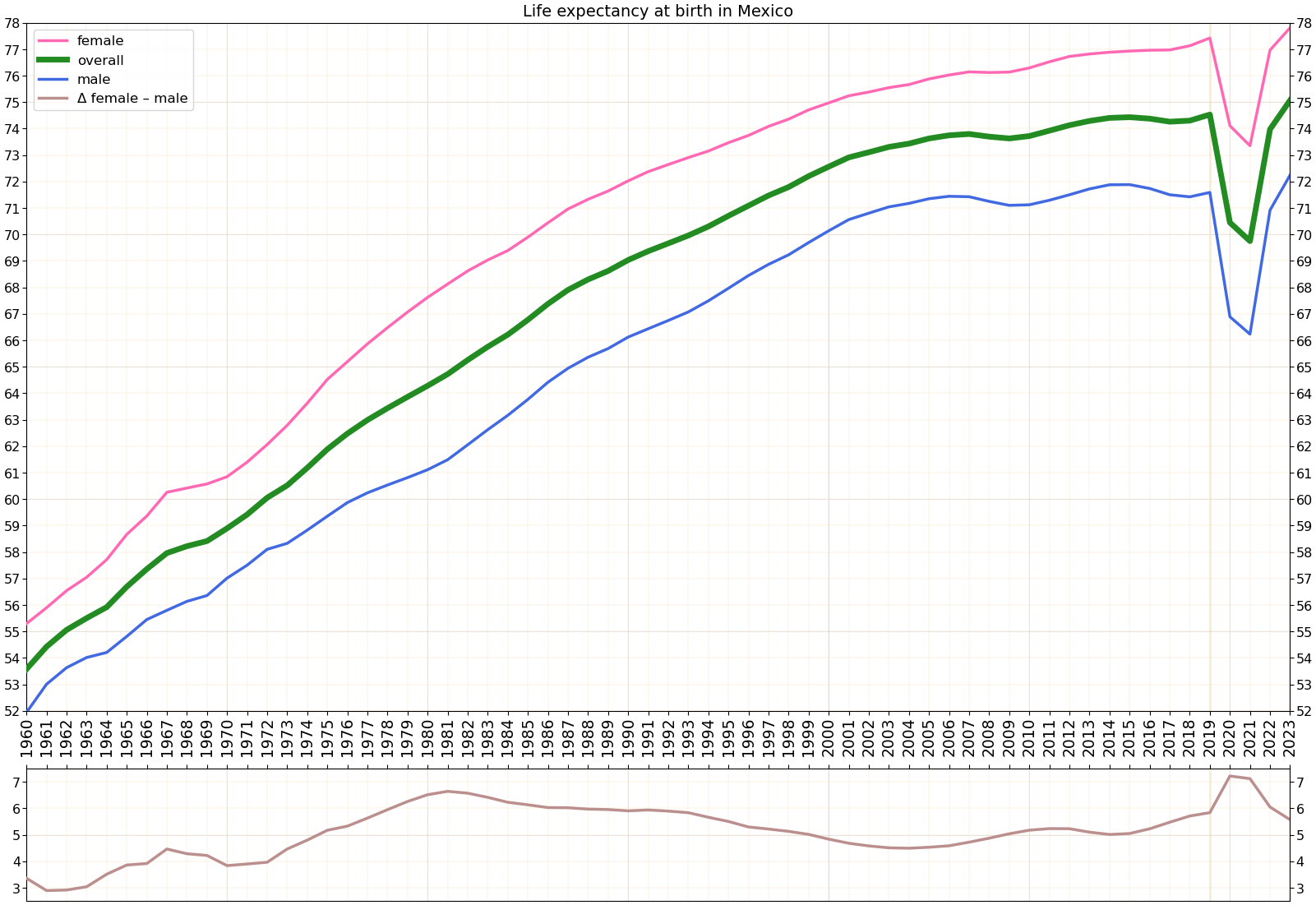
Life expectancy with calculated gender gap

Life expectancy in Mexico according to estimation of the Our World in Data

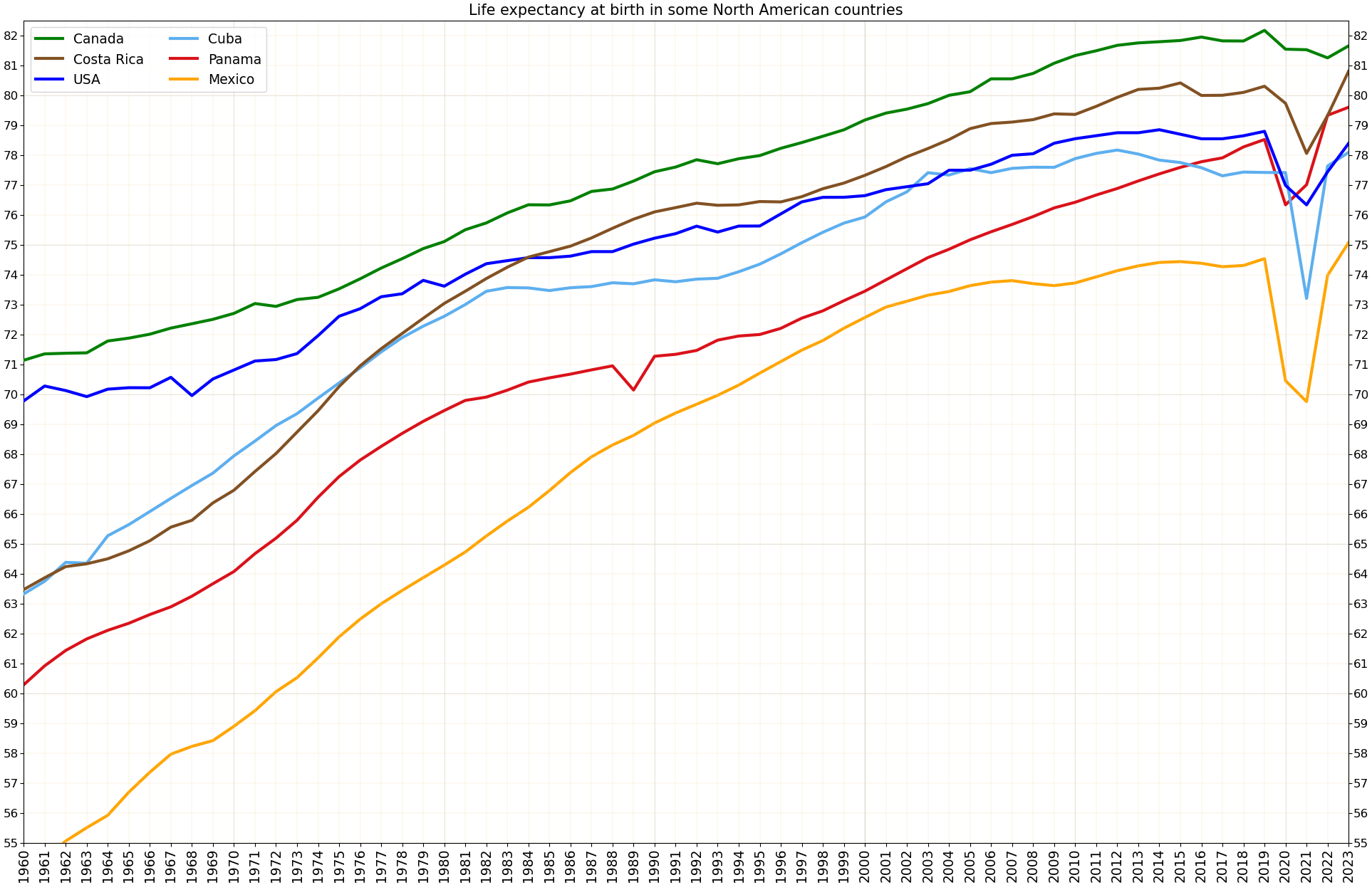
Development of life expectancy in Mexico in comparison to other big countries of North America

Life expectancy and healthy life expectancy in Mexico on the background of other countries of the world in 2019

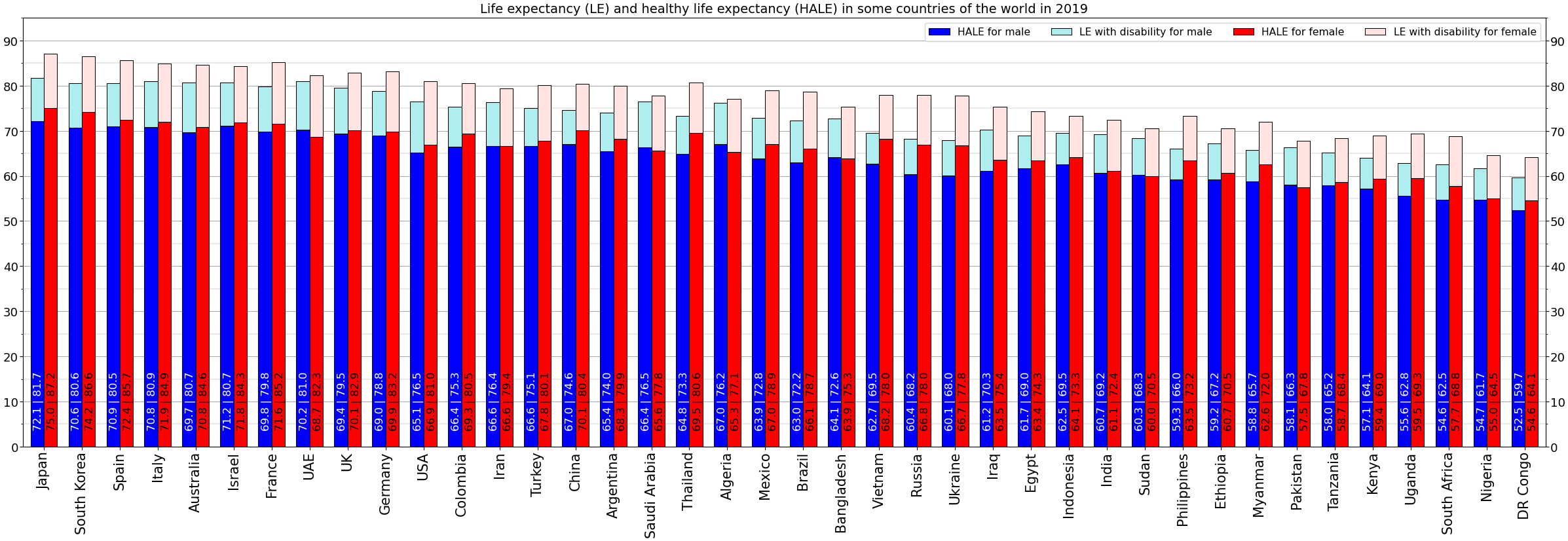
Life expectancy and healthy life expectancy for males and females

Rank	State	Life Expectancy in 2017	Life Expectancy in 2010	Change 2010-2017	Males	Females
3.	Aguascalientes	77.31	76.18	▲1.13	74.86	79.70
21.	Baja California	75.17	73.51	▲1.66	71.67	79.07
9.	Baja California Sur	76.81	75.72	▲1.09	74.12	79.87
23.	Campeche	75.07	76.30	▼1.23	72.71	77.49
30.	Chiapas	74.28	74.24	▲0.04	72.28	76.23
32.	Chihuahua	73.11	68.58	▲4.53	70.11	76.27
16.	Coahuila	75.52	74.59	▲1.03	73.37	77.73
19.	Colima	75.37	75.55	▼0.18	72.33	78.59
7.	Durango	76.92	73.50	▲3.42	74.33	79.59
14.	Guanajuato	76.21	76.48	▼0.27	73.30	79.05
17.	Guerrero	75.44	75.04	▲0.40	71.12	79.86
2.	Hidalgo	77.43	76.71	▲0.72	74.59	80.22
18.	Jalisco	75.40	75.63	▼0.23	72.54	78.29
-	Mexico	75.52	75.23	▲0.29	72.26	78.50
20.	Mexico City	75.20	75.64	▼0.44	71.52	78.74
22.	México (state)	75.14	75.54	▼0.40	72.12	78.14
10.	Michoacán	76.62	75.76	▲0.86	73.35	79.87
26.	Morelos	74.78	76.12	▼1.34	71.51	77.99
5.	Nayarit	77.16	75.99	▲1.17	74.38	80.14
4.	Nuevo León	77.17	75.86	▲1.31	74.95	79.76
15.	Oaxaca	75.92	75.80	▲0.12	72.92	78.75
31.	Puebla	74.13	74.87	▼0.74	71.05	77.06
13.	Querétaro	76.25	76.34	▼0.09	73.29	79.18
28.	Quintana Roo	74.46	75.44	▼0.98	72.25	76.88
6.	San Luis Potosí	77.09	76.58	▲0.51	74.41	79.76
1.	Sinaloa	78.27	75.04	▲3.23	75.18	81.53
27.	Sonora	74.69	74.10	▲0.59	71.51	78.18
29.	Tabasco	74.43	74.81	▼0.38	71.50	77.42
11.	Tamaulipas	76.56	75.25	▲1.31	73.67	79.52
12.	Tlaxcala	76.32	76.56	▼0.24	73.72	78.82
25.	Veracruz	75.02	75.40	▼0.38	72.25	77.73
24.	Yucatán	75.06	75.77	▼0.71	72.73	77.41
8.	Zacatecas	76.88	76.52	▲0.36	74.34	79.45

== Past Life Expectancy ==
State	2017	2010	2000	1990	Change 1990-2017
Mexico	75.52	75.23	74.59	71.40	▲4.12
Aguascalientes	77.31	76.18	75.30	72.82	▲4.49
Baja California	75.17	73.51	71.40	70.04	▲5.13
Baja California Sur	76.81	75.72	75.17	73.68	▲3.13
Campeche	75.07	76.30	75.86	72.27	▲2.80
Chiapas	74.28	74.24	73.06	70.17	▲4.11
Chihuahua	73.11	68.58	71.79	69.21	▲3.90
Coahuila	75.52	74.49	74.08	71.40	▲4.12
Colima	75.37	75.55	74.96	70.66	▲4.71
Durango	76.92	73.50	75.83	71.69	▲5.23
Guanajuato	76.21	76.48	75.05	71.74	▲4.47
Guerrero	75.44	75.04	76.08	72.44	▲3.00
Hidalgo	77.43	76.71	76.22	71.71	▲5.72
Jalisco	75.40	75.63	74.45	71.49	▲3.51
Mexico City	75.20	75.64	74.89	72.53	▲2.67
México (state)	75.14	75.54	74.04	70.29	▲4.85
Michoacán	76.62	75.76	75.34	72.41	▲4.21
Morelos	74.78	76.12	75.75	72.19	▲2.59
Nayarit	77.16	75.99	76.56	72.15	▲5.01
Nuevo León	77.17	75.86	75.54	73.12	▲4.05
Oaxaca	75.92	75.80	74.47	69.39	▲6.53
Puebla	74.13	74.87	73.37	69.43	▲4.70
Querétaro	76.25	76.34	74.40	71.36	▲4.89
Quintana Roo	74.46	75.44	75.41	73.42	▲1.04
San Luis Potosí	77.09	76.58	76.23	72.92	▲4.17
Sinaloa	78.27	75.04	76.06	73.24	▲5.03
Sonora	74.69	74.10	73.57	71.23	▲3.46
Tabasco	74.43	74.81	74.87	71.86	▲2.57
Tamaulipas	76.56	75.25	75.40	72.69	▲3.87
Tlaxcala	76.32	76.56	75.47	72.09	▲4.23
Veracruz	75.02	75.40	74.74	71.49	▲3.53
Yucatán	75.06	75.77	75.22	72.29	▲2.77
Zacatecas	76.88	76.52	76.40	73.78	▲3.10

== See also ==
- List of North American countries by life expectancy
- Demographics of Mexico
