= David Reay =

Climate change scientist, author and professor at University of Edinburgh

David Reay FRSGS
- Born: David S. Reay
- Education: University of Essex (PhD)
- Scientific career
- Fields: Climate change Nitrogen; Methane; Climate education Net zero
- Institutions: University of Edinburgh
- Thesis: Temperature dependence of inorganic nitrogen utilisation by bacteria and microalgae (1999)
- Doctoral students: Hannah Ritchie
- Website: blogs.ed.ac.uk/davereay/

David S. Reay FRSGS is a climate change scientist, author, and professor of carbon management and education at the University of Edinburgh. He serves as co-chair of the Just Transition Commission, and served as executive director of the Edinburgh Climate Change Institute and policy director of ClimateXChange between January 2020 and January 2024.

== Education ==
Reay was educated at the University of Essex where he was awarded a PhD in 1999 for research on the utilisation of inorganic nitrogen by bacteria and microalgae.

== Research and career ==
Reay's research focuses on greenhouse gas fluxes and land use, including national and international research projects such as CarboEurope and NitroEurope, and research council-funded work through the UK's Natural Environment Research Council (NERC). Reay's key peer reviewed publications include novel work on global carbon sinks, the soil methane sink, and nitrous oxide emissions from aquatic systems. His work on nitrous oxide featured in the Intergovernmental Panel on Climate Change (IPCC) Fourth and Fifth Assessment Reports. In addition to his contributions to the understanding of greenhouse gas fluxes, Reay has written widely on climate change policy and society, particularly on individual and community action. He now advises the Scottish and UK Governments on climate action, especially around climate change skills and green jobs

=== Climate change ===
Reay has authored several books on climate change, including the popular science books Climate-smart Food, Nitrogen and Climate Change, Climate Change Begins at Home published in 2005 by Macmillan and shortlisted for the Times Higher Young Academic Author of the Year Award, and Your Planet Needs You! published in 2009 by Macmillan Children's Books. He is also lead editor of Greenhouse Gas Sinks published in 2007 by CABI and creator and editor of the climate change science website Greenhouse Gas Online.

=== Service and leadership ===
Reay chaired the Scottish Government's Climate Emergency Skills Implementation Group and the UK Climate Change Committee's Expert Advisory Panel on Workforce & Skills. He was also a member of the UK Government's Green Jobs Taskforce and was the creator of the award-winning Master of Science (MSc) course in carbon management at the University of Edinburgh.

He is very active in climate change knowledge exchange, both nationally and internationally, being a regular media commentator on climate change issues, advising on and appearing in the BBC's Can We Save Planet Earth Are We Changing Planet Earth? film with David Attenborough, and frequently providing expert evidence on climate change to select committees in the Westminster and Holyrood Parliaments. Knowledge exchange information, University of Edinburgh. His former doctoral students include Hannah Ritchie.
