= Oxford Martin School =

Research and policy institution

Coordinates: 51.7549°N 1.2542°W

- Oxford Martin School logo
- Formation: 2005
- Headquarters: Broad Street, Oxford, England
- Location: Oxford, England
- Director: Professor Sir Charles Godfray
- Parent organization: University of Oxford
- Website: www.oxfordmartin.ox.ac.uk

The Oxford Martin School is a research and policy unit at the Social Sciences Division of the University of Oxford in Oxford, England, United Kingdom.

It was founded in June 2005 as the James Martin 21st Century School and is located in the original building of the Indian Institute. It is named after its benefactor, James Martin, author of the books The Wired Society and The Meaning of the 21st Century. Its director is Charles Godfray, who took up the post in February 2018.

'Finding solutions to the world's most urgent problems' is the stated mission of the Oxford Martin School.

== History ==
The Oxford Martin School was founded in 2005 after author James Martin donated over £70 million, (Note: The Times reported that the donation was £74 million. The Guardian reports that it was £72.5 million. The Oxford Student and Cherwell report the donation was £100 million.) the largest benefaction to the University of Oxford in its more than 900-year history. The founding director of the School was Ian Goldin who held the post from September 2006 to September 2016.

The School and the Faculty of Philosophy of the University of Oxford founded the Future of Humanity Institute in 2005. In 2010, the School announced the successful outcome of a $100 million matched funding scheme that saw the number of research programmes in the School more than double.

== Research ==
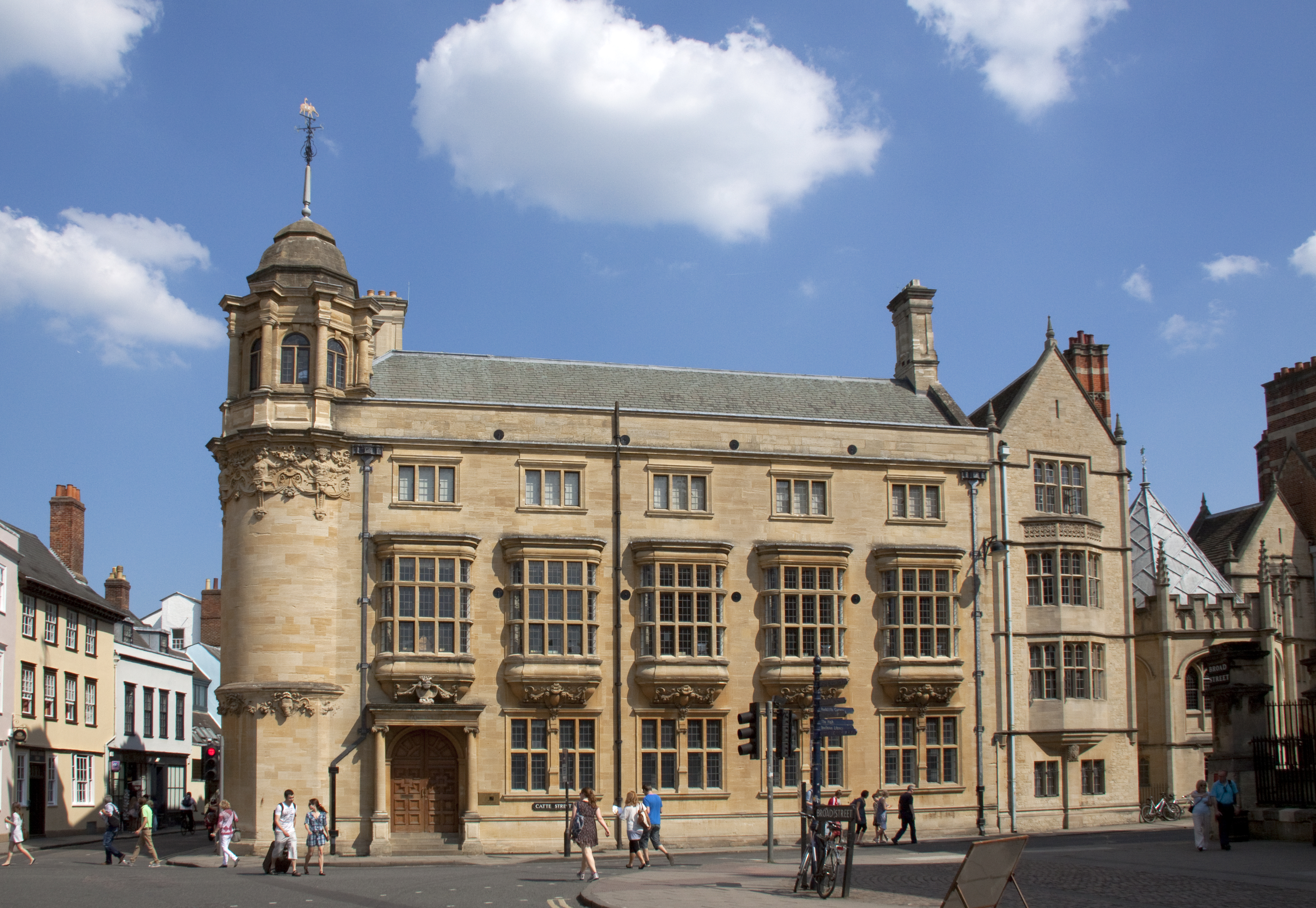
The Oxford Martin School is housed in the former Indian Institute building on Broad Street, Oxford.

The School invests in research tackling "the most pressing global challenges and opportunities of the 21st century". It takes a multi-disciplinary approach to issues such as climate change, migration, and the future of humanity.

In September 2012, the School launched the Oxford Martin Commission for Future Generations, an interdisciplinary group looking at global issues such as cybersecurity, climate change, and political transparency. The Commission, chaired by Pascal Lamy, reported in 2013, making fifteen proposals on how to respond to these trends. These included some expansions of existing projects and some new proposals.

A report published in 2013 looked at the effect of new technologies on the structure of the labour market, with repetitive jobs being replaced by automation. It predicted that over two decades, 45 percent of all jobs in the United States were at risk of replacement. A report published in early 2016, "Industrial Renewal in the 21st Century: Evidence from US cities", looked at how technology companies such as Facebook and Uber affect the wider economy of the United States. It showed that their effect on job creation is small and that they increase disparities in wealth.

Two Oxford Martin School research directors were listed among Prospect Magazine's World's Top Thinkers: philosopher Nick Bostrom was listed 15th in 2014 and global development researcher Max Roser was listed 2nd in 2019.

The School is home to the 'Oxford Martin Programme on the Illegal Wildlife Trade' which aims to change demand for illegal wildlife products.

In 2021, research from Marco Springmann, a senior researcher at the programme on the Future of Food, was published in The Lancet which used data from the World Bank International Comparison Programme to assess the cost of dietary patterns in 150 countries and found a vegan dietary pattern to be the most affordable. United States journalist Avery Yale Kamila said "the Oxford University study adds high-quality, much-needed data to policy discussions about food costs." Food Navigator journalist Oliver Morrison said "The findings fly in the face of consumer surveys consistently suggesting that most consumers care about sustainability but say they are often unable or unwilling to pay more for 'greener' food and beverage alternatives."

== Our World in Data ==
The flagship publication for the School's research is Our World in Data, which is published jointly with the Global Change Data Lab. The publication's mission – 'Research and data to make progress against the world's largest problems' – is closely aligned with the School's mission. The publication's research team is based at the School. Our World in Data is the largest scientific open-access publication based at a university worldwide and widely used in policy institutions.
