= Charles Godfray =

British zoologist

Sir Hugh Charles Jonathan Godfray CBE FRS (born 27 October 1958) is a British zoologist. He is Professor of Population Biology at Balliol College, Oxford, Director of the Oxford Martin School and Director Oxford Martin Programme on the Future of Food.

== Life ==
Educated at Millfield and St Peter's College, Oxford, he gained his PhD in community ecology from Imperial College, London in 1983. He remained at Imperial as a post-doc until 1985, when he returned to Oxford as a demonstrator. In 1987 he returned to Imperial as a lecturer at Silwood Park until 2006, when he again returned to Oxford, now as a fellow of Jesus College and Hope Professor of Zoology.

He was awarded the Scientific Medal in 1994, and Frink Medal in 2009 of the Zoological Society of London. He was elected Fellow of the Royal Society in 2001. He was appointed Commander of the Order of the British Empire (CBE) in the 2011 New Year Honours. and was knighted in the 2017 Birthday Honours for services to scientific research and scientific advice to government.

His most cited research article, published in Science, studies how to meet the challenge of feeding a growing global population. To date his research has been cited more than 40,000 times. Godfray also serves on the editorial board of Pathogens and Global Health.

Studying the malaria problem Godfray and his coworkers presented data suggesting that use of spermless mosquitoes may be a feasible way to control the disease.

Since February 2018 he is the director of the Oxford Martin School and Professor of Population Biology at University of Oxford.

In 2021 he was elected to the American Philosophical Society.
