= Hetan Shah =

British academic administrator

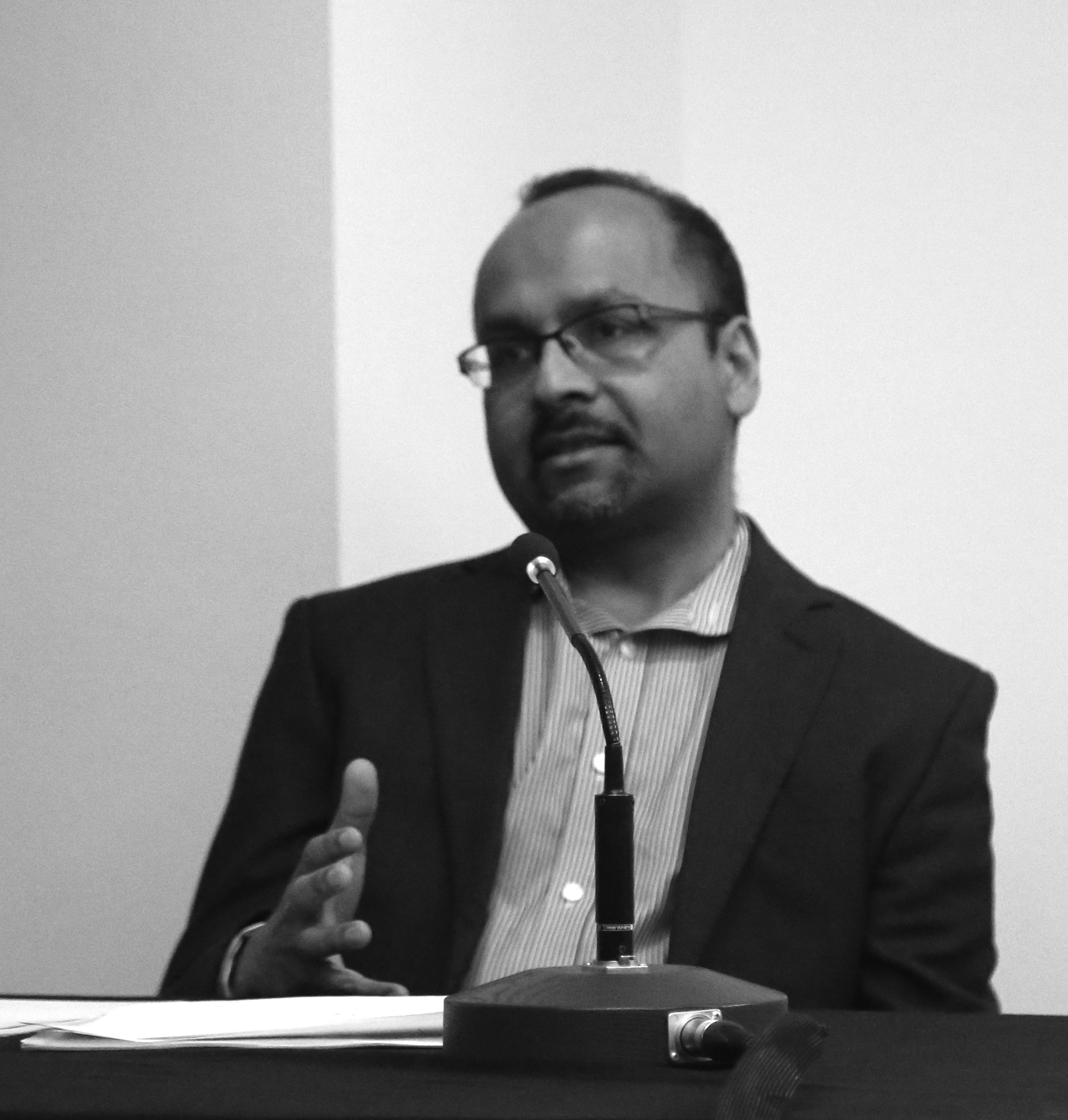
- Shah at a Datum Future panel in London in 2018
- Education: University of Oxford; Birkbeck, University of London; Nottingham Law School
- Employer(s): British Academy; Royal Statistical Society; King's College London

Hetan Shah is the chief executive of the British Academy and the chair of Our World in Data. In 2024 he was appointed by the UK Parliament to the Board of the National Audit Office, the UK's spending watchdog. He is a visiting professor at King's College London and a Fellow of Birkbeck, University of London. He is Visiting Professor in Practice at the LSE's Data Science Institute. He served as executive director of the Royal Statistical Society from 2011 to 2019.

== Early life and education ==
Shah studied philosophy, politics and economics at the University of Oxford and graduated in 1996. He earned a postgraduate diploma at Nottingham Law School and a master's degree in history and politics at Birkbeck, University of London. He earned a further postgraduate certificate in economics at Birkbeck, University of London in 2003.

== Career ==
Shah is Chief Executive of the British Academy, the UK's national academy for humanities and social sciences. He began this role in February 2020. In March 2021, on the anniversary of the first lockdown, the Academy published a review of the long term societal consequences of the pandemic.

During his tenure, the Academy has explored a wide range of policy matters including artificial intelligence, climate change, public service media, economic strategy, and higher education policy.

Under his tenure, the British Academy has set up a nationwide Early Career Researcher Network with regional hubs to support early career researchers. It has set up a scheme in partnership with Cara and other Academies to support Researchers at Risk. Funding enabled the scheme to support over 170 researchers from Ukraine to come to the UK and continue their research. During his time the Academy has also innovated with its funding schemes, using partial randomisation to award its smallest grants, creating new schemes such as Innovation Fellowships and Talent Development Awards, and an Additional Needs Fund to support inclusion.

In evidence to the Public Administration and Constitutional Affairs Select Committee Shah called for government to improve the transparency of evidence underlying policy decisions, and called for greater researcher access to government data for research purposes.

In February 2025 Hetan gave the Health Foundation's annual REAL lecture on the topic of artificial intelligence and health. The lecture is summarised in a blog and available to watch. In October 2025 Shah also gave the Chancellor's Lecture at York St John University on the theme of 'Why does nothing work, and what can we do about it?'. , In November 2025 he gave the inaugural Vice Chancellor's Distinguished Lecture at De Montfort University exploring the importance of humanities and social sciences for public policy.

Shah served as executive director of the Royal Statistical Society from 2011 to 2019. Under his leadership the society developed several new initiatives, including the celebration of Statistics of the Year, the Data Manifesto and the development of Statistical Ambassadors. The 10-point data manifesto was published after the 2015 election, intended to communicate the significance of certain statistics with politicians and the general public. The manifesto emphasised the need to use reliable evidence in public debate. Statistical Ambassadors act to support charities and the media, pairing them with statisticians trained in public engagement. He also created a Statisticians for Society scheme which encouraged statisticians and data scientists to volunteer for charities.

Shah called for the Public Administration and Constitutional Affairs Select Committee to stop having evidence sessions that consistently feature all male panels. In 2018 he worked with the Institute and Faculty of Actuaries to investigate the implications of big data. Shah has argued that without trustworthy governance systems the public may become mistrustful of commercial use of their data in the same way they queried genetically modified food.

== Non executive roles ==
He is Chair of the Our World in Data website which provides long run datasets on global issues. In 2024 he was appointed by the UK Parliament to the Board of the National Audit Office, the UK's spending watchdog. Shah serves on a number of advisory boards including for the Resolution Foundation and UCL's Public Policy Lab.

Shah helped to found and went on to serve as Vice Chair of the Ada Lovelace Institute between 2018 and 2022. The Ada Lovelace Institute is a research body that looks to ensure all data and artificial intelligence serves to benefit all members of society. The think-tank was established after a Royal Statistical Society workshop on big data, when participants questioned what ethics and governance organisations could use. The Ada Lovelace Institute support both the public and private sector, and is independent of government or corporate interests.

He served as Chair of the Friends Provident Foundation, a grant-making foundation from 2016-2020. The Friends Provident Foundation is a grant making trust that seeks to promote a more fair and resilient economy.

He is a visiting professor at King's College London and Visiting Professor in Practice at the LSE Data Science Institute. He was a member of the IPPR Commission on Economic Justice. He is also a member of the independent Social Metrics Commission which recommended a new way of measuring poverty in the UK. He has served on a number of other boards including as a trustee of St George's House (Windsor Castle), a trustee of the Legal Education Foundation, the advisory board for the Bennett Institute for Public Policy at Cambridge University, the Science Media Centre's advisory board, the Office for National Statistics Data Science Campus advisory board, and the management board of the Sir Lenny Henry Centre for Media Diversity. Shah was conferred an honorary degree by York St John University in 2023.

== Media ==
Shah is regularly quoted in the press. He has written on a range of subjects including:

- Innovation (FT)

- Productivity (Guardian)

- AI in Society (Evening Standard)

- UK R&D and risk funding (CityAM)

- Importance of humanities and social sciences (Nature)

- AI in public policy (FT)

- Measuring poverty (CityAM)

- Artificial intelligence in the world of work (CIPD)

- Statistics (FT)

- Higher Education (THE)

- Humanities in the age of AI (FT)

- The British Library (CityAM)

- Artificial intelligence in public services (New Statesman)
