= Julia Black =

Professor of law and former Director of the London School of Economics (born 1967)

Dame Julia Black DBE FBA

Strategic Director for Innovation, London School of Economics and Political Science
- In office 2017

Personal details
- Born: 29 January 1967 (age 59)
- Education: Lincoln College, Oxford (BA, DPhil)
- Awards: Honorary Fellow of Lincoln College, Oxford

Academic work
- Discipline: Law

Dame Julia Mary Black DBE FBA (born 29 January 1967) is the strategic director of innovation and a professor of law at the London School of Economics and Political Science (LSE). She was the interim director of the LSE, a post she held from September 2016 until September 2017, at which time Minouche Shafik took over the directorship. She is the president of the British Academy, the UK's national academy for the humanities and social sciences, and became the academy's second female president in July 2021 for a four-year term. In September 2024, she became the tenth Warden of Nuffield College, Oxford.

== Early life and education ==
Black was born on 29 January 1967 in Waterloo, Lancashire, England. She graduated with a first-class undergraduate degree in jurisprudence from the University of Oxford in 1988. In 1994, she completed her DPhil at Lincoln College, Oxford, with a thesis on Conduct of Business Rules in the financial sector. Her primary research interests are regulation of the financial services sector and financial risk.

== Career ==
Black is strategic director of innovation, professor of law at the London School of Economics and Political Science and the general editor of the Modern Law Review. She was the LSE's pro director for research from 2014 to 2019 and interim director of the LSE from 2016 to 2017. She is also a research associate of the LSE's Centre for the Analysis of Risk and Regulation (CARR) and has been actively involved with developing the LSE’s research collaborations with STEM disciplines, particularly around health and data science. She has been a Fellow of the British Academy since 2015 and the president-elect since 2020. She became only the second female president in the academy’s 118-year history, after taking up the role in July 2021 for a four-year term and becoming the 31st president, when she succeeded the historian Professor Sir David Cannadine.

Previously, she was a lecturer and tutor at the University of Oxford, the recipient of a British Academy / Leverhulme Trust Senior Research Fellowship, and a visiting fellow at the University of Sydney and at All Souls College, Oxford. In 2014, she was the Sir Frank Holmes Visiting Professor in Public Policy at the University of Victoria, Wellington. She has also received grants from the Economic and Social Research Council (ESRC) and the Social Science Research Council (SSRC) and was the recipient of the 2016 Standing Group Award for Regulatory Studies Development. She has written extensively on regulatory issues in a number of areas, including financial regulation and was a part of a high-level steering group of experts working on a review of the Research Excellence Framework (REF) chaired by former president of the British Academy and World Bank Chief Economist, Lord Nicholas Stern. The independent review, which was published in 2016, was designed to make recommendations on how the REF worked in future. In the same year, she was also a member of the British Academy’s working group on interdisciplinary research, which examined how interdisciplinary research is carried out, the demand for it and whether the right structures are in place to support interdisciplinarity across the research and higher education system.

Outside of academia, Black has had a number of non-executive and advisory roles for many organisations, including the Organisation for Economic Co-operation and Development (OECD), the UK National Audit Office, the Solicitors Regulation Authority (SRA), the Financial Services Authority, and the Law Commission. At the SRA, she was an independent board member from 2014 to 2018 and chaired its policy committee. Currently, she is an external member of the Prudential Regulation Committee and an external member of the SONIA oversight committee at the Bank of England, with the term of her appointment running from November 2018 to November 2021. She has been a senior independent member of UK Research and Innovation (UKRI), which is responsible for research and innovation funding in the UK, since 2017 and is also a member of the Council of Science and Technology, which advises the prime minister on science and technology policy issues across government, and recently joined the board of governors of the Courtauld Institute of Art.

In recognition of her work, Black was appointed Commander of the Order of the British Empire (CBE) in the 2020 New Year Honours for services to the study of law and regulation. She was elevated to Dame Commander of the Order of the British Empire (DBE) in 2025.
