= Neville J. Williams =

British historian and archivist

Neville John Williams
- Born: 31 August 1924
- Died: 29 January 1977 (aged 52)
- Occupations: Historian, archivist, author
- Known for: Secretary of the British Academy

Neville John Williams (31 August 1924 – 29 January 1977) was a British historian and archivist. He spent much of his career working at the Public Record Office in London. Finally he served as secretary of the British Academy from 1973 until his death.

Alongside his professional work, Williams was a prolific author on history for a popular audience. As of October 2021, he had 29 entries in the British National Bibliography.
