= British Academy =

National academy of humanities and social sciences

The British Academy
- The British Academy for the Promotion of Historical, Philosophical and Philological Studies
- Formation: 1902; 124 years ago
- Type: National academy
- Legal status: Charity
- Headquarters: London, England
- Members: 1,500
- President: Julia Black
- Website: thebritishacademy.ac.uk

The British Academy (full name: The British Academy for the Promotion of Historical, Philosophical and Philological Studies) is the United Kingdom's national academy for the humanities and the social sciences. It was established in 1902 and received its royal charter in the same year. It is now a fellowship of more than 1,000 leading scholars spanning all disciplines across the humanities and social sciences and a funding body for research projects across the United Kingdom. The academy is a self-governing and independent registered charity, based at 10–11 Carlton House Terrace in London.

The British Academy is primarily funded with annual government grants. In 2022, £49.3m of its £51.7m of charitable income came from the Department for Business, Energy, and Industrial Strategy – in the same year it took in around £2.0m in trading income and £0.56m in other income. This funding is expected to continue under the new Department for Business and Trade.

== Purposes ==
The British Academy's premises on Carlton House Terrace

The academy states that it has five fundamental purposes:

- To speak up for the humanities and the social sciences
- To invest in the very best researchers and research
- To inform and enrich debate around society's greatest questions
- To ensure sustained international engagement and collaboration
- To make the most of the Academy's assets to secure the Academy for the future.

== History ==
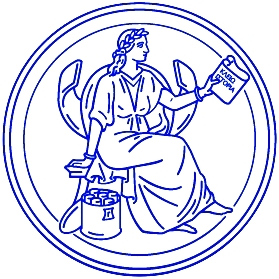
The British Academy's royal seal depicts the Greek muse Clio. She was redrawn by designer and illustrator Debbie Cook in 2008.

The creation of a "British Academy for the Promotion of Historical, Philosophical and Philological Studies" was first proposed in 1899 in order that Britain could be represented at meetings of European and American academies. The organisation, which has since become simply "the British Academy", was initiated as an unincorporated society on 17 December 1901, and received its Royal Charter from King Edward VII on 8 August 1902.

Since then, many of Britain's most distinguished scholars in the humanities and social sciences have been involved in the life of the academy, including John Maynard Keynes, Isaiah Berlin, C. S. Lewis and Henry Moore.

Until 1927–28 the academy had no premises. Then it moved to some rooms in No. 6 Burlington Gardens. In 1968 it moved the short distance to Burlington House. It subsequently moved to headquarters near Regent's Park. Then in 1998 the Academy moved to its present headquarters in Carlton House Terrace. Overlooking St James's Park, the terrace was designed by John Nash and built in the 1820s and 1830s. Number 10 was formerly the London residence of the Ridley family and number 11 was from 1856 to 1875 the home of Prime Minister William Gladstone.

In March 2010, the academy embarked on a £2.75m project to renovate and restore the public rooms in No. 11, following the departure of former tenant the Foreign Press Association, and link the two buildings together. The work was completed in January 2011 and the new spaces include a new 150-seat Wolfson Auditorium are available for public hire. In addition to offices for its staff 10 - 11 Carlton House Terrace is used for academy conferences and events and parts of the building are available on a private hire basis for events.

The history, problems and achievements of the academy have been recorded in works by two of its secretaries. Sir Frederic Kenyon's volume of 37 pages covers the years up to 1951; Sir Mortimer Wheeler's volume covers the years 1949 to 1968.

== Fellowship ==
Election as a Fellow of the British Academy recognises high scholarly distinction in the humanities or social sciences, evidenced by published work. Fellows may use the letters FBA after their names. Fellows are elected into one of the following disciplinary sections:

Humanities

- Classical Antiquity
- Theology and Religious Studies
- African and Oriental Studies
- Linguistics and Philology
- Early Modern Languages and Literatures
- Modern Languages, Literatures and other Media
- Archaeology
- Medieval Studies
- Early Modern History to c1800
- Modern History from c1800
- History of Art and Music
- Philosophy
- Culture, Media and Performance

Social Sciences

- Law
- Economics and Economic History
- Anthropology and Geography
- Sociology, Demography and Social Statistics
- Political Studies: Political Theory, Government and International Relations
- Psychology
- Management and Business Studies
- Education

== Funding schemes ==
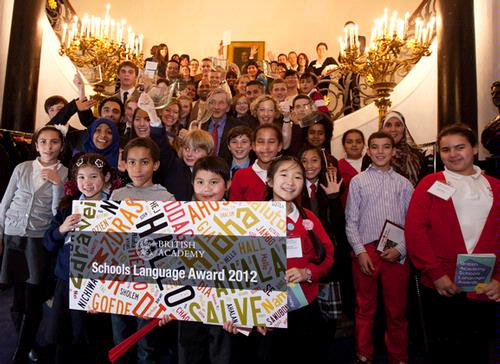
The British Academy has awarded prizes of £4,000 to 15 schools across the UK for encouraging innovative and creative foreign language teaching under the Schools Language Awards.

The British Academy channels substantial public funding into support for individuals and organisations pursuing humanities and social sciences research and scholarship in the UK and overseas. These funding schemes are designed to aid scholars at different stages of their academic career and include postdoctoral fellowships, Wolfson Research Professorships, Leverhulme Senior Research Fellowships, small research grants and British Academy Research Projects.

In addition to its main public funds supported by the Department for Business, Innovation and Skills, the academy also draws on private funds arising from gifts, legacies, contributions made by fellows and grants from research foundations to support a further range of research activities. In 2014/15, the academy received around £30m to support research and researchers across the humanities and social sciences. Funds available to the academy were invested in the following main areas: research career development; a portfolio of research grant opportunities, and international engagement. The demand and quality of applications submitted for academy funding remains high. This year the academy received around 3,600 applications and made 588 awards to scholars based in around 100 different universities across the UK – a success rate of 16 per cent.

== International work ==
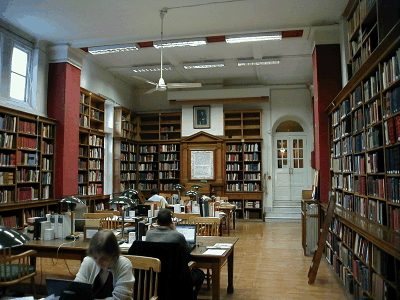
British School at Athens, one of the eight major British overseas research institutes supported by the British Academy.

In order to promote the interests of UK research and learning around the world, the Academy works to create frameworks to support international networking and collaboration and develop the role of humanities and social sciences research in tackling global challenges. It draws on expertise from a wide range of sources from within the fellowship and on specialist advice from its seven Area Panels for Africa, China, the Middle East, Europe, South Asia, and Latin America/Caribbean.

The Academy also funds and coordinates a network of overseas institutes which provide local expertise, logistical support and often a working base for UK scholars. These include research institutes in Amman, Ankara, Athens, Jerusalem, Nairobi, Rome and Tehran, as well as UK-based specialist learned societies which run strategic research programmes in other parts of the world including Africa, Latin America and South and South East Asia.

== Higher education and research ==
As the UK's national voice for the humanities and social sciences, the British Academy seeks to promote and protect the interests and health of these disciplines and their research base. It makes independent representations to the government and other bodies on relevant higher education and research issues, contributes statements and submissions to formal consultations and organises a range of policy events and discussions, liaising regularly with learned societies, universities, national academies and other relevant organisations.

== Policy work ==
The British Academy's Fellowship represents breadth and excellence of expertise across these disciplines, and the Academy's policy work is dedicated to applying that insight to policy issues for public benefit and societal well-being. The goal is to enlighten the context, meaning and practicalities of policy challenges. This work is meant to bring independence, authority and objectivity to complex issues, such as public policy, skills, education and research. From reports to small meetings, the British Academy provides a forum for examining issues that are important for the society and the economy.

== Public events ==
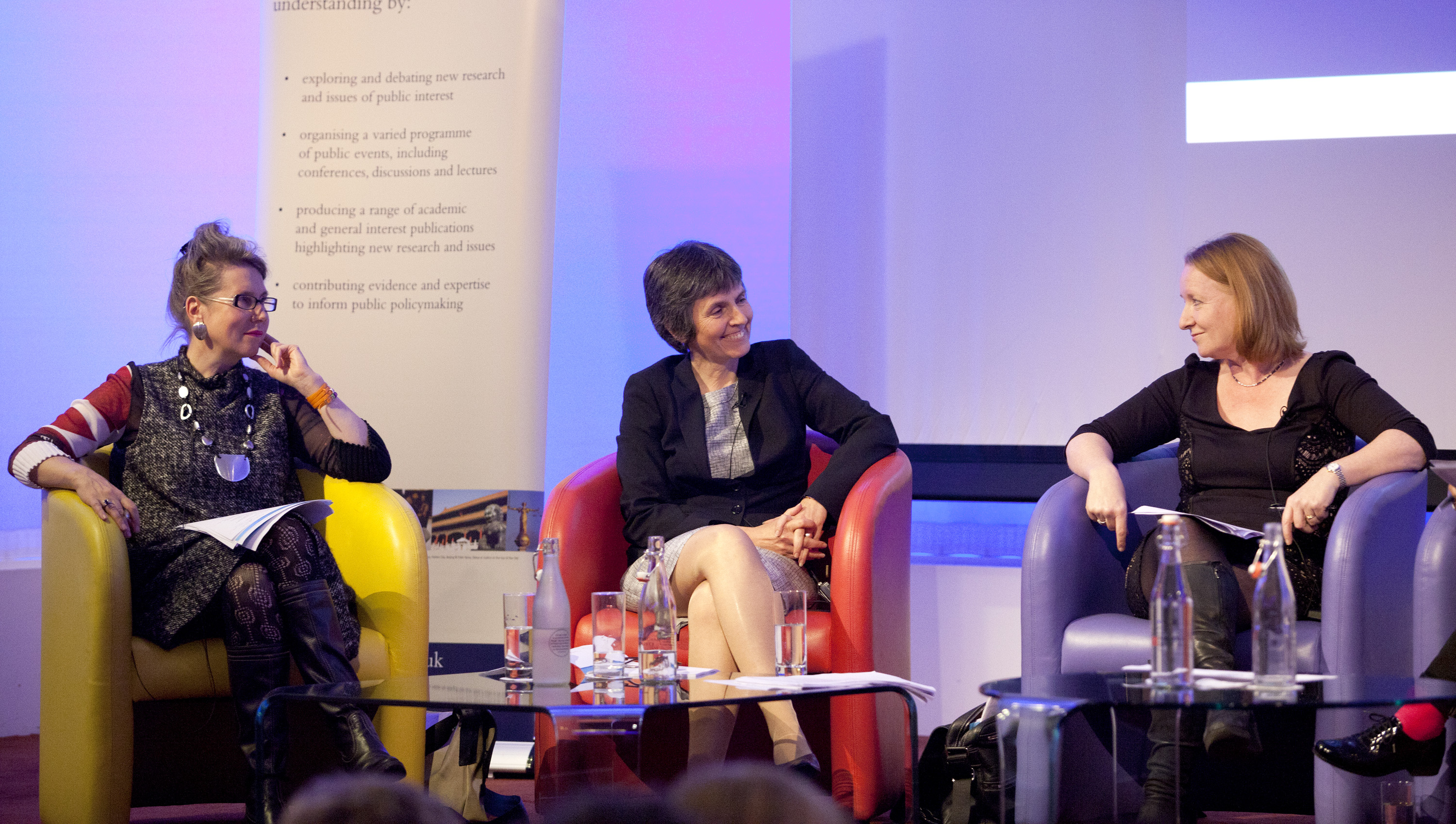
Three of the speakers at a British Academy panel discussion, "Where are all the women?"

The British Academy organises a wide-ranging annual programme of more than 50 public lectures, panel discussions, conferences and seminars showcasing new research and debating topical issues. This includes a number of long-established lecture series, such as the Shakespeare Lecture, first given in 1911. Most events are free and most take place at the Academy's headquarters in Carlton House Terrace

== Award of prizes ==
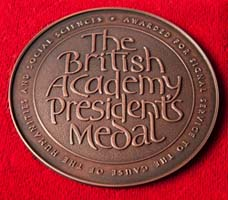
The President's Medal rewards signal service to the cause of the humanities and social sciences.

The British Academy awards a total of 15 prizes and medals, most of them awarded annually.

- British Academy President's Medal, created in 2010 and awarded to up to five recipients each year who have demonstrated "signal service to the cause of the humanities and social sciences"
- British Academy Medal, created in 2013 and awarded to up to three recipients each year "for landmark academic achievement in any of the humanities and social science disciplines supported by the Academy"
- Burkitt Medal, created in 1923
- Kenyon Medal, first awarded in 1957
- Leverhulme Medal and Prize, created in 2002
- British Academy Book Prize for Global Cultural Understanding, established in 2013
- Peter Townsend Policy Press Prize, created in 2011
- Wiley Prize in Psychology, first awarded in 2009
- Wiley Prize in Economics, first awarded in 2013
- Brian Barry Prize in Political Science, first awarded in 2014
- Serena Medal, first awarded in 1920
- Edward Ullendorff Medal, first awarded in 2012
- Rose Mary Crawshay Prize, first awarded in 1916
- Grahame Clark Medal, first awarded in 1993
- Sir Israel Gollancz Prize, first awarded in 1925
- Landscape Archaeology Medal, first awarded in 2007
- Neil & Saras Smith Medal for Linguistics, first awarded in 2014
- Derek Allen Prize, first awarded in 1977

== Presidents of the British Academy ==
- Donald James Mackay, 11th Lord Reay 1902–1906
- Sir Edward Maunde Thompson 1906–1909
- Samuel Henry Butcher 1909–1910
- Sir Adolphus Ward 1911–1913
- James Bryce, 1st Viscount Bryce 1913–1917
- Sir Frederic Kenyon 1917–1921
- Arthur Balfour, 1st Earl of Balfour 1921–1928
- H. A. L. Fisher 1928–1932
- John William Mackail 1932–1936
- Sir David Ross 1936–1940
- Sir J. H. Clapham 1940–1946
- Sir Idris Bell 1946–1950
- Sir Charles Kingsley Webster 1950–1954
- Sir George Norman Clark 1954–1958
- Sir Maurice Bowra 1958–1962
- Lionel Robbins, Baron Robbins 1962–1967
- Kenneth Clinton Wheare 1967–1971
- Sir Denys Lionel Page 1971–1974
- Sir Isaiah Berlin 1974–1978
- Sir Kenneth Dover 1978–1981
- Owen Chadwick 1981–1985
- Sir Randolph Quirk 1985–1989
- Sir Anthony Kenny 1989–1993
- Sir Keith Thomas 1993–1997
- Sir Tony Wrigley 1997–2001
- Garry Runciman, 3rd Viscount Runciman of Doxford 2001–2004
- Onora O'Neill, Baroness O'Neill of Bengarve 2005–2009
- Sir Adam Roberts 2009–2013
- Nicholas Stern, Baron Stern of Brentford 2013–2017
- Sir David Cannadine 2017–2021
- Dame Julia Black 2021–2025

== Secretaries of the British Academy ==
- Sir Israel Gollancz (1902–1930)
- Sir Frederic G. Kenyon (1930–1949)
- Sir Mortimer Wheeler (1949–1968)
- Derek Allen (1969–1973)
- N. J. Williams (1973–1977)
- J. P. Carswell (1978–1983)
- P. W. H. Brown (1983–2006)
- Robin Jackson (2006–2015)
- Alun Evans (2015–2019)
- Hetan Shah (2020-)

== Publications ==
Lectures and conferences papers

- British Academy Original Paperbacks
- British Academy Occasional Papers
- Proceedings of the British Academy
- Reissues of proceedings lectures
- Schweich Lectures on Biblical Archaeology
- Symposia
- Thank-Offering to Britain Fund Lectures

Monographs

- Archaeological reports (including BAMA)
- British Academy Centenary Monographs
- Miscellaneous research publications
- Postdoctoral Fellowship Monographs
- Supplemental papers

Research series

- Anglo-Saxon Charters
- Auctores Britannici Medii Aevi
- Classical and Medieval Logic Texts
- Corpus of Anglo-Saxon Stone Sculpture
- Corpus Signorum Imperii Romani
- Corpus vasorum antiquorum
- Corpus Vitrearum Medii Aevi
- Dictionary of Medieval Latin from British Sources
- Early English Church Music
- English Episcopal Acta
- Fontes Historiae Africanae
- Oriental and African Archives
- Oriental Documents
- Records of Social and Economic History
- Sylloge of Coins of the British Isles
- Sylloge Nummorum Graecorum
- Tabula Imperii Romani

== See also ==
- Category:Fellows of the British Academy
- Royal Society
- UK Young Academy
- Social Sciences, Humanities and the Arts for People and the Economy (SHAPE)
