= Max Roser =

German economist & philosopher (born 1983)

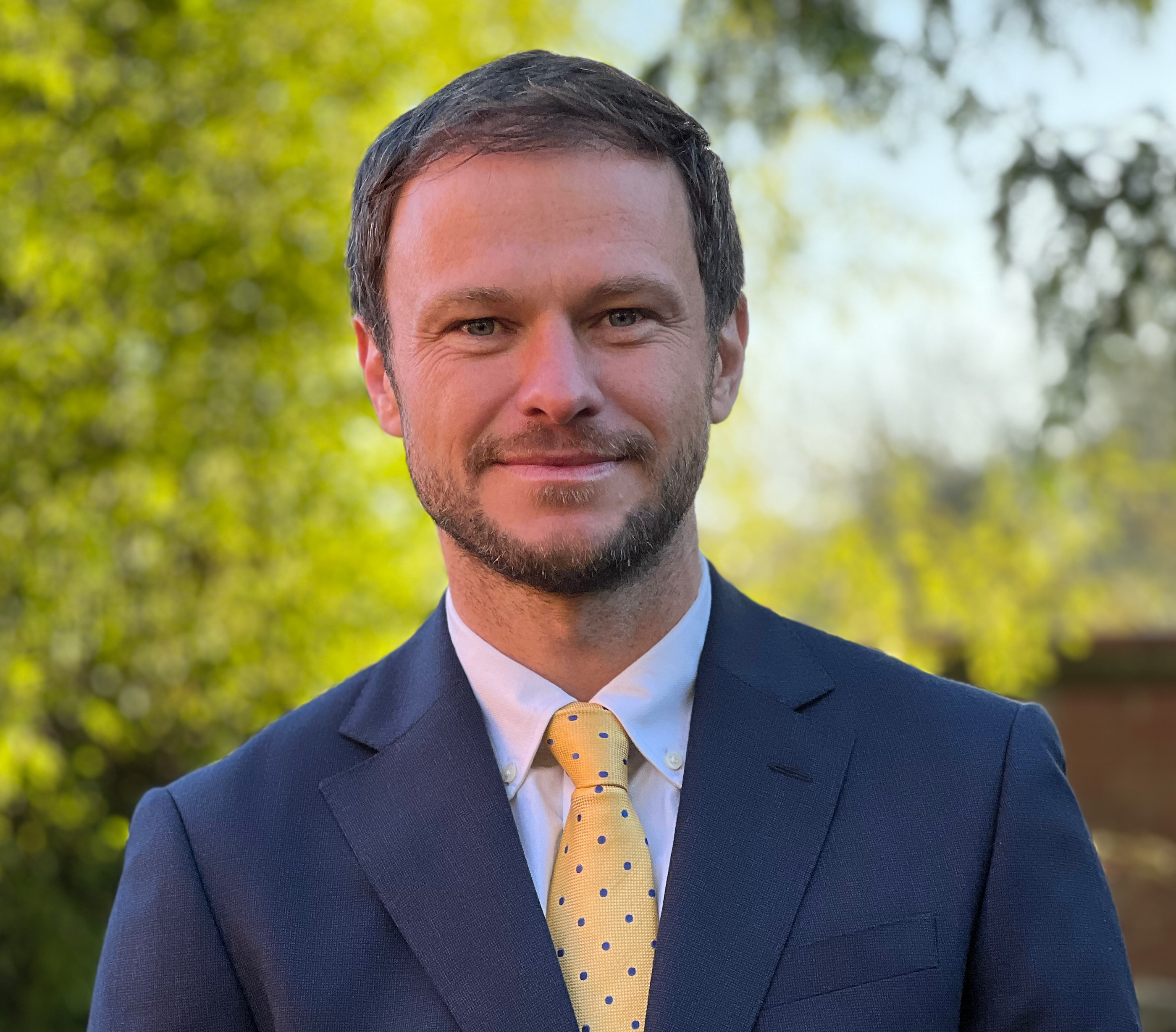
- Born: 1983 (age 42–43); Kirchheimbolanden, Germany

Academic background
- Influences: Tony Atkinson

Academic work
- Discipline: Economics of income distribution, poverty, global development, global health
- Institutions: Nuffield College, Oxford; Oxford Martin School
- Website: www.maxroser.com

Max Roser (born 1983) is a German economist and philosopher who focuses on global problems such as poverty, disease, hunger, climate change, war, existential risks, and inequality.

Roser is a professor at the University of Oxford, he directs the program on global development, at the Oxford Martin School. He is the founder and director of the research publication Our World in Data.

In 2025, he received an honorary doctorate from the Belgian Universities of KU Leuven and UCLouvain.

== Early life and education ==
Roser was born in Kirchheimbolanden, Germany, a village close to the border with France. In 1999, he and a friend won a prize in the German youth science competition Jugend forscht with a model of a self-navigating vacuum cleaner. According to Der Spiegel, in his youth he undertook extended travel, including along the Nile and across the Himalayas and the Andes.

He has two undergraduate degrees (in geoscience and philosophy) and two master's degrees (in economics and philosophy). Roser completed his doctoral dissertation in 2011 at the University of Innsbruck in Austria.

== Career ==
After completing his doctorate, Roser joined the University of Oxford in 2012 under the mentorship of economist Sir Tony Atkinson, a scholar of poverty and inequality. At Oxford, he collaborated with Piketty, Morelli, and Atkinson.

Roser founded Our World in Data, a scientific web publication presenting "research and data to make progress against the world’s largest problems."

In the early years, Roser largely built and funded Our World in Data on his own, financing the project through seasonal work as a bicycle tour guide in Europe. Roser credits Atkinson with encouraging him to publish his growing dataset on global living conditions, an idea that directly led to the creation of Our World in Data. In 2015, he established a research team at the University of Oxford, which is studying global development. In 2019, he worked with Y Combinator on Our World in Data.

=== Our World in Data ===
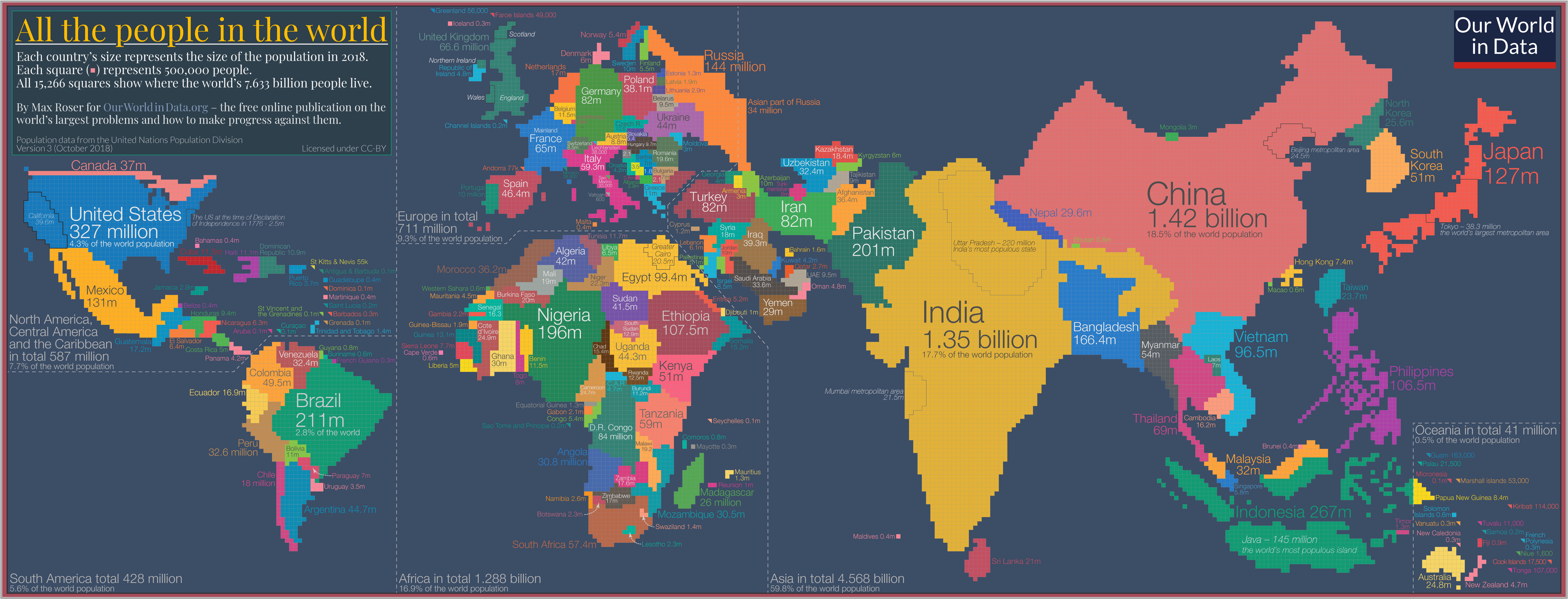
Cartogram by Max Roser showing the distribution of the global population. Each of the 15,266 pixels represents the home country of 500,000 people.

Our World in Data presents articles, datasets, and visualisations on topics including global health, hunger, economic growth, income inequality, violence, war, technology, education, and environmental change. The publication makes use of data visualisations which are licensed under Creative Commons and are used in research, media, and teaching.

Roser has argued that an emphasis on long-term indicators can complement event-focused news coverage. In contrast to the event-focused reporting of the news media Roser advocates the adoption of a broader perspective on global change, and in particular a focus on those living in poverty. The focus on the upper classes, especially in historical perspective, is misleading since it does not expose the hardship of those in the worst living conditions. He has shown that in many societies in the past, a large share (over 40%) of children died.

He said that there are three messages of his work: "The world is much better; The world is awful; The world can be much better". He wrote, "The mission of this work has never changed: from the first days in 2011, Our World in Data focused on the big global problems and asked how it is possible to make progress against them. The enemies of this effort were also always the same: apathy and cynicism."

Life expectancy by world region, from 1770 to 2018

Roser has published on changes in global living conditions and produced visualisations of the respective data.

He advocates for academics and researchers to openly share their knowledge to benefit the public. OWID publishes its content under open licenses. Its content is licensed for free reuse, and the tools and code are shared openly.

As of May 2025, his research was cited more than 50,000 times, according to Google Scholar. As of 2025, Our World in Data has an annual readership of 100 million people.

=== Research ===
Beyond building public resources, Roser has published original research. Poverty is a central focus: Roser’s work has examined how poverty is defined and measured worldwide. He has criticized the practice of focusing on the international poverty line alone and has suggested additional higher poverty lines: a global poverty line at $30 per day and a poverty line at 10.89 international dollars per day in the context of basic health. They stated this is the minimum level people needed to have access to basic healthcare. He proposes using several different poverty lines to understand what is happening to global poverty. The reason for the low global poverty line is to focus attention on the world's very poorest population. In 2015 research, he studied with Tony Atkinson, Brian Nolan, and others how benefits from economic growth are distributed. With Jesus Crespo Cuaresma, he studied the history of international trade.

During the COVID-19 pandemic, the OWID team compiled global datasets on testing, vaccinations and other datasets on the pandemic, and built tools to access them.

Economic inequality is a theme of Roser’s academic work, building on his doctoral research. In one of his studies, they investigated why median household incomes in many OECD countries have grown more slowly than GDP per capita, exploring factors behind the divergence between overall economic growth and typical living standards. To make historical inequality data more accessible, Roser co-published the Chartbook of Economic Inequality, which presents over a century of inequality indicators for 25 countries.

In the field of global health, Roser has published several studies. In 2019, he co-authored a Nature study of child mortality at subnational levels. He contributed to a textbook on global health textbook, and published on environmental and climate change. In 2017, Roser and Felix Pretis found that the growth rate in CO_{2} emission intensity exceeded the projections of all climate scenarios.

Global CO_{2} emissions by world region since 1750 – a chart from Our World in Data

In 2015, Tina Rosenberg wrote in The New York Times that Roser's work presents a "big picture that’s an important counterpoint to the constant barrage of negative world news." He has been part of the Statistical Advisory Panel of UNDP and spoke at UN institutions.

=== Data visualization ===
The data visualization expert Edward Tufte reprinted the work by Max Roser in his books. His population cartogram has been reproduced in outlets such as The Financial Times and The Economist, and in open source applications.

In 2015, Roser collaborated with Hans Rosling to produce a data visualization documentary for the BBC.

== Recognition ==
In 2019, he was listed among the "World’s Top 50 Thinkers" by Prospect Magazine. In the same year, Our World in Data won the Lovie Award.

In 2021, he received the Covid Innovation Heroes Award. He was selected as one of "The Future Perfect 50", as one of 50 scientists and writers who are building a better future. In 2025, the Universities of KU Leuven and UCLouvain awarded him an honorary doctorate.
