= Our World in Data =

Website that presents data and statistics of socially relevant topics

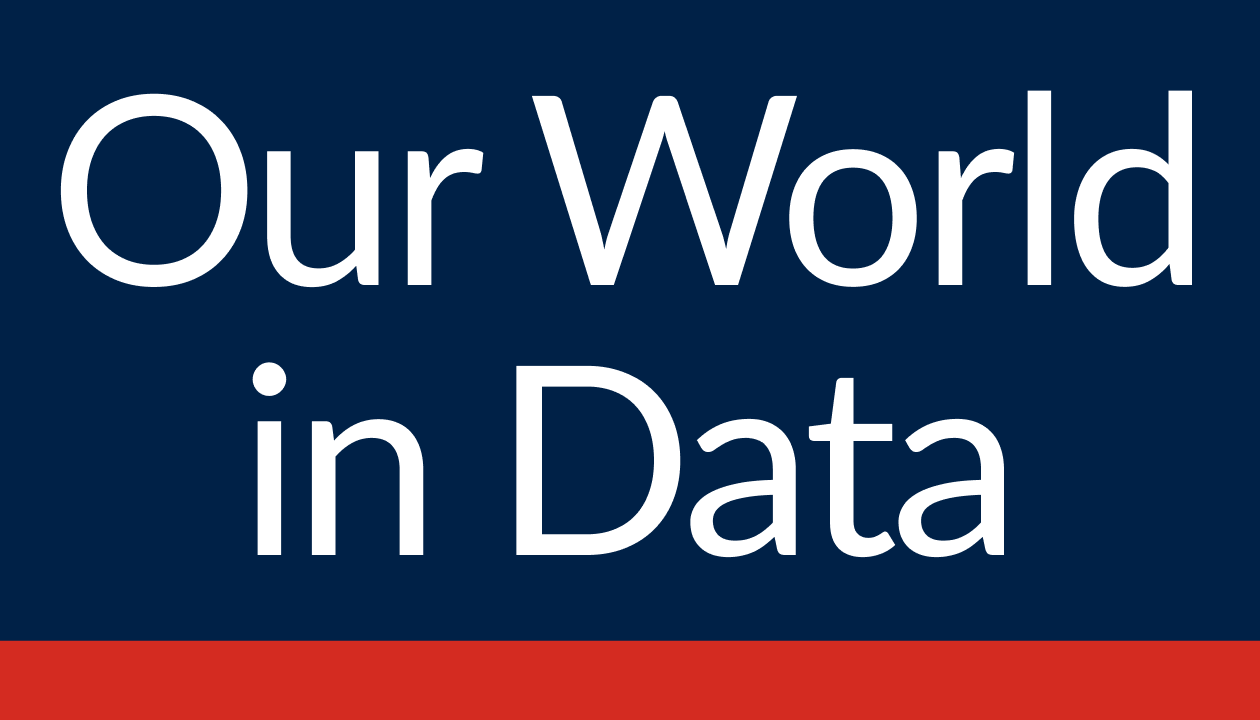
- Company type: Non-profit affiliated with the University of Oxford
- Headquarters: Oxford, England
- Owner: Global Change Data Lab
- Founder: Max Roser
- Revenue: ▲£2,450,820 (2023)
- Website: ourworldindata.org
- Commercial: No
- Launched: May 2013 (13 years ago)
- Current status: Active

Our World in Data (OWID) is a scientific online publication that focuses on large global problems such as poverty, disease, hunger, war, climate change, population growth, existential risks, and inequality.

It is a project of the Global Change Data Lab, a registered charity in England and Wales, and was founded by Max Roser, a social historian and development economist. The research team is based at the University of Oxford. The organization is chaired by Hetan Shah.

== Content ==
Our World in Data uses interactive charts and maps to illustrate research findings, often taking a long-term view to show how global living conditions have changed over time.

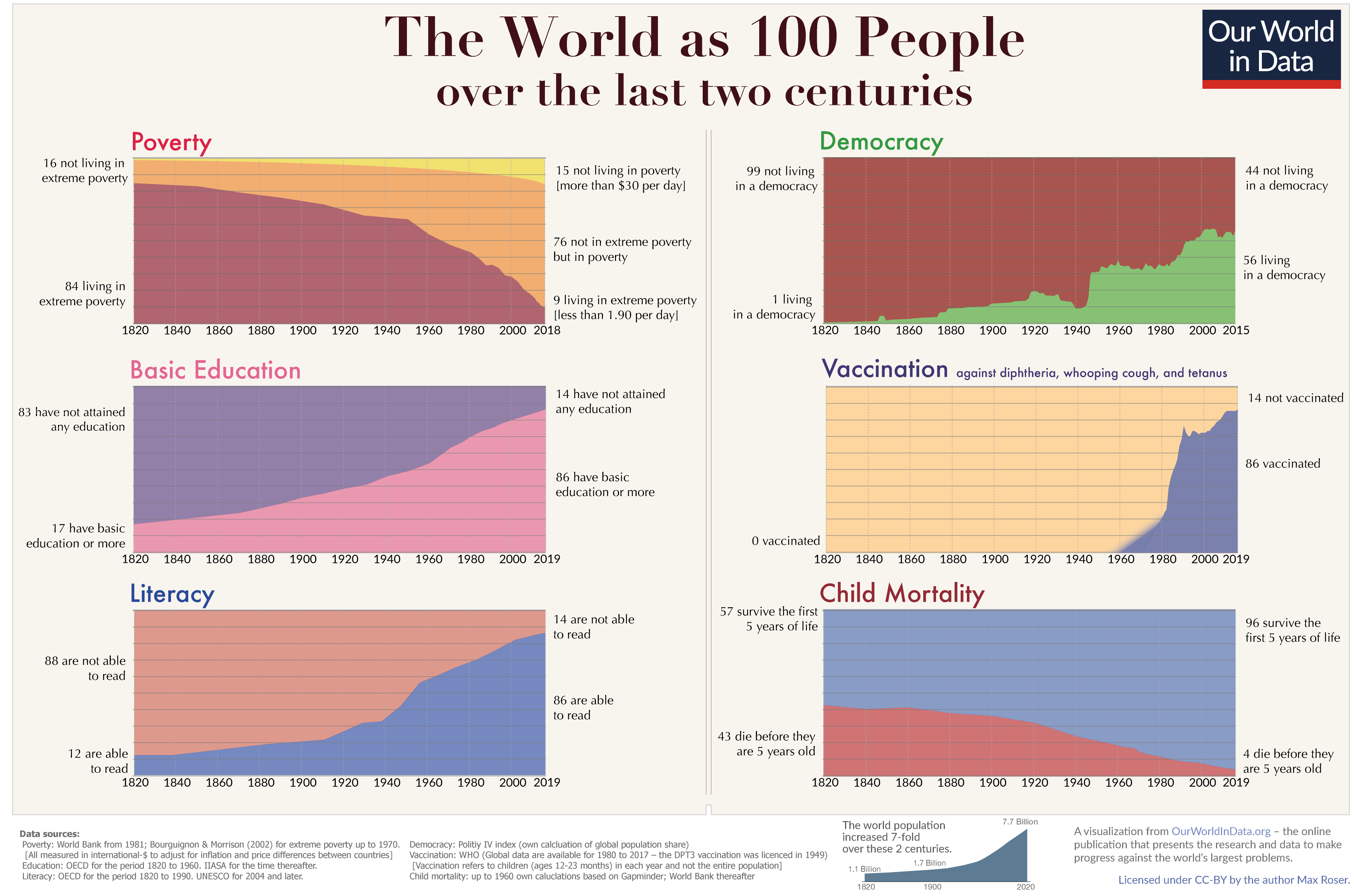
Compilation of graphs from the organization, showing the overall global percentages of the last two centuries, in six factors: extreme poverty, democracy, basic education, vaccination, literacy, and child mortality

Global CO_{2} emissions by world region since 1750
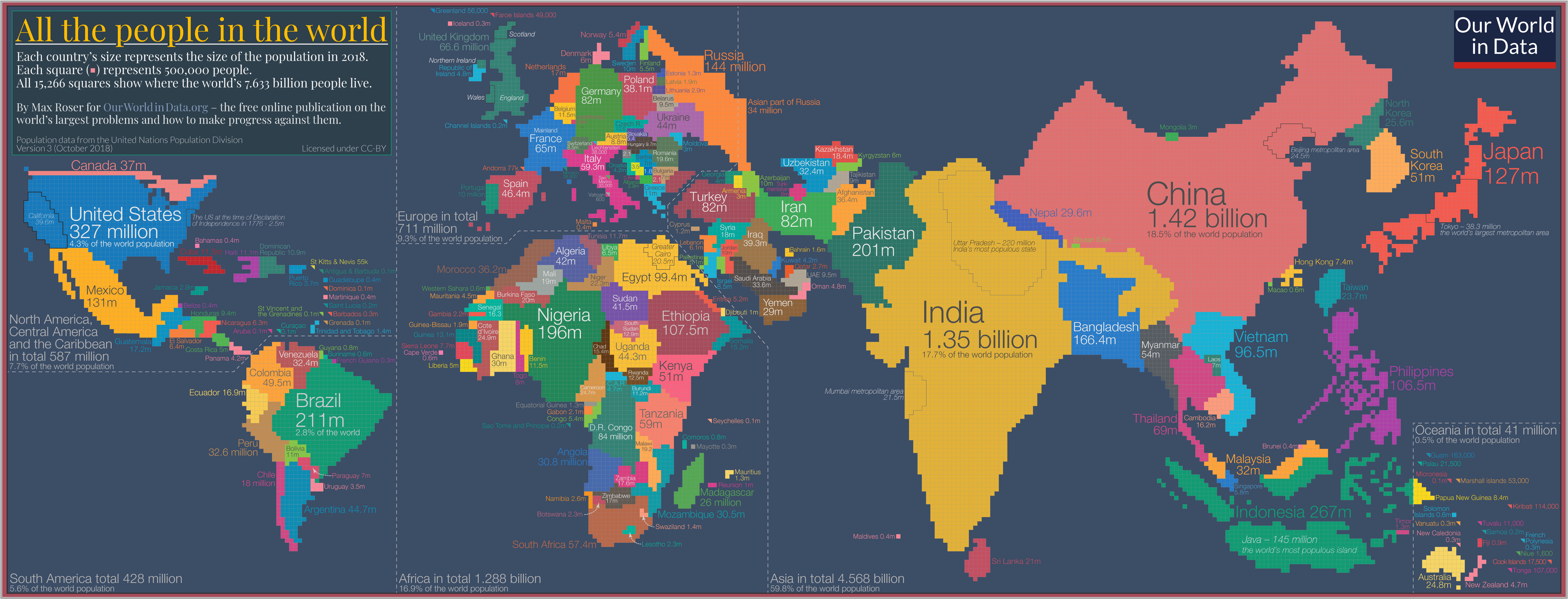
Cartogram showing the distribution of the global population. Each of the 15,266 pixels represents the home country of 500,000 people.

An interactive graph from OWID showing death rate from opioid use

As of April 2024, Our World in Data categorize their charts and articles by the following topics on their website:

- Population and Demographic Change
- Health
- Energy and Environment
- Food and Agriculture
- Poverty and Economic Development
- Education and Knowledge
- Innovation and Technological Change
- Living Conditions, Community, and Wellbeing
- Human Rights and Democracy
- Violence and War

== History ==
Roser began his work on the project in 2011, adding a research team at the University of Oxford later on. In the first years, Roser developed the publication together with inequality researcher Sir Tony Atkinson. Hannah Ritchie joined in 2017 and became Head of Research. Edouard Mathieu joined in 2020 and became Head of Data. The organization began the COVID-19 pandemic with six staff members, and grew to 20 by late 2021.

In 2019, Our World in Data won the Lovie Award, a European web award, and was one of three nonprofit organizations in Y Combinator's Winter 2019 cohort.

Beginning in 2020, Our World in Data added an emphasis on publishing global data and research on the COVID-19 pandemic:

- They created and maintained a worldwide database on vaccinations for COVID-19, which was used as the source for data published by the World Health Organization, researchers and other international organizations, journals, and numerous newspapers.
- Similarly, the team built and maintained a global dataset on COVID-19 testing which was used by the United Nations, the White House, the World Health Organization, and epidemiologists and researchers, and also published data such as hospitalizations and computations of excess deaths.

In 2021, the team began campaigning for the International Energy Agency to make the data it collects from national governments publicly available.

== Funding and collaborations ==
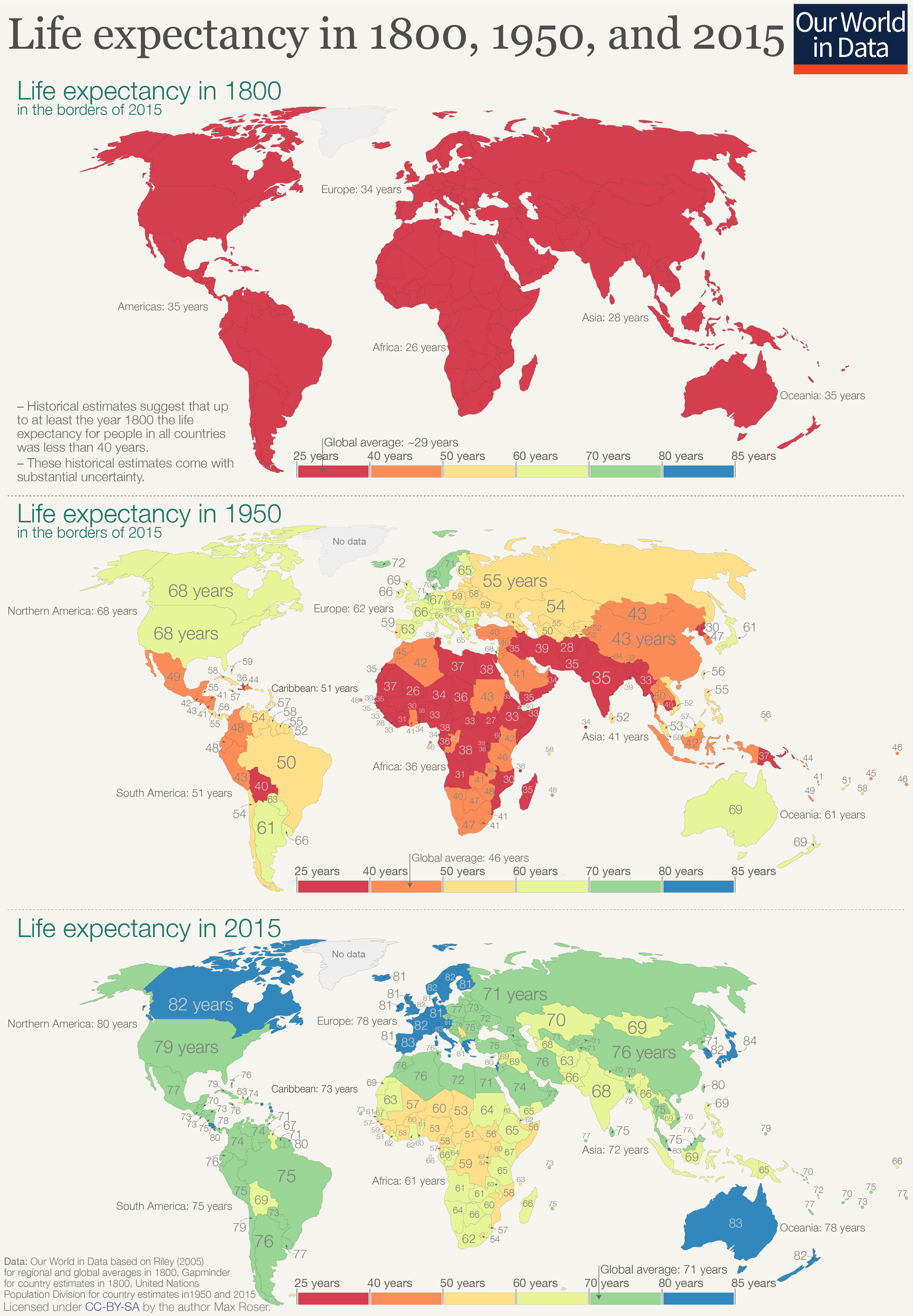
Life expectancy in 1800, 1950, and 2015

Global Change Data Lab, the non-profit that publishes Our World in Data and the open-access data tools that make the online publication possible, is funded through a mix of grants, sponsors, and reader donations.

- The first grant to support the research project was given by the Nuffield Foundation, a London-based foundation focused on social policy.
- Other grantors supporting the project have included the Quadrature Climate Foundation, the Bill and Melinda Gates Foundation, and a grant from German philanthropist Susanne Klatten. In the past, Our World in Data has also received grants from the World Health Organization, the Department of Health and Social Care in the United Kingdom, and the Effective Altruism Meta Fund.
- Reader donations are also a major source of funding. In 2020, more than 3,000 individuals supported the project, exceeding 4,000 donors by 2023. The list of donors includes Jamie Metzl and YouTuber Hank Green.

The research team collaborated with the science YouTube channel Kurzgesagt.

During the COVID-19 pandemic, the team partnered with epidemiologists from Harvard's Chan School of Public Health and the Robert Koch Institute to study countries that have responded successfully in the early phase of the pandemic. Janine Aron and John Muellbauer worked with OWID to research excess mortality during the pandemic.

In 2022, FTX's Future Fund offered Our World in Data a $7.5 million grant to support their activities. Max Roser told Fortune that Our World in Data's board of trustees ultimately rejected the grant money after conducting due diligence and other checks.

== Usage ==
In 2021, the Our World in Data website had 89 million unique visitors.

Our World in Data has been cited in academic scientific journals, medicine and global health journals, and social science journals. The Washington Post, The New York Times, and The Economist have used Our World in Data as a source.

The site uses permissive licenses to allow others to copy, modify, and distribute the work (CC BY for content and the MIT License for software).

== See also ==
- Gapminder Foundation
