= List of North American countries by life expectancy =

North American countries by life expectancy

This is a list of North American countries by life expectancy.

== United Nations (2023) ==
Estimation of the analytical agency of the UN.

=== UN: Estimate of life expectancy for various ages in 2023 ===
Countries and territories	Life expectancy for population in general							Life expectancy for male				Life expectancy for female				Sex gap				Population (thous.)	
Countries and territories	at birth	bonus 0→15	at 15	bonus 15→65	at 65	bonus 65→80	at 80	at birth	at 15	at 65	at 80	at birth	at 15	at 65	at 80	at birth	at 15	at 65	at 80	Population (thous.)	
Saint Barthélemy	84.29	0.58	69.87	1.84	21.71	3.70	10.41	81.46	67.08	19.35	8.74	86.81	72.36	23.71	11.53	5.35	5.28	4.37	2.79	11	(Saint Barthélemy)
Canada	82.63	0.46	68.09	3.39	21.48	3.84	10.32	80.43	65.92	20.03	9.36	84.83	70.25	22.81	11.08	4.40	4.33	2.77	1.72	39299	(Canada)
Martinique	82.56	0.84	68.41	3.07	21.47	4.07	10.54	79.25	65.14	19.30	9.44	85.62	71.41	23.43	11.36	6.36	6.28	4.14	1.92	346	(Martinique)
Bermuda	82.31	0.26	67.56	3.25	20.81	4.01	9.82	78.86	64.18	18.01	8.02	85.74	70.92	23.36	11.12	6.89	6.73	5.36	3.10	65	(Bermuda)
Guadeloupe	82.05	0.80	67.85	4.10	21.95	4.17	11.11	78.13	64.05	19.50	9.28	85.53	71.18	23.97	12.36	7.40	7.13	4.47	3.08	377	(Guadeloupe)
Puerto Rico	81.69	0.55	67.24	3.63	20.88	4.63	10.51	78.03	63.59	18.61	9.24	85.24	70.79	22.92	11.52	7.21	7.19	4.31	2.27	3242	(Puerto Rico)
Costa Rica	80.80	0.73	66.53	4.21	20.74	4.07	9.81	78.13	63.89	19.21	8.75	83.42	69.11	22.09	10.60	5.29	5.23	2.88	1.84	5106	(Costa Rica)
Cayman Islands	80.36	0.22	65.58	5.05	20.64	4.19	9.82	77.98	63.18	18.76	8.69	82.87	68.11	22.51	10.79	4.89	4.93	3.75	2.11	73	(Cayman Islands)
Saint Martin	80.22	0.88	66.11	2.73	18.84	4.76	8.61	76.77	62.75	16.23	6.95	83.84	69.60	21.50	10.02	7.07	6.84	5.27	3.07	28	(Collectivity of Saint Martin)
Panama	79.59	1.49	66.09	4.49	20.58	4.49	10.06	76.65	63.23	18.64	8.89	82.56	68.95	22.35	10.94	5.90	5.72	3.71	2.05	4459	(Panama)
Anguilla	79.31	0.54	64.85	3.48	18.33	4.98	8.30	76.03	61.70	16.09	7.04	82.66	68.04	20.46	9.18	6.64	6.35	4.38	2.14	14	(Anguilla)
USA	79.30	0.57	64.88	5.12	20.00	4.61	9.61	76.86	62.47	18.67	8.87	81.85	67.38	21.22	10.17	4.99	4.91	2.55	1.30	343477	(United States)
Cuba	78.08	0.57	63.66	4.57	18.23	5.90	9.13	75.67	61.30	16.74	8.41	80.52	66.02	19.60	9.70	4.85	4.71	2.87	1.29	11020	(Cuba)
Turks and Caicos Islands	78.01	0.56	63.56	4.12	17.68	5.21	7.89	75.83	61.41	16.11	7.10	80.30	65.81	19.20	8.55	4.47	4.40	3.09	1.46	46	(Turks and Caicos Islands)
Antigua and Barbuda	77.60	0.86	63.46	4.94	18.41	5.37	8.78	74.55	60.42	16.01	7.02	80.29	66.14	20.33	9.88	5.75	5.71	4.32	2.86	93	(Antigua and Barbuda)
Caribbean Netherlands	77.44	1.13	63.56	3.43	17.00	5.45	7.45	75.23	61.41	15.37	6.49	80.16	66.24	18.96	8.39	4.93	4.83	3.58	1.90	30	(Caribbean Netherlands)
British Virgin Islands	77.28	1.10	63.37	3.35	16.73	5.49	7.22	74.53	60.78	15.07	6.42	80.05	65.96	18.31	7.80	5.52	5.18	3.23	1.38	39	(British Virgin Islands)
Curaçao	76.80	0.97	62.77	4.08	16.86	5.70	7.56	72.46	58.58	13.90	5.78	80.82	66.61	19.23	8.55	8.37	8.03	5.33	2.77	185	(Curaçao)
Saint Pierre and Miquelon	76.76	0.87	62.62	4.18	16.81	5.75	7.56	72.75	58.81	14.52	6.37	81.52	67.16	19.26	8.33	8.76	8.35	4.74	1.96	6	(Saint Pierre and Miquelon)
Sint Maarten	76.37	1.31	62.68	3.73	16.41	5.74	7.14	73.70	60.16	14.67	6.15	79.53	65.67	18.54	8.14	5.83	5.51	3.87	1.98	43	(Sint Maarten)
Aruba	76.35	1.26	62.61	3.79	16.40	4.78	6.17	73.70	60.02	14.81	5.20	78.78	64.97	17.71	6.78	5.08	4.95	2.90	1.58	108	(Aruba)
Montserrat	76.19	0.65	61.84	4.01	15.85	6.04	6.88	74.11	59.76	14.44	6.02	78.81	64.47	17.68	7.61	4.70	4.71	3.24	1.60	4	(Montserrat)
Barbados	76.18	0.90	62.08	4.57	16.65	5.11	6.76	73.63	59.59	15.01	5.72	78.61	64.45	18.09	7.51	4.98	4.85	3.09	1.79	282	(Barbados)
US Virgin Islands	75.47	0.70	61.17	4.96	16.13	6.07	7.20	70.51	56.34	13.16	5.53	81.35	66.88	19.43	8.68	10.84	10.55	6.27	3.15	86	(United States Virgin Islands)
Grenada	75.20	1.41	61.62	5.86	17.48	6.45	8.92	72.36	58.81	15.32	7.50	78.36	64.73	19.67	9.97	6.00	5.92	4.35	2.47	117	(Grenada)
Mexico	75.07	1.10	61.17	6.52	17.70	5.60	8.29	72.24	58.40	17.04	8.38	77.81	63.84	18.26	8.23	5.57	5.44	1.22	−0.15	129740	(Mexico)
Nicaragua	74.95	1.25	61.20	5.56	16.75	5.28	7.04	72.31	58.62	15.44	6.33	77.42	63.58	17.77	7.48	5.11	4.96	2.33	1.15	6824	(Nicaragua)
Bahamas	74.55	1.08	60.63	7.14	17.77	6.32	9.09	70.91	57.02	15.66	7.60	78.19	64.21	19.67	10.26	7.28	7.19	4.01	2.66	399	(The Bahamas)
Dominican Republic	73.72	2.47	61.19	5.94	17.13	6.18	8.31	70.53	58.11	15.25	6.98	76.97	64.31	18.81	9.24	6.44	6.19	3.56	2.26	11331	(Dominican Republic)
Belize	73.57	0.89	59.45	5.97	15.42	6.59	7.01	70.93	56.87	14.26	6.75	76.50	62.31	16.65	7.25	5.57	5.44	2.39	0.50	411	(Belize)
Trinidad and Tobago	73.49	1.36	59.85	6.49	16.34	5.54	6.89	70.38	56.81	14.84	6.18	76.68	62.96	17.61	7.32	6.30	6.14	2.77	1.14	1503	(Trinidad and Tobago)
World	73.17	3.29	61.46	6.11	17.57	5.75	8.31	70.55	58.91	16.01	7.43	75.89	64.09	18.98	8.96	5.34	5.18	2.97	1.53	8091735	
Honduras	72.88	1.35	59.23	5.85	15.09	6.58	6.67	70.35	56.78	13.57	5.99	75.50	61.75	16.51	7.14	5.16	4.96	2.95	1.15	10645	(Honduras)
Saint Lucia	72.70	1.47	59.17	5.83	15.00	6.61	6.61	69.31	55.87	13.21	5.86	76.30	62.66	16.64	7.11	6.99	6.79	3.43	1.25	179	(Saint Lucia)
Guatemala	72.60	1.79	59.39	6.76	16.15	5.49	6.64	70.31	57.22	15.46	6.19	74.88	61.53	16.77	7.01	4.57	4.30	1.32	0.82	18125	(Guatemala)
Saint Kitts and Nevis	72.14	1.30	58.45	6.42	14.86	6.80	6.66	68.57	54.95	13.07	5.89	76.02	62.23	16.69	7.20	7.45	7.28	3.62	1.31	47	(Saint Kitts and Nevis)
El Salvador	72.10	1.03	58.13	8.00	16.12	5.91	7.04	67.52	53.57	14.63	6.33	76.26	62.25	17.25	7.49	8.74	8.69	2.62	1.15	6310	(El Salvador)
Jamaica	71.48	1.62	58.10	6.41	14.51	6.83	6.34	68.97	55.72	13.38	5.93	73.99	60.47	15.50	6.65	5.02	4.75	2.12	0.72	2840	(Jamaica)
Saint Vincent and the Grenadines	71.23	1.28	57.51	7.29	14.80	6.79	6.59	68.66	54.89	13.36	6.00	74.31	60.66	16.41	7.10	5.65	5.77	3.05	1.10	101	(Saint Vincent and the Grenadines)
Dominica	71.13	2.67	58.80	5.43	14.23	6.88	6.10	68.21	56.01	12.88	5.55	74.55	62.07	15.72	6.52	6.33	6.06	2.84	0.96	67	(Dominica)
Greenland	70.06	1.66	56.71	7.93	14.64	6.72	6.36	68.09	54.93	14.01	6.02	72.44	58.89	15.43	6.64	4.35	3.96	1.42	0.62	56	(Greenland)
Haiti	64.94	4.48	54.42	8.71	13.13	7.42	5.54	61.73	51.54	12.05	5.14	68.30	57.39	14.05	5.81	6.57	5.84	2.00	0.67	11637	(Haiti)

=== UN: Change of life expectancy from 2019 to 2023 ===
Countries and territories	2023				Historical data									Recovery from COVID-19: 2019→2023	Population (thous.)	
Countries and territories	All	Male	Female	Sex gap	2019	2019 →2020	2020	2020 →2021	2021	2021 →2022	2022	2022 →2023	2023	Recovery from COVID-19: 2019→2023	Population (thous.)	
Saint Barthélemy	84.29	81.46	86.81	5.35	83.82	0.25	84.07	0.12	84.19	0.09	84.28	0.01	84.29	0.47	11	(Saint Barthélemy)
Canada	82.63	80.43	84.83	4.40	82.28	−0.63	81.65	0.32	81.98	−0.73	81.25	1.38	82.63	0.34	39299	(Canada)
Martinique	82.56	79.25	85.62	6.36	82.07	−1.81	80.27	−2.53	77.74	3.10	80.84	1.73	82.56	0.49	346	(Martinique)
Bermuda	82.31	78.86	85.74	6.89	81.25	0.20	81.46	0.29	81.75	0.32	82.06	0.25	82.31	1.06	65	(Bermuda)
Guadeloupe	82.05	78.13	85.53	7.40	81.39	−0.74	80.65	−2.44	78.21	2.69	80.91	1.15	82.05	0.66	377	(Guadeloupe)
Puerto Rico	81.69	78.03	85.24	7.21	81.44	−1.43	80.01	−0.24	79.77	−0.34	79.43	2.26	81.69	0.25	3242	(Puerto Rico)
Costa Rica	80.80	78.13	83.42	5.29	80.30	−0.57	79.72	−1.68	78.05	1.27	79.32	1.48	80.80	0.50	5106	(Costa Rica)
Cayman Islands	80.36	77.98	82.87	4.89	79.05	0.18	79.23	0.07	79.30	0.68	79.98	0.37	80.36	1.31	73	(Cayman Islands)
Saint Martin	80.22	76.77	83.84	7.07	80.08	0.01	80.08	0.12	80.21	0.03	80.24	−0.01	80.22	0.15	28	(Collectivity of Saint Martin)
Panama	79.59	76.65	82.56	5.90	78.51	−2.18	76.33	0.67	77.00	2.32	79.32	0.27	79.59	1.08	4459	(Panama)
Anguilla	79.31	76.03	82.66	6.64	78.42	0.23	78.66	−0.24	78.41	0.70	79.12	0.19	79.31	0.89	14	(Anguilla)
USA	79.30	76.86	81.85	4.99	78.92	−1.91	77.01	−0.63	76.38	1.59	77.98	1.32	79.30	0.39	343477	(United States)
Cuba	78.08	75.67	80.52	4.85	77.41	−0.01	77.41	−4.21	73.20	4.43	77.63	0.46	78.08	0.67	11020	(Cuba)
Turks and Caicos Islands	78.01	75.83	80.30	4.47	77.69	−0.19	77.50	−0.27	77.23	0.68	77.92	0.09	78.01	0.32	46	(Turks and Caicos Islands)
Antigua and Barbuda	77.60	74.55	80.29	5.75	77.17	−0.01	77.16	0.04	77.20	0.29	77.48	0.12	77.60	0.43	93	(Antigua and Barbuda)
Caribbean Netherlands	77.44	75.23	80.16	4.93	77.24	−0.02	77.21	0.67	77.88	0.27	78.15	−0.72	77.44	0.20	30	(Caribbean Netherlands)
British Virgin Islands	77.28	74.53	80.05	5.52	76.84	0.05	76.89	−1.60	75.30	1.88	77.18	0.10	77.28	0.43	39	(British Virgin Islands)
Curaçao	76.80	72.46	80.82	8.37	76.49	0.01	76.50	−0.81	75.69	1.04	76.73	0.07	76.80	0.31	185	(Curaçao)
Saint Pierre and Miquelon	76.76	72.75	81.52	8.76	76.61	0.01	76.62	0.05	76.67	0.03	76.70	0.06	76.76	0.15	6	(Saint Pierre and Miquelon)
Sint Maarten	76.37	73.70	79.53	5.83	75.68	−0.68	75.00	−0.50	74.50	1.68	76.18	0.19	76.37	0.69	43	(Sint Maarten)
Aruba	76.35	73.70	78.78	5.08	76.02	−0.61	75.41	−1.75	73.66	2.57	76.23	0.13	76.35	0.33	108	(Aruba)
Montserrat	76.19	74.11	78.81	4.70	75.60	−0.03	75.57	0.33	75.90	0.14	76.04	0.15	76.19	0.59	4	(Montserrat)
Barbados	76.18	73.63	78.61	4.98	76.50	0.15	76.65	−0.07	76.58	−0.90	75.68	0.50	76.18	−0.32	282	(Barbados)
US Virgin Islands	75.47	70.51	81.35	10.84	74.88	−0.16	74.71	−0.10	74.61	0.43	75.05	0.43	75.47	0.60	86	(United States Virgin Islands)
Grenada	75.20	72.36	78.36	6.00	74.97	0.05	75.02	−0.50	74.52	0.63	75.15	0.05	75.20	0.23	117	(Grenada)
Mexico	75.07	72.24	77.81	5.57	74.53	−4.08	70.45	−0.70	69.75	4.22	73.97	1.10	75.07	0.54	129740	(Mexico)
Nicaragua	74.95	72.31	77.42	5.11	73.76	−3.00	70.77	−0.29	70.48	3.98	74.46	0.48	74.95	1.18	6824	(Nicaragua)
Bahamas	74.55	70.91	78.19	7.28	71.41	1.59	72.99	−2.24	70.75	3.74	74.49	0.06	74.55	3.14	399	(The Bahamas)
Dominican Republic	73.72	70.53	76.97	6.44	73.11	−0.48	72.64	−0.88	71.76	2.45	74.21	−0.49	73.72	0.61	11331	(Dominican Republic)
Belize	73.57	70.93	76.50	5.57	72.58	−1.00	71.58	−0.66	70.92	1.27	72.19	1.38	73.57	0.99	411	(Belize)
Trinidad and Tobago	73.49	70.38	76.68	6.30	72.84	−0.19	72.64	−1.53	71.11	2.22	73.33	0.16	73.49	0.65	1503	(Trinidad and Tobago)
World	73.17	70.55	75.89	5.34	72.61	−0.69	71.92	−1.05	70.86	1.77	72.64	0.53	73.17	0.56	8091735	
Honduras	72.88	70.35	75.50	5.16	72.12	−1.26	70.86	−1.37	69.49	3.22	72.72	0.17	72.88	0.76	10645	(Honduras)
Saint Lucia	72.70	69.31	76.30	6.99	72.25	0.06	72.31	−3.19	69.12	3.55	72.67	0.03	72.70	0.45	179	(Saint Lucia)
Guatemala	72.60	70.31	74.88	4.57	71.64	−1.67	69.97	−2.11	67.86	3.35	71.21	1.40	72.60	0.96	18125	(Guatemala)
Saint Kitts and Nevis	72.14	68.57	76.02	7.45	71.54	−0.36	71.18	−1.91	69.27	1.04	70.31	1.83	72.14	0.60	47	(Saint Kitts and Nevis)
El Salvador	72.10	67.52	76.26	8.74	71.72	−1.48	70.24	−0.30	69.94	2.03	71.97	0.13	72.10	0.37	6310	(El Salvador)
Jamaica	71.48	68.97	73.99	5.02	71.53	−0.08	71.45	−2.37	69.08	2.40	71.48	0.00	71.48	−0.05	2840	(Jamaica)
Saint Vincent and the Grenadines	71.23	68.66	74.31	5.65	70.99	−1.39	69.61	−0.47	69.13	2.06	71.19	0.04	71.23	0.24	101	(Saint Vincent and the Grenadines)
Dominica	71.13	68.21	74.55	6.33	71.31	−0.04	71.27	−1.44	69.83	1.25	71.08	0.05	71.13	−0.17	67	(Dominica)
Greenland	70.06	68.09	72.44	4.35	70.26	−0.10	70.16	−0.11	70.05	0.00	70.05	0.00	70.06	−0.20	56	(Greenland)
Haiti	64.94	61.73	68.30	6.57	64.33	−0.56	63.77	−1.16	62.61	1.33	63.95	0.99	64.94	0.61	11637	(Haiti)

== World Bank Group (2024) ==
Estimation of the World Bank Group for 2024. The data is filtered according to the list of countries in North America. The values in the World Bank Group tables are rounded. All calculations are based on raw data; so due to the nuances of rounding, in some places illusory inconsistencies of indicators arose, with a size of 0.01 year.

World Bank Group (2024)
Countries and territories	2024				Historical data													recovery from COVID-19: 2019→2024	
Countries and territories	All	Male	Female	Sex gap	2014	2014 →2019	2019	2019 →2020	2020	2020 →2021	2021	2021 →2022	2022	2022 →2023	2023	2023 →2024	2024	recovery from COVID-19: 2019→2024	
Bermuda	82.49	79.06	85.87	6.81	80.20	1.05	81.25	0.20	81.46	0.29	81.75	0.32	82.06	0.25	82.31	0.18	82.49	1.24	(Bermuda)
Canada	82.11	80.03	84.29	4.26	81.78	0.37	82.16	−0.63	81.53	−0.08	81.45	−0.36	81.09	0.53	81.63	0.48	82.11	−0.05	(Canada)
Puerto Rico	81.90	78.28	85.38	7.10	80.04	1.40	81.44	−1.43	80.01	−0.24	79.77	−0.34	79.43	2.26	81.69	0.21	81.90	0.46	(Puerto Rico)
Costa Rica	81.00	78.37	83.58	5.21	80.23	0.07	80.30	−0.57	79.72	−1.67	78.05	1.27	79.32	1.48	80.80	0.20	81.00	0.70	(Costa Rica)
Virgin Islands (U.S.)	80.77	77.60	84.10	6.50	78.87	0.80	79.67	0.15	79.82	0.25	80.07	0.25	80.32	0.20	80.52	0.25	80.77	1.10	(United States Virgin Islands)
Cayman Islands	80.54	78.20	83.00	4.81	77.86	1.19	79.05	0.18	79.23	0.07	79.30	0.68	79.98	0.37	80.36	0.18	80.54	1.49	(Cayman Islands)
Saint Martin	80.44	76.99	83.96	6.98	79.73	0.35	80.08	0.01	80.08	0.12	80.21	0.03	80.24	−0.01	80.22	0.21	80.44	0.36	(Collectivity of Saint Martin)
Panama	79.78	76.88	82.71	5.83	77.36	1.15	78.51	−2.18	76.33	0.67	77.00	2.32	79.32	0.27	79.59	0.18	79.78	1.26	(Panama)
USA	78.89	76.50	81.40	4.90	78.84	−0.05	78.79	−1.81	76.98	−0.65	76.33	1.10	77.43	0.95	78.39	0.50	78.89	0.10	(United States)
Cuba	78.26	75.86	80.68	4.82	77.83	−0.41	77.41	−0.01	77.41	−4.21	73.20	4.43	77.63	0.46	78.08	0.18	78.26	0.85	(Cuba)
Turks and Caicos Islands	78.18	76.01	80.45	4.44	77.21	0.48	77.69	−0.19	77.50	−0.27	77.23	0.68	77.92	0.09	78.01	0.17	78.18	0.49	(Turks and Caicos Islands)
Antigua and Barbuda	77.77	74.74	80.45	5.70	76.91	0.26	77.17	−0.01	77.16	0.04	77.20	0.29	77.48	0.11	77.60	0.17	77.77	0.60	(Antigua and Barbuda)
British Virgin Islands	77.43	74.70	80.19	5.49	76.53	0.32	76.84	0.05	76.89	−1.60	75.30	1.88	77.18	0.10	77.28	0.16	77.43	0.59	(British Virgin Islands)
Curacao	76.99	72.66	80.96	8.30	76.38	0.11	76.49	0.01	76.50	−0.81	75.69	1.04	76.73	0.07	76.80	0.19	76.99	0.50	(Curaçao)
Sint Maarten	76.53	73.85	79.66	5.81	75.73	−0.05	75.68	−0.68	75.00	−0.50	74.50	1.68	76.18	0.19	76.37	0.16	76.53	0.85	(Sint Maarten)
Aruba	76.50	73.84	78.92	5.07	75.26	0.76	76.02	−0.61	75.41	−1.75	73.66	2.57	76.23	0.13	76.35	0.15	76.50	0.48	(Aruba)
Barbados	76.33	73.75	78.76	5.01	75.93	0.57	76.50	0.15	76.65	−0.07	76.58	−0.90	75.68	0.50	76.18	0.15	76.33	−0.16	(Barbados)
Grenada	75.37	72.52	78.50	5.98	75.05	−0.07	74.97	0.05	75.02	−0.50	74.52	0.63	75.15	0.05	75.20	0.16	75.37	0.40	(Grenada)
Mexico	75.26	72.44	78.00	5.56	74.40	0.13	74.53	−4.08	70.45	−0.70	69.75	4.22	73.97	1.10	75.07	0.19	75.26	0.73	(Mexico)
Nicaragua	75.10	72.46	77.58	5.11	72.79	0.97	73.76	−3.00	70.77	−0.29	70.48	3.98	74.46	0.48	74.95	0.15	75.10	1.34	(Nicaragua)
Bahamas	74.71	71.06	78.33	7.27	74.03	−2.62	71.41	1.59	72.99	−2.24	70.75	3.74	74.49	0.06	74.55	0.16	74.71	3.30	(The Bahamas)
Dominican Republic	73.87	70.66	77.11	6.44	73.14	−0.03	73.11	−0.48	72.64	−0.88	71.76	2.45	74.21	−0.49	73.72	0.15	73.87	0.76	(Dominican Republic)
Belize	73.74	71.08	76.66	5.58	71.44	1.14	72.58	−1.00	71.58	−0.66	70.92	1.27	72.19	1.38	73.57	0.17	73.74	1.16	(Belize)
Trinidad and Tobago	73.62	70.51	76.83	6.32	72.90	−0.06	72.84	−0.19	72.64	−1.53	71.11	2.22	73.33	0.16	73.49	0.13	73.62	0.78	(Trinidad and Tobago)
World	73.48	71.11	75.97	4.86	71.78	1.09	72.87	−0.69	72.18	−0.97	71.21	1.75	72.97	0.36	73.33	0.15	73.48	0.61	
Caribbean small states	73.31	70.12	76.60	6.48	71.77	0.36	72.13	−0.19	71.94	−2.02	69.92	2.91	72.83	0.34	73.17	0.14	73.31	1.18	
Honduras	73.04	70.49	75.67	5.18	71.03	1.09	72.12	−1.26	70.86	−1.37	69.49	3.22	72.72	0.17	72.88	0.16	73.04	0.92	(Honduras)
St. Lucia	72.85	69.45	76.45	7.00	72.68	−0.43	72.25	0.06	72.31	−3.19	69.12	3.55	72.67	0.03	72.70	0.15	72.85	0.60	(Saint Lucia)
Guatemala	72.75	70.44	75.04	4.60	70.94	0.70	71.64	−1.67	69.97	−2.11	67.86	3.35	71.21	1.40	72.60	0.14	72.75	1.11	(Guatemala)
El Salvador	72.30	67.76	76.49	8.73	71.14	0.58	71.72	−1.48	70.24	−0.30	69.94	2.03	71.97	0.13	72.10	0.20	72.30	0.58	(El Salvador)
St. Kitts and Nevis	72.28	68.69	76.16	7.47	71.23	0.31	71.54	−0.36	71.18	−1.91	69.27	1.04	70.31	1.83	72.14	0.14	72.28	0.74	(Saint Kitts and Nevis)
Jamaica	71.61	69.08	74.15	5.07	72.36	−0.83	71.53	−0.08	71.45	−2.37	69.08	2.40	71.48	0.00	71.48	0.13	71.61	0.07	(Jamaica)
St. Vincent and the Grenadines	71.38	68.78	74.48	5.69	70.36	0.64	70.99	−1.39	69.61	−0.47	69.13	2.06	71.19	0.04	71.23	0.15	71.38	0.39	(Saint Vincent and the Grenadines)
Dominica	71.29	68.35	74.72	6.37	71.19	0.12	71.31	−0.04	71.27	−1.44	69.83	1.25	71.08	0.05	71.13	0.16	71.29	−0.01	(Dominica)
Greenland	70.27	68.41	72.23	3.82	70.51	0.90	71.41	−0.12	71.29	−0.02	71.26	−0.03	71.23	−0.26	70.97	−0.70	70.27	−1.14	(Greenland)
Haiti	65.12	61.90	68.49	6.59	62.97	1.36	64.33	−0.55	63.77	−1.16	62.61	1.34	63.95	0.99	64.94	0.18	65.12	0.79	(Haiti)

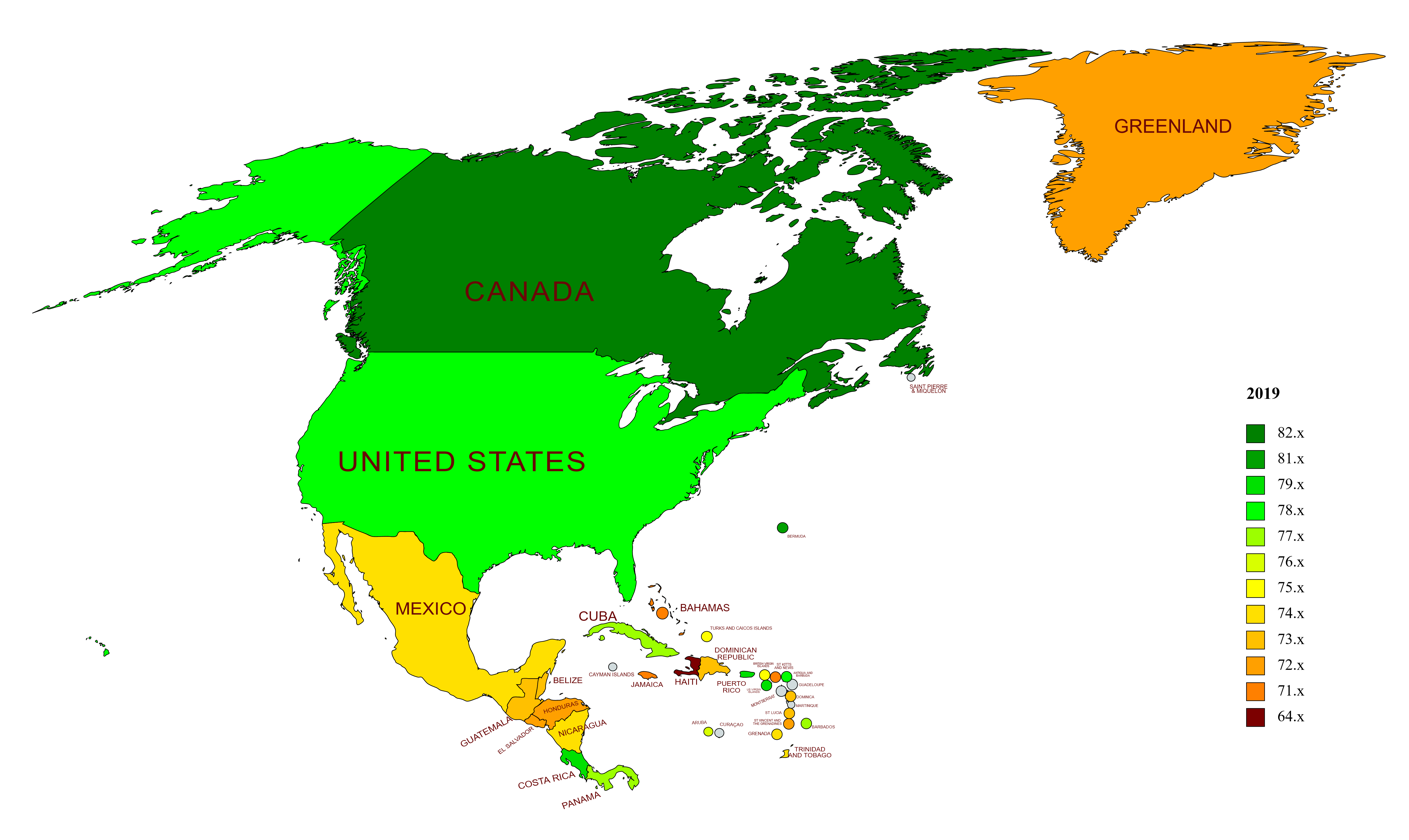
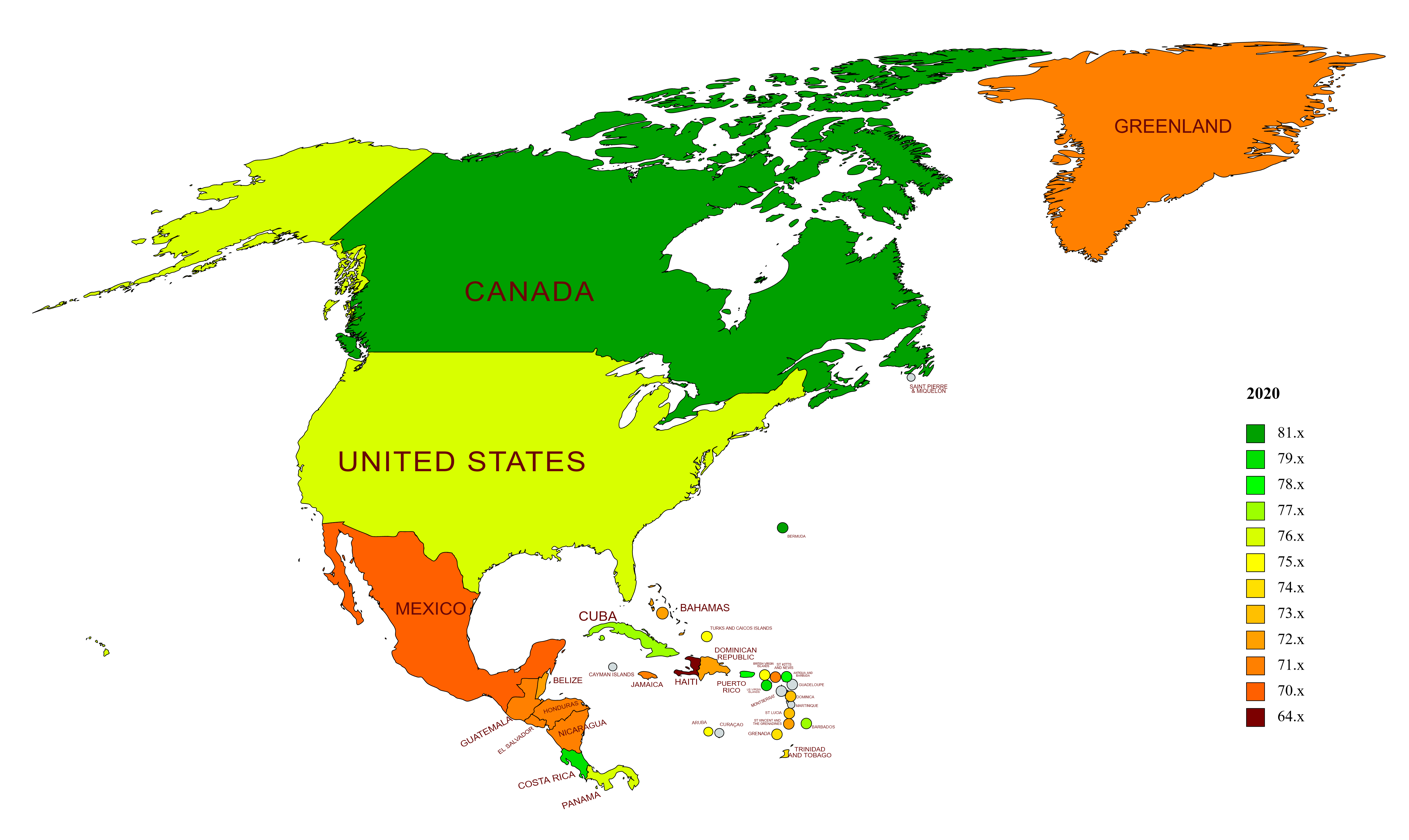
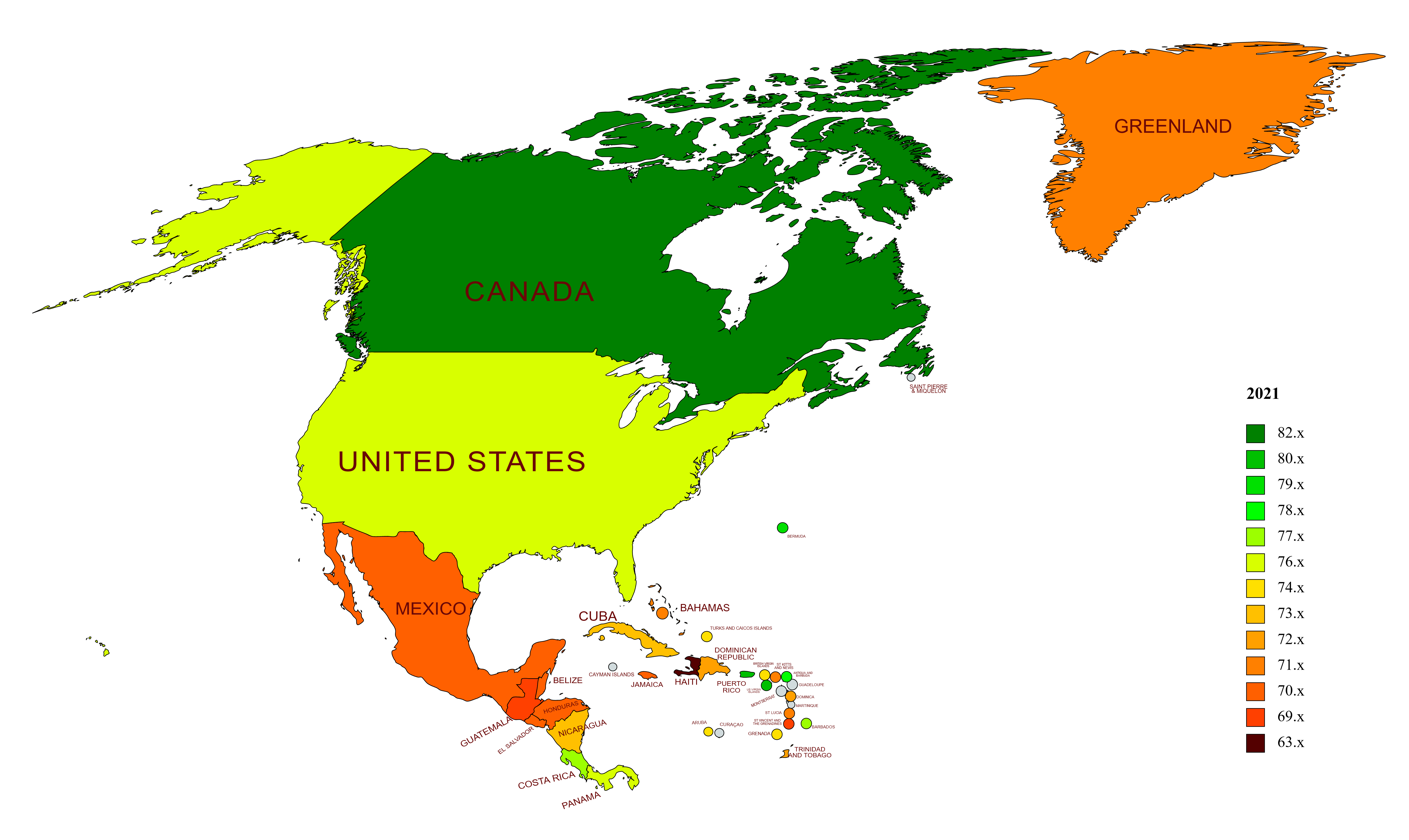
Change in life expectancy in North America from 2019 to 2021

== WHO (2019) ==
Estimation of the World Health Organization for 2019.

World Health Organization (2019)
Countries	Life expectancy at birth					HALE at birth					Life expectancy at age 60					HALE at age 60					
Countries	All	M	F	FΔM	Δ 2000	All	M	F	FΔM	Δ 2000	All	M	F	FΔM	Δ 2000	All	M	F	FΔM	Δ 2000	
Canada	82.02	80.12	83.90	3.78	2.93	70.30	69.66	70.91	1.25	1.76	24.99	23.66	26.23	2.57	2.52	18.66	17.89	19.38	1.49	1.58	(Canada)
Puerto Rico	80.50	76.86	84.04	7.18	4.25	69.44	67.20	71.62	4.42	3.24	25.32	23.46	26.98	3.52	3.21	19.07	17.74	20.26	2.52	2.17	(Puerto Rico)
Costa Rica	80.30	77.93	82.71	4.78	2.13	69.21	68.09	70.35	2.26	1.38	24.52	23.11	25.85	2.74	1.97	18.37	17.49	19.20	1.71	1.25	(Costa Rica)
Panama	78.97	76.20	81.86	5.66	2.82	68.31	66.89	69.79	2.90	2.06	23.98	22.14	25.80	3.66	1.85	18.08	16.88	19.26	2.38	1.18	(Panama)
Nicaragua	78.87	76.30	81.27	4.97	2.69	67.68	66.26	69.00	2.74	2.39	24.50	23.23	25.51	2.28	0.46	18.19	17.38	18.83	1.45	0.22	(Nicaragua)
USA	78.74	76.53	80.98	4.45	2.08	66.02	65.13	66.93	1.80	0.70	23.24	21.99	24.41	2.42	1.90	16.59	15.82	17.31	1.49	0.92	(United States)
Cuba	77.66	75.30	80.12	4.82	0.91	67.80	66.74	68.88	2.14	0.78	21.57	19.96	23.15	3.19	−0.04	16.55	15.53	17.55	2.02	−0.17	(Cuba)
Americas	77.07	74.42	79.76	5.34	2.98	65.76	64.51	67.01	2.50	2.19	22.64	21.23	23.92	2.69	1.62	16.61	15.74	17.40	1.66	0.96	
Saint Lucia	76.12	72.53	79.93	7.40	2.90	65.71	63.71	67.84	4.13	2.18	22.16	19.63	24.67	5.04	2.18	16.73	14.96	18.49	3.53	1.51	(Saint Lucia)
Barbados	76.04	74.33	77.61	3.28	1.43	66.29	65.76	66.76	1.00	1.00	20.94	19.97	21.74	1.77	0.30	16.07	15.48	16.56	1.08	0.05	(Barbados)
Mexico	75.83	72.80	78.89	6.09	1.61	65.46	63.92	67.02	3.10	1.36	22.20	21.03	23.30	2.27	0.76	16.53	15.86	17.16	1.30	0.60	(Mexico)
Antigua and Barbuda	75.66	74.05	77.07	3.02	1.27	65.78	65.16	66.31	1.15	0.89	20.14	19.28	20.79	1.51	0.20	15.35	14.74	15.80	1.06	−0.04	(Antigua and Barbuda)
Belize	74.87	72.55	77.38	4.83	4.77	65.19	64.05	66.45	2.40	3.59	21.69	20.81	22.65	1.84	3.17	16.68	16.13	17.28	1.15	2.17	(Belize)
El Salvador	74.28	69.48	78.73	9.25	2.63	64.39	60.89	67.62	6.73	2.37	22.01	20.20	23.48	3.28	1.18	16.68	15.34	17.77	2.43	0.74	(El Salvador)
Trinidad and Tobago	74.09	70.71	77.54	6.83	3.67	64.07	62.06	66.11	4.05	2.68	21.44	19.58	23.05	3.47	2.60	16.17	14.85	17.31	2.46	1.73	(Trinidad and Tobago)
Dominican Republic	73.91	70.87	77.18	6.31	0.51	64.14	62.41	66.01	3.60	0.38	22.60	21.24	23.94	2.70	0.11	17.23	16.31	18.13	1.82	−0.09	(Dominican Republic)
World	73.12	70.61	75.70	5.09	6.35	63.45	62.33	64.59	2.26	5.33	21.03	19.41	22.54	3.13	2.16	15.80	14.87	16.67	1.80	1.52	
St. Vincent and the Grenadines	73.11	70.76	75.82	5.06	1.45	63.49	62.21	64.98	2.77	0.95	20.51	19.45	21.71	2.26	1.05	15.52	14.74	16.39	1.65	0.58	(Saint Vincent and the Grenadines)
Grenada	72.73	70.46	75.32	4.86	1.14	63.36	62.26	64.67	2.41	0.72	18.39	16.72	20.26	3.54	0.95	14.05	12.87	15.37	2.50	0.56	(Grenada)
Guatemala	72.71	70.19	75.20	5.01	4.40	62.54	61.18	63.88	2.70	3.84	20.65	19.76	21.45	1.69	0.89	15.39	14.84	15.89	1.05	0.51	(Guatemala)
Jamaica	72.24	69.48	75.14	5.66	−0.01	63.55	62.11	65.08	2.97	−0.06	18.66	16.94	20.39	3.45	0.04	14.57	13.37	15.78	2.41	−0.06	(Jamaica)
Honduras	71.44	69.99	72.90	2.91	1.68	62.35	61.85	62.85	1.00	1.60	18.13	17.36	18.84	1.48	−1.17	13.76	13.26	14.23	0.97	−0.96	(Honduras)
Bahamas	70.74	68.08	73.26	5.18	−0.23	61.78	60.38	63.11	2.73	−0.44	20.20	18.68	21.50	2.82	0.15	15.54	14.48	16.44	1.96	−0.04	(The Bahamas)
Haiti	63.66	63.18	64.16	0.98	6.93	55.00	55.56	54.47	−1.09	5.84	16.25	16.28	16.24	−0.04	1.06	12.35	12.54	12.20	−0.34	0.70	(Haiti)

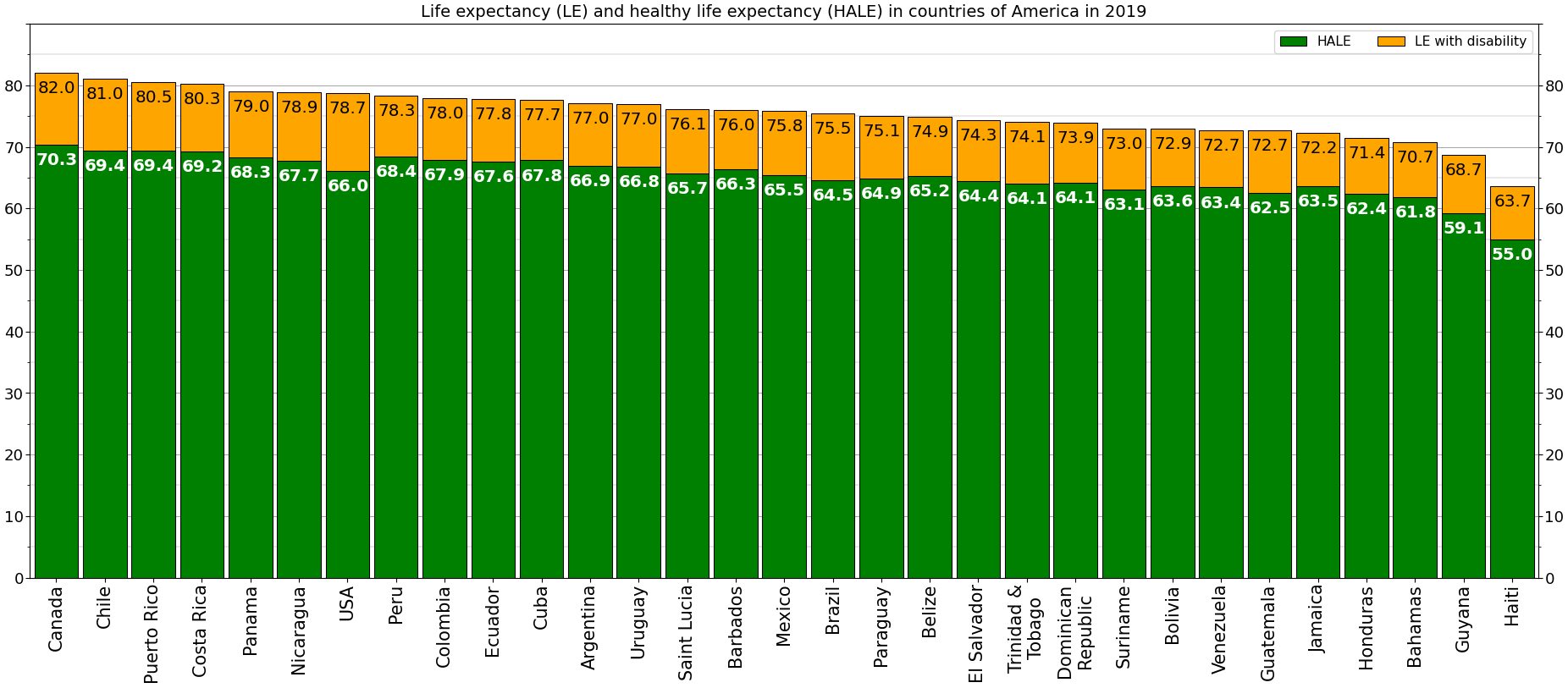
Life expectancy and HALE in countries of America in 2019

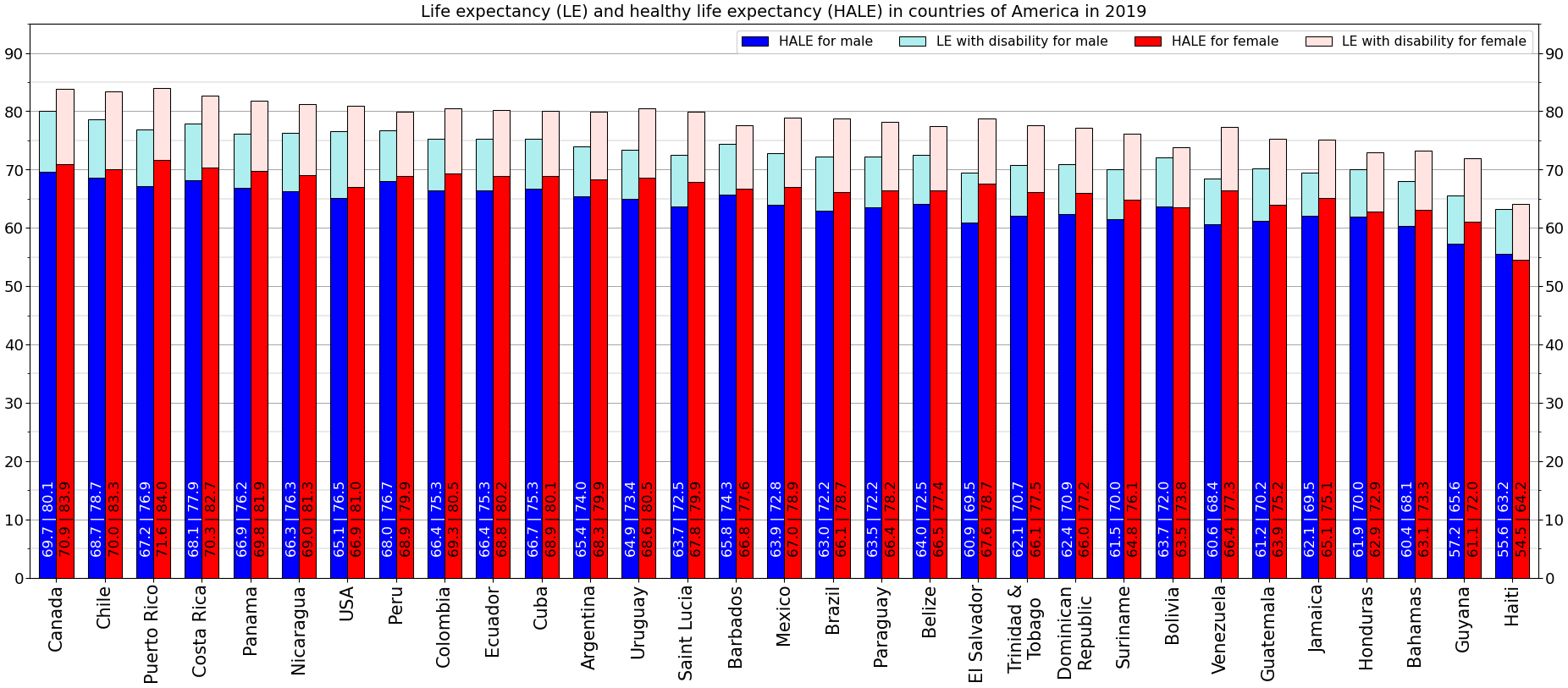
Elaboration by sex

Interactive chart of male and female life expectancy in America as defined by WHO for 2019. Open the original chart and hover over chart elements. The squares of bubbles are proportional to population according to estimation of the UN for 2019.

== Charts ==
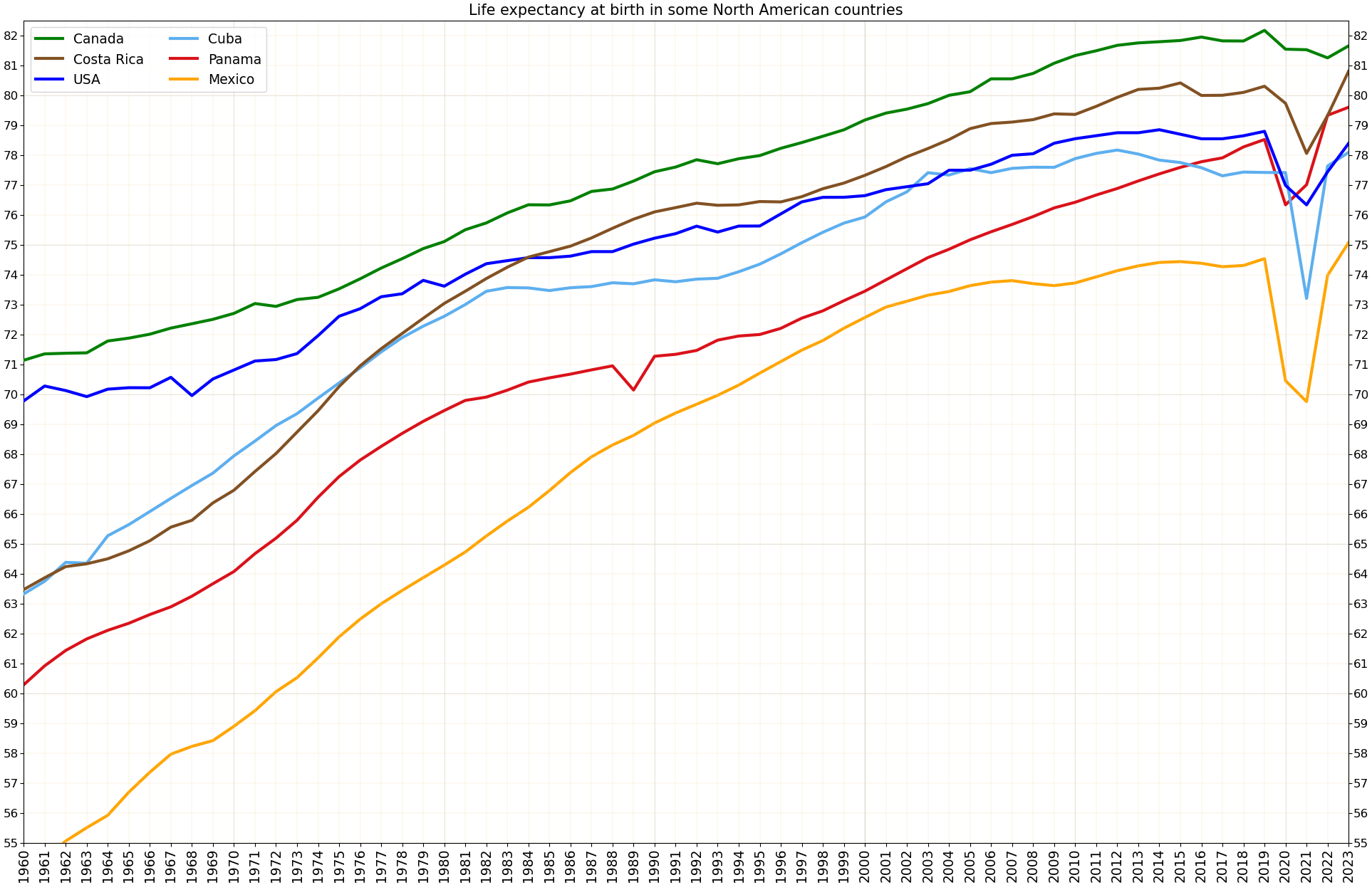
Comparison of life expectancy in some countries of North America since 1960

Development of life expectancy in the United States and Canada since 1831
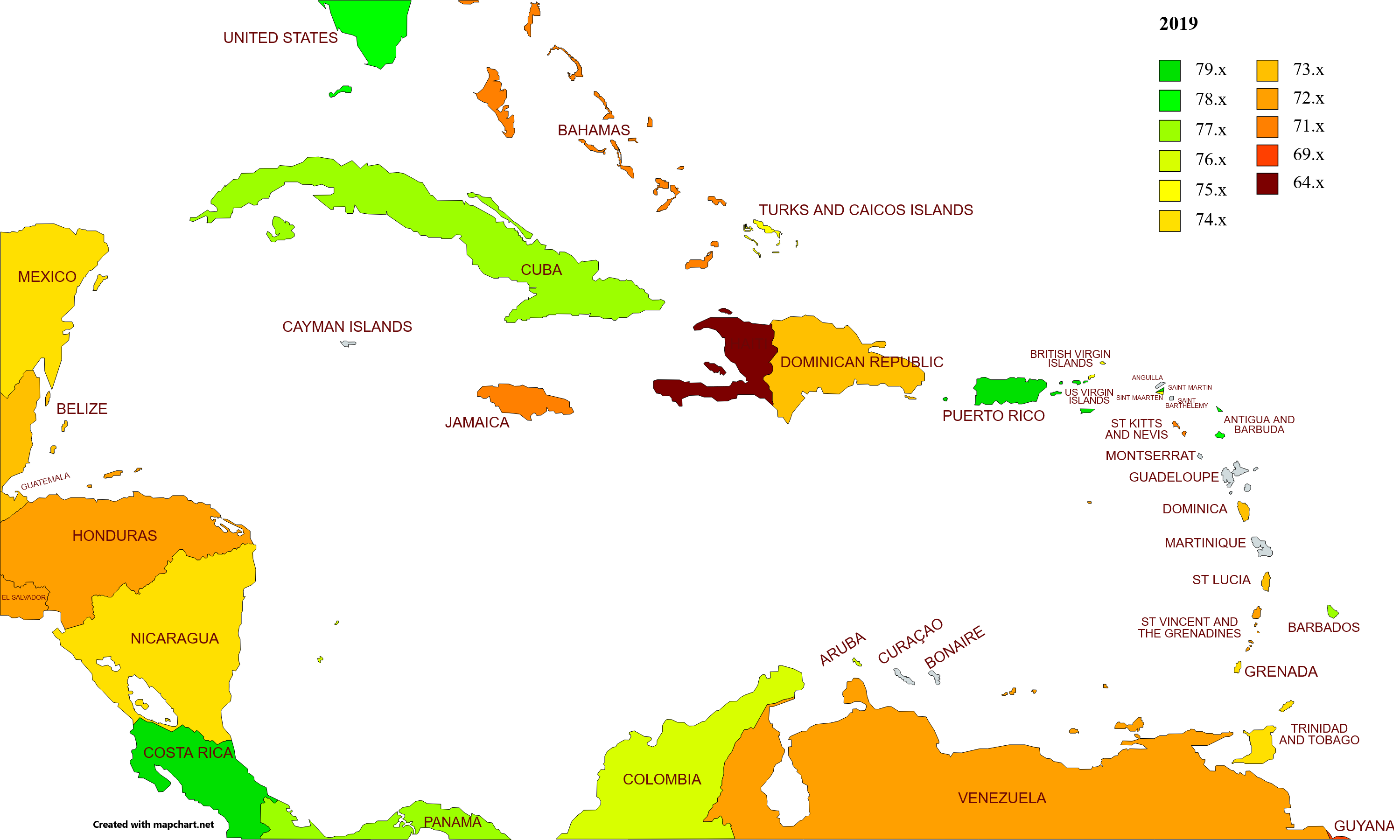
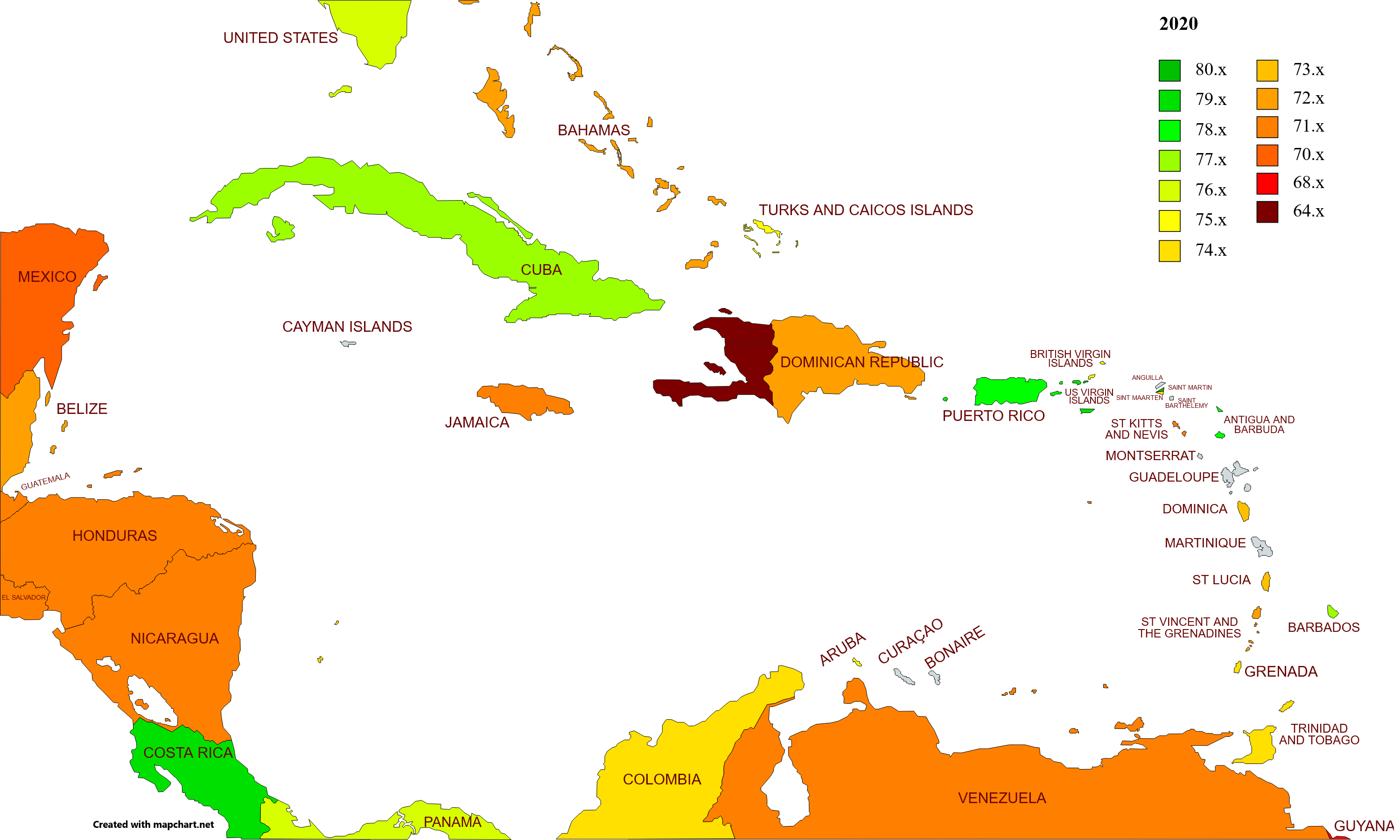
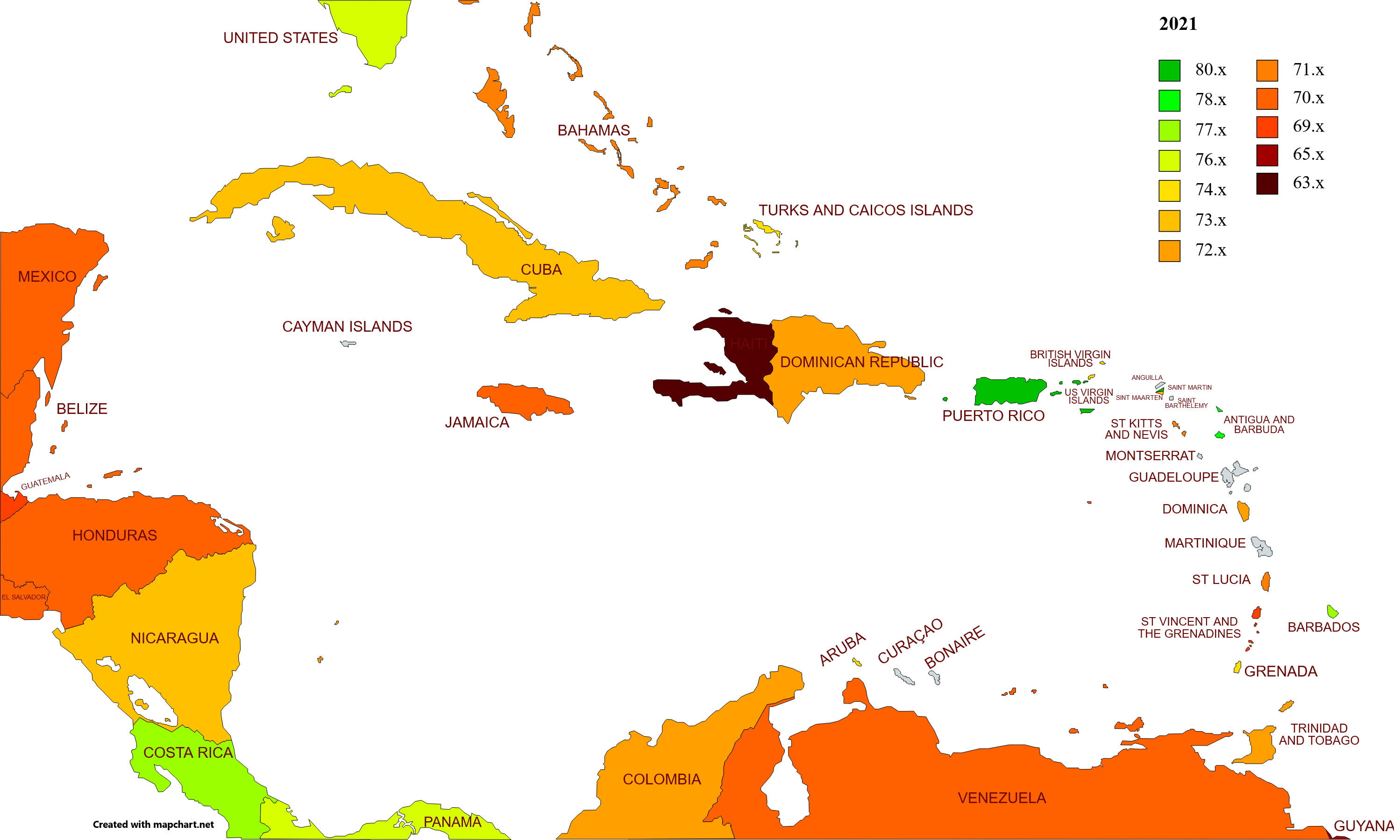
Change in life expectancy in the Caribbean from 2019 to 2021
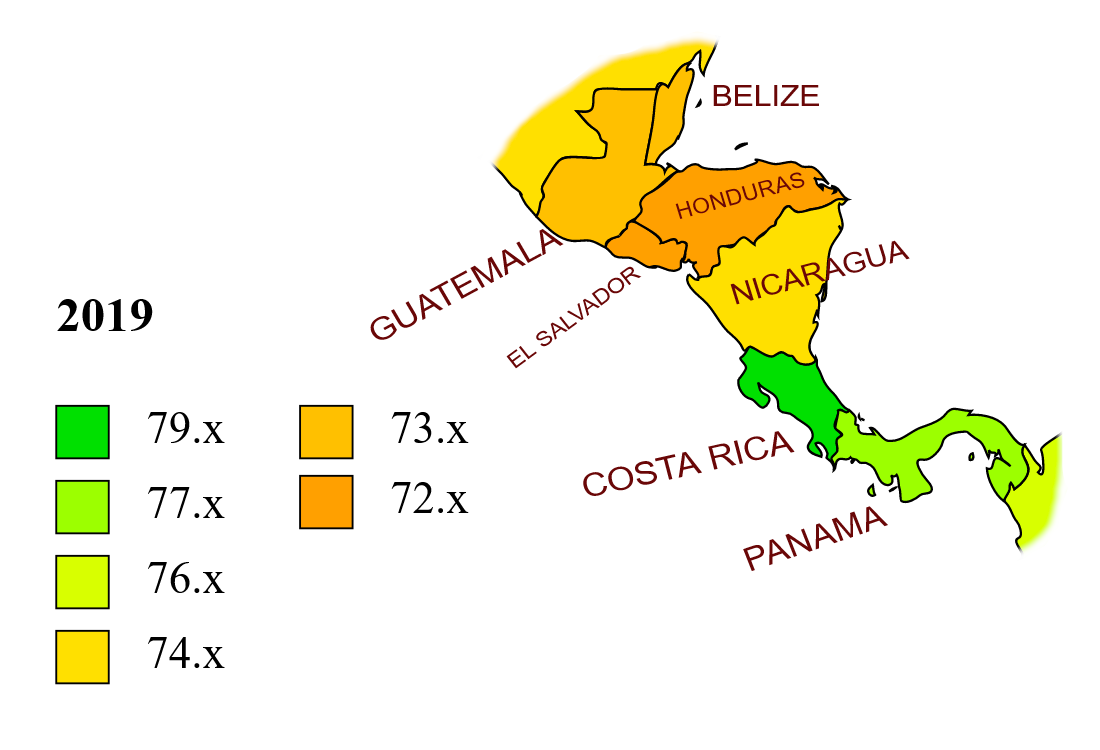
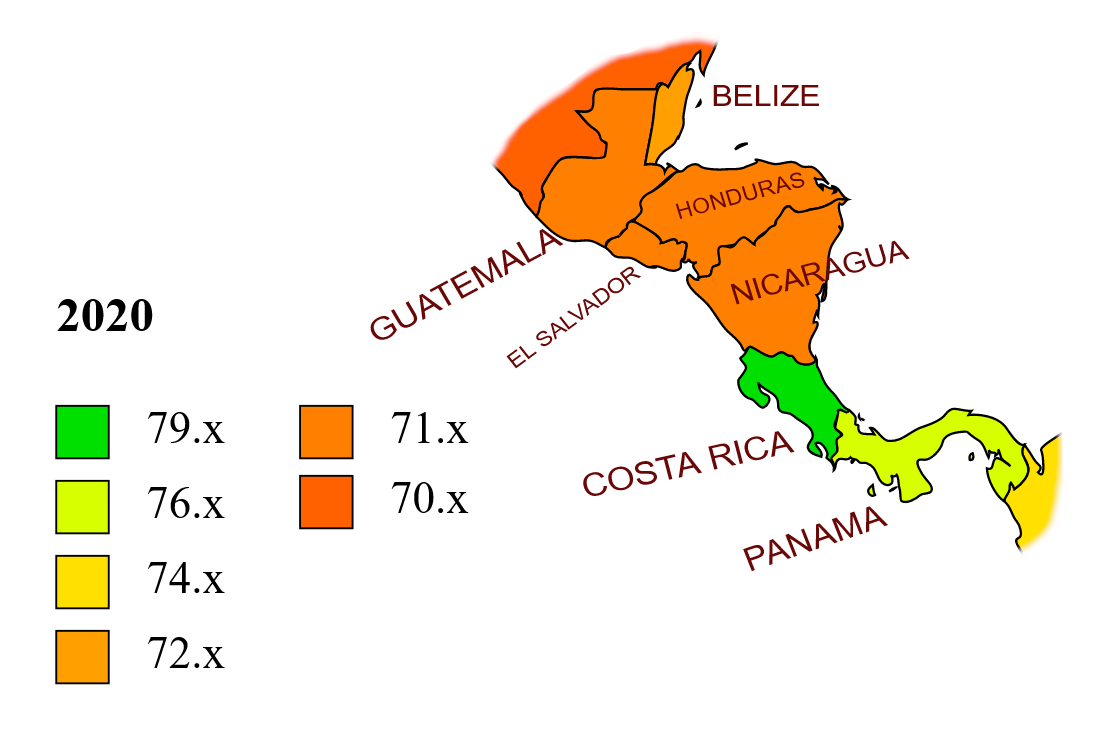
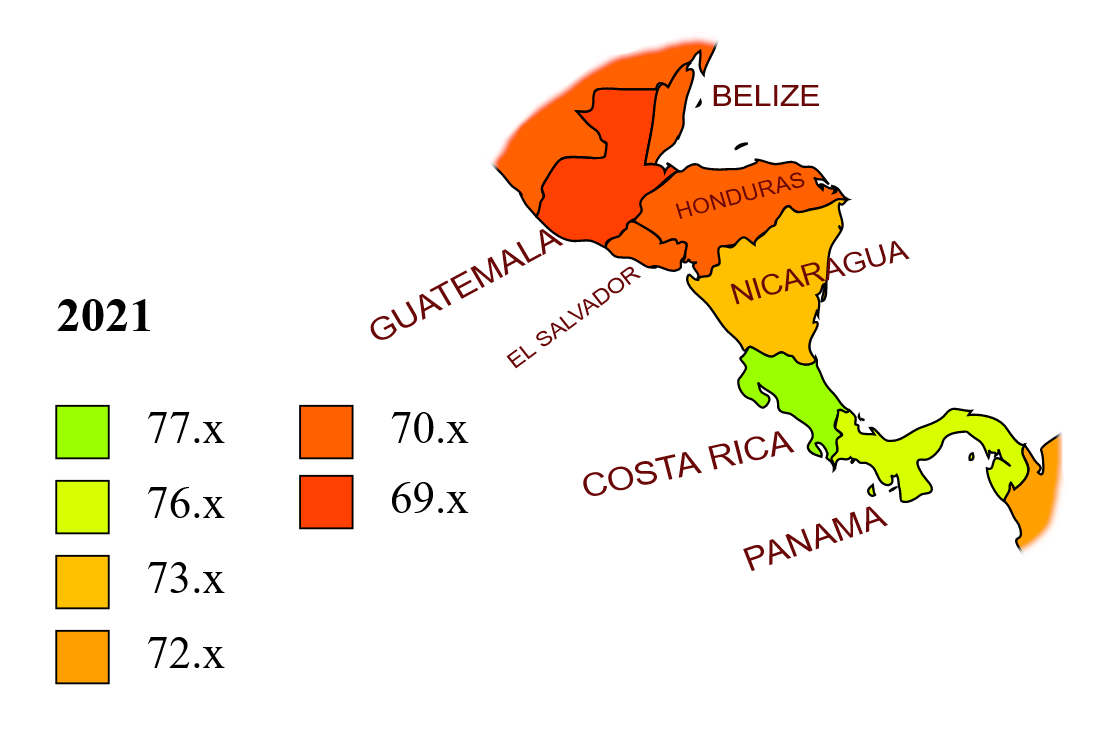
Change in life expectancy in Central America from 2019 to 2021

== See also ==
- List of countries by life expectancy
- List of countries in the Americas by life expectancy
- List of Caribbean countries by life expectancy
- List of Central American countries by life expectancy
- List of Canadian provinces and territories by life expectancy
- List of Mexican states by life expectancy
- List of U.S. states and territories by life expectancy
- List of U.S. counties with longest life expectancy
- List of U.S. counties with shortest life expectancy
- List of U.S. congressional districts by life expectancy
- List of U.S. states by changes in life expectancy, 1985–2010
- List of oldest people
- Longevity
- Life extension
