= List of U.S. counties with shortest life expectancy =

This list of U.S. counties with shortest life expectancy includes 50 counties, or county equivalents, out of a grand total of 3,142 counties or county equivalents in the United States. With the exception of one city (Baltimore), the counties with shortest life expectancy at birth have a largely rural population. The counties listed include 24 with a population consisting of more than 50 percent of non-Hispanic whites, 18 with a population consisting of more than 50 percent of African Americans, and 8 with a population consisting of more than 50 percent of Native Americans.

The U.S. states represented on the list are Kentucky (fourteen counties); Mississippi (eight counties); Alabama and South Dakota (five counties each); Arkansas, Louisiana, and West Virginia (three counties each); Missouri (two counties), and Alaska, Florida, Maryland, Montana, North Dakota, South Carolina, and Tennessee (one county each).

The fourteen counties in Kentucky on the list are located in the Eastern Kentucky Coalfield, a region with an economy formerly dominated by coal mining. The three counties in West Virginia on the list also have economies formerly dominated by coal. The population of these counties consists largely of non-Hispanic whites.

The eight counties on the list in Mississippi are located mostly in the Mississippi Delta, a region heavily populated by African Americans.

== Dynamics ==
The 50 listed counties have a life expectancy at birth of 6 to 12 years less than the average life expectancy of the United States. Ten of the counties on the list, 9 of them with majority non-Hispanic white populations, experienced declines in life expectancy between 1980 and 2014.

There is a wide range in life expectancy among counties in the US. The residents of Summit County, Colorado live an average of 86.83 years. The residents of Oglala Lakota County (formerly Shannon County) of South Dakota live an average of 66.81 years – twenty years less. Moreover, the gap between the counties with the longest life expectancy and the shortest is widening. Life expectancy in the US as a whole increased by more than 5 years between 1980 and 2014. The life expectancy of most of the longest-lived counties equaled or exceeded that increase. The life expectancy of most of the shortest-lived counties increased less than 5 years – and in a few counties life expectancy decreased.

A study published in the Journal of the American Medical Association in 2016 concluded that income was a major component of the difference in life expectancy in states, counties, races, and regions of the U.S. Men in the richest one percent of the population lived 15 years longer than men in the poorest one percent of the population. Women in the richest one percent of the population lived 10 years longer.

Counties with small populations, and therefore small numbers of deaths, have a larger margin of error in determining life expectancy than counties with larger populations.

== List ==
U.S. counties (and county equivalents) with shortest life expectancy from birth: 1980 and 2014
No.	County and state	Life expectancy (years)		Majority population 2014 (%)	Other factors
No.	County and state	2014	1980	Majority population 2014 (%)	Other factors
1.	Oglala Lakota County (Shannon County), South Dakota	66.81	61.25	Native American: 92.9%	The county lies entirely within the Pine Ridge Indian Reservation.
2.	Union County, Florida	67.57	65.84	Non-Hispanic White: 70.7%	Large prison population
3.	Todd County, South Dakota	68.52	63.62	Native American: 86.5%	The county lies entirely within the Rosebud Indian Reservation.
4.	Sioux County, North Dakota	68.59	66.01	Native American: 82.0%	The county lies entirely within the Standing Rock Indian Reservation
5.	Buffalo County, South Dakota	69.05	64.49	Native American: 79.4%	The Crow Creek Indian Reservation makes up the majority of Buffalo County.
6.	Owsley County, Kentucky	70.21	72.41	Non-Hispanic White: 97.9%	Poorest county in the nation, 2010 per capita income was $10,742; declining life expectancy
7.	Breathitt County, Kentucky	70.22	71.24	Non-Hispanic White: 97.5%	As of 2014 had the highest morbidity rate in the state; declining life expectancy
8.	McDowell County, West Virginia	70.27	69.22	Non-Hispanic White: 89.0%	High rates of drug abuse and poverty
9.	Perry County, Kentucky	70.60	71.17	Non-Hispanic White: 95.9%	High rates of smoking and obesity and a low level of physical activity; declining life expectancy
10.	Tunica County, Mississippi	70.93	68.06	African American: 75.1%	
11.	Holmes County, Mississippi	71.01	69.42	African American: 82.9%	
12.	Dewey County, South Dakota	71.02	68.47	Native American: 72.9%	Most of county lies in the Cheyenne River Indian Reservation.
13.	Coahoma County, Mississippi	71.14	68.99	African American: 75.1%	
14.	Leslie County, Kentucky	71.17	72.55	Non-Hispanic White: 98.2%	Declining life expectancy
15.	Roosevelt County, Montana	71.20	69.92	Native Americans: 60.4%	
16.	Kusilvak Census Area, Alaska	70.83	66.51	Native Americans: 96.93%	
17.	Wolfe County, Kentucky	71.15	71.10	Non-Hispanic White: 98.0%	
18.	Phillips County, Arkansas	71.28	68.98	African American: 62.0%	
19.	Mingo County, West Virginia	71.38	69.39	Non-Hispanic White: 96.2%	
20.	Harlan County, Kentucky	71.47	70.84	Non-Hispanic White: 95.3%	
21.	Madison Parish, Louisiana	71.57	69.94	African American: 62.2%	
21.	Walker County, Alabama	71.57	71.79	Non-Hispanic White: 91.6%	Declining life expectancy
23.	Powell County, Kentucky	71.60	73.41	Non-Hispanic White: 96.8%	Declining life expectancy
24.	Lee County, Kentucky	71.61	73.06	Non-Hispanic White: 96.0%	Declining life expectancy
24.	Sunflower County, Mississippi	71.61	70.43	African American: 72.8%	
26.	Bolivar County, Mississippi	71.72	69.30	African American: 64.7%	
27.	Clay County, Kentucky	71.78	73.75	Non-Hispanic White: 92.6%	Declining life expectancy
28.	Washington County, Mississippi	71.81	69.58	African American: 72.3%	
29.	Humphreys County, Mississippi	71.90	68.85	African American: 74.7%	
30.	Floyd County, Kentucky	71.97	71.82	Non-Hispanic White: 98.0%	
31.	Marlboro County, South Carolina	72.02	69.28	African American: 51.2%	
32.	Pemiscot County, Missouri	72.04	69.61	Non-Hispanic White: 69.2%	
33.	Corson County, South Dakota	72.13	68.82	Native American: 64.8%	
34.	Baltimore City, Maryland	72.14	67.60	African American: 63.3%	
34.	Poinsett County, Arkansas	72.14	71.33	Non-Hispanic White: 87.8%	
36.	East Carroll Parish, Louisiana	72.17	69.91	African American: 68.0%	
37.	Wilcox County, Alabama	72.21	70.41	African American: 71.2%	
38.	Logan County, West Virginia	72.22	70.66	Non-Hispanic White: 95.9%	
39.	Perry County, Alabama	72.31	72.71	African American: 67.6%	Declining life expectancy
39.	Crittenden County, Arkansas	72.31	69.57	African American: 51.5%	
41.	Letcher County, Kentucky	72.35	71.62	Non-Hispanic White 97.9%	
42.	Wilkinson County, Mississippi	72.38	69.42	African American 70.0%	
43.	Dallas County, Alabama	72.39	70.77	African American: 69.6%	
44.	Pike County, Kentucky	72.41	71.59	Non-Hispanic White: 97.3%	
45.	Grundy County, Tennessee	72.46	72.72	Non-Hispanic White: 96.6%	Declining life expectancy
46.	Lowndes County, Alabama	72.57	70.62	African American: 73.1%	
47.	Whitley County, Kentucky	72.59	71.08	Non-Hispanic White: 97.1%	
48.	Magoffin County, Kentucky	72.60	71.93	Non-Hispanic White: 98.0%	
49.	Dunklin County, Missouri	72.62	71.78	Non-Hispanic White: 81.4%	
50.	East Feliciana Parish, Louisiana	72.64	72.39	Non-Hispanic White: 53.5%	
	United States (all)	79.08	73.75	Non-Hispanic White: 62.1%	

== See also ==
- List of U.S. states and territories by life expectancy
- List of U.S. counties with longest life expectancy
- List of U.S. states by changes in life expectancy, 1985–2010
- List of U.S. congressional districts by life expectancy
- List of North American countries by life expectancy
- Opioid epidemic in the United States
- Health of Native Americans in the United States
