= List of U.S. counties with longest life expectancy =

This list of U.S. counties with longest life expectancy includes 51 counties, and county equivalents, out of a grand total of 3,142 counties or county equivalents in the United States. Most of the counties where people live longest are either sparsely populated or well-to-do suburbs of large cities. Forty-seven of the counties listed have a population of which the largest racial component is non-Hispanic whites. Two have populations of which Hispanics are the majority. Asian Americans make up the largest component of two counties.

Counties with the longest life expectancy are located in 21 states: Colorado (eleven); California and Iowa (five each); Nebraska (four); North Dakota, Virginia, and Minnesota (three each); Alaska, New York, and New Jersey (two each), and Texas, New Mexico, Wyoming, Florida, Michigan, South Dakota, Idaho, Maryland, Utah, Wisconsin, and Oregon (one each).

The residents of three adjacent counties in the high-elevation Rocky Mountains of Colorado have the longest life expectancy.

== Dynamics ==
Among all the counties in the US, there is a wide range in life expectancy from birth. The residents of Summit County, Colorado, live the longest with a life expectancy of 86.83 years. The residents of Oglala Lakota County (formerly Shannon County) of South Dakota live the shortest, with a life expectancy of 66.81 years—twenty years less.

The gap between the counties with the longest life expectancy and the shortest is widening. US life expectancy increased by more than 5 years between 1980 and 2014. The life expectancy of most of the longest-lived counties equaled or exceeded that increase. The life expectancy of most of the shortest-lived counties increased less than 5 years—and in a few counties, especially in Kentucky, life expectancy decreased.

A study published in the Journal of the American Medical Association in 2016 concluded that income was a major component of the difference in life expectancy in states, counties, races, and regions of the U.S. Men in the richest one percent of the population lived 15 years longer than men in the poorest one percent of the population and women in the richest one percent of the population lived 10 years longer.

== Top 51 counties in 2014 ==
U.S. counties (and county equivalents) with longest life expectancy from birth: 2014 and 1980
County and state	2014 life expectancy (years)	1980 life expectancy (years)	Plurality population in 2014 (%)	Other factors
1. Summit County, Colorado	86.83	79.18	Non-Hispanic White: 82.6%	
2. Pitkin County, Colorado	86.52	78.81	Non-Hispanic White: 86.5%	
3. Eagle County, Colorado	85.94	77.21	Non-Hispanic White: 67.4%	
4. Billings County, North Dakota	84.04	79.44	Non-Hispanic White: 96.6%	Population < 1,000.
5. Marin County, California	83.80	75.66	Non-Hispanic White: 72.6%	
6. San Miguel County, Colorado	83.73	77.58	Non-Hispanic White: 87.4%	
7. Fairfax County, Virginia (and city)	83.73	76.65	Non-Hispanic White: 52.7%	Fairfax City 60.3% White
7. Aleutians West Census Area, Alaska	83.73	70.77	Asian: 31.1%	
7. Aleutians East Borough, Alaska	83.73	70.77	Asian: 41.4%	
10. Presidio County, Texas	83.72	75.27	Hispanic: 82.0%	
10. Douglas County, Colorado	83.72	76.89	Non-Hispanic White: 95.9%	
12. Hinsdale County, Colorado	83.66	76.76	Non-Hispanic White: 92.5%	Population < 1,000.
13. Los Alamos County, New Mexico	83.49	78.22	Hispanic: 51.1%	
14. Teton County, Wyoming	83.46	76.35	Non-Hispanic White: 80.7%	
15. Collier County, Florida	83.43	74.48	Non-Hispanic White: 64.8%	
16. Loudoun County, Virginia	83.19	73.98	Non-Hispanic White: 60.1%	
17. Santa Clara County, California	83.14	75.80	Non-Hispanic White: 58.6%	
18. San Mateo County, California	83.11	75.67	Non-Hispanic White: 41.1%	
19. Leelanau County, Michigan	83.10	75.99	Non-Hispanic White: 90.8%	
20. Lincoln County, South Dakota	83.03	77.24	Non-Hispanic White: 93.9%	
21. Ouray County, Colorado	83.00	76.48	Non-Hispanic White: 92.5%	
22. Blaine County, Idaho	82.99	76.84	Non-Hispanic White: 77.6%	
23. Howard County, Maryland	82.98	75.18	Non-Hispanic White: 58.6%	
24. Mono County, California	82.96	76.06	Non-Hispanic White: 66.3%	
25. Sioux County, Iowa	82.86	78.16	Non-Hispanic White: 91.6%	
26. Wayne County, Nebraska	82.82	77.66	Non-Hispanic White: 90.6%	
27. Carver County, Minnesota	82.80	76.67	Non-Hispanic White: 90.1%	
28. Arlington County, Virginia	82.76	78.16	Non-Hispanic White: 63.6%	
29. Grand County, Colorado	82.73	75.61	Non-Hispanic White: 89.0%	
29. Routt County, Colorado	82.73	73.89	Non-Hispanic White: 90.3%	
31. Winneshiek County, Iowa	82.62	77.23	Non-Hispanic White: 95.2%	
32. Sioux County, Nebraska	82.57	76.37	Non-Hispanic White: 93.1%	Population < 2,000.
33. Rockland County, New York	82.54	74.67	Non-Hispanic White: 63.9%	
34. Bergen County, New Jersey	82.47	75.27	Non-Hispanic White: 59.7%	
35. Hunterdon County, New Jersey	82.45	75.70	Non-Hispanic White: 86.9%	
36. Sheridan County, North Dakota	82.44	77.54	Non-Hispanic White: 95.4%	Population < 2,000.
37. McPherson County, Nebraska	82.41	76.47	Non-Hispanic White: 97.73%	Population < 1,000.
38. Summit County, Utah	82.39	76.59	Non-Hispanic White: 85.2%	
39. Park County, Colorado	82.37	75.60	Non-Hispanic White: 90.5%	
40. Westchester County, New York	82.29	75.09	Non-Hispanic White: 74.9%	
41. Orange County, California	82.27	76.19	Non-Hispanic White: 42.6%	
42. Stevens County, Minnesota	82.22`	76.68	Non-Hispanic White: 90.5%	
43. Oliver County, North Dakota	82.19	77.30	Non-Hispanic White: 94.0%	Population < 2,000
44. Hayes County, Nebraska	82.14	77.73	Non-Hispanic White: 98.4%	Population < 1,000
44. Bremer County, Iowa	82.14	77.04	Non-Hispanic White: 96.0%	
46. Ozaukee County, Wisconsin	82.13	76.69	Non-Hispanic White: 95.0%	
47. Story County, Iowa	82.11	78.62	Non-Hispanic White: 86.2%	
48. Stearns County, Minnesota	82.10	76.66	Non-Hispanic White: 89.7%	
49. Archuleta County, Colorado	82.08	75.24	Non-Hispanic White: 77.5%	
49. Benton County, Oregon	82.08	77.39	Non-Hispanic White: 82.4%	
49. Johnson County, Iowa	82.08	77.38	Non-Hispanic White: 86.3%	
United States (all)	79.08	73.75	Non-Hispanic White: 62.1%	

== See also ==
- List of U.S. states and territories by life expectancy
- List of U.S. counties with shortest life expectancy
- List of U.S. states by changes in life expectancy, 1985–2010
- List of U.S. congressional districts by life expectancy
- List of North American countries by life expectancy
