= List of U.S. congressional districts by life expectancy =

This article presents life expectancy at birth for the 435 United States congressional districts plus Washington, D.C. (non-voting district). Life expectancy varies from an average 83.9 years in California's 19th district to 72.9 years in Kentucky's 5th district (rural southeastern Kentucky), a gap of 11 years.

Life expectancy is calculated using 2011 mortality data from the Centers for Disease Control and Prevention and population data from the U.S. Census Bureau. These estimates were taken from the Measure of America's report Geographies of Opportunity. Life expectancies can have pronounced differences even in districts that are only hours apart and can highlight inequalities even within the same state. Residents of Pennsylvania's congressional district 16 have a life expectancy of 80.5 years, about 1.5 years longer than the national average. In Pennsylvania's District 2, the average resident has a life expectancy of just 75.6 years.

== Tables ==
Congressional district table:

| Congressional district | State | Life expectancy at birth (years) |
|---|---|---|
| United States | - | 79.4 |
| Congressional district 18 | California | 83.7 |
| Congressional district 12 | New York | 82.9 |
| Congressional district 33 | California | 81.7 |
| Congressional district 17 | California | 83.4 |
| Congressional district 8 | Virginia | 83.5 |
| Congressional district 10 | New York | 82.2 |
| Congressional district 3 | New York | 81.9 |
| Congressional district 10 | Virginia | 82.5 |
| Congressional district 7 | New Jersey | 81.9 |
| Congressional district 8 | Maryland | 83.3 |
| Congressional district 11 | New Jersey | 80.9 |
| Congressional district 11 | Virginia | 83.6 |
| Congressional district 45 | California | 82.6 |
| Congressional district 12 | California | 82.6 |
| Congressional district 5 | Massachusetts | 81.6 |
| Congressional district 3 | Texas | 81.8 |
| Congressional district 5 | New Jersey | 82.0 |
| Congressional district 52 | California | 81.5 |
| Congressional district 14 | California | 83.6 |
| Congressional district 4 | Connecticut | 82.5 |
| Congressional district 6 | Illinois | 81.1 |
| Congressional district 4 | Massachusetts | 80.6 |
| Congressional district 7 | Washington | 81.8 |
| Congressional district 48 | California | 82.6 |
| Congressional district 17 | New York | 82.6 |
| Congressional district 22 | Texas | 80.9 |
| Congressional district 3 | Minnesota | 81.4 |
| Congressional district (at large) | District of Columbia | 78.3 |
| Congressional district 4 | New York | 82.5 |
| Congressional district 15 | California | 82.0 |
| Congressional district 8 | Massachusetts | 80.9 |
| Congressional district 6 | Georgia | 79.1 |
| Congressional district 6 | Massachusetts | 81.1 |
| Congressional district 16 | New York | 81.6 |
| Congressional district 2 | Missouri | 79.4 |
| Congressional district 7 | Texas | 79.4 |
| Congressional district 3 | Maryland | 79.1 |
| Congressional district 2 | Colorado | 82.3 |
| Congressional district 6 | New York | 83.0 |
| Congressional district 5 | Illinois | 79.4 |
| Congressional district 1 | Washington | 81.1 |
| Congressional district 9 | Illinois | 79.2 |
| Congressional district 6 | Maryland | 81.4 |
| Congressional district 1 | New York | 80.6 |
| Congressional district 11 | Michigan | 78.5 |
| Congressional district 7 | Pennsylvania | 79.5 |
| Congressional district 9 | North Carolina | 79.6 |
| Congressional district 14 | Illinois | 80.6 |
| Congressional district 26 | Texas | 80.3 |
| Congressional district 4 | New Jersey | 80.0 |
| Congressional district 8 | Pennsylvania | 80.2 |
| Congressional district 2 | Minnesota | 81.6 |
| Congressional district 12 | New Jersey | 80.9 |
| Congressional district 6 | Pennsylvania | 80.4 |
| Congressional district 11 | New York | 80.9 |
| Congressional district 6 | New Jersey | 81.0 |
| Congressional district 39 | California | 82.0 |
| Congressional district 11 | California | 81.6 |
| Congressional district 27 | California | 81.6 |
| Congressional district 30 | California | 81.7 |
| Congressional district 13 | California | 82.0 |
| Congressional district 1 | Connecticut | 80.1 |
| Congressional district 3 | Kansas | 80.4 |
| Congressional district 6 | Arizona | 80.4 |
| Congressional district 3 | Massachusetts | 81.2 |
| Congressional district 10 | Illinois | 80.9 |
| Congressional district 5 | Maryland | 78.8 |
| Congressional district 1 | Hawaii | 82.4 |
| Congressional district 8 | Washington | 80.9 |
| Congressional district 3 | New Jersey | 79.8 |
| Congressional district 5 | Connecticut | 80.8 |
| Congressional district 19 | California | 83.9 |
| Congressional district 5 | Wisconsin | 80.8 |
| Congressional district 2 | New York | 81.1 |
| Congressional district 6 | Colorado | 81.0 |
| Congressional district 5 | Arizona | 80.4 |
| Congressional district 3 | Connecticut | 80.4 |
| Congressional district 9 | New Jersey | 81.6 |
| Congressional district 6 | Minnesota | 81.2 |
| Congressional district 9 | Washington | 81.8 |
| Congressional district 4 | California | 80.9 |
| Congressional district 1 | Virginia | 80.2 |
| Congressional district 2 | California | 81.2 |
| Congressional district 21 | Texas | 80.4 |
| Congressional district 4 | Minnesota | 80.7 |
| Congressional district 28 | California | 81.7 |
| Congressional district 1 | New Hampshire | 80.2 |
| Congressional district 2 | Texas | 79.4 |
| Congressional district 25 | California | 81.8 |
| Congressional district 23 | Florida | 81.0 |
| Congressional district 49 | California | 81.8 |
| Congressional district 21 | Florida | 82.0 |
| Congressional district 2 | Connecticut | 80.6 |
| Congressional district 5 | Indiana | 78.4 |
| Congressional district 18 | New York | 80.5 |
| Congressional district 2 | Massachusetts | 80.3 |
| Congressional district 24 | Texas | 79.1 |
| Congressional district 7 | Virginia | 79.3 |
| Congressional district 5 | Minnesota | 81.3 |
| Congressional district 53 | California | 81.5 |
| Congressional district 7 | Georgia | 81.1 |
| Congressional district 13 | North Carolina | 79.4 |
| Congressional district 2 | Wisconsin | 80.7 |
| Congressional district 22 | Florida | 81.9 |
| Congressional district 10 | Texas | 79.9 |
| Congressional district 20 | New York | 79.8 |
| Congressional district 11 | Illinois | 80.9 |
| Congressional district 32 | Texas | 78.8 |
| Congressional district 1 | Oregon | 81.2 |
| Congressional district 7 | Massachusetts | 80.8 |
| Congressional district 8 | Arizona | 80.4 |
| Congressional district 8 | Michigan | 79.5 |
| Congressional district 7 | Illinois | 79.2 |
| Congressional district 18 | Pennsylvania | 78.3 |
| Congressional district 12 | Ohio | 78.6 |
| Congressional district 9 | New York | 81.0 |
| Congressional district 7 | California | 79.2 |
| Congressional district 9 | Massachusetts | 80.2 |
| Congressional district 2 | Rhode Island | 79.8 |
| Congressional district 42 | California | 80.4 |
| Congressional district 8 | New York | 81.1 |
| Congressional district 2 | New Hampshire | 79.9 |
| Congressional district 26 | California | 82.1 |
| Congressional district 4 | Colorado | 80.5 |
| Congressional district 16 | Ohio | 78.3 |
| Congressional district 2 | Maryland | 78.9 |
| Congressional district 31 | Texas | 80.5 |
| Congressional district 18 | Florida | 81.6 |
| Congressional district 7 | Florida | 80.2 |
| Congressional district 5 | New York | 82.9 |
| Congressional district 47 | California | 82.1 |
| Congressional district 1 | Minnesota | 81.9 |
| Congressional district 11 | Georgia | 79.2 |
| Congressional district 1 | Colorado | 79.2 |
| Congressional district 25 | New York | 79.8 |
| Congressional district 3 | Nevada | 78.4 |
| Congressional district 1 | Maine | 80.0 |
| Congressional district 1 | Maryland | 78.9 |
| Congressional district 5 | California | 80.7 |
| Congressional district 2 | Nebraska | 79.1 |
| Congressional district 4 | Maryland | 78.6 |
| Congressional district 4 | North Carolina | 79.8 |
| Congressional district 12 | Pennsylvania | 78.1 |
| Congressional district 7 | Maryland | 77.1 |
| Congressional district 25 | Texas | 78.9 |
| Congressional district 8 | Illinois | 80.4 |
| Congressional district 14 | Ohio | 78.4 |
| Congressional district 37 | California | 81.7 |
| Congressional district 7 | Colorado | 79.8 |
| Congressional district 1 | South Carolina | 79.6 |
| Congressional district 3 | Iowa | 79.3 |
| Congressional district 18 | Illinois | 78.8 |
| Congressional district 9 | Arizona | 80.4 |
| Congressional district 2 | Washington | 80.9 |
| Congressional district (at large) | Vermont | 79.9 |
| Congressional district 1 | New Jersey | 78.1 |
| Congressional district 2 | Hawaii | 81.8 |
| Congressional district 5 | Georgia | 78.6 |
| Congressional district 12 | Texas | 78.6 |
| Congressional district 3 | Oregon | 79.4 |
| Congressional district 6 | Alabama | 76.0 |
| Congressional district 13 | Pennsylvania | 77.9 |
| Congressional district 27 | New York | 78.7 |
| Congressional district 1 | Massachusetts | 79.7 |
| Congressional district 24 | New York | 79.6 |
| Congressional district (at large) | Alaska | 78.7 |
| Congressional district 8 | Texas | 78.3 |
| Congressional district 6 | Texas | 78.5 |
| Congressional district 1 | Wisconsin | 78.9 |
| Congressional district 5 | Colorado | 79.9 |
| Congressional district 15 | Pennsylvania | 79.6 |
| Congressional district 10 | New Jersey | 79.5 |
| Congressional district 24 | California | 81.8 |
| Congressional district 38 | California | 81.7 |
| Congressional district 1 | Illinois | 79.4 |
| Congressional district 26 | Florida | 81.6 |
| Congressional district 1 | Rhode Island | 80.0 |
| Congressional district 6 | Wisconsin | 80.0 |
| Congressional district 1 | Iowa | 80.1 |
| Congressional district 2 | Iowa | 79.2 |
| Congressional district 6 | Louisiana | 76.9 |
| Congressional district 50 | California | 81.4 |
| Congressional district 3 | Illinois | 79.3 |
| Congressional district 1 | Nebraska | 80.2 |
| Congressional district 8 | Wisconsin | 79.7 |
| Congressional district 4 | Utah | 79.9 |
| Congressional district 19 | New York | 79.4 |
| Congressional district 16 | Florida | 81.2 |
| Congressional district (at large) | Delaware | 78.5 |
| Congressional district 10 | Florida | 79.9 |
| Congressional district 8 | New Jersey | 80.2 |
| Congressional district 9 | Michigan | 78.8 |
| Congressional district 12 | Florida | 78.2 |
| Congressional district 12 | Michigan | 77.5 |
| Congressional district 4 | Pennsylvania | 79.4 |
| Congressional district 1 | Ohio | 77.7 |
| Congressional district (at large) | North Dakota | 79.9 |
| Congressional district 3 | Utah | 80.1 |
| Congressional district 7 | New York | 81.6 |
| Congressional district 2 | Utah | 80.2 |
| Congressional district 10 | Washington | 79.4 |
| Congressional district 27 | Florida | 81.8 |
| Congressional district 19 | Florida | 81.9 |
| Congressional district 6 | Washington | 79.4 |
| Congressional district 16 | Pennsylvania | 80.5 |
| Congressional district 3 | Michigan | 79.2 |
| Congressional district 14 | New York | 81.8 |
| Congressional district 4 | Virginia | 78.1 |
| Congressional district 26 | New York | 78.3 |
| Congressional district (at large) | Wyoming | 78.6 |
| Congressional district 3 | Washington | 79.2 |
| Congressional district 2 | Virginia | 78.6 |
| Congressional district 3 | Colorado | 79.6 |
| Congressional district 13 | Florida | 78.9 |
| Congressional district 16 | Illinois | 78.5 |
| Congressional district 4 | Georgia | 79.2 |
| Congressional district 15 | Florida | 79.1 |
| Congressional district 20 | California | 82.2 |
| Congressional district 13 | New York | 82.2 |
| Congressional district 25 | Florida | 82.4 |
| Congressional district 10 | Michigan | 78.2 |
| Congressional district 2 | South Carolina | 77.5 |
| Congressional district 2 | North Carolina | 78.4 |
| Congressional district 15 | Ohio | 77.2 |
| Congressional district 13 | Georgia | 78.3 |
| Congressional district 4 | Iowa | 80.0 |
| Congressional district 7 | Minnesota | 80.1 |
| Congressional district 6 | North Carolina | 77.8 |
| Congressional district 14 | Pennsylvania | 78.4 |
| Congressional district 5 | Ohio | 78.5 |
| Congressional district 6 | Missouri | 78.1 |
| Congressional district 1 | New Mexico | 79.0 |
| Congressional district 3 | Missouri | 78.3 |
| Congressional district 4 | Florida | 76.7 |
| Congressional district 1 | Utah | 79.8 |
| Congressional district 1 | Louisiana | 76.9 |
| Congressional district 5 | Oregon | 79.9 |
| Congressional district 4 | Kansas | 77.9 |
| Congressional district 5 | Virginia | 78.1 |
| Congressional district 3 | Kentucky | 76.8 |
| Congressional district 6 | Florida | 79.1 |
| Congressional district 13 | Illinois | 78.6 |
| Congressional district 5 | Washington | 79.2 |
| Congressional district 43 | California | 81.7 |
| Congressional district 32 | California | 81.7 |
| Congressional district 6 | California | 79.3 |
| Congressional district 3 | Wisconsin | 80.0 |
| Congressional district (at large) | South Dakota | 79.4 |
| Congressional district 4 | Kentucky | 77.1 |
| Congressional district 2 | Illinois | 79.1 |
| Congressional district 22 | New York | 79.3 |
| Congressional district 2 | Ohio | 76.7 |
| Congressional district 8 | Minnesota | 79.5 |
| Congressional district 8 | Florida | 79.1 |
| Congressional district 11 | Pennsylvania | 78.0 |
| Congressional district 5 | Tennessee | 77.1 |
| Congressional district 7 | Michigan | 78.7 |
| Congressional district 2 | Arizona | 79.4 |
| Congressional district 14 | Florida | 79.2 |
| Congressional district 7 | Tennessee | 77.3 |
| Congressional district 3 | Georgia | 77.1 |
| Congressional district 7 | Wisconsin | 79.4 |
| Congressional district 4 | Indiana | 78.5 |
| Congressional district 3 | Nebraska | 79.7 |
| Congressional district 14 | Texas | 77.8 |
| Congressional district 2 | Kansas | 77.8 |
| Congressional district 2 | Nevada | 77.8 |
| Congressional district 3 | California | 79.2 |
| Congressional district 8 | Tennessee | 75.7 |
| Congressional district 2 | Pennsylvania | 75.6 |
| Congressional district 2 | New Jersey | 77.6 |
| Congressional district 6 | Michigan | 78.8 |
| Congressional district 3 | New Mexico | 78.6 |
| Congressional district 1 | Indiana | 77.4 |
| Congressional district 21 | New York | 79.3 |
| Congressional district 9 | Indiana | 77.4 |
| Congressional district 10 | Ohio | 77.3 |
| Congressional district 2 | Michigan | 79.5 |
| Congressional district 1 | Oklahoma | 76.7 |
| Congressional district 17 | Texas | 79.1 |
| Congressional district 23 | New York | 78.8 |
| Congressional district 23 | California | 78.0 |
| Congressional district 8 | Ohio | 77.3 |
| Congressional district 9 | Florida | 79.9 |
| Congressional district 3 | Pennsylvania | 78.2 |
| Congressional district 1 | Idaho | 79.2 |
| Congressional district 5 | Alabama | 76.9 |
| Congressional district 12 | Illinois | 76.9 |
| Congressional district 4 | South Carolina | 77.3 |
| Congressional district 17 | Pennsylvania | 78.0 |
| Congressional district 5 | Missouri | 77.4 |
| Congressional district 36 | Texas | 77.0 |
| Congressional district 31 | California | 78.8 |
| Congressional district 1 | Missouri | 77.3 |
| Congressional district 9 | California | 79.4 |
| Congressional district 6 | Kentucky | 77.3 |
| Congressional district 3 | Indiana | 78.2 |
| Congressional district 24 | Florida | 81.6 |
| Congressional district 2 | Tennessee | 76.9 |
| Congressional district 1 | Kansas | 78.6 |
| Congressional district 15 | Illinois | 77.6 |
| Congressional district 2 | Arkansas | 77.1 |
| Congressional district 10 | Georgia | 77.6 |
| Congressional district (at large) | Montana | 78.5 |
| Congressional district 10 | Pennsylvania | 78.8 |
| Congressional district 22 | California | 78.7 |
| Congressional district 2 | Maine | 78.3 |
| Congressional district 5 | North Carolina | 77.8 |
| Congressional district 11 | Ohio | 77.5 |
| Congressional district 8 | California | 79.0 |
| Congressional district 1 | Arizona | 78.2 |
| Congressional district 5 | Pennsylvania | 78.5 |
| Congressional district 14 | Michigan | 77.6 |
| Congressional district 7 | Ohio | 78.2 |
| Congressional district 6 | Virginia | 78.1 |
| Congressional district 2 | Idaho | 79.3 |
| Congressional district 3 | Ohio | 77.3 |
| Congressional district 3 | Arkansas | 78.0 |
| Congressional district 4 | Nevada | 77.8 |
| Congressional district 4 | Ohio | 78.2 |
| Congressional district 1 | California | 78.3 |
| Congressional district 20 | Texas | 79.0 |
| Congressional district 17 | Florida | 80.3 |
| Congressional district 17 | Illinois | 78.2 |
| Congressional district 9 | Texas | 80.0 |
| Congressional district 8 | Indiana | 77.2 |
| Congressional district 3 | Florida | 77.5 |
| Congressional district 4 | Wisconsin | 77.6 |
| Congressional district 41 | California | 80.4 |
| Congressional district 9 | Pennsylvania | 77.9 |
| Congressional district 1 | Georgia | 77.3 |
| Congressional district 20 | Florida | 81.4 |
| Congressional district 3 | Oklahoma | 76.3 |
| Congressional district 2 | Florida | 77.6 |
| Congressional district 2 | West Virginia | 76.4 |
| Congressional district 4 | Oregon | 78.7 |
| Congressional district 36 | California | 80.4 |
| Congressional district 1 | Pennsylvania | 76.0 |
| Congressional district 10 | California | 78.4 |
| Congressional district 7 | North Carolina | 77.6 |
| Congressional district 5 | South Carolina | 76.0 |
| Congressional district 9 | Georgia | 78.3 |
| Congressional district 9 | Ohio | 77.5 |
| Congressional district 18 | Texas | 79.4 |
| Congressional district 2 | Oregon | 78.9 |
| Congressional district 1 | Florida | 77.3 |
| Congressional district 6 | Indiana | 76.9 |
| Congressional district 30 | Texas | 78.6 |
| Congressional district 3 | Louisiana | 76.1 |
| Congressional district 2 | Kentucky | 77.2 |
| Congressional district 16 | Texas | 79.9 |
| Congressional district 1 | Michigan | 78.9 |
| Congressional district 11 | Texas | 77.2 |
| Congressional district 10 | North Carolina | 77.0 |
| Congressional district 4 | Oklahoma | 76.3 |
| Congressional district 13 | Ohio | 77.4 |
| Congressional district 4 | Missouri | 77.9 |
| Congressional district 11 | North Carolina | 77.8 |
| Congressional district 2 | Indiana | 77.5 |
| Congressional district 5 | Oklahoma | 75.5 |
| Congressional district 4 | Michigan | 78.3 |
| Congressional district 46 | California | 82.6 |
| Congressional district 1 | West Virginia | 76.6 |
| Congressional district 4 | Arizona | 78.5 |
| Congressional district 23 | Texas | 79.2 |
| Congressional district 27 | Texas | 78.0 |
| Congressional district 4 | Tennessee | 76.5 |
| Congressional district 11 | Florida | 77.8 |
| Congressional district 3 | Mississippi | 75.1 |
| Congressional district 4 | Texas | 76.5 |
| Congressional district 4 | Washington | 79.3 |
| Congressional district 7 | Missouri | 77.6 |
| Congressional district 12 | North Carolina | 79.1 |
| Congressional district 4 | Illinois | 79.2 |
| Congressional district 29 | California | 81.7 |
| Congressional district 3 | South Carolina | 76.8 |
| Congressional district 8 | Georgia | 76.4 |
| Congressional district 13 | Texas | 77.0 |
| Congressional district 8 | North Carolina | 76.8 |
| Congressional district 5 | Texas | 77.1 |
| Congressional district 2 | Alabama | 76.2 |
| Congressional district 15 | Texas | 81.2 |
| Congressional district 3 | North Carolina | 77.9 |
| Congressional district 6 | Tennessee | 76.3 |
| Congressional district 6 | Ohio | 76.3 |
| Congressional district 3 | Tennessee | 75.9 |
| Congressional district 28 | Texas | 79.9 |
| Congressional district 51 | California | 81.6 |
| Congressional district 35 | Texas | 80.3 |
| Congressional district 3 | Arizona | 80.3 |
| Congressional district 2 | Louisiana | 76.7 |
| Congressional district 14 | Georgia | 76.4 |
| Congressional district 35 | California | 79.4 |
| Congressional district 3 | Virginia | 76.6 |
| Congressional district 1 | Alabama | 75.6 |
| Congressional district 1 | Mississippi | 75.8 |
| Congressional district 19 | Texas | 77.1 |
| Congressional district 3 | Alabama | 75.1 |
| Congressional district 4 | Louisiana | 75.8 |
| Congressional district 9 | Tennessee | 76.4 |
| Congressional district 44 | California | 81.7 |
| Congressional district 34 | California | 81.7 |
| Congressional district 5 | Michigan | 76.7 |
| Congressional district 12 | Georgia | 75.7 |
| Congressional district 9 | Virginia | 75.6 |
| Congressional district 1 | Texas | 76.3 |
| Congressional district 7 | Indiana | 76.5 |
| Congressional district 4 | Mississippi | 75.4 |
| Congressional district 2 | New Mexico | 77.8 |
| Congressional district 5 | Florida | 78.4 |
| Congressional district 1 | North Carolina | 77.3 |
| Congressional district 34 | Texas | 80.0 |
| Congressional district 1 | Nevada | 78.4 |
| Congressional district 4 | Arkansas | 75.0 |
| Congressional district 2 | Oklahoma | 74.5 |
| Congressional district 7 | Arizona | 80.4 |
| Congressional district 7 | South Carolina | 75.7 |
| Congressional district 1 | Kentucky | 75.5 |
| Congressional district 1 | Tennessee | 75.8 |
| Congressional district 6 | South Carolina | 76.9 |
| Congressional district 8 | Missouri | 75.4 |
| Congressional district 1 | Arkansas | 74.5 |
| Congressional district 16 | California | 79.2 |
| Congressional district 15 | New York | 79.4 |
| Congressional district 5 | Louisiana | 75.1 |
| Congressional district 40 | California | 81.7 |
| Congressional district 4 | Alabama | 73.8 |
| Congressional district 7 | Alabama | 74.9 |
| Congressional district 29 | Texas | 79.4 |
| Congressional district 13 | Michigan | 75.8 |
| Congressional district 2 | Georgia | 75.2 |
| Congressional district 2 | Mississippi | 73.6 |
| Congressional district 3 | West Virginia | 73.0 |
| Congressional district 33 | Texas | 78.8 |
| Congressional district 5 | Kentucky | 72.9 |
| Congressional district 21 | California | 78.4 |

State table:

| State | Life expectancy at birth 2018 (years) |
|---|---|
| United States | 79.4 |
| Alabama | 75.3 |
| Alaska | 78.3 |
| Arizona | 79.7 |
| Arkansas | 75.9 |
| California | 81.5 |
| Colorado | 80.5 |
| Connecticut | 81.0 |
| Delaware | 78.6 |
| District of Columbia | 78.5 |
| Florida | 80.0 |
| Georgia (U.S. state) | 77.7 |
| Hawaii | 82.5 |
| Idaho | 79.3 |
| Illinois | 79.4 |
| Indiana | 77.2 |
| Iowa | 79.5 |
| Kansas | 78.8 |
| Kentucky | 75.3 |
| Louisiana | 76.2 |
| Maine | 78.7 |
| Maryland | 79.2 |
| Massachusetts | 80.5 |
| Minnesota | 81.0 |
| Michigan | 78.1 |
| Mississippi | 74.8 |
| Missouri | 77.5 |
| Montana | 78.5 |
| Nebraska | 79.8 |
| Nevada | 78.3 |
| New Hampshire | 79.4 |
| New Jersey | 80.5 |
| New Mexico | 78.0 |
| New York | 81.3 |
| North Carolina | 78.0 |
| North Dakota | 79.9 |
| Ohio | 77.1 |
| Oklahoma | 76.0 |
| Oregon | 79.7 |
| Pennsylvania | 78.3 |
| Rhode Island | 80.1 |
| South Carolina | 77.0 |
| South Dakota | 79.0 |
| Tennessee | 76.1 |
| Texas | 79.1 |
| Utah | 79.6 |
| Vermont | 79.7 |
| Virginia | 79.5 |
| Washington | 80.4 |
| West Virginia | 75.0 |
| Wisconsin | 79.4 |
| Wyoming | 79.1 |

== See also ==
- List of U.S. states and territories by life expectancy
- List of U.S. states by changes in life expectancy, 1985–2010
- List of U.S. counties with shortest life expectancy
- List of U.S. counties with longest life expectancy

== Notes ==
- Table data from Measure of America calculations using mortality data from the Centers for Disease Control and Prevention, National Center for Health Statistics, as compiled from data provided by the 57 vital statistics jurisdictions through the Vital Statistics Cooperative Program.
