= List of U.S. states by changes in life expectancy, 1985–2010 =

This article ranks states of the United States sorted by changes in the life expectancy of their residents between 1985 and 2010. Changes in the life expectancy of men and women in each state are also sorted. States are also ranked for three risk factors controllable by the individual: obesity, smoking, and physical activity.

The data is taken from the Institute for Health Metrics and Evaluation, an independent global health research center at the University of Washington.

Increase in life expectancy, 1985–2010 (all values expressed in years)
rank and state	increase in life expectancy, 1985–2010—all	increase in life expectancy, 1985–2010—male	increase in life expectancy, 1985–2010—female
1. District of Columbia	7.2	9.4	5.1
2. New York	6.2	7.5	5.0
3. New Jersey	5.5	6.6	4.5
4. California	5.3	6.5	4.2
5. Massachusetts	4.9	6.0	3.9
6. Maryland	4.9	5.9	3.9
7. New Hampshire	4.9	5.9	3.8
8. Connecticut	4.8	5.8	3.8
9. Virginia	4.8	6.0	3.5
10. Illinois	4.5	5.6	3.5
10. Vermont	4.5	5.7	3.4
12. Delaware	4.4	5.3	3.6
13. Georgia	4.2	5.7	2.8
14. Nevada	4.2	5.2	3.1
United States (all)	4.1	5.3	3.0
15. Florida	4.1	5.1	3.l
16. Pennsylvania	4.0	4.9	3.2
17. Arizona	4.0	5.1	2.9
17. Minnesota	4.0	5.1	2.9
19. Rhode Island	4.0	5.0	2.9
19. South Carolina	4.0	5.0	2.9
21. North Carolina	3.9	5.3	2.6
22. Washington	3.9	5.1	2.8
23. Maine	3.9	5.0	2.8
23. Michigan	3.9	5.0	2.8
25. Texas	3.8	5.3	2.4
26. Oregon	3.7	5.0	2.5
27. Colorado	3.7	4.7	2.7
28, Alaska	3.6	4.9	2.4
29. Wisconsin	3.5	4.5	2.5
30. Nebraska	3.4	4.6	2.1
31. Ohio	3.2	4.1	2.3
31. Utah	3.2	4.2	2.2
33. Hawaii	3.1	3.2	3.0
33. South Dakota	3.1	4.4	1.8
35. Iowa	3.0	4.2	1.9
35. New Mexico	3.0	4.1	2.0
37. Idaho	3.0	4.2	1.8
38. Indiana	2.9	3.8	2.1
39. Louisiana	2.9	3.7	2.1
40. North Dakota	2.9	3.9	1.9
41. Missouri	2.8	3.8	1.7
42, Montana	2.7	4.0	1.6
43. Wyoming	2.7	3.9	1.6
44. Tennessee	2.7	3.8	1.4
45. Kansas	2.5	3.5	1.5
46. Kentucky	2.4	3.6	1.1
47. Alabama	2.1	3.3	0.9
48. Arkansas	2.0	3.2	1.0
49. Mississippi	2.0	3.1	0.8
50. West Virginia	1.9	2.7	1.0
51. Oklahoma	1.2	2.4	0.1

Note: May not add to total due to rounding.

== Life expectancy (years) ==
Average life expectancy from birth (all values expressed in years)
rank and state	2010 all	2010 male	2010 female	1985 all	1985 male	1985 female
1. Hawaii	80.7	77.8	83.5	77.6	74.6	80.5
2. California	80.4	78.2	82.5	75.0	71.7	78.3
3. Connecticut	80.4	78.2	82.5	75.6	72.4	78.7
4. Minnesota	80.3	78.2	82.5	76.3	73.0	79.6
5. Massachusetts	80.1	77.8	82.4	75.2	71.9	78.5
6. New Hampshire	79.9	77.9	81.9	75.0	72.0	78.1
7. New York	79.9	77.6	82.2	73.7	70.2	77.1
8. New Jersey	79.7	77.5	82.0	74.2	70.9	77.5
9. Colorado	79.7	77.6	81.7	76.0	72.9	79.0
10. Utah	79.7	77.8	81.6	76.5	73.6	79.4
11. Washington	79.6	77.6	81.6	75.7	72.5	78.8
12. Vermont	79.5	77.3	81.6	75.0	71.7	78.2
13. North Dakota	79.4	76.7	82.0	76.5	72.9	80.1
14. Wisconsin	79.3	77.0	81.6	75.8	72.5	79.1
15. Arizona	79.3	76.8	81.7	75.3	71.7	78.8
16. Nebraska	79.1	76.9	81.4	75.7	72.3	79.2.
17. Oregon	79.1	77.0	81.2	75.4	72.0	78.7
18. Rhode Island	79.1	76.7	81.4	75.1	71.7	78.5
19. Florida	79.0	76.3	81.6	74.9	71.2	78.5
19. Idaho	79.0	77.0	80.9	76.0	72.8	79.1
21. Iowa	78.9	76.7	81.2	75.9	72.5	79.3
22. South Dakota	78.9	76.4	81.4	75.8	72.0	79.6
23. Maine	78.7	76.5	80.9	74.8	71.5	78.1
24. Illinois	78.6	76.3	81.0	74.1	70.7	77.5
25. Virginia	78.5	76.3	80.7	73.7	70.3	77.1
United States (all)	78.5	76.1	80.8	74.3	70.8	77.8
26. Maryland	78.4	76.1	80.8	73.5	70.2	76.9
27. Montana	78.3	76.2	80.5	75.6	72.3	79.0
28. Pennsylvania	78.2	75.7	80.7	74.2	70.8	77.5
29. Kansas	78.1	75.8	80.5	75.6	72.3	79.0
30. Texas	78.1	75.8	80.4	74.3	70.5	78.0
31. Wyoming	78.0	75.8	80.2	75.3	72.0	78.6
31. Delaware	78.0	75.6	80.4	73.6	70.3	76.8
33. Alaska	78.0	75.8	80.1	74.3	70.9	77.7
34. Nevada	77.9	75.6	80.2	73.7	70.4	77.1
34. New Mexico	77.9	75.2	80.6	74.9	71.2	78.6
36. Michigan	77.8	75.5	80.1	73.8	70.4	77.3
37. Ohio	77.4	75.0	79.7	74.2	70.9	77.4
38. North Carolina	77.3	74.8	79.8	73.4	69.5	77.2
39. Indiana	77.2	74.7	79.8	74.3	70.9	77.7
40. Missouri	77.1	74.6	79.6	74.3	70.8	77.9
41. Georgia	76.8	74.4	79.2	72.6	68.7	76.4
42. South Carolina	76.5	73.7	79.2	72.5	68.6	76.3
43, District of Columbia	76.4	73.7	79.l	69.2	64.3	74.0
44. Tennessee	76.1	73.4	78.7	73.4	69.5	77.3
45. Arkansas	75.8	73.0	78.5	73.8	69.8	77.5
46. Kentucky	75.7	73.2	78.2	73.3	69.5	77.1
47. Oklahoma	75.6	73.2	78.0	74.4	70.8	78.0
48. West Virginia	75.4	72.6	78.1	73.5	69.8	77.1
49. Louisiana	75.3	72.5	78.2	72.4	68.8	76.1
50. Alabama	75.1	72.4	77.8	73.0	69.l	76.9
51. Mississippi	74.4	71.5	77.4	72.4	68.4	76.5

Note: may not add to total due to rounding

== Controllable risk factors ==
This list ranks U.S. states for three factors, controllable by the individual: obesity, smoking, and physical activity. These factors affect longevity: obesity and smoking reduce longevity and a higher level of physical activity increases longevity.

Controllable risk factors—ranking
rank and state	longevity (2010)	obesity—lowest to highest (2011)	smoking—lowest to highest (2011)	physical activity—highest to lowest (2011)
1. Hawaii	80.7	1	8	2
2. California	80.4	6	2	6
3. Connecticut	80.4	7	3	19
4. Minnesota	80.3	18	19	15
5. Massachusetts	80.1	5	6	26
6. New Hampshire	79.9	14	16	10
7. New York	79.9	10	12	33
8. New Jersey	79.7	9	3	24
9. Colorado	79.7	2	13	1
10. Utah	79.7	11	1	8
11. Washington	79.6	21	9	5
12. Vermont	79.5	4	17	3
13. North Dakota	79.4	30	31	30
14. Wisconsin	79.3	27	23	13
15. Arizona	79.3	14	6	16
16. Nebraska	79.1	33	21	30
17. Oregon	79.1	19	21	4
18. Rhode Island	79.1	17	14	34
19. Florida	79.0	22	15	23
19. Idaho	79.0	22	5	13
21. Iowa	78.9	31	29	27
22. South Dakota	78.9	29	39	35
23. Maine	78.7	20	36	9
24. Illinois	78.6	25	10	22
25. Virginia	78.5	24	20	21
26. Maryland	78.4	26	10	27
27. Montana	78.3	8	32	10
28. Pennsylvania	78.2	35	29	29
29. Kansas	78.1	34	27	40
30. Texas	78.1	38	12	38
31. Wyoming	78.0	13	34	17
31. Delaware	78.0	36	24	39
33. Alaska	78.0	28	34	12
34. Nevada	77.9	11	25	25
34. New Mexico	77.9	14	26	18
36. Michigan	77.8	42	41	20
37. Ohio	77.4	40	43	32
38. North Carolina	77.3	36	33	41
39. Indiana	77.2	40	40	43
40. Missouri	77.1	42	47	37
41. Georgia	76.8	32	27	36
42. South Carolina	76.5	44	37	42
43, District of Columbia	76.4	3	17	8
44. Tennessee	76.1	42	45	51
45. Arkansas	75.8	45	49	44
46. Kentucky	75.7	47	51	46
47. Oklahoma	75.6	45	46	44
48. West Virginia	75.4	48	50	49
49. Louisiana	75.3	50	44	47
50. Alabama	75.1	49	42	48
51. Mississippi	74.4	51	48	50

View chart definition.

== See also ==
- List of U.S. states and territories by life expectancy
- List of U.S. counties with shortest life expectancy
- List of U.S. counties with longest life expectancy
