= List of people from Birmingham, Alabama =

This is a list of individuals who are natives of, or are notable in association with, the city of Birmingham, Alabama.

== Academia ==
- Monnie T. Cheves, Samford University professor; member of the Louisiana House of Representatives from 1952 to 1960; died in Birmingham in 1988
- Frank Moore Cross, religious scholar
- Angela Davis, social activist and author
- Richard Nelson Frye, scholar of Iran and Central Asia
- Roland Frye, scholar
- Carol Garrison, ex-president of University of Alabama at Birmingham
- Zenkei Blanche Hartman, first abbess of the San Francisco Zen Center
- Freeman Hrabowski III, educator
- Herman H. Long, president of Talladega College and United Negro College Fund
- J. Gordon Melton, religious scholar
- Emil Wolfgang Menzel, Jr., emeritus professor in psychology
- Edward Taub, behavioral neuroscientist and professor at the University of Alabama at Birmingham
- Julia Tutwiler, educator and social reformer

== Arts and literature ==
- Allen Barra, journalist, sportswriter
- John Beecher, activist poet
- Edgar Peters Bowron, art historian
- Joe David Brown, journalist, novelist
- Mark Childress, author
- Jon Coffelt, artist
- Clayton Colvin, artist
- Dennis Covington, journalist, writer
- George R. Ellis, author, art historian and director of Honolulu Academy of Arts
- Fannie Flagg, author
- Charles Gaines, novelist, screenwriter
- Charles Ghigna, poet, children's author
- Christopher Gilbert, poet
- Gail Godwin, novelist
- John Green, author
- Joe Hilley, novelist
- Caitlín R. Kiernan, novelist and paleontologist
- Kerry James Marshall, artist
- Harold E. Martin, Pulitzer Prize-winning newspaperman
- Spider Martin, photojournalist
- Robert R. McCammon, novelist
- Kevin McGowin, novelist, reviewer
- Diane McWhorter, Pulitzer Prize-winning author
- Walker Percy, author
- Howell Raines, New York Times editor
- James Redfield, novelist
- John Rhoden, sculptor
- Sonia Sanchez, poet
- Rowland Scherman, Grammy-award-winning photographer
- Melissa Springer, photographer
- Ann Waldron, author
- Margaret Walker, poet and author
- Daniel Wallace, novelist
- Mary Ware (1828–1915), poet, prose writer
- John Weld, newspaper reporter, writer, Hollywood stunt man
- Tobias Wolff, author

== Business and economics ==
- Cynthia Bathurst, animal rights activist, former mathematical analyst, founder/director of Safe Humane Chicago and Court Case Dog Program
- Ashton B. Collins, Sr., inventor, creator of Reddy Kilowatt
- Newton Collins, businessman and community builder
- Samuel DiPiazza, former chairman and chief executive officer of PricewaterhouseCoopers
- A. G. Gaston, prominent African-American businessman
- Franklin Potts Glass, Sr., newspaper editor
- Jay Grinney, president and chief executive officer of HealthSouth Corporation
- John M. Harbert, billionaire and founder of Harbert Corporation
- Elmer Harris, chief executive officer of Alabama Power
- Ron Holt, CEO and founder of Two Maids & A Mop
- Charles Linn, founder of First National Bank of Birmingham (AmSouth Bancorporation)
- Don Logan, chief executive officer of Time Inc.; chairman of Warner Media; chief executive officer of Southern Progress, owner of Birmingham Barons baseball team
- Michael K. Powell, Federal Communications Commission chairman
- Rufus N. Rhodes, founder of Birmingham News
- Richard M. Scrushy, founder and former CEO of HealthSouth Corporation
- James Sloss, industrialist and founder of Sloss Furnaces
- Skippy Smith (1913–2003), founder of Pacific Parachute Company in San Diego, California, stunt skydiver
- Alvin Vogtle, chairman and CEO of Alabama Power and Southern Company
- Allen Harvey Woodward, industrialist and baseball team owner

== Entertainment ==
- Mary Anderson, actress
- R. G. Armstrong, actor (Pleasant Grove, Alabama)
- Mary Badham, juvenile actress
- Candace Bailey, actress
- Amber Benson, actress
- Anna Lee Carroll, actress
- Lynne Carver, actress
- Nell Carter, actress and singer
- Courteney Cox, actress (Mountain Brook, Alabama)
- Paul Finebaum, radio/TV personality
- Jordan Fisher, actor, singer, and dancer
- Fannie Flagg, author, actress
- Louise Fletcher, actress
- David F. Friedman, director and producer
- Lili Gentle, actress
- Betty Lou Gerson, actress
- Gladys Gillem, wrestler
- Walton Goggins, actor
- Hank Green, Internet personality, podcaster
- Paula Hill, actress
- Alan Hunter, MTV VJ
- Tamisha Iman, drag queen
- Kate Jackson, actress
- David Jaffe, video game designer (God of War and Twisted Metal)
- Jasika Nicole, actress, illustrator
- Gail Patrick, actress, television producer
- Ibrehem Rahman, Survivor: Palau contestant
- Rick and Bubba, radio/TV personalities
- Wayne Rogers, actor
- Dorothy Sebastian, film actress
- Daniel Scheinert, music video and film director
- Glenn Shadix, actor (Bessemer, Alabama)
- Rickey Smiley, radio personality
- Trinity the Tuck, drag queen
- Roy Wood, Jr., comedian
- Byron York, conservative author and journalist
- Tom York, television personality

=== Music ===
- Inez Andrews, gospel singer
- Barry Beckett, pianist and record producer
- Adolphus Bell, electric blues musician, best known as a one-man band
- Benny Benjamin, drummer
- Bo Bice, singer, American Idol runner-up (Helena, Alabama)
- Helvetia Boswell, singer with The Boswell Sisters
- Piney Brown, R&B and blues singer-songwriter
- Oteil Burbridge, bassist
- Dorothy Love Coates, gospel singer
- J.R. Cobb, songwriter and guitarist
- Sam Dees, soul music singer
- Diana DeGarmo, American Idol 3rd season runner-up
- Big Joe Duskin, blues pianist
- Dennis Edwards, soul music singer
- Erra, progressive metalcore band
- Al Gallodoro, jazz saxophonist and clarinetist
- Gucci Mane, rapper
- Hardrock Gunter, rockabilly pioneer
- Lionel Hampton, vibraphonist and bandleader
- Emmylou Harris, singer
- Erskine Hawkins, composer, trumpeter and bandleader
- Haywood Henry, jazz saxophonist / clarinetist
- Taylor Hicks, soul music singer, American Idol winner
- Odetta Holmes, folk singer
- Jo Jones, jazz drummer
- Bill Justis, musician
- Eddie Kendricks, soul music singer
- William King, singer, founding member of The Commodores
- Baker Knight, songwriter and bandleader
- Sammy Lowe, jazz trumpeter and arranger
- Rebecca Luker, Broadway singer, actress
- Hugh Martin, songwriter and film composer
- Maylene and the Sons of Disaster, Southern rock/metalcore band
- Johnny O'Neal, jazz pianist
- Avery Parrish, composer and jazz pianist
- Hank Penny, Western swing musician
- Ray Reach, jazz vocalist and pianist
- St. Paul and The Broken Bones, neo soul band
- Dan Sartain, rock musician
- Johnny Smith, jazz guitarist
- Ruben Studdard, singer, American Idol winner
- Sun Ra, jazz composer and bandleader
- Maria Taylor, singer
- Through the Sparks, indie rock band
- Verbena, indie rock band
- Virgos Merlot, hard rock band
- Wild Sweet Orange, indie rock band
- Paul Williams, soul singer
- Tammy Wynette, country singer
- YBN Nahmir (Nick Simmons), rap/hip hop artist
- Jerry Yester, singer

== Government, law and politics ==
- Arthur Alber, Los Angeles City Council member, 1927–29
- John Amari, District 10 Circuit Court judge, former member of both houses of the Alabama State Legislature
- Douglas Arant, attorney and co-founder of Bradley Arant Boult & Cummings
- Richard Arrington, first African-American mayor of Birmingham
- B. B. Comer, former governor of Alabama
- Eugene "Bull" Connor, former commissioner of Public Safety
- Hugh Culverhouse, lawyer and owner of Tampa Bay Buccaneers
- Russell McWhortor Cunningham, governor of Alabama
- Mike Fair, Oklahoma state legislator
- John Grenier, Republican politician in Alabama
- Art Hanes, mayor of Birmingham
- Gil Hill, Detroit, Michigan city council president and actor
- Perry O. Hooper, Sr., 27th chief justice of the Alabama Supreme Court; born in Birmingham in 1925; later lived in Montgomery
- Bernard Kincaid, mayor of Birmingham
- Michael Landsberry, Marine and math teacher
- Raymond Lee Lathan, Wisconsin state legislator
- Helen Shores Lee, District 10 Circuit Court judge, first African-American woman to serve
- Chris McNair, Alabama state legislator and businessman
- Warren A. Morton, Wyoming state legislator
- Bert Nettles, lawyer in Birmingham; Republican member of the Alabama House of Representatives from Mobile (1969–1974)
- Charles Redding Pitt, chairman of Alabama Democratic Party
- Cecil F. Poole, federal judge, U.S. Court of Appeals for Ninth Circuit
- Condoleezza Rice, United States secretary of state
- George G. Siebels, Jr., first Republican to serve as mayor of Birmingham (1967–1975)
- Luther Strange, attorney general of Alabama 2011–2017 and former senator of Alabama, born in Birmingham
- Margaret Tutwiler, diplomat
- Randall Woodfin, mayor of Birmingham
- Robert S. Vance, chairman of Democratic Party, plaintiff's lawyer, federal judge United States Court of Appeals for the Eleventh Circuit

=== United States Senate ===
- Hugo Black (1927–1937), also Supreme Court justice (1937–1971)
- B. B. Comer (1920), also governor of Alabama (1907–1911)
- Joseph Forney Johnston (1907–1913)
- Doug Jones (2018–2021)
- Richard Shelby (1987–2023)
- Luther Strange (2017–2018)
- Oscar W. Underwood (1915–1927)
- Francis S. White (1914–1915)

=== United States House of Representatives ===
- Truman H. Aldrich (Alabama's 8th congressional district, 1896)
- Spencer Bachus (6th District, 1993–2015)
- John H. Bankhead (6th District, 1887–1907)
- Laurie C. Battle (9th District, 1947–1955)
- Sydney J. Bowie
- John H. Buchanan, Jr. (6th District, 1965–1981)
- Reuben Chapman (6th District, 1843–1847)
- Newton Nash Clements (6th District, 1880–1881)
- Williamson Robert Winfield Cobb (6th District, 1847–1861)
- Artur Davis (7th District, 1982–1992)
- Edward deGraffenried (6th District, 1949–1953)
- William Henry Denson (7th District, 1893–1895)
- Jack Edwards (1st District, 1965–1985)
- Ben Erdreich (6th District, 1983–1993)
- Claude Harris, Jr. (7th District, 1987–1993)
- Thomas Haughey (6th District, 1867–1869)
- Goldsmith W. Hewitt (6th District, 1876–1879, 1881–1885)
- Earl F. Hilliard (7th District, 1993–2003)
- Richmond P. Hobson (6th District, 1907–1915)
- George Huddleston (9th District, 1913–1935)
- George Huddleston, Jr. (9th District, 1955–1963)
- Pete Jarman (6th District, 1937–1949)
- Burwell Boykin Lewis (6th District, 1879–1880)
- Elaine Luria (VA 2nd District, 2019–2023), and former United States Navy commander
- John Mason Martin (6th District, 1885–1887)
- John P. Newsome (9th District, 1943–1945)
- William B. Oliver (6th District, 1915–1937)
- Luther Patrick (9th District, 1935–1943, 1945–1947)
- Armistead I. Selden, Jr. (6th District, 1953–1965)
- Terri Sewell (7th district, 2011–present)
- Richard Shelby (7th District, 1979–1987)
- William Crawford Sherrod (6th District, 1869–1871)
- Joseph Humphrey Sloss (6th District, 1871–1875)
- Albert L. Smith, Jr. (6th District, 1981–1983)
- Jesse F. Stallings
- Louis Washington Turpin (9th District, 1893–1895)
- Oscar W. Underwood (8th District, 1895–1896; 9th District 1897–1915)

== Math, science, and technology ==
- Mary Anderson, inventor of windshield wipers
- Andrew Jackson Beard, inventor of automatic railcar coupling
- Edward M. Burgess, chemist and inventor of the Burgess reagent
- Lawrence J. DeLucas, biophysical engineer; Space Shuttle Columbia astronaut
- Annie Easley, mathematician and rocket scientist
- Clyde Foster, scientist and mathematician
- Thelma Perry, microbiologist and mycologist
- E. O. Wilson, entomologist and author

== Medicine ==
- James Andrews, orthopedic specialist
- Louise Branscomb, physician and surgeon
- Tinsley Harrison, editor of first five editions of Harrison's Principals of Internal Medicine, dean of UAB School of Medicine
- Alan Heldman, interventional cardiologist and pioneer of the drug eluting stent
- John W. Kirklin, heart surgeon
- Larry Lemak, orthopedic surgeon, owner of the Lemak Group
- Albert Pacifico, heart surgeon
- Michael Saag, AIDS researcher
- Luther Leonidas Terry, Surgeon General of the United States

== Sports ==
- Mario Addison, NFL player
- Mike Anderson, University of Arkansas men's basketball coach
- Jay Barker, football player, college and pro quarterback
- Sarah Ashlee Barker, WNBA player
- Charles Barkley, basketball player, Hall of Famer and TV personality (Leeds, Alabama)
- Gene Bartow, basketball coach and athletic director for University of Alabama at Birmingham
- Bruce Benedict, born in Birmingham, Major League Baseball player
- Cornelius Bennett, NFL Pro-Bowler
- Eric Bledsoe, basketball player for the New Orleans Pelicans
- Neil Bonnett, born in Birmingham, Hall of Fame NASCAR driver, TV personality
- Th-resa Bostick, born in Birmingham, IFBB professional bodybuilder
- Lyman Bostock, born in Birmingham, Major League Baseball player
- Bobby Bowden, football coach
- Debbie Bramwell-Washington, IFBB professional bodybuilder
- Dieter Brock, Quarterback NFL Los Angeles Rams and CFL Winnipeg Blue Bombers
- Levert Carr, football player
- Bubba Church, born in Birmingham, Major League Baseball player
- Jared Cook, born in Birmingham, football player, tight end
- Ted Cook, football player
- Jerricho Cotchery, football player, Pittsburgh Steelers wide receiver
- Ed Daniel (born 1990), basketball player who plays for Israeli team Maccabi Ashdod
- Karlos Dansby, football player
- Marcell Dareus, football player for Buffalo Bills
- A. J. Davis, NFL player
- Mike Davis, UAB basketball coach
- Spud Davis, born in Birmingham, Major League Baseball player
- Tom Drake, born in Birmingham, Major League Baseball player
- Vonetta Flowers, bobsledder, Olympic gold medalist
- Vince Gibson, football coach
- Harry Gilmer, football player
- Alex Grammas, born in Birmingham, Major League Baseball player
- Hubie Green, professional golfer
- Jerry Hairston, Sr., born in Birmingham, Major League Baseball player
- Samuel H. Hairston, baseball player
- Darrin Hancock, NBA player
- Trey Hardee, NCAA Division I track and field collegiate heptathlon and decathlon record holder, Olympian
- Walt Harris, MMA fighter
- Chandler Hoffman, born in Birmingham, United Soccer League player
- Bobby Humphrey, football player, Alabama and NFL
- Tina Hutchinson (born 1964/1965), basketball player
- Bo Jackson, 1985 Heisman Trophy winner, multi-sport athlete
- Ron Jackson, born in Birmingham, Major League Baseball player
- Desmond Jennings, baseball player
- Ken Jordan, football player
- Smylie Kaufman, golfer
- Larry Kenon, born in Birmingham, basketball player
- Corey Kluber, Major League Baseball pitcher, Cy Young Award winner
- Carl Lewis, born in Birmingham, multiple Olympic gold-medalist and world champion track-and-field athlete
- Theodore Long, general manager of WWE Smackdown
- Nealy Martin, soccer player
- Larry Mason, football player
- Lee May, born in Birmingham, Major League Baseball player
- Willie Mays, Major League Baseball player, Hall of Famer
- KJ McDaniels, NBA player
- Larry McReynolds, announcer for NASCAR on FOX
- Charlie Moore, baseball player
- Tony Nathan, football player and coach
- Gus Niarhos, born in Birmingham, Major League Baseball player
- Satchel Paige, Major League Baseball player
- Sam Raben (born 1997), soccer player
- Chris Richards, born in Birmingham, professional soccer player for Crystal Palace of the English Premier League and the United States national team
- David Robertson, Major League Baseball player
- Oliver Robinson, basketball player
- Erk Russell, football player
- Ed Salem, football player and Birmingham restaurateur
- Jason Standridge, Major League Baseball player
- Ronald Steele, basketball player
- Rebel Steiner, football player
- Pat Sullivan, 1971 Heisman Trophy winner and former head football coach at Samford University
- Dabo Swinney, born in Birmingham, Clemson University head football coach
- Tanner Tessmann, professional soccer player, United States international, and Olympian
- Bryan Thomas, born in Birmingham, linebacker for New York Jets, graduated from Minor High School
- Dan Thomas, Major League Baseball player for Milwaukee Brewers
- Andre Tippett, NFL Hall of Fame linebacker
- Tommy Tolleson, NFL player
- Virgil Trucks, born in Birmingham, Major League Baseball player
- Bob Veale, born in Birmingham, Major League Baseball player
- Dixie Walker, Major League Baseball player
- Peahead Walker, born in Birmingham, football coach
- Adam Warren, Major League Baseball pitcher
- Cat Whitehill, U.S Women’s National Soccer team player
- Austin Wiley (born 1999), basketball player for Hapoel Jerusalem of the Israeli Basketball Premier League
- JaCorey Williams (born 1994), basketball player for Hapoel Jerusalem of the Israeli Basketball Premier League
- Chris Woods, player of gridiron football
- Al Worthington, born in Birmingham, Major League Baseball player
- John Zimmerman, professional pairs figure skater

== Other ==
- Mel Allen, radio and TV sports personality, primary play-by-play announcer for New York Yankees
- Mother Angelica, nun and founder of global Catholic network EWTN
- Robert Joseph Baker, bishop of the Catholic Diocese of Birmingham
- Donald Beatty, aviator, explorer and inventor
- Donald Broadnax, serial killer on Alabama’s death row
- Angela Davis, activist
- Deidre Downs, Miss America 2005
- Samantha Francis, contestant on America's Next Top Model, Cycle 8
- Victor Gold, journalist, formerly with The Birmingham News
- Lola Hendricks, civil rights activist
- Patti Ruffner Jacobs, suffragist and social reformer
- Robert B. McNeill, Presbyterian minister
- James Meissner, World War I flying ace
- Artemus Ogletree, victim of 1935 unsolved murder in Kansas City

Cleophus Prince Jr., serial killer on death row in California

- Joseph Raya, archbishop and social activist
- Wallace Rayfield, architect
- Sonia Sanchez, poet, activist, and educator
- Jay Sebring, hair stylist, Charles Manson victim, ex-boyfriend of Sharon Tate
- Courtney Shropshire, founder of Civitan International
- Fred Shuttlesworth, civil rights activist
- Haleigh Stidham, Miss Alabama USA 2006
- Abbie Stockard, Miss America 2025
- Heather Whitestone, Miss America 1995
- Louise Wooster, famed madam

== See also ==
- List of people from Alabama
