= Robert MacNeil (disambiguation) =

Robert MacNeil (1931–2024) was a Canadian-American novelist and television news anchor and journalist.

Robert MacNeil or McNeil or McNeill or McNeal may also refer to:

- Robert Duncan McNeill (born 1964), actor, producer and director
- Robert H. McNeill (1917–2005), African American photographer
- Bobby McNeal (1891–1956), English footballer for West Bromwich Albion and the England national team
- Robert Norman McNeill, MP in the Northern Ireland parliament for Queen's University of Belfast
- Robert McNeill (footballer) (1873–?), Scottish footballer for Sunderland and Greenock Morton
- Bob McNeil (footballer) (1891–1948), Scottish footballer for Hamilton Academical and Chelsea
- Bob McNeil (journalist) (1942–2024), New Zealand television journalist
- Bob McNeill (born 1938), basketball player
- Robert H. McNeal (1930–1988), historian and author
- Bobby McNeil (born 1962), Scottish footballer
- Robert L. McNeil Jr. (1915–2010), American chemist and pharmaceutical industry executive
- Robert B. McNeill (1915–1975), Presbyterian minister
- Robbie MacNeill (born 1946 or 1947), Canadian musician

== See also ==
- J. R. McNeill (John Robert McNeill, born 1954), environmental historian
- Robert McNeill Alexander (1934–2016), British zoologist
