= Waverly, Alabama =

- Town
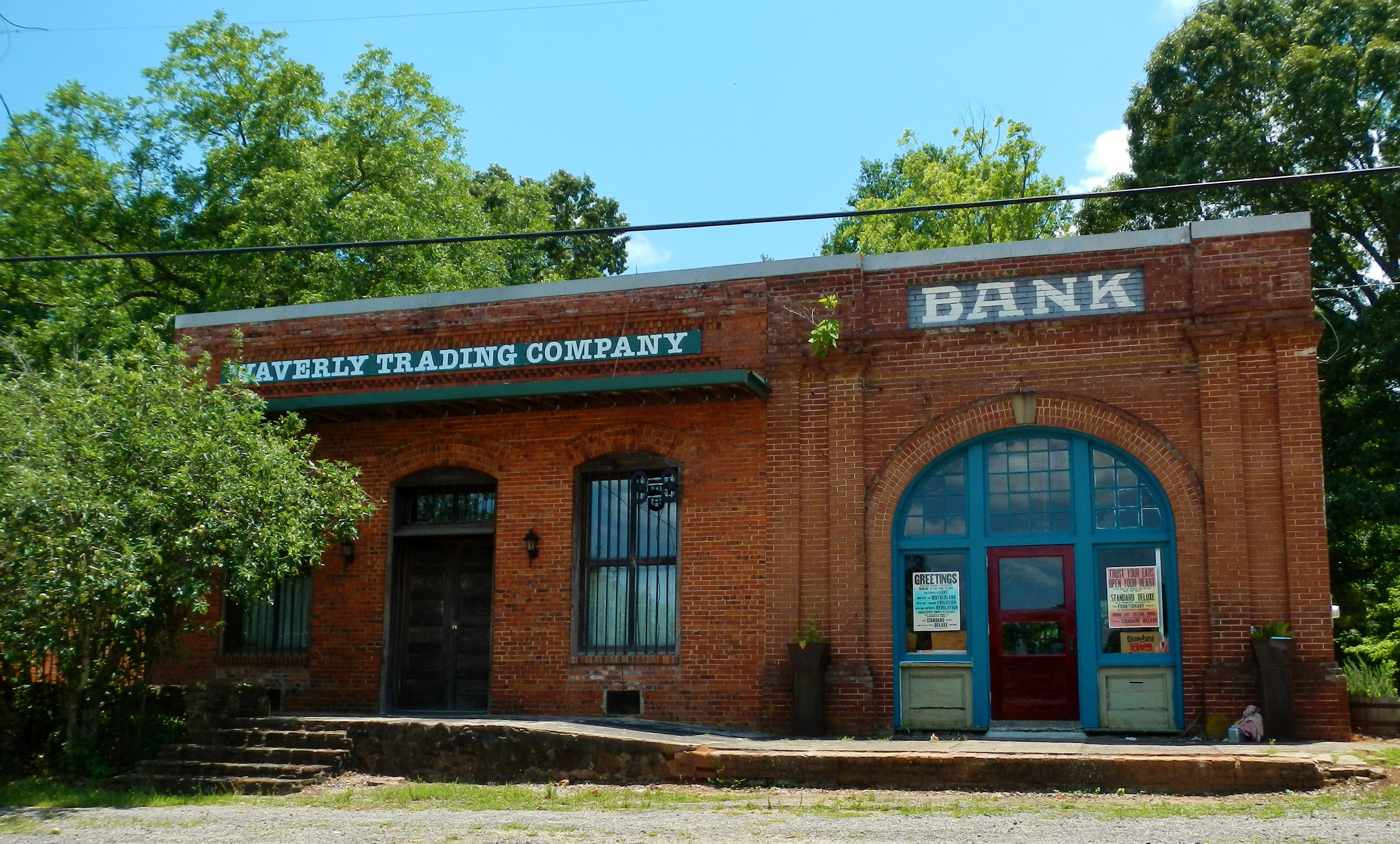
- Waverly in 2012

- Location of Waverly in Chambers County and Lee County, Alabama.
- Coordinates: 32°44′00″N 85°34′35″W
- Country: United States
- State: Alabama
- Counties: Chambers, Lee

Area
  - Total: 2.79 sq mi (7.22 km^{2})
  - Land: 2.77 sq mi (7.17 km^{2})
  - Water: 0.019 sq mi (0.05 km^{2})
- Elevation: 771 ft (235 m)

Population (2020)
  - Total: 159
  - Density: 57.4/sq mi (22.17/km^{2})
- Time zone: UTC-6 (CST)
  - Summer (DST): UTC-5 (CDT)
- ZIP code: 36879
- Area code: 334
- FIPS code: 01-80256
- GNIS feature ID: 2406842
- Website: townofwaverlyal.org

Waverly is a town in Chambers and Lee counties in the U.S. state of Alabama. It is part of the Auburn Metropolitan Area. It was incorporated in 1910. As of the 2020 census, Waverly had a population of 159.

== History ==
Waverly was settled in the 1830s, but saw little growth until the 1870s. The name of Waverly, Alabama first appeared on Alabama maps in 1853 (see reference below). It was given the nickname, Pea Ridge, but this was never its official name.

== Annual Town Bar-B-Q ==
Beginning October 1990, and the second Saturday of each October since, the Town of Waverly hosts the Annual Waverly BBQ. Both pork and chicken BBQ, home made cakes and other sweets, cols, ice tea and lemonade are served. Town members all pitch in cooking, preparing the food,'stirring' the stew pot (a local tradition), and smoking the BBQ with hickory wood from the Friday night prior to the 'BBQ Day' at approximately 5:00pm, and continue this tradition until all the BBQ and stew is sold. Food is served to all attendees from 10:00am until 3:00pm. The event hosts singers, dancers, artists, arts and crafts, petting zoos, and other such events. This town get together serves as one of Waverly's largest fundraising events.

== The Old 280 Boogie ==
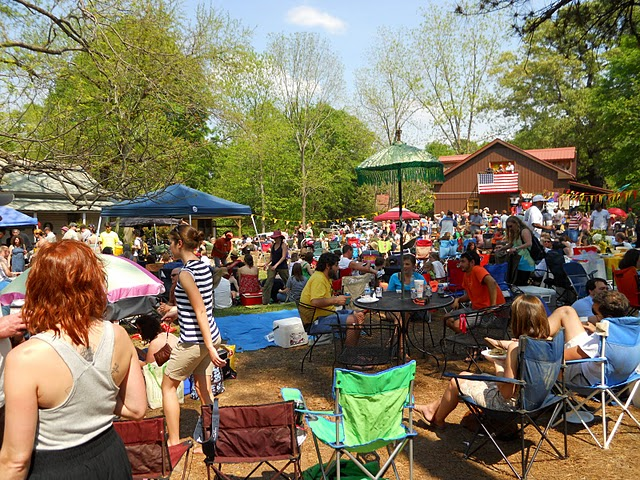
The Old 280 Boogie; April 17, 2010.

In 2000, the State of Alabama rerouted U.S. Highway 280 south of the town of Waverly instead of routing it through town. This decision meant the town was saved from destruction. To celebrate, residents in 2001 decided to hold an annual "Waverly Boogie" (or "Old 280 Boogie"), a multi-cultural festival typically held on the third Saturday in April. The event, featuring a wide variety of musicians and visual artists, is held in an open-air amphitheater.

The 2014 event was held on April 19, 2014; a Fall Boogie was held on September 13. Additionally, in 2014, Standard Deluxe hosted its first annual Heart of Waverly Bluegrass Festival.

== Geography ==
Waverly is in the southwest corner of Chambers County. The town limits extend south into Lee County. According to the United States Census Bureau, the town has a total area of 2.7 square miles (7.1 km^{2}), of which 0.02 square miles (0.05 km^{2}), or 0.68%, is water.

U.S. Route 280 runs southwest of downtown, leading southeast 14 mi (23 km) to Opelika and northwest 13 mi (21 km) to Dadeville.

== Demographics ==
Historical population
| Census | Pop. | Note | %± |
|---|---|---|---|
| 1920 | 208 | | — |
| 1930 | 383 | | 84.1% |
| 1940 | 321 | | −16.2% |
| 1950 | 306 | | −4.7% |
| 1960 | 250 | | −18.3% |
| 1970 | 247 | | −1.2% |
| 1980 | 228 | | −7.7% |
| 1990 | 152 | | −33.3% |
| 2000 | 184 | | 21.1% |
| 2010 | 145 | | −21.2% |
| 2020 | 159 | | 9.7% |
U.S. Decennial Census; 2013 Estimate

As of the census of 2000, there were 184 people, 76 households and 50 families living in the town. The population density was 67.3 inhabitants per square mile (26.0/km^{2}). There were 87 housing units at an average density of 31.8 per square mile (12.3/km^{2}). The racial makeup of the town was 80.98% White and 19.02% Black or African American.

There were 76 households, out of which 28.9% had children under the age of 18 living with them, 52.6% were married couples living together, 11.8% had a female householder with no husband present, and 32.9% were non-families. 32.9% of all households were made up of individuals, and 14.5% had someone living alone who was 65 years of age or older. The average household size was 2.42 and the average family size was 3.12.

In the town, the population was spread out, with 24.5% under the age of 18, 7.6% from 18 to 24, 31.5% from 25 to 44, 20.1% from 45 to 64, and 16.3% who were 65 years of age or older. The median age was 38 years. For every 100 females, there were 102.2 males. For every 100 females age 18 and older, there were 95.8 males.

The median income for a household in the town was $32,917, and the median income for a family was $38,750. Males had a median income of $26,625 while it was $16,071 for females. The per-capita income for the town was $18,406. About 3.7% of families and 7.6% of the population were below the poverty line, including none of those younger than 18 or 65 or older.

== Notable person ==
- Douglas Arant, Birmingham, Alabama lawyer

== Works or publications ==
- Nunn, Alexander (Ed.) (1983). Lee County and Her Forebears. Opelika, Al: Herff Jones. LCCCN 83-081693

== See also ==
- Standard Deluxe

== Photo gallery ==
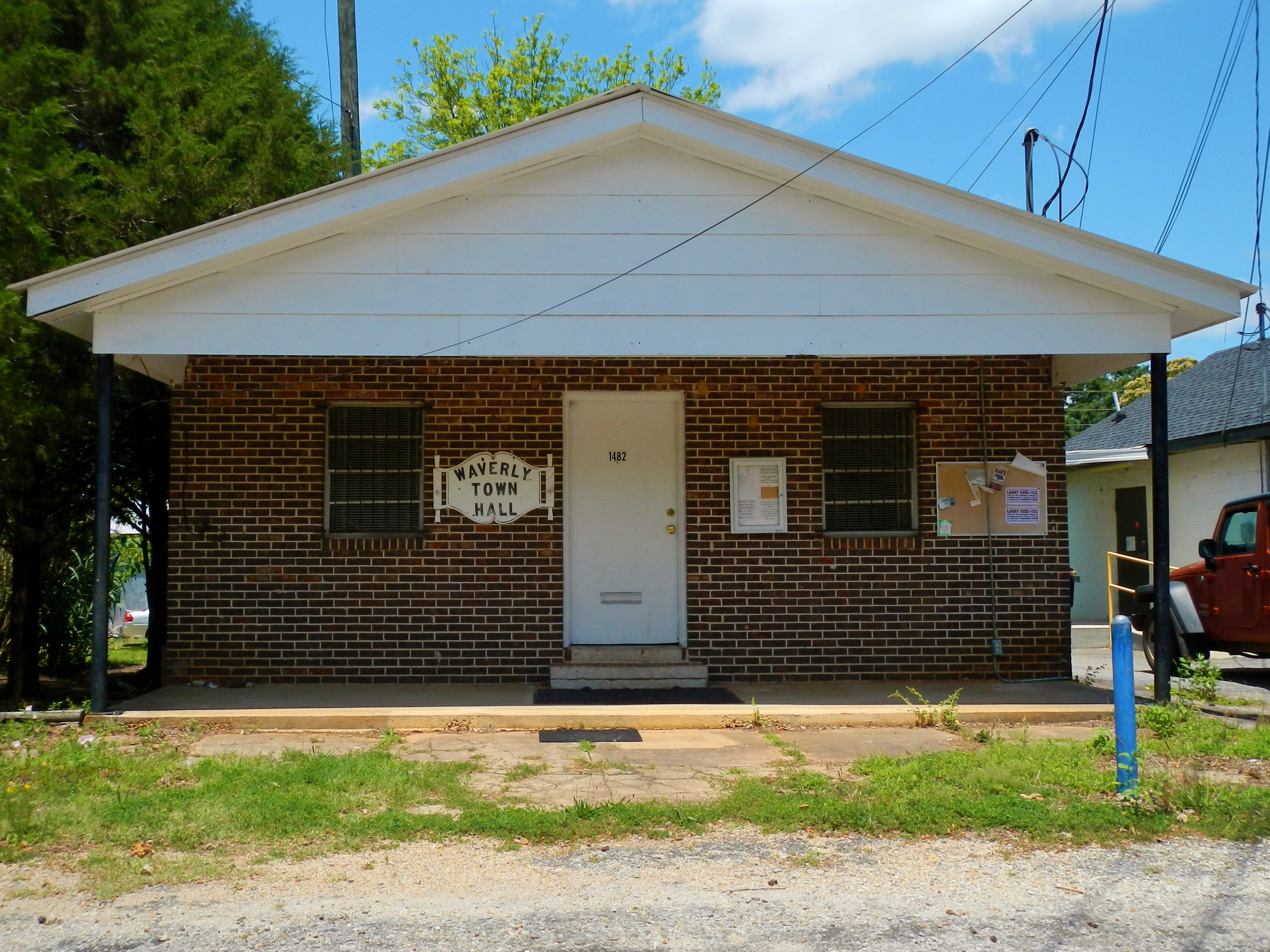
Waverly Town Hall

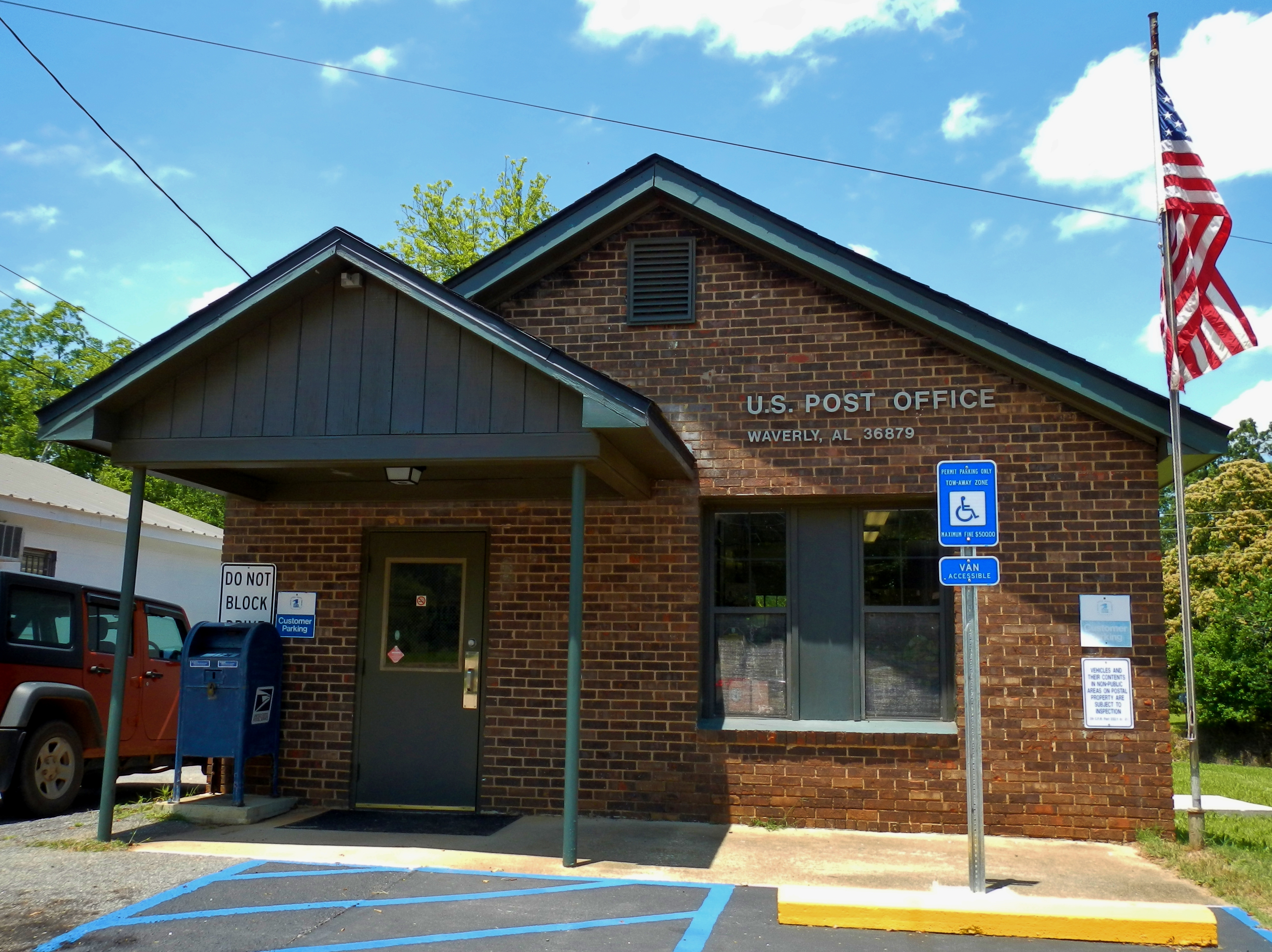
Waverly Post Office (ZIP code: 36879)

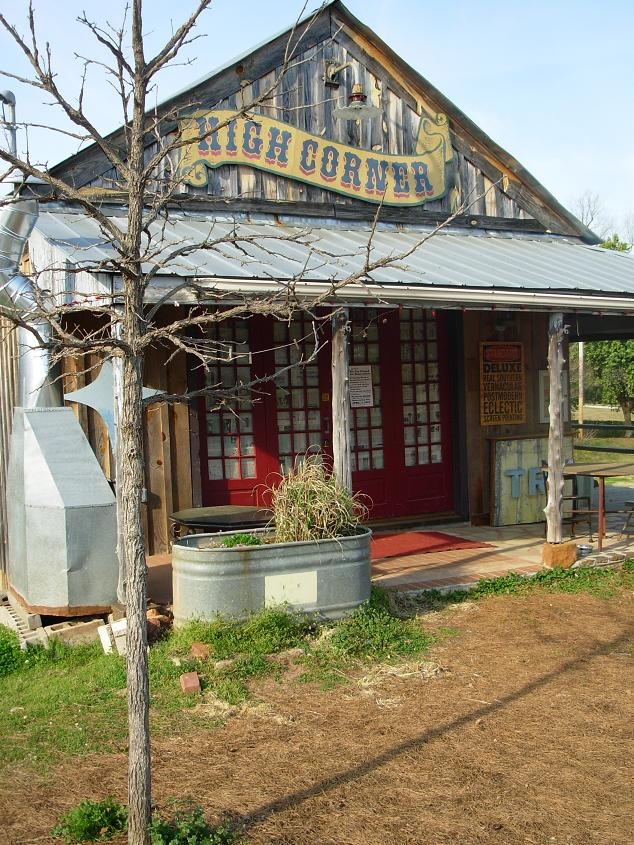
The Corner Co-Op (a Standard Deluxe Project 2001–2008)

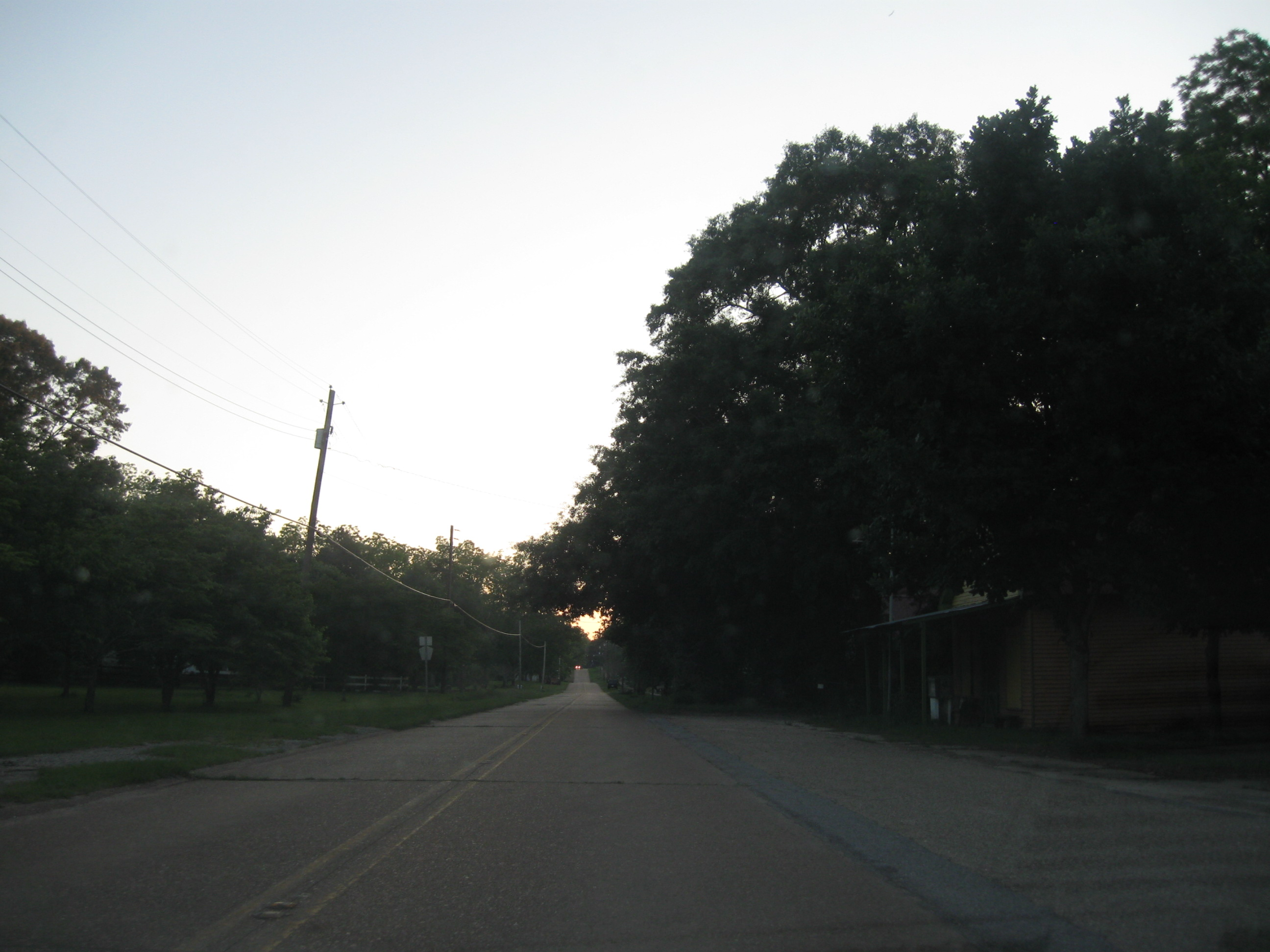
Looking west at dusk on old US 280 through Waverly

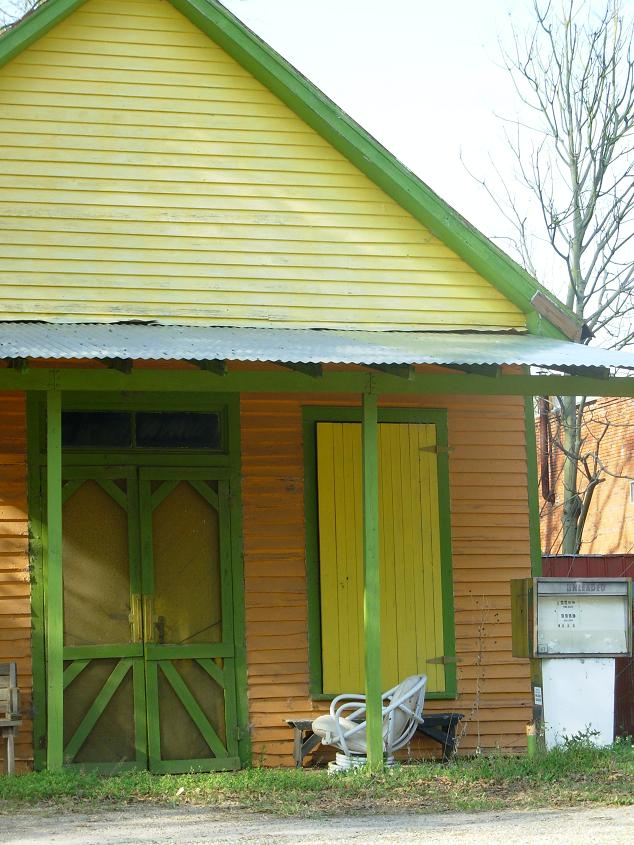
One of the brightly colored buildings in downtown Waverly

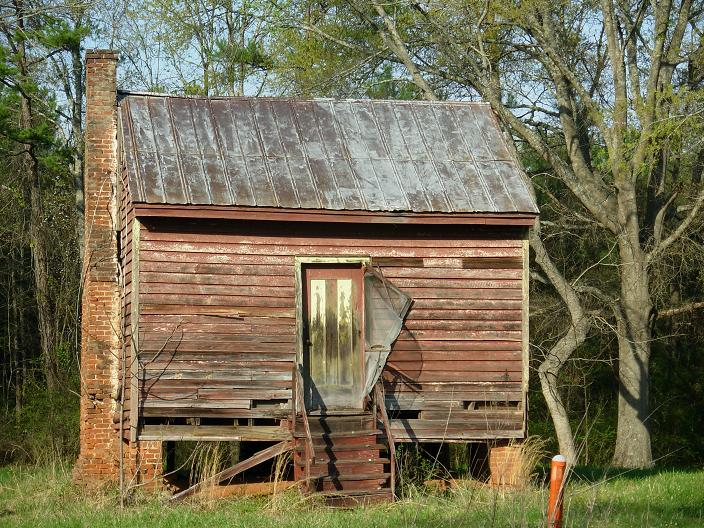
One of the uninhabited railroad houses that line the WPA Highway

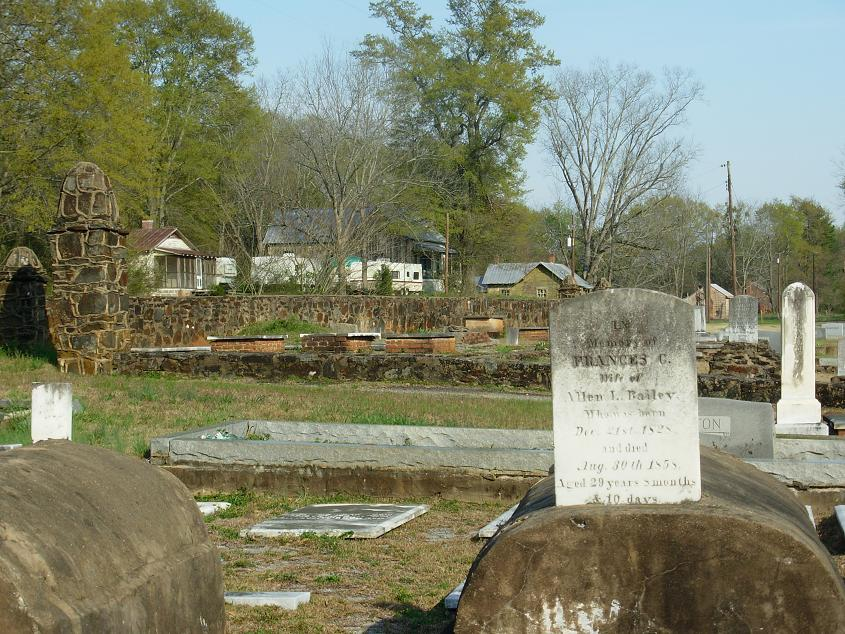
The Waverly Cemetery located along the scenic WPA Highway, now known simply as Patrick Street (Old 280)

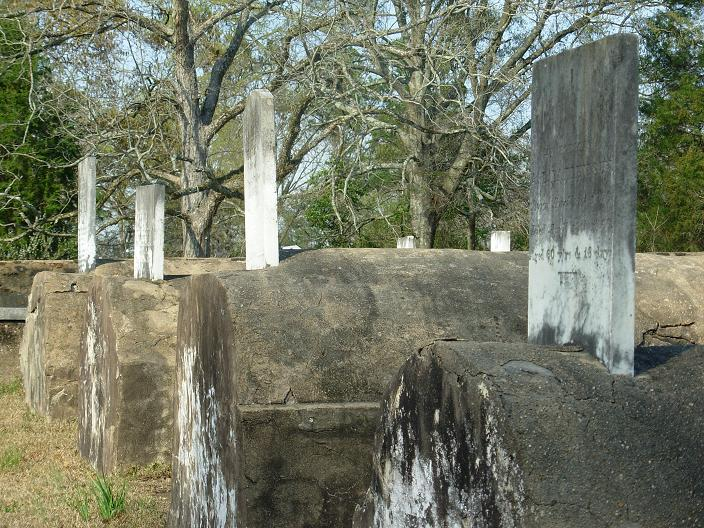
The above-ground tombs are among the oldest in the Waverly Cemetery.

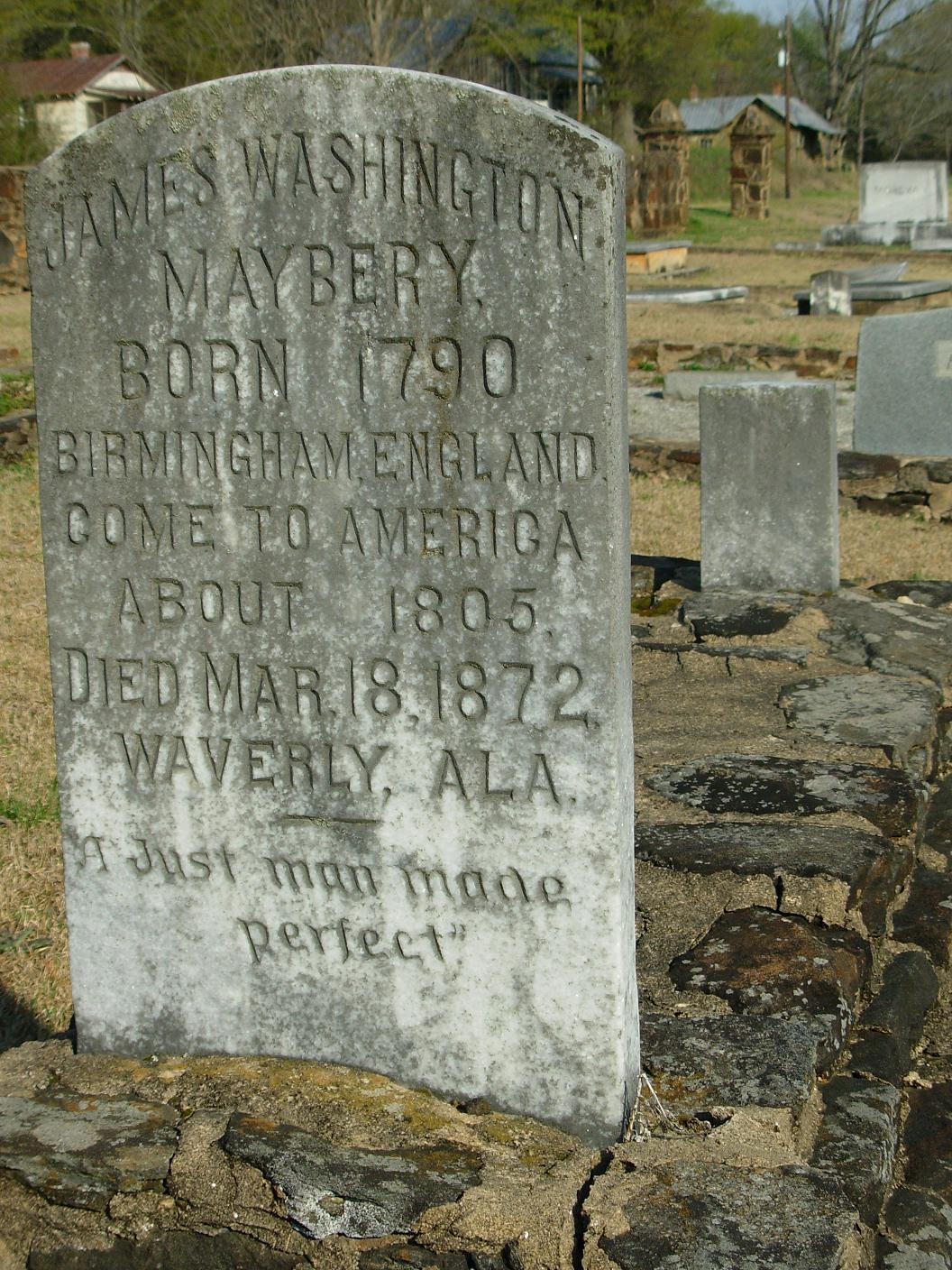
Detail of one of the older graves in the cemetery

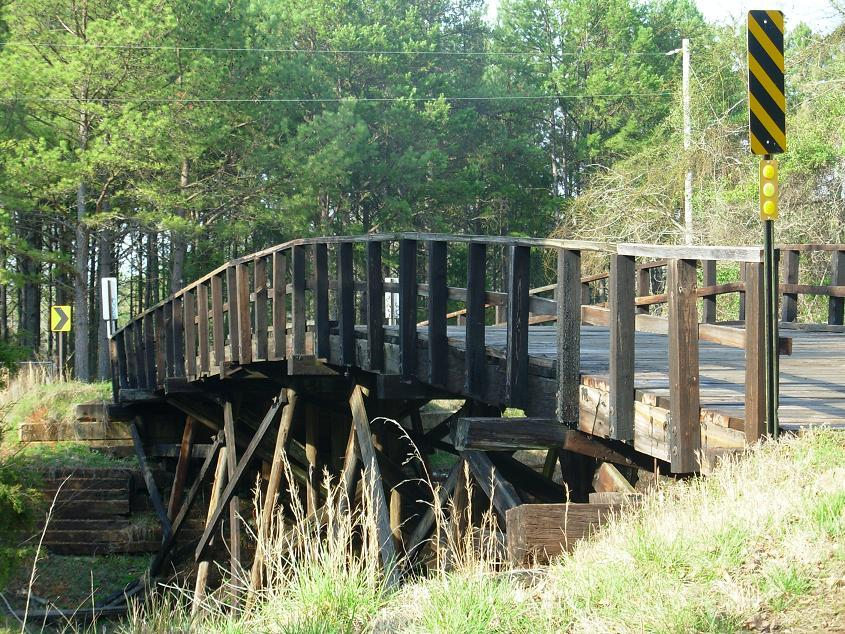
A wooden bridge crossing the railroad in eastern Waverly
