= List of New York Yankees no-hitters =

Don Larsen threw the only perfect game ever in MLB postseason play.

The New York Yankees are a Major League Baseball franchise based in the New York City borough of The Bronx. Also known in their early years as the "Baltimore Orioles" (1901–02) and the "New York Highlanders" (1903–1912), the Yankees have had twelve pitchers throw thirteen no-hitters in franchise history. A no-hitter is officially recognized by Major League Baseball only "...when a pitcher (or pitchers) allows no hits during the entire course of a game, which consists of at least nine innings. In a no-hit game, a batter may reach base via a walk, an error, a hit by pitch, a passed ball or wild pitch on strike three, or catcher's interference". No-hitters of fewer than nine complete innings were previously recognized by the league as official; however, several rule alterations in 1991 changed the rule to its current form. Four perfect games, a special subcategory of no-hitter, have been pitched in Yankees history. As defined by Major League Baseball, "in a perfect game, no batter reaches any base during the course of the game." This feat was achieved by Don Larsen in 1956, David Wells in 1998, David Cone in 1999, and Domingo German in 2023. Wells later claimed he was a "little hung-over" while throwing his perfect game.

George Mogridge threw the first no-hitter in Yankees history, beating their rival Boston Red Sox 2–1, their only no-hitter in which the opposition scored. Their most recent no-hitter was Domingo Germán's perfect game against the Oakland Athletics during the 2023 season on June 28. The Yankees' first perfect game was also thrown by a right-handed pitcher, Don Larsen, and came in Game 5 of the 1956 World Series. Larsen's perfect game was the only no-hitter in MLB postseason play until Roy Halladay of the Philadelphia Phillies pitched a no-hitter in Game 1 of the 2010 National League Division Series. Coincidentally, David Cone's perfect game came on "Yogi Berra Day" at Yankee Stadium. Berra had caught Larsen's perfect game and both he and Larsen were in the stands for the game. Of the twelve no-hitters pitched by Yankees players, three each have been won by the scores 4–0 and 2–0, more common than any other result. The largest margin of victory in a Yankees no-hitter was 13 runs in a 13–0 win by Monte Pearson. German's perfect game represented the second largest margin of victory in a Yankees no-hitter, as the Yankees defeated the Athletics 11–0 in the 24th perfect game in MLB history.

Andy Hawkins lost a game on July 1, 1990, while on the road against the Chicago White Sox by the score of 4–0 without allowing a hit. Because the White Sox were winning entering the ninth inning at home, they did not bat, and thus Hawkins pitched only 8 innings. The game was considered a no-hitter at the time, however, following rules changes in 1991, the game is no longer counted as a no-hitter. Additionally, Tom L. Hughes held the Cleveland Indians without a hit through the first nine innings of a game on August 6, 1910, but the game went into extra innings, he lost the no-hitter in the tenth inning, and ultimately lost the game 5–0.

The longest interval between Yankees no-hitters was between the game pitched by Larsen on October 8, 1956, and Dave Righetti's no hitter on July 4, 1983, encompassing 26 years, 8 months, and 26 days. The shortest gap between such games fell between Allie Reynolds' two no-hitters in 1951, a gap of just 2 months and 16 days from July 12 till September 28. Reynolds is the only Yankees pitcher to throw multiple no-hitters in his career, and one of only six pitchers in Major League history to throw multiple no-hitters in a season along with Max Scherzer in 2015, Roy Halladay in 2010, Nolan Ryan in 1973, Virgil Trucks in 1952, and Johnny Vander Meer in 1938. The Red Sox and the Cleveland Indians (now known as the Guardians) have been no-hit by the Yankees more than any other franchise, each doing so three times. Notably, Reynolds' two no-hit victims in 1951 were the Red Sox and the Indians.

No umpire has called multiple Yankee no-hitters. Bill Dinneen, the umpire who called Sad Sam Jones' 1923 no-hitter, is the only person in MLB history to both pitch (for the Red Sox in 1905) and umpire (five total, including Jones') a no-hitter. The plate umpire for Larsen's perfect game, Babe Pinelli, apocryphally "retired" after that game, but that is mere legend; in reality, since Larsen's perfecto was only Game 5 of the seven-game Series, Pinelli didn't officially retire until two days later, concluding his distinguished umpiring career at second base during Game 7, not at home plate during Game 5.

== No-hitters ==
Key
¶	Indicates a perfect game
£	Pitcher was left-handed

List of New York Yankees no-hitters
#	Date	Pitcher	Opponent	Final score	Base-runners	Notes	Ref
1	April 24, 1917	George Mogridge^{£}	@ Boston Red Sox	2–1	3	Smallest margin of victory in a Yankees no-hitter (tie)	
2	September 4, 1923	Sad Sam Jones	@ Philadelphia Athletics	2–0	2	Jones recorded no strikeouts through the entire game; Only baserunners were a walk in the first and an error in the eighth	
3	August 27, 1938	Monte Pearson	Cleveland Indians	13–0	2	First no-hitter in Yankee Stadium history; Second game of a doubleheader	
4	July 12, 1951	Allie Reynolds (1)	@ Cleveland Indians	1–0	3	Smallest margin of victory in a Yankees no-hitter (tie)	
5	September 28, 1951	Allie Reynolds (2)	Boston Red Sox	8–0	4	First game of a doubleheader; One of six pitchers to have more than one no-hitter in a season (Johnny Vander Meer, Virgil Trucks, Nolan Ryan, Roy Halladay, and Max Scherzer)	
6	October 8, 1956	Don Larsen^{¶}	Brooklyn Dodgers	2–0	0	Sixth perfect game in MLB history; Game 5 of the 1956 World Series; The first no-hitter and only perfect game thrown in a World Series.	
7	July 4, 1983	Dave Righetti^{£}	Boston Red Sox	4–0	4	Occurred on Yankee owner George Steinbrenner's 53rd birthday	
8	September 4, 1993	Jim Abbott^{£}	Cleveland Indians	4–0	5	Threw a no-hitter despite having been born without a right hand	
9	May 14, 1996	Dwight Gooden	Seattle Mariners	2–0	7	Last non-perfect no-hitter, thrown by a Yankee, in Old Yankee Stadium	
10	May 17, 1998	David Wells^{£¶}	Minnesota Twins	4–0	0	Second perfect game in Yankees history and 15th in MLB history	
11	July 18, 1999	David Cone^{¶}	Montreal Expos	6–0	0	Third perfect game in Yankees history and 16th in MLB history; First no-hitter and perfect game in interleague play; Occurred on Yogi Berra Day, with Don Larsen throwing out the first pitch to Berra	
12	May 19, 2021	Corey Kluber	@ Texas Rangers	2–0	1	First Yankees no-hitter in the 21st century; No-hit the Rangers, his former team, the year after playing for them; Only baserunner was a walk in the 3rd inning; Sixth no-hitter of the 2021 Major League Baseball season	
13	June 28, 2023	Domingo Germán^{¶}	@ Oakland Athletics	11–0	0	Fourth perfect game in Yankees history and 24th in MLB history	

== See also ==
- List of Major League Baseball no-hitters
