= Corey Kluber =

American baseball player (born 1986)

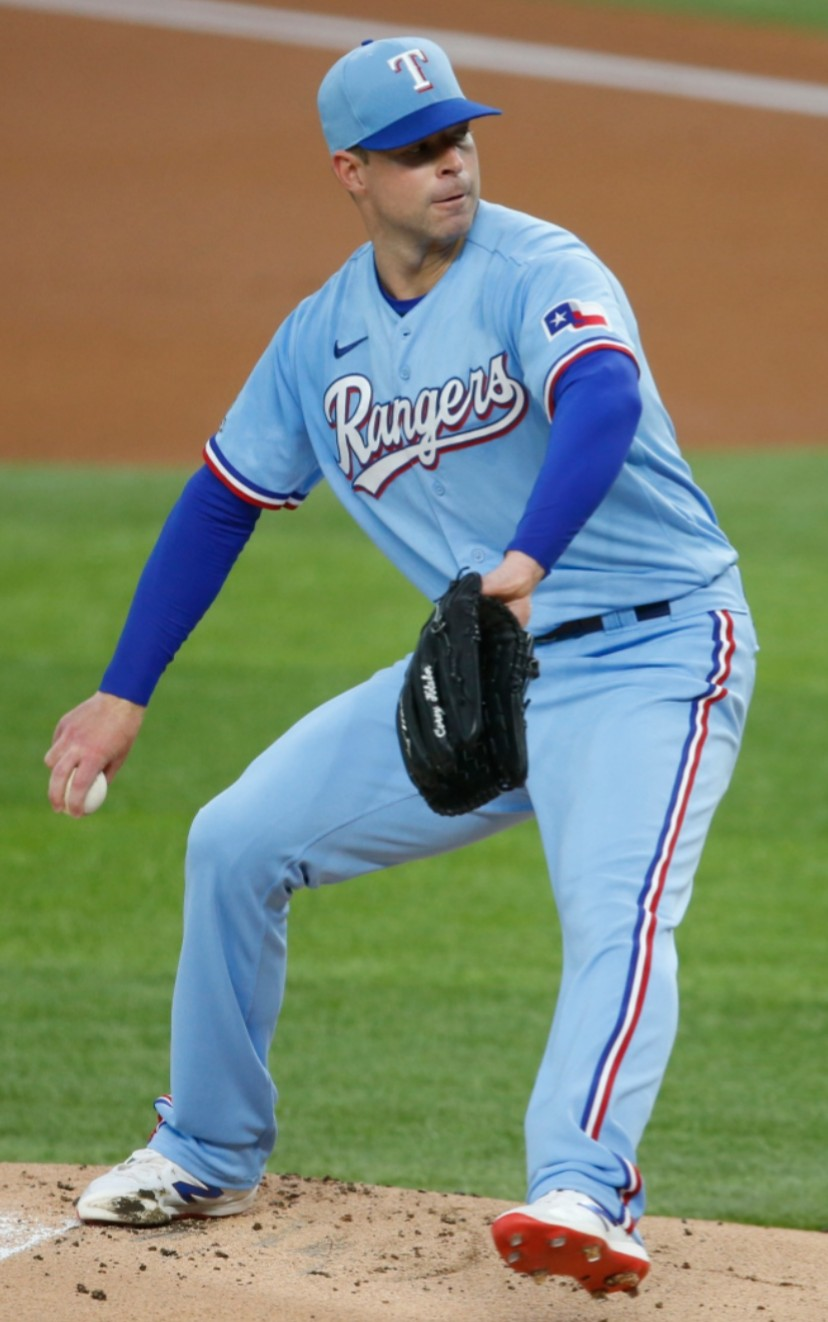
- Kluber with Texas Rangers in 2020
- Pitcher
- Born: April 10, 1986 (age 40); Birmingham, Alabama, U.S.
- Batted: Right Threw: Right

MLB debut
- September 1, 2011, for the Cleveland Indians

Last MLB appearance
- June 20, 2023, for the Boston Red Sox

MLB statistics
- Win–loss record: 116–77
- Earned run average: 3.44
- Strikeouts: 1,725
- Stats at Baseball Reference

Teams
- Cleveland Indians (2011–2019); Texas Rangers (2020); New York Yankees (2021); Tampa Bay Rays (2022); Boston Red Sox (2023)

Career highlights and awards
- 3× All-Star (2016–2018); 2× AL Cy Young Award (2014, 2017); 2× AL wins leader (2014, 2017); AL ERA leader (2017); Pitched a no-hitter on May 19, 2021

Corey Scott Kluber (born April 10, 1986) is an American former professional baseball pitcher. He played in Major League Baseball (MLB) for the Cleveland Indians, Texas Rangers, New York Yankees, Tampa Bay Rays and Boston Red Sox. He made his MLB debut in 2011 as a member of the Indians. A power pitcher, Kluber achieved high strikeout rates through a two-seam sinker and a breaking ball that variously resembled a slider and a curveball.

Born in Birmingham, Alabama, Kluber played high-school baseball for Coppell High School in Coppell, Texas. He then attended Stetson University in DeLand, Florida, where he was named Atlantic Sun Conference Pitcher of the Year in 2007, and was inducted into the Stetson Athletics Hall of Fame in 2014. The San Diego Padres selected Kluber in the fourth round of the 2007 draft, and traded him to the Indians in 2010 as part of a three-team transaction. Kluber established himself in the Indians' starting rotation in 2013. He was signed through 2020, with a club option for 2021, after agreeing to a five-year, $38.5 million contract extension with the Indians in April 2015. Following an injury-plagued 2019 season, the Indians traded Kluber to the Rangers in December 2019, where he missed most of the 2020 season with injuries, as well. He signed with the Yankees for the 2021 season and the Rays for the 2022 season.

A three-time MLB All-Star, Kluber is a two-time winner of the Cy Young Award in the American League (AL) including in 2014, his second full season in the major leagues, and in 2017. In 2016, he was named the Sporting News AL Starting Pitcher of the Year. He led the major leagues in earned run average (ERA) in 2017, and has twice led the AL in wins. On May 13, 2015, Kluber became one of 20 pitchers in major league history to strike out at least 18 batters in a nine-inning game, doing so versus the St. Louis Cardinals. In 2018, Kluber notched his first 20-win season. On May 19, 2021, Kluber threw a no-hitter against the Rangers.

== Early life ==
Kluber attended Coppell High School in Coppell, Texas. While pitching for the school's baseball team, Kluber developed a stress fracture in his elbow due to overuse by his coach Don English, requiring surgery and the insertion of two screws. He went unselected in the 2004 MLB draft.

Kluber began to draw notice from coaches at Stetson University, when he pitched at the World Wood Bat Championships in Jupiter, Florida.

== College career ==
He enrolled at Stetson, where he played college baseball for the Stetson Hatters baseball team in the Atlantic Sun Conference.

As a freshman in 2005, Kluber performed as a relief pitcher, compiling a 2–2 win–loss record with a 7.82 earned run average (ERA) in 25 innings pitched. As a sophomore, he produced a 6–5 win–loss record and a 3.61 ERA in 17 games, including 14 starts. In 2007, Kluber had a 12–2 win–loss record and a 2.05 ERA with 117 strikeouts. That year, he was named the Atlantic Sun Conference's Pitcher of the Year, a second team member of the 2007 Ping! Baseball All-American Team and a member the American Baseball Coaches Association All-Atlantic Region Second Team in 2007.

== Professional career ==
=== San Diego Padres ===
==== Minor leagues ====
The San Diego Padres selected Kluber in the fourth round of the 2007 MLB draft. Kluber signed with the Padres, receiving a $200,000 signing bonus. Kluber played for the Fort Wayne Wizards of the Single–A Midwest League in 2008. On August 25, 2008, he was named the Midwest League Pitcher of the Week.

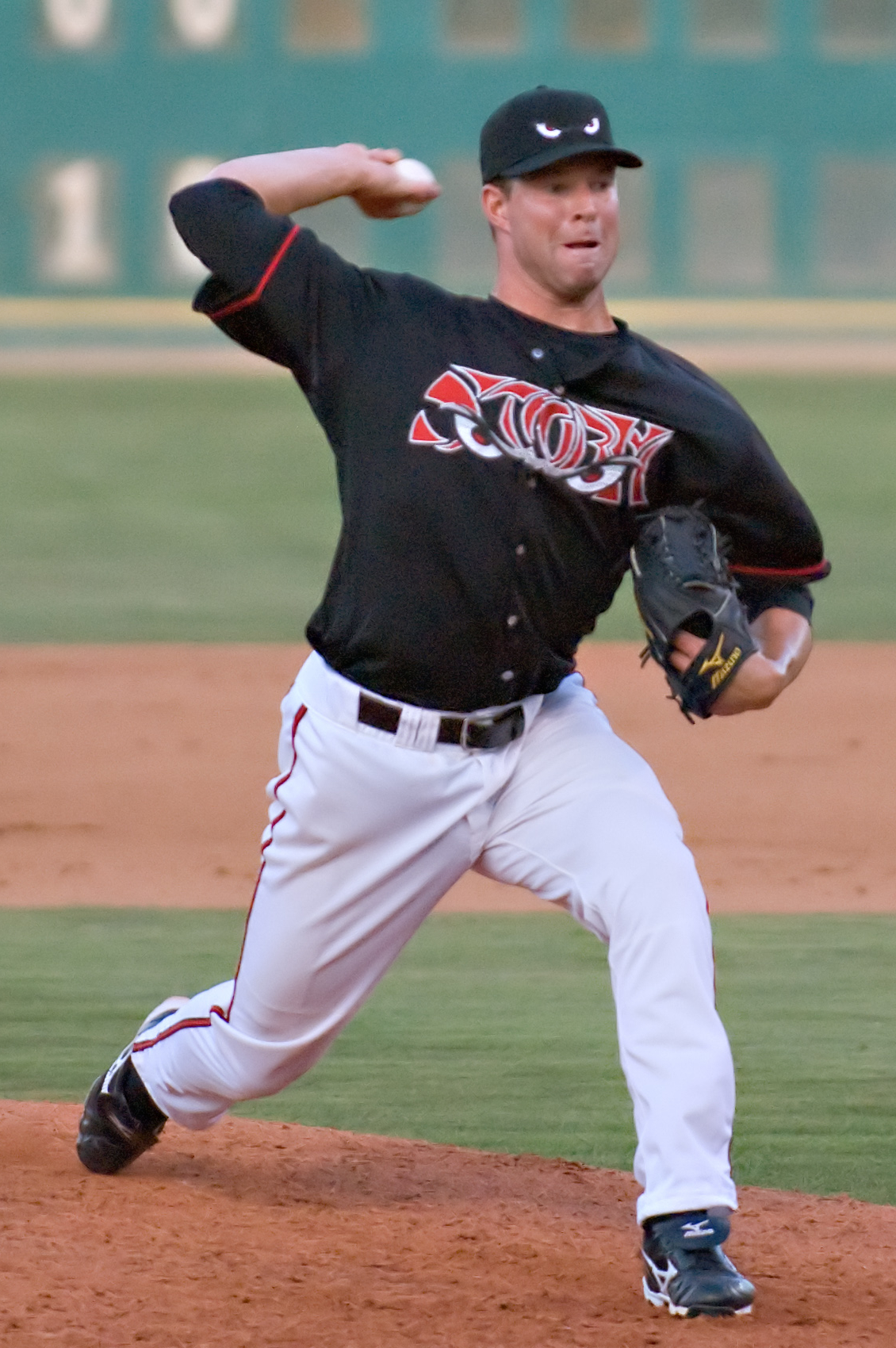
Kluber pitching for the Lake Elsinore Storm in 2008

Kluber played for the Lake Elsinore Storm of the High–A California League in 2009. On June 1, 2009, he was named the California League Pitcher of the Week. He received a promotion to the San Antonio Missions of the Double–A Texas League in 2009, finishing the year with an 11–13 win–loss record and a 4.55 ERA. On July 26, 2010, Kluber was named the Texas League Pitcher of the Week. He pitched to a 6–6 win–loss record with a 3.45 ERA with the Missions, while leading the Texas League in strikeouts.

=== Cleveland Indians ===
The Padres traded Kluber to the Cleveland Indians on July 31, 2010, in a three-team trade also involving the St. Louis Cardinals. Cleveland sent Jake Westbrook to the Cardinals while St. Louis sent Ryan Ludwick to the Padres. The Padres sent Nick Greenwood to the Cardinals, and the Indians paid $2.7 million of Westbrook's remaining salary. At the time of the trade, Kluber's minor league record was 18–24, and he was not ranked among the top thirty prospects in the Padres' farm system. The Indians assigned Kluber to the Akron Aeros of the Double-A Eastern League. After the 2010 season, he took part in the Indians' Winter Development Program. He was added to the Indians' 40-man roster after the season.

Kluber played for the Columbus Clippers of the Triple–A International League in 2011, pitching to a 7–11 win–loss record and a 5.56 ERA.

==== Major leagues ====
The Indians called him up on September 1, 2011, and made his major league debut that day. During a rain-induced bullpen session in May 2012, at the recommendation of Columbus pitching coach Ruben Niebla, Kluber first threw his two-seam fastball. Kluber was brought up from Columbus in August 2012 to replace starting pitcher Josh Tomlin in the Indians' rotation. Tomlin was moved to the bullpen.

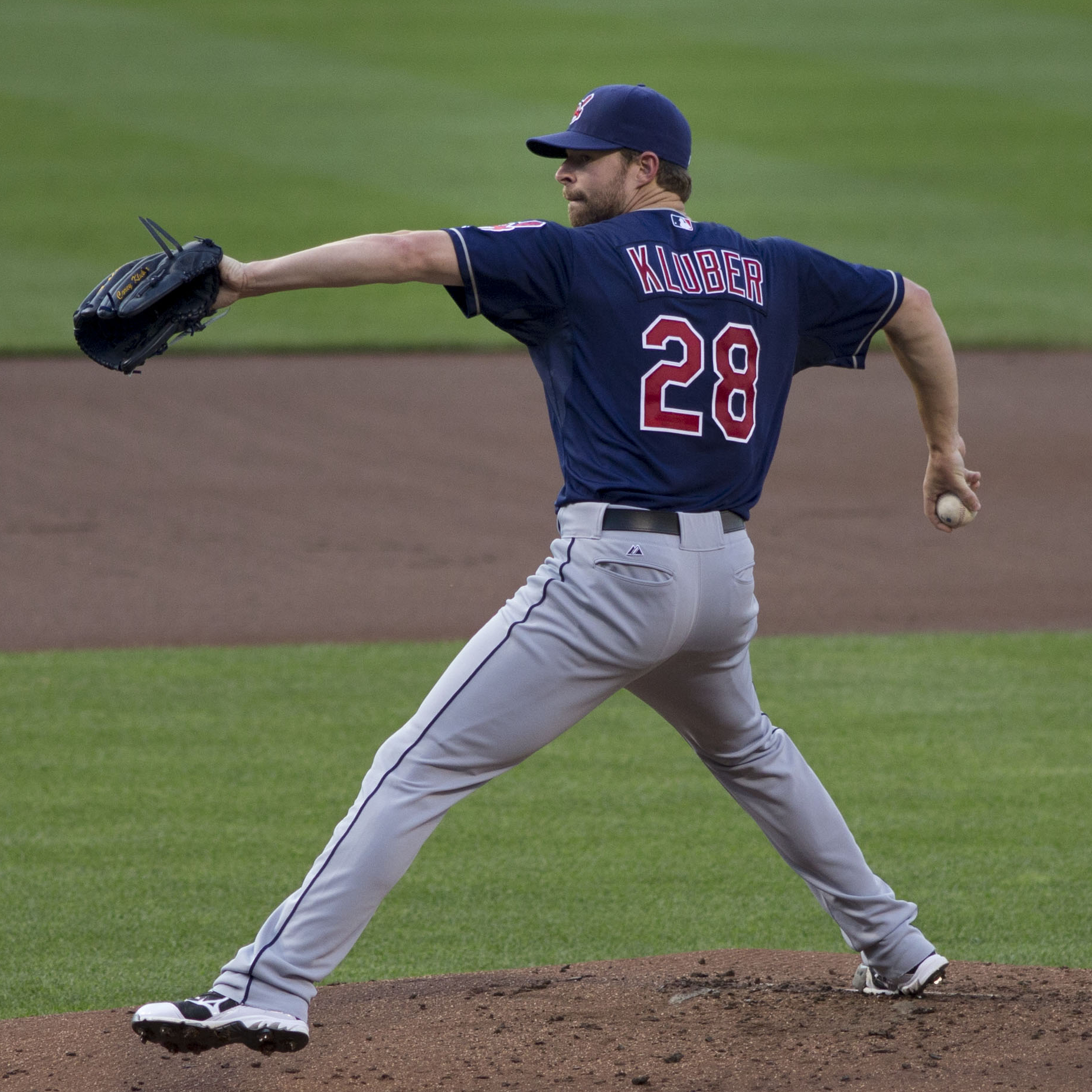
Kluber pitching for the Cleveland Indians in 2013

Kluber began the 2013 season with Columbus, but received a promotion when Brett Myers suffered an elbow injury. On June 16, 2013, Kluber threw eight shutout innings in a 2–0 victory over the Washington Nationals. He co-won the American League Player of the Week Award for the week ending June 16, 2013, sharing the honor with teammate Jason Kipnis. On September 22, 2013, Kluber became the first pitcher to strike out 14 batters in consecutive starts since Randy Johnson in 2004. He finished the season with an 11–5 record and a 3.85 ERA.

==== 2014 season: Cy Young Award ====
Kluber was named the American League Player of the Week on September 21, 2014, and the Pitcher of the Month for September 2014. He posted back-to-back 14 strikeout games as Cleveland stayed in contention late in the season for a wild card spot. His totals on the month included a 5–1 record, 2.09 ERA and 56 strikeouts. He finished the 2014 season with an 18–9 win–loss record and a 2.44 ERA. His 18 wins were tied with Max Scherzer and Jered Weaver for the most in the American League (AL), and his ERA was the third-best in the league. Additionally, Kluber led the AL in fielding-independent pitching. He also struck out 269 batters in 235 2/3 innings, good for second-best in the major leagues behind David Price's 271.

Though the Indians missed the playoffs, the 2014 season culminated with Kluber – in just his second full season – winning the AL Cy Young Award, beating Félix Hernández in a close vote. Kluber earned 17 of 30 first-place votes, with Hernandez getting the remaining 13. Kluber became the fourth Indians player to win the award, following Gaylord Perry, CC Sabathia, and Cliff Lee. He also became the lowest-drafted player (134th overall) since Bret Saberhagen in 1989 (480th) to win an AL Cy Young Award.

==== 2015 season ====
On April 5 Kluber signed a guaranteed five-year extension with an additional two option years, for a team-friendly $38.5 million. On signing he remarked, "I wanted to be here. I wanted to be in Cleveland." On May 13, 2015, Kluber struck out a career-high 18 batters over eight shutout innings against the St. Louis Cardinals, earning his first win of the 2015 season. Kluber tied Bob Feller's 77-year franchise record for strikeouts in one game, Feller having done so on October 2, 1938. Despite posting a 3.49 ERA and striking out 245 batters in 222 innings, Kluber suffered from poor run support for much of the 2015 season, finishing with only nine wins and an American League-leading 16 losses.

==== 2016 season ====
Kluber was named a member of the 2016 American League All-Star team on July 7, 2016, his first selection, as a replacement for an injured Marco Estrada. Kluber was the winning pitcher in the All-Star Game. He finished the 2016 regular season with an 18–9 record, 3.14 ERA, an AL-leading 149 ERA+, and 227 strikeouts in 215 innings.

Kluber won his first two starts of the 2016 postseason, defeating the Boston Red Sox in Game 2 of the American League Division Series (ALDS) and the Toronto Blue Jays in Game 1 of the American League Championship Series (ALCS). In Game 1 of the World Series against the Chicago Cubs, Kluber struck out nine batters in six-plus shutout innings. He earned the win in both Games 1 and 4, and started Game 7. Though the Cubs won Game 7 and claimed the Series, Kluber's efforts help boost Cleveland's opportunities: he posted a 1.83 ERA in six postseason starts.

On November 7, Kluber was announced by the BBWAA as a finalist for the 2016 American League Cy Young Award, along with Justin Verlander and Rick Porcello. With 98 points, Kluber finished third in the voting that was announced on November 16, behind Porcello (137) and Verlander (132). He was, however, selected as the AL Sporting News Starting Pitcher of the Year.

==== 2017 season: 2nd Cy Young Award ====
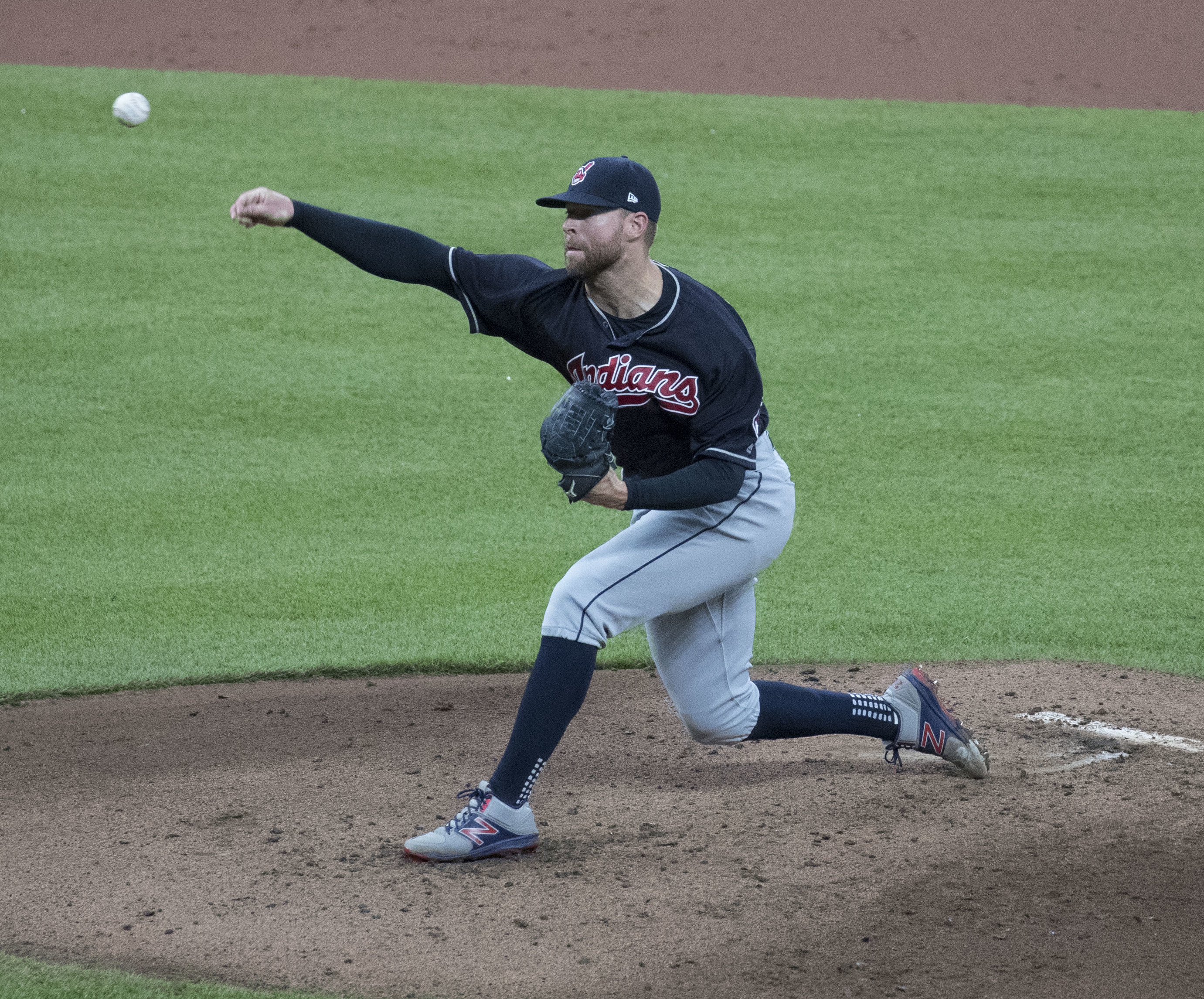
Kluber pitching for the Cleveland Indians in 2017

On May 3, 2017, after six subpar starts, the Indians placed Kluber on the 10-day disabled list due to a lower back strain. He had posted a 3–2 record, 5.06 ERA, 41 strikeouts and 13 walks in 37 1/3 innings. Upon returning from injury, Kluber's performances improved significantly. On July 3, 2017, Kluber was named the AL Pitcher of the Month for June after he posted a 4–0 record, 43 IP, 1.26 ERA, 64 SO, 0.67 WHIP and 13.4 K/9 in six starts. He won the award for the third time in his career. He was selected to the American League team in the 2017 All-Star Game, but chose not to play. On August 3, 2017, Kluber struck out 11 batters and gave up three hits in a 5–1 complete game win against the New York Yankees, making him the fourth pitcher ever to get eight or more strikeouts in 12 consecutive starts. The preceding three were Nolan Ryan, Pedro Martínez and Randy Johnson. He won his second AL Pitcher of the Month Award of the season in August, totaling a 5–1 record and 1.96 ERA. The Indians went 19–9.

Kluber hurled his third shutout of the season with 12 strikeouts on September 12, 2017, versus the Detroit Tigers, giving the Indians their 20th consecutive win. That tied the 2002 Oakland Athletics for the American League record. Kluber scattered five hits while allowing no walks and struck out eight. He won another AL Player of the Week Award for September 17 after becoming the third Indians pitcher with multiple 250-strikeout seasons. In 22 starts from June 1 through the penultimate, his ERA was 1.62. Named the AL Pitcher of the Month for September, it was Kluber's such third award of the season. His record included a 5–0 W−L, 0.84 ERA, 50 strikeouts and 43 innings pitched. The Indians' record for the month was 25–4, and included the majority of a 22-game win streak that set the American League record, with Kluber helping Cleveland to three of those victories in September. The club won an AL-best 102 games.

In his most dominant season to date, Kluber concluded 2017 leading the major leagues or tying for the lead in each of ERA (2.25), wins (18), complete games (five), shutouts (three), WHIP (0.869), SO/BB (7.36), ERA+ (202), and WAR for pitchers (8.0). He also led the AL in H/9 (6.2) and BB/9 (1.6). His ERA was the lowest for an Indians pitcher to qualify for the ERA title since Gaylord Perry in 1972 (1.92).

Cleveland faced New York in the ALDS, and Kluber started two of the games. He allowed nine runs and four home runs in 6 2/3 innings as New York defeated Cleveland in five games. Speculation arose that he had reinjured his back, but Kluber denied such assertions.

End of season awards for Kluber included his second Cy Young Award and selection as a starting pitcher on Baseball America's All-MLB Team.

==== 2018 season: 20 game winner ====
Kluber was selected to his third All-Star Game in July (though he did not pitch in the game), and on September 24, Kluber pitched seven shutout innings as the Indians beat the Chicago White Sox 4–0, giving him his 20th win of the season – the first time in his career he had reached that milestone. He started Game 1 of the American League Division Series but was the losing pitcher after giving up three home runs in 4 2/3 innings against the Houston Astros.

==== 2019 season: Long injury layoff ====
On May 1, 2019, Kluber fractured his right arm after being hit by a line drive during a game against the Miami Marlins. He was placed on the team's injured list without a concrete timetable for his return. After pitching a simulated game on August 3, 2019, Kluber was cleared for minor league rehab assignment. On August 7, 2019, Kluber pitched for the Columbus Clippers in his first rehab start, conceding two runs in three innings. Continuing his recovery process, he pitched four innings for the Akron RubberDucks on August 13, 2019. However, abdominal tightness halted his third rehab start on August 18, 2019. Kluber had thrown 20 pitches in one inning for Columbus before exiting. Though Kluber did not play for the Indians again in 2019, the Indians announced on October 31, 2019, that they had exercised their $17.5 million club option on Kluber for the 2020 season.

=== Texas Rangers (2020) ===
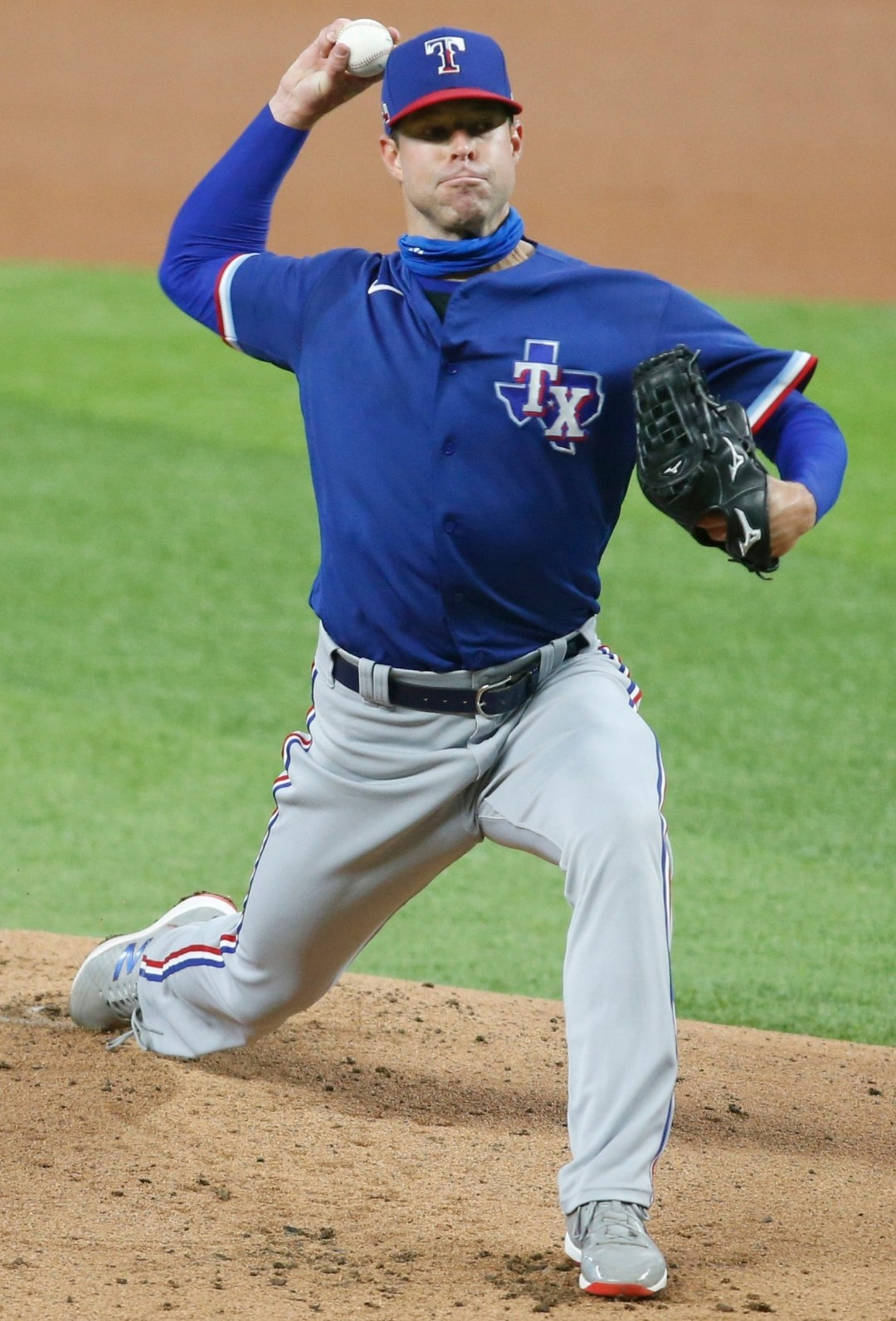
Kluber pitching in 2020.

On December 15, 2019, Cleveland traded Kluber and cash considerations to the Texas Rangers in exchange for Delino DeShields Jr. and Emmanuel Clase. On July 26, 2020, Kluber made his Rangers debut during the shortened 2020 season but lasted just 1 inning after experiencing shoulder tightness. He was subsequently diagnosed with a torn teres major muscle, sending him to the Rangers' injured list, thus ending his season.

=== New York Yankees (2021) ===
On January 27, 2021, Kluber signed a one-year, $11 million contract with the New York Yankees. He earned his first win for the Yankees on April 27, 2021, against the Baltimore Orioles. He earned his 100th career win on May 2, pitching eight scoreless innings against the Detroit Tigers.

Kluber after throwing a no-hitter with the Yankees in 2021

On May 19, 2021, Kluber pitched the 12th no-hitter in Yankees history against his team the previous season, the Texas Rangers. He threw 71 of 101 pitches for strikes and struck out nine batters in a 2–0 win, with a third-inning walk to Charlie Culberson being the only blemish in an otherwise perfect game. It was the Yankees' first no-hitter since David Cone's perfect game in 1999. Moreover, the no-hitter occurred one day after another no-hitter had been thrown by Spencer Turnbull of the Detroit Tigers, and was the sixth no-hitter overall of the 2021 MLB season. The homestanding Rangers gave out promotional bobbleheads of Kluber to fans before the game, as Kluber had pitched for them in 2020 when all their fan promotions were canceled because of the COVID-19 pandemic. On May 25, Kluber exited a game against the Toronto Blue Jays after experiencing a shoulder injury. An MRI revealed that he had suffered a strain to the subscapularis muscle of his right shoulder, and was expected to miss two months of the 2021 season. He was placed on the 60-day injured list on June 5. He made his return against Los Angeles Angels on August 30, 2021. In 16 games, Kluber was 5–3 with a 3.83 ERA and 82 strikeouts. Following the season, he became a free agent.

=== Tampa Bay Rays (2022) ===
On December 1, 2021, Kluber signed a one-year contract with the Tampa Bay Rays, with $8 million guaranteed salary and $5 million in achievable incentives.

During the 2022 season, he pitched to a 10–10 record with a 4.34 ERA, and his 3.0% walk percentage was the lowest in MLB among qualified pitchers.

=== Boston Red Sox (2023) ===
On January 12, 2023, Kluber signed a one-year contract with the Boston Red Sox with a club option for 2024. The deal was reportedly worth $10 million and the option $11 million. Kluber was Boston's Opening Day starting pitcher for 2023. In nine starts to begin the season, Kluber posted an unsightly 6.26 ERA with a 1.89 strikeout-to-walk ratio. On May 24, the Red Sox moved Kluber out of the starting rotation and into his first bullpen assignment since 2013. He was placed on the paternity list on May 30, and activated on June 2. Kluber's shaky performances continued as a relief pitcher, but on June 20 he recorded his first career save, albeit while allowing five hits, three home runs, and four earned runs in three innings pitched, closing out a 10–4 Red Sox win over the Minnesota Twins. The following day, he was placed on the injured list with right shoulder inflammation. On August 25, Kluber was transferred to the 60-day injured list. On September 16, Kluber was scratched from a rehab start and ruled out for the remainder of the season.

He became a free agent following the season and announced his retirement on February 9, 2024.

== Awards and achievements ==
Awards received
Name of award	Times	Dates	Ref
American League Pitcher of the Month	5	September 2014, August 2016, June, August and September 2017	
American League Player of the Week	4	June 16, 2013; September 21, 2014; June 25 and September 17, 2017	
Atlantic Sun Conference Pitcher of the Year	1	2007	
Bob Feller Man of the Year	2	2014, 2017	
Cy Young Award	2	2014, 2017	
Major League Baseball All-Star	3	2016, 2017, 2018	
The Sporting News American League Starting Pitcher of the Year	1	2016	
Lou Gehrig Memorial Award	1	2019	

American League statistical leader
Category	Times	Dates
Adjusted ERA+ leader	2	2016, 2017
Complete games leader	2	2015, 2017
ERA champion	1	2017
Games started leader	1	2014
Losses leader	1	2015
Shutouts leader	2	2016, 2017
Strikeout-to-walk ratio leader	1	2017
Walks plus hits per inning pitched leader	1	2017
Wins above replacement leader for pitchers	2	2014, 2017
Winning percentage leader	1	2017
Wins leader	2	2014, 2017
Notes: Through 2017 season. Per Baseball-Reference.com.

== Pitching style ==
Kluber threw five pitches: a four-seam fastball, a sinker with a two-seam fastball grip, a cutter, a breaking ball, and a changeup. His most dominant pitches were his two-seam sinker, which he first learned in 2011 as a member of the Columbus Clippers, and his breaking ball, which variously resembled a slider and a curveball.

Kluber was well known for his stoicism while on the mound. His listed height was 6 feet 4 inches (1.93 m).

== Personal life ==
Kluber and his wife, Amanda, have four children. They reside in Winchester, Massachusetts

In November 2014, Kluber was inducted into the Stetson Athletics Hall of Fame, and into the Atlantic Sun Conference Hall of Fame the following year.

On May 14, 2025, Kluber was hired by the Cleveland Guardians to serve as a special assistant of pitching.

== See also ==
- Cleveland Guardians award winners and league leaders
- List of Cleveland Guardians Opening Day starting pitchers
- List of Major League Baseball annual ERA leaders
- List of Major League Baseball annual shutout leaders
- List of Major League Baseball annual wins leaders
- List of Major League Baseball career WHIP leaders
- List of Major League Baseball no-hitters
- List of Major League Baseball single-game strikeout leaders
- List of New York Yankees no-hitters
- List of World Series starting pitchers
- List of people from Birmingham, Alabama

Achievements
Preceded by Spencer Turnbull	No-hitter pitcher May 19, 2021	Succeeded by Zach Davies, Ryan Tepera, Andrew Chafin, and Craig Kimbrel (combined)
