= Eclectica Magazine =

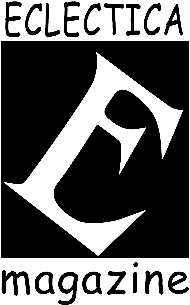
- Editor: Tom Dooley
- Categories: Literary magazine
- Frequency: Quarterly
- Format: Online
- Founded: 1996
- First issue: October 1996
- Country: United States
- Language: English
- Website: www.eclectica.org

Eclectica Magazine is one of the oldest surviving online literary publications.

== History and profile ==
Founded in 1996 by Chris Lott and Tom Dooley, Eclectica's extensive and growing archives contain poetry, fiction, non-fiction, miscellany, travel, opinion and reviews by hundreds of authors from around the world. The first issue appeared in October 1996. Dooley, the remaining founder/editor, published a "Best Fiction" anthology in 2003, which was recognized by the IPPY awards as a runner up in the short fiction category for that year. In 2004, Eclectica took top honors in storySouth's Million Writers Award.

Eclectica has published stories by nominees for the Pulitzer Prize (Teresa White), the Nebula Award (Mary Soon Lee), the Emmy Awards (Sean Gill) and the Pushcart Prize.

Current and past editors of Eclectica include David Ewald, Chris Lott, Julie King, Mitchel Metz, Kevin McGowin, Paul Sampson, Michael Spice, Elizabeth Glixman, John Reinhard, Jennifer Finstrom, Pamela Gemin, Colleen Mondor, and Evan Martin Richards. Regular contributors include Stanley Jenkins, C.E. Chaffin, Thomas Hubschman, Don Mager and Ann Skea.

Eclectica Magazine requires a processing fee for submitting content.

== See also ==
- List of literary magazines
