= Tom Dooley (editor) =

American journalist

Tom Dooley (born 1970) is an American journalist, who was the founder of Eclectica Magazine along with Chris Lott in 1996. Dooley was born on an island in the Aleutian Chain and attended high school in Tok, Alaska, graduating in 1988. He went to college in Green Bay, Wisconsin, and Chicago, Illinois, studying creative writing under Tom Churchill and Richard G. Stern.

For the next eleven years, he taught and coached a variety of subjects and grades in Alaska, Arizona, and Wisconsin before taking a degree in public administration and settling in Albuquerque, New Mexico. He lives there today and works for the government, continuing to edit Eclectica in his spare time.

Dooley is a strong proponent of online publishing which he says results in a unique style of writing being published online.

In 2003, Dooley edited the anthology Eclectica Magazine Best Fiction V1, which was a finalist for the Independent Publisher Book Award. In 2016, the Eclectica imprint released four new "best of" collections, Best Fiction V2, Best Nonfiction V1, Best Poetry V1, and Speculative Edition V1, as well as a collection of travel writing by William Reese Hamilton titled Tales of Choroní: Little Adventures in the Middle of Nowhere.

Dooley also contributes to Eclectica as an op-ed writer in the magazine's Salon section, has done the occasional music review, and once interviewed well-known conspiracy theorist Michael Ruppert. His review of Willis Alan Ramsey's self-titled debut album and his discussion of John D. MacDonald's Travis McGee character are popular links.

== Bibliography ==
- Eclectica Magazine Best Fiction V1 (Eclectica Press International, 2003) - Series and volume editor
- Eclectica Magazine Best Fiction V2 (Eclectica Publishing Intl LLC, 2016) - Series and volume editor
- Eclectica Magazine Best Nonfiction V1 (Eclectica Publishing Intl LLC, 2016) - Series editor
- Eclectica Magazine Best Poetry V1 (Eclectica Publishing Intl LLC, 2016) - Series editor
- Eclectica Magazine Speculative Edition V1 (Eclectica Publishing Intl LLC, 2016) - Series and volume editor
