= Edgar Peters Bowron =

American art historian

- Born: May 27, 1943 (age 83); Birmingham, Alabama, United States
- Occupations: Art historian Curator
- Spouse: Marcy Goodwin (m. 1988)
- Children: 3 (Clara, James, and John)
- Parent(s): James Edgar Bowron; Dorothe Peters Lowles

Academic background
- Education: Colgate University; New York University
- Thesis: The Paintings of Benedetto Luti, 1666-1724 (1979)
- Doctoral advisor: Donald Posner

Academic work
- Discipline: Art history
- Sub-discipline: Seventeenth- and eighteenth-century Italian art
- Institutions: Walters Art Museum; Nelson-Atkins Museum of Art; North Carolina Museum of Art; Harvard Art Museums; National Gallery of Art; Museum of Fine Arts, Houston

Edgar "Pete" Peters Bowron (born May 27, 1943 in Birmingham) is an American art historian and curator. Bowron served a director of both the North Carolina Museum of Art and the Harvard Art Museums. He is a scholar of seventeenth- and eighteenth-century Italian art, especially on the artist Pompeo Batoni.

== Career ==
A native of Birmingham, Bowron was born to James Edgar Bowron and Dorothe Peters Lowles. Bowron graduated from Colgate University with a Bachelor of Arts in English Literature in 1965, and then attended the New York University Institute of Fine Arts. There, he received both a Master of Arts and a Doctor of Philosophy in Art History in 1969 and 1979, respectively. Bowron wrote his doctoral dissertation was on the paintings of the artist Benedetto Luti, under the supervision of Donald Posner.

Bowron entered the museum field while a student as an administrator in the Department of Drawings at the Metropolitan Museum of Art from 1969 to 1970 and as a registrar at the Minneapolis Institute of Art from 1970 to 1973. In that same year, Bowron was hired to his first curatorial post as Curator of Renaissance and Baroque Art at the Walters Art Museum, where he served until 1978. Bowron then moved to the Nelson-Atkins Museum of Art, where he held the same title, for three years. In 1981, Bowron gained his first directorship at the North Carolina Museum of Art. Four years later, he was named Elizabeth and John Moors Cabot Director of the Harvard Art Museums, becoming the seventh director in its history and succeeded Seymour Slive. Bowron stepped down in 1990. A year later, he returned to curatorship as Andrew W. Mellon Senior Consultative Curator at the National Gallery of Art. However, Bowron was soon named Senior Curator of Paintings, becoming one of the first personnel decisions by director Earl A. Powell III, until 1996. He then left that position to become Audrey Jones Beck Curator of European Art at Museum of Fine Arts, Houston until retirement in 2014.

Bowron has served as a member of the Association of Art Museum Directors and the National Education Association. The National Gallery of Art holds an archive of Bowron's research.

== Personal life ==
On September 11, 1988, Bowron married Marcy Goodwin, with whom he had three children: Clara, James, and John. A previous marriage ended in divorce for Bowron.

== See also ==
- List of Colgate University people
- List of New York University alumni
- List of people from Birmingham, Alabama

Preceded by Seymour Slive	Elizabeth and John Moors Cabot Director; Harvard Art Museums; 1985 – 1990	Succeeded by James Cuno
