= Standard Deluxe =

Coordinates: 32°44′7″N 85°34′25″W

- Standard Deluxe logo

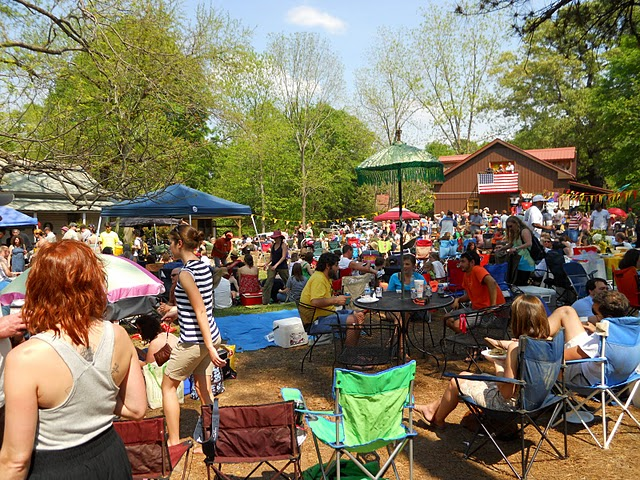
- The Old 280 Boogie; April 17, 2010
- Industry: Graphic design
- Founded: 1 January 2005
- Founders: Scott Peek; Ed Siegfried; Greg Siegfried
- Headquarters: Waverly, Alabama
- Number of locations: 1
- Products: Screen-printed t-shirts Posters
- Brands: Waverly Boogie
- Owners: Scott Peek
- Number of employees: 3
- Website: standarddeluxe.com

Standard Deluxe Inc. is a design and silkscreen print shop located in Waverly, Alabama, United States. Standard Deluxe sponsors a live music festival each Spring and Fall called the Waverly "Old 280" Boogie, among many other events throughout the year.

== Overview ==
Standard Deluxe is a design studio, silkscreen print shop and gallery/retail store based in the small town of Waverly, Alabama (population 145) in East Alabama. Scott Peek is the Owner/ President.

Peek began using the silkscreen while still in high school. He worked at print shops throughout junior college, and then at Auburn University, where he graduated in 1987 with a degree in visual design.

The company specializes in screen-printed T-shirts and posters and creates promotional materials for bands and music and cultural events, including the annual Waverly Boogies. Standard Deluxe also creates hand-printed wedding invitations, handbills, display signage and archival serigraph art prints.

=== Waverly Boogie ===
Each year Standard Deluxe hosts a spring music festival "The 280 Boogie," which has been held for 15 years Recently the venue added a fall festival as well – Waverly Fall Boogie. The festival has hosted original artists that range from Jason Isbell to The Civil Wars. The event is family-friendly and includes music and regional art vendors and Food Vendors.

==== History ====
In 2000, the Alabama Department of Transportation rerouted U.S. Highway 280 south of the town of Waverly instead of routing the highway through town. If the State of Alabama had gone ahead with its original plan, the town of Waverly would have ceased to exist.

To celebrate saving the town, residents in 2001 decided to hold an annual "Waverly Boogie" (or "Old 280 Boogie"), a multi-cultural festival typically held on the third Saturday in April to exhibit a wide variety of musicians and visual artists. The event is held on the grounds of Standard Deluxe Studios.

- The 2012 Waverly Boogie featured sets from Centro-Matic, Hurray for the Riff Raff and The Pine Hill Haints among others
- The 2013 Waverly Boogie was held on April 20, 2013, and featured headliner Charles Bradley & His Extraordinaires among others
- The 2014 event was held on April 19, 2014, and featured Junior Brown, Lydia Loveless, The Pine Hill Haints, Rayland Baxter, Have Gun, Will Travel, Shivering Timbers, and Belle Adair; a Fall Boogie was held September 13, 2014

Additionally, in 2014, Standard Deluxe hosted its first annual Heart of Waverly Bluegrass Festival. Performers included Larry Keel & Natural Bridge, Packway Handle Band, Dread Clampitt, Dead Winter Carpenters, Dooley's Blue Revue and Blackbird Pickers.
