= James Cuno =

American art historian and curator

- Born: James Bash Cuno; April 6, 1951 (age 75); St. Louis, Missouri, U.S.
- Occupations: Art historian Curator
- Spouse: Sarah Stewart
- Children: 2

Academic background
- Education: Willamette University (BA); University of Oregon (MA); Harvard University (MA)
- Thesis: Charles Philipon and La Maison Aubert: The Business, Politics, and Public of Caricature in Paris, 1820-1840 (1985)

Academic work
- Discipline: Art history

James Bash Cuno (born April 6, 1951) is an American art historian and curator. From 2011 to 2022, Cuno served as president and chief executive officer of the J. Paul Getty Trust.

== Career ==
A native of St. Louis, Cuno received a Bachelor of Arts in history from Willamette University in 1973. He then earned two Master of Arts degrees in art history from the University of Oregon and Harvard University, in 1978 and 1980 respectively. In 1977, Cuno married his Willamette classmate, Sarah Stewart. He continued on at Harvard to receive a Doctor of Philosophy in art history in 1985, and his doctoral dissertation was on the artist Charles Philipon.

While working on the doctorate, Cuno worked as assistant curator of prints at the Harvard Art Museums from 1980 to 1983. In that final year, he was hired as assistant professor of art history at Vassar College, a position that he held until 1986.

Cuno began a career in museum directorship, serving as the director of a number of institutions within the United States and abroad. He first served as director of the Grunwald Center for Graphic Arts at the Hammer Museum from 1986 to 1989, and the Hood Museum of Art until 1991. Cuno was then appointed Elizabeth and John Moors Cabot Director of the Harvard Art Museums from 1991 to 2002, replacing Edgar Peters Bowron, and then moved on to the Courtauld Institute of Art for a year from 2003 to 2004, succeeding Eric Fernie. While at Harvard, he was elected to the American Academy of Arts and Sciences in 2001. He left the Courtauld to head the Art Institute of Chicago as Eloise W. Martin Director until 2011, replacing James N. Wood. In that final year, Cuno became the president and chief executive officer of the J. Paul Getty Trust, and retired as of July 31, 2022.

During his career, Cuno has also served as director of the Association of Art Museum Directors.

== Works ==
- 1989: French Caricature and the French Revolution, 1789-1799. ISBN 0943739055
- 2006: Whose Muse?: Art Museums and the Public Trust. ISBN 0691127816
- 2007: The Silk Road and Beyond: Travel, Trade, and Transformation. ISBN 0300124287
- 2008: Who Owns Antiquity?: Museums and the Battle over Our Ancient Heritage. ISBN 0691137129
- 2009: The Modern Wing: Renzo Piano and the Art Institute of Chicago. ISBN 0300141122
- 2009: Master Paintings in the Art Institute of Chicago. ISBN 0300151039
- 2012: Whose Culture?: The Promise of Museums and the Debate over Antiquities. ISBN 0691154430
- 2012: Museums Matter: In Praise of the Encyclopedic Museum. ISBN 0226126773
