= Douglas Arant =

American attorney (1897–1987)

- Born: William Douglas Arant; May 19, 1897; Waverly, Alabama, U.S.
- Died: October 1987 (aged 90)
- Education: University of Virginia (BS, MS); Officers Candidate Training School; Yale University
- Occupation: Attorney
- Political party: Democratic
- Spouse: Letitia Tyler McNeel (m. 1929)
- Children: 3
- Parent(s): William Jackson Arant; Emma Baker Arant

William Douglas Arant (May 19, 1897 – October 1987) was a Birmingham, Alabama attorney.

== Early life ==
He was born on a small farm in Waverly, Lee County, Alabama. He was the son of William Jackson and Emma Baker Arant. The Arants were French Huguenots who originally settled in Orangeburg County, South Carolina. The Alabama Arants settled in central Alabama early in the 19th century.

He finished High School in three years (1914) and then received a scholarship, given by General and Mrs. R. D. Johnston, enabling him to enroll at the University of Virginia. While at UVA, he was a member of the Beta Theta Pi fraternity. In May 1918 his studies were interrupted by the war. He went to Atlanta to enlist as a Navy flier, but his eyesight was poor, and he joined the army. He was sent to Ft. Oglethorpe where he was enrolled in a regular army cavalry unit, then sent to a ranch in Texas and to Camp Clark, where he, as the only one in his battery who could read and write, was made Clerk. He had attended Officers Candidate Training School at Camp Taylor, Kentucky, and was commissioned second lieutenant in 1919.

== Legal career ==
In 1920 he received both Bachelor of Science and Master of Science degrees from the University of Virginia, where he was elected to Phi Beta Kappa. In 1923 he received his law degree, magna cum laude at Yale University, where he was editor-in-chief of the Yale Law Journal, and was instructor of political science during the summer terms. He was admitted to the Alabama Bar in 1923 and in 1927 he joined the firm of Tilman, Bradley and Baldwin, now Bradley Arant Boult Cummings.

Between 1933 and 1945, Arant served as either counsel to, or a member of, a number of agencies. He became special assistant to the United States Attorney General and chief counsel for the Petroleum Administration Board, National Recovery Administration, Washington, D.C., in 1933. The next year he served as chairman of the Regional Labor Board, Sixth District, National Recovery Administration, and in 1942 was the public member for the Fourth Regional Labor Board in Atlanta. Arant was also a member of the Board of Appeals, District Two, Alabama Selective Service System from 1940 to 1945.

Although a Democrat and a strong Roosevelt supporter, at the urging of Grenville Clark, Arant accepted the position of Chairman of the National Committee for Independent Courts in 1937. The committee was composed exclusively of Democrats who were steadfast supporters of President Roosevelt and the New Deal, but opposed to Roosevelt's legislative efforts to pack the existing nine member United States Supreme Court with additional justices of his own political philosophy.

In 1953, at the request of the United States Attorney General, Mr. Arant agreed to serve as a member of the National Committee To Study Antitrust Laws. The Committee issued its report on interpretation and application of the antitrust statutes (with recommendations for changes) in 1955.

His professional interest included memberships in the American Bar Association, and its Committee on Bill of Rights of which he was chairman the term 1941–1943; Alabama State Bar Association of which he was president in 1936 and a member of the Board of commissioners from 1931 to 1940; he was also a member of the Birmingham Bar Association, the American Law Institute, and a member of the Bar Association, City of New York. He was elected to membership in Beta Theta Pi, Phi Delta Phi and the Order of the Coif.

During his tenure as president of the Alabama State Bar, Arant urged the formation of a Junior Bar Association as a means of bringing together younger lawyers from all over the state to focus on professional issues of significant interest to them. The Alabama State Junior Bar, now the Young Lawyers Section of the Alabama State Bar, became a reality in 1937. Arant regularly attended meetings of the Junior Bar and came to know many of the young lawyers throughout the state. He helped organize of the Legal Aid Society of Birmingham, which he served as president. He was also an active, longtime member of St. Mary's on the Highlands Episcopal Church and the Democratic Party.

In the early 1950s, he sponsored the first African-American attorney for membership in the Birmingham Bar Association – Oscar W. Adams Jr., who later became a justice of the Alabama Supreme Court.

== Personal life ==
He married Letitia Tyler McNeel on December 31, 1929, and they had three daughters and a number of grandchildren.

== Honors ==
He was appointed to the US Postal Commission by Richard Nixon.

In 2005, Arant was inducted into the Alabama Lawyers' Hall of Fame.
