= Cynthia Bathurst =

American animal welfare advocate

- Born: Albion, Michigan
- Education: University of Alabama; University of Iowa
- Occupations: Community advocacy, animal well-being, CEO of Safe Humane
- Known for: Animal rights advocacy; Safe Humane Chicago's Court Case Dog program

Cynthia Bathurst (born in Albion, Michigan) is an American animal welfare advocate and the co-founder and chief executive officer of Safe Humane Chicago, a Chicago nonprofit known for its Court Case Dog Program. She received the American Veterinary Medical Association's Humane Award in 2009.

== Education ==
Bathurst is a 1974 graduate, with a bachelor's degree in mathematics, of the University of Alabama. While at Alabama, she was one of two students who in 1973 were given the Algernon Sydney Sullivan Award for "their excellence of character and service to humanity." In 1979 she received her doctorate degree in English from the University of Iowa.

== Animal advocacy ==
Bathurst worked in mathematics research and analysis for 25 years while volunteering in neighborhood groups and animal welfare until 2007 when she founded Safe Humane Chicago, a community-wide coalition of government agencies, community organizations, animal welfare groups that initially operated under the Dog Advisory Work Group, or D.A.W.G., a neighborhood committee and court advocacy program, also founded by Bathurst, to help curb violence against animals by focusing on the principle that a safe community is a humane one.

In 2008, she was named national director of the animal welfare group Best Friends Animal Society's Project Safe Humane program.

The Chicago Tribune, in a profile of Bathurst, wrote, "Over a quarter-century, she has built relationships with law enforcement and child and animal welfare officials, government and church leaders, and people in the business world, and she draws on that pool of expertise when there's a problem to be solved." The Tribune also reported that more than 60 groups have lined up behind Bathurst to get an anti-violence message out to citizens in high-crime areas. She testified at Chicago's City Hall during a November 2009 licensing committee session considering a dog-limit ordinance, which was voted down that day.

Tails Magazine described her as, "A legendary local community organizer (who) envisions a safer world for people through compassion for animals." And a USA Today article quoted community leaders, including Bathurst, about their fight against dogfighting.

In 2009, Bathurst was given the American Veterinary Medical Association's Humane Award for her efforts in preventing animal abuse. She was also featured by the Alabama Press-Register in an article about her continuing fight against animal violence.

In early 2010, the Court Case Dog Program, spearheaded by Bathurst, Safe Humane Chicago and with support from Best Friends and Chicago Animal Care and Control, was launched. Working with local judges, the program educates youth and rescues, trains and finds homes for dogs confiscated from owners in criminal court cases.

Bathurst is also an advisor on the National Canine Research Council, was a member of Chicago's Commission on Animal Care and Control for twenty years, and served as an officer or active member of the Chicago Animal Shelter Alliance and Chicagoloand Humane Coalition. In addition, she co-chaired the Task Force on Companion Animal Welfare and Public Safety for the Chicago City Council and was a member of the Chicago City Clerk's Dog Owner Task Force, as well as vice-chair of the Cook County Partners Against Animal Cruelty Advisory Board.

When Chicago White Sox pitcher Mark Buehrle supported a stray dog, Bathurst, through her affiliation with Best Friends, screened foster homes for the dog. She was quoted in a February 2011 article on Major League Baseball's news site, MLB.com, in support of Buehrle and his wife's efforts to help people and their pets.

In January 2012, Forbes' Web site featured Safe Humane Chicago's Court Case Dog program on its Crime, She Writes blog about the number of dogs who have gone through the program since it began.

Bathurst co-authored, with four others, an instructional manual to help law-enforcement officers deal humanely with dogs in their communities. The guide, titled The Problem of Dog-Related Incidents and Encounters, was published in 2011 by the U.S. Department of Justice's Community Oriented Policing Services. She was Substance Editor for a series of informational/training videos for the US Department of Justice COPS Office, Police & Dog Encounters: Tactical Strategies and Effective Tools to Keep Our Communities Safe and Humane: https://cops.igpa.uillinois.edu/resources/police-dog-encounters

== Speaking and testimony ==
Bathurst has spoken on animal cruelty and community safety at events including the University of Illinois Humane Education Seminar in 2010 and a 2011 University of Kansas School of Law symposium on prosecuting animal cruelty. On July 13, 2011, she testified at a Federal Communications Commission public hearing on the proposed merger of Comcast and NBC Universal, speaking about community television coverage of Safe Humane Chicago's work.
