= Safe Humane Chicago =

US nonprofit organization

- Founded: 2008
- Founder: Cynthia Bathurst
- Type: 501(c)(3)
- Purpose: Animal protection, animal rights
- Location: Chicago, Illinois
- Key people: Cynthia Bathurst, Director
- Website: safehumanechicago.org

Safe Humane Chicago is a nonprofit animal advocacy organization founded in 2008 by animal rights advocate Cynthia Bathurst. The nonprofit works to educate youth on animal safety and seeks justice for dogs that have been confiscated by law enforcement by placing them in foster care to later be adopted into new homes.

== History ==
Prior to Safe Humane Chicago, dogs were taken in as evidence against their owners for suspected dog fighting. These dogs would be labeled as Court Case Dogs, and after they were used as evidence, they would be euthanized.

Through the founding of Safe Humane Chicago, organized groups of volunteers rallied together to lobby against the unjust treatment of dogs that were being euthanized without given a chance for rehabilitation or adoption. In 2010, city officials allowed Safe Humane Chicago to take Court Case Dogs through their training program to rehabilitate the animals and give them a loving home. Since then, Safe Humane Chicago has rehabilitated Court Case Dogs into comfort animals for veterans, created training programs to engage at-risk youth with animals, and has adopted out hundreds of dogs into new families.

In addition, Safe Humane Chicago has advocated for dogs when encountering local law enforcement. Footage of local law enforcement using unnecessary deadly force against loose or stray dogs pushed Safe Humane Chicago to strengthen their education outreach about how to interact with dogs. Bathurst reached out to the Chicago Tribune to encourage law enforcement to use other means of handling a loose or stray dog, rather than resorting to shooting.

== Partnership ==
Safe Humane Chicago works with different programs and people within the city to achieve their mission to create a safe environment for humans and animals alike. They have partnered with a Chicago-based photographer, Josh Feeney, to create a book that features photographs of dogs to capture their different personalities and used the sales to directly support Safe Humane Chicago initiatives.

In addition, Safe Humane Chicago has partnered with Animal Care and Control as well as Best Friends Animal Society to fund staff, and launch their programs to rehabilitate and find new homes for animals.

Safe Humane Chicago has a pilot partnership with the K.L.E.O. Community Life Center, which supports women and children who have been abused. The partnership uses dogs from Safe Humane Chicago to teach children in the program how care for and socialize homeless dogs.

== Court Case Dog Program ==
The Court Case Dog Program was founded through Safe Humane Chicago in January 2010. The program's goal was to establish dog-friendly approaches to canines confiscated by law enforcement. In 2012, an estimated 142 canines were rescued and benefited from the Court Case Dog Program.

In the past, dogs were used as evidence against their owners, and often languished in the Chicago shelter until the cases were resolved. Upon resolution, the dogs were often euthanized. Due to this, the Court Case Dog Program allowed for the dogs to be placed in foster homes, training classes were provided to abused dogs. The goal was to rehabilitate court case dogs, allowing them to be placed up for adoption.

In August 2010, Chicago White Sox pitcher Mark Buehrle and his wife, Jamie, did a public service announcement to support the program. Later, in December 2010, the Berthoud Recorder covered two dogs who were rescued from euthanization through the program and placed with a trainer for rehab. A grassroots effort modeled after Chicago's program was started with Milwaukee's court case dogs.

On the program's first anniversary, in 2011, the Chicago Sun-Times wrote about two abused dogs whose owner was charged with abuse and neglect. Through the contributions made by Safe Humane Chicago the dogs were rehabilitated and adopted through their program. As of November 2015, the program has rescued a total of 760 dogs.

In the summer of 2013 eight dogs were rescued and brought to Safe Humane Chicago’s court case program after a fire in a house containing a total of 22 dogs. The dogs were made ready for adoption, including one dog, Clause, who was adopted by pianist, Ira Goodkin. Goodkin became inspired by the story, which led him to present a piano concert with proceeds donated to Safe Humane Chicago.

== Community Outreach Program ==
Safe Humane Chicago's youth program teaches high school students about animal safety, and the students later teach what they have learned to elementary school students. The goal of the program is to foster love between students and animals, and to teach them how to properly care and interact with different animals.

Safe Humane Chicago has held multiple events where they look to raise money for their organization, create awareness about their organization, and help people to gain a better understanding for at-risk animals. In an event in 2014, the department store Bloomingdale’s in Chicago on Michigan Avenue held a fashion runway event titled “Doggies and Denim”, which donated 10% of pre-tax sales to Safe Humane Chicago. It featured dogs from Safe Humane Chicago along with board members and community leaders as models.This event followed a similar event named "Cashmere and Canines", which raised around $2000 in funds for Safe Humane Chicago the year prior.

In July 2017 Safe Humane Chicago held a one-day volunteer event where volunteers were able to meet and spend time with cats and dogs at an animal care and control based in Chicago. Volunteers were first given an introduction to the organization and were then able to spend time with the animals, encouraged to bathe the animals and socialize as well. The event concluded with a debriefing where volunteers were free to ask any questions in order to learn about the organization and animals involved.

== Lifetime Bonds Flagship Program ==
One of Safe Humane Chicago's multiple flagship programs, Lifetime Bonds looks to match dogs and teenagers who are both considered to be at risk. Staff at Safe Humane Chicago, who are involved in the program, teach teens how to interact, train, and care for dogs using positive reinforcement. The program also assists with getting the dogs adopted that have come from Safe Humane Chicago's Court Case Dog program. In the end, the goal of the program is to allow both the dogs and their partners to help one another, teaching teens skills while helping to create adoptable dogs.

== Veterans Advancing Lives of Rescues ==
In 2014, Safe Humane Chicago launched the program Veterans Assisting the Lives of Rescues, VALOR, which consists of an eight-week pilot training to teach veterans how to train dogs to be more sociable and adoptable. Through VALOR, veterans are able to practice coping and social skills while training Court Case Dogs to be friendlier and better candidates for adoption.

The Canine Therapy Corps credits Safe Humane Chicago with helping veterans bond with a particular Court Case Dog, Swindle. Swindle came from a traumatic background, which led him to develop a form of post-traumatic stress disorder (PTSD). While working with the veterans at Jesse Brown VA Medical Center, his story created a bonding moment for the veterans who also struggle with PTSD.
