= Albert Pacifico =

American cardiac surgeon

Albert D. Pacifico is an American cardiac surgeon. Born in Brooklyn New York, he spent his entire career at the University of Alabama at Birmingham, arriving as a resident in 1967, and retiring in 2006. During his career he was known as a skillful surgeon who performed a very high volume (more than 30,000) of pediatric and adult cardiovascular surgeries.

Overall, he has been a joint or principal author of 274 papers each of which have been cited over 100 times, according to Google Scholar

His most cited papers are:

- R S Ballal, N C Nanda, R Gatewood, B D'Arcy, T E Samdarshi, W L Holman, J K Kirklin, A D Pacifico, "Usefulness of transesophageal echocardiography in assessment of aortic dissection", Circulation r doi 10.1161/01.CIR.84.5.190 with 248 citations
- George Cassady, M.D., Dennis T. Crouse, M.D., John W. Kirklin, M.D., Martha J. Strange, M.D., Clinton H. Joiner, M.D., Ph.D., Guillermo Godoy, M.D., Gregory T. Odrezin, M.D., Gary R. Cutter, Ph.D., James K. Kirklin, M.D., Albert D. Pacifico, M.D., Monica V. Collins, M.S.N., William A. Lell, M.D., Celia Satterwhite, M.D., and Joseph B. Philips, III, M.D. "A randomized, controlled trial of very early prophylactic ligation of the ductus arteriosus in babies who weighed 1000 g or less at birth", N Engl J Med 1989; 320:1511-1516June 8, 1989DOI: 10.1056/NEJM198906083202302 with 268 citations.
