= Bradley Arant Boult Cummings =

Law firm based in Birmingham, Alabama, USA

Bradley Arant Boult Cummings LLP
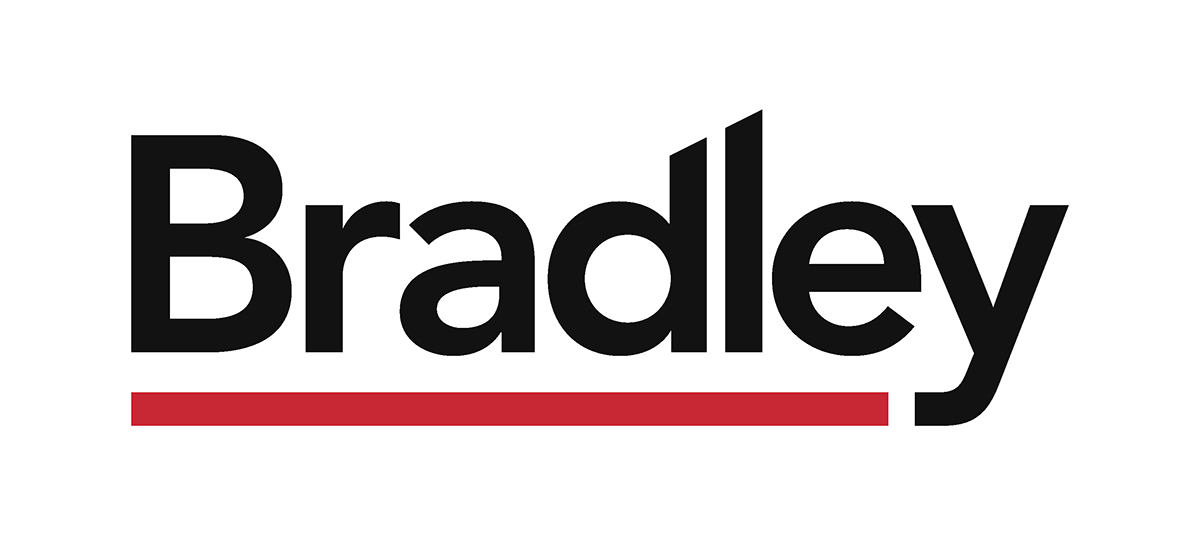
- Headquarters: Birmingham, Alabama; United States
- No. of offices: 13 (2026)
- No. of attorneys: 750+ (2026)
- Major practice areas: General Practice
- Key people: Jonathan M. Skeeters, Chairman of the Board and Managing Partner
- Date founded: 1870; 156 years ago
- Company type: Limited liability partnership
- Website: www.bradley.com

Bradley Arant's logo prior to the merger with Boult Cummings

Bradley Arant Boult Cummings LLP is a law firm based in Birmingham, Alabama. In addition to its Birmingham office, Bradley also has offices in Charlotte, North Carolina; Houston, Texas; Dallas, Texas; Huntsville, Alabama; Jackson, Mississippi; Montgomery, Alabama; Tampa, Florida; Washington D.C.; Nashville, Tennessee; and Atlanta, Georgia.

== History ==
=== Bradley Arant Rose & White LLP ===
Bradley Arant Rose & White was founded in 1870 as Hewitt & Walker in Elyton, Alabama, and would later move to Birmingham, Alabama. At the time of the firm's merger with Boult Cummings it had over 250 attorneys at six offices. Noted attorney Douglas Arant joined the firm in 1923. His name was added to the firm name in 1945 and he remained with Bradley Arant Rose & White until his death in 1987.

=== Boult Cummings Conners & Berry, PLC ===
Boult Cummings's logo prior to the merger with Bradley Arant

Boult Cummings Conners & Berry was founded in 1910 in Nashville, Tennessee. At the time of the firm's merger with Bradley Arant it had 100 attorneys at its one office in Nashville.

== Merger ==
On December 8, 2008, Bradley announced its merger with Boult Cummings Conners & Berry, PLC, with the combined firm taking the name Bradley Arant Boult Cummings LLP. The merger became effective on January 1, 2009. The combined firm is listed as one of the National Law Journal's 250 largest American law firms in its NLJ 250. The firm's chairman of the board and managing partner is Jon Skeeters. The combined firm is known for major construction company work in Europe and Asia, for multinational pharmaceutical company work in New York and California, for major insurance and financial services work in Texas, Indiana, and Alabama and for working with national tire manufacturers in Tennessee and Georgia.

In 2026, Bradley entered the AmLaw 100 for the first time as the 100th largest law firm in the United States.

== Offices ==
The firm's largest offices by number of attorneys are Birmingham and Nashville. It maintains other U.S. offices in Atlanta, Charlotte, Chattanooga, Dallas, Houston, Huntsville, Jackson, Knoxville, Montgomery, Tampa, and Washington, D.C..

== Awards ==
In August 2020, Bradley Partner Jay Bender was awarded the Alabama Commendation Medal from the Alabama Army National Guard for his work on the "Honoring American Veterans in Need Act of 2019" (HAVEN Act).
