= Through the Sparks =

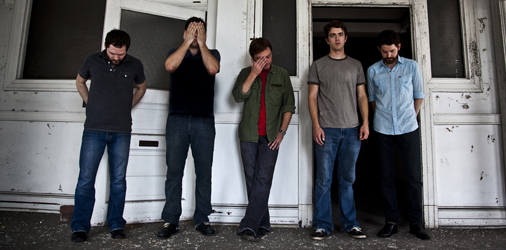
- Through the Sparks, 2011

Background information
- Origin: Birmingham, Alabama, US
- Genres: Rock, Psychedelic, alternative rock
- Years active: 2003–present
- Labels: Communicating Vessels
- Members: Jody Nelson - vocals, guitar, piano, organ James Brangle - piano, organ, guitar Greg Slamen - bass guitar, piano, guitar, organ Shawn Avery - drums, vocals Nikolaus Mimikakis - guitar, vocals
- Past members: Grey Watson; Thomas Mimikakis; Michael Shackelford Guest Horn Section: Chad Fisher - horn arrangements/trombone Gary Wheat - saxophone Omari Thomas - trumpet Guest Vocalists: Bo Butler - vocals Duquette Johnston - vocals Kate Taylor - vocals Janet Simpson - vocals Preston Lovinggood - vocals
- Website: communicatingvessels.com/through-the-sparks

Through The Sparks is an American psychedelic/folk rock band, formed in 2003, in Birmingham, Alabama. The band gained traction following the release of their first album, Lazarus Beach, in 2007. Their sound is often characterized by lush instrumentation and precise arrangements. The band utilizes both traditional instruments and a variety of electric pianos, guitars, organs, eccentric percussion, horns and synthesizers.

Until the March 2016 release of Transindifference (Communicating Vessels), Through the Sparks had remained on the independent label, Skybucket Records for their entire catalog which initiated with the EP, Coin Toss EP in 2005, followed by a limited edition collection of early demos called Audio Iotas: Scraps for the Human Ear later that year. The band's albums on Skybucket Records are Lazarus Beach released in 2007 and Worm Moon Waning released in 2010.

Almanac - MMX - Year of Beasts was released June 21, 2011. A year later Through The Sparks released the Alamalibu EP, named for their East Birmingham, Alabama recording studio, on June 19, 2012. Alamalibu EP featured the single and video "Angel Fix". A career spanning retrospective collection of live recordings, live-in-the-studio recordings, remixes and previously unreleased material titled Invisible Kids - was released digitally in January 2014.

On March 18, 2016, Through the Sparks released their third album, Transindifference.

In late 2016, Through the Sparks released a digitally distributed single titled Meteors in Gorges which was produced by Birmingham-based producer Daniel Farris at the Communicating Vessels recording studio and HQ. The single featured a large group of female backing vocalists who were prominent Birmingham musicians and artists.

In 2018, Through the Sparks released their entire catalog on their bandcamp site, which included previously unreleased (or out of print) recordings.

In 2022, Skybucket Records reissued Lazarus Beach for the first time on vinyl, with a package design by Roy Burns.

== Discography ==
=== Extended plays ===
Title	Label	Year
Coin Toss EP	Skybucket	2005
Alamalibu EP	Skybucket	2012

=== Collections ===
Title	Label	Year
Audio Iotas: Scraps For The Human Ear	Skybucket	2005
Almanac - (MMX) Year of Beasts [2010 Singles]	Skybucket	2011
Invisible Kids [Live + Studio Retrospective]	Skybucket	2014

=== Studio albums ===
Title	Label	Year
Lazarus Beach	Skybucket	2007
Worm Moon Waning	Skybucket	2010
Transindifference	Communicating Vessels	2016
Lazarus Beach (Anniversary Vinyl Re-issue)	Skybucket	2022

=== Appearances on Other Compilations ===
Album title	Song title	Label	Year
Low Dose Exposure	Demons Respond	Skybucket	2003
Put Your Hand Down	Man Alive and Gap in the Spark	Skybucket	2005
Chords of Relief (Katrina Benefit)	Picture	Skybucket	2005
The Cornerstone Player No. 72	Mexico (Every Last Buffalo)	Cornerstone Promotion	2007
Number 6	The Final If And When	Vice	2007
Paste Magazine Sampler No. 32	L. Roi	Paste Magazine	2007
Skybucket Spring / Summer Sampler 2011	Statue Scared	Skybucket	2011
