= Kevin McGowin =

American writer (1970–2005)

- Born: 1970; Birmingham, Alabama, U.S.
- Died: January 18, 2005 (aged 34–35); Birmingham, Alabama, U.S.
- Education: Auburn University at Montgomery; University of Florida
- Occupations: Writer; educator

Kevin McGowin (1970 in Birmingham, Alabama – January 18, 2005 in Birmingham) was an American writer, college teacher and typewriter enthusiast. Holding degrees in literature from Auburn University at Montgomery and the University of Florida, he taught literature and creative writing, moving from one college to another quite often, before he decided to become a full-time writer. He lived in Birmingham, Micanopy, Denver, Raleigh, New Hampshire, New York City, New Orleans, and then back in his native Birmingham, where he died in a tragic accident, choking on food.

He was first noticed as a poet, with such collections as Bogus Pastimes (1993), Wild Afflictions (1994), and The Better Part of a Fortnight (1999).

Initially his fiction was published online, notably the three novels known as "The Benny Poda Trilogy": The Benny Poda Years (2001), Town Full of Hoors (2001) and What God Has Joined Together (2002), all written and posted "a chapter a day". The trilogy is his only major work of fiction published in print. His last novel, Flies in the Buttermilk, was serialized online in 2003–2004. All these are social satires, with some elements of supernatural and macabre, spiced up with a considerable amount of strong language. McGowin showed a more lyrical side in his short stories, to be found on various websites online; Slender Accidents (2004) being a major collection of vignettes.

Kevin McGowin was a noted reviewer, contributing for years to Oyster Boy Review magazine and Eclectica Magazine, where he was appointed Reviews Editor in 2003.

He also recorded a CD of original folk songs entitled Love & Pity (A Priori, 2000).
