= Robert B. McNeill =

Robert Blakely McNeill
- Born: May 21, 1915; Birmingham; Alabama, U.S.
- Died: July 15, 1975 (aged 60)
- Education: Birmingham-Southern College; Union Presbyterian Seminary; University of Kentucky
- Spouse: Jeanne Lancaster (m. 1944)
- Children: 3
- Parent(s): Walter Patterson McNeill, Mary McLeod McNeill

Rev. Robert B. McNeill (May 21, 1915 - July 15, 1975) was a Presbyterian minister who was the pastor of several southern churches in the 1940s to the 1960s. After writing an article in Look magazine, he was dismissed from his position as pastor of First Presbyterian Church of Columbus, Georgia, due to his views on race and racial segregation. Though McNeill was not the only southern pastor to be removed due to his views on segregation, the incident garnered a great deal of media attention and negative press for the south and the commission which dismissed him, especially because McNeill was a southerner himself.

== Early life ==
Robert B. McNeill was born on May 21, 1915, in Birmingham, Alabama to Walter Patterson McNeill and Mary McLeod McNeill. His mother and father were both southerners and Scottish, and taught McNeill that he "was an exceedingly lucky person to be white, American, and Southern, but above all to be of Scotch descent." As a boy, like most southerners, he was raised by an African American "cook-nurse." Because his middle-class neighborhood, known as Enon Ridge, and later to be called "Dynamite Hill" due to bombings by the Ku Klux Klan, was next to the African American neighborhood called East Thomas, there was a persistent fear that African Americans would move into the neighborhood and drive the prices down. As a child, he internalized this adult fear, as many other children did, and would throw rocks at the African American boys who ventured into the neighborhood. However, he also looked up to an African American man named Bob Perdue who worked on the neighbor's yard, and was very attached to his cook-nurse, whom he had the duty of walking home from the age of 12. Whenever a cook quit, it was his job to discover prospects for a replacement, leading him to go from door to door in the African American ghetto of East Thomas, judging the women and their houses to decide if they were appropriate to invite to speak to his mother about the job, giving him a larger experience with African Americans than most of the boys he knew. Like many other Southerners at the time, as a child he enjoyed the company of particular African Americans, but did not feel the same about African Americans as a whole.

== Education ==
McNeill began school at the age of seven, and attended Graymont Grammar School for the first seven grades. Then, from 1928 to 1932, he attended Phillips High. He was never particularly scholarly, nor good at sports, and spent most of his school years in obscurity. Upon graduating high school, he attended Birmingham-Southern College, where he graduated during the middle of the Great Depression. While in the college, chapel was mandatory. One week, the message was preached by Methodist Rev. Henry Hitt Crane. Afterwards, McNeill spoke with Crane, who asked him if he had considered entering the ministry. While McNeill did not initially believe this was his purpose, he would remember the man's comment for the rest of his life. Instead, he entered the law school at the University of Alabama in Tuscaloosa in 1936. While working as a night short-order cook, he attempted to study law, but was largely unimpressed with the attitude of his fellow students and professors, especially the claim made by one professor: "It doesn't make a damn what's right, but what the law is."

In the summer of 1937, he worked for Linde Air Products, intending to return to law school after earning enough money. However, after the death of his father and considerable internal debate, he decided instead to attend Union Presbyterian Seminary in 1939 to become a Presbyterian minister. He had hoped to find seminary less hypocritical than law school; however, he would come to consider much of seminary life as hypocritical as his law professor had been. McNeill would become involved in a battle to end a system of table seating that acted similarly to sororities. Older students would choose which of the freshmen were worthy to join their "table," denying access to those who were less intelligent or socially awkward, and alumni would return to the table that they had been at when they were in the seminary. The first attempt to end the table seating system failed, and one man commented that "the outcome was the will of God," introducing McNeill to the concept that "the status quo equals the will of God." Though the attempt to end the system had failed the first year, it would pass the next. Furthermore, while he attended the school, he felt that "We were to preach on temperance but not prohibition, justice but not politics, greed but not economics, prejudice but not segregation, and so on." While in seminary, McNeill felt they were taught that it was not the job of a pastor to encourage social justice.

After his first year, he was made the student minister to a small church in Virginia. Though he had been assigned to preach and work at the church every other Sunday from fall of 1940 to the spring of 1942, he ended up losing the position by the end of the spring term of 1941. Though he admitted in his biography that he was not perfect, he felt that he had done an average job for a student. However, the position was controlled by two members, who paid the salary, and who had disapproved of him personally. The experience taught him that he "hated snobbery," and that his attempts to "be the conformist" had failed, and that he had "betrayed his integrity" by doing so.

McNeill felt that his "first formal experience in race relations" was an interseminary conference in 1940, where he was one of the delegates. The conference was integrated, and for the first time, he met African Americans his same age with the same education as him, and realized for the first time that they were on the same level as him. While he had begun reluctantly, he concluded that "It wasn't bad at all."

== Ministerial life ==
Upon graduating seminary in 1942, he was offered a part-time position at the University of Kentucky, where he would be minister for the Presbyterian students. While there, he would gain a master's degree in philosophy, and he would meet Jeanne Lancaster, whom he married in August 1944. While he was serving as minister to students, he would have a moderate position on race issues, believing that "occasional exposure to each other was good for both races", but never advocating any direct end to segregation.

In 1945, he became minister to students at the University of Texas for one year. His students invited a choir from a local African American college, and insisted upon the meeting being integrated. He supported the students' freedom to choose this option, but the session and elders opposed this, claiming that it would cause divisions. Because of a shortage of available housing, he soon left this position. While he had never taken any stance against segregation, he was beginning to feel he could no longer be a moderate, and began to realize "that racism was another one of those uniforms of snobbery that [he] detested."

In the summer of 1945, he became pastor of an actual church instead of simply being a minister at a university. The church was located in Fairfield Highlands, near to Birmingham, Alabama. While working at the church, McNeill began to study the issue of segregation, beginning with Gunnar Myrdal's An American Dilemma, and other books. He also went back to visit his old neighborhood, and spoke with an African American man, whose house had been bombed by the Ku Klux Klan, but who had rebuilt and steadfastly remained. These influences led him to feel ashamed of the South, and though he was not yet in favor of integration because of a fear of "the social convulsion" he knew would come, he could no longer ignore the issue.

After this, in 1947, he moved on to Jacksonville, Alabama, where he would pastor a church of only 120 members. While he was still not an advocate of integration, he did preach on Race Relations Sunday a sermon entitled "The Dark Blot on Democracy," which, for its time, was "provocative," according to McNeill's autobiography. An elder's wife commented to him that "I enjoyed that sermon—no, I didn't—I needed to hear it." In 1950, he was chairman of the Christian Relations Committee for the synod. The committee was not intended to speak on race; however, he chose to do so, and in his report to the synod claimed that "We are faced with two inevitables, the Federal Constitution and the Christian conscience. Both dictate that legal segregation shall not last forever." The report did not encourage integration; it simply asked that the church "Work toward all possible accomplishment under the separate-but equal doctrine now in effect." The report passed, 45 to 22; however, the opponents made sure to register their names against it, a demonstration of their fierce opposition.

In 1951, he was approached by a pastor-seeking committee from First Presbyterian Church of Columbus, Georgia. The church had 1,200 members, making it much larger than his current pastorate. McNeill accepted their call. For a time, life went smoothly at the church. In 1954, the southern branch of the Presbyterian Church, was considering rejoining the northern, and ending the split existing since the Civil War. His church attempted to influence him to vote against rejoining, but McNeill refused, choosing instead to vote for the church to be unified. The measure to rejoin the northern church failed, and some members of the congregation were displeased with McNeill for his unpopular vote.

In 1956, an African American doctor named Brewer, who had been the head of the local NAACP, was murdered. All the pastors condemned the murder; but McNeill stated that "I am primarily concerned with the thousands of us who created the spiritual climate that made this act possible and with those who approve it," which displeased some of the congregation. They were also displeased with his handling of the issue of Little Rock, where he refused to condemn the federal action in enforcing integration.

== Expulsion from First Presbyterian Church ==
=== Article in Look Magazine ===
In April 1957, Chester Morrison, an editor of Look magazine, asked McNeill to author an article denouncing the Ku Klux Klan. McNeill delayed, initially reluctant due to the possible reprisals such an article would create, but agreed to meet with Morrison. After discussing the issue with his wife, McNeill agreed to write an article, which he and Morrison decided would be on a southern minister's approach to the overall problem of segregation, instead of being directly against the Klan. Though the article itself was not "anti-southern," it was written for Look magazine, which some members felt was "a South-killer magazine." McNeill called the elders and deacons to a joint meeting, where he read the article. The article was mild, only encouraging "creative contact" and not even full integration. Even though it was mild, an opposition to McNeill had formed. They requested that the Presbytery come and "straighten out the affairs of our church." While the complaint made no mention of the Look article, the article was the true cause of the complaint. A judicial commission was sent. The commission made no charges, but advised McNeill that it would likely be best for him to accept a call to another church, as the church had become split. In the meantime, in November 1958, it dissolved the session, which had been hindering McNeill, and "admonished the members to protect the freedom of the pulpit."

However, the brief peace was soon broken. Steve Lesher, a reporter of the Columbus Ledger, wrote an article about McNeill, that was meant to be published in Look magazine. The article was to tell a positive story of how "a spokesman for racial justice [was] finally accepted by his community." However, Look magazine was still considered an "anti-southern" magazine to the congregation. To prevent controversy, McNeill published in the Sunday bulletin a statement asking the congregation to "Reserve your judgment until the article appears." Though the article itself never appeared in Look magazine, the word of it angered the antagonists, and convinced the commission that McNeill would no longer be able to be pastor of the church.

=== Expulsion ===
In June 1959, the chairman of the Judicial Commission informed McNeill that by a unanimous decision, McNeill would no longer be pastor of First Presbyterian Church of Columbus, Georgia. They stated in a speech on Sunday, June 7, while announcing their decision to the congregation that "The time has now come when, what has been the voice of the pulpit, should also become the voice of the people of the church as a witnessing whole. This leading through united church groups calls for a ministry where the emphasis is from a united church instead of from the pulpit alone…" As a consequence, the commission said that "the interest of religion" required McNeill to vacate the pulpit after the evening service. After this announcement, McNeill preached a farewell sermon. Time magazine would print this excerpt: "We in the South can no longer speak in terms of democracy or justice without making a parenthetical exception for an entire people. When we make this exception time after time in everything we do, we have lost the capacity to reason logically. I have grown to despise a particular word. That word is 'compromise.' Have you noticed how everybody is a moderate these days? Everybody is rushing toward the middle ground. We'll have to revise our terminology now. We'll have to refer to left moderates, right moderates and middle moderates. This type of so-called moderate will be caught up and squeezed in the very middle he has created for himself."

=== Media Reaction ===
This incident drew a great amount of media attention to McNeill, who "was bombarded with calls from all over the country," especially because when the Judicial Commission presented its report there were several newspaper reporters in the audience. The New York Times printed an article on June 9, entitled "Mr. McNeill's 'Crime'", denouncing the "racial bigotry" of removing McNeill from his post as pastor. The article suggested that by doing so, many in the South would be "disgust[ed]" and that the injustice of actions of the commission would "win his views more sympathetic attention." Time magazine also wrote of the incident on June 22, 1959. They described how the congregation had protested the chairman's decision, telling him that "You have been listening to the wrong people," and noting that "Some women in the choir burst into tears." Time magazine also noted that there were only 50 members of the 1,200 member church who were advocating for McNeill's dismissal. Jet magazine published a paragraph on the incident in its August 27, 1959 issue, stating that McNeill "was dismissed as pastor of the First Presbyterian Church in Columbus because of his views on racial integration." On July 12, The Miami News published a large article chronicling the story, and saying that "Nowhere has the South's tragic cleavage on the racial question produced a more shattering effect."

=== Heart Attack ===
The stress of the press's attention, as well as the stress that had been on McNeill from the challenge of running the church, caused him to have a heart attack while spending time with his children at a bowling alley, three days after he had been dismissed. He was kept in the hospital for twenty six days. Despite his dismissal, some of the women of the former church of his took turns sitting at a table in front of his hospital door, preventing any one from bothering him, so that he could successfully recover from his stressful ordeal. He received notes from all over the country, though he only received the chance to read them once he was out of the hospital. Even those who were opposed to his ideas still sent him "notes of sympathy," though there were also those who were of the belief "that the Lord finally had 'taken care of him.'"

=== Acceptance of Position at Bream Memorial Presbyterian Church ===
After he had recovered from his heart attack, McNeill decided to take up a position at Bream Memorial Presbyterian Church, located in Charleston, West Virginia. The church had contacted him before he was dismissed, asking him to replace their pastor, who had plans to retire. McNeill requested that they be sure that the congregation still wanted him, after the media storm. The church again replied that they would have him as a pastor, one of the elders making the comment "What kind of people do you think we are, that we would let you down now?" The decision was reported as unanimous, and in September 1959, he moved to Charleston. He began work on a part-time basis.

It soon became apparent that the senior pastor did not plan to retire, and resented McNeill as a threat to his job. Papers of the incident in Columbus were spread among the congregation, and a commission was called in once more. This time, the commission sided with McNeill, and the former pastor was dismissed. However, the stress caused McNeill to suffer from a heart attack again in February 1961, and he was hospitalized for six weeks. Afterwards, he returned to Bream Memorial Presbyterian Church and served as its pastor.

== Published work ==
McNeill wrote the book Prophet, Speak Now! which was published in 1961 by John Knox Press. In it he uses the models of Old Testament prophets such as Moses, Jeremiah, Isaiah, Amos, and Micah and Jesus Christ in the New Testament to encourage pastors to live out the prophetic role today.

McNeill also published an autobiographical book chronicling his experience entitled God Wills Us Free, which was published in 1965. He would be quoted by Jet magazine, stating that "Whites have been 'looting' Negroes for three centuries, so they set the stage for the explosion which has come," in response to the massive riots of 1967.
