= List of Alabama companies =

Location of Alabama

Alabama is a state in the Southeastern region of the United States. The state's primary industries are aerospace, education, health care, banking, and various heavy industries, including automobile manufacturing, mineral extraction, steel production and fabrication.

== Largest firms ==
This list shows firms in the Fortune 500, which ranks firms by total revenues reported before January 31, 2021. Only the top five firms (if available) are included as a sample.

Rank	Image	Name	Revenues (USD $M)	Employees	Notes
434		Regions Financial Corporation	6,655	19,406	Retail and commercial bank holding company headquartered in Birmingham. The Regions Bank subsidiary operates 1,454 offices in 16 states.
539		Vulcan Materials Company	4,857	8,847	Producer of construction materials, including crushed stone and gravel, operating in 20 states and Mexico.
554		Encompass Health	4,644	35,536	Healthcare services provider operating in 36 states and Puerto Rico, with divisional focus on inpatient rehabilitation, home health, and hospice.

== Notable firms ==
This list includes notable companies with primary headquarters located in the state. The industry and sector follow the Industry Classification Benchmark taxonomy. Organizations which have ceased operations are included and noted as defunct.

Notable companies Status: P=Private, S=State; A=Active, D=Defunct
Name	Industry	Sector	Headquarters	Founded	Notes	Status	
AAA Cooper	Industrials	Transportation services	Dothan	1955	Part of Knight-Swift	P	A
Adtran	Telecommunications	Telecommunications equipment	Huntsville	1985		P	A
AirMed International	Industrials	Transportation services	Birmingham	1987	Air ambulance service	P	A
Alabama Drydock and Shipbuilding Company	Industrials	Marine transportation	Mobile	1917	Shipyard, now part of BAE Systems	P	D
Alabama National BanCorporation	Financials	Banks	Birmingham	1986	Defunct 2008	P	D
Alabama Power	Utilities	Conventional electricity	Birmingham	1906		P	A
Alagasco	Utilities	Gas distribution	Birmingham	1852	Defunct 2017, now part of Spire Inc	P	D
American Cast Iron Pipe Company	Industrials	Industrial suppliers	Birmingham	1905	Pipes and waterworks	P	A
America's First Federal Credit Union	Financials	Banks	Birmingham	1936	Credit union	P	A
AmSouth Bancorporation	Financials	Banks	Birmingham	1970	Defunct 2006, merged into Regions Financial Corporation	P	D
Associated Grocers of the South	Consumer services	Food retailers & wholesalers	Birmingham	1927	Retailers' cooperative	P	A
Atlantic Marine	Industrials	Marine transportation	Jacksonville	1980	Defunct 2010, acquired by BAE Systems	P	D
Auburn Bank	Financials	Banks	Auburn	1907	Community bank	P	A
Austal USA	Industrials	Marine transportation	Blakeley Island	1999	Shipbuilder, part of Austal (Australia)	P	A
Avocent	Technology	Computer hardware	Huntsville	2000		P	A
Baron Services	Technology	Software	Huntsville	1990	Weather technology	P	A
BBVA USA	Financials	Banks	Birmingham	1964	Defunct 2021, now part of PNC Financial Services	P	D
BE&K	Industrials	Heavy construction	Birmingham	1972		P	D
Big B Drugs	Consumer staples	Drug retailers	Birmingham	1968	Defunct 1996, acquired by Revco	P	D
Birmingham Steel Corporation	Basic materials	Iron & steel	Birmingham	1983	Acquired by Nucor in 2002	P	D
B.L. Harbert International	Industrials	Heavy construction	Birmingham	2000	Construction company	P	A
Blue Cross and Blue Shield of Alabama	Health care	Health care providers	Birmingham	1936	Part of Blue Cross Blue Shield Association	P	A
Books-A-Million	Consumer services	Specialty retailers	Birmingham	1917	Booksellers	P	A
Brasfield & Gorrie	Industrials	Heavy construction	Birmingham	1921		P	A
Bromberg's	Consumer services	Specialty retailers	Birmingham	1836	Jewelry and gift retailers	P	A
Bruno's	Consumer services	Food retailers & wholesalers	Birmingham	1932	Defunct 2012	P	D
Bryant Bank	Financials	Banks	Tuscaloosa	2005	Community bank	P	A
Buffalo Rock	Consumer goods	Soft drinks	Birmingham	1901		P	A
Camber Corporation	Industrials	Defense	Huntsville	1990	Reorganized into Huntington Ingalls Industries in 2016	P	D
Chester's	Consumer services	Restaurants & bars	Birmingham	1965	Fried chicken fast food	P	A
CNHI	Consumer services	Publishing	Montgomery	1997	Newspaper holding	P	A
Colonial Bancgroup	Financials	Banks	Montgomery	1974	Bankrupt in 2009	P	D
Colonial Properties	Financials	Mortgage REITs	Birmingham	1970	Acquired by Mid-America Apartment Communities in 2013	P	D
Continental Aerospace Technologies	Industrials	Aerospace	Mobile	1929	Part of Aviation Industry Corporation of China	P	A
Corder Drum Company	Consumer Discretionary	Recreational products	Huntsville	1979	Defunct firm as of 1990, acquired by Sammy Darwin	P	D
Curtiss Motorcycles	Consumer discretionary	Recreational vehicles and boats	Birmingham	1991	Formerly Confederate Motors	P	A
Dallas Mill	Basic materials	Basic resources	Huntsville	1891	Textiles, demolished in 1991	P	D
deciBel Research	Industrials	Defense	Huntsville	2002	Radar, sensors	P	A
Delchamps	Consumer services	Food retailers & wholesalers	Mobile	1921	Supermarket chain, defunct 1997	P	D
Deltacom	Telecommunications	Fixed line telecommunications	Huntsville	1997	Acquired by EarthLink in 2010	P	D
Diagnostic Health Corporation	Health care	Health care providers	Birmingham	2007		P	A
Digium	Technology	Telecommunications equipment	Huntsville	1999	Telecom software and hardware	P	A
Dreamland Bar-B-Que	Consumer services	Restaurants & bars	Tuscaloosa	1958	Bar-b-que chain	P	A
Drummond Company	Basic materials	Coal	Birmingham	1935		P	A
Dynetics	Industrials	Aerospace and defense	Huntsville	1974	Subsidiary of Leidos	P	A
EBSCO Industries	Conglomerate	-	Birmingham	1944	Information services, manufacturing, publishing	P	A
Encompass Health	Health care	Health care providers	Birmingham	1984	Health care services chain	P	A
Energen	Oil & gas	Exploration & production	Birmingham	1979	Acquired by Diamondback Energy in 2018	P	D
Express Oil Change & Tire Engineers	Consumer services	Specialty retailers	Birmingham	1979	Automotive maintenance chain	P	A
Foosackly's	Consumer services	Restaurants & bars	Mobile	2000	Fast food chicken chain	P	A
Gayfers	Consumer services	Broadline retailers	Mobile	1879	Acquired by Dillard's in 1998	P	D
Golden Flake	Consumer goods	Food products	Birmingham	1923	Snack food brand, now part of Utz Brands	P	A
Gus Mayer	Consumer services	Broadline retailers	Birmingham	1900	Department store	P	A
Harbert Management Corporation	Financials	Investment services	Birmingham	1993		P	A
Hibbett Sports	Consumer services	Specialty retailers	Birmingham	1945	Sporting goods retailer	P	A
Hoar Construction	Industrials	Heavy construction	Birmingham	1940	Commercial construction	P	A
Hunt Refining Company	Oil & gas	Exploration & production	Tuscaloosa	1946	Refinery	P	A
Intergraph	Technology	Software	Huntsville	1969	Now part of Hexagon AB	P	D
Jack's	Consumer services	Restaurants & bars	Birmingham	1960	Fast food chain	P	A
Just For Feet	Consumer services	Specialty retailers	Birmingham	1977	Defunct 2004	P	D
McWane	Industrials	Industrial suppliers	Birmingham	1921	Pipes and waterworks	P	A
Medical Properties Trust	Financials	Mortgage REITs	Birmingham	2003	Health care real estate investment trust	P	A
Mercedes-Benz U.S. International	Consumer goods	Automobiles	Vance	1993	Part of Daimler AG	P	A
Milo's Hamburgers	Consumer services	Restaurants & bars	Birmingham	1946	Fast food chain	P	A
Motion Industries	Industrials	Industrial suppliers	Birmingham	1946	Industrial parts	P	A
O'Neal Industries	Basic materials	Iron & steel	Birmingham	1921	Metals service center company	P	A
O'Neal Steel	Basic materials	Iron & steel	Birmingham	1921		P	A
Press-Register	Consumer services	Publishing	Mobile	1813	Newspaper	P	D
ProAssurance	Financials	Insurance	Birmingham	1976	Medical liability insurance	P	A
Progress Rail	Industrials	Railroads	Albertville	1982	Railroad transit products	P	A
Protective Life	Financials	Life insurance	Birmingham	1907	Life and annuities	P	A
Raycom Media	Consumer services	Broadcasting & entertainment	Montgomery	1996	Acquired by Gray Television in 2019	P	D
Redstone Federal Credit Union	Financials	Banks	Huntsville	1951	Credit union	P	A
Regions Financial Corporation	Financials	Banks	Birmingham	1971	Large bank	P	A
Retirement Systems of Alabama	Financials	Investment services	Montgomery	1945	Pension management	P	A
Right Side Broadcasting Network	Media	Publishing	Auburn	2015	Online political content	P	A
Sequel Youth and Family Services	Health care	Health care facilities	Huntsville	1992	Operates in multiple US states	P	A
Shipt	Industrials	Delivery services	Birmingham	2014	Subsidiary of Target	P	A
Smith Custom Amplifiers	Consumer goods	Recreational products	Montgomery	2002	Manufacturer of guitar amplifiers	P	A
Sneaky Pete's	Consumer services	Restaurants & bars	Vestavia Hills	1966	Hot dog chain	P	A
Sonat	Oil & gas	Exploration & production	Birmingham	1928	Merged with El Paso Corp. in 1999	P	D
Southern Company Services	Industrials	Business support services	Birmingham	1963		P	A
Southern Family Markets	Consumer services	Food retailers & wholesalers	Birmingham	2005	Supermarkets, acquired by Belle Foods	P	D
Southern Natural Gas	Oil & gas	Pipelines	Birmingham	1928	Natural gas transmission	P	A
Southern Nuclear	Utilities	Alternative electricity	Birmingham	1990	Nuclear plant operations	P	A
Southern Progress Corporation	Consumer services	Publishing	Birmingham	1886	Magazine publisher	P	A
SouthTrust	Financials	Banks	Birmingham	1887	Acquired by Wachovia in 2004	P	D
SummitMedia	Media	Radio and TV Broadcasters	Birmingham	2013	The company formed to purchase mid-market radio stations being divested by Cox Radio in 2013.	P	A
Torch Technologies	Industrials	Defense	Huntsville	2002	Employee-owned defense contractor	P	A
United Investors Life Insurance Company	Financials	Life insurance	Birmingham	1961	Life insurance and annuities	P	A
Volkert, Inc.	Industrials	Business support services	Mobile	1925	Engineering and infrastructure consulting	P	A
VT Mobile Aerospace Engineering	Industrials	Aerospace	Mobile	1990		P	A
Vulcan Materials Company	Basic materials	General mining	Birmingham	1909	Gravel and crushed stone	P	A
Walter Energy	Basic materials	Coal	Birmingham	1946	Bankrupt in 2015	P	D
Waterman Steamship Corporation	Industrials	Marine transportation	Mobile	1919	Ocean carrier	P	A

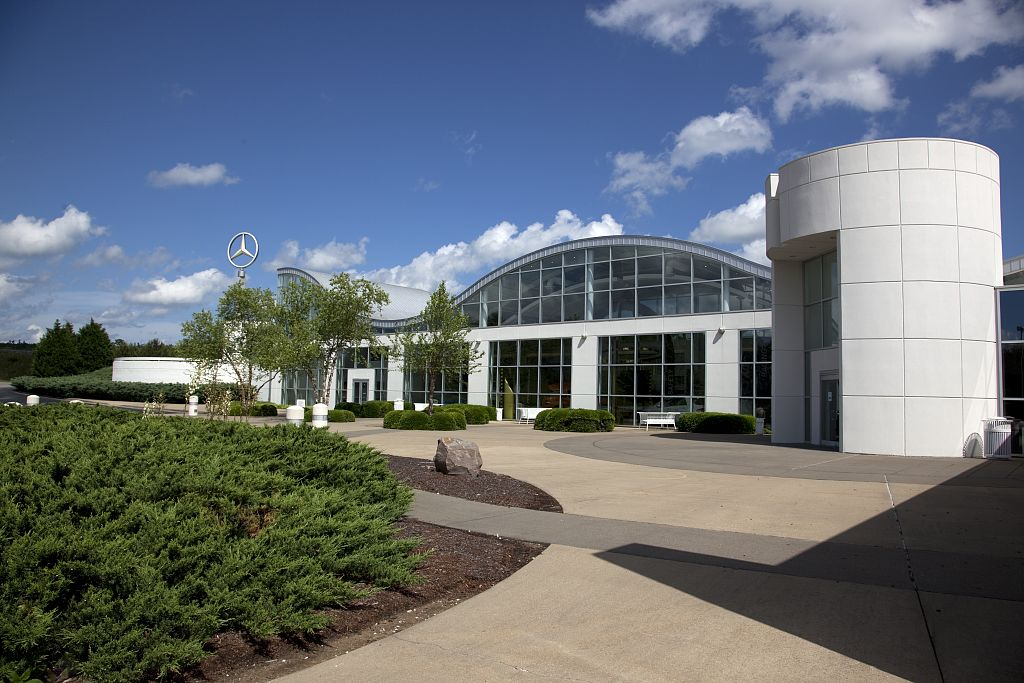
Mercedes-Benz U.S. International plant in Vance, Alabama

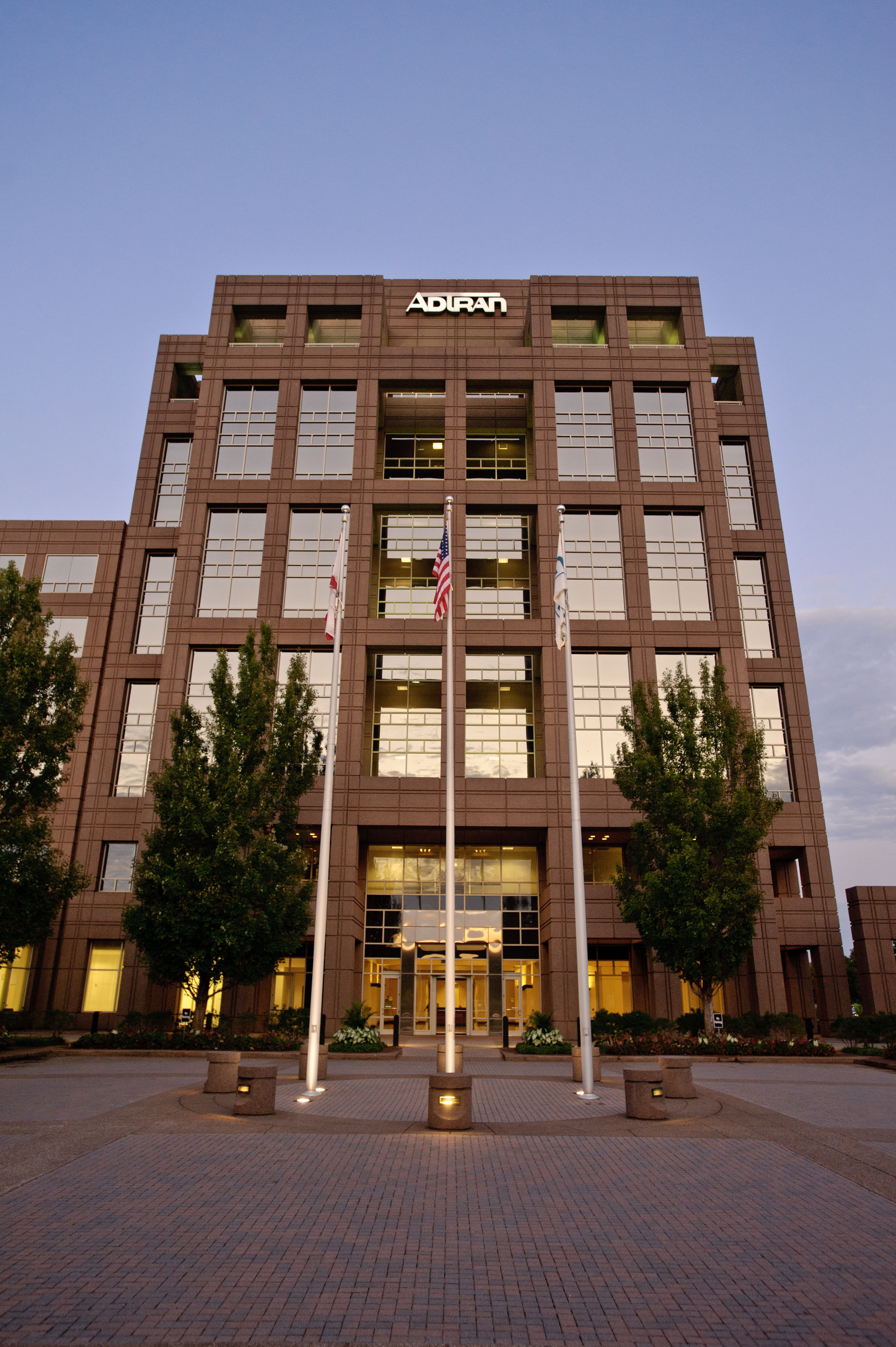
ADTRAN headquarters in Huntsville

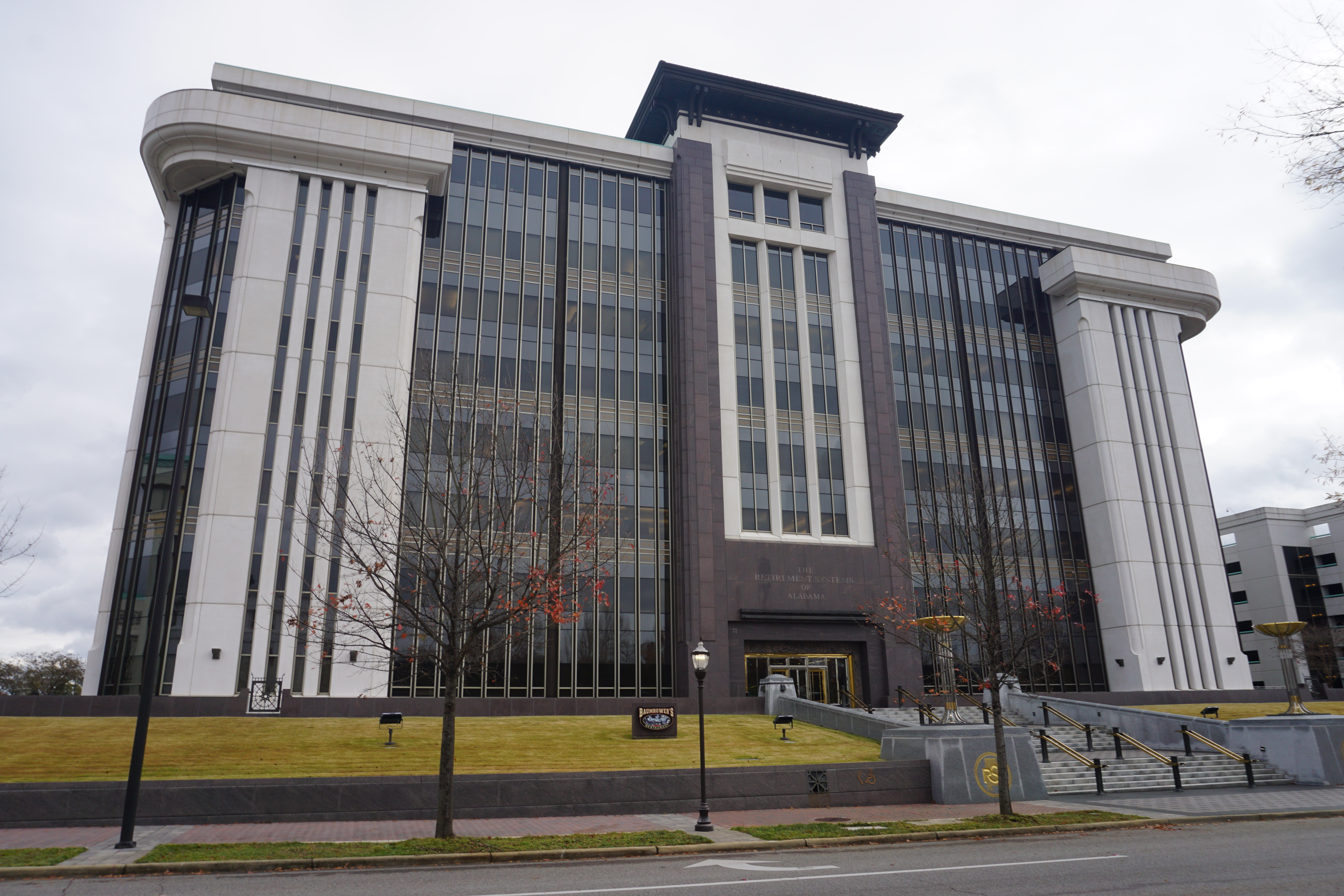
Retirement Systems of Alabama building in Montgomery

== See also ==
- Economy of Alabama
- List of companies of the United States by state
