= List of corporations with a major presence in Birmingham, Alabama =

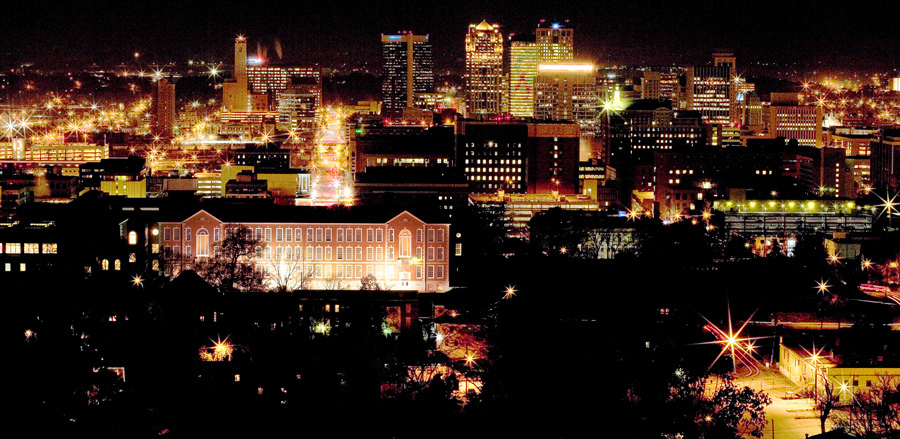
Night skyline of Birmingham, Alabama in December

== Corporations headquartered In Birmingham ==
- Alabama Power - division of Southern Company
- American Cast Iron Pipe Company (ACIPCO)
- Associated Grocers of the Southeast
- B.L. Harbert International - international construction company
- Blue Cross and Blue Shield of Alabama
- Books-A-Million
- Bradley Arant Boult Cummings LLP
- Brasfield & Gorrie
- Buffalo Rock Company
- Chester's International
- Coca-Cola Bottling Company, United
- Birmingham Speed of America, Inc.
- Diagnostic Health Corporation
- Drummond Company
- EBSCO Industries
- Encompass Health - nation's largest rehabilitative services company
- Express Oil Change & Tire Engineers
- Golden Flake
- Gulf South Conference
- Harbert Management Corporation
- Hibbett Sports
- Hoar Construction
- Maynard, Cooper & Gale, P.C.
- McWane
- Medical Properties Trust
- Motion Industries
- Milo's Hamburgers
- Nucor
- O'Neal Steel
- ProAssurance Corporation
- Protective Life Corporation - insurance provider
- Regions Financial Corporation
- Shipt
- Southeastern Conference - SEC
- Southern Company Services
- Southern Family Markets
- Southern Nuclear - nuclear division of Southern Company
- Southern Progress Corporation - publisher of Southern Living magazine, owned by Time Warner
- Southern Research Institute
- Southwestern Athletic Conference - SWAC
- Spire Alabama - Spire Energy
- Surgical Care Affiliates
- Taziki's Mediterranean Cafe
- United Investors Life
- University of Alabama at Birmingham (UAB) college and medical center
- Vulcan Materials Company - largest aggregates producer

=== Fortune 500 ===
As of 2023, Birmingham has two Fortune 500 public companies: Regions Financial Corporation and Vulcan Materials Company. Multiple other Birmingham companies rank in the top 1000.

=== Private companies with revenue over one billion ===
Several privately held companies headquartered in Birmingham have annual revenues exceeding one billion dollars. These include American Cast Iron Pipe Company, Brasfield & Gorrie, BE&K, Drummond Company, EBSCO Industries, Harbert Management Corporation, McWane, and O'Neal Steel.

== Corporations with large operations in Birmingham ==
- AT&T (previously BellSouth) - South Central Bell was headquartered in Birmingham; significant operations in the metro area
- CVS Caremark Corporation
- Jack Henry & Associates
- KBR, Inc. - division headquarters
- Metavante Corporation
- Mueller Water Products - administrative headquarters
- PNC Bank
- Southern Company
- State Farm Insurance Companies - regional and operations headquarters
- SunGard - regional and division headquarters
- Synovus Financial
- U.S. Steel Corporation
- UnitedHealth Group
- Washington Group International - regional headquarters, RUST headquarters
- Wells Fargo & Co. - regional headquarters

== Corporations defunct or formerly headquartered in Birmingham ==
- Alabama National BanCorporation - merged with RBC Bank
- AmSouth Bancorporation - merged with Regions
- Big B Drugs - merged with Revco, now part of CVS
- BioCryst Pharmaceuticals
- Bruno's Supermarkets
- CVS Caremark - moved headquarters in 2004
- Energen Corporation - acquired by Diamondback Energy in 2018
- Golf Channel - moved production to Orlando
- Just For Feet - ceased operations in 2004
- Liberty National Life Insurance Company
- MedPartners - changed name to Caremark Rx
- Saks Incorporated - relocated headquarters to New York City after reorganization
- Sonat, Inc. - merged with El Paso Corporation
- SouthTrust Corporation - merged with Wachovia
- Torchmark Corporation - insurance provider
- Walter Energy, Inc.
