= Economy of Alabama =

Statistics
- GDP: $222.82 billion (2022)
- Gini coefficient: 0.4471 ± 0.0058 (2023)
- Unemployment: 2.9% (Sept. 2024)
- All values, unless otherwise stated, are in US dollars.

The state of Alabama has invested in aerospace, education, health care, banking, and various heavy industries, including automobile manufacturing, mineral extraction, steel production and fabrication. By 2006, crop and animal production in Alabama was valued at $1.5 billion. In contrast to the primarily agricultural economy of the previous century, this was only about one percent of the state's gross domestic product. The number of private farms has declined at a steady rate since the 1960s, as land has been sold to developers, timber companies, and large farming conglomerates.

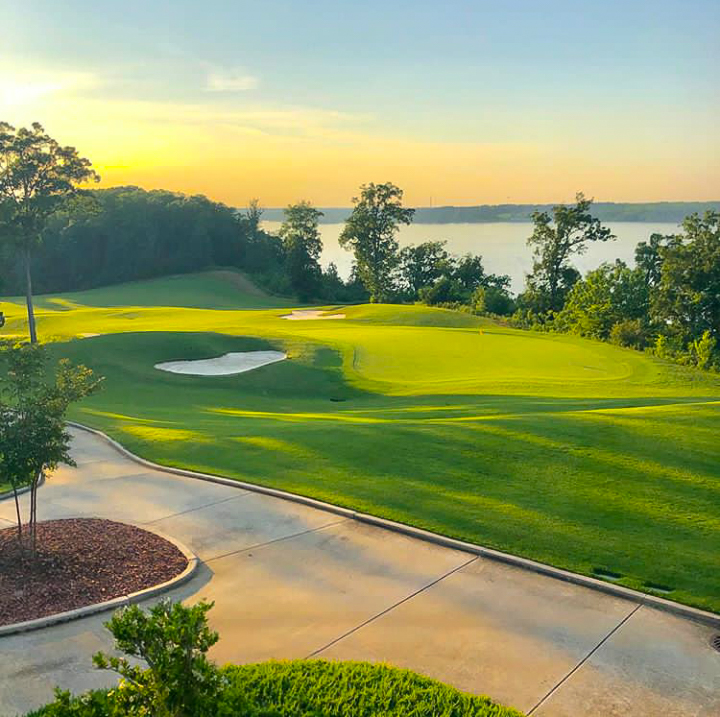
The Robert Trent Jones Golf Trail has a large economic impact on the state.

Non-agricultural employment in 2008 was 121,800 in management occupations; 71,750 in business and financial operations; 36,790 in computer-related and mathematical occupation; 44,200 in architecture and engineering; 12,410 in life, physical, and social sciences; 32,260 in community and social services; 12,770 in legal occupations; 116,250 in education, training, and library services; 27,840 in art, design and media occupations; 121,110 in healthcare; 44,750 in fire fighting, law enforcement, and security; 154,040 in food preparation and serving; 76,650 in building and grounds cleaning and maintenance; 53,230 in personal care and services; 244,510 in sales; 338,760 in office and administration support; 20,510 in farming, fishing, and forestry; 120,155 in construction and mining, gas, and oil extraction; 106,280 in installation, maintenance, and repair; 224,110 in production; and 167,160 in transportation and material moving.

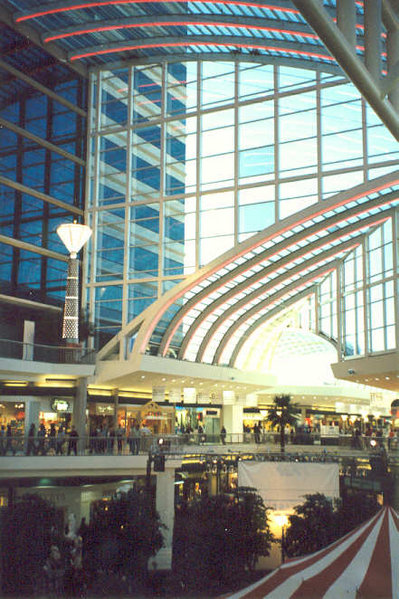
The Riverchase Galleria in Hoover, one of the largest shopping centers in the southeast

According to the U.S. Bureau of Economic Analysis, the 2008 total gross state product was $170 billion, or $29,411 per capita. Alabama's 2012 GDP increased 1.2% from the previous year. The single largest increase came in the area of information. In 2010, per capita income for the state was $22,984.

The state's seasonally adjusted unemployment rate was 5.8% in April 2015. This compared to a nationwide seasonally adjusted rate of 5.4%.

Alabama has no state minimum wage and in February 2016 passed legislation preventing municipalities from setting a local minimum wage. (A Birmingham city ordinance would have raised theirs to $10.10.)

As of 2018, Alabama has the sixth highest poverty rate among states in the U.S. In 2017, United Nations Special Rapporteur Philip Alston toured parts of rural Alabama and observed environmental conditions he said were poorer than anywhere he had seen in the developed world.

== Largest employers ==
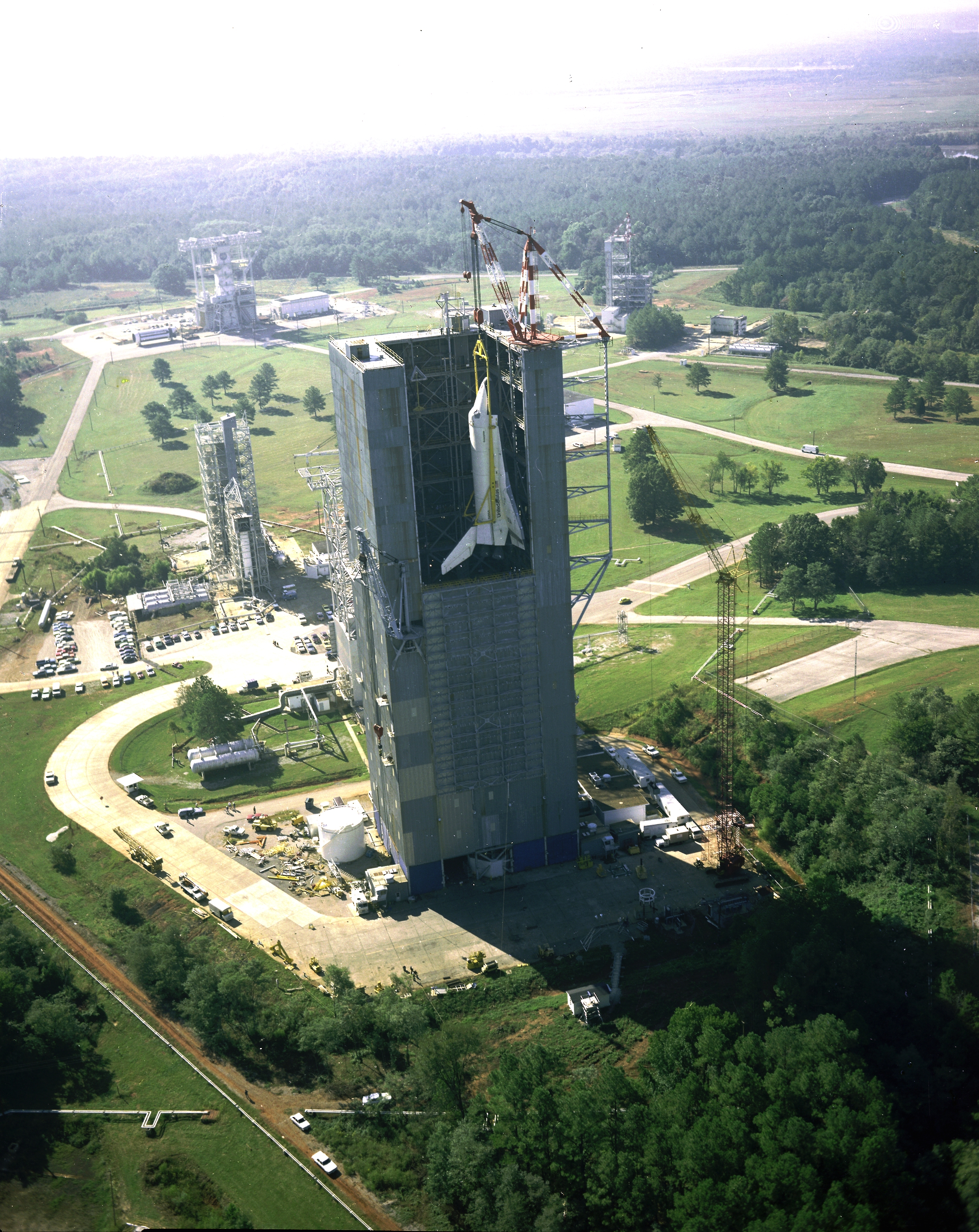
The Space Shuttle Enterprise being tested at Marshall Space Flight Center in 1978

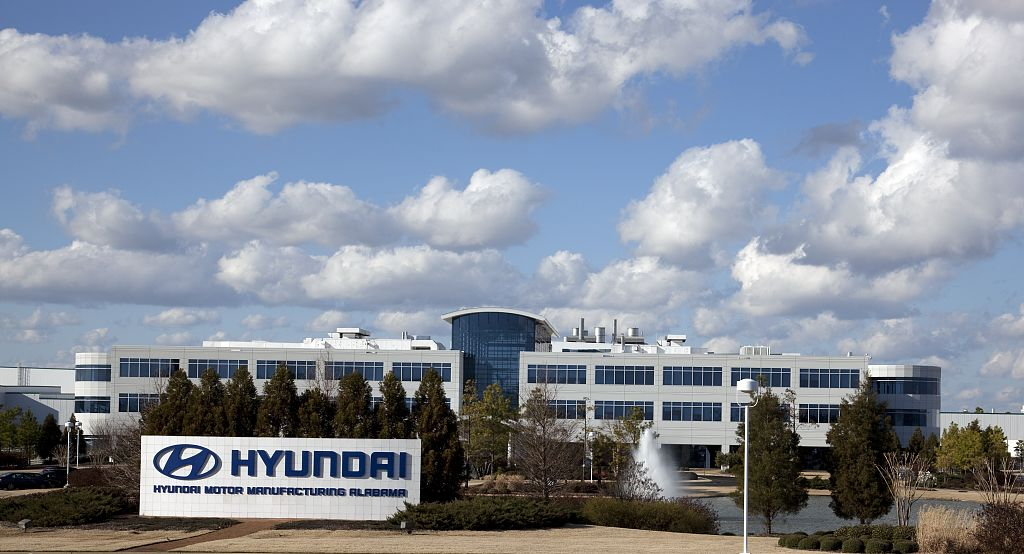
Hyundai Motor Manufacturing Alabama in Montgomery in 2010

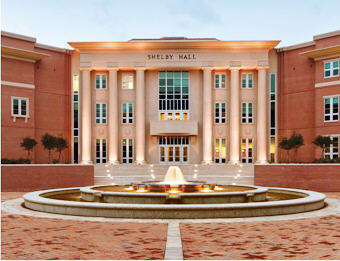
Shelby Hall, School of Computing, at the University of South Alabama in Mobile

The five employers that employed the most employees in Alabama in April 2011 were:

| Employer | Employees |
|---|---|
| Redstone Arsenal | 25,373 |
| University of Alabama at Birmingham (includes UAB Hospital) | 18,750 |
| Maxwell Air Force Base | 12,280 |
| State of Alabama | 9,500 |
| Mobile County Public School System | 8,100 |

The next twenty largest employers, as of 2011, included:

| Employer | Location |
|---|---|
| Anniston Army Depot | Anniston |
| AT&T | Multiple |
| Auburn University | Auburn |
| Baptist Medical Center South | Montgomery |
| Birmingham City Schools | Birmingham |
| City of Birmingham | Birmingham |
| DCH Health System | Tuscaloosa |
| Huntsville City Schools | Huntsville |
| Huntsville Hospital System | Huntsville |
| Hyundai Motor Manufacturing Alabama | Montgomery |
| Infirmary Health System | Mobile |
| Jefferson County Board of Education | Birmingham |
| Marshall Space Flight Center | Huntsville |
| Mercedes-Benz U.S. International | Vance |
| Montgomery Public Schools | Montgomery |
| Regions Financial Corporation | Multiple |
| Boeing | Multiple |
| University of Alabama | Tuscaloosa |
| University of South Alabama | Mobile |
| Walmart | Multiple |

== Agriculture ==
Alabama's agricultural outputs include poultry and eggs, cattle, fish, plant nursery items, peanuts, cotton, grains such as corn and sorghum, vegetables, milk, soybeans, and peaches. Although known as "The Cotton State", Alabama ranks between eighth and tenth in national cotton production, according to various reports, with Texas, Georgia and Mississippi comprising the top three.

=== Aquaculture ===
Aquaculture is a large part of the economy of Alabama. Alabamians began to practice aquaculture in the early 1960s. U.S. farm-raised catfish is the 8th most popular seafood product in America. By 2008, approximately 4,000 people in Alabama were employed by the catfish industry and Alabama produced 132 million pounds of catfish. In 2020, Alabama produced 1/3 of the United States' farm-raised catfish. The total 2020 sales of catfish raised in Alabama equaled $307 million but by 2020 the total employment of Alabamians fell to 2,442.

From the early 2000s to 2020, the Alabamian catfish industry has declined from 250 farms and 4 processors to 66 farms and 2 processors. Reasons for this decline include increased feed prices, catfish alternatives, COVID-19's impact on restaurant sales, disease, and fish size.

== Industry ==
Alabama's industrial outputs include iron and steel products (including cast-iron and steel pipe); paper, lumber, and wood products; mining (mostly coal); plastic products; cars and trucks; and apparel. In addition, Alabama produces aerospace and electronic products, mostly in the Huntsville area, the location of NASA's George C. Marshall Space Flight Center and the U.S. Army Materiel Command, headquartered at Redstone Arsenal.

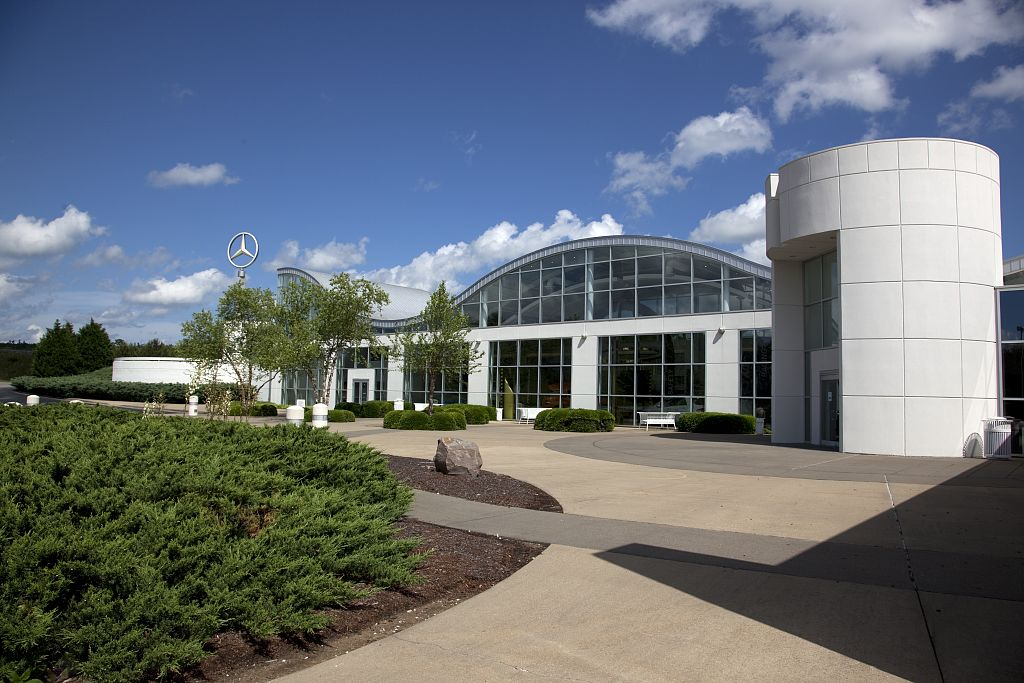
Mercedes-Benz U.S. International in Tuscaloosa County was the first automotive facility to locate within the state.

A great deal of Alabama's economic growth since the 1990s has been due to the state's expanding automotive manufacturing industry. Located in the state are Honda Manufacturing of Alabama, Hyundai Motor Manufacturing Alabama, Mercedes-Benz U.S. International, and Toyota Motor Manufacturing Alabama, as well as their various suppliers. Since 1993, the automobile industry has generated more than 67,800 new jobs in the state. Alabama currently ranks 4th in the nation for vehicle exports.

Automakers accounted for approximately a third of the industrial expansion in the state in 2012. The eight models produced at the state's auto factories totaled combined sales of 74,335 vehicles for 2012. The strongest model sales during this period were the Hyundai Elantra compact car, the Mercedes-Benz GL-Class sport utility vehicle and the Honda Ridgeline sport utility truck.

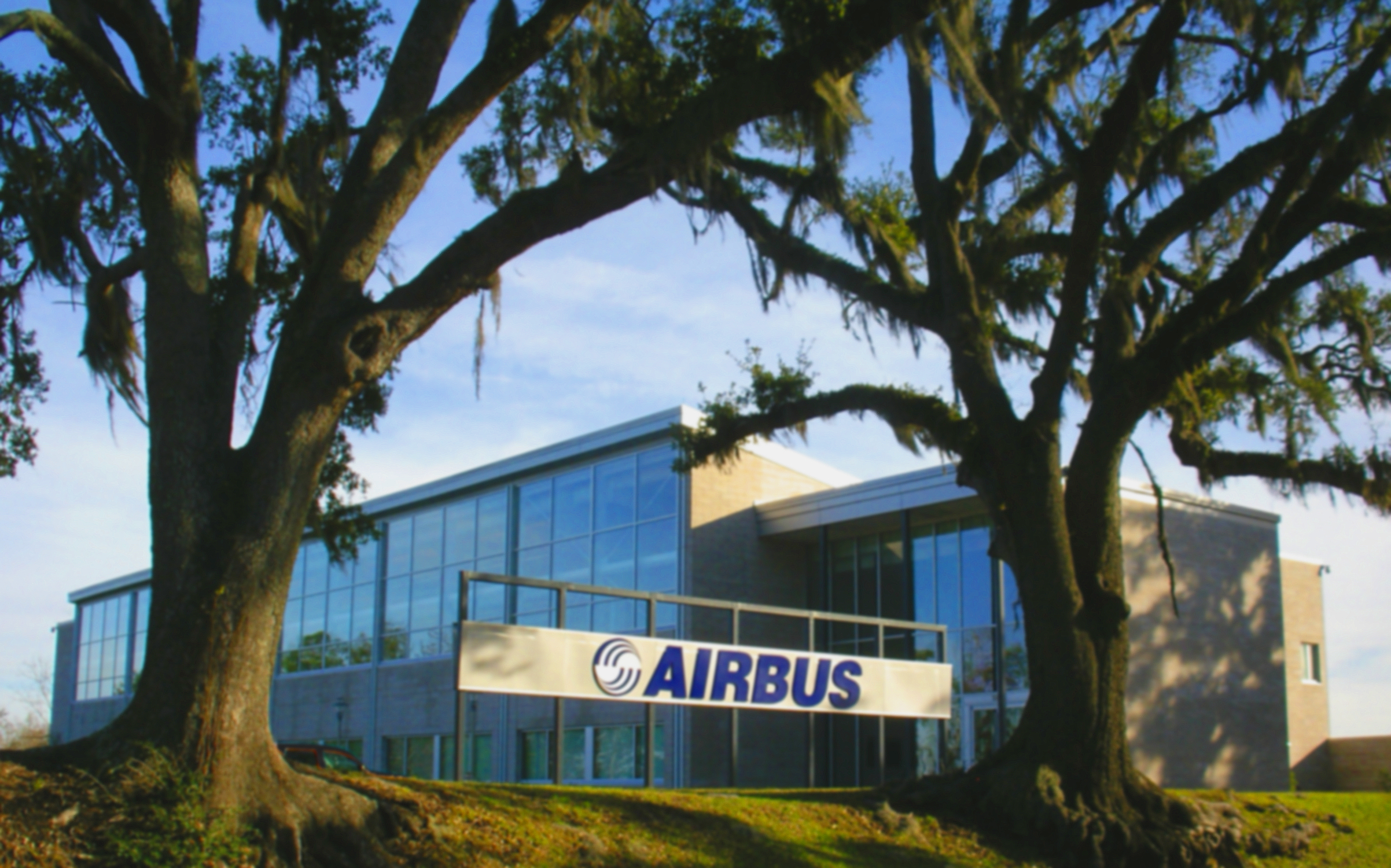
Airbus Mobile Engineering Center at the Brookley Aeroplex in Mobile

Steel producers Outokumpu, Nucor, SSAB, ThyssenKrupp, and U.S. Steel have facilities in Alabama and employ more than 10,000 people. In May 2007, German steelmaker ThyssenKrupp selected Calvert in Mobile County for a 4.65 billion combined stainless and carbon steel processing facility. ThyssenKrupp's stainless steel division, Inoxum, including the stainless portion of the Calvert plant, was sold to Finnish stainless steel company Outokumpu in 2012. The remaining portion of the ThyssenKrupp plant had final bids submitted by ArcelorMittal and Nippon Steel for $1.6 billion in March 2013. Companhia Siderúrgica Nacional submitted a combined bid for the mill at Calvert, plus a majority stake in the ThyssenKrupp mill in Brazil, for $3.8 billion. In July 2013, the plant was sold to ArcelorMittal and Nippon Steel.

The Hunt Refining Company, a subsidiary of Hunt Consolidated, Inc., is based in Tuscaloosa and operates a refinery there. The company also operates terminals in Mobile, Melvin, and Moundville. JVC America, Inc. operates an optical disc replication and packaging plant in Tuscaloosa.

The Goodyear Tire and Rubber Company operates a large plant in Gadsden which employs about 1,400 people. It has been in operation since 1929.

Construction of an Airbus A320 family aircraft assembly plant in Mobile was formally announced by Airbus CEO Fabrice Brégier from the Mobile Convention Center on July 2, 2012. The plans include a $600 million factory at the Brookley Aeroplex for the assembly of the A319, A320 and A321 aircraft. Construction began in 2013, with plans for it to become operable by 2015 and produce up to 50 aircraft per year by 2017. The assembly plant is the company's first factory to be built within the United States. It was announced on February 1, 2013, that Airbus had hired Alabama-based Hoar Construction to oversee construction of the facility. The factory officially opened on September 14, 2015, covering one million square feet on 53 acres of flat grassland.

== Tourism and entertainment ==
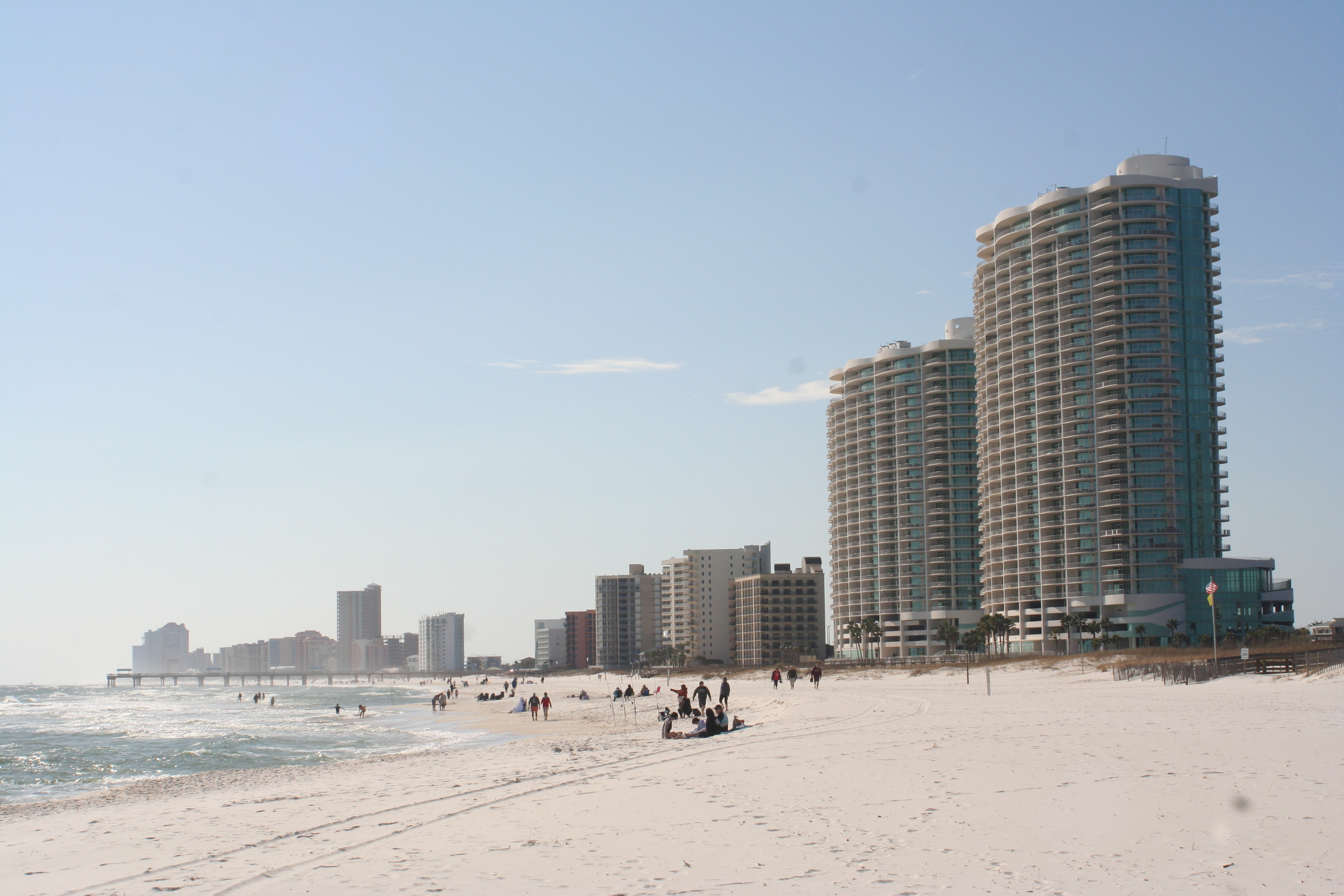
Alabama's beaches are one of the state's major tourist destinations.

According to Business Insider, Alabama ranked 14th in most popular states to visit in 2014. An estimated 26 million tourists visited the state in 2017 and spent $14.3 billion, providing directly or indirectly 186,900 jobs in the state, which includes 362,000 International tourists spending $589 million.

The state is home to various attractions, natural features, parks and events that attract visitors from around the globe, notably the annual Hangout Music Festival, held on the public beaches of Gulf Shores; the Alabama Shakespeare Festival, one of the ten largest Shakespeare festivals in the world; the Robert Trent Jones Golf Trail, a collection of championship caliber golf courses distributed across the state; casinos such as Victoryland; amusement parks such as Alabama Splash Adventure; the Riverchase Galleria, one of the largest shopping centers in the southeast; Guntersville Lake, voted the best lake in Alabama by Southern Living Magazine readers; and the Alabama Museum of Natural History, the oldest museum in the state.

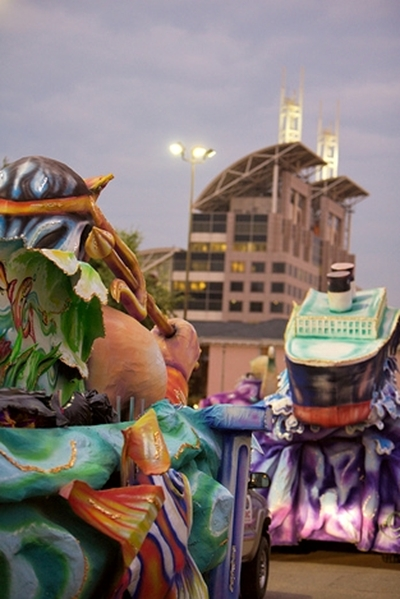
Mobile is the birthplace of Mardi Gras in the U.S.

Mobile is known for having the oldest organized Mardi Gras celebration in the United States, beginning in 1703. It was also host to the first formally organized Mardi Gras parade in the U.S. in 1830, a tradition that continues to this day. Mardi Gras is an official state holiday in Mobile and Baldwin counties.

In 2018, Mobile's Mardi Gras parade was the state's top event, producing the most tourists with an attendance of 892,811. The top attraction was the U.S. Space & Rocket Center in Huntsville with an attendance of 849,981, followed by the Birmingham Zoo with 543,090. Of the parks and natural destinations, Alabama's Gulf Coast topped the list with 6,700,000 visitors.

Alabama has historically been a popular region for film shoots due to its diverse landscapes and contrast of environments. Movies filmed in Alabama include Close Encounters of the Third Kind, Get Out, 42, Selma, Big Fish, The Final Destination, Due Date, and Need for Speed.

== Healthcare ==
UAB Hospital, USA Health University Hospital, Huntsville Hospital, and Children's Hospital of Alabama are the only Level I trauma centers in Alabama. UAB is the largest state government employer in Alabama, with a workforce of about 18,000. A 2017 study found that Alabama had the least competitive health insurance market in the country, with Blue Cross and Blue Shield of Alabama having a market share of 84% followed by UnitedHealth Group at 7%.

== Banking ==
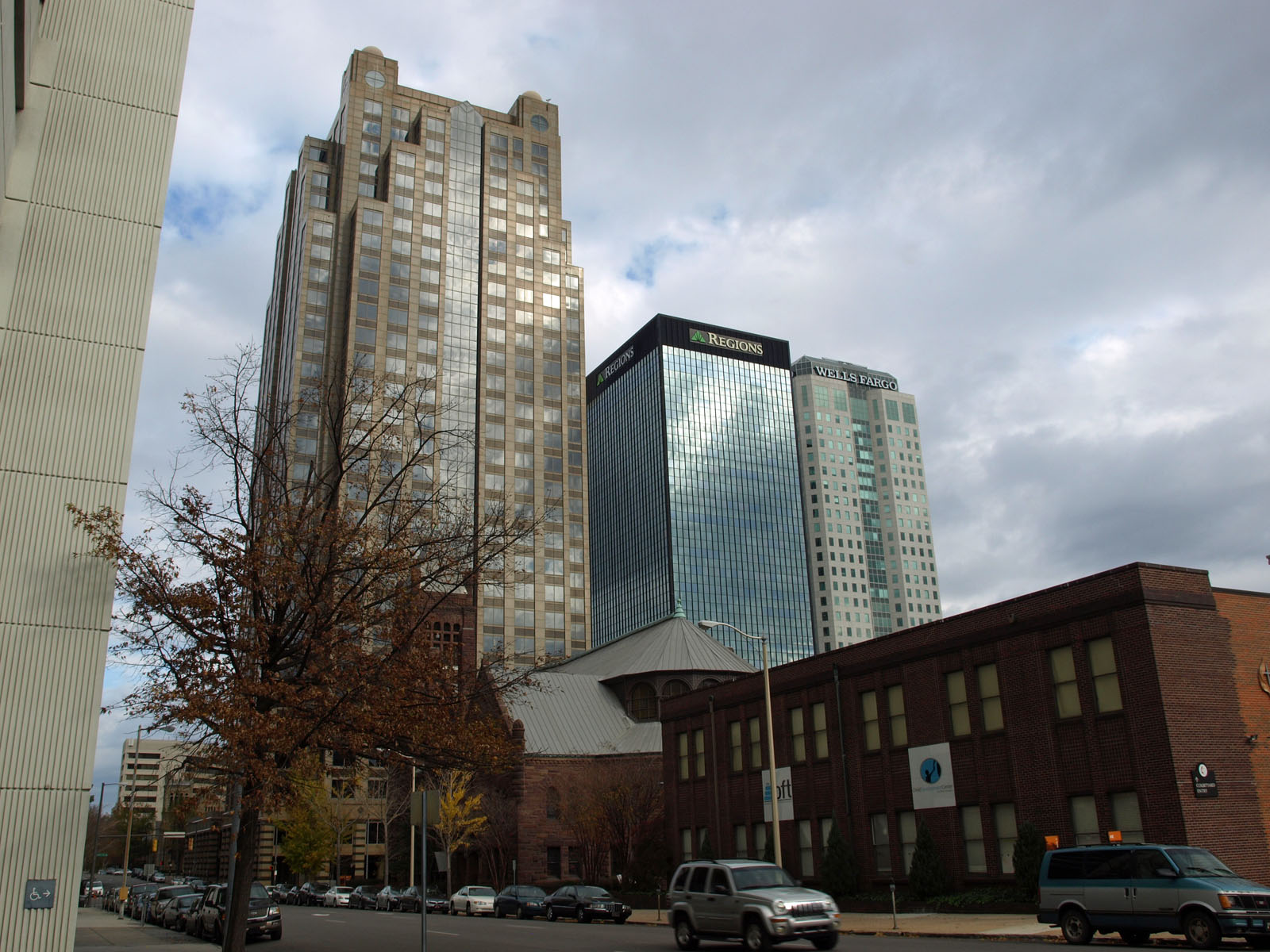
Regions-Harbert Plaza, Regions Center, and Wells Fargo Tower in Birmingham's financial district

Regions Financial Corporation is the largest bank headquartered in or operating in Alabama. PNC Financial Services and Wells Fargo also have a major presence in Alabama.

Wells Fargo has a regional headquarters, an operations center campus, and a $400 million data center in Birmingham. Many smaller banks are also headquartered in the Birmingham area, including ServisFirst and New South Federal Savings Bank. Birmingham also serves as the headquarters for several large investment management companies, including Harbert Management Corporation.

== Electronics and communications ==
Telecommunications provider AT&T, formerly BellSouth, has a major presence in Alabama with several large offices in Birmingham.

Many technology companies are headquartered in Huntsville, such as ADTRAN, a network access company; Intergraph, a computer graphics company; and Avocent, an IT infrastructure company.

== Construction ==
Brasfield & Gorrie, BE&K, Hoar Construction, and B.L. Harbert International, based in Alabama and subsidiaries of URS Corporation, are all routinely included in the Engineering News-Record lists of top design, international construction, and engineering firms.

== See also ==
- List of Alabama companies
