= Samuel DiPiazza =

American business executive

Samuel A. DiPiazza Jr.
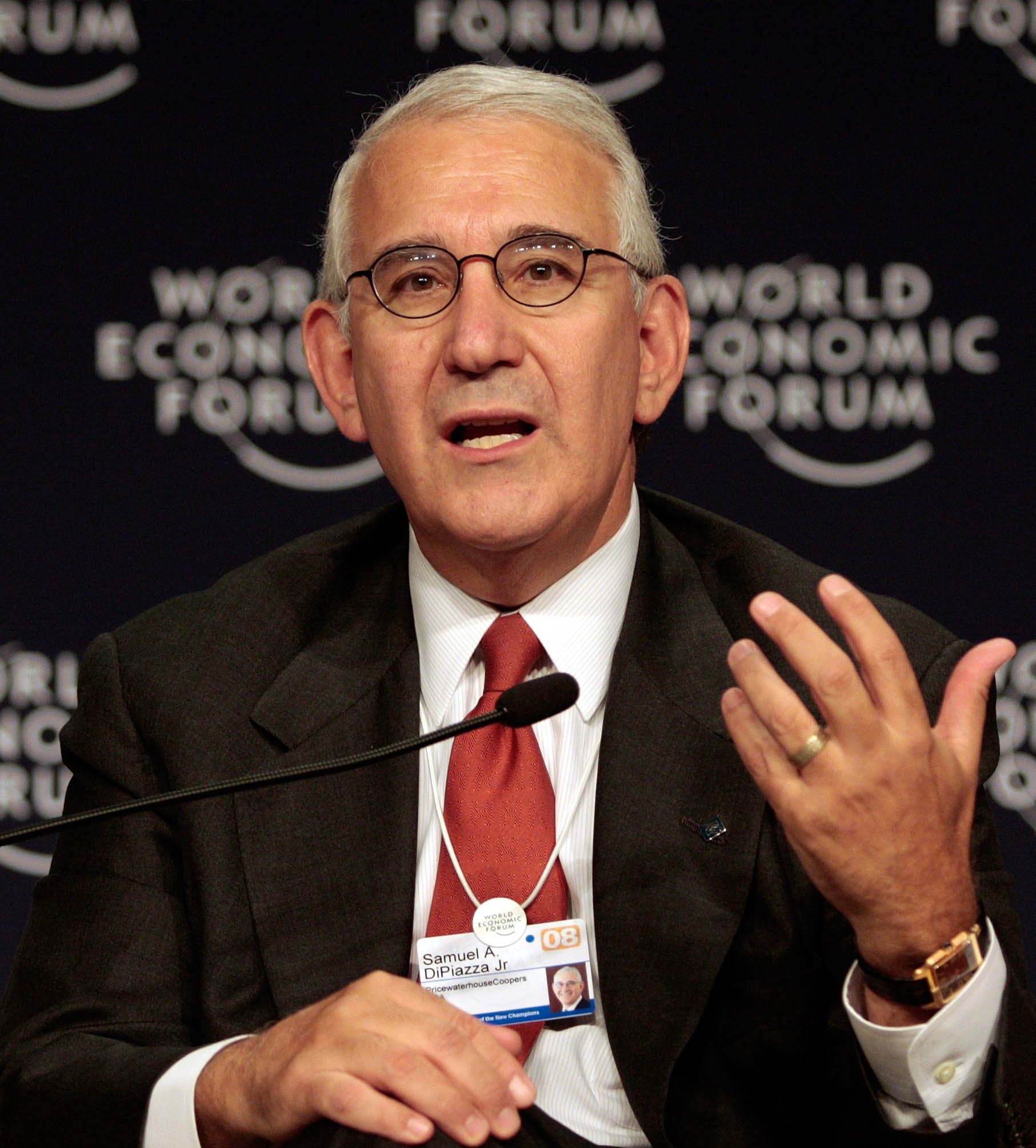
- DiPiazza speaks at the World Economic Forum in Davos, Switzerland in 2008.
- Born: Brooklyn, New York
- Education: University of Houston (MAccy); University of Alabama (BS)
- Employer: Warner Bros. Discovery (formerly)
- Title: Chairman
- Board member of: Warner Bros. Discovery; AT&T; ProAssurance; Regions Financial Corporation
- Website: Biography

Samuel A. DiPiazza Jr. is an American business executive who served as the chairman of Warner Bros. Discovery.

== Early life and education ==
He received dual degrees in accounting and economics from the University of Alabama where he became a member of Theta Chi fraternity. He then went on to get his Master of Accountancy from the University of Houston. He is a licensed CPA.

== Career ==
DiPiazza joined Coopers & Lybrand in 1973 and was admitted to partnership in 1979. He held a series of senior leadership roles within the firm, including Regional Managing Partner for the Midwest Region and Regional Managing Partner for the New York Metro Region. Following the 1998 merger of Coopers & Lybrand and Price Waterhouse to form PricewaterhouseCoopers (PwC), DiPiazza served as Americas Leader for Tax and Legal Services and was elected Chairman and Senior Partner of the U.S. firm in 2000.

In 2002, DiPiazza was appointed Global Chief Executive Officer of PricewaterhouseCoopers International Limited. During his tenure, PwC expanded its global operations and reported significant growth in its financial services, capital markets, and advisory practices as banking, asset management, and structured finance activity increased worldwide.

DiPiazza served as Global CEO through the build-up to and onset of the global financial crisis of 2007–2008. During this period, PwC acted as auditor to numerous major financial institutions, several of which later required government support, emergency mergers, or entered bankruptcy. In the aftermath of the crisis, PwC and other Big Four accounting firms faced scrutiny and criticism from regulators, lawmakers, and commentators regarding audit quality, conflicts of interest, and the role of the profession in the financial system.

As a private partnership, PwC does not publicly disclose individual executive compensation. However, contemporaneous reporting placed compensation for global Big Four chief executives in the multi-million-dollar range annually. DiPiazza retired from PwC in 2009.

Following his retirement from PwC in 2009, DiPiazza joined Citigroup, where he served as Vice Chairman of the Global Corporate and Investment Bank from 2011 to 2014. In this role, he advised senior leadership on strategy, risk management, and client relationships within Citi’s investment banking and capital markets businesses.

After leaving Citigroup, DiPiazza took on a number of board and governance roles at large public companies and nonprofit institutions, including AT&T, ProAssurance, Regions Financial Corporation, and Jones Lang LaSalle.

== Boards and memberships ==
DiPiazza has served on a number of corporate and nonprofit boards and committees throughout his career. He has been a board member and chairman at several major organizations.

- He served on the board of the World Trade Center Memorial Foundation.
- DiPiazza was elected to the ProAssurance board of directors as Chairman of the Audit Committee on January 21, 2014.
- He served on the board of directors of AT&T from 2015 until 2022.
- DiPiazza joined the Mayo Clinic Board of Trustees in 2010 and was elected Chairman in 2014; he served in leadership roles through at least 2021.
- He is a member of the board of directors of Regions Financial Corporation and Jones Lang LaSalle (JLL).
