= S. Toomer =

American politician

Member of the Alabama House of Representatives from Lee County
- In office 1870–1872 Serving with Jos. Simms

Personal details
- Died: March 26, 1872

Sheldon Lyne Toomer Sr. (died March 26, 1872) was an American politician who was one of the first two Alabama House of Representatives members for Lee County, Alabama. He was elected in 1870 and served alongside Jos. Simms. He was a veteran of the American Civil War. His son was Sheldon L. Toomer.
