= Sheldon L. Toomer =

American politician (1872–1957)

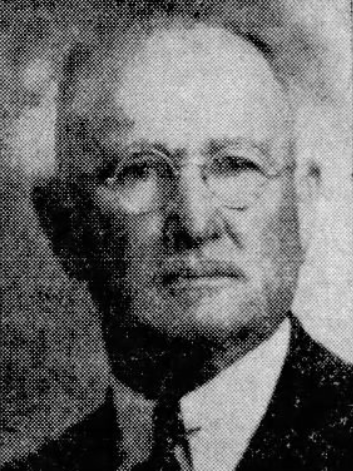
- Toomer in the 1950s

Member of the Alabama Senate from the 27th district
- In office January 1943 – January 1947

Member of the Alabama House of Representatives from Lee County
- In office 1935–1939

Member of the Auburn, Alabama City Council
- In office 1898–1924

Mayor of Auburn, Alabama
- In office August 16, 1918 – October 7, 1918
- Preceded by: C. S. Yarbrough
- Succeeded by: J. W. Wright

Personal details
- Born: July 14, 1872 Opelika, Alabama, US
- Died: September 27, 1957 (aged 85) Auburn, Alabama, US

Sheldon Lyne Toomer Jr. (July 14, 1872 – September 27, 1957) was an American politician and businessman. A member of the Alabama Democratic Party, he served in the Alabama House of Representatives from 1935 to 1939, and in the Alabama Senate from 1943 to 1947. He also served as the mayor of Auburn, Alabama in 1918.

== Education ==
Sheldon Toomer attended Auburn University, which was known at the time as the Agricultural and Mechanical College of Alabama. During his time at Auburn, he played halfback for the 1892 Auburn Tigers football team, the first football team at Auburn. He was also a member of Alpha Tau Omega. He graduated in 1893 with a Bachelor of Science in chemistry and agriculture. He spent three years at Texas A&M teaching, before returning to Auburn in 1896 and graduating with a degree in pharmacy in 1897.

== Business career ==
Toomer founded Toomer's Drugs on Toomer's Corner in 1896. He ended up buying the building from J. M. Thomas for $7,000 around the year 1906. He sold the drug business to McAdory "Mac" Libscomb in 1952, who ended up buying the building later in 1974.

Toomer was tired of having to travel seven miles, nearly a full-day round trip, to Opelika just to go to the bank, so he decided to try and form an Auburn bank. He convinced Bennett Battle Ross, Charles Allen Cary, Thomas Bragg, Oliver Steadham, Thomas O Wright, and W. Pierce Zuber to found an Auburn bank. Together they got 33 total investors to commit $25,000 to buying stocks. This formed the Bank of Auburn, known now as AuburnBank, who opened their doors on January 3, 1907. He served as president of the bank for over 4 decades starting in 1908.

== Political career ==
Toomer served on the Auburn City Council for 24 years starting in 1898, and served as the mayor of Auburn in 1918. He represented Lee County in the Alabama House of Representatives from 1935 to 1939. He then ran for State Senate in the Alabama 27th district on November 3, 1942, where he was elected unopposed with 880 votes. He was sworn into office in January 1943, where he served for the next 4 years.

== Personal life ==
Toomer's parents were Sheldon Toomer Sr., who was the first state representative of Lee County, and Wilhelmina "Willie" Lyne. Toomer married Florence Marguerite Prendergast on June 21, 1919, who taught French at Auburn University. They had two children, Margaret Hall and Sheldon Archer Toomer.
