= Germans in Alabama =

Ethnic group in Alabama

There is a German national population residing in Alabama, and historically there was a German immigrant population.

In 1866, the German immigrants founded Cullman, Alabama.

Wernher von Braun, formerly affiliated with Nazi Germany, helped establish the space industry in Huntsville, Alabama.

The German companies began widespread business operations in Alabama when Mercedes-Benz established its first assembly plant in the U.S. in Alabama, Mercedes-Benz U.S. International; in 1993 it selected Vance, a town west of Birmingham, and east of Tuscaloosa.

The Alabama State German Evangelical Holiness Pentecostal Church was founded in 1935 by Rev. Dorothy Forrest Trumbo and her husband, Charles Ross Trumbo, after the fall of the German United Protestant Church of The South, in Fyffe, Alabama.
