= Toomer's Corner =

Intersection in Auburn, Alabama; known for celebrations involving the Auburn Tigers

Toomer's Corner is a street corner located at the intersection of Magnolia Avenue and College Street, and marks the northeastern-most reach of the campus of Auburn University, and the beginning of downtown Auburn, Alabama. Two landmarks are located on Toomer's Corner, the Bank of Auburn (now a branch of PNC Bank) and Toomer's Drugs Pharmacy, which was the first establishment in the city with a telegraph, and the intersection is patterned in bricks forming the paw print logo of the Auburn Tigers athletic teams (it was formerly painted on regular concrete).

The employees at Toomer's Drugs Pharmacy, after discovering that Auburn had won a football game before the team broadcast away games on radio, would throw the ticker tape from their telegraph onto the power lines. The area's primary source of popularity comes from an Auburn tradition that arose over a century ago and has not ceased over the years in bringing people nearby to the landmark.

== History and tradition ==
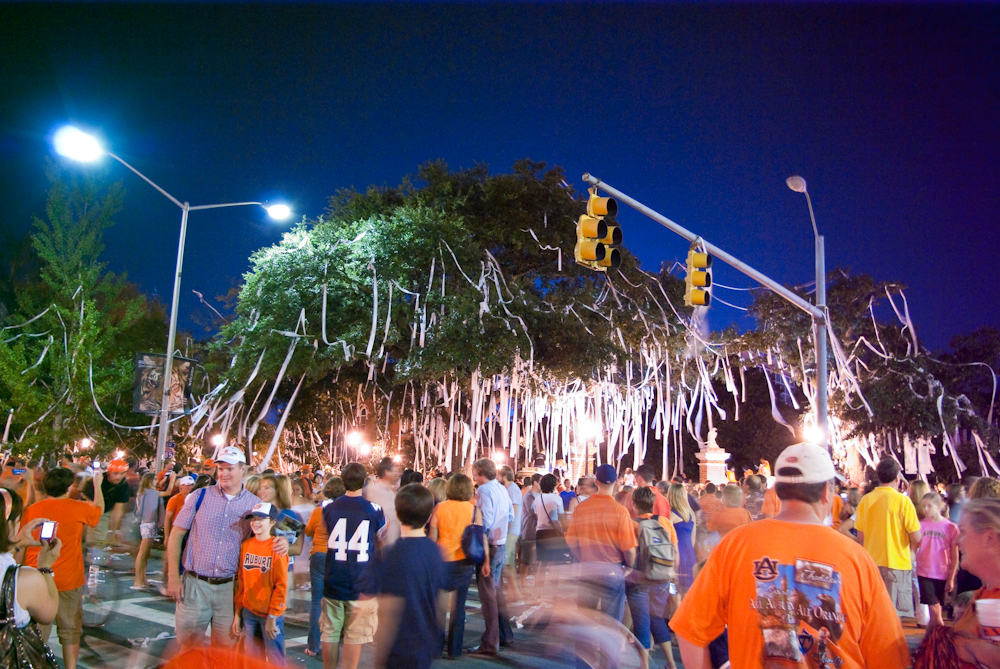
A night for celebration on Toomer's Corner

Toomer's Corner is named after businessman and former State Senator Sheldon Toomer, a former halfback for the first Auburn squad in 1892. Toomer founded Toomer's Drugs in 1896 with a $500 loan from John Reese, and later founded the Bank of Auburn on the corner of Magnolia Avenue and College Street in 1907. In 1952, Toomer sold the pharmacy to Mac and Elizabeth Lipscomb, who elected not to rename it. In 1962 Auburn fans and students began to celebrate the games by covering the power lines outside the pharmacy and the trees directly opposite with toilet paper. There is much controversy over when "rolling the corner" became a celebration for all things Auburn. It is theorized by David Housel that it began in 1972 when #9 Auburn scored an upset in the Iron Bowl against #2 Alabama, a game remembered by the title "Punt Bama Punt".

Initially, the rolling of the corner was sparked by the employees of Toomer's Drugs pharmacy. They used an inventive method to signal Auburn's victory during away games by throwing ticker tape from their telegraph onto power lines outside the store. In 1984, the drug store was sold to Mark Morgan. Five years after the store was sold to Morgan, the Iron Bowl made its first stop in Auburn and was one of the first times Toomer's Corner was covered with endless rolls of toilet paper. The store was resold a couple of times in the 1990s but the tradition that Toomer's Corner sparked has remained. The power lines have since been relocated under the ground but Auburn's tradition of rolling the trees on the southeast part of the corner never slowed. As of 2019, Toomer's Corner continues to bring fans, residents, and even visitors of Auburn around the historic corner.

== Vandalism ==
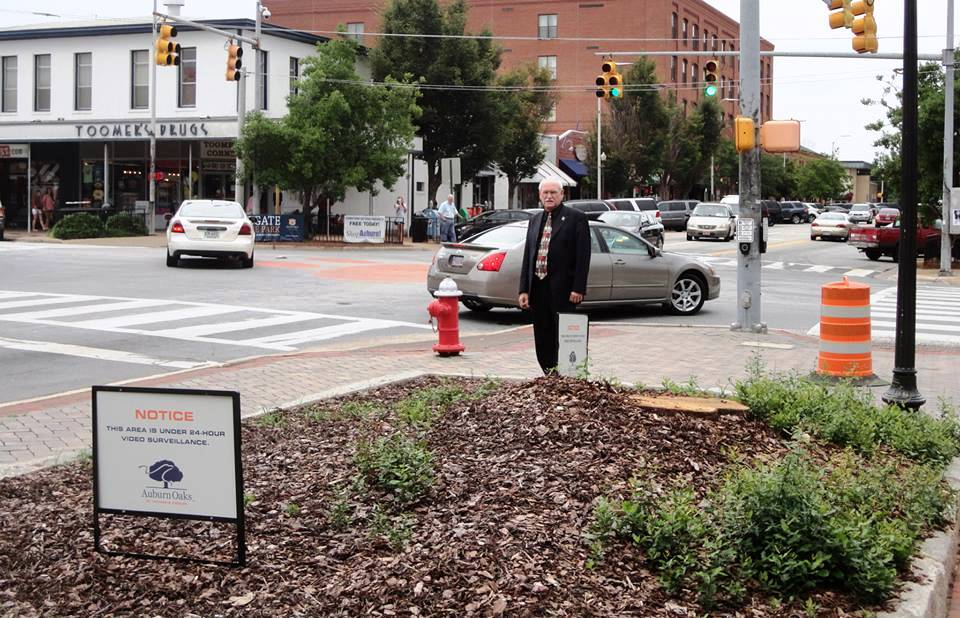
Toomer's Corner after the poisoned trees had been removed and the area placed under 24-hour surveillance

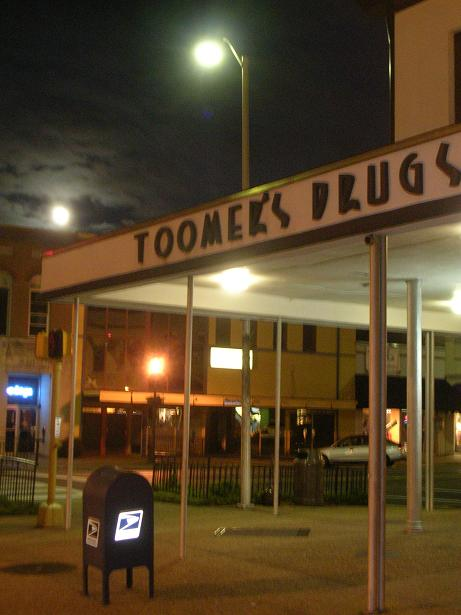
Toomer's Drugs pharmacy on Toomer's Corner.

The large live oak trees formerly on the corner had been vandalized on multiple occasions. In 2010, the trees were poisoned using an herbicide called Spike 80DF. Two months later, on January 27, 2011, the perpetrator called the Paul Finebaum sports radio talk show to confess the actions, which were presumed to have been driven by Alabama's loss the previous week in the Iron Bowl against Auburn in 2010. The phone call was tracked and the perpetrator, Harvey Updyke, was arrested. Updyke, formerly of Dadeville, Alabama, was sentenced to pay a fine and spend time in jail, after which time he was placed on probation. Efforts to save the poisoned trees were unsuccessful. The corner was eventually restored with untainted soil and replanted with two new grown southern live oaks. While the soil and trees were replaced, people were restricted from rolling the trees with paper until they acclimated to their environment.

In 2016, the trees were replaced a second time after they were set on fire by Jochen Wiest following Auburn’s win over Louisiana State University. Attempts were made to save the trees, but the trees were determined unlikely to survive. The other tree bordering College Street was not affected by the fire, but had failed to grow properly for unknown reasons. In February 2017, two fully grown trees were planted to replace the tree that had failed and the tree that had been lit ablaze.
