= Fibes Drums =

American musical instrument manufacturer

- Type: Private (1966–79); Brand (1979–94)
- Industry: Musical instruments
- Founded: 1966
- Founder: Bob Grauso and John Morena
- Defunct: 1994; 32 years ago
- Fate: Acquired by C.F. Martin in 1979
- Headquarters: South Farmingdale, New York, United States
- Products: Drum kits and sticks

Fibes Drum Company was an American musical instrument manufacturing company that produced drum kits. Founded in 1966, it was acquired by guitar manufacturing company C. F. Martin & Company in Nazareth, Pennsylvania, in 1970. It sold the Fibes assets to Jim Corder in 1979, who subsequently established his own company, Corder Drums. The "Fibes" name was sold to another party, remaining for a brief time as a drum stick brand, which use ceased in 1994.

== History ==
The company was founded in 1966 by Bob Grauso, a drummer, and John Morena, a drummer and composite materials professional. Fibes was a percussion instrument manufacturer notable for its pioneering use of fiberglass composites and transparent acrylic materials in the construction of drum shells. Fibes offered chrome plating on their fiberglass shells as well as a variety of other surface finishes. Chrome plated Fibes snare drums have an appearance that closely matches that of conventional chrome plated metal snare drums made by other manufacturers.

Fibes drums, and particularly Fibes snare drums were used by Buddy Rich, who continued to use the Fibes snare even while an endorser of competing products. Billy Cobham was another drummer that played a Fibes double bass kit. Rat Race Choir founder Steve Luongo also played a double bass kit using the only known set of melodic tom toms 6” 8” 10” 12” 13” 14” 15” 16” and a one of a kind 6” tricolor snare using all three metallic finishes.

The original Fibes Drums Company was located in South Farmingdale, New York and drums produced in that era bear the rectangular badge.

The Fibes company was eventually sold to guitar manufacturer C. F. Martin & Company, in 1970. Subsecquently, all Fibes stock and workforce were moved to "the Martin factory in Nazareth, Pennsylvania, while Garuso retaining control of the company.

Martin sold the Fibes inventory and equipment to Jim Corder, who renamed the business "Corder Drum Company", while the "Fibes" trademark was sold to another party, who had a business agreement with Martin to distribute Fibes drum sticks. Corder then sold the company in 1990 to Sammy Darwin, a radio programming consultant, who operated the company under the name "Darwin" until early 1994.

Tommy Robertson, owner of Tommy's Drum Shop in Austin, Texas, learned of the status of Darwin Drums, and began negotiations to purchase the factory from Darwin. After eight months, an agreement was made. In December 1994, the factory was purchased and moved into a newly designed facility in Austin, Texas. The Fibes trademark was also purchased in December, thus reuniting the original name and product. Fibes has since stopped production of drums.
