= Jos. Simms =

American politician

Jos. M. Simms was an American politician who was one the first two Alabama House of Representatives members for Lee County, Alabama. He was elected in 1870 and served alongside S. Toomer.
