= The Doctors Company =

American medical malpractice insurance company

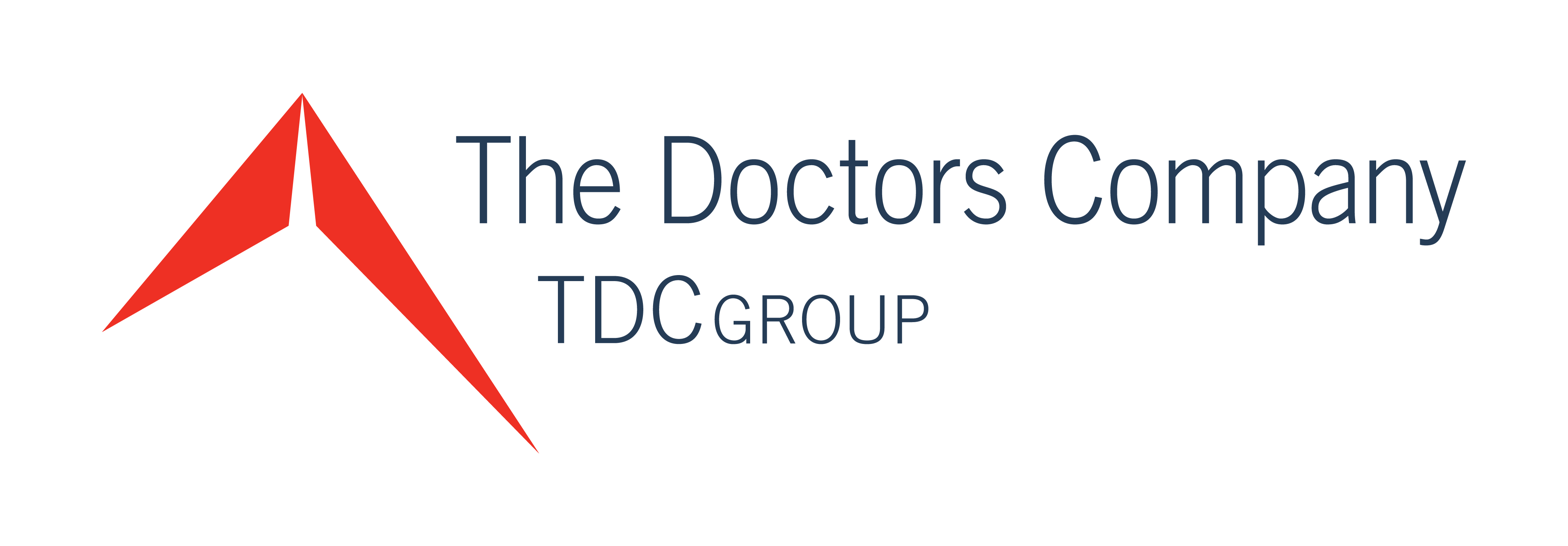
- Type: Member-owned interinsurance exchange
- Industry: Property and casualty insurance
- Founded: April 15, 1976
- Headquarters: Napa County, California (Napa mailing address), United States
- Total assets: US$8,400,000 (2025)
- Website: www.thedoctors.com

The Doctors Company is a medical malpractice insurance company headquartered outside Napa, California, United States.

== Description ==
The Doctors Company claims to be the largest physician-owned medical malpractice.

Founded in 1976, The Doctors Company operates as a member-owned interinsurance exchange, with a number of wholly owned subsidiaries, and is led by a 15-member Board of Governors.

In 2008, The Doctors Company merged with Los Angeles-based SCPIE Holdings, Inc.

In October 2010, the company completed a $386 million purchase of American Physicians Capital, Inc.

On October 19, 2011, The Doctors Company acquired FPIC Insurance Group, Inc., and its subsidiaries First Professionals Insurance Company, Inc.; Advocate, MD Insurance of the Southwest, Inc.; Anesthesiologists Professional Assurance Company; and Intermed Insurance Company.

On June 17, 2014, The Doctors Company acquired Medical Advantage Group, a provider of healthcare, electronic health record (EHR), and telehealth consulting services. The Doctors Company sold Medical Advantage Group to Aledade on May 1, 2024.

On August 8, 2016, The Doctors Company created an excess and surplus lines subsidiary, TDC Specialty Underwriters.

On July 31, 2019, The Doctors Company completed the purchase of Hospitals Insurance Company and FOJP Service Corporation. The transaction created Healthcare Risk Advisors, a new service unit that provides third-party insurance and risk management advisory services.

Collectively, The Doctors Company, TDC Specialty Underwriters, and Healthcare Risk Advisors form the TDC Group of companies (TDC Group).

On June 26, 2026, The Doctors Company completed the purchase of ProAssurance for $25 per share in cash, for a total value of about $1.3 billion.

== Tribute Plan ==
In 2007, The Doctors Company launched a retirement benefit for members called the Tribute(R) Plan. The plan's purpose is to reward members for loyalty to the company and for providing outstanding patient care. The company sets aside funds for eligible members, and those members receive a financial award when they meet plan criteria upon retirement from the practice of medicine.
