= Redstone Federal Credit Union =

Credit union based in Huntsville, Alabama

- Type: Credit Union
- Industry: Financial services
- Founded: 1951; 75 years ago
- Headquarters: Huntsville, Alabama, United States
- Area served: North Alabama/Central Tennessee
- Key people: Joseph H. Newberry, President and CEO
- Products: Savings; Checking; Consumer loans; Mortgages; Credit cards; Investments; Insurance; Small business financing; Cash management
- Total assets: $8.2 billion USD (2025)
- Number of employees: 1,365 (2025)
- Subsidiaries: Redstone Services Group, LLC; Redstone Title Services
- Website: www.redfcu.org

Redstone Federal Credit Union (or RFCU) is an American credit union based in Huntsville, Alabama. Founded in 1951, Redstone is one of Alabama's largest credit union and is federally chartered, regulated and insured through the National Credit Union Administration (NCUA). As of 2021, Redstone Federal Credit Union operated 27 branches across Alabama and Tennessee.

== History ==
Redstone opened on November 28, 1951, in order to serve employees of the Redstone Arsenal. The credit union's initial membership consisted of eleven individuals with assets totaling $55.

In 2018, Redstone Federal Credit Union was recognized as the Credit Union of the Year by the National Association of Federally Insured Credit Unions.

== Services ==
Products and services offered by Redstone Federal Credit Union include savings and checking accounts, small business financing and cash management solutions, and investment and insurance services. The credit union also contains a real estate department which offers mortgage products and home equity loans. Redstone Federal Credit Union members also have access to over 75,000 ATMs located throughout the United States.
