= Torch Technologies =

American engineering and technology company

- Company type: Defense Contractor
- Founded: 2002
- Founders: Bill Roark and Don Holder
- Headquarters: 4090 Memorial Parkway SW, Huntsville, Alabama, United States
- Key people: Bill Roark (Co-Founder); John Watson (President and CEO); Cindy Walz(CFO); Joe Hill (CTO)
- Revenue: ▲$519 million (2019)
- Number of employees: 1100 (2020)
- Website: www.torchtechnologies.com

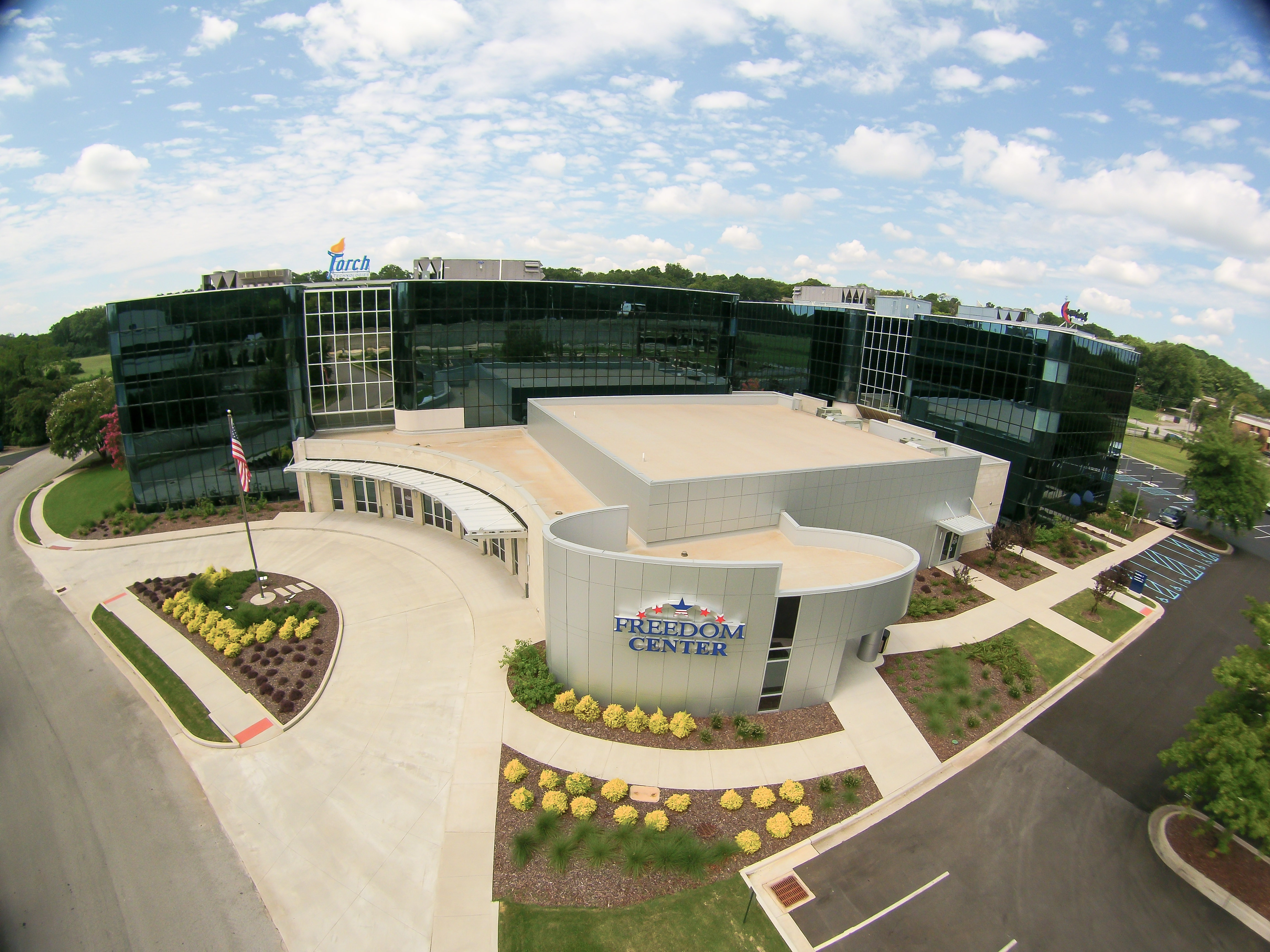
Torch Technologies Headquarters

Torch Technologies is an employee-owned system engineering, applied science, modeling and simulation, and information technology business. Its primary customers are the United States Army Aviation and Missile Command (AMCOM) and the Missile Defense Agency, although it has contracts with other DoD agencies including the Navy and the Air Force. Torch has over 1100 employee-owners and is headquartered in Huntsville, Alabama, with technical offices located in Aberdeen, Maryland, Albuquerque, New Mexico, Boston, Massachusetts, Colorado Springs, Colorado, Detroit, Michigan, Honolulu, Hawaii, Patuxent River, Maryland, and Shalimar, Florida.

== History ==
Torch Technologies was co-founded in 2002 in Huntsville, Alabama, by Bill Roark and Don Holder. Roark and Holder respectively had 30 and 40 years of experience in the Department of Defense research and development programs and other contracts. The company's location was chosen due to its proximity to Redstone Arsenal, which serves as headquarters of several large Army organizations such as AMCOM and offices belonging to US Army Aviation. Upon the company's formation, the co-founders began to aggressively recruit a team of senior engineers, and set out to build a reputation for good service and competitive pricing. In 2005, Roark began to take steps that allowed Torch to become employee-owned (via an ESOP), and the company attained 100% employee ownership in 2010. Roark desired employee-ownership and profit sharing because such management styles have been proven to reduce employee attrition rates and increase job satisfaction. In 2008, Torch began bidding as a prime government contractor. With the receipt of four direct award prime task orders on AMCOM Express, the company won more contracts in two weeks in late 2008 than the previous six years of combined government work. In late 2016, Torch completed a $12 million renovation of the two existing buildings it owns in South Huntsville. Torch received economic incentives from the city of Huntsville, the Tennessee Valley Authority and the state of Alabama to keep its headquarters in south Huntsville as opposed to moving to Cummings Research Park in hopes of growing economic activity in the immediate area. Torch has since had two more major expansions in south Huntsville, with the (2017) completion of a conference center called the Freedom Center and the (2019) completion of the Technology Integration & Prototyping Center. While Torch is headquartered in Huntsville, with eight technical offices located throughout the United States, they have employee-owners located in several additional markets, including California; Ohio, Oklahoma, Massachusetts, Pennsylvania, Texas, Virginia, Kwajalein, and Egypt.

== Areas of Expertise ==
Weapon System Performance Analysis to include sensors/seekers, aerodynamics, guidance and control, target discrimination, endgame performance, and command and control; Modeling and Simulation with emphasis primarily on high-fidelity level simulations including all digital simulations, Software-in-the-Loop (SWIL) and Hardware-in-the-Loop (HWIL) simulations; Information Technology such as distributed simulations/data management, visualization techniques, high performance computers, and network integration; Manned and Unmanned Aviation; Test & Evaluation (T&E); and Advanced Technology Research and Development including development, testing, and implementation of innovative algorithms and software.

== Awards ==
- 2016–2021 Best Workplaces in Consulting & Professional Services by Great Place to Work
- 2021 and 2018 ESOP Company of the Year by the New South Chapter of The ESOP Association
- 2006–2020 Inc 5000 List by Inc. magazine
- 2020 Best Workplaces for Parents by Great Place to Work
- 2020 and 2018 Best Workplaces for Millennials by Great Place to Work
- 2015–2020 Washington Technology "Top 100 Government Contractors" List
- 2017–2020 Bloomberg Government "Top 200" List List
- 2017–2019 Entrepreneur 360 List by Entrepreneur magazine "Entrepreneur 360 List"
- 2016–2018 Best Small and Medium Workplaces by Great Place to Work and FORTUNE
- 2018 2018 Best Workplaces for Millennials by Great Place to Work and FORTUNE
- Outstanding Mechanical Engineering Firm by the American Society of Mechanical Engineers, North Alabama Section
- 2016 Torch was one of 25 companies included in the Forbes list of "The Best Small Companies in America"
- 2015–2018 "Top Tiger" Award of the fastest-growing companies founded, owned, or led by Auburn University alumni
- 2013 Partners in Philanthropy Award by the Community foundation of Huntsville/Madison County
- 2012, 2013 Inc. Magazine's Hire Power Award, given to private firms that create the most jobs nationally
- 2012 Innovations in Employee Ownership Award given by the National Center for Employee-Ownership (NCEO)
- Winner of the 2012 Best Places to Work by the Huntsville/Madison County Chamber of Commerce
- 2011 U.S. SBA Region IV Small Business Prime Contractor of the Year
- 2011 Top Small Company Workplace by Inc. Magazine
- 2009 Entrepreneur of the Year Award, Bill Roark (Torch CEO) selected as Southeast region finalist for the Ernst & Young award
- 2008 Ten Best Companies for Employee Financial Security by The Principal Financial Group
- 2008, 2012, 2016, 2017 and 2018 "Best Places to Work in Huntsville/Madison County"
- 2008 IT/Technology Business of the Year by the Alabama Information Technology Association
- 2007 Small Business of the Year by the Huntsville Chamber of Commerce(Technology Category)
- 2006 AITA Technology Company of the Year by the Alabama Information Technology Association (AITA) (Small Business category finalist)
- 2006 #54 in Entrepreneur Magazine's Hot 100 Fastest Growing New Companies in the United States
- 2005, 2009, and 2015 Award for Marketplace Ethics by the North Alabama Better Business Bureau

== Bibliography ==
- Company Profile - Torch Technologies
- "Torch Technologies, Inc". www.bbb.org. Archived from the original on 2017-06-23.
- "Torch Technologies in Huntsville wins nearly $71 million contract for missile element simulations". www.al.com.
- "Company Overview of Torch Technologies, Inc".
- "Torch Technologies to expand south Huntsville campus, create 150 new jobs". Archived from the original on 2021-02-26.
