= O'Neal Industries =

O'Neal Industries, Inc.
- Type: Private
- Industry: Metals Service Center
- Founded: 1921
- Founders: Kirkman O’Neal
- Headquarters: Birmingham, Alabama, USA
- Key people: Craft O'Neal (chairman & CEO); Ruffner Page (president & COO)
- Products: Carbon, Alloy, Stainless Steel, and Aluminum
- Revenue: ▲$3.6 billion USD (2023)
- Number of employees: 4,000 (2023)
- Subsidiaries: O'Neal Steel; TW Metals; Lecco Steel; United Performance Metals
- Website: onealind.com

O'Neal Industries, Inc. is a metals service center company headquartered in Birmingham, Alabama. The company was founded in 1921 and operates 90 facilities across the United States, Canada, Mexico, Europe, and Asia, supplying aluminium, alloy, hot-rolled, cold-finished, and stainless steel products to job shops, OEM, heavy industry, and aerospace customers. Forbes listed O'Neal Industries as the 171st largest private company in the United States in its 2024 list of America's Top Private Companies.

== History ==
O'Neal Industries traces back to 1921 when Kirkman O'Neal founded Southern Steel Works as a steel fabricating company in Birmingham, Alabama. The company was formed during the time when the steel industry dominated Birmingham's burgeoning economy. The company grew steadily over the next decade and in 1935 opened one of the South's first metal service center shops. Southern Steel Works changed its name to O'Neal Steel in 1956 and continued to expand over the following decades by opening or acquiring other service centers around the country in places like Jackson, Dallas, and Pittsburgh. Although the metal service center business was intended to complement its steel fabrication business, the company eventually focused on growing the service center business and closed the fabrication business in 1969. The company significantly expanded in 1997 when it acquired Colorado-based Metalwest, which became its first stand-alone subsidiary.

The company made a series of acquisitions in the early to mid-2000s, beginning with Aerodyne Alloys in 2004. Lecco Steel and TW Metals were acquired in 2005, followed by AIM International and Supply Dynamics in 2006. The acquisition of TW Metals was especially significant as it marked O'Neal's entry into the European and Asia markets. The company continued to expand over the next several years through smaller acquisitions, and in 2008, it reorganized by creating O'Neal Industries as the parent company to oversee its stand-alone companies. Many service centers already operating under the O'Neal name were merged into the legacy O'Neal Steel business.

== Philanthropy ==
In 2018, the company and its shareholders made a $30 million gift to the University of Alabama at Birmingham (UAB) to support cancer research. The gift was the single largest gift in the university's history. The O'Neal Comprehensive Cancer Center at UAB is named in the company's honor.

== See also ==
- Steel service center
- Birmingham District
