= Sneaky Pete's =

Fast food chain

- Company type: Restaurant
- Industry: fast food
- Founded: 1966
- Headquarters: Birmingham, Alabama
- Key people: Pete Graphos (founder), Frank D'Amico (Current President), Mark Lovell (Director of Operations), Doug McMinn (Operations Manager)
- Products: fast food (including hot dogs, hamburgers, french fries, breakfast)
- Website: sneakypetes.com

Sneaky Pete's is a Birmingham, Alabama-based chain of hot-dog restaurants founded by Pete Graphos in 1966 and sold to the present-owner Frank D'Amico in 1986. Sneaky Pete's corporate offices are located in Vestavia Hills, Alabama. As part of its franchise plan, many Sneaky Pete's stores are located inside gas station convenience stores under the nameplate Sneaky Pete's Express or Sneaky Pete's On-The-Go.. The company has also experimented with a more upscale sit-down style restaurant with a larger menu, dubbed Sneaky Pete's Cafe. Several locations are in the Greater Birmingham area, and other stores are located throughout Alabama.
