= VT Mobile Aerospace Engineering =

ST Engineering - Pensacola Aerospace (PNA)
- Company type: Subsidiary
- Industry: Aerospace
- Founded: 1991
- Headquarters: Pensacola, FL, United States
- Number of locations: 1
- Area served: North America, South America, Europe
- Services: Aircraft engineering, maintenance, and modifications.
- Parent: ST Engineering
- Website: https://www.stengg.com

ST Engineering - Pensacola Aerospace (PNA) provides commercial aircraft maintenance to passenger and cargo aircraft to many of the world's leading airlines. Founded in Mobile, AL in 1991, it is now located within the Pensacola International Airport in Pensacola, FL. The work force includes technical, engineering, and administrative personnel, consisting largely of FAA licensed aircraft mechanics. The company was established in September 1990 by ST Engineering.

In June 2018, ST Engineering opened a facility at the Pensacola International Airport in Pensacola, Florida to complement the operations in Mobile, Alabama.

== Facilities ==
The facility contains two aircraft hangars equipped with eight wide-body and ten narrow-body aircraft bays for aircraft maintenance, repair, and operations (MRO). MRO services are provided for Airbus' A300, A310, A320, A330, A340, and Boeing's B727, B737, B747, B757, B767, B777, and MD-11. The company also provides passenger-to-freighter (PTF) conversions for the B727, B757, and McDonnell Douglas DC-10 and provides avionics upgrades for the MD-80, DC-9, DC-10, and MD-11.

The Pensacola, FL two hangar facility is capable of housing four (4) B777-300ERs, eight (8) B757s, or up to 12 (12) A321s or 737s. Construction on Hangar 3 is currently underway and is expected to be completed in 4Q2026.
