= Smith Custom Amplifiers =

American audio equipment manufacturer

- Founded: 2002
- Headquarters: Montgomery, Alabama, United States
- Key people: Sammy Smith
- Products: Guitar amplifiers, guitars
- Number of employees: ca. 1
- Website: http://www.smithcustomamps.com/

Smith Custom Amplifiers is a guitar amplifier and custom-made guitar manufacturer in the United States. The company was founded by Sammy Smith in 2002.

Amplifiers made by Smith are all handmade, hand-wired, and use vacuum tube technology. Cabinets are made from pine and the chassis from stainless steel. Smith amplifiers are especially popular among Nashville country music players. In an August 2009 test of similar amplifiers, Smith's SC25R was praised for its "outstanding build quality," receiving first place in the "Best Super-Luscious Tone Machine" category.

Sammy Smith also builds guitars, especially Fender Telecaster models. Many of them are equipped with a T B Bender locked vibrato, operated by pushing down on the neck of the guitar (the "bend" is performed by a mechanism connected to the guitar strap knob on the neck side).
