= Corder Drum Company =

American percussion manufacturer

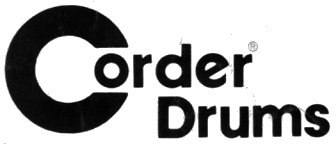
- Industry: Musical instruments
- Founded: 1979
- Founder: Jim Corder
- Defunct: 1990; 36 years ago
- Fate: Acquired by Sammy Darwin
- Headquarters: Huntsville, Alabama, United States
- Products: Drum kits

Corder Drum Company was a percussion instrument manufacturing company based in Huntsville, Alabama. The company was created in 1979 by Jim Corder, following his purchase of the dies, moulds and tooling apparatus of the Fibes Drums Company from its then-owner, the C. F. Martin & Company. Corder Drum manufactured a line of wood shell drums using Fibes-designed lugs, strainers and hoops until 1990, when Corder sold his company to Sammy Darwin, a radio programmer who renamed the operation Darwin Drums. Four years later, Darwin sold the company to Tommy Robertson, who brought back the Fibes Drum Company name for the product line.
