= Auburn Bank =

Bank holding company

- Company type: Public limited company through its holding company
- Traded as: Nasdaq: AUBN; Russell 2000 Index component as its holding company
- Industry: Banking
- Founded: 1907; 119 years ago
- Headquarters: Auburn, Alabama, United States
- Area served: East Alabama
- Key people: E. Spencer (chairman & CEO)
- Services: Deposit; Loans; Debit cards; ATMs
- Revenue: ▲US$ 31.561 million (2017)
- Net income: ▲US$ 7.846 million (2017)
- Total assets: ▲US$ 853.381 million (2017)
- Total equity: ▲US$ 86.906 million (2017)
- Number of employees: 156 (2017)
- Parent: Auburn National Bancorporation Inc.
- Website: www.auburnbank.com

Auburn Bank is an American community bank providing services in the East of Alabama as a state registered bank. The Bank offers financial products and services including checking, savings, and lending. The bank is a member of the Federal Home Loan Bank of Atlanta (the “FHLB”). Its operation is regulated by the Alabama Superintendent of Banks.

The bank is owned by the bank holding company Auburn National Bancorporation Inc.

== History ==
In 1907, Sheldon (Shel) L. Toomer, a successful businessman actively involved with community activities, established Bank of Auburn (now Auburn Bank) with his fellow merchants and faculty friends. The bank was located in the heart of downtown Auburn, which was an educational center in the early twentieth century.

In 1964, the managers decided to change the bank's name to Auburn National Bank.

In 1991, the Bank became a member of the Federal Home Loan Bank of Atlanta (the “FHLB”), and in 1995, they changed the bank's name again to Auburn Bank, which is also the bank's current name.

In 2019, Auburn National Bancorporation, Inc. has stated the selection of Robert W. Dumas as Chairman of the company's board of directors and AuburnBank, its subsidiary. Dumas has been the company's president and chief executive officer since 2001, when he was also appointed director of the company.

== Board of Directors and Officers ==
As of 2020 the board of directors and officers were:

- Terry W. Andrus - Chief Executive Officer (Retired)
- C. Wayne Alderman - Secretary
- J. Tutt Barrett - Attorney
- Lauretta Jenkins Cooper - Executive Director
- Robert W. Dumas - Chairman, President & Chief Executive Officer
