= DeciBel Research =

deciBel Research, Inc
- Company type: Private
- Industry: Defense
- Founded: Huntsville, Alabama (2002)
- Headquarters: Huntsville, Alabama
- Number of employees: 60+ (2008)
- Website: decibelresearch.com

deciBel Research, Inc. is a small high-technology business with emphasis on advancements in radar systems and sensor technologies, currently supporting U.S. Army and Missile Defense Agency customers. Headquartered in Huntsville, Alabama, the staff of deciBel Research, Inc. specializes in the design, development, testing, and applications of advanced radar systems.
