= Golden Flake =

American snack food brand

- Company type: Subsidiary
- Traded as: Nasdaq: GLDC
- Industry: Snack food
- Founded: 1923; 103 years ago
- Founder: Mose Lischkoff and Frank Mosher
- Headquarters: Birmingham, Alabama, United States
- Area served: Alabama, Mississippi, Georgia, Florida, Tennessee, Arkansas, Louisiana, South Carolina, Kentucky, Texas, Oklahoma, Missouri, Virginia, North Carolina, Indiana, Maryland
- Key people: Mark W. McCutcheon (chairman of the board); Paul R. Bates (EVP); David A. Jones (EVP); Patty Townsend (CFO)
- Parent: Utz Quality Foods
- Website: www.utzsnacks.com/pages/golden-flake

Golden Flake Snack Foods is a producer of potato chips, tortilla chips, corn chips, cheese curls, fried pork skins, and other snack foods in the Southern United States. It is now part of Utz Quality Foods.

== History ==
The Golden Flake brand (originally known as Magic City Foods) was established in the 1920s by Mose Lischkoff and Frank Mosher in a Birmingham, Alabama, grocery store basement.

In 1956, Sloan Bashinsky Sr bought Magic City Foods from his father and uncle. He changed the name to "Golden Flake" a year later and, in 1958 moved the production facility to its current 5-acre site. In 1963 he oversaw the acquisition of Don's Foods, a Nashville, Tennessee-based snack producer and distributor. In 1968, the company went public, changing its name again to Golden Enterprises, Inc. It is no longer publicly traded today, and was listed in the NASDAQ under the symbol "GLDC".

One of its most famous spokesmen was Paul "Bear" Bryant, the head football coach for the Alabama Crimson Tide. For years, the potato chips, along with Coca-Cola, were marketed with the slogan, "'Great Pair' says 'the Bear'".

On July 19, 2016, Golden Flake announced that it was being acquired by Utz for $12.00 per share in cash, representing a 71% premium over the average 30-day trading price of $7.00.
