= O'Neal Steel =

American metal distributor

O'Neal Steel, LLC
- Company type: Subsidiary
- Industry: Metals Service Center
- Founded: 1921
- Headquarters: Birmingham, Alabama, USA
- Key people: Jodi Parnell, CEO
- Products: Carbon, Alloy, Stainless Steel, and Aluminum
- Number of employees: >600
- Parent: O'Neal Industries
- Website: www.onealsteel.com

O'Neal Steel is a metals service center headquartered in Birmingham, Alabama. As an O'Neal Industries affiliate, it was founded in 1921 and is one of the nation's largest family-owned metal distributors. Today, O'Neal Steel operates 24 facilities across the United States and supplies a wide range of aluminium, alloy, hot-rolled, cold-finished, and stainless steel products.

== History ==
O'Neal Steel’s metal products line includes angles, bars, beams, pipes, plates, and sheets. O’Neal Steel also offers metal processing services such as tube lasering, forming, laser cutting, plasma cutting, shearing, oxy-fuel cutting, and sawing. In 2019, O’Neal Steel launched PRONTO®, a dynamic eCommerce platform.

== See also ==
- Birmingham District
