= Mercedes-Benz U.S. International =

Mercedes' Alabama car factory

Mercedes Benz U.S. International, Inc.
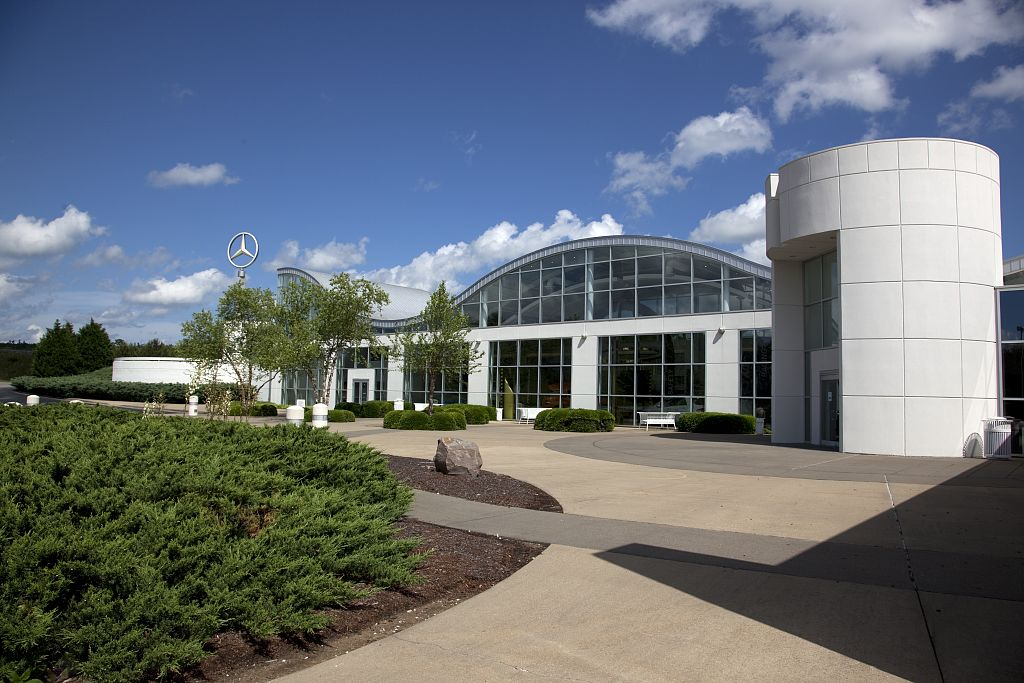
- Front entrance to the Mercedes-Benz visitor and training center in 2010
- Operated: 1997–present
- Location: Vance, Alabama, United States
- Coordinates: 33.181111°N 87.256667°W
- Products: Automobiles, SUVs
- Employees: 6,000 (2021)
- Website: mbusi.com

Mercedes-Benz U.S. International (MBUSI) is a Mercedes-Benz automobile manufacturing plant near Vance, Alabama. It is located about 34 miles (55 km) west of Birmingham and about 19 miles (31 km) east of downtown Tuscaloosa. The factory was announced in 1993 and produced its first vehicle, an ML320, in February 1997.

From its inception to 1999, the president and CEO of MBUSI was Andreas Renschler. When he was promoted to Head of Global Executive Management Development for DaimlerChrysler, he was succeeded by Bill Taylor. Since Taylor's resignation in 2009, the company has been led by Ola Kaellenius (2009–2010), Markus Schaefer (2010–2013), Jason Hoff (2013–2019), Michael Göbel (2019–2024), and Federico Kochlowski (2024–present).

Daimler announced in December 2009 that it would move production of the Mercedes-Benz C-Class to its Vance plant, with production beginning in 2014.

The plant is located on 1,000 acres of land donated by the state of Alabama. The land was donated as part of the bid, by Alabama, to win the contract with Mercedes. The plant includes multiple test tracks, on road and off-road.

== Mercedes-Benz Visitor Center ==
Located on the property is the Mercedes-Benz Visitor Center which includes a museum showcasing cars throughout Mercedes-Benz history. Cars within this collection are rotated out as needed. As of November 2014 there was a Formula One car originally driven by Michael Schumacher located inside. Guests can reserve ahead for plant tours. Admission to the visitor center is free. Plant tours are $5.

== Current vehicles manufactured ==
- Mercedes-Benz GLE - V167 (2016–present)
  - Mercedes-Benz GLE Coupe - C167 (2016–present)
- Mercedes-Benz GLS - X167 (2016–present)
  - Mercedes-Maybach GLS - Z167 (2020–present)
- Mercedes-Benz EQE SUV - X294 (2022–present)
- Mercedes-Benz EQS SUV - X296 (2022–present)
  - Mercedes-Maybach EQS SUV - Z296 (2023–present)

== Former vehicles manufactured ==
- Mercedes-Benz C-Class (2015–2020)
- Mercedes-Benz GL-Class (2007–2015)
- Mercedes-Benz M-Class (1998–2015)
- Mercedes-Benz R-Class (2006–2015)

== Future vehicles manufactured ==
- Mercedes-Benz GLC (2027 planned)

== Labor relations ==
In March 2024, workers at the Mercedes-Benz plant in Vance, Alabama filed charges with the National Labor Relations Board (NLRB), accusing the company of illegally disciplining workers at the plant in retaliation for organizing with the United Auto Workers (UAW) labor union.

In May 2024, following the loss of a unionization vote at the plant, the UAW filed a formal complaint with the NLRB seeking a new election due to what it called "wanton lawlessness" on the part of Mercedes-Benz in the run up to the election, with the UAW accusing the company of holding anti-union captive audience meetings, targeting pro-union workers for drug tests, and illegally terminating UAW supporters.

== See also ==
- Germans in Alabama
