= Hunt Refining Company =

Asphalt refining company founded by H. L. Hunt in 1946

Hunt Refining Co. was founded by American oilman H.L. Hunt as an asphalt refining company in 1946. Today it owns and operates a 52,000-barrel-per-day (8,300 m^{3}/d) petroleum refinery in Tuscaloosa, Alabama. The plant also includes a 16,000-barrel-per-day (2,500 m^{3}/d) coker and a 15,000-barrel-per-day (2,400 m^{3}/d) diesel hydrotreater. In 2006, they announced plans for a $500 million expansion to the refinery.

John A. Matson, who was president of Hunt Refining since 1992, announced in 2010 that he would be retiring at the end of the year. Shanmuk Sharma was selected to replace Matson, and became the president of Hunt Refining Co. in April 2010. Sharma joined Hunt Refining Co. from the Peru LNG/COLP(Compania Operadora de LNG del Peru SAC, a subsidiary of Hunt Oil Co.) project. Sharma had been the project manager on the joint venture to deliver natural gas from the rainforest of Peru to the new LNG plant on the West coast of Peru.

Environmentalists have cited Hunt Refining for receiving and processing crude oil from the Amazon rainforest.
