= Express Oil Change & Tire Engineers =

American automotive maintenance brand

Coordinates: 33.346872°N 86.794376°W

Express Oil Change, LLC
- Logo (2014-present)
- Formerly: Express Oil Change & Service Center (1979-2013)
- Type: Private
- Industry: Automotive service Automotive repair Tire repair
- Founded: 1979; 47 years ago Birmingham, Alabama, U.S.
- Founder: Jim Lunceford
- Headquarters: Birmingham, Alabama, U.S.
- Number of locations: 322 stores in 19 states (2022: 264 corporate, 58 franchise)
- Area served: United States
- Key people: Richard Brooks (CEO); Jim Durkin (President)
- Revenue: US$328 million (2021)
- Owner: BayPine; TSG Consumer Partners; Golden Gate Capital
- Subsidiaries: Brakes Plus
- Website: www.expressoil.com

Express Oil Change & Tire Engineers is an American automotive maintenance brand, with services including its signature 10 minute oil change, in addition to full-service mechanical, tires, brakes, and more general service offerings. The company is headquartered in Birmingham, AL, where it was founded in 1979.

== History ==
In 1979, Express Oil Change was founded by Jim Lunceford, opening the first store in Birmingham, AL. By 1984, Lunceford had opened a total of four locations before deciding to franchise the company.

In 1996, Ricky Brooks and Joe Watson, who were the largest franchisees at the time with 14 locations, were approached by Lunceford to see if the two would be interested in buying the business. They agreed, and immediately had ownership of 25 of the 48 stores in the chain.

=== Continued Growth & Private-Equity ===
In 1998, Express Oil Change purchased Tune-Up Clinics – a 28-store chain based in Atlanta, GA, with 25 of the locations immediately being rebranded to Express Oil Change.

In 2005, Carousel Capital, a private investment firm based in Charlotte, NC, purchased the majority stake in Express Oil Change, while Brooks and Watson remained as CEO and COO. By this time, Express Oil Change and its franchisees operated 149 centers across Alabama, Georgia, Tennessee, Mississippi, Florida and South Carolina.

In 2010, Carousel sold its stake in the company to Thompson Street Capital Partners of St. Louis, MO. By this time, Express Oil Change operated 172 company- and franchise-owned locations across 10 states.

In 2013, as Express Oil Change had expanded to nearly 200 locations across 13 states, Carousel Capital reacquired the company from Thompson Street. Expresst acquired Birmingham-based Tire Engineers, a company with seven locations.

By February 2014, Express had co-branded 20 of its 88 corporate stores to Express Oil Change & Tire Engineers, with plans to rebrand the remaining locations, and offering the 112 franchise locations the opportunity to rebrand as well. The Tire Engineers stores would not be offered as a franchise model, nor would the stand-alone tire stores be co-branded. The combined company acquired additional tire brands: Savannah Tire, Trax Tires, Upton Tire, Epperly Tire, among others.

In June 2017, Express Oil Change & Tire Engineers, which had become the 10th-largest fast lube chain in the United States, was acquired by San Francisco-based private equity firm Golden Gate Capital. Shortly thereafter, in November 2017, Express acquired Brakes Plus of Denver, CO. The Brakes Plus stores would not be offered as a franchise model, nor be rebranded.

In February 2018, Golden Gate announced a merger of Express Oil Change & Tire Engineers and Brakes Plus with its newly acquired Mavis Discount Tire of Millwood, NY, itself having purchased the Cole Muffler & Brake franchise a decade prior, thus creating one of the largest automotive maintenance providers in the United States, known as Mavis Tire Express Services Corp.

In November 2020, the merging of Town Fair Tire Centers and Mavis Tire Express Services with Town Fair Tire of East Haven, CT was announced; Town Fair was then the 14th-largest independent tire dealer in the US, with 101 locations across six states .
