= Alabama National BanCorporation =

Defunct American bank holding company

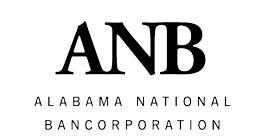
- Industry: Finance and Insurance
- Founded: 1986; 40 years ago
- Defunct: February 25, 2008; 18 years ago
- Fate: Acquired by RBC Bank USA
- Successor: RBC Bank USA (now PNC Bank)
- Headquarters: Birmingham, Alabama
- Key people: John H. Holcomb III (CEO)
- Products: Financial services
- Number of employees: 1,789 (2006)

Alabama National BanCorporation based in Birmingham, Alabama, was a bank holding company which was purchased by RBC Bank USA in 2008 for $1.6 billion. When the deal was announced, it operated 103 banking locations through eleven bank subsidiaries in Alabama, Florida and Georgia, with $7.9 billion in assets as of June 30, 2007.

== History ==
National Bank of Commerce of Birmingham started in 1965 as a family-owned community bank. It was first publicly traded in 1995.

First American Bank of Decatur, Alabama started in 1981. That same year, James A. Taylor bought First National Bank of Ashland. After three more acquisitions, Taylor started a holding company of which he became chairman. By 1993, two more banks and a savings and loan had become part of Alabama National BanCorporation. In 1994, the company added two more banks and $100 million in assets. Later that year, the company received $10 million from its initial public offering. In 1995, National Bank of Commerce, with $130 million more in assets, became a subsidiary of Alabama National after NBC won a deal for a savings and loan. Alabama National also started a bond business after AmSouth closed its bond division.

Alabama National took over First American in 1997, when First American had $223 million in assets and Alabama National had $929 million, ranking sixth in Alabama. Also in 1997, Alabama National entered Florida by opening Citizens & Peoples Bank in Escambia County.

In 1998, Alabama National added two more Florida banks and entered Georgia. The company bought Georgia State Bank of Mableton, with $124 million in assets.

First American Bank bought Rankin Insurance Inc. in 1999.

In 2000, chairman and CEO John H. Holcomb III said, "In the last five years, Alabama National has approximately tripled in size, while continuing to have a very strong performance record."

With the addition of Peoples State Bank of Groveland, Florida in 2001, with $130 million in assets, Alabama National had $2.2 billion in assets and eleven banks which continued to use their own names.

During 2002, insurance subsidiary ABA Insurance Services Inc. bought agencies in Alabama in Florida. The bank holding company had $3.2 billion in assets and 62 branches.

After buying Indian River Banking Company of Vero Beach ($520 million in assets), Cypress Bancshares Inc. ($110 million) of Palm Coast and Millennium Bank of Gainesville ($130 million), Alabama national had $1.4 billion in Florida assets, and $3.9 billion in total assets.

In October 2004, Alabama National announced a deal with National Bank of Commerce which would give First American $2.5 billion in assets and 33 locations. In much of Alabama, the company would operate as First American. First American Bank had 16 locations before the merger, and James "Skip" Thompson III of Decatur, previously First American president and COO, became that bank's new CEO. After the merger, First American's loan operations moved to Birmingham. Also, First Citizens Bank of Talladega became part of First American in May 2005.

In Florida and southern Alabama, First Gulf Bank of Pensacola, Florida and First Gulf Bank of Baldwin County became First Gulf Bank.

In 2005, Alabama National announced that it agreed to buy Florida Choice Bank of Mount Dora, with $325 million in assets, and six locations with plans for two more. The deal gave Alabama National 10 subsidiaries with 85 locations.

In 2008, RBC Bank bought Alabama National for $1.6 billion, adding 45 locations each in Alabama and Florida, and 13 in Georgia. Alabama National had $7.9 billion in assets. The deal became final February 26, 2008. At the time, Alabama National operated these subsidiaries:

Alabama

- First American Bank (Birmingham & Huntsville)
- Alabama Exchange Bank (Tuskegee)
- Bank of Dadeville (Dadeville)

Georgia

- Georgia State Bank (Metro Atlanta)
- The Peachtree Bank (Metro Atlanta)
- Tucker Federal Bank (Metro Atlanta)

Florida

- Admiralty Bancorp (Palm Beach Gardens, FL)
- Indian River National Bank (Vero Beach)
- First Gulf Bank (Escambia County, FL & Baldwin County, AL)
- Florida Choice Bank (Metro Orlando)
- First Community Bank of Naples (Naples)
- Cypress Coquina Bank (Ormond Beach)
- Millennium Bank (Gainesville & Newberry)

On March 4, 2012, all RBC Bank branches became PNC Bank branches, after PNC Financial Services' acquisition of RBC's American assets.
