= Curtiss Motorcycles =

American motorcycle manufacturer

Curtiss Motorcycle Co., Inc.
- Type: Public
- Industry: Motorcycle
- Founded: June 29, 2016
- Founder: H. Matthew Chambers, Jordan Cornille
- Headquarters: Leeds, Alabama, US
- Key people: H. Matthew Chambers (co-founder and CEO), Jordan Cornille (co-founder and designer), JT Nesbitt (lead designer)
- Products: The One
- Revenue: Pre-revenue
- Website: curtissmotorcycles.com

Curtiss Motorcycles, previously Confederate Motors, is an American manufacturer of exotic street motorcycles in Birmingham, Alabama. It was founded in 1991 by trial lawyer H. Matthew Chambers, as an initiative seeking "enlightened design through true American inspiration." In 2017 the company announced plans to rename itself to Curtiss Motorcycles and switch to all-electric motorcycles with a partnership with Zero Motorcycles. The Warhawk will be the final and only gasoline motorcycle under the Curtiss brand. It is based on their P-40 Warhawk Fighter, with a limited run of 35 bikes. On March 29, 2018, Combat Motors LLC purchased the intellectual property rights for the Confederate brand and designs and continues to make gasoline motorcycles.

== History ==
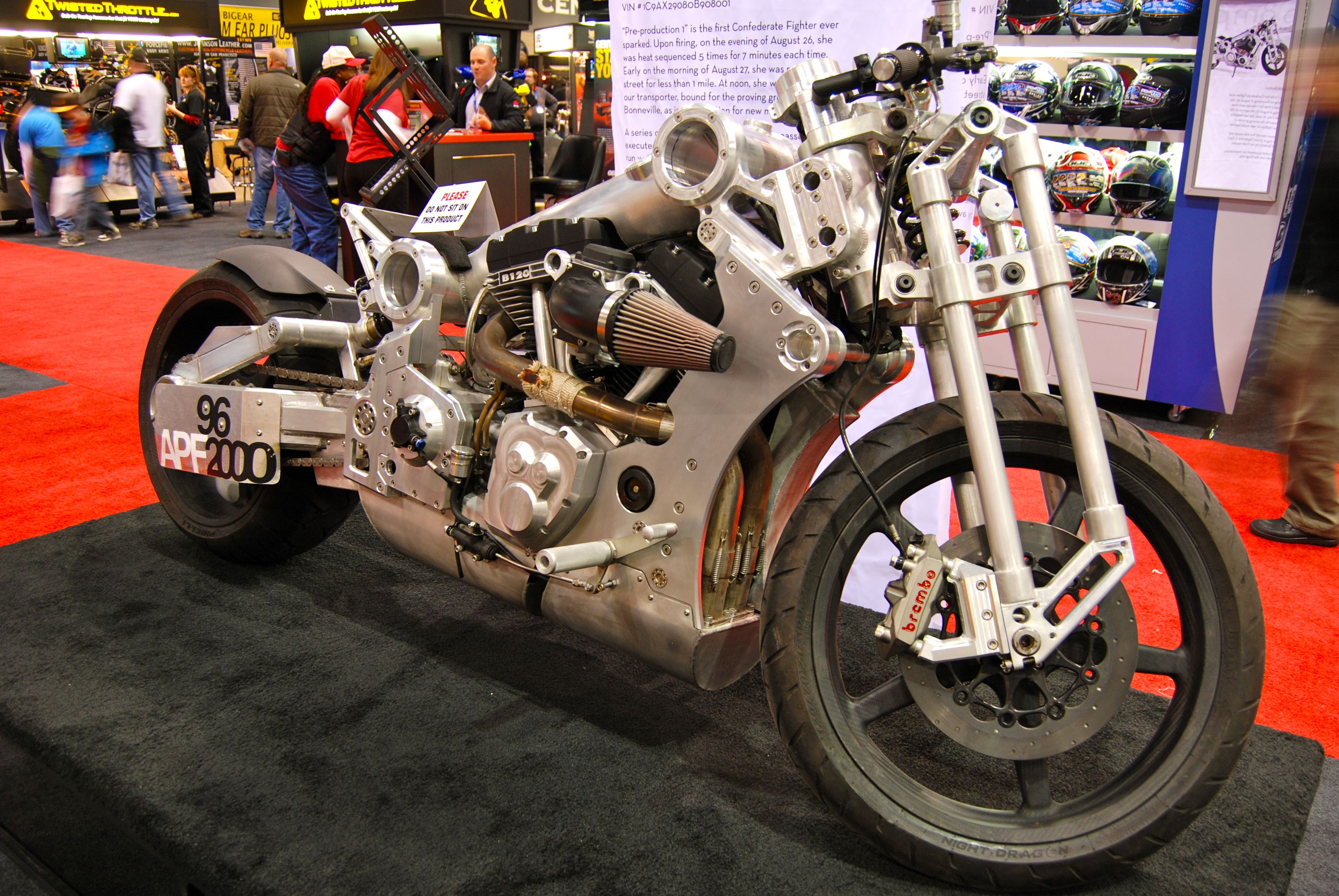
Pre-production 1 is the first Confederate Fighter. Claimed average speed of 155.8 mph (250.7 km/h) in the flying mile at Bonneville Speedway.

The company opened in Baton Rouge, Louisiana in 1991, and after a brief move to San Francisco, California, the next year, moved to a prototype shop in New Orleans, Louisiana, in 1993. The company's first motorcycle rolled off the production line there on November 11, 1994. Over 500 first generation Hellcat models were built from 1996 to 2001. After going bankrupt in 2001, Confederate recovered in 2003 and produced a second generation of Hellcats, about 75 total.

After the severe factory damage in August 2005 by Hurricane Katrina interrupted production, Confederate moved its corporate headquarters and assembly operations to a building in downtown Birmingham, Alabama. Production resumed after the reorganization and move in early 2006, with an announcement in May of their $5 million expansion plans for production of a third, more affordable, model

Confederate Motor Co. sold 37 bikes in 2008 and anticipated the sale of 30 bikes in 2009, due to the recession. Even though Confederate's buyers are too rich to be affected by the economic downturn, company founder Matt Chambers said during the recession, "it was very fashionable to not be buying a high-end luxury product like ours."

In 2013 the company moved to a larger facility in Birmingham. Confederate produced 130 G3 Hellcats. Confederate has launched a G2 Fighter and has plans to launch a G2 Wraith.

At the August 2017 Quail Motorcycle Gathering, Confederate's President Matt Chambers said the Confederate name would be changed to Curtiss, and the company would switch to electric motorcycles in partnership with established electric bike maker Zero Motorcycles. The new model is to be a high-powered cruiser called the Hercules, made in Zero's California facility, not the Birmingham, Alabama Confederate Motorcycle factory. Chambers said that the Civil War connotations of the Confederate name had cost the company business, and they "missed out on branding opportunities" because of it. The Curtiss Motorcycles name is a reference to aviation and motorcycle pioneer Glenn Curtiss. Chambers had defended the Confederate name and motto, "Art of Rebellion", as recently as June 2017, saying "the rebellion we're talking about is cerebral and spiritual and inside of you", connected with the ideas of Albert Camus or E. E. Cummings, and Southern principles Chambers is proud of, not their "unprincipled application", adding that he is "glad the South lost" the Civil War.

== Motorcycles ==
Confederate produced the G1 Hellcat from 1999 - 2001. The G2 Hellcat was produced from 2002 to 2007. The Wraith was produced was 2007 to 2009 and the Fighter from 2009 to 2011. The G3 Hellcat was produced until being sold out in the fourth quarter of 2015.

In 2007, the $92,000 B120 Wraith and F131 Hellcat took first and second place respectively in the AMD World Championship of Custom Bike Building show at the Sturgis Motorcycle Rally, in the production manufacturer category.

In late 2015, entered production of the G2 P51 Combat Fighter, this models frame is produced from a solid billet block of aluminum, creating an aluminum monocoque frame, of which 61 examples will be made, selling for $119,500. Confederate has plans to launch a G2 Wraith and a G3 Hellcat.

In August 2017 Confederate announced a limited edition FA-13 Combat Bomber model based on the G2 P51 Combat Fighter. This models 2,163 cc (132.0 cu in) 56-degree air cooled V-twin engine has claimed specifications of 145 hp (108 kW) @ 5,100 rpm and 160 lb⋅ft (220 N⋅m) @ 2,000 rpm and a wet weight of 560 lb (250 kg), with a top speed of 160 mph (260 km/h)

In 2018, the Warhawk model based on their P51 Fighter will be the last and final gas-powered motorcycle, only 35 bikes will be produced.

=== Current models ===
- The 1

== See also ==
- Harley-Davidson Confederate Edition - A model range by Harley-Davidson which gained similar controversy for its use of Confederate imagery
