= Blue Cross and Blue Shield of Alabama =

American nonprofit health insurance company

- Type: Non-Profit, Private company
- Industry: Insurance
- Founded: 1936
- Headquarters: Birmingham, Alabama, USA
- Key people: Tim Vines, president and chief executive officer Noel Carden, chief financial officer Rebekah Elgin Council, chief marketing officer
- Products: Health Insurance
- Revenue: ▲$4.1 billion USD (2011)
- Number of employees: 5,000 (2020)
- Website: http://www.alabamablue.com/

Blue Cross and Blue Shield of Alabama (BCBSAL) is a nonprofit health insurance company headquartered in Birmingham, Alabama. The company was founded in 1936, provides coverage to more than 3 million people and is a member of the Blue Cross and Blue Shield Association (BCBS). BCBSAL employs nearly 5,000 people, which includes almost 3,500 people at its corporate headquarters in Birmingham. The company also operates Cahaba Government Benefit Administrators and Cahaba Safeguard Administrators, both headquartered in Birmingham. It commands over 90 percent of the health insurance market in Alabama.

== Organization ==
BCBSAL is classified as a 501(m) company by the IRS. Under state law it is classified as a "special health-benefit service plan", not an insurance company, although its coverage functions like health insurance. As a special health-benefit service plan the Alabama Department of Insurance does not automatically review BCBSAL rates as long as the rating methodology doesn't change.

BCBSAL owns/operates :

- Alabama Industries Financial Corporation, which owns United Trust Insurance Company.
- Preferred Care Services, which owns PCS LLC.
- Prime Therapeutics, LLC and the Caring Foundation. (See BCBS organizational chart)

=== United Trust Insurance Company ===
In 1986 BCBSAL had acquired a life insurance company named Modern American Life Insurance Company, incorporated in 1964. A lawsuit forced BCBSAL to change life insurance coverage to disability coverage, and the company was renamed to United Trust Insurance Company in 1988. Over the years it came to assume risk associated with BCBSAL long-term care policies, and sold short term disability coverage. By the end of 2012, the company held US$1 million of capital stock and a surplus of US$986 million. As of 2012 United Trust Insurance Company had agreements with multiple other insurance companies like Able Benefit Solutions, BCS (Bishop, Cannon and Stacy) Insurance Company, Companion Life Insurance Company/Medical risk Managers Inc, Glencairn Health and Specialty. It was tasked with marketing stop and excess-loss reinsurance products. It was deemed an 18 U.S.C.§ 1033 insurer, but 1033 did not apply, because it had no employees.

=== Cahaba Government Benefit Administrators, LLC ===
Cahaba Government Benefit Administrators (GBA), headquartered in Birmingham, has been a financial intermediary with the Centers for Medicare & Medicaid Services (CMS) administering Alabama Medicare fee-for-service claims. Prior to Medicare contracting reform in 2005, CMS awarded Cahaba a no bid contract. In January 2009, Cahaba won a US$335 million 5-year contract with the CMS to administer Medicare insurance in 3 more states besides Alabama, Georgia, Tennessee and in Mississippi for part B Medicare./ The contract's full name is 'Jurisdiction 10 (J10) A/B Medicare Administrative Contract'. Cahaba also provides Regional Home Health Intermediary coverage for numerous states across the country.

=== Cahaba Safeguard Administrators, LLC ===
Cahaba Safeguard Administrators, headquartered in Birmingham, was founded in 2002 to administer Medicare fraud prevention and is one of 12 contractors under the Centers for Medicare & Medicaid Services.

=== Leadership compensation ===
Former CEO Terry D. Kellogg's total compensation for 2013 was $4.84 million, including a salary of $999,959, bonuses of $3,580,651 and other compensation of $257,227, representing a raise of 95.5% since 2011. The company is considered by many employees to be one of the best places to work in the Birmingham metropolitan area, taking into account pay and other factors. The corporate culture also ranks high among reviewers.

== History ==
BCBSAL was founded in 1936 as the Hospital Service Corporation. In 1952, the company changed its name to Blue Cross-Blue Shield of Alabama. In 1970, the name was changed back to Blue Cross and Blue Shield of Alabama L. By that year, it had increased its enrollment to over 1 million people. By 1994, the company increased enrollment to 2 million members statewide and by 2016, it increased to over 3 million nationwide. Even though other companies are available, over 90% of the Alabama market continues to choose BCBSAL Enrollment is again expected to grow in 2017, considering all other companies in Alabama have abandoned the Health Insurance Marketplace (Obamacare) Exchange.

At the end of 2011, BCBSAL assets had totaled $2.4 billion, according to the Alabama Department of Insurance records. It had a revenue of $4.1 billion and a net income of $257 million in 2011, a 58 percent gain from 2010. Yet, still the 2010 U.S. Department of Health and Human Services survey found BCBSAL offered the second-most affordable employer-sponsored family health plans in the country; and more than 90 cents of every dollar in premiums is returned to members in the form of benefits.

As of 2012, BCBSAL had amassed a surplus of $991 million, which the insurance industry calls "unassigned funds". These savings, which amount to about 3.3 months of typical claims expenses - or one basic emergency room visit per member, are insurance against fluctuations in short-term conditions that could affect the company's ability to pay claims. It makes BCBSAL self-insured since the company is not a beneficiary of the Alabama insurance guaranty funds. It provides financial stability and self-reliance for the company, and therefore the members, with regard to claims.

(The Alabama insurance guaranty fund is an emergency reserve pool maintained by periodic levies on all insurance companies to create a cash fund to pay the obligations of struggling insurers, similar to FDIC for banks.)

As of 2018 Tim Vines is the CEO and President of Blue Cross Blue Shield of Alabama, moving up from Vice President and COO.

== Honors ==
- JD Power and Associates Member Satisfaction - 2009–2014, 2016, 2020
- Blue Cross Blue Shield Brand Excellence Award - 21 years running
- Four stars for Medicare Advantage Plan - 2020
- National Business Group on Health - Best Employers for Healthy Lifestyles 2013-2015
- American Heart Association as a Fit-Friendly Company - 2012, 2015

== Lawsuits ==
In 1998, Sanderson et al vs. Blue Cross and Blue Shield of Alabama was resolved by BCBSAL establishing new capital benchmark guidelines for its "unassigned funds" and adjusting benefit rates by US$208 million minus legal fees over 3 years ("prospective rate adjustment program").

BCBSAL was sued seven times in 2012 on anti-trust grounds for conspiring with others to avoid competition in U.S. District Court in Birmingham.

In 2020, Blue Cross Blue Shield insurers in six states have sued CVS Health Corp. over an alleged conspiracy to overburden them with generic medications by filing premium requests at "inflated rates."
