= BE&K =

BE&K, Inc.
- Industry: Engineering and construction
- Founded: 1972
- Defunct: 2008
- Fate: Acquired by KBR
- Products: Engineering, Procurement, and Construction (EPC)

BE&K, Inc., was a global engineering and construction company based in Birmingham, Alabama, United States.

== History ==
BE&K, Inc. was founded in 1972 and named after its founders: Peter Bolvig, William Edmonds, and Ted Kennedy. BE&K was acquired by KBR, Inc. in 2008.

== Operations ==
BE&K, Inc. operated in commercial and industrial sectors, including healthcare, telecommunications and education markets. BE&K, Inc. had a presence across the United States and in Europe through its subsidiaries. Its subsidiaries and affiliates included Allstates Technical Services, Inc.; Enprima; MEI Consultants, Inc.; NorthStar Communications Group, Inc.; QBEK; Rintekno Group; BE&K's Saginaw Warehouse; SW&B Construction Corporation; and Terranext, LLC.

In 1989, BE&K acquired FN Thompson Company, a Charlotte, North Carolina–based commercial construction firm. Seven years later, in 1996, BE&K acquired Suitt Construction Company, based in Greenville, South Carolina. In 2004, FN Thompson and Suitt Construction were merged into a separate subsidiary, BE&K Building Group, LLC, under the BE&K brand.

In 2007, BE&K was ranked 47th in the Engineering News-Record (ENR) Top 500 Design Firms list, as well as appearing in several other rankings by ENR.

== Acquisition ==
On May 7, 2008, BE&K, Inc. announced that it would be acquired by the Houston, Texas–based construction firm KBR, Inc. for $550 million.

In 2015, KBR sold the BE&K Building Group LLC subsidiary and the BE&K brand, including all associated trademarks and domains, to Pernix Group, Inc. The BE&K brand is now wholly owned by Pernix Group and solely used by BE&K Building Group, LLC. The remainder of BE&K's business and associated subsidiaries have either been fully absorbed by KBR or divested to other purchasers with all operations in Birmingham, Alabama discontinued.
