= ProAssurance =

Property and casualty insurance company

ProAssurance Corporation
- Type: Subsidiary
- Traded as: NYSE: PRA
- Industry: Property & Casualty Insurance
- Founded: 1976
- Headquarters: Birmingham, Alabama USA
- Key people: Edward L. Rand, Jr., Chief Executive Officer; Dana S. Hendricks, Chief Financial Officer
- Products: Insurance
- Revenue: ▼$874 million USD (2020)
- Number of employees: 970 (2017)
- Parent: The Doctors Company
- Website: proassurance.com

ProAssurance Corporation, headquartered in Birmingham, Alabama, is a property and casualty company that sells professional liability insurance to doctors. The company was founded in 1976 as Mutual Assurance and was later renamed to Medical Assurance in 1997. The name "ProAssurance" was created in 2001 when Medical Assurance merged with Professionals Group. The company is currently the fourth largest medical professional liability insurance writer and has over $6 billion in assets.

On June 26, 2026, The Doctors Company completed the purchase of ProAssurance for $25 per share in cash, for a total value of about $1.3 billion.

== History ==
=== Growth and Acquisitions ===
On November 7, 2005, the company sold its personal lines insurance operations, known as Meemic Insurance Company, to Ally Financial (GMAC) for $400 million. Of the $400 million, $327 million was to be paid in cash, and $73 million was to be in capital that was held in Meemic Insurance Company. The sale was completed on January 4, 2006.

The company operates five principal subsidiaries: ProAssurance Indemnity Company (formerly The Medical Assurance Company), ProAssurance Casualty Company (formerly ProNational Insurance Company), ProAssurance Wisconsin Insurance Company (formerly PIC Wisconsin), ProAssurance Specialty Insurance Company (formerly Red Mountain Casualty Insurance Company), and ProAssurance National Capital Insurance Company (formerly NCRIC, Inc.).

On April 1, 2009, ProAssurance acquired Podiatry Insurance Company of America, A Mutual Company (PICA) in a sponsored demutualization. PICA, founded by podiatrists in 1980, is the largest insurer of podiatrists in the U.S. PICA also is an insurer of U.S. chiropractors and acupuncturists through its subsidiary, PACO Assurance Company, Inc. (PACO). PICA had previously acquired PACO (1999), Dependable Protective Mutual (2000), and OUM (2001). PICA is domiciled in Illinois and its offices are in Brentwood, Tennessee.

In 2010, ProAssurance acquires American Physicians Service Group, Inc., the publicly traded parent company of American Physicians Insurance Company (API), an Austin, Texas-based insurer with roots stretching back to 1975. This transaction expands ProAssurance's presence into Texas and expands writings in Arkansas and Oklahoma. ProAssurance and Ascension Health, the nation's largest not-for-profit healthcare provider, announce the creation of the Certitude program. This partnership provides a medical professional liability program for certain on-staff and affiliated physicians and mid-level healthcare providers.

ProAssurance acquires Independent Nevada Doctors Insurance Exchange (IND), a Nevada reciprocal insurer in 2012. This expanded ProAssurance's presence in the Nevada healthcare professional liability market and the western United States.

In 2013, ProAssurance acquires Medmarc Insurance Group in a sponsored demutualization. The Medmarc Group, consisting of Medmarc Casualty Insurance Company and Noetic Specialty Insurance Company, expands ProAssurance's healthcare-centric focus to medical products and life sciences, and lawyer writings.

On January 1, 2014 ProAssurance acquires Eastern Insurance Holdings, Inc., a publicly traded healthcare-centric writer of worker's compensation insurance. ProAssurance becomes the majority capital provider to Syndicate 1729 at Lloyd's of London. Also, in 2014 ProAssurance announces the formation of CAPAssurance in partnership with the Cooperative of American Physicians (CAP), a California-based insurer.

In 2015, ProAssurance formed ProAssurance American Mutual, a Risk Retention Group domiciled in Washington, D.C. The Risk Retention Group division provides malpractice insurance coverage options for healthcare providers of all sizes and types.

In 2017, ProAssurance's subsidiary, Eastern Alliance, purchased Great Falls Insurance Company's book of workers' compensation business. This purchase allowed Eastern to expand operations into Maine and New Hampshire. In September 2017, ProAssurance Corporation endowed the University of Alabama School of Medicine $1.5 million to establish the ProAssurance Endowed Chair for Physician Wellness. The chair will support a research team to address health issues unique to physicians."

On May 5, 2021, ProAssurance Corporation acquires NORCAL Mutual, a physician-directed insurance company based in Northern California. As leaders in writing medical professional liability insurance, NORCAL contributions help to expand ProAssurance's nationwide operations.
