= Hoar Construction =

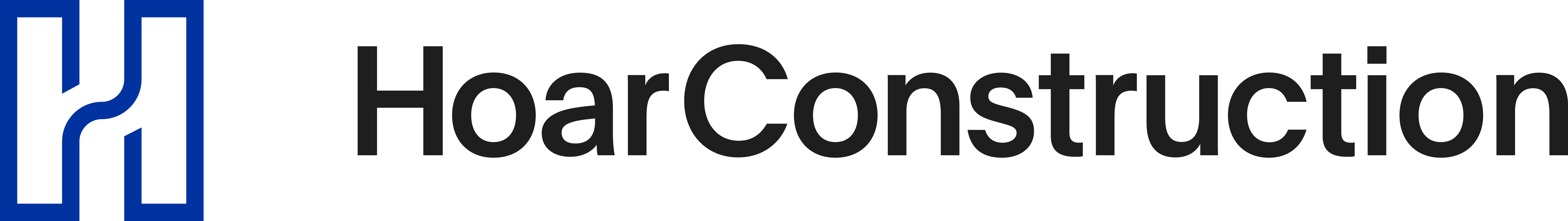
- Company type: Private
- Industry: Construction
- Founded: Birmingham, Alabama U.S. (1940)
- Founder: F.R. Hoar
- Headquarters: Birmingham, Alabama, U.S.
- Key people: Rob Burton, CEO; Jeremy DiPiazza, CFO Doug Eckert, EVP; Randall Curtis, COO; Turner Burton, President
- Services: General construction Construction management Design / Build
- Revenue: ▲US$$1 billion (2018)
- Website: Hoar Construction Website

Hoar Construction is a privately held construction company specializing in commercial, industrial, health care, government, cultural/entertainment, education, residential, hospitality, and retail/mixed use construction. Founded in 1940 by Friend Reed (F.R.) Hoar and headquartered in Birmingham, Alabama, the company is currently ranked as one of the top 200 contractors in the United States. In addition to its Birmingham headquarters, Hoar also has offices in Orlando, Tampa, Nashville, Chattanooga, Houston, Austin, Dallas, DC, and Atlanta.

== History ==
The company initially specialized in the construction of churches throughout the Birmingham area. Richard Hoar joined his father's construction business in 1947, and F.R. Hoar and Son was established.

After completing construction on 45 churches, F.R. Hoar and Son expanded its focus to include retail, commercial, and industrial projects. The company renamed itself Hoar Construction in 1985.

In 2008, it was named the fifth best place to work in America.

With US$866 million in revenue for 2018, Hoar Construction was ranked 10th among Birmingham's largest privately held companies. In August 2018, Turner Burton was promoted to president of the company. At the same time, Randall Curtis was announced as chief operating officer and Will Watson was named vice president of the Alabama division to replace Burton. In December 2018, Hoar Construction was named the Company of the Year in Construction Dive's annual Dive Awards.

== Major projects ==
Some of Hoar’s recent notable projects include:

- Abilene Christian University, Abilene, Texas
- Avalon 8000, Alpharetta, Ga.
- Broadwest, Nashville, Tenn.
- Capitol View, Nashville, Tenn.
- Children’s of Alabama, Birmingham, Ala., onsite since 2009
- Colony Square, Atlanta, Ga.
- Dania Pointe, Dania Beach, Fla.
- Elysium 14, Washington, D.C.
- Encompass Health, multiple projects since 1996
- GD Copper USA, Pine Hill, Ala.
- Historic Federal Reserve, Birmingham, Ala.
- Hotel Indigo Gainesville-Celebration Pointe, Gainesville, Fla.
- Inspire on 22nd, Austin, Texas
- Latitude Med Center, Houston, Texas
- Poff Federal Building, Roanoke, Va.
- Studer Family Children's Hospital, Pensacola, Fla.
- Talladega Superspeedway, Talladega, Ala.
- Texas A&M University Building for Academic and Student Services, Texarkana, Texas
- Toyota Field, Madison, Ala.
- University of Tennessee at Chattanooga West Campus Housing, Chattanooga, Tenn.
- Vireo, Atlanta, Ga.
- X Houston, Houston, Texas

== Awards ==
- Dive Awards 2018 Company of the Year — Construction Dive
