= Encompass Health =

American health care company

Encompass Health Corporation
- Formerly: HealthSouth Corporation
- Type: Public company
- Traded as: NYSE: EHC; S&P 400 component
- Industry: Healthcare
- Founded: 1984; 42 years ago
- Founder: Richard M. Scrushy
- Headquarters: Birmingham, Alabama, U.S.
- Key people: Greg Carmichael (chairman); Mark Tarr (president & CEO); Douglas E. Coltharp (CFO)
- Products: Rehabilitation
- Revenue: ▲US$5.935 billion (2025)
- Net income: ▲US$566 million (2025)
- Number of employees: 40,200 (2025)
- Website: encompasshealth.com

Encompass Health Corporation, formerly Amcare and HealthSouth, based in Birmingham, Alabama, is the United States's largest provider of inpatient rehabilitative services, offering facility-based care through its network of 173 inpatient rehabilitation hospitals located in 39 states and Puerto Rico. Encompass Health's hospitals focus on providing rehabilitative treatment and care to patients who are recovering from stroke and other neurological disorders, cardiac and pulmonary conditions, brain and spinal cord injuries, complex orthopedic conditions and amputations. The company operated a home health and hospice business that was spun off as Enhabit in 2022.

From 1996 to 2003, executives at the company committed accounting fraud on a large scale, leading to a scandal and financial restructuring.

== History ==
=== Early years ===
Encompass Health was incorporated as Amcare, Inc. on February 22, 1984 in Birmingham, Alabama by Richard M. Scrushy and four co-founders as a provider of outpatient rehabilitation services. Scrushy developed the idea for the company in 1983 while working at Lifemark Corporation, a publicly traded hospital company that was in the process of being acquired by a competitor. Scrushy, a Lifemark vice president, recognized the need for physical therapy services were increasing at the same time hospitals were looking to cut costs and that it would be more cost-effective to offer those services in an outpatient setting.

Scrushy and the four co-founders invested $50,000 to start the company, with Scrushy contributing the largest amount at $25,000, and Citicorp Venture Capital providing an additional $1 million in funding. Scrushy took on the role of chairman and CEO, which he would hold until 2003, while the four co-founders took on administrative roles. The company opened its first outpatient facility in Little Rock, Arkansas in early 1984 followed by a second facility in Birmingham later that year.

The company changed its name to HealthSouth Rehabilitation Corporation in 1985 to distinguish itself from other healthcare companies in the market and purchased its first inpatient rehabilitation hospital in early 1986. This was followed by an initial public offering (IPO) on the Nasdaq later that year in August. At the end of Scrushy's speech at the last investor roadshow presentation in New York City before HealthSouth's IPO, the traditionally stoic investment bankers gave Scrushy a standing ovation. One banker in attendance told Aaron Beam, co-founder and then CFO, that he had never seen a reaction like that before and attributed it to Scrushy's remarkable ability to sell the concept behind HealthSouth.

The company moved its listing to the New York Stock Exchange in 1989 and purchased the 219-bed South Highlands Hospital on Birmingham's Southside. The purchase was significant for the company as it marked HealthSouth's entrance into acute care hospitals that focused on orthopedics and launched HealthSouth as a recognizable name in sports medicine. South Highlands Hospital, which was renamed HealthSouth Medical Center, was affiliated with the Alabama Sports Medicine and Orthopaedic Center and its world-renowned orthopedic surgeons Dr. James Andrews and Dr. Larry Lemak, as well as the American Sports Medicine Institute. The success of this venture led HealthSouth to later develop partnerships with many of the nation's other top orthopedic surgeons and clinics, including Dr. Frank Jobe at Kerlan-Jobe Orthopaedic Clinic in Los Angeles, California.

=== Growth ===
The company grew steadily during its first few years by opening new facilities and making small acquisitions. It had 50 facilities across the United States by 1990 and $400 million in annual revenue by 1992. The company made its first large acquisition in late 1993 when it acquired 28 inpatient rehabilitation hospitals and 45 outpatient rehabilitation facilities from National Medical Enterprise. The acquisition double the size of the company and made HealthSouth the nation's largest provider of inpatient and outpatient rehabilitation. HealthSouth grew its inpatient business further when it acquired ReLife the following year.

HealthSouth expanded rapidly through acquisitions during the mid-to-late 1990s and changed its name again, dropping "Rehabilitation" in 1994, becoming HealthSouth Corporation. That same year it entered the diagnostic imaging business with the purchase of Diagnostic Health Corporation. HealthSouth entered the ambulatory surgery center business in early 1995 with the purchase of Surgical Health Corporation. One month later the company announced the purchase of NovaCare's rehabilitation hospital business. After additional surgery center acquisitions during 1995, including the $1.2 billion acquisition of Surgical Care Affiliates, HealthSouth became the nation's largest provider of outpatient surgery. HealthSouth rounded out the year by purchasing Caremark Orthopedic Services from Caremark International and announcing the acquisition of Advantage Health Corp. ReadiCare and Health Images were acquired in 1996 to strengthen HealthSouth's occupational health and diagnostic imaging businesses, respectively.

The "H" logo first appeared in 1996 but was phased out beginning in 2005.

The company's largest acquisition during the 1990s came in February 1997 when HealthSouth announced it would acquire Horizon/CMS Healthcare Corp for $1.8 billion. Horizon/CMS was a large publicly traded healthcare company that primarily focused on outpatient rehabilitation, inpatient rehabilitation hospitals, and long-term care hospitals. A few months after the acquisition closed, HealthSouth sold Horizon/CMS's long-term care assets to Integrated Health Services for $1.15 billion in cash. HealthSouth continued to grow its surgery center division by acquiring ASC Network Corp. in late 1997 and National Surgery Centers along with 34 surgery centers from Columbia/HCA during the summer of 1998.

By 1999, the company, along with most healthcare providers, began experiencing a decline in earnings following the passage of the Balanced Budget Act of 1997. That summer, HealthSouth announced it would split into two separate companies. HealthSouth Corporation would continue to own and operate the outpatient rehabilitation, surgery center, diagnostic imagining, and occupational health businesses while HealthSouth Hospital Corporation would own and operate the inpatient rehabilitation hospitals and the company's four acute care hospitals. The plan was shelved several months later when the company revised its earnings estimates.

HealthSouth had over 2,000 facilities across all 50 states by the end of 1999 and was one of the nation's largest providers of healthcare services. It also had expanded into international markets through its many acquisitions, with facilities in the United Kingdom, Australia, Puerto Rico, Canada, and later Saudi Arabia. The company's dominance as the largest provider in all its lines of business benefited HealthSouth when it came to negotiations with health insurance providers.

Growth through acquisitions slowed by the end of the 1990s as the company had acquired many of its competitors. The company announced the sale of its occupational health business to U.S. HealthWorks in May 2001. Later that year, the company announced it was partnering with Oracle Corporation to build the world's first all-digital acute care hospital. The 13-story structure, known informally as the "Digital Hospital", would be built in Birmingham on 19-acres of land adjacent to HealthSouth's corporate headquarters and serve as a replacement for its Southside medical center. Construction was halted two years later following an accounting scandal at the company.

=== Accounting scandal ===
Following large sales of company stock by Scrushy in May and July 2002, and a surprise announcement of an annual $175 million shortfall in earnings during second quarter's earnings release in August, the U.S. Securities and Exchange Commission launched an investigation into Scrushy and HealthSouth to determine what was known about the shortfall before the sales. On March 19, 2003, the SEC took action against the company regarding fraudulent accounting. Scrushy and other high-ranking executives were accused of directing company employees to report false earnings in order to meet Wall Street's expectations.

The fraud was revealed when two executive officers, fearful the fraud would soon be exposed and of new laws enacted by Sarbanes-Oxley, went to the FBI separately to admit their involvement. SEC investigators had not suspected fraud in their initial investigation. It was later revealed the $175 million earnings shortfall announcement was a cover to unwind a significant portion of the fraud. On November 4, 2003, Scrushy was indicted in the accounting fraud. HealthSouth cooperated with the government in its investigation and was not indicted.

The board of directors acted quickly after the fraud was revealed. The entire executive management team, including Scrushy, was fired or replaced, with directors Joel Gordon and Robert P. May stepping in as interim chairman and interim CEO, respectively. HealthSouth was delisted from the New York Stock Exchange and removed from the S&P 500. The restructuring firm Alvarez & Marsal was brought in, at the advice of JPMorgan Chase, to assist with financial restatements and to work with HealthSouth's lenders. Although there were concerns following the fraud announcement that the company could file for bankruptcy protection, this turned out to be unfounded, and several months later the company announced it had worked out financing agreements with lenders and that all lines of business were producing sufficient cash flow. It was later determined that $2.7 billion in fraud had occurred from 1996 to 2003.

=== Repositioning the company ===
From 2003 until 2006, the company worked to address operational inefficiencies and correct actions that led to fraud. Jay Grinney, president of HCA's Eastern division, was brought in as HealthSouth's new president and CEO in 2004. U.S. Can Corporation executive John Workman was brought in to serve as the company's CFO, and Mike Snow, president of HCA's Gulf Coast division, joined as COO. The company sold or closed underperforming facilities and disposed of corporate waste accrued under Scrushy, including most of the company's fleet of corporate jets.

The company sold its Southside medical center in Birmingham to UAB in early 2006, marking the end of its venture into orthopedic-focused acute care hospitals. The company had previously sold HealthSouth Doctors' Hospital in Coral Gables, Florida to Baptist Health South Florida in late 2003 and closed HealthSouth Metro West Hospital in west Birmingham in late 2005. HealthSouth's medical center in Dallas, Texas was converted to an inpatient rehabilitation hospital in 2005.

On May 15, 2006, the company became current with SEC regulations when it filed its first 10-Q since third quarter 2002. The company unveiled a restructuring plan in August which involved selling, spinning-off or other disposition of its surgery, outpatient, and diagnostic divisions, along with a 1-for-5 reverse stock split to coincide with its relisting on the New York Stock Exchange. The sales would allow the company to focus on growing its inpatient rehabilitation hospital division. The last step in the company's recovery from the accounting scandal occurred in October when HealthSouth was relisted on the New York Stock Exchange.

HealthSouth announced it was selling its outpatient business to Select Medical Corporation in January 2007. Two months later it announced the sale of its surgery center division to private equity firm TPG Capital, retaining a small equity interest in the newly formed company. In April, HealthSouth announced a definitive agreement to sell its diagnostic division to private equity firm The Gores Group. The outpatient business transaction was completed in May. The surgery center and diagnostic imaging transactions closed in June and July with the re-creations of Surgical Care Affiliates and Diagnostic Health Corporation.

In March 2008, HealthSouth closed on the sale of its corporate headquarters campus and "Digital Hospital" in Birmingham to Daniel Corporation, a commercial real estate firm. The deal included the 85-acre corporate headquarters property and the adjacent 19-acre parcel of land containing the incomplete 13-story "Digital Hospital". HealthSouth retained a 40% residual interest in the hospital property and leased back the headquarters' building. The incomplete hospital was eventually sold to Community Health Systems and today is known as Grandview Medical Center.

== Recent years ==
In the seven years that followed the sales of the company's outpatient rehabilitation, surgery center, and diagnostic imaging divisions, the company grew its inpatient business by building new hospitals and acquiring others from hospital systems. In 2014, HealthSouth purchased Encompass Home Health & Hospice to expand its own, but relatively small, home health and hospice operations. The company continued to grow this business with additional acquisitions, including CareSouth in 2015, Camillia Healthcare in 2018, Alacare in 2019, and Frontier Home Health and Hospice in 2021.

HealthSouth purchased Reliant Hospital Partners in 2015 for $730 million. The purchased added 11 inpatient rehabilitation hospitals in Texas, Massachusetts, and Ohio to the company's 109 inpatient rehabilitation hospitals, strengthening the company's position as the largest provider of inpatient rehabilitation.

Jay Grinney retired as president, CEO, and board member at the end of 2016 after 12 years with the company. His tenure is largely credited with the company's successful turnaround following the accounting scandal. Mark Tarr, COO and a longtime HealthSouth employee, stepped into the CEO role in January 2017. One year later the company changed its name to Encompass Health Corporation, combining its inpatient, home health, and hospice operations under one name. The name Encompass Health was chosen as a reflection of the "Encompass" name in its home health and hospice business and the "Health" in HealthSouth. The home health and hospice business was spun off as Enhabit in July 2022.

== Former affiliated companies ==
- Capstone Capital Corporation — A publicly-traded real estate investment trust founded by HealthSouth.
- Diagnostic Health Corporation — Former diagnostic imaging division.
- Enhabit — Former home health and hospice division.
- MedPartners — A publicly traded physician practice management company founded with HealthSouth backing. The company rebranded as Caremark Rx in 2000 and is now a unit of CVS Health.
- SourceMedical Solutions — A clinical automated programing software company founded by HealthSouth.
- Surgical Care Affiliates — Former surgery center division.
