= Home health =

Home health may refer to:

- Home care
- Home health nursing
- House call
