= List of Nagi-Asu: A Lull in the Sea episodes =

Cover of Volume 1 featuring main characters Hikari Sakishima (left) and Manaka Mukaido

This is a list of episodes for Nagi-Asu: A Lull in the Sea, known in Japan as Nagi no Asukara (凪のあすから; lit. From The Calm Tomorrow), a 2013–2014 Japanese anime television series produced by P.A. Works. The series centers on a group of seven friends: Hikari Sakishima, Manaka Mukaido, Chisaki Hiradaira, and Kaname Isaki, children from the sea; and Tsumugu Kihara, Miuna Shiodome, and Sayu Hisanuma, their new friends from the surface.

The anime series is produced by P.A. Works and directed by Toshiya Shinohara. The screenplay is written by Mari Okada and the original character designs are by Buriki. It started airing on October 3, 2013. For episodes 1 to 13, the opening theme is "lull (Soshite Bokura wa)" (lull〜そして僕らは〜) by Ray and the ending theme is "Aqua Terrarium" (アクアテラリウム, Akua Terariumu) by Nagi Yanagi. For episode 14 to 25, the opening and ending themes are "Ebb and Flow" by Ray and "Mitsuba no Musubi me" by Nagi Yanagi respectively. The 26th and final episode has 2 insert songs: "lull ~Earth color of a calm~" and "mnemonic", sung by Ray and Yanagi, respectively. NIS America acquired the home video and streaming rights to the anime.

== Episode list ==
No.	Title	Original air date
1	"In Between the Sea and the Land"; Transliteration: "Umi to Daichi no Mannaka ni" (Japanese: 海と大地のまんなかに)	October 3, 2013
After Nami Junior High School in the sea village Shioshishio closes down, four childhood friends (Hikari Sakishima, Manaka Mukaido, Chisaki Hiradaira and Kaname Isaki) are transferred to attend Mihama Junior High School in the surface town Oshiooshi. Chisaki, Kaname, Hikari and Manaka each introduce themselves to their classmates, who are disgusted by the sea humans. It is explained that there has been a rift between the sea humans and land humans, the former being descendants of a sacrifice maiden to the Sea God, which marked the beginning of a boat drift ceremony called the Ofunehiki. After school, Hikari accompanies Manaka, who brings soup as an offering in exchange for sacred blue fire from Lord Uroko, a messenger of the Sea God. After Lord Uroko smells Manaka's arm full of feminine scent, she dumps the soup on his face and runs away. The next day, Manaka is cursed with a fish head growing out of her right kneecap, and Hikari decides to bandage it up. After class, some classmates take a closer look at Manaka's Ena, skin that allows any sea human to live in the water. Trying to leave the classroom, Manaka bangs her right kneecap onto a desk, causing the fish head hidden underneath the bandage to blow a raspberry. Manaka runs into the forest out of embarrassment and gets lost. Due to being out of the water too long, she collapses and her Ena starts to chip away. While Hikari, Chisaki and Kaname search for Manaka, she is luckily found by a boy named Tsumugu Kihara, who brings her to his house where he lives with his fisherman grandfather Isamu Kihara. Manaka awakens after Tsumugu soaks her with saltwater in the bathtub, restoring her Ena. Although Manaka is embarrassed by the fish head on her right kneecap, Tsumugu thinks that the fish head is pretty and that her Ena is beautiful. In the evening, Hikari encounters Manaka walking with Tsumugu at the seawall. Hikari angrily brings Manaka with him into the sea, noting that Manaka is no longer embarrassed by the fish head since the bandage was removed.
2	"The Chilly Layer"; Transliteration: "Hiyakkoi Usumaku" (Japanese: ひやっこい薄膜)	October 10, 2013
As morning approaches, the entire fish departs from Manaka's right kneecap, thereby lifting the curse. Attempting to instigate another curse, Manaka throws food at Lord Uroko, though he seems to enjoy it. During class, Manaka thanks Tsumugu for helping her, but she pretends that the fish head still exists underneath her bandage. Hikari walks away after lashing out on Manaka for involving herself with Tsumugu. However, Manaka learns from Chisaki that Hikari was worried about her. It is explained that a wooden statue represents the sacrifice maiden Lady Ojoshi to the Sea God during the Ofunehiki. Hikari, Manaka, Chisaki, Kaname and Tsumugu all volunteer to build the wooden statue for the ceremony. Tsumugu confirms his knowledge about Shioshishio, including the existence of Lord Uroko, saltflake snow and sacred blue fire. As Hikari, Manaka, Chisaki and Kaname head back to sea, they spot Hikari's older sister Akari Sakishima kissing a man named Itaru Shiodome, who drops her off at the wharf. The four discuss that a sea human would be banished from Shioshishio if they marry a land human, though each of them voice their concerns for this rule. Visiting a playground outside their old school, Chisaki and Kaname talk about how it would be easier to stay in Shioshishio. At night, Hikari contemplates that Manaka wants to cast off everything and go to a different world. The next day, Chisaki discovers that Tsumugu is making a private swimming pool behind the school, though she wishes that he was not so kind since Hikari is there to take care of Manaka. As Manaka begs Lord Uroko to curse her again, this is interrupted when Akari is brought outside Lord Uroko's shrine for being involved with a land human. Hikari and Akari's widowed father Tomoru Sakishima takes Akari inside the shrine, while Hikari and Manaka helplessly watch.
3	"The Tradition of the Sea"; Transliteration: "Umi no Iitsutae" (Japanese: 海のいいつたえ)	October 17, 2013
Visiting a classroom at their old school, Hikari, Manaka, Chisaki and Kaname discuss what befalls Akari for disobeying the rules of Shioshishio. Manaka and Chisaki go to the school music room, where they discuss that a red-bellied sea slug could determine their future, though Manaka is unsure if she wants to marry Tsumugu someday. At night, Hikari recalls that Akari took care of him after the death of their mother Hokage Sakishima. The next day, Hikari, Manaka, Chisaki and Kaname follow Itaru to Tsumugu and Isamu's house. Tsumugu informs them that a child born from parents of each the sea and the land is born without Ena, which is why a sea human would be banished from Shioshishio if they marry a land human. After Isamu knocks out Hikari for attacking Itaru, Tsumugu soaks Hikari with a damp cloth, restoring his Ena. Hikari discovers that Isamu is a sea human, later learning that Akari plans to break up with Itaru. The following day, Hikari stops being hostile to Tsumugu. After Hikari, Manaka, Chisaki, Kaname and Tsumugu finish building the wooden statue, Tsumugu shows the completed private swimming pool to the others. Manaka confesses to Tsumugu that the curse of the fish head on her right kneecap was lifted. After enjoying a splash in the private swimming pool, Hikari decides to make amends and discreetly follows Itaru to the local store called Saya Mart, where Akari is waiting for Itaru. However, Hikari is ambushed by two girls from Hama Elementary School, Sayu Hisanuma and her best friend Miuna Shiodome. Hikari is shocked when Miuna reveals herself as Itaru's daughter.
4	"Because We're Friends"; Transliteration: "Tomodachi nanda kara" (Japanese: 友達なんだから)	October 24, 2013
Hikari declines to help Miuna and Sayu with an underhanded scheme of ending the affair between Akari and Itaru. During class, Hikari, Manaka, Chisaki, Kaname and Tsumugu make a dish. Two male classmates named Takeshi Egawa and Shun Sayama refuse to sample the dish upon Manaka's request. After Manaka is shoved away and the dish is consequently shattered onto the floor, Takeshi and Shun reluctantly apologize when Tsumugu urges them to do so. Shortly after, Hikari, Manaka, Chisaki and Kaname discover that someone vandalized the wooden statue with graffiti. Hikari accuses Takeshi and Shun of being the culprits, tackling them in retaliation. As Chisaki and Kaname later clean up the graffiti, they realize that the culprit was actually Sayu. Chisaki tries to keep this a secret, believing Hikari will get hurt more because of it, but Tsumugu warns her that lying is not the answer and will only make it worse. Chisaki accuses him of being a terrible person and leaves in tears. while Kaname learns that Tsumugu does not want everyone to misunderstand Hikari just because he misunderstands everyone. After Miuna learns that Sayu vandalized the wooden statue, Miuna reprimands Sayu for playing dirty. While returning home in the sea, Hikari and Manaka rescue Itaru from drowning after he borrowed a faulty scuba set in order to see Akari in Shioshishio. Meanwhile, Akari tells Lord Uroko that she wanted to take care of Miuna and Itaru after her friend Miori Shiodome passed away, which left Miuna without a mother and Itaru without a wife. In the evening, Miuna falsely claims that she vandalized the wooden statue to Hikari and Manaka. The next morning, Hikari makes amends with help from Manaka for wrongfully accusing Takeshi and Shun. Kaname learns that Sayu was a victim of bullying until she befriended Miuna. After Sayu apologizes to Hikari for vandalizing the wooden statue, Chisaki is left feeling useless as she was not able to defend Hikari.
5	"Hey, Sea Slug..."; Transliteration: "Ano ne Umiushi" (Japanese: あのねウミウシ)	October 31, 2013
Tomoru visits Lord Uroko's shrine, where Lord Uroko tells Tomoru that the boundaries between the sea and the land must be permanent. Running late to school, Chisaki encounters Tsumugu at the seawall. Chisaki confides in Tsumugu that she likes Hikari. Manaka overhears this confession, prompting Chisaki to tell Manaka to forget what she heard. At a restaurant, Akari breaks up with Itaru, claiming that Miuna would never accept her. Outside Saya Mart, Akari apologizes to Miuna for causing so much trouble and promises not to bother her anymore. At night, Akari contacts Hikari via telephone booth, informing him that Miuna has disappeared, but Hikari demands that Akari should act as a stepmother to Miuna. Hikari, Manaka, Chisaki and Kaname search all over town and finally find Miuna outside an abandoned shipyard, where they set up camp and eat fish. Manaka tells Miuna that the green-bellied sea slug is edible while the red-bellied sea slug can reveal secrets. After Manaka, Chisaki and Kaname depart, Miuna tells Hikari that she refuses to like Akari. Miuna runs away in despair and jumps into the sea, as it is revealed that Miori was a sea human. Although Miuna is unable to swim, Hikari rescues her from drowning. Miuna admits that she always liked Akari, but she was afraid that Akari might die just like Miori did. Sympathizing with Miuna, Hikari agrees that avoiding love could be easier, but accepting love is not useless. The next morning, a worried Akari finds Hikari and Miuna having slept outside Saya Mart. Breaking down in tears, Akari says that she will never leave Miuna even though she cannot replace Miori.
6	"The Other Side of the Tomoebi"; Transliteration: "Tomoebi no Mukō" (Japanese: 巴日のむこう)	November 7, 2013
The students change into their swimsuits for class. After warming up, Hikari and Tsumugu compete in freestyle swimming, but Hikari ends up cracking his toenail, prompting Manaka to rush in and assist him. Manaka takes Hikari to the school clinic, and tries to get Chisaki to go with them, but she brushes her off. In the clinic, Manaka tries to disinfect Hikari's wound. Hikari is frustrated that Tsumugu can swim faster than him on the surface. Manaka tells him everyone thinks he's amazing, even Chisaki. Hikari angrily asks why she brought her up, but she stays silent. While taking out the trash outside after class, Kaname and female classmate Yū Seiki encounter Miuna and Sayu, who want to help rebuild the wooden statue. Tsumugu leaves after hauling in the veneer. Hikari, Manaka, Chisaki, Kaname, Miuna, Sayu, Takeshi, Shun, Yū and female classmate Kaori Akiyoshi all participate in rebuilding the wooden statue in the school workshop. Chisaki leaves early, but Manaka follows her at the school entrance. Chisaki scolds Manaka for breaking her promise and once again tells her to forget the fact that Chisaki likes Hikari. At the seawall, Manaka encounters Tsumugu, who takes her to the wharf. On the way there, Manaka tells Tsumugu that the Tomoebi is a rare occurrence when a lot of saltflake snow falls and a cold water current flows through, which creates a reflection of three suns only seen from the bottom of the sea. When she was younger, Manaka hesitated to join her friends in witnessing this phenomenon, which caused Chisaki to be upset at Manaka for a while. Tsumugu advises Manaka to speak without hesitating. After Manaka witnesses the Tomoebi, she manages to bring Chisaki with her to see it from the rooftop. Taking Tsumugu's advice, Manaka finally reconciles with Chisaki. Though Manaka and Chisaki regret that Hikari and Kaname are not there to witness the Tomoebi with them, the girls are unaware that the boys are watching it from the ground while overhearing their conversation.
7	"The Ofunehiki Trembles"; Transliteration: "Ofunehiki Yurete" (Japanese: おふねひきゆれて)	November 14, 2013
In the school workshop, the wooden statue is finished being rebuilt. However, the Ofunehiki cannot be held because of the disagreements between Shioshishio and Oshiooshi. Hikari is determined to make the Ofunehiki a reality, motivating the other students to stand outside Saya Mart in order to help collect signatures for a petition to reinstate the Ofunehiki. However, Hikari fails to convince Tomoru in lending his support for the petition. Later on, Manaka and Chisaki discuss how much Hikari has changed. The members of the Shioshishio young men's brigade and the Oshiooshi fishermen's union hold a meeting, which Tomoru happens to attend. Despite the meeting going well at first, it does not take long for both sides to reignite their old feuds. Just as Hikari and Tsumugu try to break up the fight, Akari and Itaru arrive together at the meeting, which causes more disputes. Hikari is consequently knocked into the wooden statue, causing it to topple and break. At the restaurant, Tomoru urges Akari to break up with Itaru, but Akari has already made up her mind and plans to leave the sea. Although Hikari decides to leave with Akari, Lord Uroko prepares to stop both of them using his powers of ice, that is until Tomoru begs Lord Uroko to show mercy on Hikari and Akari.
8	"Beyond the Wavering Feelings"; Transliteration: "Tayutau Omoi no Saki" (Japanese: たゆたう想いのさき)	November 21, 2013
Hikari and Akari move in with Miuna and Itaru on the surface. After eating dinner, Itaru tells Akari that he intends to receive permission and blessing from the sea villagers. Hikari encourages Miuna to find a present for Akari. The next morning, Hikari and Miuna meet up with Manaka, Chisaki, Kaname and Tsumugu at the train station. They travel by train into the city, visiting a shopping mall in order to find an affordable pendant. When Hikari and Chisaki get left behind due to an overcrowded elevator, Chisaki uses this moment to discuss how Hikari feels about Manaka. Hikari claims that he will support Manaka if she chooses to leave the sea in order to be with Tsumugu. Kaname learns that Manaka thinks Tsumugu is incredible at seeing things differently. In the elevator, Chisaki says that she will continue to support Hikari, but he should not change for Manaka. At the jewelry store, Miuna decides to buy a seashell pendant, soon contacting Itaru to give her an advance on twelve allowances. However, she discovers that the seashell pendant is out of stock. Hikari, Manaka, Chisaki, Kaname, Tsumugu and Miuna are out of luck when they search in other stores within the city before traveling back to Oshiooshi. Based on an idea from Tsumugu, Miuna gives Akari a pendant crafted from seashells, fishbones and pearls found on the shore. Hikari is in awe when he sees saltflake snow falling on the surface, a phenomemon that supposedly occurs only in the sea.
9	"Unknown Warmth"; Transliteration: "Shiranai Nukumori" (Japanese: 知らないぬくもり)	November 28, 2013
When news of saltflake snow falling in the surface town reaches the sea village, Lord Uroko tells the men of Shioshishio about an approaching calamity. The students make preparations for the Ofunehiki. Stopping by Saya Mart for groceries, Manaka tells Akari that Hikari worries about being homesick. At Isamu's house, Manaka learns that Tsumugu started living with Isamu when he was nine years old. Isamu lends an apron to Manaka. Chisaki begins to feel lightheaded, prompting Tsumugu to take her to the sea in order to restore her Ena. When Tsumugu asks if Chisaki has given up on Hikari, Chisaki angrily denies her neglected feelings. Kaname arrives and accompanies Chisaki back to Shioshishio, where the sea villagers are standing outside holding lanterns of sacred blue fire. Hikari finds Manaka cooking seafood and pork soup, and she thanks him for being by her side. However, Hikari secretly struggles to support Manaka. As Manaka later returns home, she is told by her parents that she cannot go to the surface anymore. The following day, Hikari learns that Manaka, Chisaki and Kaname are absent from class. As he returns to Shioshishio, Hikari is soon informed by Manaka that no one can leave the sea village. He impulsively embraces her, but she surprisingly pushes him away. As Hikari encounters Tomoru while trying to run off, Tomoru tells Hikari to return home.
10	"The Saltflake Snow Falls and Falls"; Transliteration: "Nukumi Yuki Furufuru" (Japanese: ぬくみ雪ふるふる)	December 5, 2013
Lord Uroko tells Hikari, Manaka and Tomoru that the Sea God is gradually losing his strength after many sea humans forgot about him and drifted away. The saltflake snow will continue to fall and amass, the world will begin to cool significantly and people will not be able to bear the icy temperatures that follow. In order to escape the upcoming demise of inevitable freezing, the sea humans must enter into hibernation, as they wait for the Sea God to regain his colossal power. After Manaka runs off, Hikari returns to his messy home, where Tomoru informs him that the sea villagers will gather for a feast on Friday before starting a fasting period in order to thicken their Ena for hibernation. Hikari believes that performing the Ofunehiki will prevent the approaching calamity and please the Sea God. Lord Uroko eventually allows Hikari, Manaka, Chisaki and Kaname to attend school on the surface until it is time to enter into hibernation. After informing Miuna, Akari and Itaru about the approaching calamity, Hikari tells his classmates that the Ofunehiki is their last resort. Miuna and Sayu discuss about the possibility of losing precious things, while Tsumugu and Isamu discuss how saltflake snow could have permanent environmental changes. During the feast, a distraught Manaka tells Chisaki and Kaname that everyone might not wake up together from hibernation. Having Hikari on her mind, Manaka finds a red-bellied sea slug in her bedroom, and she prepares to share her secret. The following day, Kaname confesses his true feelings to Chisaki.
11	"The Changing Times"; Transliteration: "Kawariyuku Toki" (Japanese: 変わりゆくとき)	December 12, 2013
After Kaname confesses his true feelings to Chisaki, they accompany Hikari and Manaka to school as if nothing had happened. The sea villagers begin their fasting period, which thickens their Ena for hibernation. Akari and Itaru fill out a marriage license, planning for a wedding ceremony. During class, Hikari, Manaka, Chisaki and Kaname are forced to restore their Ena in the private swimming pool, since their Ena requires more saltwater than usual when it is thicker. Fearing that they might never see each other after their hibernation, the four are encouraged by Tsumugu to end their fasting period in order to delay the process. The Oshiooshi fishermen's union requests Hikari to go through with the Ofunehiki, and Akari asks Hikari to consider it. However, Lord Uroko later claims that nothing will change if Hikari does go through with the Ofunehiki. Akari requests the surface townspeople to put on the Ofunehiki and have her wedding ceremony together. She also wants to take the place of the wooden statue, claiming that she will be fully determined to marry Itaru when the Ofunehiki is over. Everyone continues making preparations for the Ofunehiki at the shipyard. Following Kaname's example, Chisaki decides that she wants to confess her true feelings to Hikari.
12	"I Want to be Kind"; Transliteration: "Yasashiku Naritai" (Japanese: 優しくなりたい)	December 19, 2013
While picking flowers for a flower bouquet, Miuna and Sayu discuss that they do not want Hikari or Kaname to leave them. Miuna and Sayu are then approached by Tomoru, who tells them that the surface will not be in any danger until far off into the future. In the city, Tsumugu accompanies Manaka and Chisaki in order to find and purchase a special kimono. Tsumugu briefly encounters his mother, but he seems displeased with her. At the restaurant, Akari tells Tomoru that the Ofunehiki and the hibernation will fall on the same day. Being reminded of the love that Tomoru had with Hikari and Akari after Hokage died, Akari desires to have the same love with Miuna and Itaru. Hikari is shown the flag that he will be assigned to wave during the Ofunehiki. On the way back to Ofunehiki, Chisaki apologizes to Tsumugu for how she acted before. Back at Shioshishio, Tomoru tells Hikaru, Manaka, Chisaki and Kaname that the younger sea villagers have already entered into hibernation. It is only a matter of time before the four of them will enter into hibernation as well. While visiting their old school, Kaname forces Hikari to share his true feelings to Manaka, as they might never wake up from hibernation. When Hikari finally confesses his true feelings to Manaka, she runs away shocked and confused, stating she doesn't understand love. Hikari chases after Manaka, but Chisaki stops Hikari. Chisaki confesses her true feelings to Hikari, but realizes he has no place in her heart, that she was in love with the Hikari that loves Manaka, and states that telling him her feelings is enough without being reciprocated, and encourages him to go after Manaka. Hikari admits he was afraid of change like her and reassures Chisaki that their friendships will not change. After seeing her mother almost ready for hibernation, Manaka runs away from home, only to be caught in a fishing net by Tsumugu.
13	"Fingertips Beyond Reach"; Transliteration: "Todokanu Yubisaki" (Japanese: 届かぬゆびさき)	December 26, 2013
On Tsumugu's fishing boat, Manaka recalls seeing the sun from the bottom of the sea when she was younger, comparing the sun to Tsumugu. Hikari contemplates his feelings for Manaka, seeing himself as a ship caught in the middle of a stormy sea. Manaka returns home and runs into Hikari. He says that she is precious to him, and she says that she has something to tell him after the Ofunehiki. On the day of the Ofunehiki, the sea villagers prepare for hibernation. Hikari, Manaka, Chisaki and Kaname pay their respects to Lord Uroko and Tomoru before heading to the surface. Takeshi and Shun encourage Hikari to wear a happi coat, while Manaka is amazed when Akari dresses in the special kimono. While the ceremony begins, Lord Uroko lights a path for the fishing boats to drift across. However, the fishing boats are surrounded by whirlpools, dragging both Akari and Tsumugu into the sea. Chisaki and Kaname dive in and rescue Tsumugu. When they make it back to their fishing boat, it is steered away from a falling bridge pier, causing Kaname to fall back into the sea. Meanwhile, Hikari dives in and rescues Akari, while Manaka offers herself as the sacrifice maiden to the Sea God, in which Hikari is swept away by the whirlpools. A strange barrier covers Shioshishio, while Akari is found floating offshore. Hikari, Manaka and Kaname are nowhere to be found. Out of the four friends only Chisaki appears to have survived.
14	"The Promised Day"; Transliteration: "Yakusoku no Hi" (Japanese: 約束の日)	January 9, 2014
Five years later, the sea is covered in sea ice while the surface suffers a prolonged winter. Chisaki visits Isamu at Naminanami Public Hospital. Hitching a ride with Shun to Saya Mart, Chisaki learns that Takeshi is planning on getting married. Chisaki meets up with Akari and her mischievous son Akira Shiodome. Akari recalls that Itaru started to worry her when she was pregnant, but Miuna managed to console her. During class, it is shown that Miuna and Sayu are classmates in Mihama Junior High School. The students are informed that the Tomoebi will create an illusory moon and can be seen on the surface. Sayu warns Miuna that their classmate Atsushi Minegishi intends to confess his feelings to Miuna during the Tomoebi. While thinking about Hikari, Miuna recalls when Akari said that Hikari likes Manaka. Chisaki has dinner with Tsumugu and his research professor Satoru Mihashi, who believes that the fourteen sea villages in existence cannot be accessed right now. Five years ago, Chisaki was taken in by Tsumugu and Isamu. After Isamu was hospitalized, Tsumugu left to study oceanography in college, hoping to find out about the sea villages and their connection to the surface. In the present, Tsumugu and Satori study the sea currents before the Tomoebi begins. Miuna rejects Atsushi before he confesses his feelings, claiming that she is already in love with someone else. As the Tomoebi begins, Miuna meets Tsumugu where the moonlight reflects from the sea ice. They find a naked Hikari nearby, surprised that he has not aged since his disappearance five years ago.
15	"The Protector of Smiles"; Transliteration: "Egao no Mamoribito" (Japanese: 笑顔の守り人)	January 16, 2014
Tsumugu informs Chisaki about the return of Hikari, who is staying with Akari, Itaru, Miuna and Akira. However, Chisaki refrains from meeting with Hikari. Miuna, Sayu and Shun bring Hikari to see the Oshiooshi fishermen's union. Hikari is presented with his old Ofunehiki flag, which was recovered from the wreckage of the fallen bridge pier. Miuna and Sayu head to school, while Shun takes Hikari back home. At night, Chisaki confides in Tsumugu that she is afraid of how Hikari will react upon seeing her. The next morning, Hikari attempts to swim back to Shioshishio, but the sea currents drive him back to Oshiooshi. Passing by on his fishing boat, Tsumugu wonders why Hikari has not visited Chisaki yet. Hikari expresses how overwhelmed he is by all the changes, afraid that Chisaki has changed as well. While Hikari walks home, the Ofunehiki song is being broadcast from a radio tower. Going to investigate the source, Hikari runs into Chisaki, who tells him that the Ofunehiki song is broadcast everyday at five o'clock for the sleeping sea villagers. She apologizes for changing so much, but he says that she has not changed at all. Determined to face all the changes, Hikari runs back home, where he is greeted by Miuna waving the restored Ofunehiki flag with the addition of hearts and butterflies. Miuna wants to make sure that Hikari is happy. When Chisaki returns home, Tsumugu realizes that she has seen Hikari.
16	"The Whispers of the Faraway Waves"; Transliteration: "Tōi Nami no Sasayaki" (Japanese: 遠い波のささやき)	January 23, 2014
Hikari goes back to school with Miuna and Sayu as his classmates. While walking home, Hikari protects Miuna from an oncoming reckless driver. Then, Hikari notices an awkward encounter between Miuna and Atsushi. Upon returning home, Hikari is lent Tsumugu's old school uniform, only to realize that it runs big. Before bedtime, Akari thanks Itaru for letting Hikari stay with them. The next morning, Akira comes down with rubella, prompting Akari and Itaru to take care of him. Hikari and Miuna meet up with Sayu at the train station. They go to the city so Hikari can purchase a new school uniform from a tailor. Miuna insists that the tailor should make a school uniform from Nami Junior High School instead of Mihama Junior High School. Waiting outside, Saya is jealous that Miuna has Hikari to flirt with, while Saya still waits for Kaname and both have a falling out in the process. Deciding not to get his school uniform made, Hikari sees Miuna run off and Sayu break down in tears. Hikari and Sayu hitch a ride with Shun back into the surface town, though Hikari decides to stop by the shipyard. Hikari finds Miuna and cheers her up, but a container crane collapses between them, causing Miuna to fall off into the sea. Miuna hears the sound of flowing sand and discovers that she has developed her own Ena, allowing her to swim and breathe underwater. Hikari finds and brings Miuna back to the surface. When they are out of the water, they find a worried Sayu waiting outside the shipyard, and Miuna apologizes to Saya. Elsewhere, Kaname is seen wandering around naked, approaching the restaurant bartender and asking about today's date.
17	"The Sick Two"; Transliteration: "Byōki na Futari" (Japanese: ビョーキなふたり)	January 30, 2014
Akari goes with Hikari and Miuna to the Oshiooshi fishermen's union, where Kaname is being examined by Satoru. Chisaki and Tsumugu also reunite with Kaname, who faintly remembers hearing the sound of flowing sand when he first awakened. It is only a matter of time until the other sea villagers awaken. After moving in with Chisaki and Tsumugu, Kaname becomes uncomfortable that the two have become closer. The next day, Sayu is anxious about meeting Kaname again, still harboring unrequited love for him. After school, Sayu overhears Kaname talking to Shun, who was just driving by. However, Sayu flees in tears when Kaname fails to recognize her. While walking with Chisaki, Kaname asks how she has changed since his absence. The following day, Hikari and Kaname sit by the private swimming pool while discussing all the changes. Miuna overhears Hikari declaring that he will not change until he reunites with Manaka. At the shipyard, Miuna has another falling-out with Sayu, who decides to discard her unrequited love for Kaname in order to move on with her life, while Miuna refuses to give up her love for Hikari. Later in the streets, Kaname calls out for Sayu, who realizes that she is lovesick just like Miuna. At night, Tsumugu and Satoru inform Hikari, Kaname, Miuna and Akari that a weak sea current surrounding Shioshishio has been pinpointed. On the day after, Hikari, Kaname and Miuna decide to dive into the sea. Miuna leads Hikari and Kaname to Shioshishio, following the sound of flowing sand that only Miuna can clearly hear.
18	"Shioshishio"; Transliteration: "Shioshishio" (Japanese: シオシシオ)	February 6, 2014
Shioshishio is completely covered in saltflake snow, and the sea villagers are still asleep. Anxious about looking for Manaka, Hikari returns to his house and pays a visit to a hibernating Tomoru, while Kaname stops by his house. As she waits for Hikari and Kaname to return, Miuna hears the sound of flowing sand, leading her to Nami Junior High School, where she sees glimpses of how Hikari, Manaka, Chisaki and Kaname used to spend their days there. Going outside, Miuna soon encounters Lord Uroko, as she tells him that she is searching for Manaka. Lord Uroko vanishes when Hikari and Kaname find Miuna. As she hears the sound of flowing sand again, Miuna leads Hikari and Kaname to a hidden trench where they eventually find a naked Manaka still asleep within a pit of many wooden statues of Lady Ojoshi. The sound of flowing sand is coming from Manaka's Ena slowing chipping away, which puts her at risk of dying. As the trench starts to collapse, Hikari, Kaname and Miuna leave Shioshishio and head back to the surface with the unconscious Manaka in tow.
19	"The Lost, Lost Little..."; Transliteration: "Maigo no Maigo no..." (Japanese: まいごの迷子の。。。)	February 13, 2014
Thanks to a house call, Manaka seems to be pretty healthy and should awaken soon. While Miuna eavesdrops on Hikari by Manaka's bedside, Chisaki realizes that Miuna is developing real feelings for Hikari. At Naminanami Public Hospital, Isamu tells Chisaki that there is a sad ending to the story of the Ofunehiki. While Chisaki, Kaname and Tsumugu have dinner in the evening, Tsumugu tells Chisaki and Kaname that Satoru must present a thesis of his data regarding the link between the abnormal weather and the sea village, or else the research will not receive funding anymore. At night, Chisaki struggles to try on her old school uniform. Later on, Chisaki and Tsumugu drink some plum wine together. When Chisaki falls asleep, Tsumugu thanks Kaname for saving him from drowning in the past, but Kaname confess that he actually wanted to let him die, but chose not to because of Chisaki. The next day, Chisaki dives into the sea alone, but the sea currents sweep her away until Hikari comes to help her. Arriving at Shioshishio, Chisaki tells Hikari about the sad ending to the story of the Ofunehiki, Lady Ojoshi offered herself as a sacrifice maiden to the Sea God, but Lady Ojoshi became depressed because she left behind her husband on the surface. The Sea God eventually let Lady Ojoshi go back to the surface, but he took something from her in return. As Chisaki believes that the Sea God took away Lady Ojoshi's Ena, Hikari becomes certain that this is related to Manaka losing her Ena. Hikari is determined to find Lord Uroko, who may hold the key to the answers. As Hikari and Chisaki head back to the surface, Chisaki realizes that she still likes Hikari. Manaka has yet to awaken after one week passes.
20	"Sleeping Beauty"; Transliteration: "Nemuri Hime" (Japanese: ねむりひめ)	February 20, 2014
Hikari, Chisaki and Kaname have no success with finding Lord Uroko. After hearing the Ofunehiki song being broadcast from the radio tower, Hikari, Chisaki and Kaname ask Itaru to have the Oshiooshi fishermen's union tape-record the Ofunehiki song so Manaka can hear it in her sleep. When Hikari returns home in the evening, a rift is created when Miuna reprimands Hikari for intending to cut class so he could find a way to awaken Manaka, even hoping she never does. This angers Hikari, who yells at her and runs away as she tries to take back what she said. The next day, Miuna and Sayu read in the school library while discussing that a handsome prince must kiss a sleeping princess in order to wake her up. However, Miuna starts wondering if she secretly hopes that Manaka never wakes up. Later at home, a feverish Hikari faints while mistaking Miuna for Manaka. The following day, Miuna feigns having a fever in order to stay home and take care of Hikari. Tsumugu calls Miuna to discuss her evaluation further, but he hears her crying and asks her to meet with him in person at a pier. He reveals that he hoped Hikari and the others didn't wake up as he was afraid that he would lose hold of Chisaki, but he was happy that Hikari and Kaname woke up in the end. After returning home, Miuna suggests that Hikari should kiss Manaka in hopes of waking her up, since strong feelings for somebody could create a power that can change things. As a flustered Hikari argues with Miuna, Manaka awakens and scolds Hikari, much to the shock and awe of Hikari and Miuna.
21	"The Messenger from the Bottom of the Sea"; Transliteration: "Minasoko Yori no Tsukai" (Japanese: 水底よりの使い)	February 27, 2014
Hikari and Manaka meet up with Chisaki and Kaname outside Saya Mart. In the private swimming pool, Miuna tells Sayu that she does not know how to approach Manaka. At the harbor, Manaka is surprisingly cheerful to see a lot of saltflake snow everywhere. Noticing that Manaka is acting as if nothing has changed, Kaname tells Hikari that Manaka has friends who support her. Later at night, Manaka tells Hikari that she heard an unrecognizable voice telling her to give something up. On Sunday, Hikari, Manaka, Chisaki and Kaname go to the school rooftop. They run into Miuna and Sayu, who talk about studying for algebra. Before leaving, Chisaki gives five salt cream puffs to the others. After tending to Isamu at Naminanami Public Hospital, Chisaki learns from Tsumugu that he will be going back to the university at the end of the month in order to finish the research, but he will keep in close contact and come back home quickly if necessary. Chisaki says that Tsumugu must be sad, but he says that it is because she is sad as well. Hikari, Manaka, Kaname, Miuna, Sayu, Akari and Akira have dinner together, while the subject of entrance exams is discussed. Hikari privately asks Manaka about what she was going to tell him after the Ofunehiki, but she does not remember. The following morning, Tsumugu rushes to see the others, showing that he has been cursed by Lord Uroko with a fish head growing out of his left elbow. Hikari concludes that Lord Uroko must be nearby.
22	"What Was Lost"; Transliteration: "Nakushita Mono" (Japanese: 失くしたもの)	March 6, 2014
Hikari, Manaka, Miuna and Sayu have no luck with luring Lord Uroko. Chisaki, Kaname and Tsumugu see the saltflake snow falling outside. The news reports that the saltflake snow is falling more frequently and is spreading further inland. Satoru is called back to the university due to the bad weather, but Tsumugu decides to stay a little longer in Oshiooshi. Kaname realizes that Tsumugu truly intends to stay near Chisaki. Hikari runs away after deducing that Manaka cannot remember any of their bonding moments. As Miuna catches up to Hikari at a nearby shrine, they finally meet Lord Uroko, who explains that the Sea God eventually died after letting Lady Ojoshi go back to the surface, in which fragments of the Sea God's raw emotions became one with the sea. The sea was calmed and the cooling temperatures were delayed when Manaka became a sacrifice maiden to the Sea God, that is until she was taken back to the surface. However, the truth of the matter is that Manaka's ability to fall in love was taken away. A desperate Hikari then realizes that his feelings for Manaka will never reach her at all in her current state.
23	"Who Do These Feelings Belong To?"; Transliteration: "Kono Kimochi wa Dare no Mono" (Japanese: この気持ちは誰のもの)	March 13, 2014
Miuna eventually convinces Hikari to tell his friends what Lord Uroko said about Manaka. During the meeting, Tsumugu points out that this has to do with love. Chisaki and Kaname each believe that Manaka might be better off not falling in love. Sayu storms out after lashing out at the two for thinking such a thing, and Hikari also leaves after he lectures them, stating that there is something wrong with the two. Following the meeting, Sayu goes home after telling Hikari and Miuna there is nothing more important than loving someone. Hikari and Miuna meet up with Manaka and Akira at the shipyard, where they find a shiny rock produced from a red-bellied sea slug, and Manaka is told by Hikari to hang on to the shiny rock. While washing dishes at home, Hikari tells Miuna that Manaka revealed her secret to a red-bellied sea slug five years ago, and the shiny rock may have come from the same red-bellied sea slug. Hikari hopes that Manaka will regain her lost memories of love someday. The next day, Sayu tells Miuna about her plan of confessing her feelings to Kaname even if it is feelings of unrequited love. Miuna makes a pendant from the shiny rock for Manaka so she would not lose it. Tsumugu informs Hikari that he will be going back to the university soon. Although Hikari insists that Tsumugu should spend time with Manaka in hopes of regaining her lost feelings, Tsumugu responds that he does not have genuine feelings for Manaka and warns him he can't forced such things to him. In fact, Tsumugu admits that he has feelings for Chisaki, who overhears the confession while getting off the bus. A shocked Chisaki dives into the sea, prompting Tsumugu to dive in and chase after her. Much to Hikari's surprise, Tsumugu eventually develops his own Ena after almost drowning, which causes the entire fish to depart from his left elbow, thereby lifting the curse. Tsumugu finds Chisaki in Shioshishio, where he compares her to the sea, describing her as quiet and calm yet fierce and uncontrollable.
24	"Detritus"; Transliteration: "Detoritasu" (Japanese: デトリタス)	March 20, 2014
Tsumugu confesses his feelings to Chisaki, but she rejects him and runs away. Chisaki returns home and encounters Kaname, who encourages her to be honest with her feelings for Tsumugu, but Chisaki claims that she would betray her feelings for Hikari despite knowing that he still loves Manaka. Akira gives a love letter to Manaka, who runs to her bedroom crying since she cannot comprehend love. The next day, Chisaki goes to Naminanami Public Hospital, where she asks Isamu about what happened after Lady Ojoshi returned to the surface. Isamu reveals that Lady Ojoshi did not reunite with her husband, who drowned in the sea while attempting to look for her. Hikari, Kaname and Tsumugu pay a visit to Lord Uroko at the shrine. Tsumugu explains that he sensed multitude of feelings from the Sea God and Manaka ever since his Ena awakened. He suggests that Manaka might regain her lost feelings if they use Manaka's pendant on a wooden statue, so this would satisfy the Sea God and restore stability to the surface. Amused by this, Lord Uroko agrees to help. The surface townspeople, including the former classmates, all gather together in order to make preparations for the Ofunehiki at the shipyard. When Chisaki suggests taking the place of the wooden statue, Tsumugu strongly objects and silences her. Kaname overhears the conversation and is soon followed by Sayu, who was spying on Kaname. After Sayu scolds Kaname for hiding his feelings for Chisaki, Kaname believes that telling her would not matter since Chisaki was always in love with someone else. Sayu then confesses her feelings to Kaname, which touches him dearly. He asks her if he can start over by seeing her as a girl at his age rather than a girl half his age. In the shipyard at dawn, Hikari tells Manaka that he is in love with someone, but he says that she will find out who it is after the Ofunehiki.
25	"Love is Like the Sea"; Transliteration: "Suki wa, Umi to Nite Iru." (Japanese: 好きは、海と似ている。)	March 27, 2014
On the eve of the Ofunehiki, Akira snatches Manaka's pendant from the wooden statue and accidentally drops it into the sea. Miuna dives in and retrieves Manaka's pendant, in which the shiny rock captured the secret of Manaka declaring her love for Hikari five years ago. Having also dived in, Tsumugu knew that Manaka loved Hikari from a conversation that Manaka and Tsumugu had on his fishing boat at that time. Tsumugu tells Miuna that Manaka requested him to not tell anyone about this because Manaka knew that Chisaki was in love with Hikari. Later at night, Chisaki and Tsumugu share an embrace after he reveals to her that Manaka was in love with Hikari, allowing Chisaki to move on from Hikari for good. Miuna follows Hikari to the beach, where he admits to her that he loves Manaka. Demanding Hikari to repeatedly declare his love for Manaka, he gets annoyed and warns her to stop, but Miuna abruptly runs back home in tears, hoping this will convince her to finally give up on Hikari. On the day of the Ofunehiki, the ceremony begins as the fishing boats drift across the sea with sacred blue fire on torches provided by Lord Uroko. However, the fishing boats are surrounded by the same whirlpools from before, dragging Manaka into the sea. Hikari, Chisaki, Tsumugu and Miuna dive into the sea, but only Miuna manages to reach Manaka. Tsumugu tells Hikari and Chisaki that Manaka and Miuna are connected because of their shared feelings for Hikari. Miuna is able to transfer some of her Ena to Manaka. Shoving Manaka away, Miuna is swept away by the whirlpools to the pit inside the trench, where she becomes the new sacrifice maiden to the Sea God. Hikari cannot reach Miuna due to a barrier surrounding her. As the wooden statue with Manaka's pendant descends into the pit, the voice of Manaka declaring her love for Hikari can be heard. Miuna smiles as she internally declares her love for Hikari, who screams out her name in agony.
26	"Color of the Sea. Color of the Land. Color of the Wind. Color of the Heart. Color of You. ~Earth Color of a Calm~"; Transliteration: "Umi no Iro. Daichi no Iro. Kaze no Iro. Kokoro no Iro. Kimi no Iro. ~Āsu karā ofu ā kāmu~" (Japanese: 海の色。 大地の色。 風の色。 心の色。 君の色。 〜Earth color of a calm〜)	April 3, 2014
Manaka regains her lost feelings when Chisaki brings her back to the surface. It is explained that the Sea God took away the feelings of Lady Ojoshi in order to protect her from the grief of losing her husband. Since Hikari cannot break the barrier surrounding Miuna, Tsumugu looks for help and finds Lord Uroko outside the trench. Blaming himself for being oblivious of Miuna's feelings for him, Hikari offers to give up his ability to love to the Sea God in place of Miuna. The sacred blue fire engulfs the pit and destroys the wooden statues, allowing Hikari to break the barrier and rescue Miuna. Lord Uroko realizes that Lady Ojoshi was in love with the Sea God. As the first sea villager to awaken from his hibernation, Tomoru greets Hikari and Miuna, revealing that he heard Hikari talk to him during his hibernation. With the calm sea now moving, the remaining sea villagers awaken and greet the surface townspeople. Some time later, life returns to normal for the sea villagers and the surface townspeople. Miuna is able to move past her feelings for Hikari. Akira has developed his own Ena, Tsumugu plans to go back to the university, Isamu is back at home and Lord Uroko notices that the saltflake snow has stopped falling. As Hikari and Manaka walk along the beach, she tries to explain what she was gonna tell him after the Ofunehiki five years ago, but he responds that he already knows what she was going to say. They look at the horizon above the sea, now certain of their feelings for each other.
