= NCSS =

NCSS may refer to:

- National Center for Sports Safety
- National Computer Science School
- National Cooperative Soil Survey
- National Council for the Social Studies
- National Council of Social Service (Singapore)
- National Council of Social Services (United Kingdom)
- National CSS, a computer time-sharing vendor of the 60s-80s
- NCSS (statistical software)
- Niue Community Service Star
- Northwoods Community Secondary School
