= Larry Lemak =

Lawrence Lemak
- Born: June 10, 1943; Pittsburgh, Pennsylvania
- Occupations: Orthopedic Surgeon; Sports Medicine
- Known for: Lemak Sports Medicine & Orthopedics; American Sports Medicine Institute; Alabama Sports Medicine & Orthopedic Center
- Spouse: Georgine Lemak
- Children: 3

Lawrence J. Lemak (born 1943; Pittsburgh, Pennsylvania) is an orthopedic surgeon who practices at the Lemak Sports Medicine & Orthopedics in Birmingham, Alabama. He is a sports medicine and orthopedic surgeon, specializing in arthroscopy and reconstruction of the knee, shoulder, hip and elbow.

In 1986, Lemak and his partner James Andrews founded the Alabama Sports Medicine and Orthopedic Center (ASMOC) as well as the American Sports Medicine Institute (ASMI) in Birmingham. Lemak has played an integral role in sports medicine and arthroscopy research as a founder and member of the board of directors for the American Sports Medicine Institute (ASMI).

In 2001, Lemak founded the National Center for Sports Safety, a non-profit organization dedicated to promoting the importance of injury prevention and safety in youth sports.

On October 8, 2009, the United Football League announced that Lemak would serve as Chief Medical Officer to the League.

== Affiliations ==
Lemak is a member and Fellow of the American Academy of Orthopedic Surgeons (FAAOS) and member of and the American Orthopaedic Society for Sports Medicine. Lemak serves as medical director for Major League Soccer, the PGA and the LPGA and formerly for NFL Europe.

Lemak serves as team physician for Auburn University, Samford University, Birmingham–Southern College, Jacksonville State University, and as the Sports Commissioner for the State of Alabama. He is a clinical assistant professor at the University of Virginia and the University of Alabama at Birmingham. In addition, Lemak served as Chair of the Department of Orthopaedics at The University of South Florida from 2004 through 2008, and was largely responsible for re-establishing the Department of Orthopaedics at USF. A board-certified surgeon, with a Medical degree from the University of Alabama and an Orthopaedic Residency completed at the University of Pittsburgh.
