= Enhabit =

American health care company

Enhabit, Inc.
- Formerly: Encompass Health Home Health & Hospice
- Company type: Private company
- Industry: Healthcare
- Founded: 2022; 4 years ago
- Headquarters: Dallas, Texas, U.S.
- Key people: Jeffrey Bolton (chairman); Barbara Jacobsmeyer (president & CEO); Ryan Solomon (CFO)
- Products: Home Health; Hospice
- Revenue: ▼US$1.04 billion (2023)
- Number of employees: 10,800 (2023)
- Website: ehab.com

Enhabit, Inc., is a Dallas, Texas-based provider of home health and hospice services. The company operates 255 home health and 110 hospice locations in 34 states with a concentration in Texas, Alabama, Florida, Georgia, Oklahoma and Mississippi. Enhabit is the fourth-largest provider of home health services in the United States and is a leading provider of hospice services. The company was formed in 2022 when Encompass Health spun off its home health and hospice business.

In May 2026, private equity firm Kinderhook Industries purchased Enhabit for $1.1 billion, taking the company private.

== Founding ==
Enhabit was founded in 2022 when Encompass Health spun off its home health and hospice business. The company traces its roots back to Encompass Home Health, Inc., a home health and hospice provider formed in 1998 in Dallas, Texas. Encompass Home Health grew gradually after its founding, adding locations in Texas, Oklahoma, and New Mexico. In 2004, its founding management sold a controlling stake in the company to Apax Partners.

Encompass Home Health was recapitalized in 2007 when private equity and investment firm Thoma Cressey Bravo bought Apax Partner's interest in the company. Thoma Cressey Bravo split into two firms in 2008, Thoma Bravo and Cressey & Company, with the latter taking ownership in Encompass Home Health. By 2014, Encompass Home Health had 140 locations across 13 states, 5,000 employees, and was the fifth largest provider of Medicare-focused, skilled home health services in the U.S.

== Encompass Health ==
HealthSouth, a Birmingham, Alabama-based provider of inpatient rehabilitation services, purchased Encompass Home Health from Cressey & Company in 2014 for $750 million. HealthSouth combined its own home health and hospice operation with the acquired business, which continued to operate under the Encompass Home Health & Hospice brand name and remained based in Dallas.

HealthSouth purchased the home health operations of CareSouth Health Systems of Augusta, Georgia for $170 million in 2015. The deal included 45 locations in 7 states and expanded Encompass Home Health & Hospice to new states including Alabama, Georgia, North Carolina, South Carolina, and Tennessee. It also increased its market share in Florida and Virginia.

HealthSouth changed its name to Encompass Health in 2018, bringing the inpatient rehabilitation hospitals and the home health and hospice business under one name. The home health and hospice business became known as Encompass Health Home Health & Hospice.

Encompass Health purchased Hattiesburg, Mississippi-based Camellia Healthcare in 2018. The purchase added 14 home health and 18 hospice locations in Mississippi, Alabama, Louisiana and Tennessee.

The company purchased Birmingham-based Alacare Home Health & Hospice in 2019 for $217.5 million. The purchase included 23 home health locations and 23 hospice locations across Alabama and made Encompass Health the largest provider of home health and hospice services in Alabama.

Encompass Health purchased Frontier Home Health and Hospice in 2021. The purchase added 20 home health and hospice locations in Alaska, Colorado, Montana, Washington and Wyoming to its network.

== Spin-off ==
Encompass Health came under pressure from activist investor Jana Partners in 2020 to sell its home health and hospice business. The home health and hospice industry was facing challenges following the COVID-19 pandemic and Medicare sequestration. Encompass Health rebuffed Jana Partners' actions but began looking at alternatives for the business. Options included continuing to operate the business under Encompass Health, selling it, or spinning it off to shareholders as a separate publicly traded company. The company ultimately chose to spin-off the business which occurred in July 2022 with the creation of Enhabit, Inc.

Encompass Health's COO, Barbara Jacobsmeyer, became the CEO of the new company and Crissy Carlisle, head of investor relations for Encompass Health, became its CFO. Several board members from Encompass Health also left the company to join Enhabit's board of directors, including longtime board member and Encompass Health chairman, Leo Higdon, who became chairman of Enhabit. Higdon stepped down as chairman and board member in 2024 after declining to seek reelection.
