= Optum =

American healthcare services provider

Optum, Inc.

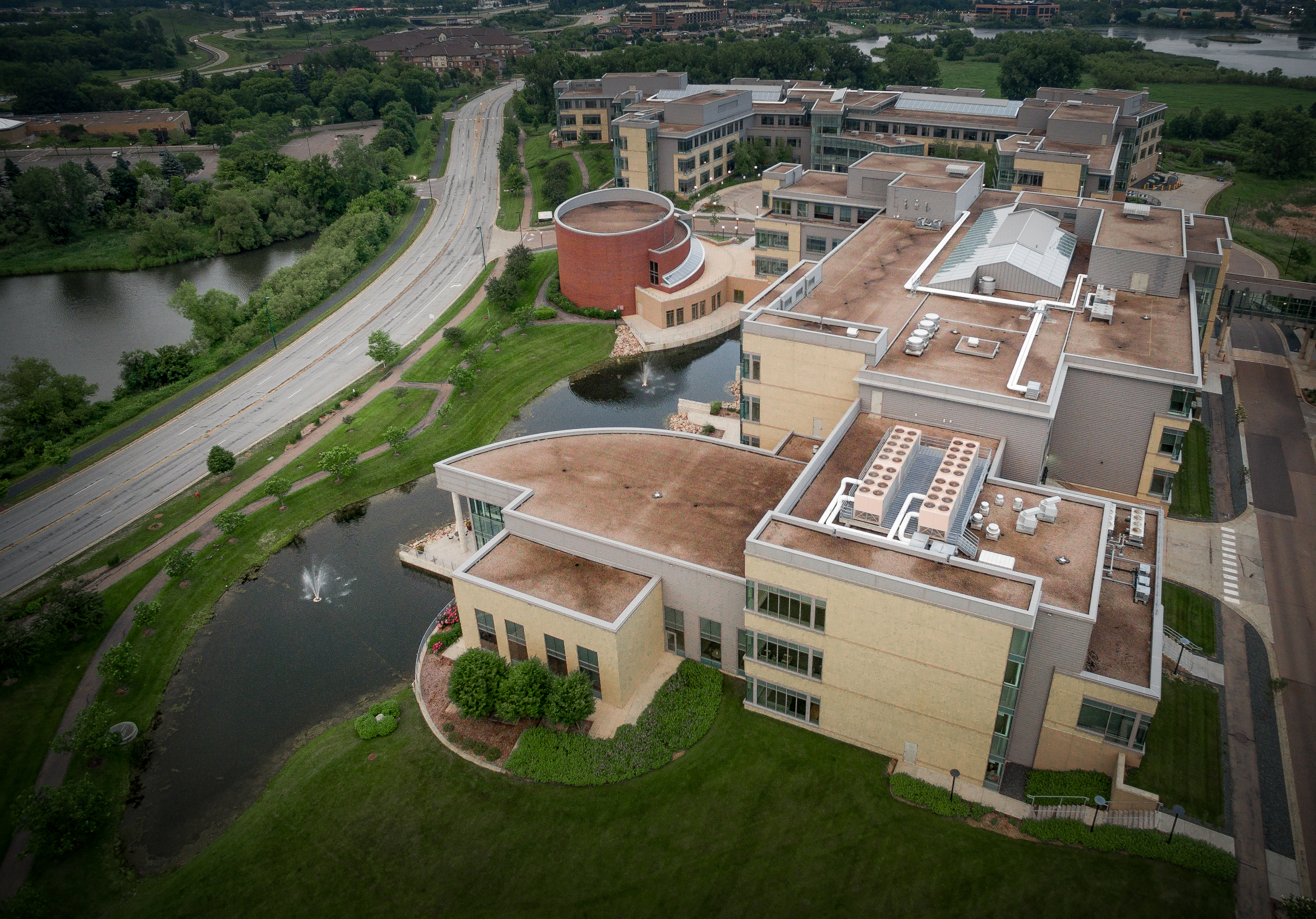
- Optum headquarters in 2015
- Type: Subsidiary
- Industry: Healthcare
- Founded: 2011 (15 years ago)
- Headquarters: Eden Prairie, Minnesota, U.S.
- Key people: Patrick Conway (CEO); Stephen J. Hemsley (CEO of parent company, UnitedHealth Group)
- Brands: OptumInsight; OptumRx; OptumHealth
- Services: Pharmacy benefit manager, Healthcare provider
- Revenue: US$270.6 billion (2025)
- Parent: UnitedHealth Group
- Website: optum.com

Optum, Inc. is an American healthcare company that provides technology services, pharmacy-care services (including a pharmacy benefit manager) and various direct healthcare services, headquartered in Eden Prairie, Minnesota, United States.

Optum was formed as a subsidiary of UnitedHealth Group in 2011 by merging UnitedHealth's existing pharmacy and care delivery services into the single Optum brand, comprising three main businesses: OptumHealth, OptumInsight and OptumRx.

From the late 2010s through the early 2020s, Optum expanded significantly through a series of mergers and acquisitions. In 2017, the company accounted for 44 percent of UnitedHealth Group's profits. In 2019, Optum's revenues surpassed $100 billion for the first time, growing by 11.1 percent year over year, making it UnitedHealth's fastest-growing unit at the time.

== History ==
=== Organization ===
Optum's three businesses, OptumRx, OptumHealth and OptumInsight focus on five core capabilities: data and analytics, pharmacy care services, population health, healthcare delivery and healthcare operations. Optum serves employers, government agencies, health plans, life science companies, care providers and individuals and families, offering products in data and analytics, pharmacy care services, healthcare operations and delivery, population health management and advisory services. The Optum Serve division provides health-related services to U.S. government agencies. In January 2013, Optum, in partnership with the Mayo Clinic, unveiled Optum Labs, a health-data initiative. In October 2013, Optum, in partnership with Dignity Health, launched Optum 360, a revenue-cycle management venture.

=== Major acquisitions ===
Since Optum's founding in 2011, the company has acquired various healthcare technology services to build out its pharmacy-benefit manager and care services offerings.

- February 2014: Optum purchases a majority stake in Audax Health Solutions, a digital health company working to incentivize better consumer-health behaviors. Audax is later rebranded as Rally Health.
- April 2015: Optum acquires MedExpress, an urgent-care and preventative services company.
- July 2015: Catamaran, a pharmacy-benefit manager, joins OptumRx.
- January 2017: Optum acquires Surgical Care Affiliates, an ambulatory surgery center and surgical hospital provider.
- August 2017: Optum announces it will acquire Advisory Board Company's healthcare business.
- December 2017: Optum announces acquisition of DaVita Medical Group from DaVita Inc.
- April 2018: Optum acquires Reliant Medical Group, the largest independent group medical practice in Massachusetts.
- September 2018: OptumRx announces acquisition of Genoa Healthcare, a pharmacy specializing in chronic disease management.
- September 2019: UnitedHealth Group announces acquisition of Equian, LLC for $3.2 billion. A Payment Integrity Institution that has joined the Optum family.
- October 2019: Optum acquired hCentive, Inc., a Reston, Virginia–based developer of software for health insurance marketplaces (terms undisclosed).
- January 2021: UnitedHealth Group announces acquisition of Change Healthcare LLC, evaluated to worth $8 billion, in addition to paying off its $5 billion debt for a total of $13 billion. It is said to be merged with OptumInsight.
- August 2021: UnitedHealth Group announces acquisition of Solutran LLC.
- May 2022: Optum acquires Atrius Health, an independent physician-led healthcare organization.
- June 2022: Bordeaux UK Holdings II Limited, an affiliate of Optum business acquires EMIS Health for a 49% premium on its closing share price.
- June 2023: Optum agreed to acquire Amedisys for $3.3 billion. As part of the agreement, Amedisys rejected a prior buyout offer from Option Care that it initially agreed to the previous month.
- August 2025: Optum acquires Holston Medical Group, a physician-owned healthcare organization with 200+ providers and 70+ locations primarily serving Northeast Tennessee and Southwest Virginia.

This Optum-UnitedHealth model of vertical integration is pointed to as having sparked a pattern of acquisition activity in the healthcare industry; most notably, mega-mergers between CVS-Aetna, Cigna-Express Scripts and Humana-Kindred.

"Vertical integration" has met with considerable pushback and claims of antitrust law violations. The Federal Trade Commission (FTC) has accused major pharmacy benefit managers (PBMs), including CVS Caremark and OptumRx, of engaging in anticompetitive practices that harm competition and raise drug prices, citing conflicts of interest and exclusivity provisions.

Similarly, the American Medical Association (AMA) has criticized the CVS-Aetna merger, arguing it undermines competition in pharmacy benefit management services, health insurance, and retail pharmacy markets, leading to higher consumer costs and fewer choices. Ana Gupte, managing director of healthcare services at Leerink, said Optum's approach to acquisitions inspired the Aetna-CVS deal in an interview with Healthcare Dive.

ScriptSwitch Ltd, a software provider acquired by UnitedHealth UK for a reported £50m in 2009, was branded as "ScriptSwitch, provided by Optum" as of 2026.

=== Leadership timeline ===
- July 2011: Larry Renfro is named the first chief executive officer of Optum.
- July 2018: Andrew Witty succeeded Renfro as chief executive officer of Optum.
- April 2021 – June 2023: Witty stepped down as Optum's chief executive in April 2021, having been appointed CEO of parent company UnitedHealth Group earlier that year. With no direct successor being named, Optum transitioned to a devolved leadership structure headed by John Prince, who was named Optum's president and chief operating officer. In June 2023, Heather Cianfrocco succeeded Prince as Optum's president.
- April 2024: Cianfrocco is named chief executive officer of Optum.
- April 2025: Patrick H. Conway becomes chief executive officer of Optum.

== Controversies ==
=== Haven lawsuit ===
In early 2019, UnitedHealth Group filed a lawsuit asking a U.S. district judge to stop former Optum executive, David William Smith, from working at Haven (the Amazon, JP Morgan and Berkshire-Hathaway joint-healthcare venture). Optum argued that Haven is in direct competition with its business and as such, Smith's employment would be in violation of a noncompete agreement that he signed while with Optum. Smith, meanwhile, asked the judge to send the parties into closed-door arbitration. Wolf rejected Optum's request and allowed Smith's, putting court proceedings on hold until the arbitration process is complete.

The case garnered media attention as setting a precedent in trade secret litigation ahead of an anticipated wave of vertical integration in the healthcare industry and for uncovering previously unknown details about Haven. The case has also been referred to as having shed light on the threat that pharmacy benefit managers feel to bottom lines amid mounting bipartisan pressure to control rising healthcare costs. Testimony brought by Haven chief operating officer Jack Stoddard was unsealed after a motion brought by the parent companies of Stat News and The Wall Street Journal.

=== Alleged racial bias ===
A 2019 study published in Science, alleges the "algorithm used to manage the healthcare of millions of Americans shows dramatic biases against black patients". Said algorithm, applied to over 200 million individuals yearly, "significantly underestimates the amount of care black patients need compared with white patients". In fact, "less money is spent on black patients with the same level of need as white patients, causing the algorithm to conclude that black patients were less sick". Optum claims "its system helps 'clinicians provide more effective patient care every day'".
