= Diagnostic Health Corporation =

- Company type: Private
- Industry: Healthcare
- Founded: 2007
- Headquarters: Birmingham, Alabama, USA
- Products: Diagnostic Imaging
- Revenue: ▲$200 million USD (2006)
- Website: www.dxhealthcorp.com/

Diagnostic Health Corporation, based in Birmingham, Alabama, is one of the nation's largest independent diagnostic imaging companies. The company is the former diagnostic division of Encompass Health. The company has network of 53 free standing diagnostic imaging centers located in 19 states and the District of Columbia.
