= Doctor's visit =

Meeting between a patient and a physician

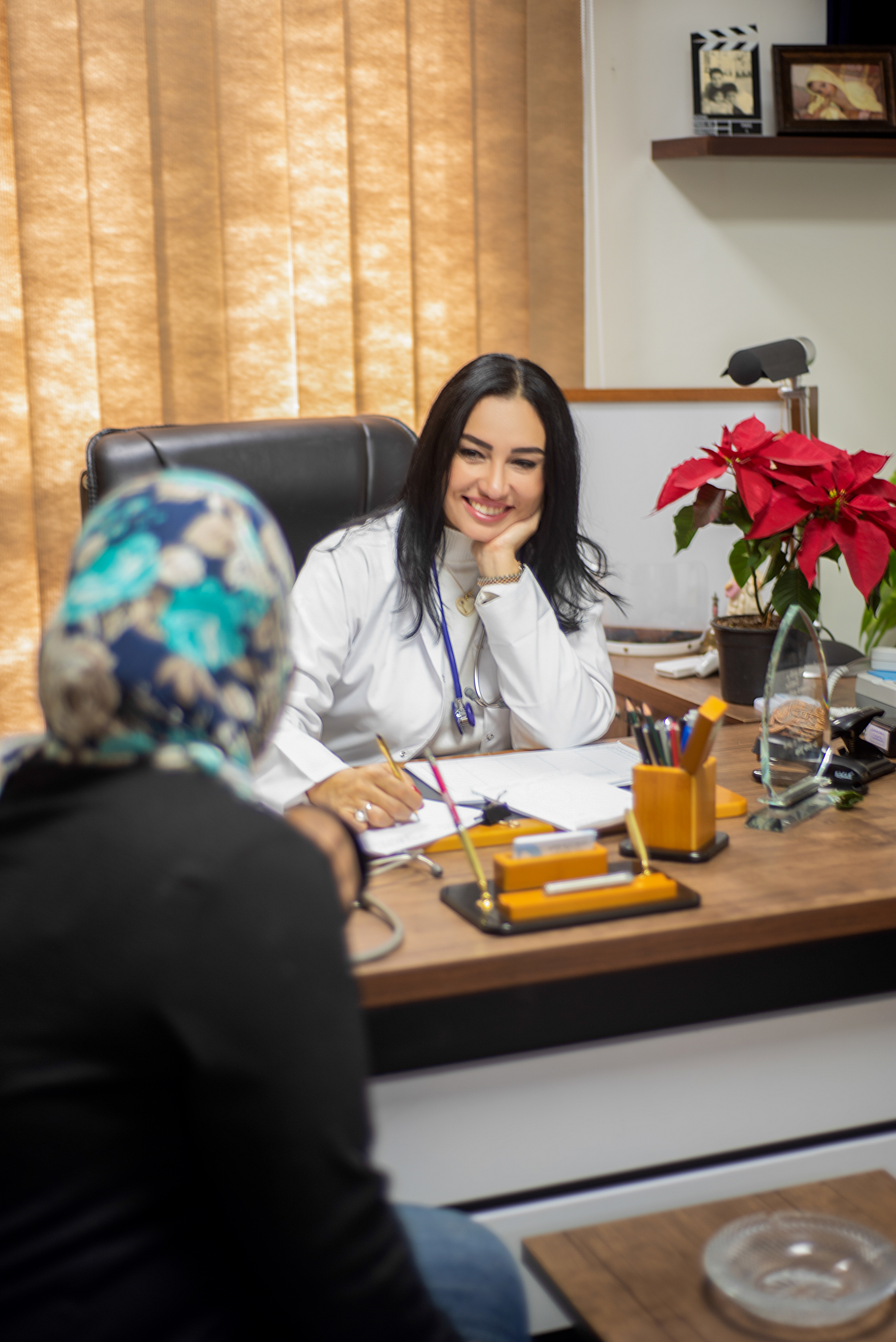
A doctor meeting with her patient in Egypt. Doctors develop a close relationship with their patients in order to build trust and better diagnose and treat disease.

A doctor's visit, also known as a physician office visit or a consultation, or a ward round in an inpatient care context, is a meeting between a patient with a physician to get health advice or treatment plan for a symptom or condition, most often at a professional health facility such as a doctor's office, clinic or hospital. According to a survey in the United States, a physician typically sees between 50 and 100 patients per week, but it may vary with medical specialty, but differs only little by community size such as metropolitan versus rural areas.

== Procedure ==
The four great cornerstones of diagnostic medicine are anatomy (structure: what is there), physiology (how the structure/s work), pathology (what goes wrong with the anatomy and physiology), and psychology (mind and behavior). In addition, the physician should consider the patient in their 'well' context rather than simply as a walking medical condition. This means the socio-political context of the patient (family, work, stress, beliefs) should be assessed as it often offers vital clues to the patient's condition and further management.

A patient typically presents a set of complaints (the symptoms) to the physician, who then performs a diagnostic procedure, which generally includes obtaining further information about the patient's symptoms, previous state of health, living conditions, and so forth. The physician then makes a review of systems (ROS) or systems inquiry, which is a set of ordered questions about each major body system in order: general (such as weight loss), endocrine, cardio-respiratory, etc. Next comes the actual physical examination and other medical tests; the findings are recorded, leading to a list of possible diagnoses. These will be investigated in order of probability.

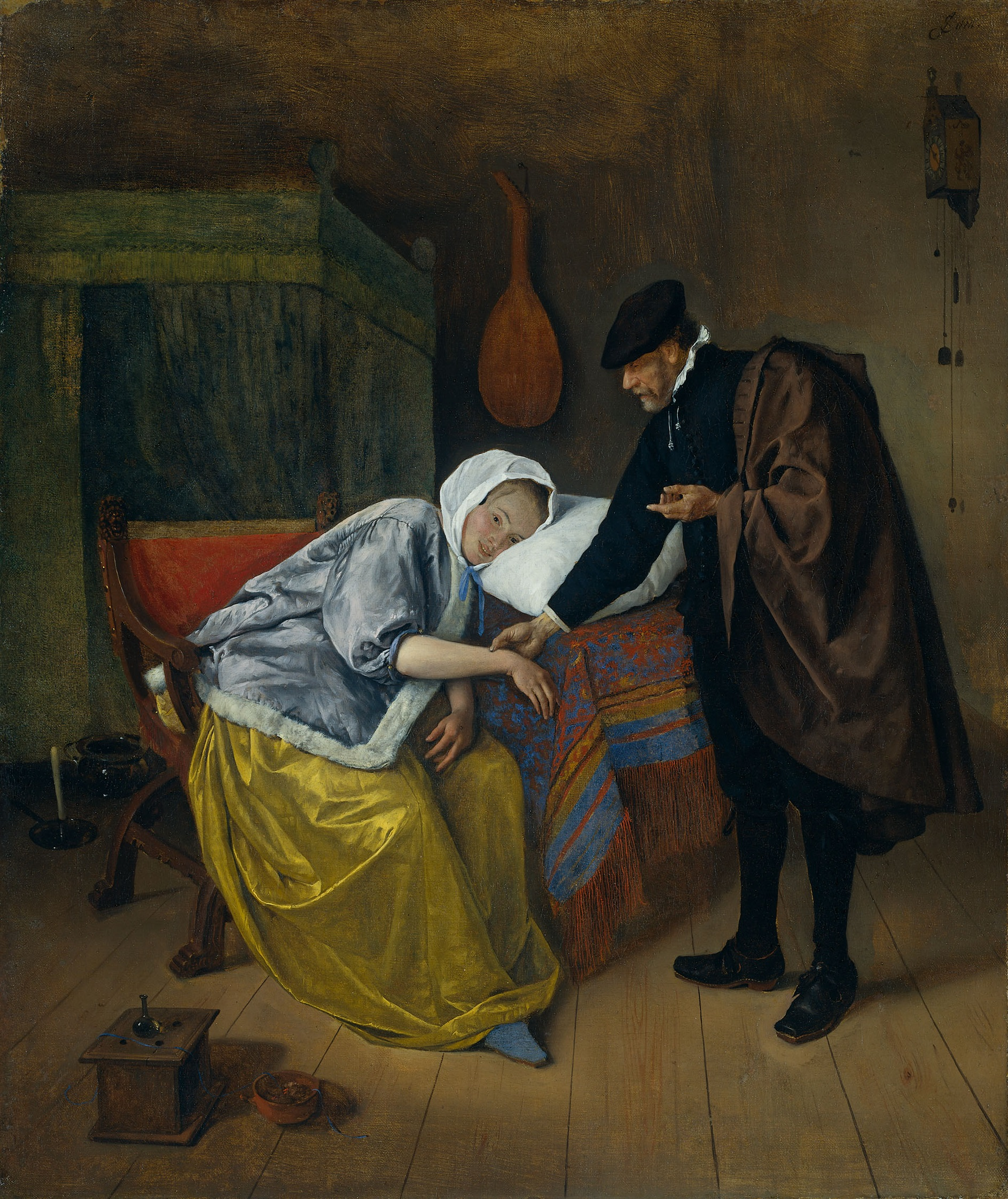
Jan Steen's The Doctor's Visit, c. 1663

The next task is to enlist the patient's agreement to a management plan, which will include treatment as well as plans for follow-up. Importantly, during this process the healthcare provider educates the patient about the causes, progression, outcomes, and possible treatments of his ailments, as well as often providing advice for maintaining health.

The physician's expertise comes from his knowledge of what is healthy and normal contrasted with knowledge and experience of other people who have had similar symptoms (unhealthy and abnormal), and the proven ability to relieve it with medicines (pharmacology) or other therapies about which the patient may initially have little knowledge.

== Duration ==
Time that doctors spend with a patient.

A survey in the United States came to the result that, overall, a physician sees each patient for 13 to 16 minutes. Anesthesiologists, neurologists, and radiologists spend more time with each patient, with 25 minutes or more. On the other hand, primary care physicians spend a median of 13 to 16 minutes per patient, whereas dermatologists and ophthalmologists spend the least time, with a median of 9 to 12 minutes per patient. Overall, female physicians spend more time with each patient than do male physicians.

For the patient, the time spent at the hospital can be substantially longer due to various waiting times, administrative steps or additional care from other health personnel. Regarding wait time, patients that are well informed of the necessary procedures in a clinical encounter, and the time it is expected to take, are generally more satisfied even if there is a longer waiting time.

== Web-based health care ==
With increasing access to computers and published online medical articles, the internet has increased the ability to perform self-diagnosis instead of going to a professional health care provider. Doctors may be fearful of misleading information and being inundated by emails from patients which take time to read and respond to (time for which they are not paid). About three-quarters of the U.S. population reports having a primary care physician, but the Primary Care Assessment Survey found "a significant erosion" in the quality of primary care from 1996 to 2000, most notably in the interpersonal treatment and thoroughness of physical examinations.

== Research and development ==
=== Analysis ===
A study systematically assessed advice given by professional general practitioners, typically in the form of verbal-only consultation, for weight-loss to obese patients. They found it rarely included effective methods, was mostly generic, and was rarely tailored to patients' existing knowledge and behaviours.

The National Institute on Aging has produced a list of "Tips for Talking With Your Doctor" that includes asking "if your doctor has any brochures, fact sheets, DVDs, CDs, cassettes, or videotapes about your health conditions or treatments" – for example if a patient's blood pressure was found to be high, the patient could get "brochures explaining what causes high blood pressure and what [the person] can do about it".

=== Virtual doctor's visit ===
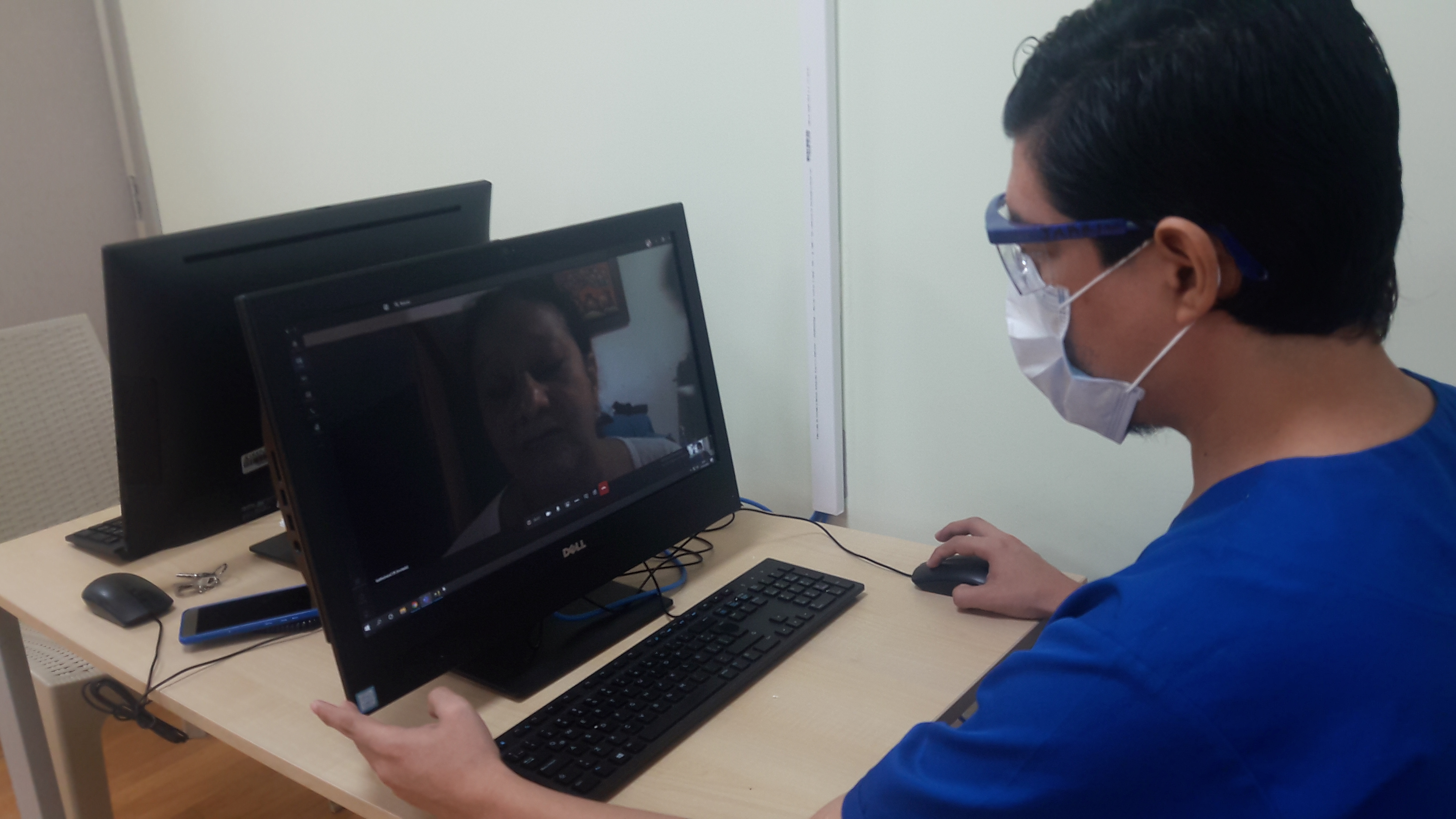
Telehealth

Telehealth is the use of electronic information and telecommunication technologies to support long-distance clinical health care, patient and professional health-related education, health administration, and public health. This includes data sharing by way of patient portals and electronic medical records. Telehealth encompasses a broad range of technologies and services used to provide patient care, health education, public health services, and health administration remotely using telecommunications technologies.

Telemedicine is sometimes used as a synonym but is actually a subset of telehealth. The Federation of State Medical Boards defines telemedicine as "the practice of medicine using electronic communication, information technology, or other means between a physician in one location, and a patient in another location, with or without an intervening health care provider." When rural settings, lack of transport, a lack of mobility, conditions due to outbreaks, epidemics or pandemics, decreased funding, or a lack of staff restrict access to care, telemedicine may bridge the gap and can even improve retention in treatment as well as provide distance-learning; meetings, supervision, and presentations between practitioners; online information and health data management and healthcare system integration. EHealth encompasses a wide range of applications, including but not limited to the following:

- Two clinicians discussing a case via video conference;
- Robotic surgery performed through remote access;
- Physical therapy conducted using digital monitoring instruments, live feed, and application combinations;
- Diagnostic tests transferred between facilities for interpretation by a higher specialist;
- Home monitoring through continuous transmission of patient health data;
- Online consultations between patients and practitioners;
- Video remote interpretation services for clinical visits.

A scientific review indicates that, in general, outcomes of telemedicine are or can be as good as in-person care with health care use staying similar.

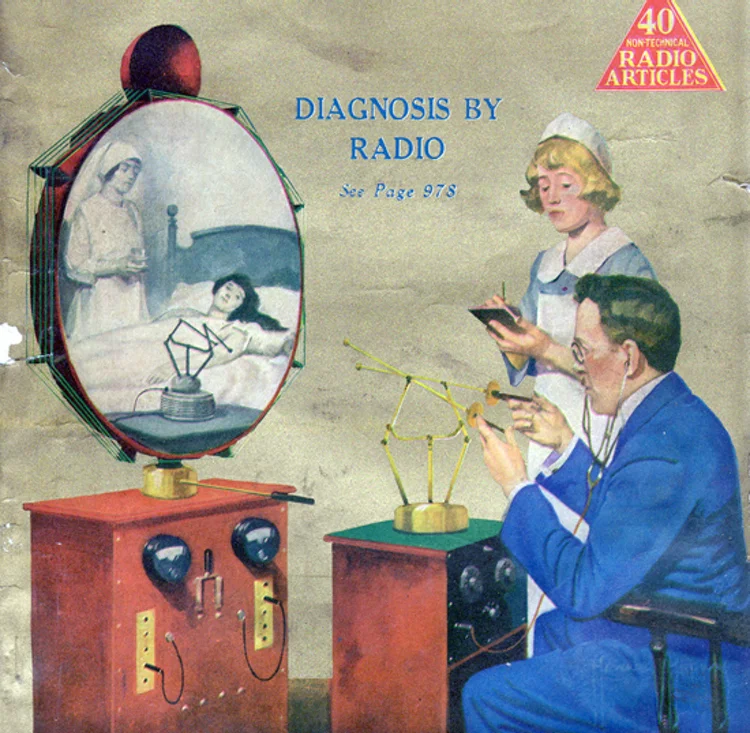
Telemedicine as predicted in 1925

Advantages of the nonexclusive adoption of already existing telemedicine technologies such as smartphone videotelephony may include reduced infection risks, increased control of disease during epidemic conditions, improved access to care, reduced stress and exposure to other pathogens during illness for better recovery, reduced time and labor costs, efficient more accessible matching of patients with particular symptoms and clinicians who are experts for such, and reduced travel while disadvantages may include privacy breaches (e.g. due to software backdoors and vulnerabilities or sale of data), dependability on Internet access and, depending on various factors, increased health care use.

=== Software and health records ===
Electronic medical records could also be studied to quantify disease burdens – such as the number of deaths from antimicrobial resistance – or help identify causes of, factors of, links between, and contributors to diseases, especially when combined with genome-wide association studies.

This may enable increased flexibility, improved disease surveillance, better medical product safety surveillance, better public health monitoring (such as for evaluation of health policy effectiveness), increased quality of care (via guidelines and improved medical history sharing), and novel life-saving treatments.

== See also ==
- House call
- Doctor-patient relationship
- General medical examination
