= NxStage =

NxStage Medical, Inc.
- Type: Subsidiary
- Industry: Medical devices
- Founded: December 1998; 27 years ago
- Founder: C. David Finch, Jr., MD and Jeffrey H. Burbank
- Headquarters: Lawrence, Massachusetts, U.S.
- Products: System One
- Revenue: ▲$393 million (2017)
- Net income: ▲ -$14 million (2017)
- Total assets: ▲$325 million (2017)
- Total equity: ▲$213 million (2017)
- Number of employees: 3,800 (2017)
- Parent: Fresenius Medical Care
- Website: www.nxstage.com

NxStage Medical, Inc. (/ˈnɛkˌsteɪdʒ/ NEK-stayj) is an American company that develops, manufactures, and markets systems for the treatment of chronic kidney disease, acute kidney injury, and hypervolemia. It is a subsidiary of Fresenius Medical Care. System One, a portable hemodialysis system, is the company's primary product.

== History ==
The company was founded by C. David Finch, Jr., MD and Jeffrey H. Burbank in December 1998.

In 2003, the company launched System One in the critical care market. It received Food and Drug Administration clearance for home hemodialysis in June 2005.

In October 2005, the company became a public company via an initial public offering.

On November 2, 2005, the company received the Nixon Peabody/Smith&Nephew Medical Device Innovation Award in the Start-Up category from the Massachusetts Medical Device Industry Council (MassMEDIC).

In December 2014, the company received Food and Drug Administration clearance for System One to be used overnight while patients are sleeping.

In August 2017, the company received Food and Drug Administration clearance for System One for solo home hemodialysis, without a care partner, during waking hours.

In February 2019, the company was acquired by Fresenius Medical Care.
