= HCentive =

hCentive, Inc.
- Company type: Private
- Industry: Software development
- Founded: 2009
- Founders: Sanjay Singh; Manoj Agarwala; Tarun Upaday
- Headquarters: Reston, Virginia, United States
- Number of locations: New York, Colorado, Pennsylvania and Noida, India (R&D center)
- Area served: United States
- Key people: Sanjay Singh (CEO)
- Products: Software for health insurance marketplaces
- Number of employees: 500+
- Parent: UnitedHealth Group (Optum)
- Website: www.hcentive.com

hCentive, Inc. is a software company based in Reston, Virginia, known for developing cloud-based products for health insurers and state agencies involved with health insurance marketplaces.

As of December 31, 2018, hCentive, Inc. was listed among UnitedHealth Group’s subsidiaries, indicating that the company had been integrated into UHG’s Optum business by that time.

== History ==
hCentive was founded in 2009 by Sanjay Singh, Manoj Agarwala and Tarun Upaday. The company expanded alongside the rollout of the Affordable Care Act.

In 2013, media reported that approximately 125 employees worked at the corporate headquarters, with additional staff at the Noida R&D center.

In 2022, Hcentive Technology India Pvt Ltd was amalgamated into Optum Global Solutions Pvt Ltd, alongside other Optum entities, under an NCLT Hyderabad order.

== Products and services ==
The company developed software used by state-based health insurance marketplaces. Its WebInsure State platform was used by exchanges in New York, Colorado and Kentucky.

For private markets, the company offered WebInsure Private Exchange and WebInsure Exchange Manager for integration between plans, third-party administrators and related parties.

In June 2014, the Massachusetts Health Connector selected Optum as systems integrator to implement an off-the-shelf exchange platform, customizing software from hCentive, with the goal of restoring functionality for the November 2014 open enrollment period.

== Awards and rankings ==
The company was ranked No. 62 on Deloitte Technology Fast 500 (2016), No. 117 on the Inc. 5000 (2014), and No. 12 on the Washington Business Journal Fast 50 (2015).
