= Fresenius Medical Care =

German medical supply and dialysis company

Fresenius Medical Care AG & Co. KGaA
- Type: KGaA with Aktiengesellschaft as partner with unlimited liability
- Traded as: FWB: FME; FWB: FMEA (ADR); OTCID Basic Current: FMCQF; NYSE: FMS (ADR); DAX component (FME)
- ISIN: DE0005785802; US3580291066
- Industry: Health care
- Founded: 1996; 30 years ago
- Headquarters: Bad Homburg vor der Höhe, Germany Waltham, Massachusetts
- Key people: Helen Giza (CEO, Chair of the management board and acting CFO); Dieter Schenk (Chairman of the supervisory board)
- Products: Dialysis products and services, Therapeutic Apheresis Products
- Revenue: €19.40 billion (2022)
- Operating income: €1.51 billion (2022)
- Net income: €0.67 billion (2022)
- Total assets: €34,367 million (2021)
- Total equity: €13,979 million (2021)
- Owner: Fresenius (32%)
- Number of employees: 128,000 (2022)
- Website: www.freseniusmedicalcare.com/en/home/

Fresenius Medical Care AG & Co. KGaA is a German healthcare company which provides kidney dialysis services through a network of 4,171 outpatient dialysis centers, serving 345,425 patients. The company primarily treats end-stage renal disease (ESRD), which requires patients to undergo dialysis 3 times per week for the rest of their lives.

With a global headquarters in Bad Homburg vor der Höhe, Germany, and a North American headquarters in Waltham, Massachusetts, it has a 38% market share of the dialysis market in the United States. It also operates 42 production sites, the largest of which are in the U.S., Germany, and Japan.

The company is 32% owned by Fresenius and, as of 2020, generates around 50% of the group's revenue.

As of 2024, the company was ranked as #612 on the World's Best Employers list published by Forbes.

== History ==
In 1996, Fresenius SE & Co. KGaA merged its dialysis business into W.R. Grace's National Medical Care to form Fresenius Medical Care.

In 2000, the company pleaded guilty to billing Medicare for unnecessary medical tests and to paying kickbacks for lab business and paid a $486 million fine.

In February 2012, the company acquired Liberty Dialysis Holding, which added 201 clinics, for $1.5 billion.

In March 2012, Rice Powell was appointed CEO.

In 2013, the company acquired Shiel Medical Laboratory, expanding services to New York City metro area. In December 2017, the company sold this business to Quest Diagnostics.

In February 2019, the company acquired NxStage, a U.S.-based maker of in-home dialysis devices, for $2 billion.

== Legal issues ==
In March 2019, the company paid $231 million to the United States Department of Justice and the U.S. Securities and Exchange Commission to settle allegations of civil bribery to obtain business in 13 countries, including Angola, Saudi Arabia, Morocco, and Spain. As part of the settlement the company agreed to retain an independent corporate compliance monitor for at least two years. In March 2023, the company was certified by the monitor that its compliance program is reasonably designed and implemented to detect and prevent violations of the U.S. Foreign Corrupt Practices Act (FCPA). The certification was accepted by the U.S. Securities and Exchange Commission and the United States Department of Justice.

In July 2022, the US Department of Justice joined a civil lawsuit against Fresenius Medical Care, alleging that a unit of the company, Fresenius Vascular Care, violated the federal False Claims Act and engaged in fraud by performing unnecessary procedures on dialysis patients that "exposed patients to grave risks" and then billing Medicare and other insurance providers for them from January 2012 to June 2018. The lawsuit includes 19 US states and was originally filed in 2014 in New York.

In 2024, the Federal Trade Commission began investigating Fresenius Medical Care along with DaVita under allegations they use illegal tactics to push smaller companies out of the market.

In May 2025, the benefits fund of the United Food and Commercial Workers Local 1776 filed a proposed class-action lawsuit against Fresenius Medical Care and DaVita Inc., another dialysis provider, alleging that the two companies illegally conspired to inflate treatment costs for dialysis patients by billions of dollars.
