= Richard Scrushy =

American businessman and convicted felon

- Born: Richard Marin Scrushy; August 1952 (age 74); Selma, Alabama, U.S.
- Occupations: Businessman founder and former chairman and chief executive officer of HealthSouth Corporation, former chairman and chief executive officer of MedPartners, Inc.
- Spouse(s): Debbie Cody (197?–197?); Karon Brooks (1978–1996); Leslie Anne Jones (1997–present)
- Status: Released
- Criminal charges: Birmingham trial: 36 charges of fraud, false corporate reportings, and making false statements Not Guilty; Montgomery trial: bribery and mail fraud Guilty
- Penalty: Birmingham trial: acquitted Montgomery trial: 82 months in federal prison, three years' probation, United States Dollars $267,000 in restitution, a fine of $150,000 and 500 hours of community service

Richard Marin Scrushy (born August 1952) is an American businessman and convicted criminal. He is the founder of HealthSouth Corporation, a global healthcare company based in Birmingham, Alabama. In 2004, following an investigation by the Federal Bureau of Investigation (FBI), Scrushy was criminally charged by the U.S. Securities and Exchange Commission (SEC). Scrushy was charged with 36 of the original 85 counts but was acquitted of all charges on June 28, 2005, after a jury trial in Birmingham.

Four months after his acquittal in Birmingham, on October 28, 2005, Scrushy was indicted by a federal grand jury in Montgomery, Alabama, along with former Alabama Governor Don Siegelman. The indictment included 30 counts of money laundering, extortion, obstruction of justice, racketeering, and bribery. Although the new charges were filed a month before the previous trial ended, Scrushy's attorneys accused prosecutors of filing charges as retaliation for Scrushy's acquittal. Scrushy pleaded not guilty to all charges, but was convicted along with Siegelman in June 2006.

On May 7, 2009, Scrushy was transferred from the Texas jail where he had been incarcerated and placed in the custody of the Shelby County Jail in Columbiana, Alabama. Scrushy was returned to Alabama in order to testify in a new civil trial in the Jefferson County Circuit Court brought against him by shareholders of HealthSouth who sought damages related to Scrushy's trial and conviction. On June 18, 2009, Judge Allwin E. Horn ruled that Scrushy was responsible for HealthSouth's fraud, and ordered him to pay $2.87 billion. On July 25, 2012, Scrushy was released from federal custody.

== Early life and background ==
Richard M. Scrushy was born in August 1952 in Selma, Alabama. The son of a middle-class family, his father, Gerald Scrushy, worked as a cash register repairman and his mother, Grace Scrushy, worked as a nurse and respiratory therapist. At an early age, Scrushy taught himself to play the piano and guitar and was earning money doing odd jobs by the time he was twelve years old. Scrushy, who then went by his middle name Marin, attended school until he was 17. He dropped out prior to graduating from Parrish High School and married.

Scrushy soon found himself living in a Selma trailer park and working manual labor jobs to support his family. After a run-in with a boss, Scrushy quit his job hauling cement and decided to return to school. He earned his GED and, at his mother's advice, began studying respiratory therapy at Wallace State Community College. After a year at Wallace State, Scrushy transferred to Jefferson State Community College and later entered the respiratory therapy program at the University of Alabama at Birmingham (UAB). Upon graduating from UAB's program, Scrushy was offered a position teaching at the university, where he was promoted to director during his two-and-a-half-year tenure. Scrushy divorced his wife, with whom he had two children, and took a position teaching at the Wallace State campus in Dothan. There, Scrushy met and married his second wife, Karen Brooks. The two had four children before they divorced in 1996.

In early June 1997, Scrushy married Leslie Anne Jones in Jamaica, with guests such as Martha Stewart attending. The group met at the HealthSouth Hangar at the Birmingham International Airport and boarded a chartered Boeing 727 to Jamaica. Together Richard and Leslie have had three children.

== Career and HealthSouth ==
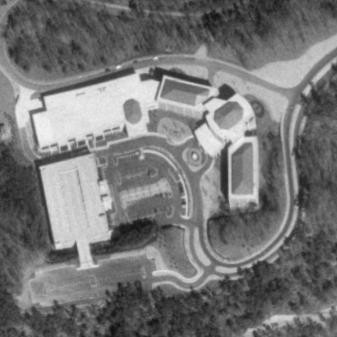
The headquarters of HealthSouth Corporation in Birmingham, Alabama

In the late 1970s, following his time teaching at UAB and Wallace State, Scrushy was offered a position with Lifemark Corporation, a Houston, Texas-based health care company. Within a few years of being hired at Lifemark, Scrushy was part of a $100 million operation that included the pharmacy, physical rehabilitation, and hospital acquisition divisions. While working for Lifemark, Scrushy moved to St. Louis, Missouri, where he worked as the regional director of the respiratory therapy division. He then moved to Houston where he became the company's chief operating officer.

Still working for Lifemark, Scrushy devised a plan for an outpatient diagnostics and rehabilitative health clinic chain. He presented the plan to Lifemark, but the company was unable to act on it due to a company merger that was already underway with American Medical International. Scrushy left Lifemark in 1983 and founded Amcare, Inc within a year. The new company opened its first facility in Little Rock, Arkansas, and had initial capital between $50,000-$70,000. With the assistance of four partners from Amcare Inc. and a one million dollar investment by Citicorp Venture Capital, Scrushy took the quickly growing company and founded HealthSouth Corporation in 1984. Two years after its founding, HealthSouth became a publicly traded company. The next year, HealthSouth expanded into two new fields, worker's compensation and sports medicine, allowing the company to double its earnings and obtain assets close to $100 million. By the early 1990s, the company had expanded even more, with facilities in each of the 50 U.S. states and revenues in excess of $181 million.

Over the next decade, HealthSouth's sports medicine programs received international attention by being linked to star athletes including Bo Jackson, who served as the president of HealthSouth's Sports Medicine Council; Roger Clemens; Jack Nicklaus, Kyle Petty; Michael Jordan; Shaquille O'Neal, and Lúcio Carlos Cajueiro Souza. Scrushy even allowed Jordan to stay free during the summer and fall of 1994 in a secondary house he owned in Greystone Golf and Country Club when Jordan played for the Birmingham Barons.

At its height, HealthSouth employed more than 50,000 physicians, was the "nation's largest provider of outpatient surgery and rehabilitative and diagnostic healthcare services", and had over 2,000 facilities in the United States, Puerto Rico, Australia, and the United Kingdom. HealthSouth facilities worldwide saw more than 120,000 patients daily, and with earnings around $106 million in 1997, Scrushy was the third-highest-paid CEO in the U.S.

== Legal battles ==
Although HealthSouth grew tremendously throughout the 1990s, becoming the largest comprehensive rehabilitative services company in the U.S., ethical and financial questions began to arise as early as 1989. An internal auditor alleged that he was fired for drawing attention to HealthSouth's financial problems and that he was pressured to meet certain earnings targets. Two years later, in 1991, HealthSouth was accused by Medicare of illegally adding costs to reports for outpatient physical therapy and inpatient rehabilitation admissions at the corporation's Bakersfield Rehabilitation Hospital. In 1998, Medicare changed its funding arrangements in an attempt to reduce exploitation and payments by $100 billion. Scrushy insisted that the change would not affect HealthSouth's bottom line but profits dropped by 93 percent by the end of the year. Around this same time, HealthSouth began facing additional accusations of fraud. An investigation by the insurance company Blue Cross and Blue Shield of Alabama determined that HealthSouth had "improperly billed Medicare for therapy by students, interns and other unlicensed aides".

Additional lawsuits alleged HealthSouth had committed widespread abuse of Medicare by "billing for services it never provided, delivering poor care, treating patients without a formal plan of care, and using unlicensed therapists". In March 2003, the U.S. Securities and Exchange Commission (SEC) filed a civil suit against Scrushy and HealthSouth alleging the company had falsified at least $2.7 billion worth of profit between 1996 and 2002. HealthSouth agreed to pay the United States government $325 million on December 30, 2004, in order to "settle allegations that the company defrauded Medicare and other federal healthcare programs".

=== Birmingham criminal trial ===
United States of America v. Richard M. Scrushy, a 36-page indictment

On February 6, 2003, the Federal Bureau of Investigation (FBI) announced that it had begun a criminal investigation relating to the "trading of shares of the HealthSouth Corporation" and possible securities law violations. A criminal complaint was filed by the FBI against HealthSouth's chief financial officer, Weston Smith, and civil charges were brought against Scrushy by the SEC. Scrushy became the first CEO to be tried under the Sarbanes–Oxley Act when he was indicted by the U.S. Department of Justice in United States of America v. Richard M. Scrushy on November 4, 2003.

Scrushy's initial charges included 85 counts of conspiracy, money laundering, securities fraud, and mail fraud, but he was ultimately indicted with just 36 counts. In the indictment, Scrushy was accused of using intimidation, threats, and cash payments to coerce top HealthSouth executives into committing fraud. These top executives called themselves "The Family" and referred to their creative accounting as "filling the gap". The group attempted to hide the false earnings by illegally inflating balances of accounts such as fixed assets and estimated insurance reimbursements. Despite multiple chief executives testifying against Scrushy, prosecutors were unable to produce any material evidence that he had been involved in the fraudulent accounting.

During the trial, Scrushy defended himself both inside and outside the courtroom. Scrushy was interviewed by Mike Wallace for a 60 Minutes segment called "Cooking The Books", began hosting a Christian television show with his wife called Viewpoint, backed a citywide 40-day prayer movement referred to as "City, thou art loosed", and joined the predominantly African-American Guiding Light Church. These actions were seen as an attempt to sway potential jurors, since 70 percent of Birmingham's population, and eleven of the eighteen jurors, were African American. Following more than a month of deliberations, Scrushy was acquitted of all charges on June 28, 2005.

=== Montgomery criminal trial ===
On October 26, 2005, four months after his acquittal in Birmingham, Scrushy was indicted by a federal grand jury in Montgomery. The indictment included 30 counts of racketeering, money laundering, extortion, obstruction of justice, and bribery of Alabama Governor Don Siegelman. Prosecutors claimed that Scrushy had agreed to pay over $500,000 of Siegelman's debt, which he accumulated during a failed attempt to bring a state lottery to Alabama, in exchange for a seat on the Certificates of Need Review Board. The board serves the state by reviewing hospitals and approving their construction. Although the new charges were filed a month before the previous trial ended, Scrushy's attorneys accused prosecutors of filing charges as retaliation for Scrushy's acquittal. Scrushy and Siegelman pleaded not guilty to all charges, but they were both convicted following a trial that lasted approximately six weeks. Scrushy was convicted of bribery, conspiracy, and mail fraud, while Siegelman was convicted of bribery, conspiracy, mail fraud, and obstruction of justice.

While awaiting sentencing, on March 29, 2007, Scrushy's probation officer filed a report claiming that Scrushy had violated the conditions of his bond by leaving Walt Disney World in Orlando, Florida and traveling to Palm Beach, where he boarded a yacht and sailed to Miami. The probation officer suggested that Scrushy should be placed under house arrest and that he be required to wear an electronic monitoring device at all times. United States Magistrate Judge Charles Coody warned Scrushy that he "would not tolerate any future deviations from the requirements the court has placed on" him and ruled that Scrushy must wear a GPS tracking device anytime he travels outside of Alabama.

On June 28, 2007, Scrushy was sentenced to six years and ten months in a federal prison, ordered to pay $267,000 in restitution to United Way of Alabama, three years' probation, and a fine of $150,000. Scrushy is also expected to personally pay for his time in prison and perform 500 hours of community service. Siegelman was sentenced on the same day to seven years and four months in prison, restitution of $181,325 to the state, three years' probation, a $50,000 fine, and 500 hours of community service upon his release. U.S. District Judge Mark Fuller would later rule, however, that Sieglman would not be required to pay the $181,325 in restitution. The restitution was based on debts accumulated by the State of Alabama during a fraudulent warehouse deal, but Siegelman was acquitted on charges related to the deal. Upon sentencing, Scrushy and Siegelman were taken into custody and transported to a federal prison in Atlanta, Georgia, where they briefly shared a cell.

=== Appeal ===
Following the trial and conviction, Scrushy, Siegelman, and the prosecutors all indicated they would appeal. Scrushy and Siegelman vowed to appeal their convictions and sentences, while the prosecution announced its desire to appeal a judge's decision to remove charges of perjury from Scrushy's indictment. Prosecutors quickly dropped their appeal, and U.S. Attorney Alice Martin indicated they had reconsidered.

Awaiting appeal, Scrushy was briefly transported to a transfer site for inmates in Oklahoma City before being sent to his permanent location at a low-security federal prison in Beaumont, Texas. Scrushy filed a request with the 11th U.S. Circuit Court of Appeals, asking to be released on appeal bond. The 11th US Circuit Court of Appeals rejected Scrushy's request to be released on bond, citing an earlier ruling written by U.S. District Judge Mark Fuller. The ruling was issued while Scrushy was on bond awaiting sentencing, and deemed him a flight risk. Scrushy again filed for release in February and May 2008 but both requests were denied.

In March 2009, a panel of three judges from the 11th U.S. Circuit Court upheld all charges against Scrushy and dismissed two of the seven charges against Siegelman. A further appeal for a full court review of the case was also denied by the 11th U.S. Circuit Court of Appeals on May 15, 2009. Scrushy appealed to the U.S. Supreme Court. On June 29, 2010, the Supreme Court issued an order directing the appeals court to review the case in light of their (Supreme Court's) ruling the previous week on the "honest services" fraud statute. On June 4, 2012, the Supreme Court rejected Scrushy's appeal, allowing his public corruption and bribery convictions to stand.

=== Birmingham civil trial ===
Scrushy was returned to Alabama on May 7, 2009, in order to testify in a new civil trial in a Birmingham court. Former HealthSouth investors had sued him seeking recompense for money lost due to the fraud of which Scrushy was acquitted in 2005. While opposing counsel claimed Scrushy was a "hands-on manager who treated the company as a personal piggy bank," he continued to assign blame to his subordinates and maintain that he did nothing wrong. Closing arguments were heard in the trial on May 27, 2009. On June 18, 2009, Judge Horn ordered Scrushy to pay $2.87 billion in damages. Judge Horn stated, "Scrushy knew of and actively participated in the fraud" and referred to Scrushy as the "CEO of the fraud". As expected, Scrushy appealed the judgment to the Alabama Supreme Court. On January 28, 2011, Scrushy lost his appeal of the civil verdict.

=== Release ===
According to the Federal Bureau of Prisons website, the 59-year-old Scrushy was moved in April 2012 from the federal prison in Beaumont, Texas into the supervision of the community corrections management field office in San Antonio. Following his move to a halfway house, Scrushy was moved to home confinement, and then, on July 25, 2012, was released from federal custody.

== Later career and activities ==
Following his release from federal custody in 2012, Scrushy returned to business life as a consultant, advisor and speaker, focusing on entrepreneurship, leadership and corporate governance. He has written and promoted books including When Building a Billion Dollar Company, which discusses entrepreneurial growth and risk management, and It Should Not Happen in America: From Selma to Wall Street—A Journey of Fire and Faith, a memoir that describes his upbringing, business career and views on the legal proceedings that affected him and HealthSouth.

Scrushy has continued to speak at conferences and events on topics such as small-business development, financial controls and lessons from corporate crises, and he has launched media projects including an entrepreneurial podcast and online content aimed at early-stage business owners. Public profiles describe him as working with small businesses and advisory clients in Texas and other states while remaining connected to Alabama through family, church and civic engagements.

== See also ==
- List of corporate collapses and scandals
- Enron scandal
