= SCA Health =

Outpatient surgery operator in Alabama, United States

- Type: Subsidiary of Optum
- Industry: Healthcare
- Predecessor: HealthSouth Outpatient Surgery Division
- Founded: 2007
- Headquarters: Birmingham, Alabama,
- Number of locations: 370 (2025)
- Key people: Jason Strauss, CEO
- Products: Ambulatory Surgery Centers and Surgical Hospitals
- Revenue: ▲$5.0 billion USD (2024)
- Number of employees: 11,300 (2024)
- Parent: Optum
- Website: sca.health

SCA Health (SCA), based in Birmingham, Alabama, is an operator of outpatient surgery facilities with a network of over 370 ambulatory surgery centers (ASCs) in 35 states performing more than 1 million outpatient surgery procedures a year.

SCA's mission is to create partnerships between health plans, physician groups, and health systems, to acquire, develop and optimize surgical facilities. SCA's 9,200 affiliated physicians provide a range of surgical services. The company has been a part of Optum since March 2017.

== History ==
The original Surgical Care Affiliates was founded in 1982 by Joel Gordon in Nashville, Tennessee. Gordon had previously founded General Care Corp (NYSE: GCE) in 1969, a hospital company that was sold to Hospital Corporation of America (“HCA”) in 1980. Subsequent to selling General Care Corp to HCA, Gordon partnered with Andrew “Woody” Miller, an HCA executive, and Jack Massey, a co-founder of HCA and American venture capitalist, to launch SCA. SCA raised capital by listing shares on the New York Stock Exchange and used the proceeds to acquire existing surgery centers and build new surgery centers, mostly in the southeast. From 1982 to 1995, SCA grew to approximately 67 facilities.

HealthSouth announced it would acquire SCA in October 1995 for $1.2 billion. After the acquisition closed in early 1996, HealthSouth consolidated SCA's Nashville office into its outpatient surgery division office in Birmingham, Alabama. The SCA acquisition, along with several previous surgery center company acquisitions, made HealthSouth the nation's largest provider of outpatient surgery with a total of 126 surgery centers. HealthSouth continued to grow the business by acquiring other surgery center companies, including ASC Network Corp and National Surgery Centers, and independent facilities during this period, eventually growing the division to over 200 facilities in 37 states. In March 2007, HealthSouth announced an agreement to sell its surgery center division to TPG Capital (TPG), a large private equity firm, while retaining an equity interest in the new company.

TPG Capital completed its acquisition of HealthSouth’s surgery division in June 2007, effectively forming SCA as a new, stand-alone company. The company was named Surgical Care Affiliates, in recognition of the original SCA, and remained headquartered in Birmingham. HealthSouth's chief operating officer, Mike Snow, stepped in as SCA's first chief executive officer but left the company a year later to become the CEO of Wellmont Health Systems. In May 2008, Andrew Hayek was hired as president and chief executive officer. Hayek had previously been president of a division of DaVita Healthcare Partners (now Optum) and had been president and chief operating officer of Alliance Healthcare Services.

In October 2013, the company issued an IPO.

In January 2021, the company was indicted by a federal grand jury on charges of labor market collusion. According to the Department of Justice, "Beginning at least as early as May 2010 and continuing until at least as late as October 2017, SCA conspired with a company based in Texas to allocate senior-level employees by agreeing not to solicit each other’s senior-level employees. Beginning at least as early as February 2012 and continuing until at least as late as July 2017, SCA separately conspired with a company based in Colorado to allocate senior-level employees through a similar non-solicitation agreement." In July 2021, the Colorado company was identified by the Department of Justice as DaVita Inc.

In May 2022, the company rebranded from Surgical Care Affiliates to SCA Health.

== Partnerships ==
=== Texas Health Resources ===
In October 2012, SCA partnered with Texas Health Resources leadership to design and execute a surgical strategy in the Dallas / Fort Worth market. Together with community surgeons, the partnership has grown from two facilities to 25 facilities.

=== Monarch Healthcare ===
SCA is partnered with Monarch HealthCare, Orange County’s largest association of physicians in private practice. In 2011, Monarch HealthCare was acquired by Optum, UnitedHealth’s health services division. In February 2013, SCA entered into a joint venture partnership with Memorial Care Medical Foundation and Monarch HealthCare to optimize surgery in Southern California; the partnership now has 9 ASCs.

=== Advocate Health Care ===
In 2015, Advocate Health Care and SCA entered a joint venture to acquire and develop a surgery center network. Advocate Health Care was the largest fully integrated healthcare delivery system in the state of Illinois; the partnership currently has a total portfolio of 15 surgery centers, with more in development.

=== SwiftPath ===
In May 2016, SCA made an investment in SwiftPath, LLC, which develops evidence-based, rapid recovery protocols that enable surgeons to perform hip and knee replacements in an outpatient setting. The SwiftPath platform includes patient engagement and education, patient selection criteria, and peer-reviewed surgical techniques. SCA currently has 43 outpatient facilities performing total joint replacements.

== One World Surgery ==
SCA is the foundational corporate partner to the nonprofit One World Surgery. One World Surgery funds and operates an ambulatory surgery center located near Tegucigalpa, Honduras, on the grounds of a 2,000 acre orphanage (part of the Nuestros Pequeños Hermanos network) with more than 500 children.
