= Jay F. Grinney =

American health care executive (born 1951)

Jay Frederick Grinney
- Born: March 20, 1951 (age 75)
- Education: St. Olaf College (B.A.); Washington University in St. Louis (MHA, MBA)
- Occupation: Healthcare Executive
- Known for: President and chief executive officer of HealthSouth Corporation
- Spouses: Rebecca H. Grinney (19??-1987), Ellen Heath Grinney (div. 2005): Melanie Parker Grinney (2009-Present)
- Children: 3

Jay Frederick Grinney (born March 20, 1951) is an American health care executive who served as president and chief executive officer of Birmingham, Alabama-based HealthSouth Corporation from 2004 to 2016. He was appointed during a period of corporate restructuring following the company's 2003 accounting fraud disclosure and led the publicly traded health care provider through a period of strategic expansion. A graduate of St. Olaf College and Washington University in St. Louis, he previously held senior leadership roles at Hospital Corporation of America (HCA). HealthSouth later changed its corporate name to Encompass Health Corporation in 2018.

== Early life and education ==
Jay F. Grinney was born on March 20, 1951, in Milwaukee, Wisconsin, and was raised in Racine, Wisconsin. He graduated from St. Olaf College in 1973 and later earned both a Master of Health Administration and a Master of Business Administration from Washington University in St. Louis.

== Career ==
In 1981, Grinney joined Methodist Health Care System on a fellowship. In 1985, Grinney became the senior vice president TMH Services.

In 1990, Grinney joined HCA. He served as the president of the Houston Division of Columbia Hospital Corporation until 1994, when Columbia announced a merger with Nashville, Tennessee-based Hospital Corporation of America. He then continued as the president of HCA's Eastern Group.

In 2004, he was chosen by HealthSouth Corporation to serve as its president and chief executive officer. He served on boards of directors of HealthSouth Corporation, Energen Corporation, Coca-Cola Bottling Company United, the Birmingham Business Alliance's executive committee and its chairman's circle, the Birmingham Civil Rights Institute, and the Public Affairs Research Council of Alabama. He currently serves as an Industry Advisor to KKR's private equity healthcare practice and is the chairman of the board of Global Medical Response.

== Personal life ==
Grinney married his third wife, Melanie Parker Grinney in 2009. They reside in Mountain Brook, Alabama. Grinney has a son and two daughters from his first marriage.
