= DaVita =

American dialysis provider

DaVita Inc.
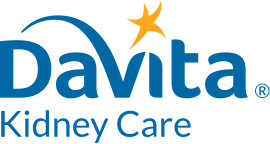

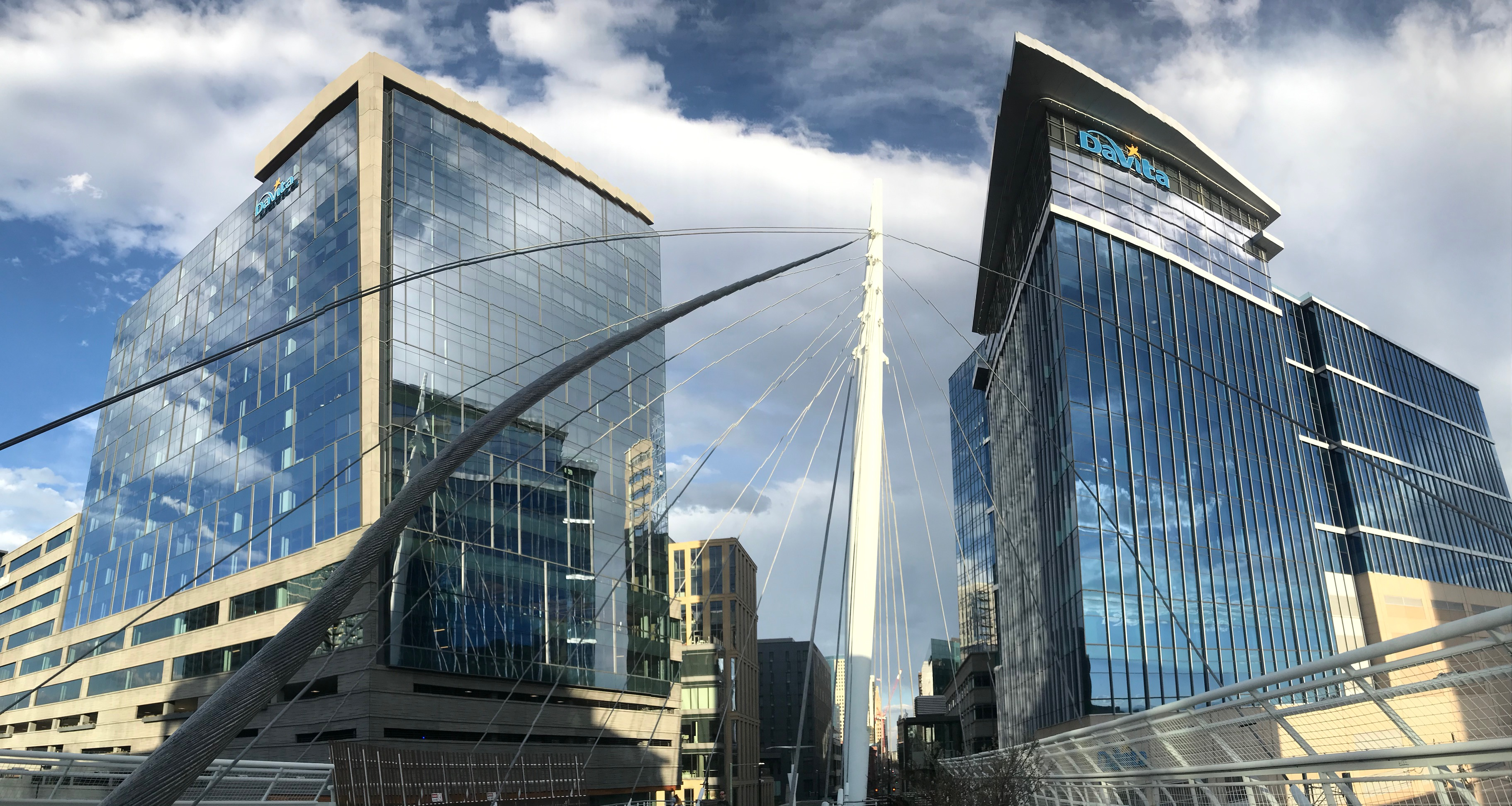
- Headquarters as seen from the Denver Millennium Bridge
- Type: Public
- Traded as: NYSE: DVA; S&P 500 component
- Industry: Healthcare
- Founded: 1992; 34 years ago
- Headquarters: Denver, Colorado, U.S.
- Key people: Javier J. Rodriguez (CEO)
- Services: Kidney dialysis
- Revenue: ▲US$13.653 billion (2025)
- Operating income: ▼US$2.043 billion (2025)
- Net income: ▼US$1.078 billion (2025)
- Total assets: ▲US$17.480 billion (2025)
- Total equity: ▼ -US$651 million (2025)
- Owner: Berkshire Hathaway (41.2%)
- Number of employees: 78,000 (2025)
- Website: davita.com

DaVita Inc. (a shortened contraction of "dare vita, meaning "to give life" in the Italian language) is an American health care company, incorporated in Delaware and headquartered in Denver, that provides kidney dialysis services through a network of 2,657 outpatient centers in the United States. DaVita serves 200,500 patients (36% of the total of 557,000 patients in the U.S.), and has 585 outpatient centers in 14 other countries serving 94,500 patients. The company primarily treats end-stage renal disease (ESRD), which requires patients to undergo kidney dialysis, often 3 times per week for the rest of their lives unless they receive a kidney transplant via organ donation.

In 2025, 68% of the company's revenues came from Medicare and other government-based health insurance programs. In 2025, 89% of the company's patients were covered by government-based health insurance programs. Commercial payers, which accounted for 32% of revenues in 2025, generate nearly all of the company's profit as they reimburse at a much higher rate than government-based health insurance programs. The company is ranked 331st on the 2026 Fortune 500.

== History ==
The company was founded in 1979 as Medical Ambulatory Care, Inc., a subsidiary of National Medical Enterprises, Inc. (now Tenet Healthcare).

In August 1994, 70% of the company was acquired by DLJ Merchant Banking Partners in a leveraged buyout for $75.5 million, including a $10.5 million investment by DLJ. The company then changed its name to Total Renal Care Holdings, Inc. In October 1995, the company became a public company via an initial public offering, raising $107 million. By December 1996, DLJ had made a 386% return on its $10.5 million investment.

On February 27, 1998, the company acquired Renal Treatment Centers for $1.3 billion in stock. The integration went poorly and in July 1999, the CEO and CFO resigned. After tripling in value between 1995 and 1998, by July 1999, the stock price was down 71% year-to-date. In October 1999, Kent J. Thiry, then 43 years old, was named CEO.

In 2000, the company sold its non-U.S. operations. In October 2000, the company was renamed DaVita Inc. In October 2005, the company acquired Gambro Healthcare. In 2012, DaVita acquired Healthcare Partners for $4.42 billion, which was renamed DaVita Medical Group. In June 2019, the division was sold to UnitedHealth Group for $4.3 billion. In 2014, DaVita acquired Colorado Springs Health Partners, with 600 employees and 110,000 patients. In March 2016, it acquired the Everett Clinic Medical Group, a 20-site physicians practice with 315,000 patients in the Seattle area, for $385 million. In May 2017, it acquired WellHealth Quality Care.

In October 2014, the company agreed to pay $350 million to settle claims that it provided illegal kickbacks to doctors. In June 2015, the company agreed to pay $450 million to settle allegations that it unnecessarily disposed of drugs and then billed the U.S. federal government for this waste. In June 2018, a jury awarded the families of 3 of the company's patients $383 million in wrongful death claims after the patients died from cardiac arrest after undergoing treatment at DaVita centers. In October 2018, it agreed to pay $270 million to settle allegations that it violated the False Claims Act by providing inaccurate information that caused Medicare Advantage Plans to receive inflated payments. James Swoben, a whistleblower, received $10 million.

In July 2021, a federal grand jury indicted DaVita and former CEO Kent Thiry on charges of labor market collusion alleging participation in conspiracies with Surgical Care Affiliates to suppress competition for the services of certain senior-level employees. The company and Thiry were acquitted by a jury in April 2022. In October 2021, the Federal Trade Commission imposed limits on the company engaging in more mergers in Utah because of its history of buying up competitors.

In 2024, the Federal Trade Commission began investigating Davita along with Fresenius Medical Care under allegations they use illegal tactics to push smaller companies out of the market. In May 2025, the benefits fund of the United Food and Commercial Workers Local 1776 filed a proposed class-action lawsuit against DaVita and Fresenius Medical Care, a rival dialysis provider, alleging that the two companies illegally conspired to inflate treatment costs.
