= American Sports Medicine Institute =

- Founded: 1987
- Founder: James R. Andrews, M.D., Lawrence Lemak, M.D.
- Type: Non-profit
- Purpose: Sports Medicine
- Location: Birmingham, Alabama
- Website: www.asmi.org

American Sports Medicine Institute (ASMI) located in Birmingham, Alabama was founded in 1986 by Dr. James Andrews and Dr. Larry Lemak. It is a non-profit organization dedicated to improving the understanding, prevention, and treatment of sports-related injuries through research, technology-based education, and information dissemination.

== Pitching biomechanics evaluation ==
The research director at ASMI, Dr. Glenn Fleisig, uses video and computer technology to study the pitching motion of baseball pitchers. High speed video of the pitcher is also collected using a Vision Research high-speed video camera.
