= James Andrews (physician) =

American orthopedic surgeon (born 1942)

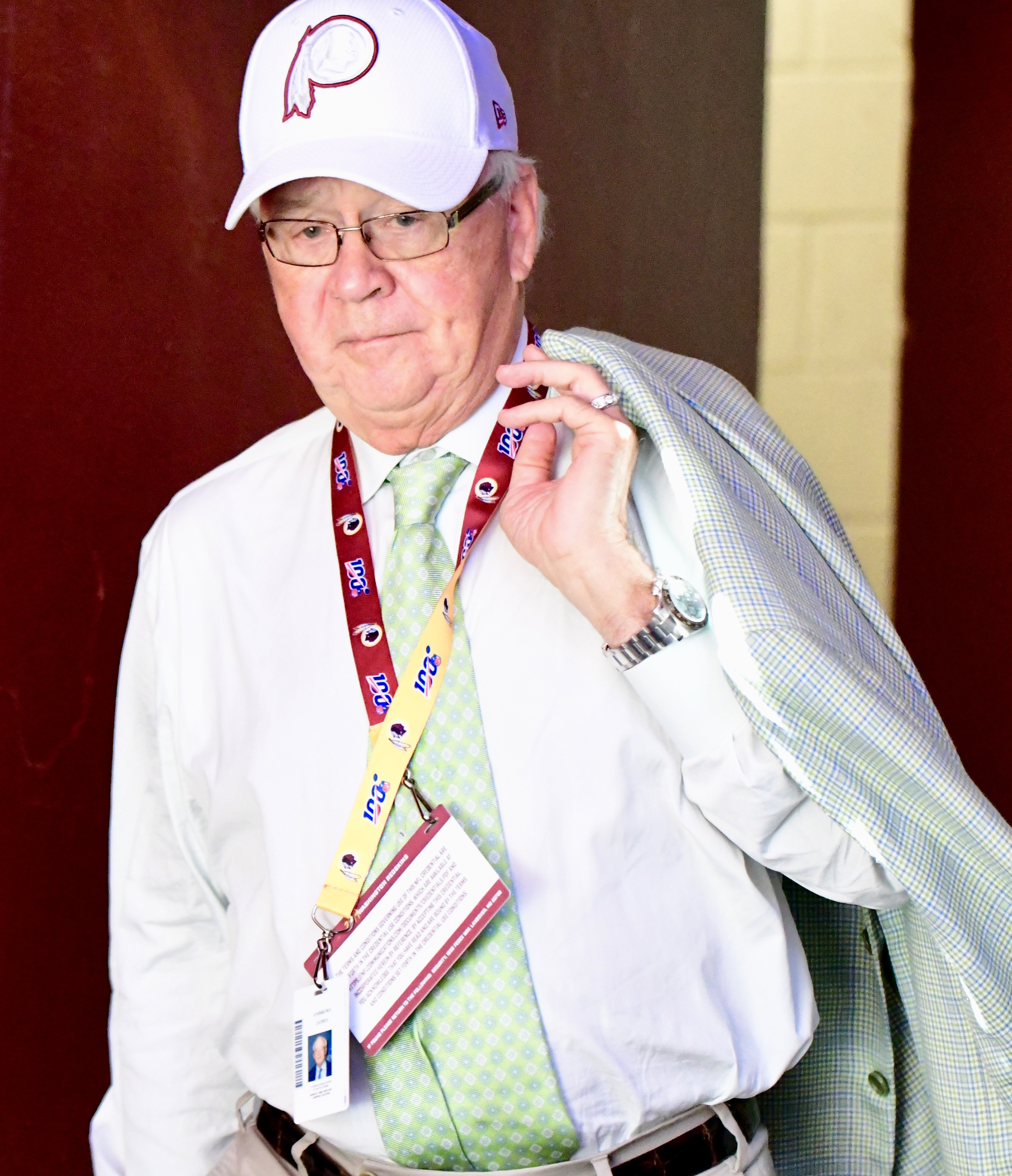
- Andrews in 2019
- Born: May 2, 1942 (age 84); Homer, Louisiana, U.S.
- Education: Louisiana State University (B.S., M.D.)
- Occupation: Orthopedic surgeon
- Known for: Andrews Institute; Andrews Research & Education Foundation; Andrews Sports Medicine & Orthopaedic Center; American Sports Medicine Institute; Alabama Sports Medicine and Orthopaedic Center
- Spouse: Jenelle Andrews
- Children: 6

James Andrews (born May 2, 1942) is a retired American orthopedic surgeon. He is a surgeon for knee, elbow, and shoulder injuries and is a specialist in repairing damaged ligaments. Andrews has become one of the best-known and most popular orthopedic surgeons and has performed on many high-profile athletes at his main practice in Birmingham, Alabama and the Andrews Institute in Gulf Breeze, Florida. He also is the team doctor for the Tampa Bay Rays, Auburn Tigers, and Washington Commanders.

== Career and education ==
Andrews received his undergraduate and medical degrees from Louisiana State University, where he was an athlete, winning a Southeastern Conference Championship in polevaulting. He completed his residency at Tulane Medical School and completed fellowships at the University of Virginia School of Medicine and the University of Lyon. Andrews briefly studied unofficially under Dr. Jack Hughston at Auburn university, a pioneer in the sports medicine field of study.

Andrews is known for performing orthopedic surgery on high-profile athletes from a wide array of sports.

Andrews has co-founded or chaired multiple research bodies and medical centers, including the Andrews Sports Medicine and Orthopedic Center in Birmingham, Alabama, the American Sports Medicine Institute (ASMI), the Andrews Institute in Gulf Breeze, Florida, and the Andrews Research and Education Foundation. He created the HealthSouth Sports Medicine Council and was behind the Go For It! Roadshow. He serves on the medical advisory board for Tenex Health, Inc., a medical device company that manufactures and markets the Tenex Health TX System for the treatment of chronic tendon and fascia pain. In 2023, Andrews announced his retirement.

=== 2018 malpractice lawsuit ===
In November 2018, retired defensive tackle Sharrif Floyd filed a $180 million medical malpractice lawsuit against Andrews for causing him debilitating muscle and nerve damage after performing an unpermitted knee surgery on him in September 2016.

=== 2023 malpractice lawsuit ===
In May 2023, it was announced that attorneys on behalf of offensive tackle Taylor Lewan had filed a medical malpractice lawsuit against Andrews over an October 2020 surgery Andrews performed to repair Lewan's torn right ACL.

== Notable patients ==
Andrews has performed surgery on many high-profile athletes. He first became known among athletes when Roger Clemens's agent advised the pitcher to visit Andrews in 1985. Andrews provided a second opinion to team doctors, performed a successful surgery on a torn labrum, and Clemens made a full recovery. Andrews would gain a reputation as an "athlete-centric" doctor, operating on athletes including Drew Brees, Bo Jackson, Michael Jordan, Jack Nicklaus, John Smoltz, Triple H, Brett Favre, Curtis Beach, Chris Godwin, Chase Young, Marcus Lattimore, and Adrian Peterson. Unusually, he has treated two baseball players with the same name, Brady Feigl. Both had the same injury and have a similar appearance, among other coincidental similarities.
