= National Center for Sports Safety =

The National Center for Sports Safety (NCSS) is a non-profit organization dedicated to promoting the importance of injury prevention and safety in youth sports. It was founded in 2001 by Lawrence J. Lemak, M.D. It focuses on decreasing the number and/or severity of injuries by educating trainers, coaches and the general public on sports safety, and by collecting, analyzing and researching injury data.

In 2004, the NCSS in conjunction with the National Athletic Trainers' Association (NATA), launched a comprehensive sports safety course called PREPARE. The course, which is available online, is targeted at volunteer coaches and parents. One of the goals of the course is to reduce the risk of brain-damage that occurs when a player that has suffered a concussion is sent back to the game too early, putting the athlete at risk for a second, more serious concussion.

The NCSS serves as a source of sports safety information to many organizations including the United States Navy and USA Baseball

== See also ==
- Head injury criterion
