= House call =

Visit at a home from a doctor

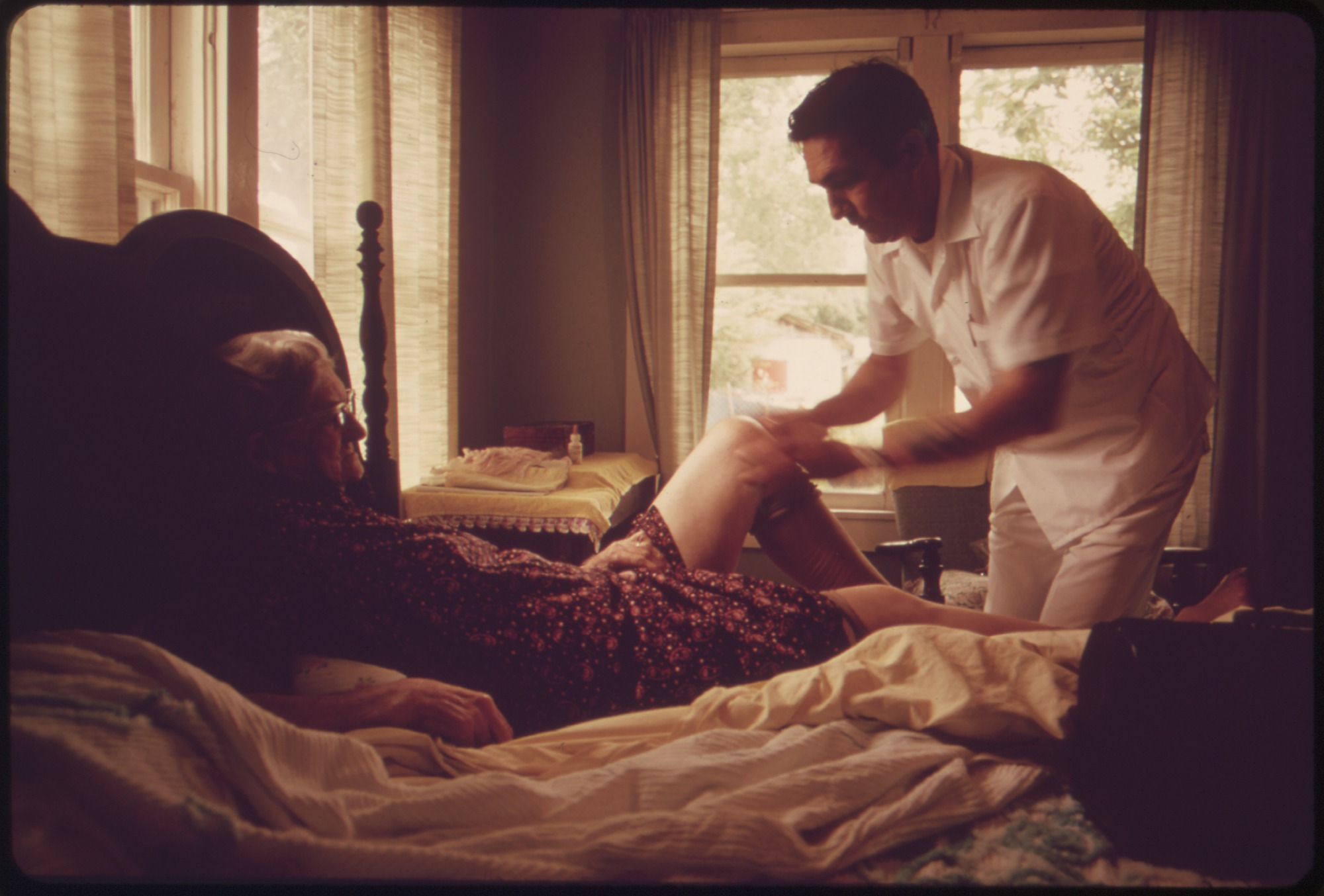
A doctor visiting an elderly patient, near San Antonio, Texas, in May 1973

A house call is medical consultation performed by a doctor or other healthcare professionals visiting the home of a patient or client, instead of the patient visiting the doctor's clinic or hospital. In some locations, families used to pay dues to a particular practice to underwrite house calls.

== History ==
In the early 1930s, house calls by doctors were 40% of doctor-patient meetings. By 1980, it was only 0.6%. Reasons include increased specialization and technology. In the 1990s, team home care, including physician visits, was a small but growing field in health care, for frail older people with chronic illnesses.

The reasons for fewer house calls include concerns about providing low-overhead care in the home, time inefficiency, and inconvenience. Yet, there are more and more doctors who like the idea of no office overhead. Also, it can provide safe access to care by people who are ill. Today, house calls may be making a revival among the wealthy through concierge telemedicine and mobile apps.

== Canada ==
In 2012 as part of its Action Plan for Healthcare the province of Ontario actively expanded funding for access to house calls with its primary focus being on seniors and those with physical limitations making it difficult for travel outside the home. Residents of Ontario with valid Ontario Health Insurance Plan cards are able to take advantage of the house call system, and arrange for appointments with physicians at their home. Currently, this service is only available in Toronto.

== United States ==
In the United States, leadership such as George Washington were known to receive house calls. Upon his deathbed in 1799, President Washington received a house call prior to his passing. Presently, the United States' leadership retain a Physician to the President on staff.

=== Midwifery ===
The US rate of out-of-hospital birth has remained steady at 1% of all births since 1989, with data from 2007 showing that 27.3% of the home births since 1989 took place in a free-standing birth center and 65.4% in a residence.

=== Outcomes ===
A 2007 randomized trial of in-home palliative care demonstrated increased patient satistifaction and decreased costs.

== USSR and post-Soviet Russia ==
In the Soviet Union the national government established a nationwide free outpatient polyclinic system, where each health center covered a part of a city, a neighbourhood, and this system has been preserved in post-Soviet times. Each general practitioner (therapeut) out of some 10 to 20 working in each state outpatient health centre serves his patients on weekdays both in his room during his 3–4 reception hours and spends another 3–4 hours on house visits (which become most numerous during flu and colds epidemics and can reach 40 per day) on his assigned block of streets with a standard number of residents. Unlike Soviet times, however, each patient now has to produce apart from his citizen ID (pasport with place of residence stamp showing his registration on the clinic's precinct) a now uniform medical insurance policy of obligatory medical insurance provided by a number of medical insurance companies through either financing by employers for working people or by the state – for children as well as old age and disability pensioners through regional funds of medical insurance.

The purpose of such visit is primary diagnostics and prescription of treatment and mode of conduct as well as prescribing blood, urine and other tests to be carried out at the polyclinic. The doctor also supplies the patient with a sick leave from work or study for a number of days and the leave is to be closed by the same doctor or his/her substitute and sealed at the clinic on the patient's recovery and checkout. If need be, the GP may arrange a visit to the sick person from one of specialist physicians from his/her clinic and of his/her nurse for giving injections.

There are two identical state systems of outpatient clinics running parallel – for adults and for children.

With the rise of private enterprise since 1990, city dwellers may place a phone order for a house call from a private medical facility (to be paid for out of patient's own money).

== See also ==
- Doctor's visit
- Home health nursing
