= Home health nursing =

Nursing specialty

Home health is a nursing specialty in which nurses provide multidimensional home care to patients of all ages. Home health care is a cost efficient way to deliver quality care in the convenience of the client's home. Home health nurses create care plans to achieve goals based on the client's diagnosis. These plans can include preventive, therapeutic, and rehabilitative actions. Home health nurses also supervise certified nursing assistants. The professional nursing organization for home health nurses is the Home Healthcare Nurses Association (HHNA). Home health care is intended for clients that are well enough to be discharged home, but still require skilled nursing personnel to assess, initiate and oversee nursing interventions.

== History ==
Lillian Wald is recognized as the pioneer of public health nursing. She established the Henry Street Settlement which served underprivileged individuals and families. Nurses and social workers that worked at the Henry Street Settlement visited patients in their homes, assessed their health needs, and provided support with hygiene, nutrition, immunizations and more. Wald was able to convince Metropolitan Life Insurance Company to cover home care services. This allowed public health nursing to shift from charitable work to profitable work.

== Roles and responsibilities ==
There is a wide range of services that are performed by many different professionals, services include wound care, disease management, medical equipment, therapy, medical social services, and patient education. Home health nurses have a wide range of duties and services provided, and in addition to services provided nurses also consult with doctors on the status of the patient and provide feedback on any potential changes that need to be made to the care plan.

Some responsibilities that home health nurses take on include promoting health and disease prevention, medication administration, educating patients on their current diagnosis, providing emotional support, and providing basic care such as personal hygiene.

Nurses also step into the role of case managers, meaning that they coordinate services from different disciplines for the patient. This can include rehabilitation, pharmacy, community resources and more.

Providing the most up-to-date and effective care for a patient is also a very important part of a home health nurse's job. They do this by continually keeping up to date on the latest research and Evidence-Based Practice.

Home health services address intermittent or periodic needs and may include:

- Skilled nursing
- Physical therapy
- Occupational therapy
- Speech therapy
- Medical social work
- Wound care
- Medication assistance
- Help with personal care from a home health aide, as needed.

== Education and certification ==
Home health nurses can have a nursing diploma, be a licensed practical nurse, have an associate of science in nursing, a bachelor of science in nursing, or higher. Some executive home health nursing positions such as those in administration or nursing management could require master's level education. Some organizations, like the American Nurses Credentialing Center offer certifications in home health care.

== Scope and standards of practice ==
The scope of home health nursing is directly related to the nursing process. This includes assessment, diagnosis, planning, implementation, and evaluation. The standards of home health nursing integrate research, education, proper use of resources, the quality of care provided, team collaboration, and ethical principles.

== Pediatric Home Health Nursing ==
To help reduce cost and improve quality of care for increasing numbers of children with chronic conditions, pediatric medicine is transitioning many patients from hospitalized care to home health management. Home Health Care is often a less expensive and more convenient option for pediatric patients, and discharge to home with home health care has been shown to reduce hospital readmission rates and length of hospital stays, ultimately reducing costs for the patient.

There are 2 types of pediatric home health nursing: 1) Skilled Nursing Visits (SNV): intermittent, short visits by nurses to a patient's home with the goal of helping the patient and caregivers reach total independence at home. Nurses typically visit the patient to provide monitoring, perform lab work, and administer medications. 2) Private Duty Nursing (PDN): extended, 24-hour care services to patients at home to satisfy long-term care needs of patients who cannot safely live at home with their caregivers without medical care supervision. In a recent study of 2783 hospitalized pediatric patients who were discharged home with home health nursing, 92% of the patients received PDN services, while 8% received SNV, suggesting that PDN is more common in the pediatric population.

== Barriers in home health nursing ==
Home health nursing is a unique field considering the obstacles faced by healthcare professionals. When out visiting clients, the nurse is alone and cannot rely on others most of the time. Nurses in home health care must learn to be autonomous.

The variety of home conditions that a nurse will step into can also present problems. Cleanliness and safety play large roles in client care. Not all homes are equipped to provide a clean environment for the client. Environmental issues in the home include unsanitary conditions that allow for bacterial growth and conditions that may increase the risk of falling for the client, such as poor lighting and area rugs. Education regarding this is important for the nurse to share with the client.

Medication adherence is also more complicated at home. Unlike in a hospital setting, the medication is scheduled around the clock and readily available. It is really dependent on the client's resources and financial situation. Also, client compliance, or client adherence to the plan of care, factors into client health outcomes.

== Eligibility ==
Home health care is generally less expensive and more convenient than in the hospital. When possible home health care helps regain independence, become more self-sufficient, and maintain current level of function. The primary payer for home health care is Medicare dependent on meeting certain eligibility criteria.

Home health services are covered when all of the following criteria are met:

1. Patient is under the care of a doctor, and getting services under a plan of care established.
2. A doctor certifies that the patient needs, one or more of the following: intermittent skilled nursing care, physical therapy, speech-language pathology, and continued occupational therapy
3. Home health agency caring for patient is approved by Medicare
4. Doctor certifies that patient is homebound
5. As part of eligibility, a doctor or health care professional must document that they have had a face to face encounter within required timeframe and the reason was related to need for home health care

Eligibility for home health care is determined by intermittent skilled nursing care that is needed fewer than 7 days each week and daily less than 8 hours each day for up to 21 days. If skilled nursing care is needed more than this over extended period of time it would not qualify for home health benefits under Medicare guidelines.

== See also ==
- Assisted living
- Caregiver
- Community nursing
- Faith community nursing
- History of nursing
- Home care
- Hospice
- House call
- Nurse-client relationship
- Nurse educator
- Nursing
- Nursing home
- Personal care assistant
- Public health nursing
- Travel nursing
