= List of Phi Delta Theta members =

The signature of Lou Gehrig indicating his membership into Phi Delta Theta

This is a list of prominent alumni of the Phi Delta Theta fraternity. Names are listed followed by the school attended and their graduation year.

== Academia ==
=== Presidents ===
- Guy Potter Benton, Ohio Wesleyan, 1886 – president of Miami University (1902–1911); president of University of the Philippines (1921–1925)
- John R. Conniff, Tulane University, 1893 – educator; 7th president of Louisiana Tech University
- Frederick W. Hinitt, Westminster College (Missouri), 1889 – president of Parsons College (1900–1904); president of Centre College (1904–1915); president of Washington & Jefferson College (1915–1918)
- Robert Khayat, University of Mississippi, 1960 – chancellor of the University of Mississippi (1995–2009)
- Charles Boynton Knapp, Iowa State University, 1967 – president of the University of Georgia (1987–1997)
- John D. Millett, DePauw University – president of Miami University (1953–1964)
- James Milliken, University of Nebraska–Lincoln – chancellor of the University of Texas System (2018–present); chancellor of the City University of New York (2014–2018); president of the University of Nebraska system (2004–2014)
- Santa J. Ono, University of British Columbia – incoming president of the University of Florida, president of University of Michigan (2022–2025); president and vice-chancellor of University of British Columbia (2016–2022); President University of Cincinnati (2012–2016)
- Walter Riggs, Auburn University, 1892 – president of Clemson University (1910–1924)
- Andrew Sledd, Randolph-Macon College, 1893 – founding president of the modern University of Florida (1905–1909); president of Southern University (1910–1914)
- John J. Tigert, Vanderbilt University, 1902 – president of Kentucky Wesleyan College (1909–1913); US Commissioner of Education (1921–1928); third president of the University of Florida (1928–1947)
- William G. Tight – president of the University of New Mexico (1902–1909)
- T. K. Wetherell, Florida State University, 1968 – president of Florida State University (2003–2009)

=== Deans ===
- Liberty Hyde Bailey, Michigan State University, 1882 – horticulturist, founded and first dean of the New York State College of Agriculture at Cornell University
- Charles E. Chadsey, Stanford University, 1892 - dean of the University of Illinois College of Education
- William Harding Mayes, Vanderbilt University, 1881 – founder and dean of the University of Texas School of Journalism
- Don K. Price, Vanderbilt University, 1931 – political scientist and founding dean of the John F. Kennedy School of Government

=== Professors ===
- Paul Morton Gaston, Swarthmore College, 1952—civil rights activist and professor of southern history at the University of Virginia. While at Swarthmore, he attended the fraternity’s national conference in Chicago in an unsuccessful attempt to overturn their policy agains admitting Jews and Blacks.
- Steve Hanke, University of Colorado, 1964 – economist and professor of applied economics at the Johns Hopkins University
- Vernon Lyman Kellogg, University of Kansas, 1889 – entomologist who established the Department of Zoology at Stanford University
- Frederic Brewster Loomis, Amherst College, 1896 – paleontologist at Amherst College
- Adam G. Riess, Massachusetts Institute of Technology, 1992 – Nobel Prize Recipient for Physics, 2011; astrophysicist and Bloomberg Distinguished Professor at Johns Hopkins University and the Space Telescope Science Institute

== Aerospace and astronomy ==
- Neil Armstrong, Purdue University, 1955 – Commander of Apollo 11 and first man to walk on the Moon
- William F. Durand, Michigan State, 1880 – first civilian chair of the National Advisory Committee for Aeronautics, the forerunner of NASA
- Jon McBride, West Virginia, 1964 – NASA astronaut, Space Shuttle Columbia
- F. Story Musgrave, Syracuse University, 1958 – NASA astronaut, Space Shuttle Challenger, Space Shuttle Columbia
- Thomas Jefferson Jackson See, University of Missouri, 1889 – astronomer for the United States Navy
- Joel Stebbins, University of Nebraska – Lincoln, 1899 – astronomer

== Art and architecture ==
- Francis Chapin, Washington & Jefferson College, 1921 – painter
- Julian Franklin Everett, University of Wisconsin, 1894 – architect known for his work in Seattle
- Hank Ketcham, University of Washington, 1941 – cartoonist, creator of Dennis the Menace comic strip
- Frank Lloyd Wright, University of Wisconsin, 1888 – architect

== Business ==
- Robert Allen, Wabash College, 1957 – chairman of AT&T (1988–97)
- John Y. Brown, Jr., University of Kentucky, 1956 – co-founder of Kentucky Fried Chicken; former Kentucky Governor
- Tim Collins, Depauw University, 1978 – founder, senior managing director, and CEO of Ripplewood Holdings LLC
- Powel Crosley Jr., University of Cincinnati, 1909 – manufactured Crosley automobiles, pioneer in radio broadcasting, owner of Cincinnati Reds
- William H. Danforth, Washington University in St Louis, 1892 – founder of Ralston Purina Mills pet food company
- Robert Diamond, Colby College – president of Barclays PLC
- Charles W. "Chuck" Durham, Iowa State University, 1939 – former owner, CEO, and chairman emeritus of HDR, Inc.
- The Honourable Trevor Eyton, OC, QC, University of Toronto, 1956 – former president and chief executive officer of Brascan Limited
- William F. Harrah, UCLA, 1934 – founder of Harrah's Hotel and Casinos
- Josh Harris, Wharton School, 1986 – co-founder of Apollo Global Management and owner of several sports teams
- Drew Houston, MIT, 2006 – founder and CEO of Dropbox
- Marcum Hicks, University of Oklahoma, 2020 - Accountant
- Clark Hunt, Southern Methodist University – chairman and CEO of the Kansas City Chiefs
- Ray Lee Hunt, Southern Methodist University – chairman and chief executive officer of Hunt Oil Company
- Mark Hurd, Baylor University, 1979 – former CEO of NCR Corporation, Hewlett-Packard, and Oracle Corporation
- F. Ross Johnson, University of Manitoba, 1952 – former CEO of RJR Nabisco
- John Willard Marriott, University of Utah, 1926 – founder of Marriott Corporation
- Charles Peter McColough, Dalhousie University, 1943 – former chairman and CEO of Xerox
- Edward Avery McIlhenny, Lehigh University, 1894 – son of Tabasco brand pepper sauce inventor Edmund McIlhenny
- James McLamore, Cornell University, 1942 – founder of Burger King
- Dave Morin, University of Colorado Boulder, 2003 – entrepreneur and angel investor
- Brian Niccol, Miami University, 1996 – chairman and CEO of Starbucks, former CEO of Chipotle and Taco Bell
- Ronald K. Richey, Washburn University, 1949 – president and CEO of the Torchmark Corporation
- Hermon Scott, M.I.T. 1930 – founder of H.H. Scott, Inc.
- Roger Smith, University of Michigan, 1946 – chairman of General Motors
- David Steiner, Louisiana State University, 1982—former CEO of Waste Management
- Mark Suster, University of California San Diego, 1991 – entrepreneur, angel investor, and venture capitalist with Upfront Ventures
- John H. Tyson, University of Arkansas, 1975 – chairman of Tyson Foods

== Entertainment ==
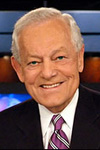
Bob Schieffer

=== Film and television ===
- Harry Ackerman, Dartmouth College, 1935 – Emmy Award winner; producer of Gidget, Bewitched, I Dream of Jeannie, The Flying Nun, The Monkees, and The Partridge Family
- Joseph Ashton – actor, film and voice actor
- Gary Bender, Wichita State, 1962 – Fox Sports anchor
- Dirk Benedict, Whitman College, 1967 – actor, The A-Team
- Ted Bessell, University of Colorado, 1957 – actor, daytime Emmy Award winner
- Bill Bixby, University of California (Berkeley), 1956 – actor, director, writer, The Incredible Hulk, My Favorite Martian
- Prince Lorenzo Borghese, Rollins College, 1995 – bachelor in The Bachelor: Rome
- Kurt Caceres, Sacramento State University, 1998 – actor, The Shield, Prison Break
- Trey Callaway, University of Southern California, 1989 – writer of I Still Know What You Did Last Summer; producer of CSI: NY
- Brett Claywell, North Carolina State 2000 – actor, One Tree Hill
- Dabney Coleman, University of Texas, 1953 – actor, Tootsie, Stuart Little
- Mike Connors, UCLA, 1950 – actor; Golden Globe Winner; Emmy Award winner for Mannix
- Tim Conway, Bowling Green University, 1956 – actor, McHale's Navy, The Carol Burnett Show
- Mark DeCarlo, Drake University, 1984 – actor, host on the Travel Channel
- Colby Donaldson, Texas Tech, 1996 – actor, runner-up on Survivor: The Australian Outback
- Jonathan Drubner, Syracuse University, 1991 – television personality; writer, ESPNU College Road Trip; head writer for the ESPY Awards
- George Eads, Texas Tech, 1990 – actor, CSI: Crime Scene Investigation
- Roger Ebert, University of Illinois, 1964 – film critic, author
- Willie Geist, Vanderbilt University, 1997 – NBC News personality, co-host of Morning Joe and Sunday Today with Willie Geist anchor
- Donald Gibb, University of New Mexico, 1976 – actor, played "Ogre" in Revenge of the Nerds
- Chris Hansen, Michigan State University, 1981 – journalist known for appearing on Dateline NBC and To Catch a Predator
- Dean Hargrove, Wichita State University, 1960 – producer, Emmy Award winner for Perry Mason, Matlock
- Van Heflin, University of Oklahoma, 1932 – Academy Award-winning actor
- Jeffrey Hunter, Northwestern University, 1950 – actor, King of Kings
- Richard Kelly, University of Southern California, 1997 – writer, producer, Donnie Darko
- Robert Kintner, University of Washington, 1944 – president of the ABC
- Francis D. Lyon, UCLA, 1928 – Academy Award-winning editor
- Al Mayer Jr., CSUN, 1991 – Academy Award, Emmy Award for Technical Achievement
- Michael McDonald, University of Southern California, 1987 – actor, MADtv
- Stan Moore, Baylor University – director, screenwriter, film producer, and two-time Emmy Award winner
- Michael Murphy, University of Arizona, 1960 – actor
- Brock Pemberton, University of Kansas, 1908 – founder of the Tony Awards
- James Pierce, Indiana University, 1920 – actor, Tarzan
- Burt Reynolds, Florida State, 1958 – actor, Golden Globe winner; star of Smokey and the Bandit
- Bob Schieffer, Texas Christian University, 1959 – CBS News anchor
- Zachary Scott, University of Texas, 1935 – actor
- Ted Shackelford, Westminster College, 1968 – actor, Knots Landing
- Sonny Shroyer, University of Georgia, 1958 – actor, Dukes of Hazzard
- Donald Simpson, University of Oregon, 1966 – producer, Top Gun, Beverly Hills Cop, Days of Thunder, Bad Boys, The Rock
- Frank Stanton, Ohio Wesleyan University, 1937 – former president of CBS
- Josh Taylor, Dartmouth College, 1965 – actor, Days of Our Lives, The Hogan Family
- Trey Wingo, Baylor University, 1985 – ESPN commentator; host of NFL PrimeTime
- Hugh Wilson, University of Florida, 1965 – Emmy Award winner; producer of WKRP in Cincinnati
- Trey Wingo, Baylor, 1985 – ESPN anchor
- Robert Wise, Franklin College, 1936 – Academy Award-winning director/producer, West Side Story, Sound of Music

=== Music ===
- Josh Abbott, Texas Tech University – country musician, Josh Abbott Band
- Chris Cagle, Northwest Missouri State University, 2005 – country musician
- Frank Crumit, Ohio University, 1912 – singer and songwriter
- Casey Donahew, Texas A&M University – country musician, Casey Donahew Band
- Wayland Holyfield, University of Arkansas, 1964 – songwriter
- Bob James, University of Michigan, 1961 – jazz musician, Grammy Award recipient
- Werner Janssen, Dartmouth College, 1921 – conductor and composer
- Erich Kunzel, Dartmouth College, 1957 – symphony conductor; Grammy Award recipient
- Phil Pritchett, Southwestern University – country musician, singer, and songwriter
- Phil Walden, Mercer University, 1962 – founder of Capricorn Records
- Hudson Westbrook, Texas Tech University, 2023 - country musician

=== Radio ===
- Earle C. Anthony, UC Berkeley, 1903 – pioneer broadcaster; founder and owner of KFI and other radio stations
- Edgar White Burrill, Amherst College, 1906 – radio announcer and lecturer
- Elmer Davis, Franklin College, 1910 – radio news reporter, director of the U.S. Office of War Information in World War II, Peabody Award recipient
- Ken Niles, University of Montana, 1928 – radio actor
- Wendell Niles, University of Montana, 1927 – broadcaster during the Golden Age of Radio
- Bob Prince, University of Pittsburgh, 1938 – radio sportscaster

=== Video games ===
- Alex Seropian, University of Chicago, 1991 – developer of the Halo, Marathon, and Myth game series

== Law ==
- Leslie Blackwell, University of Toronto, 1923 – Attorney General of Ontario
- Henry Hague Davis, University of Toronto, 1907 – justice of the Supreme Court of Canada, 1935–1944
- Henry F. Mason, Wisconsin, 1881 – Chief Justice of the Kansas Supreme Court
- William Gordon Mathews, University of Virginia School of Law, 1897 – Federal judge
- Charles D. McAtee, Washburn University, 1950 – Kansas Attorney General
- James C. McReynolds, Vanderbilt University, 1883 – Associate Justice of the Supreme Court of the United States
- Sherman Minton, Indiana University, 1915 – Associate Justice of the Supreme Court of the United States
- Milford K. Smith, associate justice of the Vermont Supreme Court
- Frederick Moore Vinson, Centre College, 1909 – Chief Justice of the United States

== Literature and journalism ==
- Thomas J. Anderson, Vanderbilt University, 1934, – author, journalist, and the American Party presidential nominee in 1976
- Ray Stannard Baker, Michigan State University, 1889 – biographer, Pulitzer Prize winner
- Louis Bromfield, Columbia University, 1920 – Pulitzer Prize winner for Early Autumn
- Po Bronson, Stanford, 1986 – writer
- Gardner Cowles, Sr, Iowa Wesleyan, 1882 – publisher of The Des Moines Register and Leader (later The Des Moines Register) and patriarch of the Cowles family who at one time controlled the Minneapolis Star-Tribune, the Buffalo Courier-Express, the Scottsdale Progress and the Rapid City Journal
- Eugene Field, Knox College, 1872 – poet, author of children's books
- Walter Havighurst, Ohio Wesleyan University, 1923 – writer and professor
- Don Herold, Indiana University, 1912 – humorist
- James Michener, Swarthmore College, 1929 – Pulitzer Prize winner, Presidential Medal of Freedom recipient
- Dan Moldea, The University of Akron, 1973 – author, writer of organized crime and American political books
- Byron Price, Wabash College, 1912 – journalist with the Associated Press, director of Office of Censorship for which he received a special Pulitzer Prize in 1944
- Reynolds Price, Duke University, 1955 – writer, essayist
- Grantland Rice, Vanderbilt University, 1901 – sportswriter and poet
- Edward K. Thompson, University of North Dakota, 1927 – managing editor of Life magazine
- William Allen White, University of Kansas, 1890 – editor, writer, Pulitzer Prize winner

== Military ==
=== Military honor recipients ===
- John Henry Balch, Northwestern University, 1920 – Medal of Honor recipient, World War I
- John C. Black, Wabash, 1862 – Medal of Honor recipient, Civil War
- William P. Black, Wabash, 1864 – Medal of Honor recipient, Civil War
- Henry V. Boynton, Kentucky Military Institute, 1858 – Medal of Honor recipient, Civil War
- Robert W. Cary, University of Missouri, 1912 – Medal of Honor recipient, peacetime; Distinguished Service Cross, World War I
- Frederick Funston, University of Kansas, 1890 – Medal of Honor recipient, Philippine–American War
- Robert Hampton Gray, University of British Columbia, 1940 – Victoria Cross recipient, World War II; namesake of Royal Canadian Navy arctic/offshore patrol vessel, HMCS Robert Hampton Gray
- Alexander R. Skinker, Washington University in St. Louis, 1905 – Medal of Honor recipient, World War I
- Robert Taplett, University of South Dakota, 1940 – Navy Cross recipient, Korean War
- Leon Vance, University of Oklahoma, 1937 – Medal of Honor recipient, World War II

=== Military officers ===
- Jacob Ammen, Indiana University, 1830 – general, Union Army, Civil War
- William M. Browne, University of Georgia, 1843 – general, secretary of state, Confederate States of America
- Arthur S. Champeny, Washburn University – brigadier general; the only person in US history to receive the Distinguished Service Cross in three separate wars
- John K. Davis, University of New Mexico, 1951 – assistant commandant, Marine Corps, 1983–86
- Louis R. de Steiguer, Ohio University, 1887 – admiral; commander in chief, Battle Fleet, US Fleet, 1927–1928
- Julian Ewell, Duke University, 1936 – United States Army lieutenant general; Commander of Operation Speedy Express; commander of the 9th US Infantry Division
- Robert L. Ghormley, University of Idaho, 1903 – commander of all forces during the Guadalcanal campaign in WWII
- Arthur F. Gorham, Miami University, circa 1932 (uninitiated, transferred to West Point) – lieutenant colonel; commander, 1st Battalion, 505th Parachute Infantry Regiment during Operation Husky, the invasion of Sicily; twice awarded the Distinguished Service Cross
- Leonard D. Heaton, Denison College, 1923 – US major general Surgeon General
- Chuck Horner, University of Iowa, 1958 – commander of NORAD North American Aerospace Defense Command; Commander of Allied Air Force for Desert Storm
- Edgar Jadwin, Lafayette College, 1888 – lieutenant general, chief of engineers 1926–1929
- David E. Jeremiah, University of Oregon, 1955 – admiral, acting chairman Joint Chiefs of Staff, October 1993
- Homer W. Kiefer, Ohio Wesleyan University, 1917 – US Army major general
- Edward P. King, University of Georgia, 1903 – major general, commanding officer, Bataan, World War II
- Eli Long, Indiana University, 1855 – major general, Union Army, Civil War
- John S. McCain Sr., University of Mississippi, 1905 – vice admiral and commander of all land-based naval aircraft in the South Pacific, World War II
- William A. McCain, University of Mississippi, 1897–1908 – US Army brigadier general
- Scott O'Grady, University of Washington, 1988 – USAF captain shot down over Bosnia, rescued six days later
- Edwin D. Patrick, Indiana University, 1916 – major general, commander of the 6th Infantry Division in WWII
- Bernard W. Rogers, Kansas State University, 1943 – general, Supreme Allied Commander Europe, NATO
- Leroy W. Stutz, Washburn University, 1960 – Air Force colonel; spent 2,284 days as a prisoner of war during Vietnam

== Politics ==
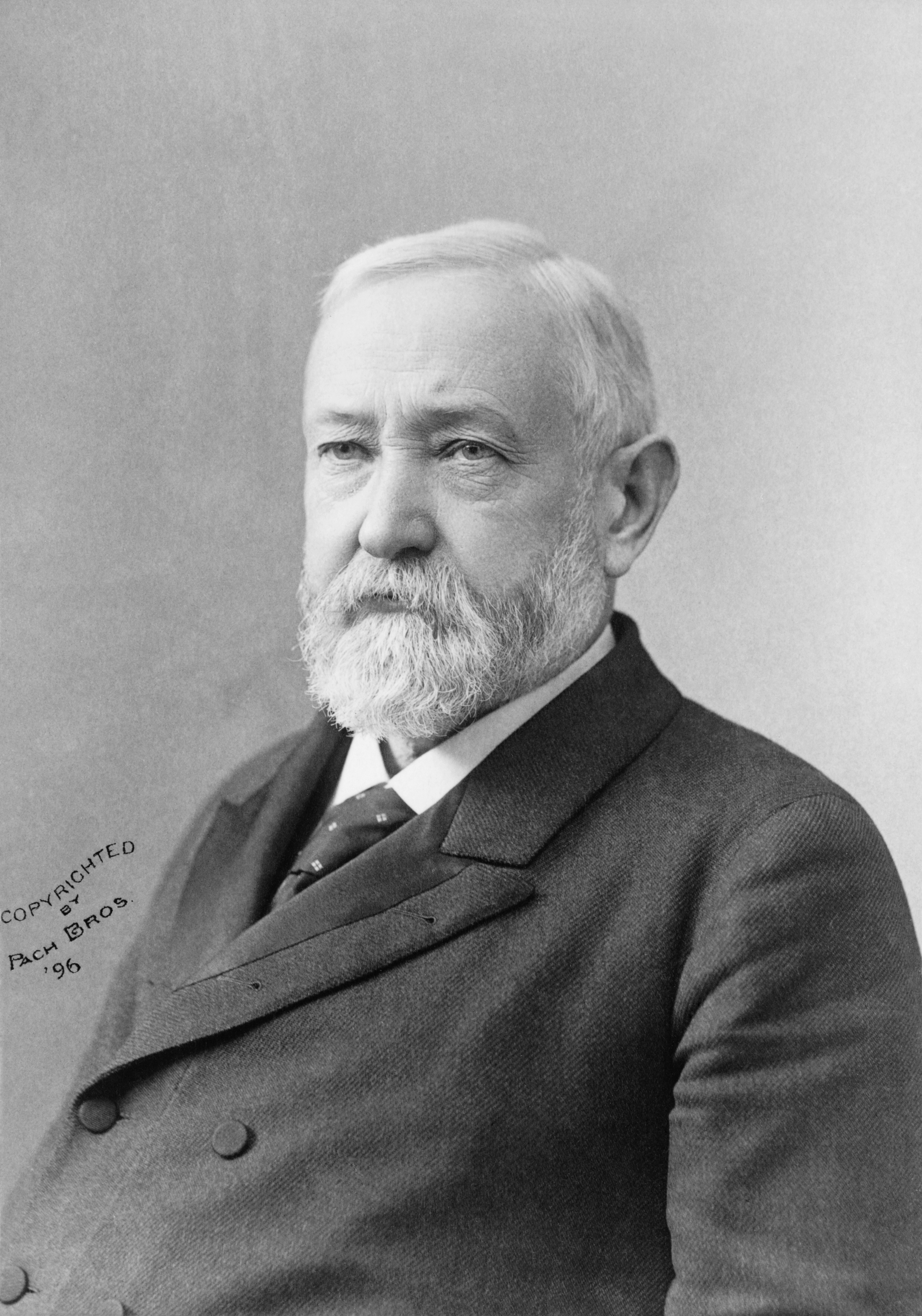
Benjamin Harrison
23rd President of the United States

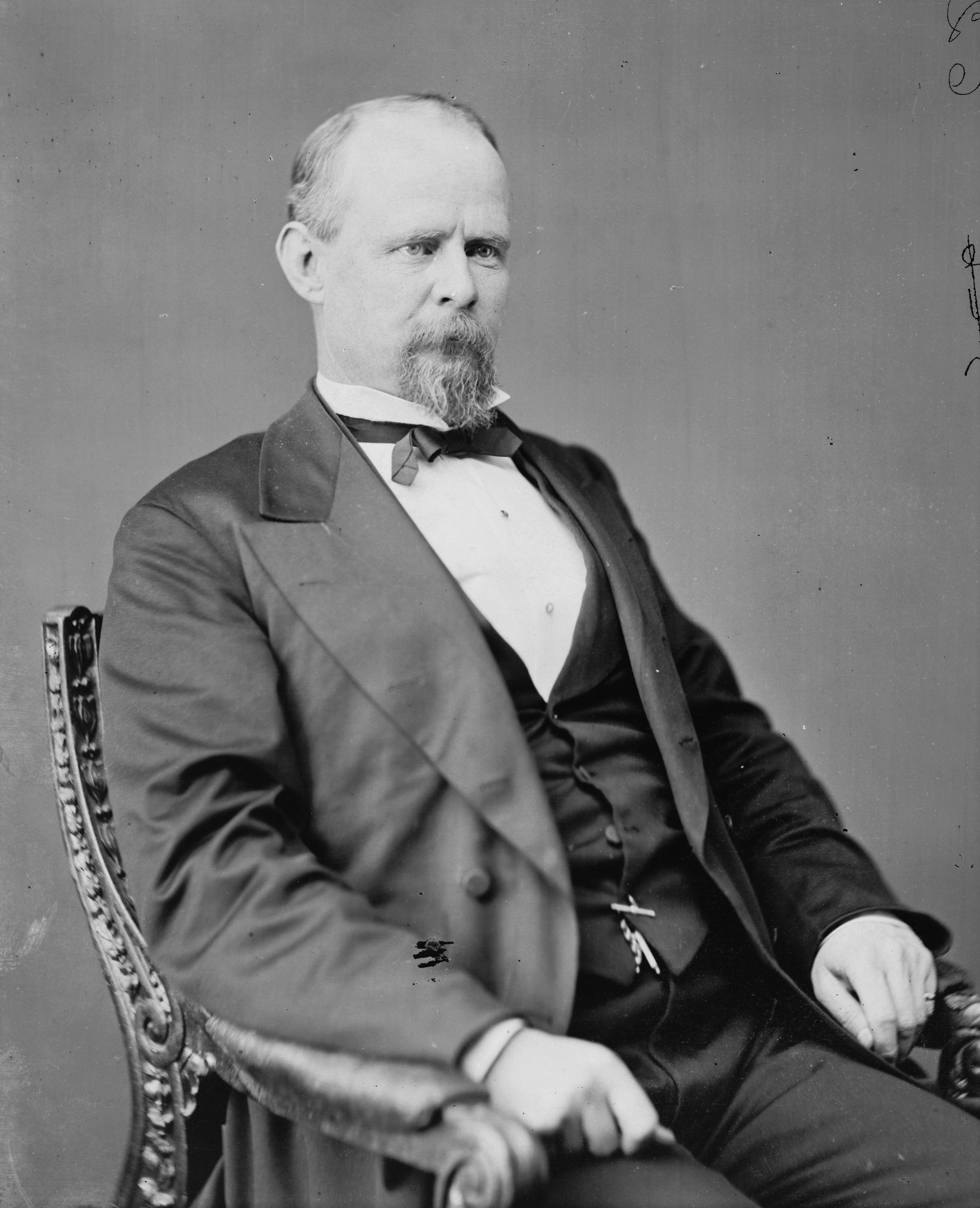
Adlai Stevenson I,
23rd Vice President of the United States

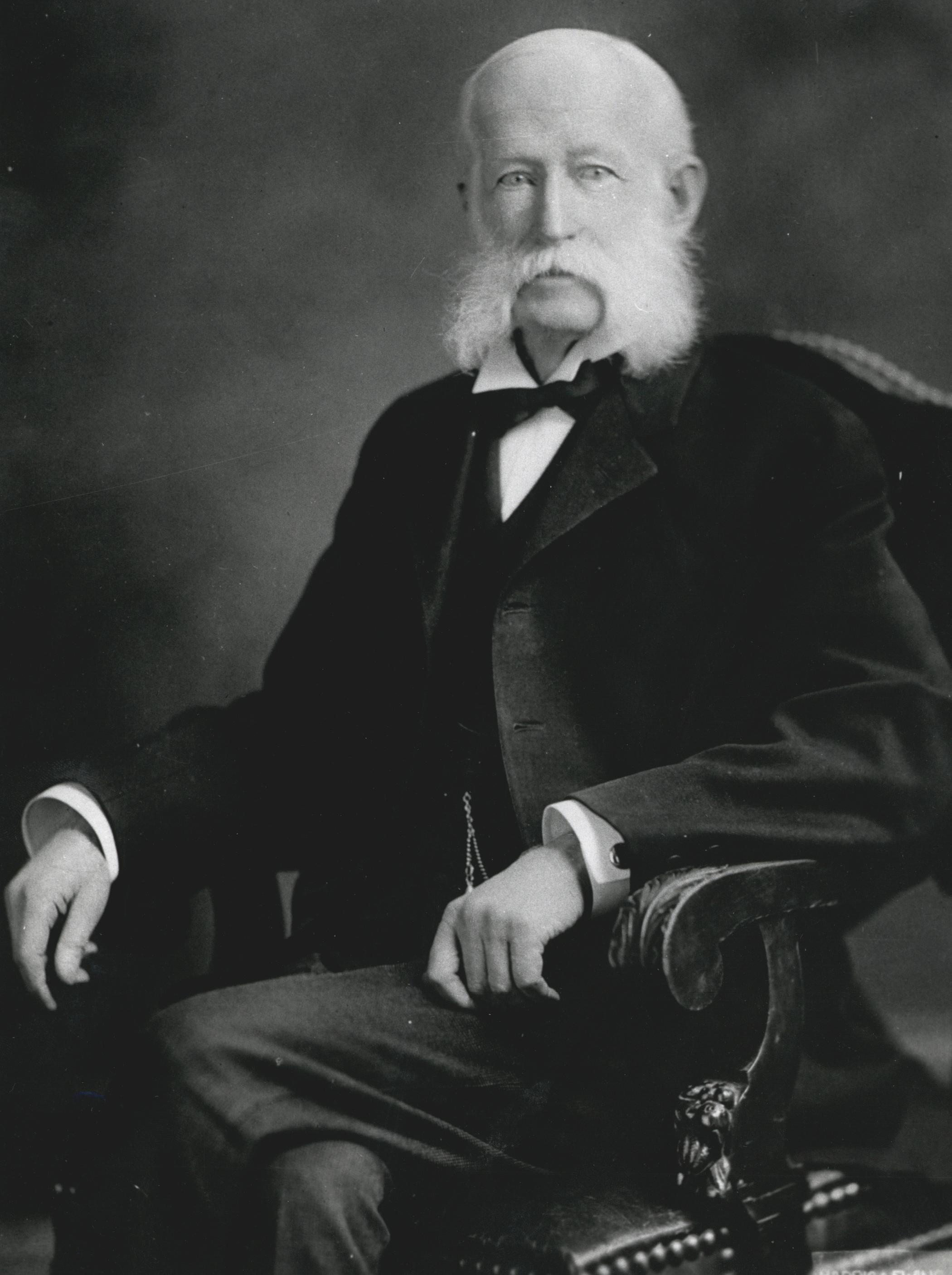
John W. Foster
32nd Secretary of State of the United States

=== Executive branch ===
- James Baker, University of Texas, 1957 – United States Secretary of State, Bush administration; founder of the James Baker Institute
- Benjamin Harrison, Miami University (Ohio), 1852 – 23rd President of the United States
- John W. Foster, Indiana University, 1855 – United States Secretary of State
- David F. Houston, University of South Carolina, 1887 – 5th United States Secretary of Agriculture, 48th United States Secretary of the Treasury
- Harold Ickes, University of Chicago, 1897 – United States Secretary of the Interior, 1933–46
- Hamilton Jordan, University of Georgia, 1964 – White House Chief of Staff, Carter administration
- Robert P. Patterson, Union College, 1912- former United States Secretary of War
- Wilton Persons, Auburn University, 1916 – White House Chief of Staff, Eisenhower administration
- Adlai E. Stevenson, Centre College, 1860 – 23rd Vice President of the United States
- Frederick Moore Vinson, Centre College, 1909 – United States Secretary of the Treasury

=== Diplomacy ===
- Geoffrey R. Pyatt, University of California, Irvine, 1985 – United States Ambassador to Greece
- Tom Schieffer, University of Texas, 1970 – United States Ambassador to Japan

=== Governors ===
- Neil Abercrombie, Union, 1959 – Governor of Hawaii, 2010–14
- Forrest H. Anderson, University of Montana, 1937 – Governor of Montana, 1969–73
- Jerry Apodaca, University of New Mexico, 1956 – Governor of New Mexico, 1974–79
- Joseph C. Blackburn, Centre College, 1857 – Governor of the Panama Canal Zone, 1907–09; also a US Senator from Kentucky
- Roger D. Branigin, Franklin College, 1923 – Governor of Indiana, 1965–69
- John Y. Brown, Jr., University of Kentucky, 1956 – Governor of Kentucky, 1979–83
- George Busbee, University of Georgia, 1950 – Governor of Georgia, 1975–83
- William Prentice Cooper, Vanderbilt University, 1917 – Governor of Tennessee, 1939–45
- Jon Corzine, University of Illinois, 1969 – Governor of New Jersey 2006–10
- William Haselden Ellerbe, Wofford College, 1883 – Governor of South Carolina, 1877–99
- Samuel H. Elrod, DePauw University, 1882 – Governor of South Dakota, 1905–07
- Joseph B. Ely, Williams College, 1902 – Governor of Massachusetts, 1931–35
- Norman A. Erbe, University of Iowa, 1947 – Governor of Iowa, 1960–63
- Booth Gardner, University of Washington, 1958 – Governor of Washington, 1985–93
- Chester Harding, University of Alabama, 1884 – Governor of the Panama Canal Zone, 1917–21
- Thomas W. Hardwick, Mercer University, 1892 – Governor of Georgia, 1921–23; also a US Senator and Congressman
- Warren E. Hearnes, University of Missouri, 1943 – Governor of Missouri, 1965–73
- James Holshouser, Davidson College, 1956 – Governor of North Carolina, 1973–77
- Herman G. Kump, University of Virginia, 1905 – Governor of West Virginia, 1932–36
- Brad Little, University of Idaho 1977 – Governor of Idaho, 2019–present; Lieutenant Governor of Idaho, 2009–19
- Hill McAlister, Vanderbilt University, 1897 – Governor of Tennessee, 1933–37
- Tom McCall, University of Oregon, 1936 – Governor of Oregon, 1966–75
- Douglas McKay, Oregon State University, 1941 – Governor of Oregon, 1949–52
- Arthur C. Mellette, Indiana University, 1864 – Governor of South Dakota, 1889–93
- John T. Morrison, Lafayette College, 1880 – Governor of Idaho, 1903–05
- Ragnvald A. Nestos, University of North Dakota, 1904 – Governor of North Dakota, 1921–25
- Malcolm R. Patterson, Vanderbilt University, 1882 – Governor of Tennessee, 1907–11
- Alexander Ramsey, Lafayette College, 1836 (Honorary) – Governor of Minnesota, 1849–53, also US Senator, Congressman, and Secretary of War
- Jim Risch, University of Idaho, 1965 – Governor of Idaho, 2005–06
- Hulett C. Smith, University of Pennsylvania, 1938 – Governor of West Virginia, 1965–69
- Adlai Stevenson II, Princeton University, 1922 – Governor of Illinois, 1949–53
- Ernest Vandiver, University of Georgia, 1940 – Governor of Georgia, 1959–63
- William Winter, University of Mississippi, 1944 – Governor of Mississippi, 1980–84
- Mark White, Baylor University, 1962 – Governor of Texas, 1983–87
- C. C. Young, UC Berkeley, 1892 – Governor of California, 1927–31

=== Lt. Governor ===
- James Bartleman, University of Western Ontario, 1963 – 27th Lieutenant Governor of Ontario
- Louis Orville Breithaupt, University of Toronto, 1913 – 18th Lieutenant Governor of Ontario
- Garde Gardom, University of British Columbia, 1946 – Lieutenant Governor of British Columbia, 1995–2001
- William Harding Mayes, Vanderbilt University, 1881 – Lieutenant Governor of Texas
- Victor Oland, Dalhousie University, 1933 – Lieutenant Governor of Nova Scotia, 1968–1973
- Drew Wrigley, University of North Dakota 1988 – Lieutenant Governor of North Dakota

=== Parliament of Canada ===
- William Moore Benidickson, University of Manitoba, 1932 – Canadian Senator, 1965–1985
- Donald Cameron, University of Alberta, 1939 – Canadian Senator of Alberta
- Henry Read Emmerson, McGill University, 1906 – Canadian Senator of New Brunswick, 1949–1954
- Trevor Eyton, OC, University of Toronto, 1956 – Canadian Senator
- Michael Kirby, OC, Dalhousie University, 1963 – Canadian Senator of Nova Scotia, 1984–2006; chair of the Mental Health Commission of Canada
- Gerald Regan, Dalhousie University, 1952 – Premier of Nova Scotia, 1970–1978

=== U.S. Senate ===
- Brock Adams, University of Washington, 1948 – Secretary of the Treasury; Congressman from Washington; senator from Washington, 1987–1993
- John Allen, Wabash College, 1867 – senator from Washington, 1889–1892
- Joseph C. Blackburn, Centre College, 1857 – senator from Kentucky, 1885–1906
- Mike Braun, Wabash College, 1976 – senator from Indiana, 2019–present
- James Broyhill, University of North Carolina, 1950 – senator from North Carolina, 1985–1991
- Harry P. Cain, University of the South, 1929 – senator from Washington, 1946–1952
- Thomas Connally, University of Texas, 1898 – senator from Texas, 1929–1952
- Harry Darby, University of Illinois, 1917 – senator from Kansas, 1949–1950
- Dennis DeConcini, University of Arizona, 1959 – senator from Arizona, 1977–1994
- Duncan U. Fletcher, Vanderbilt University, 1880 – senator from Florida, 1909–36
- Wyche Fowler, Davidson College, 1962 – senator from Georgia, 1987–1992
- James Z. George, University of Mississippi – senator from Mississippi, 1881–1898
- Thomas W. Hardwick, Mercer University, 1892 – senator from Georgia, 1913–1918
- J. Bennett Johnston, Washington & Lee College, 1954 – senator from Louisiana, 1972–1997
- Eugene D. Millikin, University of Colorado, 1913 – senator from Colorado, 1941–1956
- Sherman Minton, Indiana University – Senator from Indiana, 1935–1941
- Sam Nunn, Georgia Tech 1960 – founder of the Nuclear Threat Initiative; senator from Georgia, 1972–1997
- James E. Risch, University of Idaho, 1965, 1968 – J.D.; senator from Idaho, 2008–present
- Arthur Raymond Robinson, University of Chicago, 1913 – senator from Indiana, 1925–1934
- Elbert Thomas, University of Utah, 1906 – senator from Utah, 1933–1950
- John Elmer Thomas, DePauw University, 1900 – senator from Oklahoma, 1927–1950
- Thomas R. Underwood, University of Kentucky, 1919 – Congressman from Indiana; senator from Indiana, 1951–1952
- William F. Vilas, University of Wisconsin, 1858 – senator from Wisconsin, 1891–1896
- Edward Cary Walthall, University of Mississippi – senator from Indiana, 1885–1894
- Xenophon P. Wilfley, Washington University in St. Louis, 1899 – senator from Missouri, 1917–1918
- Raymond E. Willis, Wabash College, 1896 – senator from Indiana, 1941–1956

=== U.S. House ===
- Neil Abercrombie, Union, 1959 – representative from Hawaii 1986–1987, 1991–2010
- John Alexander Anderson, Miami University (Ohio), 1853 – representative from Kansas, 1879–1886
- William B. Bankhead, University of Alabama, 1893 – former Speaker of the House, representative from Alabama, 1917–1940
- Douglas Barnard, Mercer University, 1943 – representative from Georgia, 1977–1992
- Berkley Bedell, Iowa State University, 1944 – representative from Iowa, 1975–1987
- Chris Bell, University of Texas, 1988 – representative from Texas, 2002–2004
- Richard Walker Bolling, University of South, 1937 – representative from Missouri, 1949–1982
- Charles G. Bond, Ohio State University, 1899 – representative from New York, 1921–1922
- Edward J. Bonin, Dickinson College, 1933 – representative from Pennsylvania, 1953–1954
- William G. Brantley, University of Georgia, 1881 – representative from Georgia, 1897–1912
- Jim Broyhill, University of North Carolina, 1950 – representative from North Carolina, 1963–1984
- Bradley Byrne, Duke University, 1977 – representative from Alabama, 2014–2021
- Howard Callaway, Georgia Tech, 1948 – representative from Georgia, 1965–1966
- Frank Ertel Carlyle, University of North Carolina, 1920 – representative from North Carolina, 1949–1956
- James M. Collins, Southern Methodist University, 1937 – representative from Texas, 1967–1982
- Barber Conable, Cornell, 1943 – president of the World Bank; Congressman from New York, 1965–85
- Robert J. Corbett, Allegheny College, 1927 – representative from Pennsylvania, 1939–1972
- Jim Courter, Colgate University, 1963 – representative from New Jersey, 1979–1990
- Edwin R. Durno, University of Oregon, 1921 – representative from Oregon, 1961–1962
- John Fleming, Jr., Ole Miss, 1973 – representative from Louisiana, 2009–2017
- Charles K. Fletcher, Stanford University, 1924 – representative from California, 1947–1949
- Wyche Fowler, Davidson College, 1962 – representative from Georgia, 1977–1986
- Burton L. French, University of Idaho, 1901 – representative from Idaho, 1903–1932
- James G. Fulton, Penn State, 1924 – representative from Pennsylvania, 1945–1972
- Charles Goodell, Williams College, 1949 – representative from New York, 1959–1970
- Oscar Lee Gray, University of Alabama, 1885 – representative from Alabama, 1915–1917
- Francis M. Griffith, Franklin College, 1874 – representative from Indiana, 1897–1904
- James M. Griggs, Vanderbilt University, 1881 – representative from Georgia, 1897–1910
- Andrew H. Hamilton, Wabash College, 1855 – representative from Indiana, 1875–1878
- Thomas W. Hardwick, Mercer University, 1892 – representative from Georgia, 1903–1918
- Rufus Hardy, University of Georgia, 1875 – representative from Texas, 1907–1922
- Joel Hefley, Oklahoma State, 1959 – representative from Colorado, 1987–2007
- William M. Howard, University of Georgia, 1877 – representative from Georgia, 1897–1910
- Jared Huffman, UC Santa Barbara, 1986 – representative from California, 2013–present
- John Jarman, Westminster College, 1936 – representative from Oklahoma, 1951–1976
- Royal C. Johnson, University of South Dakota, 1906 – representative from South Dakota, 1915–1932
- John L. Kennedy, Knox College, 1883 – representative from Nebraska, 1905–1906
- Frank Kratovil, McDaniel College, 1990 – representative from Maryland, 2009–2011
- Charles M. La Follette, Wabash College, 1920 – representative from Indiana, 1943–1946
- Gordon Lee, Emory University, 1880 – representative from Georgia, 1905–1926
- William Lemke, University of North Dakota, 1903 – representative from North Dakota, 1933–1950
- Pete McCloskey, Stanford University, 1951 – author of the Endangered Species Act; representative from California, 1967–1983
- Robert C. McEwen, University of Vermont, 1942 – representative from New York, 1965–1980
- Charles F. McLaughlin, University of Nebraska, 1908 – representative from Nebraska, 1935–1942
- James McNulty, Arizona, 1950 – representative from Arizona, 1983–1985
- Luke Messer, Wabash College, 1991 – representative from Indiana, 2013–2019
- Walt Minnick, Whitman College, 1958 – representative from Idaho, 2009–2011
- Chester Mize, University of Kansas, 1939 – representative from Kansas, 1965–1970
- Martin A. Morrison, Butler University, 1883 – representative from Indiana 1910–1916
- Charles L. Moses, Mercer University, 1876 – representative from Georgia, 1891–1896
- Frederick A. Muhlenberg, Gettysburg College, 1908 – representative from Pennsylvania, 1947–1948
- William B. Oliver, University of Alabama, 1887– representative from Alabama, 1915–1936
- James W. Overstreet, Mercer University, 1888 – representative from Georgia, 1905–1922
- Jim Ramstad, University of Minnesota – representative from Minnesota, 1991–2009
- Dwight L. Rogers, Mercer University, 1910 – representative from Florida, 1945–1954
- Paul G. Rogers, University of Florida, 1942 – representative from Florida, 1955–1978
- David Rouzer, North Carolina State, 1994 – representative from North Carolina, 2015–present
- Max Sandlin, Baylor, 1975 – representative from Texas, 1997–2004
- Jouette Shouse, University of Missouri, 1899 – representative from Illinois, 1915–1918
- Garner E. Shriver, Wichita State University, 1934 – representative from Kansas, 1961–1976
- Jim Slattery, Washburn University, 1970 – representative from Kansas, 1983–1995
- Albert L. Smith Jr., Auburn University, 1953 – representative from Alabama, 1981–1983
- Adlai E. Stevenson, Centre College, 1860 – representative from Illinois, 1875–1880
- Willis Sweet, University of Nebraska, 1879 – representative from Idaho, 1889–1894
- Clark W. Thompson, University of Oregon, 1918 – representative from Texas, 1933–1966
- Edwin Keith Thomson, University of Wyoming, 1939 – representative from Wyoming, 1955–1960
- Samuel Tribble, University of Georgia, 1891 – representative from Georgia, 1911–1916
- Frederick M. Vinson, Centre College, 1909 – representative from Kentucky, 1924–1928, 1930–1937
- Francis E. Walter, Lafayette College, 1916 – representative from Pennsylvania, 1933–1964
- Thomas B. Ward, Miami University (Ohio), 1855 – representative from Indiana, 1883–1886

=== State ===
- Byron G. Allen, Iowa State, 1924 – member of the Iowa House of Representatives from 1926-1933; first gubernatorial nominee for the newly formed Minnesota Democratic–Farmer–Labor Party in 1944
- John Fleming, Jr., Ole Miss, 1973 – Louisiana State Treasurer, 2024–present; former U.S. Representative
- Ralph Haben, University of Florida – former Speaker of the Florida House of Representatives
- Adam Hasner, University of Maryland, 1991 – House Majority Leader, Florida House of Representatives, 2002–2010
- John F. Hayes, Washburn University – majority leader, Kansas House of Representatives
- Jim Herring, University of Mississippi 1960 – state chairman of the Mississippi Republican Party 2001–2008; state circuit court judge, 1997–1999
- Thomas M. Honan, Indiana University Bloomington, 1899 – Speaker of the Indiana House of Representatives; Indiana Attorney General
- Warren W. Shaw, Washburn University, 1931 – Kansas House of Representatives
- Shap Smith, University of Vermont, 1987 – 92nd Speaker of the Vermont House of Representatives
- Robert Stone, Washburn University, 1889 – Speaker of the Kansas House of Representatives, 1915
- Joshua Soule Zimmerman, Randolph–Macon College, 1892 – West Virginia House Delegate

=== Mayor ===
- Jean Baptiste Adoue, University of Texas, 1906 – former mayor of Dallas, Texas
- Arthur "Art" Phillips, University of British Columbia, 1953 – 32nd Mayor of Vancouver, 1973–1977
- Richard Vinroot, University of North Carolina, 1963 – Mayor of Charlotte, North Carolina, 1991–95
- Kevin White, Williams College, 1952 – second longest-serving mayor in Boston history

== Religion ==
- Charles Minnigerode Beckwith – Bishop of Alabama
- Kirkman George Finlay, University of the South, 1900 – first Bishop of the Episcopal Diocese of Upper South Carolina
- Clare Purcell, Emory, 1910 – Bishop of the Methodist Episcopal Church, South
- Ralph W. Sockman, Ohio Wesleyan, 1911 – evangelist, writer
- David Swing, Miami University, 1852 – founder of the Central Church of Chicago

== Science, medicine, and technology ==
- Thomas Francis, Jr., Allegheny College, 1921 – physician, virologist, and epidemiologist; Presidential Medal of Freedom recipient
- Joel Henry Hildebrand, University of Pennsylvania, 1903 – pioneer chemist
- Patrick Piemonte, Purdue University, 2004 – inventor and user interface designer
- William C. Roberts, Southern Methodist University, 1954 – cardiologist and pathologist; first head of pathology for the National Heart, Lung and Blood Institute
- Homer Clyde Snook, Ohio Wesleyan University, 1900 – inventor; electrical engineer

== Sports ==
- Mike Adamle, Northwestern University, 1971 – NFL safety, broadcaster
- Bill Austin, Oregon State College, 1949 – NFL lineman and head coach
- Terry Baker, Oregon State University, 1963 – NFL & CFL quarterback, Heisman Trophy winner, first selection of 1963 NFL draft, NCAA Final Four (basketball)
- Ernest Bearg, Washburn University, 1916 – head football coach, Washburn and University of Nebraska
- Jim Bowden, Rollins College, 1983 – MLB general manager, Cincinnati Reds and Washington Nationals
- Richard R. Baggins, Case Western Reserve, 1901 – MLB pitcher, Cleveland Blues
- Rich Brooks, Oregon State University, 1963 – head football coach, University of Oregon, and St. Louis Rams (NFL), and University of Kentucky
- Randy Brown, University of Florida – MLB catcher
- Dave Burba, Ohio State University, 1988 – MLB pitcher
- Ron Cey, Washington State University, 1970 – MLB third baseman, Los Angeles Dodgers and Chicago Cubs
- Gunther Cunningham, University of Oregon, 1968 – NFL defensive coordinator, Kansas City Chiefs, former head coach
- Alvin Dark, Louisiana State University, 1945 – MLB infielder, manager; Rookie of the Year, 1948
- Dwight F. Davis, Washington University in St. Louis, 1899 – tennis player, namesake of the Davis Cup
- Eugene Davis, University of Virginia, 1899 – football coach; later a surgeon
- Morgan Ensberg, University of Southern California, 1998 – MLB infielder
- Weeb Ewbank, Miami University (Ohio), 1928 – NFL and AFL head coach; Pro Football Hall of Fame
- Scott Fortune, Stanford, 1988 – Olympic gold medalist, volleyball
- Ralph Friedgen, University of Maryland, 1970 – head coach, University of Maryland football
- Gary Gait, Syracuse University, 1990 – lacrosse, multiple All-American and NCAA champion
- Paul Gait, Syracuse University, 1990 – lacrosse, multiple All-American and NCAA champion
- Laddie Gale, University of Oregon, 1939 – Basketball Hall of Fame
- Lou Gehrig, Columbia University, 1925 – MLB first baseman, New York Yankees; Baseball Hall of Fame
- Jack Gelineau, McGill University, 1949 – NHL goaltender, Calder Memorial Trophy winner
- Matt Grevers, Northwestern University, 2007 – Olympic gold medalist, swimming
- Jack Ham, Penn State University, 1971 – NFL All-Pro linebacker, Pittsburgh Steelers, Pro Football Hall of Fame
- Jack Harbaugh, Bowling Green University, 1961 – college football coach
- Tom Harmon, University of Michigan, 1941 – Heisman Trophy winner, broadcaster
- Terry Hoeppner, Franklin College, 1969 – college football coach
- Hughie Jennings, Cornell University, 1904 – MLB infielder, manager, Detroit Tigers, Baseball Hall of Fame
- Wilbur Johns, UCLA, 1925 – UCLA basketball coach and athletic director
- William Johnson, University of Kansas, 1933 – center, Basketball Hall of Fame
- Wallace Jones, University of Kentucky – basketball player
- Harry Kalas, University of Iowa, 1959 – play-by-play announcer for the Philadelphia Phillies
- Bob Locker, Iowa State, 1960 – MLB pitcher, played on 1972 World Series champion Oakland Athletics
- Don Meredith, Southern Methodist University, 1960 – NFL All-Pro quarterback, Dallas Cowboys
- Dick Nolan, University of Maryland, 1955 – former head coach, San Francisco 49ers
- J. T. O'Sullivan, U.C. Davis, 2002 – NFL quarterback, San Francisco 49ers
- Jim Otto, University of Miami, 1960 – NFL center, Oakland Raiders, Pro Football Hall of Fame
- Dave Parks, Texas Tech University, 1964 – NFL wide receiver, first selection of 1964 NFL draft, San Francisco 49ers
- William Porter Payne, University of Georgia, 1969 – president of Atlanta Olympic Committee, chairman of Augusta National Golf Club
- Mike Racy, Washburn University – NCAA VP, MIAA Commissioner
- Detlef Schrempf, University of Washington, 1986 – NBA All-Star forward
- Ted Schroeder, Stanford University, 1942 – tennis player, Wimbledon and US Open champion
- Jason Simontacchi, San Jose State University, 1996 – MLB pitcher, St. Louis Cardinals and Washington Nationals
- Steve Tasker, Northwestern University, 1985 – NFL All-Pro special teams player, wide receiver, Buffalo Bills
- Zach Thomas, Texas Tech University, 1996 – NFL linebacker, Miami Dolphins
- Mike Timlin, Southwestern University, 1988 – MLB pitcher, four World Series championship teams
- Bill Toomey, University of Colorado, 1961 – Olympic gold medalist, 1968 decathlon
- Doak Walker, Southern Methodist University, 1950 – NFL All-Pro halfback, Detroit Lions, 1948 Heisman Trophy winner, Pro Football Hall of Fame
- Wayne Walker, University of Idaho, 1958 – NFL All-Pro linebacker, Detroit Lions (started all 15 seasons)
- Wes Welker, Texas Tech University, 2004 – NFL All-Pro wide receiver, New England Patriots, Denver Broncos
- Gary Williams, University of Maryland, 1968 – head basketball coach, University of Maryland
- Ralph C. Wilson Jr., University of Virginia, 1940 – founder, owner, and president of the Buffalo Bills football team; Pro Football Hall of Fame member, 2009
