= Ronald K. Richey =

Ronald K. Richey (June 16, 1926 – August 25, 2010) was the chairman, president and chief executive officer of Torchmark Corporation.

== Family and education ==
Richey was born in Erie, Kansas in 1926. The youngest of five boys, his brothers were Marion, Earle, Jr., Keith, and Leland. His father owned a drug store where Richey worked. After serving in the Army Air Corps during World War II, he received his undergraduate degree from Washburn University in 1949 and a law degree from Washburn Law in 1951. In 1989, the school awarded him an honorary doctorate of commerce. While an undergraduate he was initiated into the Kansas Beta chapter of Phi Delta Theta. During law school he was a member of the law fraternity Delta Theta Phi.

Richey was married to Florence (Kane) Richey. The Richeys met at Washburn where Florence was a member of Delta Gamma. Their children are Robert Richey, a retired insurance executive and founding member of the McHeadley Society, Chris Richey, CEO of Neosho Capital, and Linda Richey Graves. Linda is married to former Kansas Governor Bill Graves. The couple had six grandchildren.

== Career ==
After graduating from Washburn in 1951, Richey served as an attorney with the Kansas Insurance Department and later as legislative manager for the American Mutual Insurance Alliance of Chicago, Illinois. In 1964, he joined Globe Life And Accident Insurance Company in Oklahoma City as vice president and general counsel. He was eventually elected chairman and chief executive officer and maintained that position until 1980.

Globe Life was purchased by Torchmark Corporation (hereafter referred to as "Torchmark" or "The Company"), and in 1982 Richey was elected president of the Birmingham, Alabama-based Torchmark Corporation. On January 1, 1985, Richey was named president and chief executive officer of Torchmark Corporation. Under Richey’s leadership, Torchmark successfully integrated several of the companies it had spent more than half a billion dollars to acquire during a buying spree in the late 1970s and early 1980s. These acquisitions included Globe Life And Accident Insurance Company, Continental Investment Corporation, and United American Insurance Company. Continental owned Waddell & Reed and United Investors Life Insurance Company.

While many other insurance providers were lured into the high-return, high-risk junk bond, and commercial real estate markets of the 1980s, Torchmark maintained three-fourths of its invested assets in reliable, government-guaranteed securities and short-term investments. When the bottom fell out of the junk bond and real estate markets in the late 1980s, Torchmark emerged unscathed. Torchmark's conservative investment strategies earned its primary subsidiaries the industry's highest ratings. The national scandals, however, did affect The Company, in the form of increased contributions to the federal guaranty fund to bail out insolvent insurers.

The 1990s began promisingly for Torchmark, as 1992 marked The Company's forty-first consecutive year of growth. By then, its stock price had shot up an astronomical 1,675% from its 1980 levels. In 1994, however, The Company experienced some setbacks. In large part as a result of some poorly performing investments and the fallout from several different legal disputes in Alabama stemming from alleged misconduct by Agents at Liberty National Life Insurance Company, The Company's growth streak was snapped. Revenues declined to $1.9 billion from 1993's $2.2 billion and net income dropped $31 million from 1993's results, to $269 million.

1994 also saw some alterations in The Company's business balance as Torchmark made the strategic decision to focus more heavily on its life insurance operations at the expense of its health insurance ones (life insurance products tended to have higher operating margins, build better assets, and be under less year-to-year growth pressure). Buoyed by the acquisition of American Family Life Insurance Company for $552 million in November of that year, Torchmark's life insurance revenues jumped 16% from 1993's levels, while the health insurance sector contracted by 31.2% over the same period.

The restructuring of 1994 helped stanch the decline in Torchmark's revenues, as 1995 sales climbed to $2.1 billion, recouping nearly all of the 1993-94 drop. Net income, however, declined nearly 47% from 1994 ($143 million) as a result of poor growth in the Medicare supplemental insurance sector along with The Company's litigation exposure, heavy debt burden from the American Family Life acquisition, and underperforming oil and gas investments. (The Medicare business had been slumping ever since federal legislation enacted in 1992 capped the commissions that vendors of such policies could charge.) To remedy this situation as best it could, Torchmark opted to divest itself of its holdings in the energy industry to streamline its operations and dedicate itself more effectively to its core insurance, mutual fund, and asset management businesses. In 1995, Torchmark liquidated its investments in Torch Energy Advisors, Inc., the Black Warrior coal mine, and its holdings in Nuevo Energy Co.

Richey retired as CEO in March 1998 and chairman in 2002.

== Other activities and interests ==
Richey was active in a number of industry and charitable activities. He was a former president of the Association of Oklahoma Life Insurance Companies, a former director of the American Council of Life and Health Insurance and board member for the National Cowboy Hall of Fame and Western Heritage Center.

From 1982 to 1999 he was a trustee of the Washburn Endowment Association and later a trustee emeritus. He was also a former member of the Washburn Law board of governors. Richey and his wife were the benefactors of the Richey Scholars Program at Washburn, making them one of the university's most generous donors in its history. Around the time of his graduation from law school, Richey joined together with eight other Phi Delta Theta fraternity brothers to form the "Free Society of GNIP-GNOP." For more than fifty years, this group has sponsored prizes for best note and comment at Washburn Law.

Richey previously served on the board of directors of Full House Resorts. From 1998 until 2004, Full House was led by CEO William P. McComas. McComas and Richey were fraternity brothers at Washburn.

== Honors and recognition ==
Richey received numerous awards for both his professional accomplishments and philanthropic endeavors including:

- Distinguished Service Award from Washburn University, 1993
- Bronze Award Winner, Insurance Diversified Category, CEO of the Year, 1993
- Bronze Award Winner, Insurance Diversified Category, CEO of the Year, 1992
- Silver Award Winner, Insurance Life/Health Category, CEO of the Year, 1991
- First Place Winner, Finance Industry CEO of the Year, Financial World, 1990
- Outstanding Insurance Executive, 1991
- Honorary Doctor of Commerce, Washburn University, 1989
- First Place Winner, CEO of the Decade, Financial World, 1989
- Kansan of Distinction, Topeka Capital Journal, 1987
