= National Income Life Insurance Company =

American insurance company

- Type: Subsidiary of Globe Life
- Industry: Life insurance
- Founded: 2000; 26 years ago
- Headquarters: Liverpool, New York, United States
- Area served: New York
- Key people: Steven K. Greer, CEO
- Products: supplemental health and life insurance
- Parent: American Income Life Insurance Company, Globe Life
- Website: www.nilife.com

National Income Life Insurance Company (NILICO) is an American insurance company providing supplemental life insurance to members of labor unions, credit unions, and associations. The company is based in Rochester, New York and is a subsidiary of American Income Life Insurance Company which is a subsidiary of Globe Life.

== History ==
NILICO's parent company, the insurance American Income Life (AIL), was founded more than 50 years ago by Bernard Rapoport with $25,000 of borrowed capital.

NILICO products include life insurance, accident & supplementary health insurance and safe kit for children at no cost.
