= Liberty National Life Complex =

- Interactive map of the Liberty National Life Complex area

General information
- Status: Completed
- Type: Corporate Office
- Location: 2011 Third Avenue South Birmingham, Alabama, USA
- Coordinates: 33.510014°N 86.801796°W
- Opening: Building One: 1925; Building Two: 1952
- Owner: Torchmark Corporation
- Operator: Torchmark Corporation

Height
- Antenna spire: Building One: 143 feet (44 m)
- Top floor: Building One: 10; Building Two: 16

Technical details
- Floor count: Building One: 10; Building Two: 16
- Floor area: 487,000 square feet (45,244 m^{2})

Design and construction
- Architect: Building One:Warren Knight & Davis
- Main contractor: Building Two:Brice Building Company

The Liberty National Life Complex, is a corporate office complex located in downtown Birmingham, Alabama. The complex is made up of two connecting buildings. The original building was built in 1925 and contains 10 stories. The second building, a 16-story building, was originally built in 1952 as a 10-story building, but was expanded in 1971 by six stories. The complex served as the corporate headquarters of Torchmark Corporation and its predecessor company, Liberty National Life, from 1925 until 2006.

== Background ==
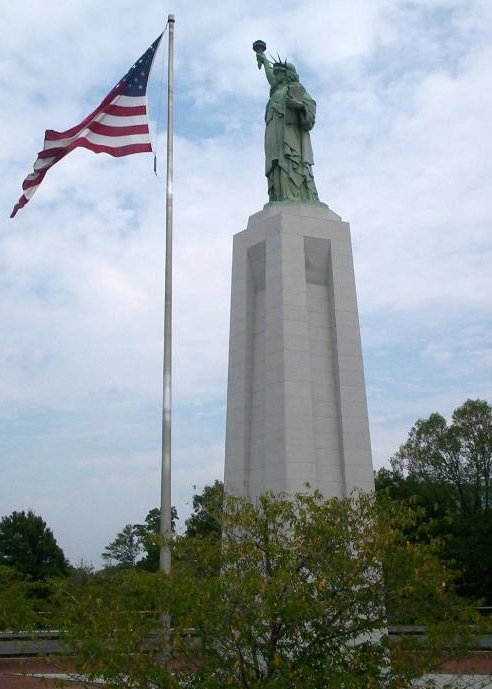
A replica of the Statue of Liberty located in Liberty Park, Alabama. The statue sat atop the Liberty National Life Building until 1989.

The original 10 story building, built in 1925 contained, a replica of the Statue of Liberty located on a pedestal at the top of the building. The 36-foot (11 m) tall statue was moved to the Urban Center, an office complex off of Interstate 459 in Liberty Park, Alabama in 1989. Liberty Park is a commercial, residential and retail development between Torchmark Development Company and Drummond Company.

The south side of the complex's 16 story building contains a large version of the company's "Torch" Logo, which is the logo of both Liberty National and Torchmark. It is not often seen due to the company's 10 story parking deck that, built in 1991, that is located opposite the logo.

== See also ==
- Liberty National Life
- Birmingham, Alabama
- List of tallest buildings in Birmingham, Alabama
