= Jenn Brown =

American sports broadcaster and television host

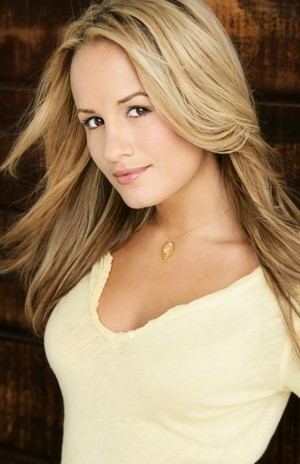
- Brown in 2009
- Born: Jennifer Lynne Brown; March 23, 1981 (age 45); Gainesville, Florida, U.S.
- Education: University of Florida
- Occupations: Sports broadcaster, television host
- Height: 1.61 m (5 ft 3 in)
- Spouse: Wes Chatham (m. 2012)
- Children: 2
- Website: www.jennbrown.com

Jennifer Lynne Brown (born March 23, 1981) is an American sports broadcaster and television host. A former Division I collegiate athlete for the University of Florida, she spent eight years as a reporter and host for ESPN and American Ninja Warrior.

Brown spent two years working for the NFL Network as a studio host and reporter. She also served as a reporter for College GameDay, the College World Series, Little League World Series, Summer and Winter X Games, and the ESPYs. She was a Los Angeles-based Bureau reporter for ESPN contributing interviews and reports for ESPN’s news-gathering operation for SportsCenter, College GameDay and College Football Live. She co-hosted ESPNU's college football show RoadTrip with Jonathan Drubner.

== Early life and education ==
Brown was born in Gainesville, Florida and raised in Orlando, Florida. Her parents were Olympic gymnastics coaches, and her mother founded several gymnastics schools across the country that trained gymnasts to compete in the Olympics.

Brown grew up with a passion for sports. She played seven sports at Bishop Moore High School and broke the record for the most varsity letters by a male or female athlete with 14. Brown captained and played five sports in one year (diving, volleyball, basketball, softball and track). She was also chosen as one of the top 10 athletes in Central Florida in 1999.

On August 7, 2000, Brown's younger sister Carrie was killed in a car accident at the age of 13.

Brown went on to attend the University of Florida on an academic scholarship and played four years on the Florida Gators softball team. Brown captained the team her senior year, and she finished fifth on the team's career stolen base list.

Brown received several academic honors while at the University of Florida including being named a two time National Fastpitch Coaches Association (NFCA) Academic All-American, four time SEC Academic Honor Roll, National Society of Collegiate Honors, Verizon Academic All-District, two time academic Dean's List and two time academic President's List.

Brown graduated summa cum laude and was planning to attend law school to become a sports agent, but got her big break hosting a travel TV show on HDNet called The Wild Side, which was a remake of the famous show Wild On on E!.

== Personal life ==
Brown resides in Los Angeles, California. She is married to actor Wes Chatham. Together they have two sons, John Nash, born in 2014, and Rhett Jameson, born in 2016.

== Career ==
=== TV hosting ===
From 2003 to 2008, Brown has hosted various episodes of the Hdnet reality TV show, Bikini Destinations. Prior to ESPN, Brown worked for Showtime Sports as a reporter in 2008 and 2009. Brown was a special correspondent on Inside the NFL for 2 seasons, which won an Emmy Award for Outstanding Studio Show in 2008. She was also a live event reporter for boxing and MMA events for both Showtime Sports and CBS. In 2009, Brown was one of the hosts on ABC's Primetime show The Superstars.

Brown worked for E! Entertainment the summer of 2008 as a correspondent on E! News Now. Prior to joining E!, Brown hosted shows for networks like CBS, ESPN, CMT and HDNet. She was the host for a nationally syndicated Mountain Lifestyle show called 48 Straight, The Mountain Experience, which she hosted with Jonny Moseley. Brown also co-hosted with Moseley The Collegiate Nationals for CBS Sports. In 2007, she hosted the reality TV show I Want To Look Like a High School Cheerleader Again on Country Music Television.

She was a co-host on the NBC and Esquire Network summer primetime show American Ninja Warrior, as well as hosting A Football Life: Backstory and NFL GameDay Scoreboard on the NFL Network.

=== Acting work ===
Her acting credit includes Two Tickets to Paradise, which was written, produced, starred and directed by D. B. Sweeney. She's also appeared in 2 episodes of the TV show Kingdom on DirecTV playing herself.

=== Modeling ===
Brown has been featured in several ad campaigns for Under Armour's athletic clothing line.

== See also ==
- Florida Gators
- List of University of Florida alumni
