= Globe Life Insurance Company of New York =

- Company type: Subsidiary of Globe Life
- Industry: Life insurance
- Founded: 1981; 45 years ago
- Headquarters: Syracuse, New York, United States
- Area served: New York State
- Key people: Vern D. Herbel, CEO; Michael C. Majors, President
- Products: Supplemental health and life insurance
- Parent: Globe Life
- Website: www.globelifeofnewyork.com

Globe Life Insurance Company of New York is an American insurance company based in Syracuse, New York. The company is a subsidiary of financial services holding company Globe Life (NYSE: GL), based in McKinney, Texas.

== History ==
In 1981, as the United American Insurance Company, the company became a member of Globe Life, a financial services holding company, listed on the New York Stock ExchangeNYSE: GL. United American was chartered that year as a result of their business spreading across the United States. First UA wrote its first life insurance policy in 1986.

In 2011, First United American earned the A+ (Superior) Financial Rating from A. M. Best Company. It was downgraded to A (Excellent) in 2020.

In 2019, Globe Life Insurance Company of New York was fined by the Department of Financial Services in the state of New York for improperly denying benefits to policyholders. This was under Liverpool life insurance which was a brand of Torchmark Corporation which was a subsidiary and the previous name of Globe Life. Globe Life had to pay a fine of $439,000, in addition to the restitution of over $7.3 million which it had agreed to pay to the beneficiaries.
