= Globe Life Liberty National Division =

Health insurance provider in Texas, United States

- Formerly: Liberty National Life Insurance
- Company type: Subsidiary
- Industry: Insurance
- Founded: 1900; 126 years ago in Birmingham, Alabama
- Headquarters: McKinney, Texas, United States
- Area served: United States
- Key people: Steven J DiChiaro CEO
- Products: Supplemental health and life insurance
- Parent: Globe Life
- Rating: A+
- Website: www.globelifelibertynational.com

Globe Life Liberty National Division (formerly Liberty National Life Insurance) is an American insurance company that is a provider of life and supplemental health insurance. It provides individual coverage through home and workplace sales. The company is headquartered McKinney, Texas and is licensed in 49 states and is a subsidiary of Globe Life. Liberty National was founded in Birmingham, Alabama, in 1900.

== History ==
Liberty National traces its origin back to August 27, 1900, when its predecessor was founded as the Heralds of Liberty, a fraternal organization founded on the principles of respect for the law, observance of cardinal Christian virtues, loyalty to government, and practical exemplification of brotherhood.

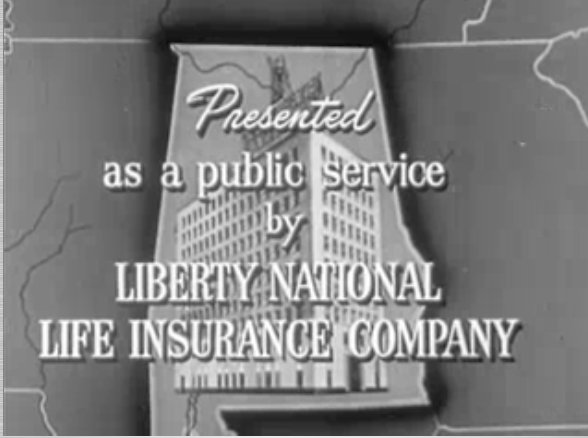
Liberty National logo shown on Warner Pathe newsreels in the 1950s.

Later in June 1921, the name was changed to Liberty Life Assurance Company by deputy insurance commissioner Robert Davison and Frank Samford. In 1929, LNL was incorporated as a stock company and its name was changed to Liberty National Life Insurance Company.

The Liberty National Holding Company, created in 1979, expanded by acquiring United American, along with Globe Life and Accident Insurance Company and American Income Life. In the 1980s, the Liberty National Insurance Holding Company became Torchmark Corporation which then became Globe Life on August 8, 2019.
