= Choctaw Stadium =

Stadium in Arlington, Texas, US

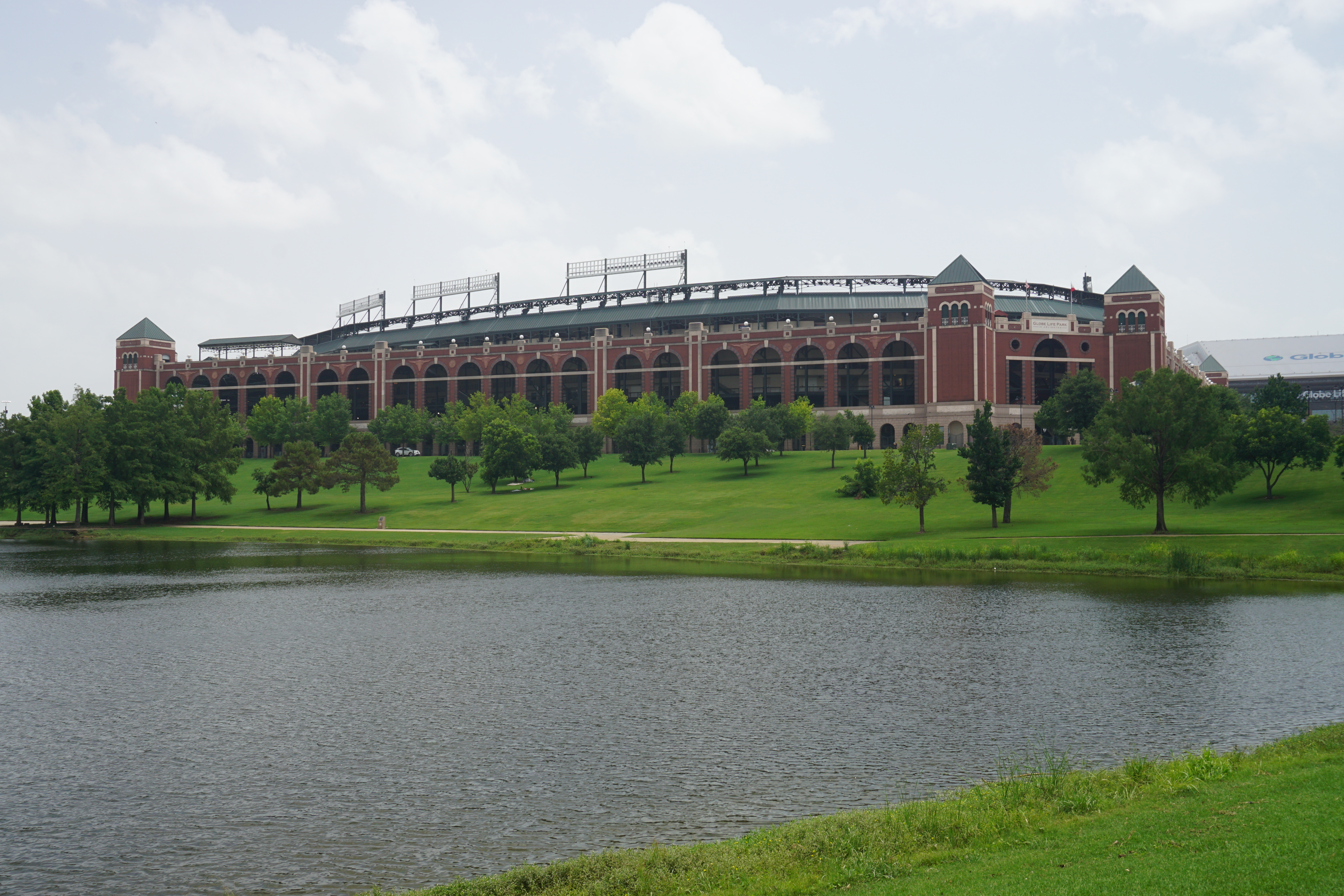
- Choctaw Stadium in 2020 (as Globe Life Park in Arlington)

- Location within Texas Location within the United States
- Interactive map of Choctaw Stadium
- Former names: Globe Life Park in Arlington (2014–2021); Rangers Ballpark in Arlington (2007–2013); Ameriquest Field in Arlington (2005–2006); The Ballpark in Arlington (1994–2004)
- Address: 1000 Ballpark Way
- Location: Arlington, Texas, United States
- Coordinates: 32°45′5″N 97°4′58″W
- Owner: City of Arlington
- Operator: Rangers Baseball Express
- Capacity: 48,114 (baseball); 25,000 (football)
- Executive suites: 120
- Surface: Latitude36 Bermuda Grass
- Record attendance: 52,419
- Public transit: Collins Street at Andrews Street

Construction
- Groundbreaking: April 2, 1992
- Opened: April 1, 1994
- Cost: $191 million ($415 million in 2025)
- Architects: David M. Schwarz Architectural Services, Inc.; HKS, Inc. (architect of record); SBL Architecture, Inc.
- Structural engineers: Walter P Moore; Datum
- Services engineers: M–E Engineers, Inc.; Dunn Consulting
- General contractor: Manhattan Construction Company

Tenants
- Texas Rangers (MLB) 1994–2019; North Texas SC (MLSNP) 2020–2025; Dallas/Arlington Renegades (XFL/UFL) 2020, 2023–2025; Dallas Jackals (MLR) 2022–2024

Choctaw Stadium, formerly Globe Life Park, is a multi-purpose stadium in Arlington, Texas, United States. The venue opened in April 1994 as a baseball stadium with the name The Ballpark in Arlington, serving as the home for the Texas Rangers of Major League Baseball from 1994 through 2019. It replaced the nearby Arlington Stadium, and was succeeded by Globe Life Field.

In 2020, the stadium was retrofitted for football and soccer. It served as the home of the North Texas SC of MLS Next Pro (FC Dallas's reserve team) until 2025. The stadium will serve as the headquarters of amusement park company Six Flags following the company's planned relocation; Six Flags has been a tenant at the stadium since 2020.

== History ==
In April 1989, Rangers owner Eddie Chiles sold the team to an investment group headed by George W. Bush. The aging Arlington Stadium was outdated and did not have amenities that helped make other baseball franchises more profitable. As a result, the team could not compete with other big-city teams for good players. In an effort to fund the project through public money instead of private financing, the Rangers threatened to leave Arlington. The city of Arlington spent $150,000 on an advertising campaign to persuade voters to approve the funding through a referendum by printing brochures, placing telemarketing calls, and planning a "Hands Around Arlington Day." On January 19, 1991, over 65% of voters approved the deal, allowing the city government to cover 71% of the costs ($135 million out of $191 million) of building the new ballpark. The deal called for the city to raise the sales tax by half a cent to go toward construction. Both houses of the Texas Legislature unanimously approved the public purpose of the ballpark, and Texas Governor Ann Richards signed it all into law.

As part of the deal, the city created a separate corporation, the Arlington Sports Facilities Development Authority (ASFDA), to manage construction. Using authority granted to it by the city, the ASFDA seized several tracts of land around the stadium site using eminent domain for parking and future development.

Construction on the stadium, which was dubbed The Ballpark in Arlington, began on April 2, 1992, a short distance away from Arlington Stadium, the stadium it would replace, and the new Ballpark in Arlington opened on April 1, 1994, in an exhibition contest between the Rangers and the New York Mets. The first official game was on April 11 against the Milwaukee Brewers.

Ameriquest bought the naming rights to the ballpark on May 7, 2004, and renamed it Ameriquest Field in Arlington. The Rangers severed their relationship with Ameriquest on March 19, 2007, and announced the park would be renamed Rangers Ballpark in Arlington.

The largest crowd to watch a Rangers baseball game was on October 30, 2010, when 52,419 fans watched Game 3 of the 2010 World Series against the San Francisco Giants.

Globe Life and Accident Insurance Company, a subsidiary of McKinney-based Globe Life, bought the naming rights for the facility on February 5, 2014, naming it Globe Life Park in Arlington.

On May 20, 2016, the Rangers announced that they intended to move from Globe Life Park to the new Globe Life Field, beginning with the 2020 season. The new air conditioned stadium was slated to feature a retractable roof, which many argued could increase stadium revenue from those who would otherwise not want to sit in the heat during games as the season progresses throughout the hot Texas summer, in particular those that occur in the afternoon. Voting for the new ballpark began on November 8 (the same day as the 2016 presidential election) for residents in the city limits of Arlington. The ballpark was passed with a 60% favorable vote. The stadium opened in the 2020 season.

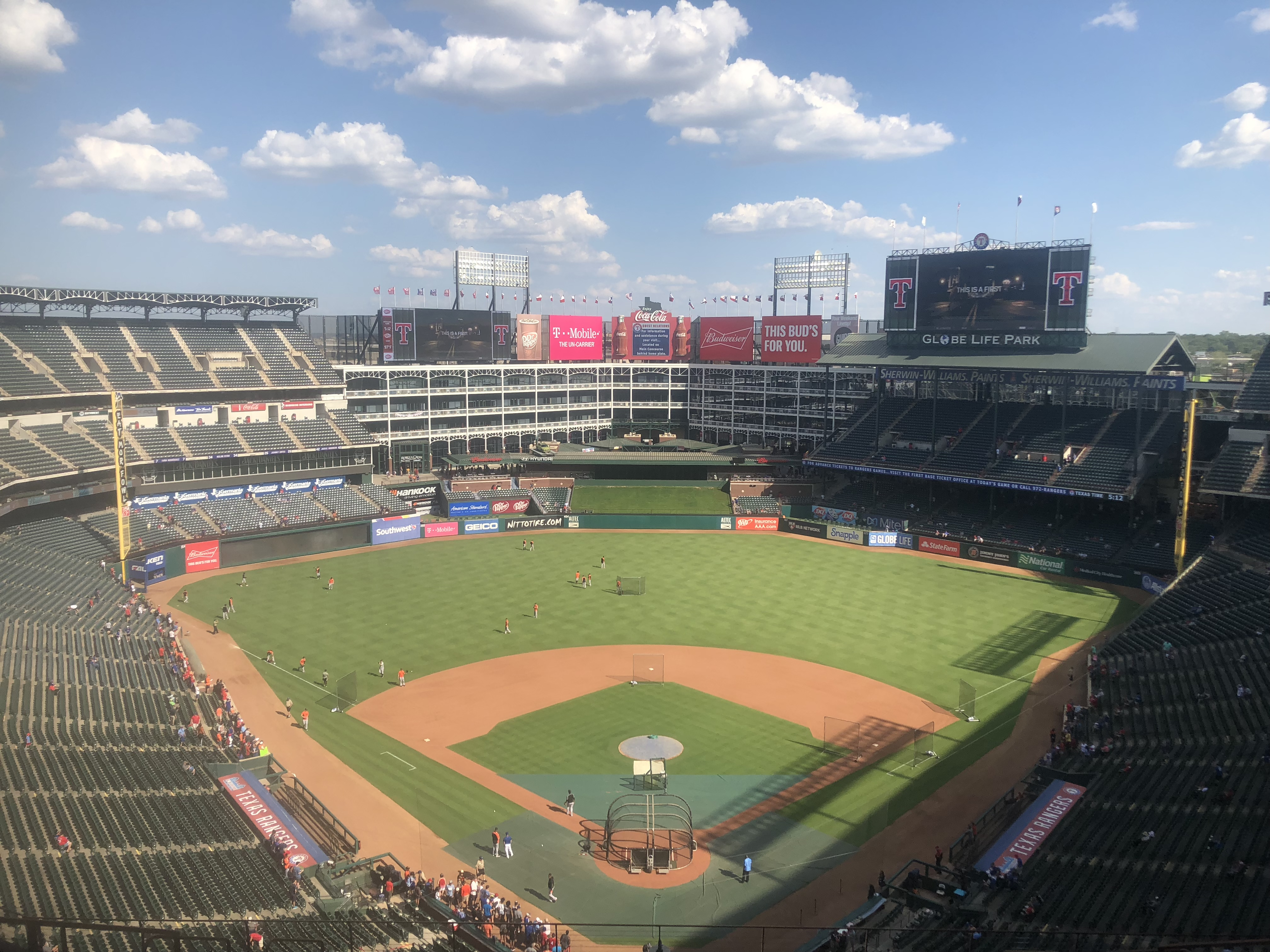
Choctaw Stadium, then Globe Life Park, in 2018

The new stadium was built south of Globe Life Park, on the site of a surface parking lot between Randol Mill Road and Cowboys Way. Space between the new stadium and Globe Life Park was constructed into an entertainment complex called Texas Live!, developed by The Cordish Companies, which, when finished, is slated to include sports bars, restaurants, and a 300-room hotel to be developed in three phases. The first phase, dubbed "Rangers Republic", is a two-level venue with multiple restaurants and providing interactive games and authentic memorabilia; the second phase is the Live! Arena, a multi-level venue providing restaurants, a performance stage for concerts, and an outdoor beer garden; Arlington Backyard, the third venue to anchor the entertainment district calls for a large, covered venue that could host concerts, charitable functions, and community events.

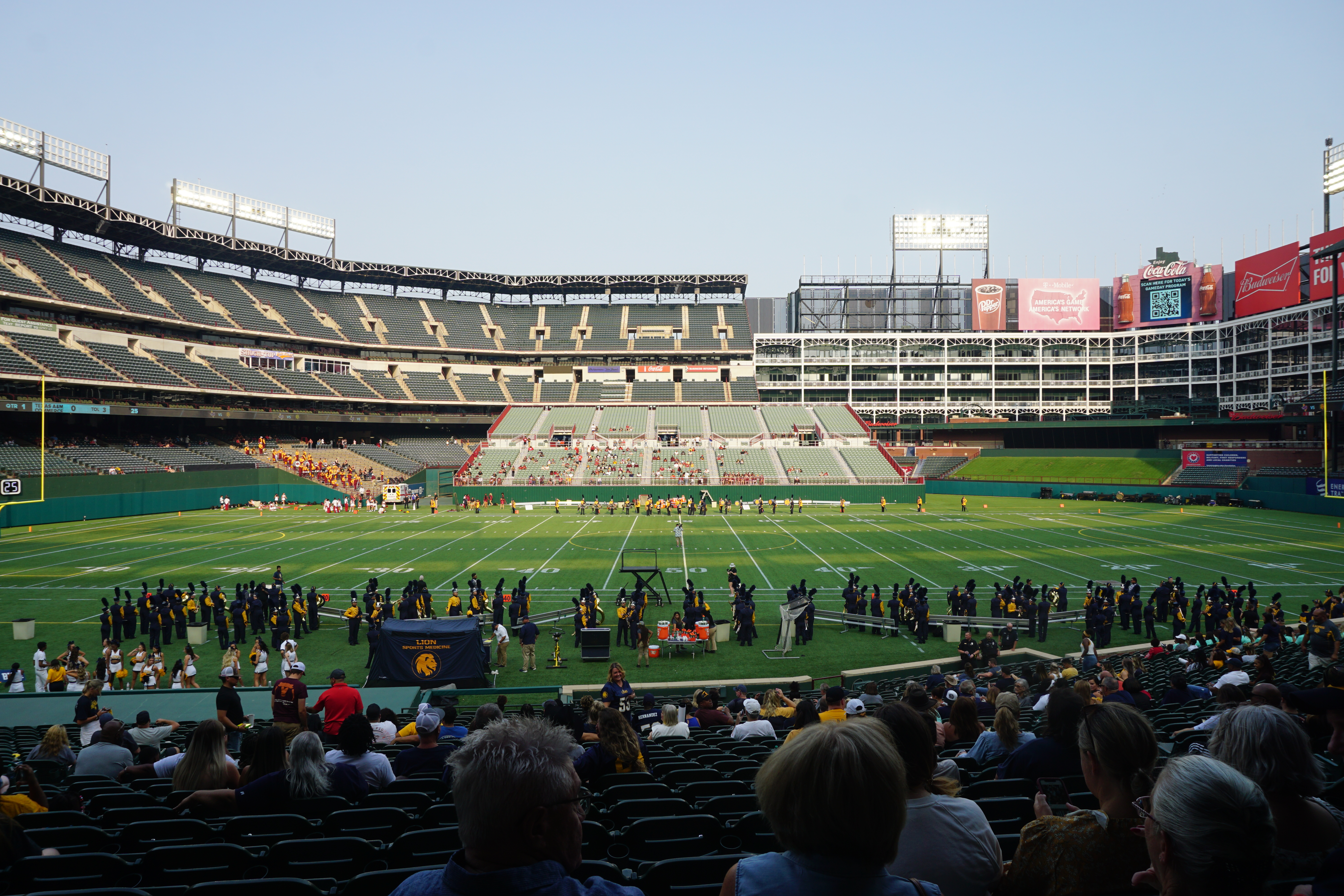
Choctaw Stadium before the Midwestern State Mustangs vs. Texas A&M–Commerce Lions football game in 2021

Unlike Arlington Stadium, Choctaw Stadium was not demolished. Originally, city officials announced that they would redevelop the structure as part of the Texas Live! complex. The redevelopment would have retained the ballpark's outfield office complex and facade, and most of the concourse would have been re-purposed. Potential uses included redeveloping the concourse for condos and retail, as well as turning the current field into an amphitheater. On December 5, 2018, city officials announced that the stadium would become the home of the Dallas Renegades of the new XFL, beginning with the league's debut in 2020. North Texas SC, a USL League 1 team also announced they would play at the renovated stadium. Many of the park's lower sections, mostly on the third base side, were removed to make room for the rectangular field which sits horizontally when viewed from behind the home plate. New seats were then added to where the ballpark's outfield once lay.

On September 29, 2019, after the Rangers' last home game against the New York Yankees, home plate was removed and transferred to the new park. The renovation project of the stadium from a baseball facility into a football and soccer facility began in October.

On August 25, 2021, Choctaw Casinos & Resorts bought the naming rights to the stadium.

In December 2019, Six Flags announced that it would move its corporate headquarters in 2020 to the Centerfield Office Building located within the stadium, formerly occupied by the Rangers. It was the company's headquarters until the 2024 merger with Cedar Fair, moving to Charlotte, North Carolina. Following the merger, it was one of the new Six Flags company's corporate offices before announcing it will move its headquarters back into Choctaw Stadium by March 2027.

== Features ==
=== Design ===
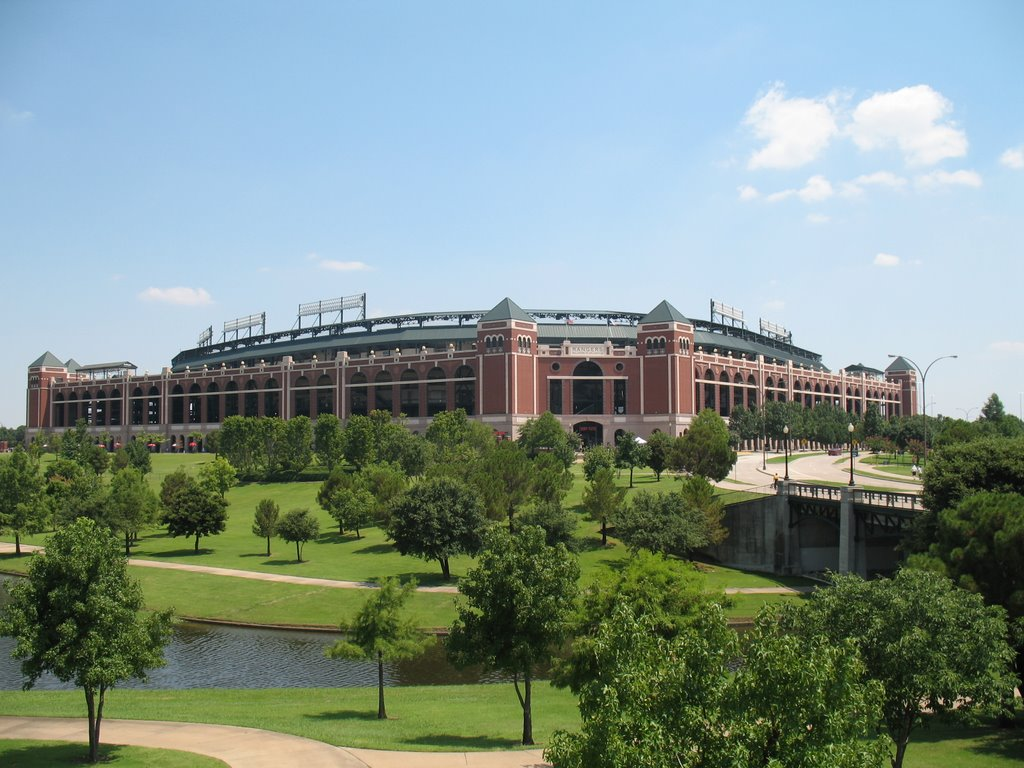
Park by the home plate entrance at Choctaw Stadium

The stadium was designed by the Driehaus Prize winner and New Classical architect David M. Schwarz of Washington, D.C. The Rangers chose to build a retro-style ballpark (Retro-classic, or Retro-modern), incorporating many features of baseball's Jewel Box parks. A roofed home run porch in right field is reminiscent of Tiger Stadium, while the white steel frieze that surrounds the upper deck was copied from the pre-1973 Yankee Stadium. The out-of-town scoreboard (removed in 2009 and replaced with a state-of-the-art video board) was built into the left-field wall—a nod to Fenway Park. The numerous nooks and crannies in the outfield fence are a reminder of Ebbets Field. The arched windows are a reminder of Comiskey Park.

However, it has a few distinct features of its own. Several traditional Texas-style stone carvings are visible throughout. A four-story office building encloses center field with a white steel multilevel facade similar to the facade on the roof.

As the stadium was built on one of the former Arlington Stadium parking lots, the irregular dimensions of the outfield were planned independently, rather than being forced by neighboring structures. The home plate, foul poles (replaced prior to the 2016 season), and bleachers were originally at Arlington Stadium. The Home Plate was inserted into place by Richard Greene (then Mayor of Arlington), Elzie Odom (Head of Arlington Home Run Committee and later Mayor of Arlington), and George W. Bush (former part Rangers owner, later Texas Governor and President of the United States).

The stadium's 810-foot (250 m)-long facades are made of brick and Texas Sunset Red granite. Bas-relief friezes depict significant scenes from the history of both Texas and baseball. The calculus of seating arrangements represented a new economic model for the sport: a critical mass of high-dollar seats close to the infield boost ticket revenue. The stadium has three basic seating tiers: lower, club and upper deck. Two levels of luxury suites occupy spaces behind sliding glass doors above and below the club tier.

The stadium has a large number of obstructed-view seats. In some cases, the view is cut off by an overhang or underhang, and others are directly in front of support poles. Also, the design of the upper deck left it one of the highest in baseball. The view from the grandstand reserved sections in left is particularly obstructed.

Prior to the 2012 season, the visitor bullpen was reconfigured to be parallel to the field after the previous visitor bullpen configuration had an excessive amount of heat during hot weather games. To allow construction, a few rows of bleacher sections were removed.

==== Greene's Hill ====
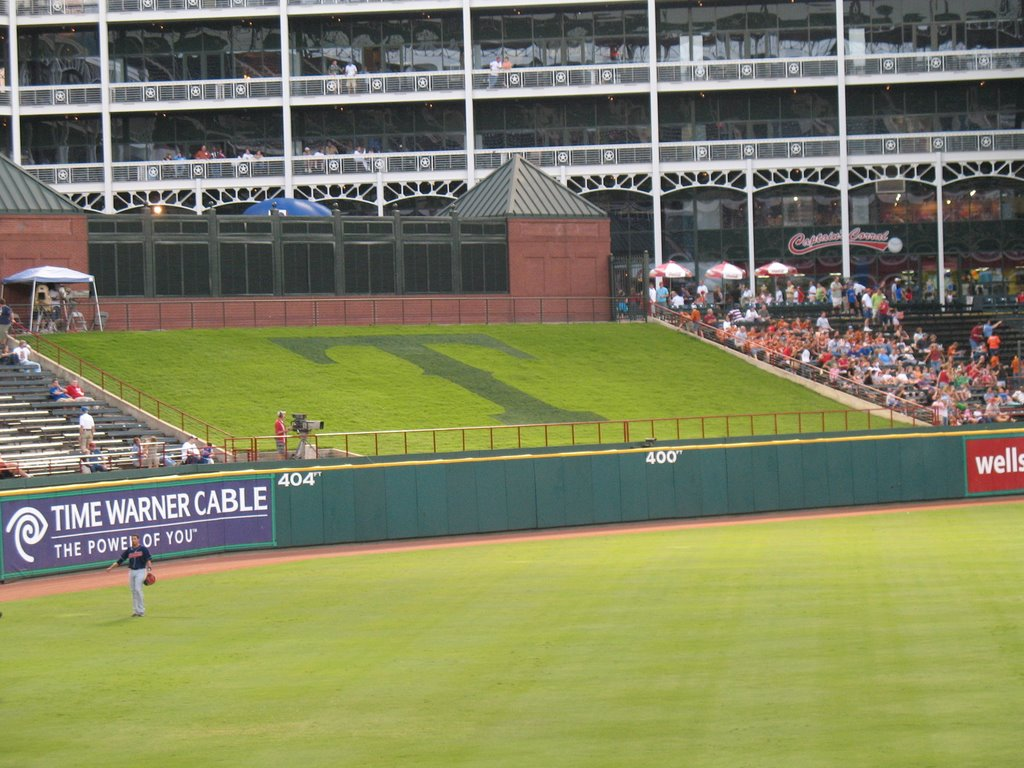
Greene's Hill in the ballpark's center field in 2006

Greene's Hill is a sloped section of turf located beyond the former center field fence. The Hill served as a batter's eye, providing a contrasting background behind the pitchers which enabled hitters to more easily see the baseball after the pitcher's release. It was originally designed as a picnic area for fans but the Rangers never initiated that policy. It was named after former Arlington mayor Richard Greene in November 1997. For a couple of years in the 2000s, the Rangers had the "T" from the Texas Rangers logo mowed into the grass. In 2010, the Rangers started a tradition where they had four girls run around on it with giant Texas state flags when the Rangers scored, similar to what many football teams do when their teams score. Unlike most batter's eyes, fans were allowed to run onto the hill to catch a home run.

=== Seating capacity ===
| Years | Capacity |
|---|---|
| 1994–1995 | 49,292 |
| 1996 | 49,178 |
| 1997–1999 | 49,166 |
| 2000–2005 | 49,115 |
| 2006–2008 | 48,911 |
| 2009–2011 | 49,170 |
| 2012 | 48,194 |
| 2013–present | 48,114 |

The stadium contains 5,704 club seats and 126 luxury suites.

=== Field dimensions ===
Field dimensions while a baseball park

During the stadium's existence as a baseball park, it was one of baseball's most notoriously hitter-friendly parks, due to the high temperatures, relatively short fences, and the design of the stadium which allowed the area's high winds to swirl and lift balls that would not normally make it out. In truth, the park would have given up even more home runs if not for the office building in center and the field being 22 feet (6.7 m) below street level.

With a combination of the park's design and the many good hitters who played for the Rangers during the team's tenure in the park, the Rangers recorded fairly high home run totals. In 1996, the Rangers hit 221 home runs. They eclipsed 200 again in 1998 (201), 1999 (230), 2001 (241), 2002 (230), 2003 (239), 2004 (227), and 2005 (260, four short of the all-time record of 264 by the 1997 Seattle Mariners). Many of the Rangers' already-skilled hitters took advantage of this, some even racking up multiple 30+ home run seasons, such as Ian Kinsler, Adrián Beltré, and Josh Hamilton. The longest home run recorded was 505 feet to right field by Rangers RF Nomar Mazara on June 21, 2019.

Dimensions

| Dimension | Distance |
|---|---|
| Left Field | 332 ft (101 m) |
| Left Center Field | 390 ft (120 m) |
| Center Field | 400 ft (120 m) |
| Right Center Field | 377 ft (115 m) |
| Right Field | 325 ft (99 m) |

=== Lack of retractable roof ===
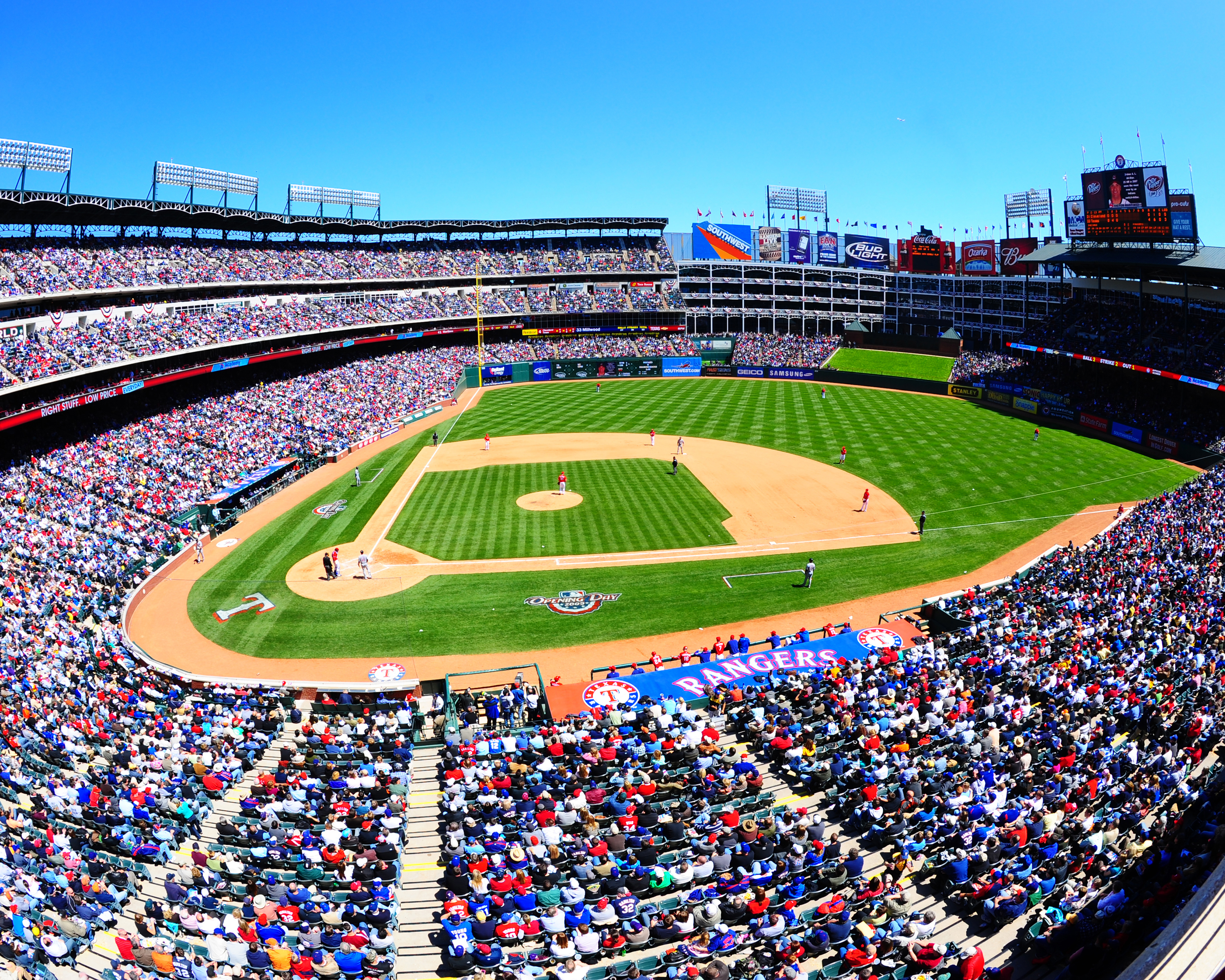
The Ballpark during the day

Despite being hailed as a wonderful venue in its infant years, articles in The Dallas Morning News began to suggest that the ballpark would have been better served by having a dome or retractable roof – much like Daikin Park, the home of the Houston Astros – due to the often oppressive heat that settles over Texas in summer during baseball season, with temperatures on the field being in excess of 110 °F (43 °C). Many argue that the intense heat was a liability in attracting players, particularly starting pitchers.

When the Arlington ballpark was built in the early 1990s, the only Major League Baseball stadium with a retractable roof was Toronto's SkyDome (now Rogers Centre), which opened in 1989. (Also, Montreal's Olympic Stadium was still in use as a ballpark at the time; in 1987, a retractable roof was installed which never worked correctly and was rarely if ever retracted.) The other modern retractable-roof ballparks like Chase Field, T-Mobile Park, Daikin Park, LoanDepot Park, and American Family Field were built in ensuing years.

=== 2010 renovation ===
On December 3, 2010, the Rangers announced that extensive renovations to the stadium would be made and ready for the 2011 season. These renovations included:

- New Daktronics HD video displays in right field (atop the Home Run Porch) and center field (on top of the office building).
- The out-of-town scoreboard on the left field wall (which had been replaced prior to the 2009 season) also was updated with HD technology.
- The audio system throughout the stadium was completely overhauled, with new speakers and production equipment.
- A new "Show Control System" which can display networked data such as videos, scores, and point-of-sale information anywhere in the stadium.
- An IPTV system that can display live television content on ten HDTV channels to any display in the stadium.
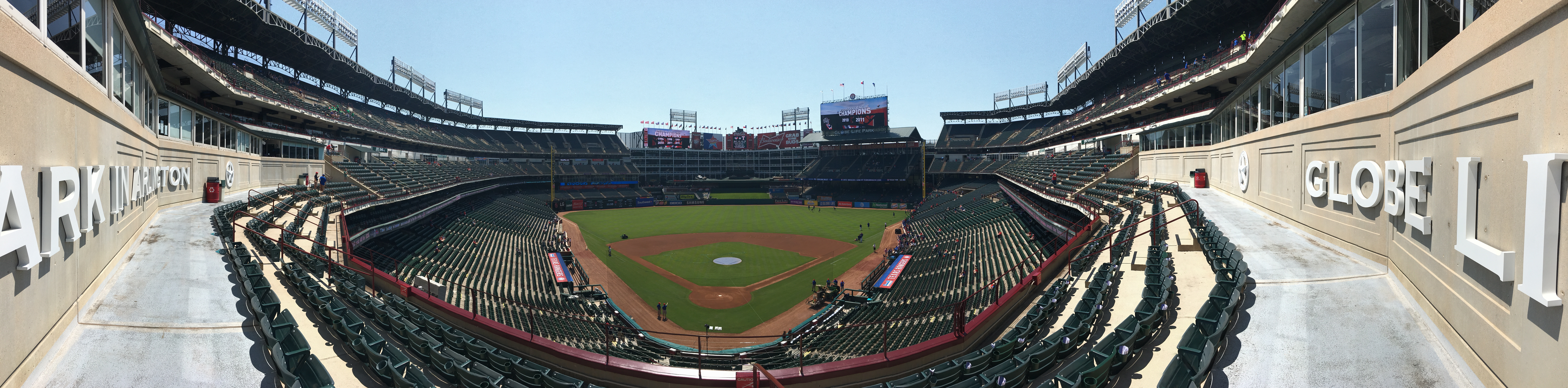
Panorama of Choctaw Stadium, then Globe Life Park, in 2016

=== 2018 reconfiguration for football ===
It was announced on December 5, 2018, that the stadium's lower stands would undergo extensive renovations once the Renegades moved into the stadium in 2020. The conversion to Choctaw Stadium from Globe Life Park was designed by SBL Architecture, Inc. When renovations for the football layout began, the Texas Rangers sold 6,000 souvenir seats in pairs. A broadcast booth and two booths for football coaches were built in the renovated lower suites and two new auxiliary locker rooms were built on the service level. The Rangers' clubhouse became the Renegades' locker room and coaches offices. Lockers were added to the visiting locker room to accommodate Renegades opponents.

== Accidents ==
=== 1994 ===
On April 11, 1994, the first game at the ballpark, Hollye Minter, who was posing for a picture while intoxicated, fell 35 feet (11 m) over a railing in right field, fracturing several bones and causing the team to raise the height of the railings.

=== 2010 ===
On July 6, 2010, firefighter Tyler Morris, leaning over the rail to catch a Nelson Cruz foul ball, fell 30 feet (9.1 m) onto the section below him, causing a head injury and a severely sprained ankle to himself and minor injuries to fans he landed on. The game was stopped for 15 minutes while paramedics treated him.

=== 2011 ===
On July 7, 2011, firefighter Shannon Stone, from Brownwood, Texas, was attending the Rangers game against the Oakland Athletics with his six-year-old son, Cooper, when outfielder Josh Hamilton threw him a ball, as he had asked. Reaching for it, Shannon flipped over the railing and fell 20 feet (6.1 m), head-first, onto the concrete behind the out-of-town scoreboard in left field. He was conscious and talking as paramedics tended to him, but he died en route to the hospital. The cause of death was identified as blunt force trauma. This was the fourth fall in the stadium's 17 years of history. A moment of silence was held for him prior to the next day's game, both the Rangers and Athletics wore black ribbons on their uniforms, and the flags at the stadium were flown at half-staff in memory of him. The Rangers Foundation set up a memorial fund for Stone's family.

A tarp was placed over the opening through which Stone fell. Rangers team president Nolan Ryan said the height of the railings exceeds the requirement of the building codes but said the team would do "whatever it takes" to ensure the safety of the fans; on July 20, 2011, the Rangers announced they would raise all railings in the front of seating sections to 42 inches (110 cm). On August 10, 2011, the team announced it would erect a statue memorializing Stone. Cooper helped unveil the statue on April 5, 2012. It depicts him and his father wearing baseball caps. They are holding hands and looking at each other as if they were talking. The inscription on the statue reads "In memory of Shannon Stone and dedicated to all fans who love the game".

On September 30, 2011, Cooper threw out the ceremonial first pitch to honor his father before Game 1 of the 2011 ALDS against the Tampa Bay Rays.

== Notable events ==
=== MLB ===
The Ballpark In Arlington was the site of one perfect game. Kenny Rogers retired all 27 batters on July 28, 1994, against the California Angels.

The ballpark hosted the 1995 MLB All-Star Game. The first MLB regular-season interleague game was played there on June 12, 1997, when the Rangers played the San Francisco Giants. There were four interleague games on the schedule that night, but the other three were played on the West Coast, so the Giants–Rangers matchup started earlier than the others.

On September 18, 1999, Jim Morris made his major league debut there at age 35, ten years after he had retired from baseball following four arm surgeries. Morris became the oldest player to debut in the big leagues since Minnie Mendoza in 1970.

The first postseason game won by the Rangers there would come in game 2 of the 2010 ALCS, by a score of 7–2 over the Yankees on October 16, 2010. Six days later, the Rangers clinched their first ever American League pennant there after a 6–1 victory over the New York Yankees in game 6 of the ALCS, getting the third out in the ninth from former Ranger Alex Rodriguez.

Two world series have been played in The Ballpark In Arlington. The Rangers hosted games 3, 4 and 5 of the 2010 World Series; the San Francisco Giants won the final two games to win the series in five. Games 3, 4 and 5 of the 2011 World Series were also played there, with the Rangers winning 2 of 3 home games, but losing games 6 and 7 to the Cardinals in St. Louis. This was one of three sporting championships to take place in the Dallas/Fort Worth Metroplex in the same year, along with Super Bowl XLV and the 2011 NBA Finals.

=== College baseball ===
It hosted the 2002 and the 2004 Big 12 Conference baseball tournament. Since 2013, the UT Arlington baseball team annually hosts one game in the stadium every March.

=== In popular culture ===
Scenes from Walt Disney Pictures' The Rookie were shot there. Filming included actor Dennis Quaid (as Jim Morris) running onto the playing field from the visitors' bullpen during the seventh-inning stretch of an actual game in progress.

The ballpark and Legends of the Game Museum were featured in an episode of North Texas Explorer.

== Non-baseball events ==
=== Concerts ===
| Date | Artist | Opening act(s) | Tour / Concert name | Attendance | Revenue | Notes |
|---|---|---|---|---|---|---|
| November 9, 2013 | Eli Young Band | Josh Abbott Band; Easton Corbin; Thompson Square | House Party | — | — | |
| November 8, 2014 | Eli Young Band | Gary Allan; Pat Green; Cody Johnson; Maddie & Tae | House Party II | — | — | |
| June 14, 2019 | Paul McCartney | — | Freshen Up | 45,024 / 45,024 | $6,313,791 | |
| October 11, 2019 | Jason Aldean | — | Ride All Night Tour | — | — | |
| October 12, 2019 | Billy Joel | — | Billy Joel in Concert | 43,626 / 43,626 | $5,405,903 | |
| November 28, 2020 | For King & Country | — | A Drummer Boy Christmas Tour | — | — | |

=== Football ===
Prior to the XFL's shutdown after five weeks in 2020, the Dallas Renegades had played three games in the stadium. They lost all three beginning with a 15–9 defeat in the season opener against the St. Louis BattleHawks. After the Houston Roughnecks defeated the Renegades 27–20 in Week 4, their last game at Globe Life Park was a 30–12 loss to the New York Guardians. The Dallas Renegades (now known as the Arlington Renegades) resumed play in the stadium starting with the 2023 season, with the stadium serving as a hub for all eight teams during the regular season and the seven other teams flying to their home stadiums each week. In 2024, the XFL—ahead of an upcoming merger with the United States Football League—indicated that the stadium would again serve as the hub for the merged league. The Renegades left in 2025 to play at Toyota Stadium.

In 2021 and 2022, the stadium was home of the annual Arlington Showdown featuring the Texas Southern Tigers versus the Southern University Jaguars.

The stadium hosts the high school football games for the Arlington Independent School District as part of the University Interscholastic League.

=== Rugby union ===
The stadium has been the home of the Dallas Jackals of Major League Rugby since their inaugural season in 2022 until the club ceased operations in September 2024.

=== Soccer ===
The International Champions Cup soccer match featuring Atlético Madrid of Spain vs. Chivas Guadalajara of Mexico was played on July 23, 2019. It was the first time that a soccer match involving professional clubs was played at Choctaw Stadium.

North Texas SC of USL League One moved from its previous home in Frisco to Choctaw Stadium beginning in 2020. The club is scheduled to leave the stadium in 2026 and move to Mansfield, Texas.

=== Other events ===
It was the venue for the Dallas/Fort Worth MDA Muscle Walk event that took place on September 20, 2014. This was previously held at AT&T Stadium (formerly Cowboys Stadium) from 2010 to 2013.

On June 17, 2019, a tornado with estimated strength of EF-1 touched down in Arlington near Choctaw Stadium. Officials said the storm damaged windscreens in left field and caused damage to a small portion of the left field roof. Further, the Chick-fil-A signage on the foul pole in left field was damaged.

== See also ==
- Texas Rangers Hall of Fame
- List of rugby union stadiums by capacity
- Lists of stadiums

Events and tenants
| Preceded by Arlington Stadium | Home of the Texas Rangers; 1994 – 2019 | Succeeded by Globe Life Field |
| Preceded by first stadium | Home of the Dallas/Arlington Renegades; 2020 – 2025 | Succeeded by Toyota Stadium |
| Preceded by Three Rivers Stadium | Host of the All-Star Game; 1995 | Succeeded by Veterans Stadium |
