= Bernard Rapoport =

American businessman

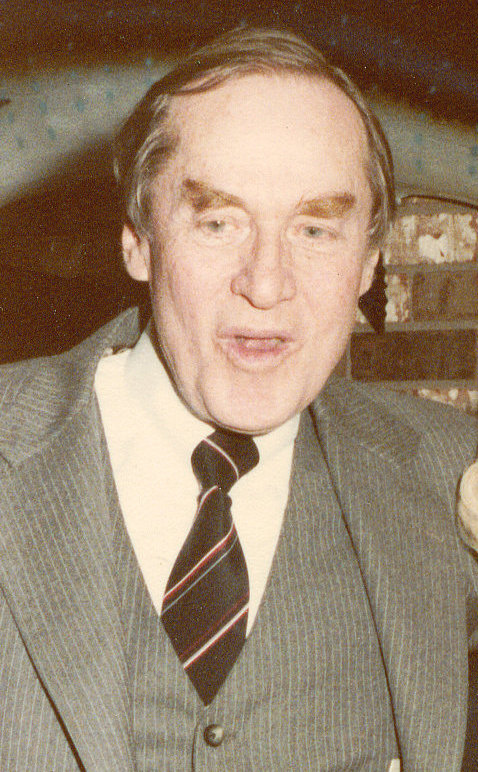
- Born: Bernard Rapoport; July 17, 1917; San Antonio, Texas, USA
- Died: April 5, 2012 (aged 94); Waco, Texas, USA
- Education: Bachelor's degree
- Alma mater: The University of Texas at Austin
- Occupations: Founder of American Income Life Insurance Company; Founder of the Bernard and Audre Rapoport Foundation

Bernard Rapoport (July 17, 1917 – April 5, 2012) was an American entrepreneur, philanthropist, author, and the founder of American Income Life Insurance Company.

== Background and education ==
Bernard Rapoport was born on July 17, 1917, in San Antonio, Texas. His father, David Rapoport, and mother, Riva Feldman, immigrated to the United States from Russia in the early 1900s. Rapoport's upbringing was very modest, and his father peddled blankets on the streets of San Antonio. When Rapoport was 6 years old, his family was evicted from their home, and they continued to face financial difficulties through the Great Depression.

Rapoport worked his way through college at a jewelry store. He graduated from the University of Texas at Austin with a Bachelor of Arts in 1939. Rapoport met Audre Newman in January 1942, and they soon married. The couple lived in Wichita Falls, Texas, where Rapoport continued his work in jewelry sales. Rapoport was also a founder of the Gamma Deuteron Chapter of the Alpha Epsilon Pi fraternity in 1939 at the University of Texas at Austin, where he is an esteemed alumnus.

== Career ==
In 1949, the couple moved to San Antonio, and Rapoport began his career selling insurance with Pioneer American Insurance. By the end of 1949, he had opened his own company, Pioneer American Agency, in Waco, Texas. In 1951, Harold Goodman, Audre's uncle, introduced Rapoport to the idea of running American Income. American Income Life Insurance Company (AIL) was chartered as a mutual assessment association in Indiana with $25,000 of borrowed capital. It was reinsured through American Standard as a new mutual reserve company in March 1951. The company's home offices were located in Indianapolis, Indiana.

American Income Life originally sold low-cost hospital insurance plans. During its first year, The company took in about $95,000 worth of premium income. The company reached $1 million worth of insurance premiums in 1953. By 1954, AIL was receiving 6,000 insurance policy applications per month.

In September 1954, with $200,000 in capital and $100,000 of surplus, Goodman and Rapoport formed a new company called American Income Life Insurance Company (AIL). American Income Life reinsured the policies of the original company and was transformed from a mutual reserve company to a stock company. American Standard, the company's original insurer, was merged with American Income, and the company acquired about $400,000 worth of premiums. Between 1954 and 1955, AIL's assets had doubled, its net reserve had tripled, its capital and surplus more than doubled, and it had about $15 million of insurance in force.

In 1956, Rapoport desired to take the Indiana-based company national. He obtained a license in Ohio and opened a central office in Columbus. By the close of 1956, American Income Life was operating in 13 states with 300 sales personnel in the field operating out of 96 General Agencies. In March 1958, The company's home offices were moved from Indianapolis, Indiana, to Waco, Texas, where Rapoport lived until his death.

== Philanthropy and politics ==
Rapoport established the Bernard and Audre Rapoport Foundation in 1987 for the purpose of benefiting childcare, education, the Waco community, and other enterprises. Rapoport was appointed to a six-year term on the board of regents of The University of Texas System by Governor Ann Richards in 1991, serving as chairman from 1993 until 1997. Rapoport was named by Fortune magazine as one of America's "40 most generous philanthropists," unstinting in his support for education, social justice, and liberal political causes. He also provided substantial support to the progressive/populist political magazine The Texas Observer. Rapoport was an avid donor to the University of Texas.

Rapoport was appointed by former president Bill Clinton as a member of the Advisory Committee for Trade Policy and Negotiations (ACTPN). He was a member of the Library of Congress Trust Fund Board, National Hispanic University Trustee Emeritus, Horatio Alger Association of Distinguished Americans, Economic Policy Institute, National Jobs For All Coalition, and the Joint Center for Political and Economic Studies.
