= United Investors Life Insurance Company =

- Type: Subsidiary of Protective Life Corporation
- Industry: Life insurance
- Founded: 1961
- Defunct: 2012
- Fate: Merged
- Successor: Protective Life Corporation
- Headquarters: Birmingham, Alabama, United States
- Area served: United States
- Key people: John D. Johns (President and CEO)
- Products: Supplemental health insurance and life insurance
- Revenue: US$ 397.9 million (2008)
- Parent: Protective Life Corporation
- Rating: A (Excellent) (AM Best 2010)
- Website: www.uilic.com Archived August 4, 2011, at the Wayback Machine

United Investors Life Insurance Company (UILIC) was an American life insurance company based in Birmingham, Alabama. It provided individual life insurance and annuity products. The Company became a wholly owned subsidiary of Protective Life Corporation in 2010 and was eventually merged with its parent company.

As of 2010, UILIC had more than $14 billion of insurance in force with more than 150,000 policies and 1,400 licensed Agents nationwide. At that time, United Investors Life Insurance Company held the A (Excellent) Financial Strength Rating from AM Best.

== History ==
United Investors was founded in 1961.

Prior to October 1981, all outstanding stock of United Investors Life was held by Waddell & Reed, Inc. (90 percent), the distributor and manager of the “United Group” of Mutual Funds, and its parent, Continental Investment Corporation (10 percent), a financial services holding company. At that time, Torchmark Corporation, through a subsidiary, acquired all three companies.

In the first quarter of 1998, 81 percent of United Investors Life was acquired by affiliate company, Liberty National Life Insurance Company. The remaining 19 percent was contributed by Torchmark to Liberty National in 2006. In December 2010, Torchmark sold United Investors Life to Birmingham, Alabama-based Protective Life Corporation.

The United Investor Life brand was discontinued around 2012.
