= American Income Life Insurance Company =

American life insurance company

- Type: Subsidiary of Globe Life
- Traded as: (formerly NASDAQ: AINC)
- Industry: Life insurance
- Founded: 1951; 75 years ago
- Founder: Bernard Rapoport
- Headquarters: Waco, Texas, United States
- Area served: United States, Canada and New Zealand
- Key people: Steven K. Greer (CEO)
- Products: Supplemental health and life insurance
- Parent: Globe Life
- Subsidiaries: National Income Life Insurance Company, Union Heritage Life Assurance Company Limited
- Website: ailife.com

American Income Life Insurance Company (AIL) is an American unionized private life insurance company that provides supplemental life insurance to labor unions, credit unions, and associations. The parent company is Globe Life Insurance.

The company was founded in 1951 and the executive offices have been located in Waco, Texas, since 1959. American Income Life is licensed in 49 states, the District of Columbia, Canada, and is registered to carry on business in New Zealand. AIL also has two wholly owned subsidiaries: National Income Life Insurance Company, licensed in the state of New York, and Union Heritage Life Assurance Company Limited, licensed in the Republic of Ireland.

As of 2013, AIL had more than two million policyholders and was a wholly owned subsidiary of Globe Life, based in McKinney, Texas.

== History ==
The company began in 1951 under the name American Income, chartered as a mutual assessment association in Indiana with $25,000 of borrowed capital. It was reinsured through American Standard Insurance Company as a new mutual reserve company in March 1951. American Income Insurance Company was officially founded in May 1951 by the company's president, Harold Goodman, and executive vice president, Bernard Rapoport, who was Goodman's nephew. The company's home offices were located in Indianapolis, Indiana.

In 1961, AIL began providing supplemental insurance to members of labor unions and serving union policyholders in ways unfamiliar to the industry. For example, AIL waived payment of premiums by union members during an authorized strike action, a benefit still offered in 2021. AIL also developed a college scholarship program for children of union members, and the company contributed to the strike funds of unions engaged in lawful strikes. The company was positioned as the only 100% union insurance company, and termed the phrase, “Be Union-Buy Union." In 1963, AIL's income was about $6 or $7 million.

In 1994, American Income Life was sold to Torchmark Corporation for $563 million.

As part of a company-wide rebranding of the Torchmark Corporation, American Income Life became a subsidiary of Globe Life.

== Sales model ==
American Income Life distributes its insurance through independent-contractor agents who exclusively sell insurance products issued by Globe Life companies. The company organizes its sales force into a hierarchy of agents and managers; advancement involves recruiting and training agents, building sales teams, and developing candidates for management positions. Supervisory and management-level agents may earn override commissions based on the performance of agents within their teams or broader sales hierarchies; the company also advertises residual income, bonuses, and convention eligibility.

== Legal and regulatory matters ==
A 2023 market-conduct examination by the Pennsylvania Insurance Department identified violations involving altered applications, unapproved forms, policy replacements, and deceptive practices by producers. American Income Life disputed some of the findings and described changes to its procedures. In 2024, the Equal Employment Opportunity Commission found reasonable cause to believe that six sales agents had experienced sex discrimination and that one had also experienced race discrimination. The commission also asserted that the six complainants were employees of Globe Life rather than independent contractors; Globe Life said the findings were nonbinding.

Globe Life and American Income Life received subpoenas from the U.S. Department of Justice in November 2023 concerning sales practices by certain independent agents; the department closed the investigation in July 2025 without taking enforcement action. In April 2024, short sellers Fuzzy Panda Research and Viceroy Research accused American Income Life and affiliated agencies of fraudulent or misleading sales practices. Globe Life denied the allegations, which Reuters said it could not independently verify. Staff of the U.S. Securities and Exchange Commission separately concluded an investigation into Globe Life in July 2025 without recommending enforcement action.
