= Protective Life =

Financial service holding company

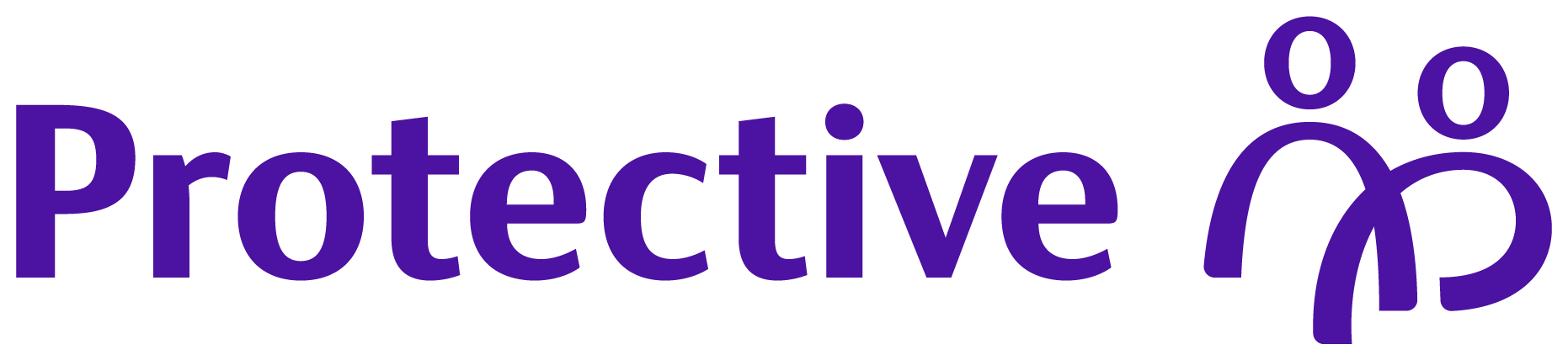
- Type: Subsidiary
- Industry: Insurance & Finance
- Founded: 1907; 119 years ago
- Headquarters: Birmingham, Alabama, United States
- Key people: Richard J. Bielen (President and Chief Executive Officer); Steve Walker (Vice Chairman, Finance & Risk)
- Products: Life insurance, annuities and asset protection products
- Revenue: ▲$7.75 billion USD (2024))
- Net income: ▲$389.0 million USD (2024)
- Total assets: ▲$124.5 billion USD (2024)
- Number of employees: 3,800 (2023)
- Parent: Dai-ichi Life
- Subsidiaries: Protective Life Insurance Company; Protective Life and Annuity Insurance Company; West Coast Life Insurance Company; Protective Property and Casualty Insurance Company
- Website: www.protective.com

Protective Life Corporation is a financial service holding company in Birmingham, Alabama. The company's primary subsidiary, Protective Life Insurance Company, was established in 1907 and now markets its products and services in all 50 states. As of December 31, 2023, the corporation has more than 3,800 employees, annual revenues of $7.75 billion and assets of $124.5 billion. In addition to Protective Life Insurance Company, Protective Life Corporation's subsidiaries include West Coast Life Insurance Company, MONY Life Insurance Company, Protective Life And Annuity Insurance Company, Concourse Financial Group, and Protective Property and Casualty Insurance Company.

== History ==
Protective Life Insurance Company was founded in 1907 and paid its first death claim in 1909.

In 1927, Protective merged with Alabama National Insurance Company, and Alabama National's president, Samuel Clabaugh, became the president of the combined companies which continued to do business as Protective.

In 1937, Clabaugh turned over the leadership of the company to Col. William J. Rushton, and in 1969, Col. Rushton's son, William “Billy” J. Rushton III, became president of Protective. The younger Rushton then presided over a series of acquisitions that led Protective into all 50 states. As part of this push, Drayton Nabers Jr. became CEO in 1992 and in 1993, Protective Life Corporation was listed on the New York Stock Exchange under the ticker symbol PL.

In 1997, Protective Life acquired West Coast Life. Nabers retired in 2002 and Harvard Business School graduate John D. Johns was then named president and CEO of Protective Life. John D. Johns served as president and chief executive officer until 2017 and as chairman of the board from January 2003 to November 2019.

In 2007, Protective Life celebrated its 100th anniversary, just one year after its acquisition of Chase Insurance Group in 2006.

In 2010, Protective life acquired Alabama-based life insurance company, United Investors Life Insurance Company from Torchmark.

In 2013, Protective's principal subsidiary, Protective Life Insurance Company, completed the acquisition of MONY Life Insurance Company and reinsured certain policies of MONY Life Insurance Company of America. The total transaction price was $1.06 billion.

Protective Life Corporation was acquired by The Dai-ichi Life Insurance Company, Limited (Tokyo, Japan) on February 15, 2015.

On July 1, 2017, Rich Bielen became Protective's 7th president and chief executive officer. He plans to retire at the end of 2026.

On June 1, 2019, Protective closed its largest transaction to date to acquire via reinsurance substantially all of the individual life and annuity business of Great-West Life & Annuity Insurance Company. The acquisition represented an estimated capital investment of approximately $1.20 billion.

Protective Life has offices in Alabama, Missouri and Kentucky.

Paul Wells will take over as CEO on January 1, 2027.

=== Leadership and board of directors ===
Protective Life Corporation leadership includes Richard J. Bielen (President and CEO), Steve Walker (Vice Chairman, Finance and Risk), Scott Adams (EVP, Chief Transformation and Strategy Officer), Mark Drew (EVP, General Counsel and Secretary), Lance Black (EVP, Acquisitions and Corporate Development), Paul Wells (EVP and CFO), Phil Passafiume (EVP, Chief Investment Officer), Wade Harrison (EVP, Chief Retail Officer) and Wendy Evesque (EVP and CHRO).

The company's board of directors includes Michael J. Morrissey (chair), Richard J. Bielen, Stephen Barnham, Dawn Bulgarella, Joseph Guastella, Bruce Koepfgen, Jesse J. Spikes, Satoshi Takemoto, Mark Tarr, William A. Terry and W. Michael Warren Jr. Four of the members, Richard J. Bielen, Stephen Barnham, and Satoshi Takemoto, are affiliated with the company and its subsidiaries. The remaining eight members are independent.

=== Operations ===
The company offers plans in:

- Life insurance, including universal life, variable universal life, and bank-owned life insurance products offered through a network of brokers, stockbrokers and independent marketing organizations.
- Annuities, including fixed and variable annuity products sold through broker-dealers, financial institutions and brokers.
- Stable value products, including fixed and floating-rate funding agreements sold to the trustees of municipal bond proceeds, institutional investors, bank trust departments and money market funds.
- Asset protection, marketing extended service contracts and credit life and disability insurance to protect consumers’ investments in automobiles, watercraft and recreational vehicles.
- Acquisitions, consisting of policies originated by other companies and later acquired by Protective. The segment's primary focus is on life insurance policies and annuity products that were sold to individuals.

=== Sponsorships ===
In April 2019, Protective Life was announced as the naming sponsor for a 47,000-seat football stadium on the grounds of the Birmingham–Jefferson Convention Complex that opened on October 2, 2021. Protective Stadium is the new home for UAB Blazers football, replacing Legion Field.

== Philanthropy ==
The company established the Protective Life Foundation, which supports education and healthy development of at-risk youth. In addition, the foundation engages in charitable activities for cultural organizations, civic and community initiatives, human services groups, and the United Way.
