= Casey Donahew =

American Texas country music singer

- Origin: Burleson, Texas, U.S.
- Genres: Country; Texas country
- Years active: 2002–present
- Label: Almost Country Entertainment
- Website: Official website

Casey Donahew (born April 21, 1977 in Burleson, Texas) is an American Texas country music singer. His last four albums charted on the Billboard US country top 10. The 2016 album All Night Party reached number three on the Billboard country chart, his highest chart position to date. On July 26, 2019, his album One Light Town was released and made its debut at number two on the Billboard Country Album Sales chart.

== Career ==
Donahew began writing songs in high school, and credits past relationships as inspiration behind much of his early work, stating:

Once you get your heart broken for the first time, you've got a lot to say, I guess.

Eventually, he broke into the world of Texas Country, which was gaining popularity with Pat Green, Robert Earl Keen and Randy Rogers. Casey's approach to songwriting is different from typical country music artists, as he often writes about heartbreak with a unique twist on the subject, as well as his experiences in different locations across the state, most notably the Stockyards of Fort Worth.

Donahew began playing professionally in 2002 by booking mostly bar gigs and building a dedicated fanbase among younger crowds. He gained notoriety online and on airwaves throughout Texas, and reached the Top 30 on the Billboard Top Country Albums chart with the album Moving On, released in 2009.

On October 24, 2011, the Casey Donahew Band released their fourth studio album titled Double-Wide Dream exclusively on iTunes. The album was officially released on CD, available at retailers like Best Buy, Walmart and Hastings on October 25, 2011. From this album, their single, "One Star Flag", held the number one spot on Texas Music Chart.

In 2013, the album Standoff was released. It reached No. 7 on Top Country Albums, selling 13,000 on its debut week.

All Night Party was released on August 19, 2016. It debuted at No. 3, selling 11,000 copies in its first week. It is their highest charting album on Top Country Albums.

On October 7, 2017, Donahew released 15 Years: The Wild Ride, 15 updated recordings of Donahew’s most popular songs from the first part of his career, as well as a recording of Matchbox 20’s "3AM," a song Casey played for years live before finally recording it in the studio.

On March 29, 2019, Casey announced a new project, "One Light Town." Released on July 26, 2019, and produced by Josh Leo, "One Light Town" features 15 new songs, 7 of which were released digitally to fans when the album was announced. Donahew wrote or co-wrote 8 of the 15 songs and recorded songs by songwriters including Tim Nichols, Jimmy Yeary, Brad Tursi, Ben Hayslip, David Lee Murphy, Josh Leo, Matt Ramsey, Trevor Rosen, Jeff Hyde, Jon Randall, Rodney Clawson, Michael Lotten, Wynn Varble, Jeff Outlaw, and Steve Stone.

On September 27, 2024, Donahew released Never Not Love You featuring 17 new songs.

== Discography ==
=== Studio albums ===
Title	Album details	Peak chart positions				Sales
Title	Album details	US Country	US	US Heat	US Indie	Sales
Lost Days	Release date: August 15, 2006; Label: self-released	-	-	-	-	
Casey Donahew Band	Release date: December 20, 2006; Label: self-released	-	-	-	-	
Moving On	Release date: September 1, 2009; Label: Almost Country Entertainment	28	126	3	19	
Double-Wide Dream	Release date: October 25, 2011; Label: Almost Country Entertainment	10	32	-	8	
Standoff	Release date: April 16, 2013; Label: Almost Country Entertainment	7	32	-	7	
All Night Party	Release date: August 19, 2016; Label: Almost Country Entertainment	3	40	-	3	
One Light Town	Release date: July 26, 2019; Label: Almost Country Entertainment	25	-	-	7	
Built Different	Release date: March 25, 2022; Label: Almost Country Entertainment	-	-	-	-	
Never Not Love You	Release Date September 27, 2024; Label: Almost Country Entertainment	-	-	-	-	
"-" denotes releases that did not chart

=== Live albums ===
Title	Album details
Live-Raw-Real in the Ville	Release date: March 20, 2008; Label: self-released
Lost My Brothers Goat	Release date: June 19, 2020; Label: Almost Country Entertainment

=== Greatest Hits albums ===
Title	Album details
15 Years: The Wild Ride	Release date: October 6, 2017; Label: Almost Country Entertainment

=== Singles ===
Year	Title	Peak chart positions	Album
Year	Title	US Country Airplay	Album
2009	"Ramblin Kind"	-	Moving On
2010	"Next Time"	-	Moving On
2011	"Let Me Love You"	-	Moving On
2011	"Double-Wide Dream"	-	Double-Wide Dream
2011	"Let's Not Say Goodbye Again"	-	Double-Wide Dream
2012	"One Star Flag"	-	Double-Wide Dream
2012	"When Santa Rides Through Texas"	-	Non-Album Single
2013	"Whiskey Baby"	-	Standoff
2013	"Small Town Love"	-	Standoff
2014	"Loving Out of Control"	-	Standoff
2014	"Not Ready to Say Goodnight"	-	Standoff
2014	"Loser"	-	Standoff
2015	"Feels This Right"	-	All Night Party
2016	"Kiss Me"	49	All Night Party
2016	"Going Down Tonight"	-	All Night Party
2017	"Country Song"	54	All Night Party
2018	"That Got the Girl"	-	All Night Party
2019	"Drove Me to the Whiskey"	-	One Light Town
2020	"Bad Guy"	-	One Light Town
2022	"83 Chevrolet Time Machine"	-	Built Different
2022	"Built Different"	-	Built Different
2022	"Telling on My Heart"	-	Built Different
2023	"God Blessed Texas"	-	Non-Album Single
2023	"Oklahoma"	-	Never Not Love You
2024	"Luckiest Guy I Know"	-	Never Not Love You
2024	"Hungover Again"	-	Never Not Love You
2024	"Whiskey Talkin’"	-	Never Not Love You
2024	"When She Kissed Me"	-	Never Not Love You
2024	"Green in Colorado"	-	Never Not Love You
2024	"Never Not Love You"	-	Never Not Love You
2026	"Earnhardt"	-	Non-Album Single
"-" denotes releases that did not chart

=== Music videos ===
Year	Video	Director
2010	"Nowhere Fast"	Randall Alexander
2012	"Double-Wide Dream"	Evan Kaufmann
2012	"One Star Flag"	Evan Kaufmann
2013	"Whiskey Baby"	Evan Kaufmann
2014	"Lovin' Out of Control"	Evan Kaufmann
2016	"Kiss Me"	Evan Kaufmann
2018	"Country Song"	
2020	"Bad Guy"	
2023	"Oklahoma"	
