= Globe Life and Accident Insurance Company =

American insurance company

Globe Life
- Type: Subsidiary
- Industry: Life insurance
- Founded: 1951; 75 years ago
- Founder: Ralph Reece; John Singletary
- Headquarters: McKinney, Texas
- Area served: United States
- Key people: Jason Harvey (president)
- Products: Life insurance and supplemental health
- Parent: Globe Life
- Website: home.globelifeinsurance.com

Globe Life, based in McKinney, Texas, provides life and health insurance coverage nationwide. The company has executive offices in Oklahoma City and McKinney, Texas and is a subsidiary of Globe Life.

== History ==
The company was started in 1951 by Ralph Reece and John Singletary with $60,000 of borrowed capital. Globe originally sold life insurance to rural Oklahoma communities. The company's life insurance premium has grown from approximately $221 million in 1998 to approximately $813 million in 2018.

== Sponsorships ==
On February 5, 2014, Globe Life and Accident Insurance Company purchased the naming rights to Globe Life Park in Arlington, the Texas Rangers Major League Baseball team's stadium in Arlington, Texas. The agreement ran for ten years starting in 2014 and ending with the 2023 baseball season. In 2017, the naming rights partnership was extended through 2048.

Globe Life and Texas Rangers Baseball Foundation partnered on a baseball and softball grant program again in 2015.

Globe Life is the official insurance company of the Dallas Cowboys and partners with the organization through advertising and corporate events at the Cowboys’ stadium, AT&T Stadium in Arlington, Texas, and at the Dallas Cowboys’ headquarters and training facility in Frisco, Texas.

== President & CEO ==
Charles F. Hudson was the Senior Vice President of Globe Life from August 2001 through August 2005. He became President and CEO in August 2005 and retired in November 2014. Bill Leavell was named President of Globe Life in October 2013.

== Company reputation ==
In a 2002 lawsuit, Globe Life was fined a civil penalty of $5,000 for failing to pay interest on death claims in Oregon.
