= Jonathan Drubner =

American television host (born 1972)

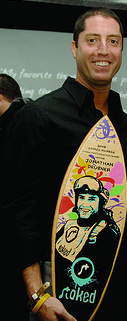
- Drubner with 2009 Stoked Mentor of the Year Award
- Born: Jonathan Scott Drubner; June 15, 1972 (age 54); Middlebury, Connecticut, U.S.
- Other name: Drubner
- Education: Syracuse University's S. I. Newhouse School of Public Communications
- Occupations: Television Personality, comedian, producer, writer, director
- Years active: 2001–present
- Spouse: Jennifer (2010–present)
- Children: Ozzy (2013-present)

Jonathan Scott Drubner (born June 15, 1972) is a stand-up comedian, writer, and television personality. He is the former host and producer for the ESPNU College Road Trip. Drubner has also served as co-producer to head writer for the ESPY Awards since 2005. His work on the show earned him an Outstanding Original Music and Lyrics Emmy nomination in 2009 for the song "I Love Sports," which was performed during the show. In 2007 Drubner made a guest appearance on ABC College Football awards show as a photographer pranking college football stars.

Prior to joining ESPN, Drubner he served as executive producer, writer, and talent for multiple video game related programs for Spike TV, MTV, and AOL. Additionally, Drubner has provided marketing and copywriting services for such companies as Reebok, Heineken, Sony, and Movietickets.com.

Jonathan graduated from the S.I. Newhouse School of Public Communications at Syracuse University. In his spare time, he volunteers as a mentor for Stoked, where in 2009 he was awarded with the Stoked Mentoring Pair of the Year award with Erik Tobar.

In July 2012, Drubner was named associate director at L&S Advisors, Inc.
