= Globe Life =

American financial services company

Globe Life Inc.
- Formerly: Torchmark Corporation (1980–2019)
- Type: Public
- Traded as: NYSE: GL; S&P 500 component
- Industry: Life insurance
- Founded: 1900; 126 years ago in Birmingham, Alabama, U.S.
- Headquarters: McKinney, Texas, U.S.
- Key people: Matthew Darden (co-CEO); Frank M. Svoboda (co-CEO)
- Revenue: ▲US$5.78 billion (2024)
- Operating income: ▲US$1.33 billion (2024)
- Net income: ▲US$1.07 billion (2024)
- Total assets: ▲US$29.1 billion (2024)
- Total equity: ▲US$5.31 billion (2024)
- Number of employees: 3,732 (2024)
- Website: globelifeinsurance.com

Globe Life Inc. is an American financial services holding company listed on the New York Stock Exchange which operates through its wholly owned subsidiaries providing life insurance, annuity, and supplemental health insurance products. The company is based in McKinney, Texas.

== History ==
The original core of Globe Life, Liberty National Life Insurance Company was founded in 1900 as the Heralds of Liberty, a fraternal benefit society. The company was headquartered in Birmingham, Alabama, until 2006 when it moved to McKinney, Texas.

In 1980, Liberty National acquired Globe Life And Accident Insurance Company and formed the holding company Torchmark Corporation.

In 1981, Torchmark acquired United Investors Life Insurance Company (UIL), United American Insurance Company, and Waddell and Reed Financial.

In 1994, Torchmark acquired American Income Life Insurance Company.

In 1998, Torchmark spun off Waddell and Reed Financial, a mutual fund subsidiary.

In August 2001, a mutual fund company filed a civil racketeering suit against Torchmark Corporation, which accused Torchmark and its former chief executive of scheming to continue control over Waddell & Reed Financial Inc. after Torchmark spun it off in 1998. However, in a series of orders dated February 20, 2003, August 20, 2004, and September 28, 2004, the United States District Court for the Northern District of Kansas later granted summary judgment against plaintiff Waddell & Reed and in favor of Torchmark and the other defendants named in the action.

In 2006, Torchmark began moving its headquarters from Birmingham, Alabama to McKinney, Texas.

In 2010, Torchmark sold United Investors Life Insurance Company to Protective Life Corporation.

In 2012, TMK acquired Family Heritage Life Insurance Company of America. It was renamed Globe Life Family Heritage Division in 2019.

On February 5, 2014, Torchmark's subsidiary Globe Life purchased the naming rights of Globe Life Park in Arlington, formerly Rangers Ballpark in Arlington, the home of Major League Baseball's Texas Rangers Baseball Club located in Arlington, Texas. The naming rights were eventually transferred to Globe Life Field, the Rangers' new home park, alongside extending the naming rights through 2048.

On August 8, 2019, Torchmark Corporation was renamed Globe Life.

On April 11, 2024, Globe Life's share price experienced its biggest single-day decline, falling by 53.14% from $104.93 to $49.17. This came after Fuzzy Panda Research, which had taken a short position on the company, alleged that Globe Life committed numerous instances of insurance fraud, allegations which Globe Life rejected. The company completed a review of the allegations in July, and by August 29th, 2024, the share price had regained its value and closed at $104.98. On December 4, 2024, short seller Fuzzy Panda issued new claims that Globe Life had shuttered offices, suggesting a shrinking workforce, causing its stock to fall again. The company disputed the claims, issuing a statement that since the COVID-19 pandemic, they were transitioning to a virtual business model.

== Subsidiaries ==
- Globe Life Liberty National Division, McKinney, Texas
- Globe Life And Accident Insurance Company, Oklahoma City, Oklahoma
- United American Insurance Company, McKinney, Texas
- American Income Life Insurance Company, Waco, Texas
- Globe Life Insurance Company of New York, Syracuse, New York
- Globe Life Family Heritage Division (previously known as Family Heritage Life Insurance Company of America)

== See also ==
- List of Texas companies
