= List of Auburn University people =

This list of notable Auburn University people includes alumni, faculty, and former students of Auburn University.

Each of the following alumni, faculty, and former students of Auburn University is presumed to be notable, receiving significant coverage in multiple published, secondary sources which are reliable, intellectually independent of each other, and independent of the subject. See: Notability on Wikipedia.

== Academia ==
- Wilford S. Bailey (1942), 13th president of Auburn University
- P. O. Davis (1916), radio pioneer; Alabama Extension Service director; national agricultural leader and spokesman
- Luther Duncan (1900 and 1907), 4-H pioneer, Cooperative Extension administrator; Auburn University president
- Jeffrey S. Harper (1998), executive director at Scott College of Business, Indiana State University
- John Junkins (B.S. 1965), professor of aerospace engineering and former interim president of Texas A&M University
- Vincent Poor (1972 and 1974), dean, School of Engineering and Applied Science at Princeton University; member of the National Academy of Engineering (2001) and of the National Academy of Sciences (2011), recipient of John Fritz Medal (2016)
- Walter Merritt Riggs (1892), president of Clemson University (1910–1924), "father of Clemson football"
- Letitia Dowdell Ross (1866–1952), educator who taught at State Normal College (now Jacksonville State University), Martin Female College (Pulaski, Tennessee), and North Texas Female College (Sherman, Texas); leader of women's organizations
- Jean Garner Stead (1973), professor emerita of Management at East Tennessee State University
- E. T. York (1942 and 1946), Alabama Cooperative Extension System director (1959–1961); interim president of the University of Florida (1973–1974); chancellor of the State University System of Florida (1974–1980)

== Architecture, design and construction ==
- Basima Abdulrahman (2014), structural engineer
- Marlon Blackwell (1980), architect, 2020 AIA Gold Medal
- Jennifer Bonner (born 1979), architect
- Helen Sellers Davis (née Helen Sellers; 1912–2008), class of 1935; first licensed female architect in Alabama
- Tom Hardy (1970), design strategist, corporate head of the IBM Design Program
- Samuel Mockbee (1974), architect, founder of Auburn's Rural Studio, 2004 AIA Gold Medal; MacArthur Fellow (2000)
- Paul Rudolph (1940), architect, chairman of Yale Department of Architecture, 1958–1965

== Arts and humanities ==
- Ace Atkins (1994), author and journalist
- Margaret Boozer (1989), ceramist and sculpture artist
- Ashley Crow (1982), movie and TV actress
- Gianna Dior, pornographic actress
- Tim Dorsey (1983), author
- Kenneth R. Giddens (1931), director of Voice of America and founder of WKRG-TV, Inc. in Mobile, Alabama
- Thom Gossom, Jr. (1975), actor
- Sophia Bracy Harris (B.S. 1972), child care leader, MacArthur Fellow (1991)
- Daniel L. Haulman (1983 PhD), aviation historian and writer
- Kate Higgins (1991), voice actress, notably Sakura Haruno on Naruto
- Bill Holbrook (1980), cartoonist, On The Fast Track, Safe Havens and Kevin & Kell
- Jimmy Johnson (1974), cartoonist, Arlo and Janis
- Rheta Grimsley Johnson (1977), syndicated newspaper columnist
- Kelly Kazek (1987), journalist and author
- Justice Leak (2003), actor, The Great Debaters
- Richard Marcinko (M.A. Political Science), founder U.S. Navy SEAL Team SIX and Red Cell; author of Rogue Warrior and other fiction and non-fiction books
- Big Bill Morganfield (Communications), blues singer and guitarist
- Augusta Oelschig, artist and art teacher
- Michael O'Neill (1974), actor
- Kimberly Page (1990), actress and professional wrestling valet
- Lallah Miles Perry (1945), artist and painter
- Van Allen Plexico (1990 B.A., 1994 M.A.), award-winning author and educator
- Selena Roberts (1988), author, sportswriter, and digital entrepreneur
- Jeanne Robertson (1967), comedian and humorist, Miss North Carolina 1963, SEC Entrepreneur of the Year in 2000
- Gerald Roush (1968 B.A., 1973 M.A.), Ferrari historian, publisher of the Ferrari Market Letter
- Phillip Sandifer (1977–78), writer, recording artist
- Jason Sanford (1993), science fiction author
- Elmo Shropshire (1964), veterinarian and singer, best known for "Grandma Got Run Over by a Reindeer"
- Abbie Stockard, Miss America 2025
- Anne Rivers Siddons (1958), author
- Eugene Sledge (1955), World War II Marine and later professor of biology, author of With the Old Breed: At Peleliu and Okinawa
- Octavia Spencer (1994), Oscar, BAFTA, Golden Globe and SAG Award-winning actress
- William Spratling (1921), silversmith and artist, "father of Mexican silver"
- Travis S. Taylor (1991), science fiction author and host of Rocket City Rednecks on National Geographic Channel
- Toni Tennille (1962), award-winning singer, half of the singing group Captain & Tennille
- Cynthia Tucker (1976), syndicated columnist, Atlanta Journal-Constitution editorial page editor, Pulitzer Prize winner
- Katherine Webb (2012), Miss Alabama USA 2012; Top 10 at Miss USA 2012
- Dave Williamson, stand-up comedian
- Drake White, country music singer
- Jake Adam York (1993), poet

== Athletics ==
- Willie Anderson (1996), National Football League (NFL) offensive tackle
- William Andrews (1978), former all-pro running back for the Atlanta Falcons
- Billy Atkins, NFL defensive back and punter
- Joanna Atkins (2011), NCAA track and field champion 2009 and multiple-time international medalist
- Tom Banks (1970), NFL professional player and four-time Pro Bowler with the St. Louis Cardinals
- Blayne Barber (2012), professional golfer, PGA Tour
- Charles Barkley (1986), retired NBA player, 11x NBA All-Star, NBA MVP
- Fred Beasley (1997), NFL professional player; one-time Pro Bowler and two-time All-Pro with the San Francisco 49ers
- Terry Beasley (1971), All American wide receiver
- Mark Bellhorn (1995), Major League Baseball player (played for World Series-winning Red Sox in 2004)
- Rob Bironas (2000), professional football player; one-time Pro Bowler and one-time All-Pro
- George Bovell (2009), Olympic silver medal swimmer for Trinidad and Tobago
- Dieter Brock, Canadian Football League and NFL player
- James Brooks (1980), four-time Pro Bowl NFL running back
- Bryce Brown (2019), player in the Israeli Basketball Premier League, formerly in the G League
- Ronnie Brown (2004), professional football player and first round NFL draft pick by the Miami Dolphins
- Aundray Bruce (1987), NFL player
- Jason Campbell (2004), professional football player and first round NFL draft pick by the Washington Redskins
- Randy Campbell (1984), 1983 SEC Championship quarterback, president of Campbell Wealth Management, LLC
- Kirsty Coventry (2006), Olympic gold medal swimmer for Zimbabwe; president of the IOC
- Joe Cribbs (1980), NFL running back with the Buffalo Bills
- Marquis Daniels (2003), NBA basketball player for the Boston Celtics, 2004 NBA All-Rookie Second Team
- Stephen Davis (1996), NFL running back
- Josh Donaldson, third baseman for the New York Yankees, 2015 AL MVP
- Toney Douglas (2005), basketball player in the Israeli Basketball Premier League
- Jason Dufner (2000), winner of the 2013 PGA Championship, PGA Tour
- Tucker Frederickson (1965), All American running back, NFL running back, New York Giants
- Rowdy Gaines (1982), Olympic gold medalist, world record holder and television sports commentator
- Frank Gatski (1945), NFL Hall of Famer with the Cleveland Brown
- Matt Geiger (1989), NBA center with the Orlando Magic
- Kevin Greene (1985), Pro-Bowl NFL linebacker and WCW pro wrestler
- Jared Harper (born 1997), basketball player for Hapoel Jerusalem of the Israeli Basketball Premier League, former NBA player
- Dave Hill (1962), American Football League and NFL player with the Kansas City Chiefs
- Billy Hitchcock (1938), professional baseball infielder, coach, manager and scout
- Jimmy Hitchcock (1932), Major League Baseball player; Auburn's first All-American in both football and baseball
- Margaret Hoelzer (2005), Olympic medalist (100m backstroke, 200m backstroke, and 4x100 medley relay)
- Roderick Hood (2003), professional football player
- John Hudson (1989), professional football player
- Tim Hudson (1997), professional baseball pitcher with the Oakland Athletics, Atlanta Braves, and San Francisco Giants, four time All-Star
- Stephen Huss (2000), 2005 Wimbledon men's doubles champion, the first-ever as a qualifier
- Bo Jackson (1992), 1985 Heisman trophy winner, professional football and baseball player
- Eddie Johnson (1976), NBA All-Star guard
- Rudi Johnson (2001), professional football running back
- Denver Jones (2025), basketball player in the Israeli Basketball Premier League
- Beverly Kearney (1981), head women's track and field coach at the University of Texas
- Patton Kizzire, professional golfer (2008)
- Mike Kolen (1969), NFL linebacker with the Miami Dolphins
- Sunisa Lee (2025), artistic gymnast, 2020 Olympic all-around champion
- Marcus McNeill (2005), NFL player and Pro Bowler with the San Diego Chargers
- John Mengelt (1970), NBA guard
- Dave Middleton (1954), NFL player with the Detroit Lions
- Alvin Mitchell, football player
- Mike Mitchell (1978), 12-year NBA player
- Chris Morris (1987), NBA forward
- Cam Newton (2015), NFL quarterback, 2010 Heisman Trophy winner, 1st pick of the 2011 NFL draft, 2011 NFL Rookie of the Year, and 2015 NFL MVP
- Cody Parkey (2013), NFL Pro Bowl kicker
- Chuck Person (1986), NBA forward, 1987 NBA Rookie of the Year
- Wesley Person (1987), NBA guard
- Jay Ratliff (2004), professional football player; four-time Pro Bowler and one-time All-Pro with the Dallas Cowboys
- Tony Richardson (1994), professional football player; three-time Pro Bowler with the Kansas City Chiefs and Minnesota Vikings
- Quentin Riggins (1990), player of gridiron football
- Tracy Rocker (1989), professional football player, 1988 Outland Award winner and 1988 Lombardi Trophy winner
- Carlos Rogers (2004), professional football player and first round NFL draft pick by the Washington Redskins
- Erk Russell (1949), four-sport letterman, first and long-time coach of the Georgia Southern Eagles football team winning three NCAA Division I-AA championships (1985, 1986, 1989)
- Frank Sanders (1994), NFL player
- Takeo Spikes (1998),NFL linebacker
- Josh Sullivan, Major League Baseball pitcher
- Pat Sullivan (1971), All American quarterback, Heisman Trophy winner
- Frank Thomas (1989), Major League Baseball player, 2014 National Baseball Hall of Fame inductee
- Cliff Toney (1981), football player
- Sesugh Uhaa, professional wrestler, wrestling name Apollo Crews
- Marcus Washington (1999), NFL Pro Bowl player
- Ed West (1983), professional football player
- Austin Wiley (born 1999), basketball player for Hapoel Jerusalem of the Israeli Basketball Premier League
- Carnell "Cadillac" Williams (2004), NFL player; 2005 NFL first round draft pick by the Tampa Bay Buccaneers
- Alexander Wright (1989), NFL player

== Athletic coaches ==
- Tim Beckman (1989 M.A.), head football coach at University of Illinois at Urbana–Champaign
- Vince Dooley (1954 B.S., M.A. History 1963), University of Georgia head football coach, 1964–1988; athletic director, 1979–2004
- Ralph "Shug" Jordan (1932), coach of Auburn Tigers football team, 1951–1975; most wins in Auburn history, including 1957's 10–0 season and 1957 National Championship
- Beverly Kearney (1981), head women's track and field coach at University of Texas
- Tony Levine (2003 master's; educational specialist in adult education), football coach
- David Marsh (1981 B.A.), head swimming coach of Auburn University, 1990–2007
- Will Muschamp (1996 M.A.), college football coach, former head coach at University of Florida and University of South Carolina
- Richard Quick, Auburn men's and women's head swimming coach (1978–1982 and 2007–2009)
- Erk Russell (1946 B.A., 1949 M.A), football coach at Georgia Southern, 1981–1989
- Tim Stowers (1980 B.S. 1982 M.E.), football coach at Georgia Southern, 1990–1995

== Business and economics ==
- Donald J. Boudreaux (1986), economist
- John Brown (1957), former CEO and chairman of the board, Stryker Corporation
- Tim Cook (1982), CEO of Apple Inc.
- Joe Forehand (1971), former chairman and CEO of Accenture
- Millard Fuller (1957), founder of Habitat for Humanity
- Samuel Ginn (1959), wireless communications pioneer; former chairman of Vodafone
- Bill L. Harbert (1948), businessman and founder of B.L. Harbert International
- John M. Harbert (1946), businessman and founder of Harbert Corporation
- Raymond J. Harbert (1982), founder, chairman and CEO of Harbert Management Corporation; trustee; namesake of the Raymond J. Harbert College of Business
- Don Logan (1966), former CEO of Time Inc.; chairman of Time Warner Media and Communications Group; former chairman of Time Warner Cable
- Mohamed Mansour (1971 MBA), billionaire, chairman of Mansour Group
- Youssef Mansour (1972 MBA), Egyptian billionaire businessman
- Jimmy Rane (1968), billionaire founder of Great Southern Wood Preserving
- Mark Spencer (1999), president and CEO of Digium, creator of Asterisk PBX
- Mark Thornton (1989 Ph.D.), economist
- Jimmy Wales (1989), co-founder of Wikipedia
- Arthur L. Williams, Jr. (M.S.), insurance executive

== Government and politics ==
- Rick Allen (1973), U.S. representative from Georgia
- Rick Austin (1993), former Georgia state representative
- Spencer Bachus (1969), congressman, U.S. House of Representatives
- Bobby Bright (1975), former congressman from Alabama's 2nd congressional district; former mayor of Montgomery
- Rick Bright (1997), immunologist and virologist, director of the Biomedical Advanced Research and Development Authority at the U.S. Department of Health and Human Services
- James R. Bullington, diplomat and former ambassador to Burundi
- LTG Ronald L. Burgess, Jr. (USA, Ret.) (1974), 17th director of the Defense Intelligence Agency, 2009–2012
- Mark Butler, member of Georgia House of Representatives 1993–2011, elected statewide as Georgia Commissioner of Labor 2011–2023
- Joyce Chandler, former educator and member of the Georgia House of Representatives
- Bubba Copeland, mayor of Smiths Station, Alabama (2016–2023)
- Kirsty Coventry, former minister of Youth, Sport, Arts and Recreation in the Cabinet of Zimbabwe; president of the IOC
- Nader Dahabi, former prime minister of the Hashemite Kingdom of Jordan
- Loula Friend Dunn, social worker, public welfare administrator, and first female executive director of the American Public Welfare Association
- Amir Eshel, major general; former commander-in-chief of the Israeli Air Force
- Jennifer Fidler, member of the Alabama House of Representatives
- Matthew Hammett, member of the Alabama House of Representatives
- Ben Harrison, member of the Alabama House of Representatives
- Frances Holk-Jones, member of the Alabama House of Representatives
- Michael Hood, lieutenant general; former commander of the Royal Canadian Air Force
- Kay Ivey (1967), governor of Alabama, 2017–present; 30th lieutenant governor of Alabama, 2011–2017
- Fob James (1957), governor of Alabama, 1979–1983, 1995–1999
- Bill Lee (1981), governor of Tennessee, 2019–present
- Ron Littlefield (1968), mayor of Chattanooga, Tennessee, 2005–2013
- Jamie Lowe (1999), politician, chair of the Lee County, Alabama Democratic Party
- Cole McNary, Republican member of the Missouri House of Representatives, 2009–2013
- Harold D. Melton (1988), Georgia Supreme Court justice, 2005–present
- Brady E. Mendheim Jr., Supreme Court of Alabama justice
- Barry Moore (1992), U.S. representative from Alabama
- Richard Myers, general (USAF, Ret.) (1967, M.S.), chairman of the Joint Chiefs of Staff for the United States
- Bill Nichols (1939), former U.S. congressman for the 3rd District of Alabama and former president pro tempore of the Auburn University Board of Trustees
- Rick Pate (1978), commissioner of Alabama Department of Agriculture and Industries
- Gordon Persons (1922), governor of Alabama, 1951–1955
- Major Gen. Wilton B. Persons (1916), special adviser to President Eisenhower
- Renee A. Roche (1980), judge, Florida Ninth Judicial Circuit
- Mike Shaw, member of the Alabama House of Representatives
- Joe Turnham (1981), former Alabama Democratic Party Chairman and congressional candidate
- Sidney A. Wallace (1969), rear admiral (USCG, Ret.)
- Susan Whitson (1991), press secretary, Office of First Lady Laura Bush
- Matt Woods, member of the Alabama House of Representatives

== Religious leaders ==
- Russell Kendrick (1984), bishop of the Episcopal Diocese of the Central Gulf Coast

== Military ==
- Douglas J. Adams (1992), United States Navy rear admiral
- Jimmie V. Adams (1957), US general
- Lloyd J. Austin III (1985), United States Army general; commander of United States Central Command, 2013–2016; United States Secretary of Defense, 2021–2025
- Robert E. Bailey (1975), United States Air Force lieutenant general, director of installations and military support at Headquarters, Air Force Reserve Command
- Robert Lee Bullard, United States Army lieutenant general, commander, Second US Army in World War I
- Lincoln Jones (M.P.S., 1969), United States Army major general
- Jay W. Kelley (1973), United States Air Force lieutenant general, commander of Air University, Maxwell Air Force Base
- David A. Krumm (1989, 1990), United States Air Force lieutenant general, retired, former commander Alaskan Command
- James E. Livingston (1962), USMC major general and Medal of Honor recipient
- Mike Minihan (1989), United States Air Force general, commander Air Mobility Command
- Carl Mundy, Jr. (1957), commandant of the United States Marine Corps (1991–1995)
- Robert Ernest Noble (B.S. 1890, M.S. 1891), Alabama Polytechnic Institute graduate who served as a major general in the U.S. Army
- Eric O'Neill (1995), FBI investigative specialist; key figure in arrest of double-agent Robert Hanssen; subject of the 2007 film Breach
- Michael S. Rogers, United States Navy admiral; director of NSA; commander of US Cyber Command
- Paul Selva (1992), United States Air Force; vice chairman of the Joint Chiefs of Staff
- Hugh Shelton (1973, M.S.), retired general; chairman of the Joint Chiefs of Staff, 1997–2001
- Eugene Bondurant Sledge (B.S. 1949, M.S. 1955), Alabama Polytechnic Institute graduate who served as a corporal in the U.S. Marine Corps during World War II, author of With the Old Breed: At Peleliu and Okinawa
- James C. Slife (1989), United States Air Force lieutenant general, commander of Air Force Special Operations Command
- Holland Smith (1901), United States Marine Corps general, "father of modern U.S. amphibious warfare"
- Johnny Micheal Spann (1992), first American killed in combat after the U.S. invasion of Afghanistan
- Alvin Vogtle, World War II fighter pilot who inspired Steve McQueen's character in The Great Escape
- H. Marshal Ward (1982), United States Air Force general, retired in 2001

== Science and engineering ==
- Byron Lavoy Cockrell (1957), aeronautical engineer and rocket scientist
- Tim Cook (1982), Apple CEO
- Lester Crawford (1963), former Food and Drug Administration Commissioner
- Wilbur Davenport, engineer and scientist known for his work on communication systems; member of the National Academy of Engineering (1975)
- Jan Davis (1977), astronaut, STS-47, STS-60
- Hank Hartsfield (1954), astronaut, STS-4, STS-41-D, STS-61-A
- Miller Reese Hutchison (1897), inventor of the electric hearing aid and Klaxon automobile horn
- Joni E. Johnston, licensed clinical psychologist and author
- Hugh S. Knowles, member of the National Academy of Engineering (1969)
- James Lansford (1980), electrical engineer
- Francis Ernest Lloyd (1906–1912), botanist; president of the Royal Society of Canada, 1932–33
- Joseph Majdalani, professor of aerospace engineering
- Ken Mattingly (1958), astronaut, Apollo 13 (pulled), Apollo 16 (spacewalk), STS-4, STS-51-C
- Cherri M. Pancake (Ph.D. 1986), elected fellow (2001) and president (2018–) of the ACM
- Jessica A. Scoffield, microbiologist and professor at the University of Alabama at Birmingham
- Kathryn Thornton (1974), astronaut; second US woman to perform a spacewalk; STS-33, STS-49, STS-61, STS-73
- James Voss (1972), astronaut, STS-44, STS-53, STS-69, STS-101, ISS
- Paul B. Weisz (B.S.), National Medal of Technology and Innovation recipient (1992) and member of the National Academy of Engineering (1977)
- Clifton Williams (1954), Gemini astronaut, test pilot

== Notable students who attended but did not graduate ==
- Jimmy Buffett (1946–2023), singer/songwriter; a pledge of Sigma Pi fraternity, but graduated from The University of Southern Mississippi
- César Cielo, won three Olympic medals for swimming; current world record holder in the 100-metre and 50-metre freestyle
- Tom Cochran (1924–2010), former fullback for the NFL
- Jon Coffelt (1986), artist, painter, sculptor
- Ricky Dillon, YouTube personality
- Toney Douglas, NBA basketball player for the Houston Rockets
- Dan Evins, entrepreneur and founder of Cracker Barrel
- Nick Fairley, NFL defensive tackle, 2010 Lombardi Award Winner and 13th pick in the 2011 NFL draft
- Tucker Frederickson, All-American and NFL running back for the New York Giants (1965–1971)
- Bobby Goldsboro, singer
- Mallory Hagan, Miss America 2013
- Taylor Hicks, singer, winner on season five of American Idol
- Josh Hopkins, actor, Cougar Town; member of Lambda Chi Alpha fraternity
- Tim Hudson (1997), Major League Baseball pitcher for the San Francisco Giants
- Victoria Jackson, comedian of Saturday Night Live fame ("I went to three colleges and Auburn was my last one and favorite one.")
- Brandon Jacobs, NFL running back
- Rudi Johnson, NFL running back
- Ella Langley (2017-2019), singer-songwriter, first female artist to simultaneously top the Billboard Hot 100, Hot Country Songs, and Country Airplay charts
- Suni Lee, gymnast, 6-time Olympic medalist including 2020 All-Around Champion
- Paul McDonald, singer, songwriter, placed 8th on tenth season of American Idol and lead singer of the Grand Magnolias
- John Mengelt, former NBA player 1971–1981 and network ABC basketball analyst
- Herman Clarence Nixon, professor, member of the Southern Agrarians
- Lionel Richie, Grammy award-winning singer, notable for his contribution to the Commodores
- Red Smith (1912), Major League Baseball third baseman for Brooklyn
- Frank Thomas, professional baseball player and 2014 National Baseball Hall of Fame inductee

== Faculty ==
- Fred Allison, physicist, created the physics department at Auburn and was Dean of the Graduate School
- Frank W. Applebee, painter, head of the art department at Auburn University
- Herbert W. Ehrgott, U.S. Air Force general
- Wayne Flynt, professor emeritus; authority on Alabamian history and Baptist history in Alabama; author of 11 books, including the Pulitzer-nominated Poor But Proud: Alabama's Poor Whites
- Thomas M. Humphrey, economist
- Olav Kallenberg, mathematician known for research in the field of probability theory
- Krystyna Kuperberg, mathematician known for creating a counterexample to the Seifert conjecture
- Nathaniel Thomas Lupton, professor of chemistry
- William Vann Parker, head of math department and dean of the graduate school
- Henry Rolle, track and field coach 1998–2018
- Mel Rosen, track coach
- Charles Richard Saunders, dean of the School of Chemistry
- Mrinal Thakur, mechanical engineering faculty, co-discoverer of conducting polymers
- Terry Todd, Women's Powerlifting Hall of Fame
- James Voss, former U.S. astronaut and veteran of five spaceflights; teaches courses on space mission design
