= Harbert =

Harbert is a surname. Notable people with the surname include:

- Bill L. Harbert (1923–2010), American businessman
- Chick Harbert (1915–1992), American golfer
- Elizabeth Boynton Harbert (1843–1925), American author, lecturer, reformer, philanthropist
- John M. Harbert (1921–1995), American businessman
- Marguerite Harbert (1924–2015), American billionaire
- Raymond J. Harbert (born 1958), American businessman and philanthropist.
- Ted Harbert (born 1955), American television personality and chief executive
- William Soesbe Harbert (1842–1919), American lawyer, judge, activist and philanthropist

== See also ==
- Harbert Management Corporation, American investment management company
- Harbert Hills Academy, a school in Savannah, Tennessee
- Harbert Landing, Mississippi, a ghost town in Mississippi
