= William Vann Parker =

American mathematician (1901–1987)

William "Vann" Parker
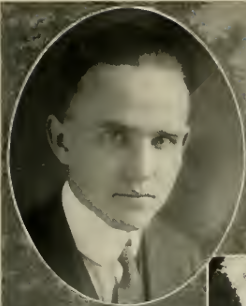
- Born: 22 December 1901; Monroe, North Carolina, US
- Died: November 25, 1987 (aged 85); Birmingham, Alabama, US
- Education: University of North Carolina; Princeton University; Brown University
- Spouse: Carolyn Adele Edwards
- Children: 3
- Scientific career
- Fields: classical algebra, convex and discrete geometry, linear and multilinear algebra, matrix theory
- Workplaces: University of the South; University of North Carolina; Princeton University; Mississippi Woman's College; Georgia Institute of Technology; Louisiana State University; University of Georgia; Auburn University
- Thesis: The Addition Formulas for Hyperelliptic Functions (1931)
- Doctoral advisor: Albert Arnold Bennett

William "Vann" Parker (December 22, 1901 – November 25, 1987) was an American mathematician who worked primarily in classical algebra. He was chair of the mathematics department at both Louisiana State University in the 1940s and Auburn University in the 1950s. He was also the Graduate Dean at Auburn during integration in Alabama.

== Early life and education ==
On December 22, 1901, Parker was born in Monroe, North Carolina to Benjamin Franklin Parker and Sarah Della Cox. He obtained a Bachelor of Arts degree from University of North Carolina in 1923 followed by a Master of Arts degree the following year. While at the University of North Carolina, he was a member of the Di Society, Math Club, Elisha Mitchell Scientific Society, and Union Country Club. He was also an Assistant Instructor in Mathematics during his senior year. He attended Princeton University between 1926 and 1927; and eventually obtain a PhD at Brown University in 1931 under his advisor Albert Arnold Bennett.

== Career ==
In 1924, he began teaching at the University of the South until 1925. He would then teach at the University of North Carolina between 1925 and 1931. During his attendance at Princeton University he taught there as well. In 1931, he started teaching at Mississippi Woman's College until 1934. He then started teaching at Georgia Institute of Technology in 1934 until 1936 where he was one of the first people hired there to have a doctorate degree. In 1936, he became an associate professor at Louisiana State University where he advised Anthony Aucoin (1940) and John Currie (1948). In 1943, he would become the head of the math department at Louisiana State University until leaving in 1947. He then became a regents professor at University of Georgia between 1947 and 1950.

=== Years at Auburn ===
In 1950 he became the head of the mathematics department at Alabama Polytechnic Institute, now known as Auburn University, a role he would hold until 1965. He is credited for creating the mathematics program at Auburn. In 1953, he took on the additional role of Graduate Dean at Auburn until his retirement on July 1, 1972. From 1953 to 1971 he was a council representative of Auburn University for the Oak Ridge Associated Universities. At Auburn he advised, Robert Ackerson (1955) and Marion Wicht Sr. (1957). As head of the Math Department in 1960, he traveled to near Washington, D.C. to interviewed Emillie Haynsworth by having her work on a research problem with him in matrix theory until the end of his trip when he stated that she could have a job at Auburn.

While he was the dean of the graduate school he oversaw the first doctorate programs at Auburn. As dean of the graduate school, he was the defendant in the court case Franklin v. Parker. Parker rejected Harold Franklin's application to the graduate school at Auburn for not graduating from a college that was accredited with the Southern Association of Colleges and Schools. The court found that this is a reasonable policy in an ideal world. However, given that Alabama only accredited the white schools and let the black schools accreditations to expire, Parker was found to have discriminated against Franklin by following the policy that he was instructed to follow. In January 1964, Parker and Malcolm McMillan, a history professor, helped Franklin register for classes at the library while the national guard ensured their safety from the crowds.

== Awards and honors ==
He was a member of the Mathematics Association of America. He helped start the Alabama Association of College Teachers of Mathematics. He was a member of Sigma Xi and Pi Mu Epsilon.

He was listed in Who's Who in America for 1976–1977. He was also included in Who's Who in the South and Southwest, Who's Who Education, Who's Who Atoms, American Men of Science, and Leaders in American Science.

== Personal life ==
He married the genealogist and writer Carolyn Adele Edwards on July 3, 1926. In February 1960, Carolyn became a member of the United Daughters of the Confederacy, Admiral Semmes Chapter in Auburn, Al. Carolyn and Vann Parker had a son and two daughters. For more than 60 years, he was a part of the University Masonic Lodge at Chapel Hill.

His daughter Emily "Anne" Parker Battle followed in his footsteps studying mathematics and then teaching mathematics at the University of Alabama at Birmingham and the University of Montevallo.

== Death and legacy ==
In his honor, the Auburn Board of Trustees decided to name the mathematics building Parker Hall. Parker died on November 25, 1987, in Birmingham, Alabama, and was buried at Auburn Memorial Park Cemetery. The Alabama Association of College Teachers of Mathematics holds a lecture named after Parker and Fred A. Lewis of the University of Alabama at their annual meeting called the "Lewis-Parker Lecture" to honor a mathematician from the state of Alabama.

List of speakers for the Lewis-Parker Lecture
Number	Year	Speaker	Institution
0	1990	John Mayer	UAB
1	1991	Karen Ames	UAH
2	1992	Bertram Zinner	Auburn
3	1993	Scott Carter	USA
4	1994	Martyn Dixon	UA
5	1995	Wlodek Kuperberg	Auburn
6	1996	Dan Flath	USA
7	1997	Serge E. Troubetzkoy	UAB
8	1998	Jan Dijkstra	UAB
9	1999	Claudio Morales	UAH
10	2000	Xin-Min Zhang	USA
11	2001	Jack Brown	Auburn
12	2002	John Mayer	UAB
13	2003	Olav Kallenberg	Auburn
14	2004	Peter Slater	UAH
15	2005	Chris Roger	Auburn
16	2006	David Halpern	UA
17	2007	Frank Jellett	USA
18	2008	Tom Barr	DiscoveryBioMed
19	2009	Vitaly Voloshin	Troy
20	2010	Krystyna Kuperberg	Auburn
21	2011	Zhijian Wu	UA
22	2012	Jia Li	UAH
23	2013	Nandor Simanyi	UAB
24	2014	Michel Smith	Auburn
25	2015	Kabe Moen	UA
26	2016	Wenxian Shen	Auburn
27	2017	John Mayer	UAB
28	2018	Bulent Tosun	UA
29	2019	Cornelius Pillen	USA
30	2020	Dan Silver	USA
31	2022	Jim Gleason	UA
32	2023	Frank Pantane	Samford University
33	2024	Kyungyong Lee	UA
34	2025	Carmeliza Navasca	UAB
35	2026	Arik Wilbert	USA

== Selected works ==
In 1960, he wrote the book Matrices with James Clifton Eaves.

- Parker, William Vann; Eaves, James Clifton (1960). Matrices. Ronald Press Company.

== See also ==
- Fred Allison
- Charles Richard Saunders
- Harold Franklin
- List of American mathematicians
- History of Auburn University
