= Mrinal =

Mrinal is an Indian male name. The feminine counterpart of the name is Mrinalini. Other variations of the name include Mrunal (or Mrunalini) depending upon the linguistics of origin of the person. Some notable personalities with this name include:

- Mrinal Das, Indian trade unionist
- Mrinal Gore, Indian politician
- Mrinal Haque, Bangladeshi sculptor
- Mrinal Hazarika, ex-commander of the 28th Battalion of ULFA, the banned revolutionary organisation of Assam
- Mrinal Pande, Indian television personality
- Mrinal Sen, Indian Bengali film director
- Mrinal Thakur, academic

== See also ==
- Mrunal Thakur, an Indian film and TV actress
