= Marguerite Harbert =

American philanthropist and billionaire

- Born: Marguerite Jones; 1923; Birmingham, Alabama
- Died: March 17, 2015 (aged 91); Mountain Brook, Alabama
- Education: Mountain Brook Elementary School; Phillips High School
- Alma mater: Birmingham–Southern College
- Occupation: Philanthropist
- Spouse: John M. Harbert
- Children: 3, including Raymond J. Harbert
- Parent(s): Raymond McAdoo Jones; Marguerite Nabers Jones

Marguerite Jones Harbert (1923 – March 17, 2015) was an American philanthropist and billionaire from Alabama.

== Early life ==
Margarite Jones was born in 1923 in Birmingham, Alabama. Her father was Raymond McAdoo Jones and her mother, Marguerite Nabers Jones. She had a sister, Alice McGriff. She descended from Birmingham's founders.

She was educated at Mountain Brook Elementary School and Phillips High School. She graduated from Birmingham–Southern College, where she served as president of the Kappa Delta sorority chapter.

== Philanthropy ==
Jones worked for the American Red Cross in Jefferson County, Alabama. Later, she volunteered for the "Junior League of Birmingham, Advent Day School, All-Saints School, Children's Hospital, Center for Developmental Learning Disabilities, Spain Rehabilitation, Birmingham Art Association, Birmingham Ballet League, American Heart Association and Linly Heflin Unit." A member of the American Needlepoint Guild, she needlepointed an armchair for Alabama Governor's Mansion.

She served on the Board of Trustees of her alma mater, Birmingham-Southern College, where the Marguerite Jones Harbert Building was named in her honor. She was also inducted into its Sports Hall of Fame in 2006. She also served on the Boards of Trustees of the Birmingham Museum of Art and Cancer Comprehensive. Additionally, she served on the Board of Regents of the Smithsonian Institution.

== Personal life ==
She married John M. Harbert, the founder of Harbert Corporation, whom she had met in grade school. They had two sons, John Murdoch Harbert IV (born with William's Syndrome) and Raymond J. Harbert (who founded Harbert Management Corporation in 1993), and a daughter, Marguerite Harbert Gray. They resided in Mountain Brook, Alabama, and summered in Highlands, North Carolina. They attended St. Mary's on-the-Highlands Episcopal Church.

The couple were married for 43 years. In 1995, her husband predeceased her, and upon his death, she inherited his fortune. By 2013, she was the wealthiest person in Alabama, with an estimated wealth of US$1.5 billion.

She was a member of the Nineteenth Century Club and the Little Garden Club of America.

== Death ==
She died on March 17, 2015.
