= Jimmy Johnson (cartoonist) =

American comic strip cartoonist

Jimmy Johnson is an American comic strip cartoonist who writes and draws Arlo and Janis.

== Early life and early work ==
Johnson was born and grew up in Lanett, Alabama, graduating from Lanett High School in 1970. He is an alumnus of Auburn University where he was a member of Phi Kappa Tau fraternity, class of 1974.

"My earliest cartoon work was copying Fred and Barney and Yogi Bear. I became quite proficient and was able to amaze my friends," wrote Johnson. Johnson credits his mother with being especially supportive of his early artwork.

Johnson noted an early endeavor related to his future profession in a 2020 blog entry: "When I was in college, I did a comic strip for the weekly student newspaper. It was about a hapless hippie (Yes, that term was alive and well back then.) named 'Arlo.' Indirectly, the character was named for Arlo Guthrie. I say 'indirectly,' because I had a buddy named Pat whom we had nicknamed 'Arlo,' because he had a shocking mane of long curly hair, much like the singer. Basically, I just wanted to annoy him."

As a young man just out of college, Johnson briefly worked as a reporter and in the public relations department of Auburn University. In 1979, he drew a recruiting poster for Auburn University that was banned. In the years before Arlo and Janis, from about 1980 to 1985, Johnson drew cartoons professionally for newspapers. He did so on a part-time basis when he was a reporter and editor, and then full-time as an editorial cartoonist in Jackson, Mississippi. While employed in this role, Johnson won the Robert F. Kennedy Journalism Award.

== Arlo and Janis ==
Beginning in 1985, Johnson drew Arlo and Janis for national syndication by the Newspaper Enterprise Association. Johnson said, "At the time I sold Arlo & Janis to the newspaper syndicate United Media in 1985, there were a lot of 'talking animal' strips. Newspaper editors reacted to this by demanding more comic strips about human beings, particularly young families. So, it really was a market-driven thing."

Johnson cites Mort Walker as an influence on his comic strip work, putting him at the head of "a cabal of talented and successful humorists who were redefining the newspaper comic strip in a post-war world." Mel Lazarus, Johnny Hart, Dik Browne, Charles Schulz, Bud Blake are also mentioned. "As a youngster, I read them all in their heyday," Johnson recalls. "These men were the primary influence upon me, and foremost among them was the enterprising and prolific Walker."

Naming other direct influences on his work, Johnson cites "the old Warner Bros. Looney Tunes animated cartoons, originally produced for theater audiences of all ages... Even as a kid, I could appreciate a subtle, grown-up wit that absolutely was missing in the Disney cartoons that dominated the scene in my day." Johnson also describes himself as a "huge fan of Scrooge McDuck comic books and the work of Carl Barks."

Unsatisfied with the line-quality produced when he experimented with markers, Johnson draws the strip in traditional comic strip fashion, "with an old-fashioned pen nib and India ink on 2-ply Bristol paper." But Johnson scans the finished drawings electronically for transmission to the syndicate editors. Syndicate colorists colored the daily strips until 2018, when Johnson took on the work. He has long used Photoshop to color the Sunday strips himself.

In his comic strip about a small family, Johnson presents political and social commentary through his characters. Humor is also integral, and Johnson writes "jokes about many different subjects, not unlike stand-up comedians do." Much of the strip's content is grounded in "Arlo and Janis' love and continued desire for each other." Johnson's work is often sexually suggestive, and "the Arlo Award" is awarded to "cartoonists who slip one by the syndicate's censors."

== Personal life ==
Johnson was at one time married to author Rheta Grimsley Johnson, and the two remain good friends.

As of 2006, despite the damage caused by Hurricane Katrina, he owns a home in Pass Christian, Mississippi.

On April 3, 2006, he suffered a mild heart attack.
