= Jimmie V. Adams =

United States Air Force general

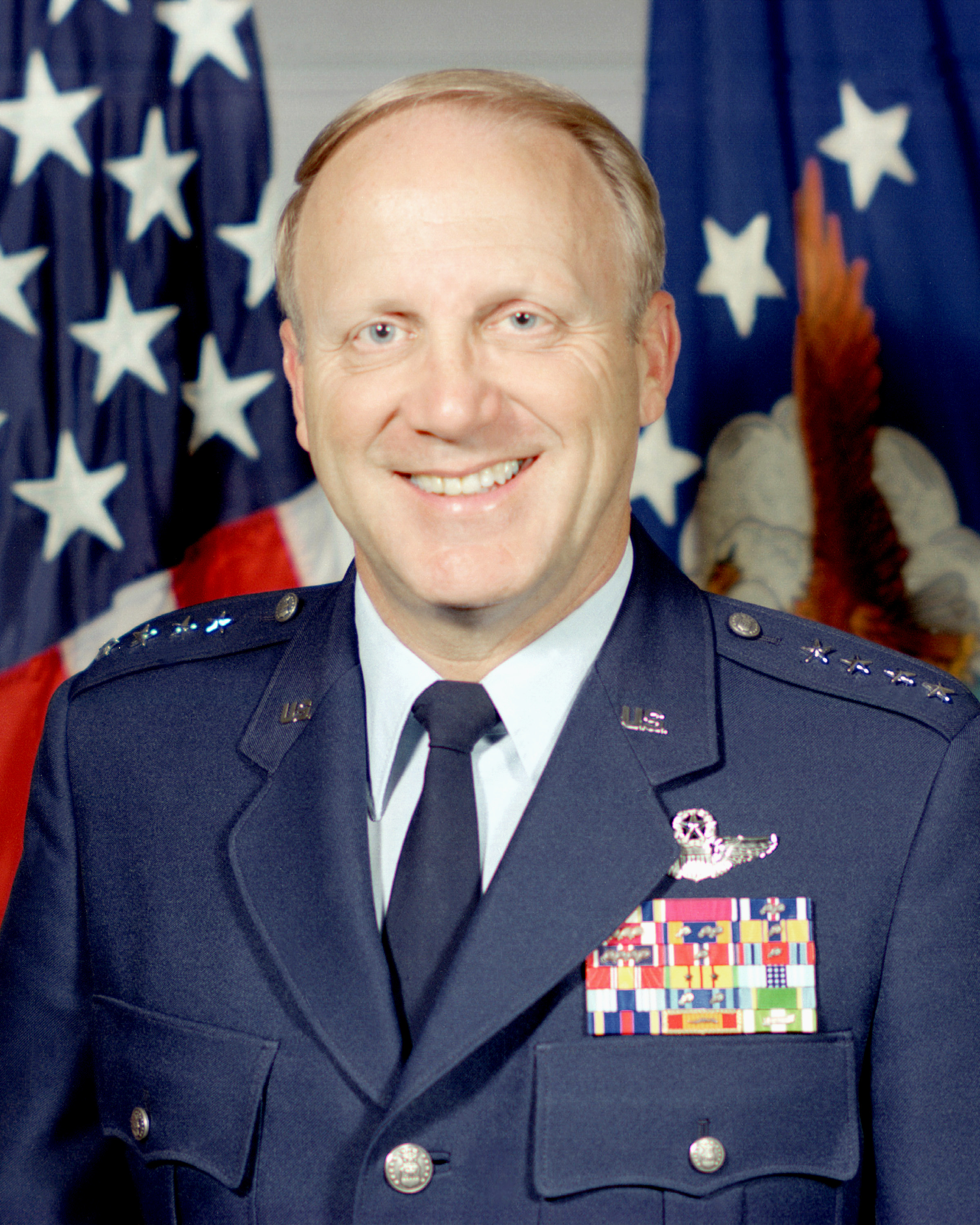
- General Jimmie V. Adams
- Born: May 1, 1936 (age 90); Prichard, Alabama, U.S.
- Military career
- Allegiance: United States of America
- Branch: United States Air Force
- Service years: 1958–1993
- Rank: General
- Commands: Pacific Air Forces; 1st Air force 23rd Tactical Fighter Wing
- Conflicts: Vietnam War
- Awards: Air Force Distinguished Service Medal; Legion of Merit; Distinguished Flying Cross; Air Medal

Jimmie Vick Adams (born May 1, 1936) is a retired four-star general in the United States Air Force (USAF). He served as commander in chief, Pacific Air Forces (CINCPACAF) from 1991 to 1993.

== Education and early life ==
Adams was born in Prichard, Alabama, in 1936. He earned a bachelor's degree in mechanical engineering from Auburn University in 1957 and a master's degree in mechanical engineering from the University of Texas in 1963. Adams completed Squadron Officer School in 1964, Industrial College of the Armed Forces in 1978 and the Joint Flag Officer Warfighting Course in 1987. He is a member of Theta Chi fraternity.

== Military career ==
He was commissioned in the USAF through the Air Force Reserve Officer Training Corps (AFROTC) and entered active duty in January 1958. Upon completion of pilot training at Webb Air Force Base, Texas, Adams flew with the 437th Fighter-Interceptor Squadron, Oxnard Air Force Base, California, until January 1962. After receiving his master's degree, he was assigned as an engineer and test pilot with the Air Force Weapons Laboratory at Kirtland Air Force Base, New Mexico, from August 1963 to May 1966.

He then served as an F-4 Phantom II aircraft commander, fighter weapons instructor and flight commander with the 78th Tactical Fighter Squadron, Royal Air Force Station Woodbridge, England. In August 1969 he was assigned as an F-4 aircraft commander to the 25th Tactical Fighter Squadron and, later, as chief, tactics officer, for the 8th Tactical Fighter Wing, Ubon Royal Thai Air Force Base, Thailand. From August 1970 to June 1973 he was a member of the AFROTC staff at Auburn University. He then transferred to Headquarters Tactical Air Command (TAC), Langley Air Force Base, Virginia, as a requirements officer.

He was assigned to Seymour Johnson Air Force Base, North Carolina in June 1975 as commander of the 336th Tactical Fighter Squadron, and then as special assistant to the deputy commander for operations with the 4th Tactical Fighter Wing, also at Seymour Johnson. After graduation from the Industrial College of the Armed Forces in July 1978, Adams served as deputy chief, then as chief, of the Tactical Requirements Division, Headquarters USAF, Washington, D.C.

In November 1979 he returned to TAC headquarters as assistant deputy chief of staff for requirements and remained there until assuming command of the 23rd Tactical Fighter Wing, England Air Force Base, Louisiana in March 1981. Adams was assigned as deputy director for operations and training, plans and operations, USAF headquarters, from April 1983 until February 1984. He then became special assistant for tactical modernization, research, development and acquisition. He was assigned as deputy chief of staff, requirements, TAC headquarters, in August 1985, and assumed command of the 1st Air Force at Langley in July 1987. In July 1988 he was assigned as TAC vice commander and vice commander in chief, U.S. Air Forces Atlantic. He became deputy chief of staff, plans and operations, USAF Headquarters, in March 1989. He assumed command of Pacific Air Forces in February 1991 and retired from the United States Air Force on February 1, 1993.

Adams was a command pilot with more than 3,800 flying hours, including 141 combat missions. He has flown numerous fighter aircraft, including the A-10 Thunderbolt II, F-4 Phantom II, F-15 Eagle, F-86 Sabre, F-89 Scorpion, F-100 Super Sabre, F-101 Voodoo and F-104 Starfighter.

His military awards and decorations include the Air Force Distinguished Service Medal, Legion of Merit, Distinguished Flying Cross with two oak leaf clusters, Meritorious Service Medal with three oak leaf clusters, Air Medal with seven oak leaf clusters, and Air Force Commendation Medal with oak leaf cluster.

- Air Force Distinguished Service Medal
- Legion of Merit
- Distinguished Flying Cross with two oak leaf clusters
- Meritorious Service Medal with three oak leaf clusters
- Air Medal with seven oak leaf clusters
- Air Force Commendation Medal with oak leaf cluster

== Post military career ==
After retiring from the military, Adams became senior vice president, Washington operations, of L-3 Communications. He also sits on the board of directors of the National Defense Industrial Association.

== See also ==
- List of Auburn University people
