= Mrinalini =

Mrinalini may refer to:

- Nelumbo nucifera or the sacred lotus

== General ==
- 2986 Mrinalini, a minor planet
- Iti Mrinalini, a 2011 Indian drama film
- Mrinalini (novel), by the Bengali author Bankim Chandra Chattopadhyay
- Mrinalini Dutta Mahavidyapith, an educational institution in Birati, West Bengal, India

== People ==
- Mrinalini Devi (died 1902), wife of author Rabindranath Tagore
- Mrinalini Sarabhai (1918–2016), Indian classical dancer
- Mrinalini Sharma, Indian model and actress
- Mrinalini Sinha (born 1960), academic
- Mrinalini Puranik, Indian scientist
- Mrinalini Mukherjee (1949–2015), Indian painter and artist
- Mrinalini Tyagi, Indian TV actress

== See also ==
- Mrunalinni Patil, Indian film director and producer
- Mirnalini Ravi, Indian actress
