= Albert Arnold Bennett =

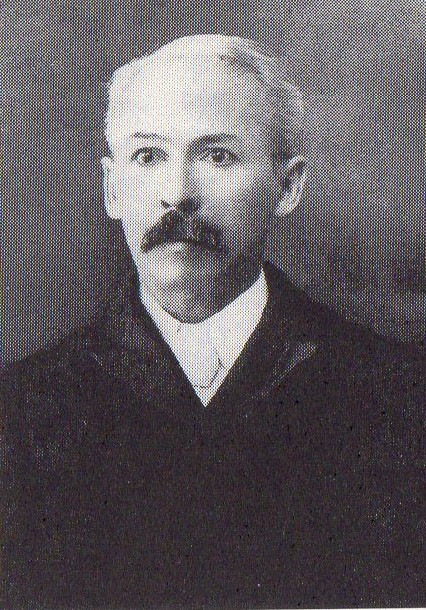
Albert Arnold Bennett Sr.

Albert Arnold Bennett Sr. (April 6, 1849 – October 12, 1909) was a Baptist missionary and hymn composer who founded the Baptist Theological Seminary of Yokohama, which later became Kanto Gakuin University.

== Early life ==
Albert was born in Pennsylvania, United States. His mother died when he was just seven. His father was a deacon of the Fifth Baptist Church of Philadelphia. Albert was a very "gentle baby and child"; because of this, his parents did not expect him to grow up.

He was baptized at the age of thirteen, and began to take part in church work, such as teaching in a mission school, calling on aged people and invalids, and conducting a weekly neighborhood meeting.

== Kanto Gakuin University ==
After Albert sailed to Japan he decided to establish a university where people of all skin colors could be taught. That was the Baptist Theological Seminary of Yokohama, which later became Kanto Gakuin University.

== Family ==
Albert was married to Mela Isabel Barrows Bennett and had seven children; Charles, Edwin, Mela, Bertha, Albert Jr., Harriet and Raymond.

== Death ==
Albert died in Yokohama in 1909. His gravestone bears the epitaph "He Lived to Serve".
