= Chetan Sankar =

- Born: India
- Citizenship: United States
- Education: B.E, MBA, PhD
- Alma mater: National Institute of Technology, Tiruchirappalli, Indian Institute of Management, Calcutta, Wharton School
- Occupation: Professor of Management Information Systems
- Organization(s): Raymond J. Harbert College of Business, Auburn University

Chetan Sankar is the Advisory Council Emeritus Professor of Management Information Systems at Raymond J. Harbert College of Business, Auburn University. He was the founder and director of the Geospatial Research and Applications Center (GRAC).

== Education ==
Chetan Sankar received his bachelor's degree in mechanical engineering from Regional Engineering College, Tiruchirappalli, India (now known as National Institute of Technology, Tiruchirappalli) in 1971. He obtained a Master of Business Administration (MBA) degree from the Indian Institute of Management, Calcutta, in 1973. He obtained Doctor of Philosophy (PhD) degree in decision sciences and information technologies from Wharton School, University of Pennsylvania in 1981.

== Awards ==
- Distinguished Alumni Award from the National Institute of Technology, Tiruchirappalli, India in 2008.
- iNEER Recognition Award by the International Network for Engineering Education and Research in 2006.
