= Albert Arnold Bennett Jr. =

American mathematician (1888–1971)

Lt Col Albert Arnold Bennett Jr.
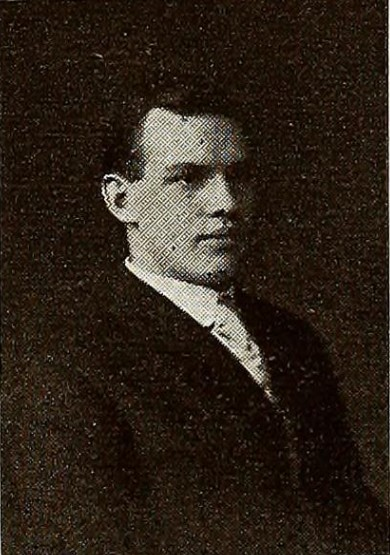
- Born: June 2, 1888; Yokohama, Japan
- Died: February 17, 1971 (aged 82)
- Other name: "A-squared Bennett"
- Citizenship: American
- Education: Brown University, Princeton University
- Known for: Founding the MAA Philadelphia Section
- Spouse: Velma McAfee Ely
- Children: 1
- Father: Albert Arnold Bennett
- Scientific career
- Thesis: An Algebraic Treatment of the Theory of Closure (1915)
- Academic advisors: Oswald Veblen
- Doctoral students: William Vann Parker
- Military career
- Allegiance: United States
- Branch: United States Army
- Service years: 1917 – 1919, 1942 – 1946
- Rank: Lieutenant Colonel
- Conflicts: World War I; World War II

Albert Arnold Bennett, Jr. PhD. (1888–1971) was an American mathematician who worked primarily in numerical analysis, modern algebra, and symbolic logic. He founded what is today the Eastern Pennsylvania and Delaware section of Mathematical Association of America (MAA).

== Early life and education ==
Bennett was born on June 2, 1888 in Yokohama, Japan to Albert Arnold Bennett Sr. and Mela Isabel Barrows Bennett. When he turned fourteen, he left Japan and went to live with other relatives to continue his education in Providence, RI. In 1910, he obtained a Bachelor of Arts degree from Brown University; in 1911, he got his master of science degree. Also in 1911, he obtained a Master of Arts degree from Princeton University. In 1915, he earned a PhD from Princeton. During his time at Princeton, he spent one year at the mathematical center at University of Göttingen.

== Career ==
=== Early career and military service ===
Bennett's dissertation was accepted into the Annals of Mathematics under the name “An algebraic treatment of the theorem of closure”. His dissertation was only 21 pages long, but was over 10% of volume for the years 1914–1915. Afterwards, he published papers on analysis in three of the four issues of the next volume and a note which accounted for over 20% of the volume for 1916–1917. In 1916, he began his faculty career as an instructor at Princeton. In 1916, he became an adjunct professor at the University of Texas at Austin. On August 15, 1917, he became an army captain during World War I where he focused on mathematical work at Aberdeen Proving Ground under Oswald Veblen. On January 15, 1919, he was honorably discharged, but remained a civilian “mathematician and dynamics expert"" for the United States Department of War until 1921.

=== Charter member of MAA and return to Brown ===
Upon return to the University of Texas in 1921 for his service he was promoted to associate professor. In 1915, he joined the MAA where he was an active member. In 1921, he was elected as a member of the Board of Governors. In 1922, the MAA elected him to be a trustee and he was appointed to be a part of the Association’s Committee on Publications. The next year, he became the editor of the American Mathematical Monthly. He then became the Vice President of the MAA and chair of the Texas Section in 1925. However, he resigned from being the chair of the Texas Section later in 1925 to accept the position of being both a professor and the chair of the Mathematics Department at Lehigh University. In 1927, he returned to Brown University as a professor of mathematics. In 1931, he graduated his first doctoral student William Vann Parker. Bennett again became vice president of MAA in 1933 and 1934.

=== World War II and retirement ===
During World War II in 1942, he returned to Aberdeen Proving Ground to be a Major under Veblen until 1946. At Ballistic Research Laboratory Herman Goldstine. Goldstine remarked of Bennett, "“From time to time I was very impatient of Albert Bennett, who was a nice old gentleman—but he was a very precise, methodical, plodding person who drove me up the wall.” Goldstine also stated that Bennett describe their effort as "wrenching the equations into a form that could be easily solved by very simple means." After the second world war, he was a ballistics expert in Tokyo, Japan where he reached the rank Lieutenant Colonel. In 1949, he graduated his second and final doctoral student Marlow Sholander. When he retired from Brown in 1958, he continued to teach as a visiting professor at Southern Illinois University, the University of Rhode Island, and Boston College. He taught at Boston College until one week before his death and upon his death he managed to be a charter member of MAA for 55 years.

== Personal life ==
During his time in Texas, Bennett came to know Velma McAfee Ely from Corsicana, Texas. They were married on June 17, 1922 and had a single daughter, Betsy Bennett Miller.

== Death and legacy ==
He died on February 17, 1971.

== Awards and honors ==
In 1932 he was elected to the American Academy of Arts and Sciences.

== Selected works ==
=== Books ===
- Bennett, Albert A. (May 1922). "Introduction to Ballistics". The American Mathematical Monthly. 29 (5): 221. doi:10.2307/2299740. JSTOR 2299740.
- Bennett, Albert. Tables for Interior Ballistics. Ordnance department.
- Bennett, Albert A.; Milne, William E.; Bateman, Harry (1956). Numerical Integration of Differential Equations. Dover.

=== Papers ===
- Bennett, Albert A. (December 1925). "Incidence and Parallelism in Biaffine Geometry". The Annals of Mathematics. 27 (2): 84–86. doi:10.2307/1967962. JSTOR 1967962.

== See also ==
- Howard Hawks Mitchell
- D. H. Lehmer
- David E. Zitarelli
