= Fred Allison =

American physicist (1882 - 1974)

Fred C. Allison
- Born: July 4, 1882; Glade Spring, Virginia, United States
- Died: August 2, 1974 (aged 92); Auburn, Alabama, United States
- Education: Johns Hopkins University; University of Virginia
- Known for: Unfounded, erroneous claim to have discovered alabamium, and virginium
- Scientific career
- Workplaces: Auburn University
- Doctoral advisor: Carroll M. Sparrow

Fred C. Allison (July 4, 1882 – August 2, 1974) was an American physicist. He developed a magneto-optic spectroscopy method that became known as the Allison magneto-optic method. He claimed to have discovered two new elements (later discredited) using this method. He taught at the Auburn University Physics Department for more than thirty years.

== Discovery of alabamine and virginium ==
From the work of Henry Moseley in 1914, it was known that several elements had not yet been discovered. Their chemical properties could be deduced from the vacant places in the periodic table of Dmitri Mendeleev. Several scientists claimed the discovery of the missing elements. During Allison's work at the Alabama Polytechnic Institute (which became Auburn University), starting in 1930, he developed a method that he believed measured the time dependence of the Faraday effect. Allison erroneously claimed that he had discovered the two missing elements with his magneto-optic spectroscopy. He claimed to have found element 87, now called francium, in pollucite and lepidolite. He also claimed to have found element 85, now called astatine, in monazite sand, a mineral which is rich in rare earth elements and thorium. He named the two elements after the American states Virginia and Alabama, virginium and alabamine. Wendell Mitchell Latimer claimed to have discovered tritium in 1933 using the same method.

After several years and several attempts to verify the claims of Allison, the method of magneto-optic spectroscopy was found to be unsuitable for the detection of the new elements. The Allison magneto-optic effect, or simply the Allison effect, was discussed by Irving Langmuir in his now famous 1953 lecture on pathological science.

== Life ==
Allison was born in Glade Spring, Virginia July 4, 1882 and earned a degree from Emory and Henry College in Emory, Virginia in 1904. After teaching at the same college, he decided to attend Johns Hopkins University Baltimore to get a degree in physics. After several years there (teaching at Emory and Henry and working on his Ph.D. in alternate years) he switched to the University of Virginia, and receiving his Ph.D. in physics in 1920 while working with Jesse Beams.

In 1922, Allison was invited to create the physics department of Alabama Polytechnic Institute, which later became Auburn University. As Dean of the Graduate school, he helped found the school's first Ph.D. programs. He stayed at the Polytechnic Institute for 31 years, until mandatory retirement. He then returned to Emory and Henry College as chair of the science division for three years. This was followed by teaching physics at Huntingdon College from 1956 to 1968. After this last lecturing position, he returned in 1969 to Auburn University and continued his lab work until one month before his death on August 2, 1974.

In the 1960s, Auburn University constructed the Allison Laboratory Building, which housed the University's physics department until May 2019, when the department was moved into the newly-expanded Leach Science Center. Earlier in 2019, the Auburn University Board of Trustees had voted to demolish both the Allison Laboratory Building and Parker Hall, the headquarters of the University's mathematics department, in order to clear space for the construction of a two-story, 151,000-square-foot academic space known as the Academic Classroom and Laboratory Complex (ACLC) and a three-story, 48,000-square-foot campus dining hall. The Allison Laboratory Building was fully demolished by early 2021, while, for currently unknown reasons, construction plans were amended to allow Parker Hall to remain standing.

== See also ==
- William Vann Parker
- Charles Richard Saunders
- History of Auburn University
