= Robert E. Bailey =

United States Air Force general

Robert E. Bailey is a brigadier general in the United States Air Force Reserve Command.

== Education ==
- Auburn University
- Squadron Officer School
- Air Command and Staff College
- Air War College

== Career ==
Bailey joined the United States Air Force in 1975. In 1976, he was assigned to the 96th Bombardment Wing. He would then be assigned to the 919th Special Operations Group.

After transferring to the Reserve Command, Bailey was assigned to the 96th Tactical Airlift Squadron at Minneapolis-Saint Paul International Airport in Hennepin County, Minnesota. Following a tour of duty with the Fourth Air Force, he was assigned to O'Hare Air Reserve Station north of Chicago, Illinois. From there, he became a special assistant to the commander of the 440th Airlift Wing at General Mitchell International Airport in Milwaukee, Wisconsin.

In 1999, Bailey was named Assistant Vice Commander of the Twenty-Second Air Force. He then became Inspector General at Headquarters Air Force Reserve Command. In 2005, he became Director of Installations and Military Support at Headquarters Air Force Reserve Command.

== Awards and honors ==
Awards he has received include the Legion of Merit, the Meritorious Service Medal with two oak leaf clusters, the Air Force Commendation Medal with oak leaf cluster and the Armed Forces Reserve Medal.

== See also ==
- List of Auburn University people
