= Raymond J. Harbert =

American business executive (born 1958)

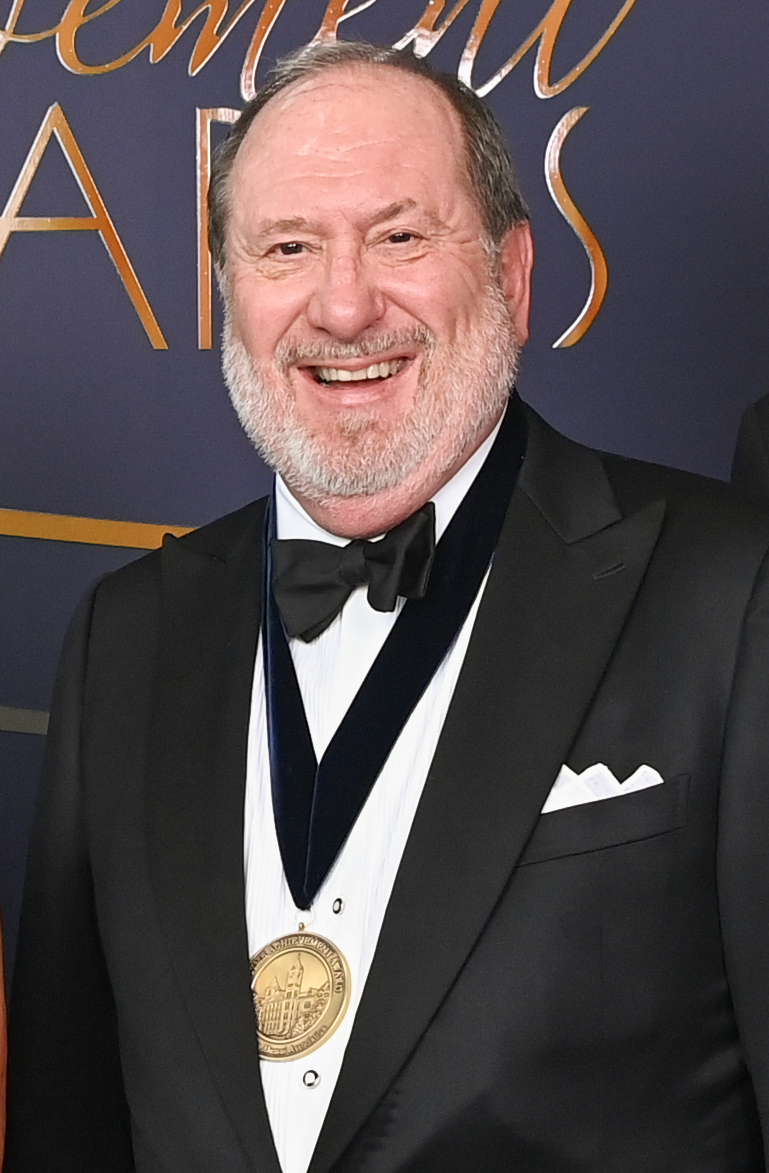
- Harbert in 2025
- Born: Raymond Jones Harbert; December 1958 (age 67–68); Birmingham, Alabama, U.S.
- Education: Auburn University
- Occupations: Investor, philanthropist
- Employer: Harbert Management Corporation
- Title: Chairman and CEO
- Spouse: Kathryn Dunn
- Children: 3
- Parent(s): John M. Harbert; Marguerite Harbert
- Relatives: Bill L. Harbert (paternal uncle)

Raymond Jones Harbert (born December 1958) is an American business executive, investor and philanthropist from Alabama. He is the founder, chairman and chief executive officer of Harbert Management Corporation (HMC), a global private investment firm with approximately US$8 billion of assets under management. Harbert has served on the board of trustees at Auburn University and became the namesake of the university’s Raymond J. Harbert College of Business following a $40 million dollar donation in 2013. Harbert is a member of the American Enterprise Institute's board of trustees.

== Early life ==
Raymond Jones Harbert was born in December 1958 and grew up in Birmingham, Alabama. His father, John M. Harbert, founded Harbert Corporation, a large multinational construction company, in 1949. His mother, Marguerite Harbert, was a billionaire philanthropist. He has a brother, John M. Harbert IV, and a sister, Marguerite H. Gray.

Harbert graduated from Auburn University, where he received a Bachelor of Science in industrial management in 1982.

== Career ==
Harbert was appointed as vice president of business development at Harbert International, a subsidiary of his father's company, Harbert Corporation, in 1982. Later, he was appointed as the president of its real estate subsidiary, Harbert Properties Corporation. From 1988 to 1990, he served as the vice president of Harbert Corporation, with responsibility for all investment activities. In 1990, he was elected as its chief executive officer, taking over all executive responsibilities from his father.

In 1993, Harbert borrowed US$3 million from his inheritance and founded Harbert Management Corporation, a global investment management firm headquartered in Birmingham. Over the next 20 years, HMC expanded and grew, opening offices around the US and Europe. The firm manages money for a wide variety of clients ranging from public endowments and foundations to high net worth individuals and family offices. HMC invests in real estate, energy, private equity and debt, venture capital, and the public markets.

In 2000, Harbert launched what became Harbinger Capital Partners, a hedge fund managed by Philip Falcone. After a strong 10-year run under the HMC umbrella, Falcone became the majority owner of Harbinger, though Harbert remained a personal investor.

In 2006, Harbert was sued by his sister Marguerite under the suspicion that he had failed to fulfil his fiduciary duties to the other shareholders of the Harbert Corporation, including his other brother and herself. Gray's claims differ from Harbert's claims.

== Philanthropy ==
Harbert serves on the board of trustees of his alma mater, Auburn University. In 2013, he pledged a US$40 million donation to its College of Business. Harbert donated US$25 million and agreed to donate US$15 million more should the university fundraise US$15 million on top of its donations. As a result, the board of trustees renamed it the Raymond J. Harbert College of Business. The donation helped fund professorial chairs, a doctoral program in finance, and the establishment of the Harbert Investments Center, a research center within the business school in conjunction with the Samuel Ginn College of Engineering. It was the largest charitable contribution ever made to Auburn University. The contribution has been credited with fueling rapid growth for the Harbert College of Business, nearly doubling it's enrollment in 10 years and surpassing the Samuel Ginn College of Engineering as the largest college at the university.

Harbert served on the board of directors of the Alabama Trust Fund. He also served on the Liberal Arts Advisory Council of Wake Forest University. He now serves on the board of trustees of Children's of Alabama, a children's hospital in Birmingham. He also serves on the executive committee of the Birmingham Business Alliance.

== Personal life ==
Harbert is married to Kathryn Dunn Harbert and they have three children. They reside in Mountain Brook, Alabama, a suburb of Birmingham. Harbert also owns a 10,000-acre farm in South Alabama, where he hunts quail and turkey.
