= The Sandy and John Black Pavilion at Ole Miss =

Multi-purpose arena in University, Mississippi

- SJB Pavilion
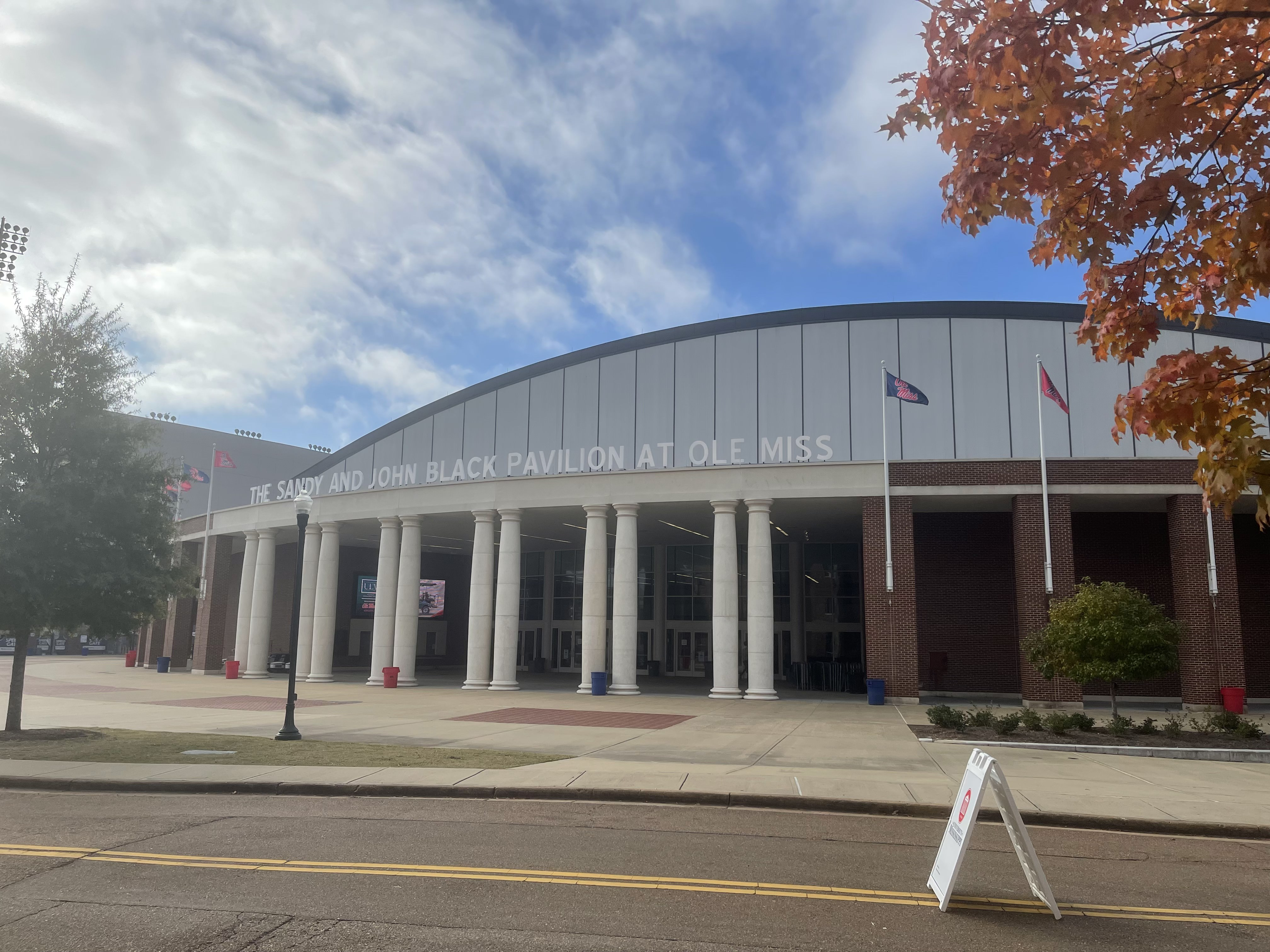
- North side facing All American Drive
- Interactive map of The Sandy and John Black Pavilion at Ole Miss
- Former names: The Pavilion at Ole Miss (2016–2021)
- Location: University, MS 38677
- Coordinates: 34°21′47.39″N 89°32′7.63″W
- Owner: University of Mississippi
- Operator: University of Mississippi
- Capacity: 9,500
- Surface: Hardwood

Construction
- Groundbreaking: July 31, 2014
- Opened: January 7, 2016
- Architect: AECOM
- General contractor: B.L. Harbert International

Tenants
- Ole Miss Rebels (Men's and women's basketball) (2016-present)

The Sandy and John Black Pavilion at Ole Miss, also known as the SJB Pavilion, is a multi-purpose arena on the campus of the University of Mississippi in University, Mississippi, a census-designated place surrounded by Oxford, Mississippi. The $96.5 million multipurpose arena is home to the University of Mississippi Rebels men's and women's basketball teams, with seating for up to 9,500 people. It is the largest on-campus basketball arena in the state of Mississippi. The facility also serves as a secondary student union, with a Steak 'N Shake and a Raising Cane's restaurant available to the community during normal business hours. The Pavilion replaced the Tad Smith Coliseum in January 2016; the opening game, on January 7, saw the Rebels men defeat Alabama 74–66.

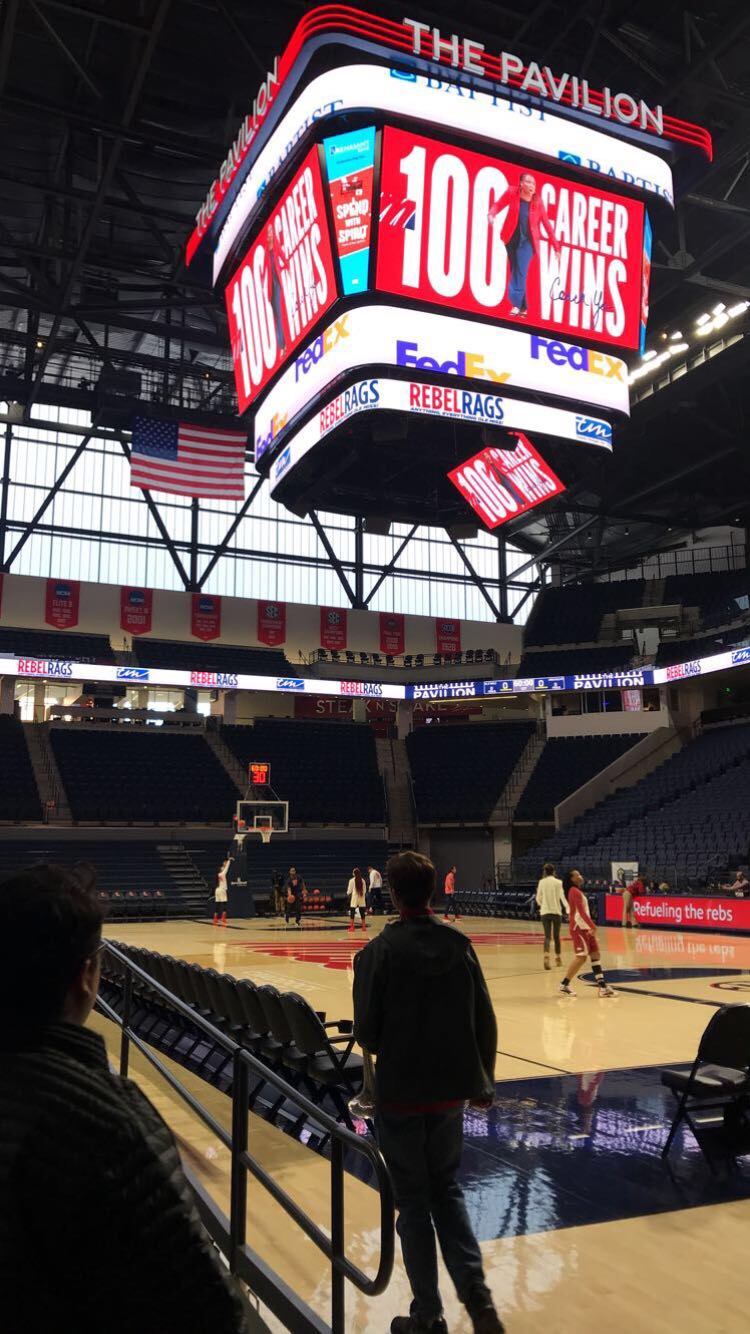
Inside view of the Pavilion

== Attendance record ==
All attendance records set have been at men's basketball games.

Attendance	Opponent	Season	Result
10,630	Mississippi State	2023–2024	W, 86–82
10,008	#13 Texas A&M	2024–2025	L, 62–63
9,631	#16 Auburn	2023–2024	L, 77–91
9,500	#6 Kentucky	2018–2019	L, 76–80
9,500	#7 Tennessee	2018–2019	L, 71–73
9,500	#22 Mississippi State	2018–2019	L, 75–81
9,500	Arkansas	2018–2019	W, 84–67
9,500	LSU	2018–2019	L, 69–83
9,500	Alabama	2015–2016	W, 74–66
9,500	Vanderbilt	2015–2016	W, 85–78
9,500	Arkansas	2015–2016	W, 76–60
9,500	Mississippi State	2015–2016	W, 86–78

== Non-athletic events ==
=== Concerts ===
- Brad Paisley
- Cam
- Wiz Khalifa

=== Political events ===
On October 29, 2025, The Pavilion hosted a Turning Point USA rally, headlined by Vice President of the United States JD Vance and Erika Kirk, CEO of TPUSA and widow of conservative political activist Charlie Kirk. Roughly 10,000 people were in attendance.

== See also ==
- List of NCAA Division I basketball arenas
