= Herbert W. Ehrgott =

United States Air Force general

- At West Point in 1926
- Born: October 31, 1904; Milwaukee, Wisconsin
- Died: September 20, 1982 (aged 77); Washington, D.C.
- Burial place: Arlington National Cemetery
- Military career
- Allegiance: United States of America
- Branch: United States Air Force
- Rank: Brigadier general

Herbert William Ehrgott (October 31, 1904 – September 20, 1982) was a brigadier general in the United States Air Force.

== Biography ==
Herbert William Ehrgott was born in Milwaukee, Wisconsin, on October 31, 1904. He would attend the Massachusetts Institute of Technology.

Ehrgott died in Washington, D.C., on September 20, 1982, and was buried at Arlington National Cemetery.

== Career ==
Ehrgott graduated from the United States Military Academy in 1926. In 1934 he became Professor of Military Science and Tactics at Alabama Polytechnic Institute. During World War II he served with the Ninth Air Force. Later he would work in atomic energy. His retirement was effective as of July 1, 1966.

Awards he received include the Legion of Merit, the Bronze Star Medal, the Croix de Guerre of France, and the Luxembourg War Cross. Ehrgott was also a Member of the Order of the British Empire.
