= Rheta Grimsley Johnson =

American journalist

- Born: 1953 (age 72–73)
- Education: Auburn University

Rheta Grimsley Johnson (born 1953) is an American reporter and columnist for King Features Syndicate of New York. Johnson travels the country in search of stories, frequently reporting from her native South, with datelines from Washington, D.C., to Iuka, Mississippi.

== Education, career and awards ==
Johnson is a 1977 graduate of Auburn University and winner of the 1974-75 National Pacemaker Award while on the staff of The Auburn Plainsman.

From 1980 until 1994, when she joined the Atlanta Journal-Constitution, she was a reporter and columnist for The Commercial Appeal in Memphis, Tennessee, and Scripps Howard News Service. She worked for the AJC for seven years. She has earned numerous awards for her writing, including the National Headliner Award for commentary in 1985 and Scripps Howard's Ernie Pyle Memorial Award for outstanding human interest reporting in 1984. In 2010 she received the Clarence Cason Award in Nonfiction Writing from the University of Alabama's journalism department.

She was Scripps Howard Writer of the Year from 1983 to 1985. And in 1991, she was one of three finalists for the Pulitzer Prize for Commentary.

In 1989 she wrote Good Grief, the authorized biography of Charles Schulz. In 2008 she published the book Poor Man's Provence: Finding Myself in Cajun Louisiana.

== Personal life ==
She was formerly married to Jimmy Johnson, creator of the Arlo and Janis comic strip that appears in many U.S. newspapers. The two remain close friends.

== Bibliography ==
- Grimsley Johnson, Rheta (1989), Good Grief: The Story of Charles M. Schulz, New York: Pharos Books, ISBN 0-88687-553-6
- Hunter James and Rheta Grimsley Johnson, They Didn't Put That on the Huntley-Brinkley!: A Vagabond Reporter Encounters the New South, University of Georgia Press, February, 1993, hardcover, ISBN 0-8203-1468-4
- Grimsley Johnson, Rheta (2008), Poor Man's Provence: Finding Myself in Cajun Louisiana, Montgomery, AL: NewSouth Books, ISBN 9781588382184
- Grimsley Johnson, Rheta (2010), Enchanted Evening Barbie and the Second Coming: A Memoir, Montgomery, AL: NewSouth Books, ISBN 9781588382504
- Grimsley Johnson, Rheta (2012), Hank Hung the Moon ... and Warmed Our Cold, Cold Hearts, Montgomery, AL: NewSouth Books, ISBN 9781588382849
- Grimsley Johnson, Rheta (2016), The Dogs Buried Over The Bridge: A Memoir in Dog Years, Winston-Salem, NC: John F. Blair, ISBN 9780895876652
