= Joseph Majdalani =

Lebanese-American professor

- Born: Lebanon
- Education: University of Utah
- Occupations: Researcher and professor
- Title: Hugh and Loeda Francis Chair of Excellence in Aerospace Engineering
- Scientific career
- Workplaces: Auburn University
- Website: Official website

Joseph Majdalani is a Lebanese-American professor of Mechanical and Aerospace Engineering. He began his career at Marquette University, before serving as both the Jack D. Whitfield Professor of High Speed Flows and Arnold Chair of Excellence at the University of Tennessee Space Institute. He then served as the Auburn Alumni Engineering Council Endowed Professor and Chair, and is currently the Hugh and Loeda Francis Chair of Excellence in Aerospace Engineering at Auburn University.

== Early life ==
Starting in 1991 Majdalani began working as an engineering consultant for companies in the technological, industrial, and design industries. Majdalani received his graduate education from the University of Utah, receiving a Master of Science in 1991 and Ph.D. in Mechanical Engineering in 1995. While at the University of Utah his major advisor was Professor William K. Van Moorhem.

== Teaching ==
His first faculty position was at Marquette University, where he received tenure. He was also awarded two outstanding teaching awards, as well as grants from the National Science Foundation and NASA. In 2002 he received the National Science Foundation CAREER Award in the acoustics, mechanical systems, and controls division.

In 2003 Majdalani joined the Mechanical, Aerospace, and Biomedical Engineering faculty at the University of Tennessee Space Institute. He started as the Jack D. Whitfield Professor of High Speed Flows, and in 2007 became the Arnold Chair of Excellence. As a professor there, he was awarded the 2007 Ralph R. Teetor Educational Award from the Society of Automotive Engineers as well as the 2012 Abe M. Zarem Educator Award from the American Institute of Aeronautics and Astronautics (AIAA).

In 2006 Majdalani became a Fellow of the American Society of Mechanical Engineers. He also served as the vice-chair and then chair for the Hybrid Rockets Technical Committee of the American Institute of Aeronautics and Astronautics from 2013 to 2017. That year he transitioned to chair the Solid Rockets Technical Committee. He also served from 2016 to 2018 as the Honors & Awards Director for the AIAA Greater Huntsville Section. Majdalani also served on the External Advisory Board of the Center for Simulation of Advanced Rockets, University of Illinois, Urbana-Champaign.

In 2013 he was named the Auburn Alumni Engineering Council Endowed Professor and Chair of Aerospace Engineering at Auburn University. He held this title until 2016, and then transitioned to the Hugh and Loeda Francis Chair of Excellence in Aerospace Engineering. As a part of this appointment, he has travelled internationally to recruit foreign students with diverse cultures and ethnic backgrounds through the Auburn Global initiative.

At Auburn University, Majdalani served as Faculty Advisor for the AIAA Student Branch and received the 2014 Konrad Dannenberg Educator of the Year Award as well as the 2015 Faculty Advisor and the 2016 Sustained Service Awards from the AIAA Foundation.

== Research ==
Majdalani's work focuses on the theoretical and computational modeling of solid, liquid and hybrid rockets. His investigations have explored rocket internal ballistics, vorticity dynamics, rotating cyclonic flows, computational mathematics, and singular perturbation theory. For example, his work uncovered new Trkalian and Beltramian helical flows within cyclonic hybrid and liquid rocket engines. Majdalani also developed a generalized-scaling technique in perturbation theory for use in wave propagation. Both have been used in frameworks for modeling combustion instability in rocket systems.

Majdalani has also developed a mathematical framework to model high speed flow problems through his work on compressible gas motions, including work published in the Proceedings of the Royal Society and Journal of Fluid Mechanics. Eighteen new dimensionless parameters have been discovered through his work. In all Majdalani has produced about 260 publications. Among his research projects he has maintained collaborations with other professors as well as students, including researchers from ORBITEC, the University of Utah, Pennsylvania State University, the University of Tennessee, Chattanooga, and the Arnold Engineering Development Complex. His research contributions have been recognized through the 2005 and 2015 Solid Rockets Best Paper Awards from the American Institute of Aeronautics and Astronautics.
