= Sophia Bracy Harris =

American child care advocate

Sophia Bracy Harris is an American child care advocate. She co-founded the Federation of Child Care Centers of Alabama (FOCAL). She was awarded the John D. and Catherine T. MacArthur "Genius" Award in 1991, the Rockefeller Public Service Award, and Gleitsman Foundation "People who Make a Difference". She was among the first Black students to attend Wetumpka High School under a Freedom of Choice plan.

== Terror attacks ==
When only a young girl her family home was firebombed in response to her attempts to attend school. On January 1, 1966, at around 1 a.m., homemade fire bombs were thrown at her house. They hit three different sides of the house. The flames blocked all but one exit. Despite the fact that 11 people had been inside, nine of whom had been sleeping, all escaped alive. The house was burned to the ground.

== Activism work ==
Harris was one of the founders of Federation of Child Care Centers of Alabama (FOCAL), now known as the Federation of Community-Controlled Centers of Alabama. This organization worked to help organize child care centers in rural Alabama and ensure compliance with new licensing laws that were being inconsistently applied. FOCAL also worked to defeat a 1974 bill that would have required child care providers to take college courses and would have been logistically challenging for many of the rural child care providers the group organized and represented.

In 1984, Harris organized the Black Women's Leadership and Economic Development Project to help support black women's self-sufficiency and provide leadership training.
