= History of Auburn University =

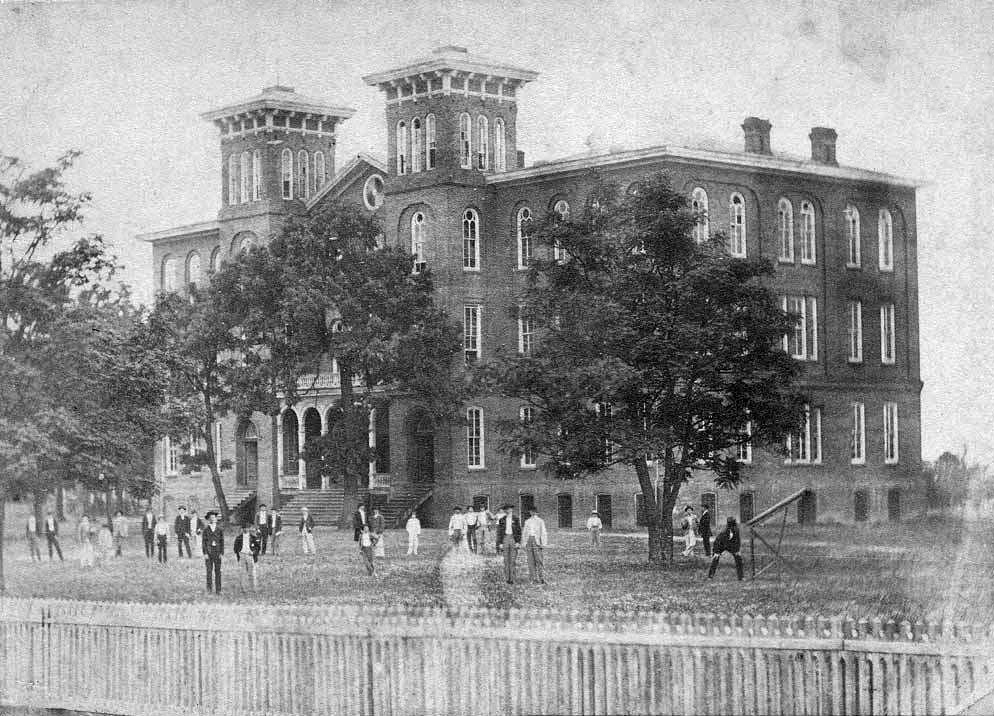
"Old Main," the first building on Auburn's campus, was destroyed by fire in 1887.

Auburn University (AU or Auburn) is a public university located in Auburn, Alabama, United States. With more than 25,000 students and 1,200 faculty members, it is one of the largest universities in the state.

== Origins ==
The Institute was chartered by the Alabama Legislature on February 1, 1856, as the East Alabama Male College, a private liberal arts school under the guidance of the Methodist Church.

The first president of the institution was Reverend William J. Sasnett. The school opened in 1859 to a student body of eighty and a faculty of ten. Classes were held in "Old Main" until the college was closed due to the American Civil War, when most of the students and faculty left to enlist. The campus was used as a training ground for the Confederate Army, and "Old Main" served as a hospital for Confederate wounded.

To commemorate Auburn's contribution to the Civil War, a cannon lathe used for the manufacture of cannons for the Confederate Army and recovered from Selma, Alabama, was presented to Auburn in 1952 by brothers of Delta chapter of the Alpha Phi Omega fraternity. It sits today on the lawn next to Samford Hall.

== Post-Civil War ==
The school was reopened in 1866 following the end of the Civil War and has operated ever since. In 1872, control of the institution was transferred from the Methodist Church to the State of Alabama for financial reasons. The Reconstruction-era state government placed the school under the provisions of the Morrill Act as a land-grant institution, the first in the South to be established separate from the "state" university. This act provided for 240,000 acres (971 km²) of Federal land to be sold in order to provide funds for an agricultural and mechanical school. As a result, in 1872 the school was renamed Agricultural and Mechanical College of Alabama.

Under the provisions of this act, land-grant institutions were also supposed to teach military tactics and train officers for the United States military. In the late 19th century, most students at the Agricultural and Mechanical College of Alabama were enrolled in the cadet program, learning military tactics and training to become future officers. Each county in the state was allowed to nominate two cadets to attend the college free of charge.

In 1892, two historic events occurred: women were first admitted to the Agricultural and Mechanical College of Alabama, and football was first played by young men as a school sport. Eventually, football replaced polo as the main sport on campus. In 1899, the school name was changed to Alabama Polytechnic Institute.

== World War I and II periods ==
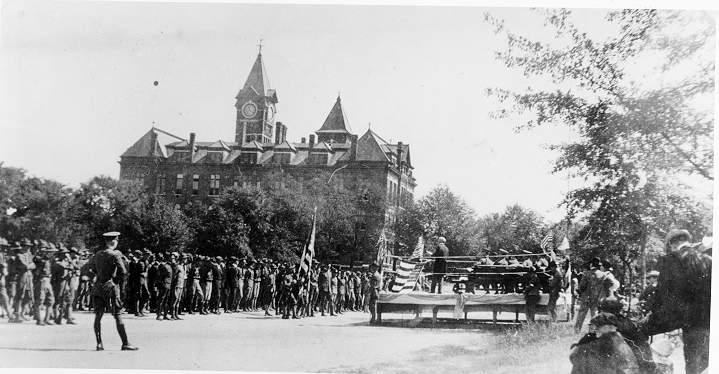
API Cadets drill on Ross Square in 1918.

On October 1, 1918, nearly all of Alabama Polytechnic Institute's able-bodied male students 18 or older voluntarily joined the United States Army when the United States entered the war. They had short-lived military careers that were completed on campus because of the end of the war. The student-soldiers numbered 878, according to API President Charles Thach, and formed the academic section of the Student Army Training Corps. The vocational section was composed of enlisted men sent to API for training in radio and mechanics.

The students received honorable discharges two months later following the Armistice that ended World War I. API struggled through the Great Depression, having scrapped an extensive expansion program by then-President Bradford Knapp. Faculty salaries were cut drastically, and enrollment decreased, as did State appropriations to the college. By the end of the 1930s, API had essentially recovered, but then faced new conditions caused by World War II.

As war approached in 1940, the United States recognized that it had a great shortage of the engineers and scientists needed for the defense industries. The U.S. Office of Education asked all American engineering schools to join in a ‘crash’ program to produce what was often called ‘instant engineers.’ API became an early participant in an activity that eventually became Engineering, Science, and Management War Training (ESMWT). Fully funded by the government and coordinated by API's Dean of Engineering, college-level courses were given in concentrated, mainly evening classes at sites across Alabama. Taken by thousands of adults – including many women – these courses were highly beneficial in producing skilled individuals who filled the wartime ranks of civilian engineers, chemists, and other technical professionals. The ESMWT also benefited API by providing employment for faculty members when the student body was significantly diminished by the draft and patriotic volunteers.

During the war, API also trained U.S. military personnel on campus; between 1941 and 1945, API produced over 32,000 troops for the war effort.

== Post World War II to present ==
Following the end of World War II, API, like many colleges around the country, underwent a period of massive growth when returning veterans took advantage of their GI Bill offer to seek free education. In the five-year period following the end of the war, enrollment at API more than doubled.

Recognizing that the college had expanded programs, added graduate programs, and moved beyond its agricultural and mechanical roots, in 1960 the Alabama Legislature authorized it as a university. It was officially renamed as Auburn University, a name that better represented the varied academic programs and expanded curriculum that the school had been offering for years. In addition, the name was used unofficially since at least the 1930s when Jordan-Hare Stadium opened in 1939 as "Auburn Stadium."

Like most universities in the American South, Auburn was racially segregated by state law prior to 1963, with only white students being admitted. In 1964, Harold Franklin became the first African-American student to be admitted to Auburn University after the passage of the Civil Rights Law that prohibited segregation in public facilities. Josetta Brittain Matthews was both the first African-American graduate and faculty member, earning a master’s degree in education in 1966 and becoming a French and history instructor of the College of Liberal Arts in 1972. Josetta Brittain Matthews would later go on to the first African-American at Auburn to obtain a doctorate degree in 1975. In the 1980s, Chief Justice Harold Melton became the first African-American President of the Student Government Association.

Auburn has grown since its founding in 1856, as of Fall 2023 Auburn University has 33,015 students and 1,435 faculty at the main campus in Auburn.
