= Harbert College of Business =

Business school of Auburn University

Coordinates: 32.603374°N 85.486078°W

- Other name: Raymond J. Harbert College of Business
- Motto: Inspiring business
- Type: Public business school
- Established: 1967; 59 years ago
- Parent institution: Auburn University
- Dean: Jennifer Mueller-Phillips
- Undergraduates: 6,180
- Postgraduates: 977
- Location: Auburn, Alabama, United States
- Campus: Suburban
- Alumni: 55,000
- Website: harbert.auburn.edu

The Harbert College of Business (formally known as the Raymond J. Harbert College of Business) is the business school of Auburn University in Auburn, Alabama, United States.

Founded in 1967, the school grants both undergraduate and graduate degrees, and is one of the university's 12 constituent schools. Since 2013, the college has been named in honor of Auburn alumnus Raymond J. Harbert, who with his wife Kathryn, gave the college a US$40 million gift.

== History ==
=== Leadership and Milestones ===
- In 1967, O.D. “Jack” Turner was appointed the first dean of Auburn University's new School of Business, which was located in Thach and Tichenor Halls. During Turner's tenure, the teaching staff increased from 42 to 69, and the Business Advisory Council was established, which prepared the School of Business for entering the accreditation process.
- In 1973, George Horton became the second School of Business dean. A visionary leader, he served for 11 years and played a key role in creating the most rigorous business program in Alabama and guiding the program into national prominence. He encouraged the faculty's scholarly output, and he guided the School through the accreditation process with the Association to Advance Collegiate Schools of Business (AACSB). Horton left Auburn in 1984.
- The third dean, Charles, Kroncke, served for two years (1986-1988), during which time the School of Business became the College of Business, a Ph.D. program was established in Management, the faculty increased to 111 and student enrollment reached 3,600 students.
- In 1989, Danny Bellenger became the fourth dean of the College of Business. During his three year-tenure, he focused on expanding doctoral programs and establishing an annual giving program.
- C. Wayne Alderman served as the College of Business’ fifth dean from 1993 to 2000 and helped further the College's reputation and advancements, including the formation of the Executive MBA and Physician's Executive MBA programs.
- Paul Bobrowski served as the College's sixth dean from 2004 to 2010. By the end of his tenure, the college's MBA program ranks 35th nationally and 75th worldwide in a survey by Financial Times.
- Bill Hardgrave's tenure as dean saw incredible growth and transformation, including the establishment of the Office of Professional and Career Development—the first college-embedded career placement resource on Auburn University's campus; the establishment of the Master of Real Estate Development (MRED) program with Auburn's College of Architecture, Design and Construction; the launch of Ph.D. programs in Business Analytics and Finance; the opening of the nationally known RFID lab; the transformational $40 million gift from alumni Raymond and Kathryn Harbert and renaming of the College in Mr. Harbert's honor; and the announcement of a second major gift from Harbert to build a new business building for graduate programs—now known as Horton-Hardgrave Hall.
- In 2018, Annette Ranft became the eighth dean of the Harbert College of Business. During her three-year tenure, Harbert College had record applications and enrollment in undergraduate and graduate programs, launched a new supply chain management department, grew faculty in strategic areas by 25 percent, and opened the New Venture Accelerator in Auburn's Research Park.
- In 2024, Jennifer Mueller-Philips became the ninth dean of Harbert College. The former director of the School of Accountancy, she also served as associate dean for academic affairs, where she worked to advance campus-wide entrepreneurship initiatives, strengthen student recruitment and retention and expand the college's $1.5 million scholarship program. Currently, Mueller-Phillips holds the title of both dean and Wells Fargo Professor.

== Facilities ==
The Harbert College of Business is housed in Lowder Hall and Horton-Hardgrave Hall on Auburn University's campus.

Lowder Hall includes faculty offices, state-of-the-art instructional classrooms and labs, and administrative offices. The building was named for Edward and Catherine Lowder. Edward Lowder graduated from Auburn in 1932 and later became a Montgomery businessman. Their sons—Bobby, Jimmy and Tom—all graduated from the College of Business.

Horton-Hardgrave Hall (HHH), which opened in 2019, houses the Harbert College graduate programs and provides some instructional and event spaces. The 100,000-square-foot building is named for two former deans, George Horton (1973-1984) and Bill Hardgrave (2010-2017). The construction of Horton-Hardgrave Hall was made possible through donations, including a $15 million lead gift from 1982 business alumnus Raymond Harbert and wife, Kathryn, also an Auburn graduate.

In 2020, Auburn University opened the New Venture Accelerator, which supports the creation and expansion of business ventures. Current and aspiring business owners learn to conduct market analyses, identify investors and develop pitch strategies through the guidance of a team of Entrepreneurs-in-Residence. The New Venture Accelerator is jointly managed by Harbert College and the Auburn Research and Technology Foundation.

== Undergraduate Academics ==
For the 2024–2025 academic year, Harbert College of Business has 6,180 undergraduate students enrolled across nine programs: pre-business, marketing, supply chain management, management, information systems management, finance, accounting, business administration and business analytics.

By the time of graduation, 90% of students graduate with real-world experience. The average starting salary for a Harbert College of Business student is $61,381.

Annually, $1.65 million is awarded to Harbert College of Business students in scholarships.

== Graduate Programs ==
For the 2024–2025 academic year, Harbert College of Business has 977 students enrolled in Master's programs and Graduate Certificate programs. Harbert College of Business offers the following Master's programs: Online MBA, full-time MBA, Master of Real Estate Development, MS in Information Sciences, MS in Supply Chain Management, Master of Accountancy, Executive MBA, MS in Finance and Physician's Executive MBA.

== Ph.D. Programs ==
Harbert College offers doctoral programs in Finance, Supply Chain Management, Information Systems Management and Management.

There are more than 55,000 Harbert College alumni worldwide. In the 2024–2025 academic year, Harbert College's diverse student body has representation from 33 countries.

== Rankings ==
=== Harbert College of Business Undergraduate Rankings ===
Program	Ranking among public institutions
Supply Chain Management	#12
Business Analytics	#15
Management	#20

=== Harbert College of Business Graduate Rankings ===
Ranking (2024)	Ranked by:
#10 Online MBA Programs	Poets&Quants
#2 Best Online Master's in Finance Programs	Intelligent
#16 Best Executive MBA in USA for Public Institutions	Eduniversal
Top 25 North American Graduate Supply Chain Programs	Gartner

== Faculty Eminent Scholars ==
Harbert College of Business faculty conduct research that advances the academy; their academic engagement drives business thought and practice; and their commitment to the student experience shapes the next generation of business leaders. Among these faculty are seven eminent scholars:

- Brian Connelly, Luck Eminent Scholar: Management
- O.C. Ferrell, James T. Pursell, Sr. Eminent Scholar of Ethics: Marketing
- Jimmy, Hilliard, Harbert Eminent Scholar: Finance
- Dave Ketchen, Harbert Eminent Scholar: Management
- Franz Lohrke, Lowder Eminent Scholar: Entrepreneurship
- David Paradice, Harbert Eminent Scholar: Business Analytics
- Glenn Richey, Harbert Eminent Scholar: Supply Chain Management

== Notable alumni ==
- Donald J. Boudreaux (1986), economist
- Raymond J. Harbert (1982), founder, chairman and CEO of Harbert Management Corporation; trustee; namesake of the Raymond J. Harbert College of Business, Alabama Business Hall of Fame
- Don Logan (1966), former CEO of Time Inc.; former chairman of Time Warner Cable
- Mark Spencer (1999), president and CEO of Digium, creator of Asterisk PBX
- Mark Thornton (1989 Ph.D.), economist
- Jimmy Wales (1989), co-founder of Wikipedia
- Chetan Sankar, Emeritus professor of Management Information Systems
- Michael S. Rogers, United States Navy admiral and director of the National Security Agency
- Jack Driscoll (2019), NFL offensive tackle for the Philadelphia Eagles
- Harold Melton, Chief Justice of the Georgia Supreme Court
- Jeannie Leavitt (2002), United States Air Force general officer and first woman fighter pilot in the USAF
- Mohamed Mansour (1971), Egyptian billionaire chairman of Mansour Group
- Youssef Mansour (1972), Egyptian billionaire businessman, co-owner of Mansour Group
- Joe Hortiz (1998), General Manager of the Los Angeles Chargers NFL.

== See also ==
- List of United States business school rankings
- List of business schools in the United States
