= Wenxian Shen =

Chinese-American mathematician

- Education: Georgia Institute of Technology (PhD, 1992) Beijing University (MS, 1987) Zhejiang Normal University (BS, 1982)
- Scientific career
- Institutions: Auburn University
- Thesis: Stability and Bifurcation of Traveling Wave Solutions (1992)
- Academic advisors: Shui-Nee Chow
- Website: https://webhome.auburn.edu/~wenxish/

Wenxian Shen is a Chinese-American mathematician known for her work in topological dynamics, almost-periodicity, waves and other spatial patterns in dynamical systems. She is Don Logan Chair of Mathematics at Auburn University.

== Education ==
Shen graduated from Zhejiang Normal University in 1982, and earned a master's degree at Peking University in 1987. She completed a Ph.D. in mathematics at the Georgia Institute of Technology in 1992, with the dissertation Stability and Bifurcation of Traveling Wave Solutions supervised by Shui-Nee Chow.

== Books ==
Shen is the coauthor of two monographs, Almost Automorphic and Almost Periodic Dynamics in Skew-Product Semiflows (with Yingfei Yi, American Mathematical Society, 1998), and Spectral Theory for Random and Nonautonomous Parabolic Equations and Applications (with Janusz Mierczyński, CRC Press, 2008).
