= Kelly Kazek =

American author and columnist

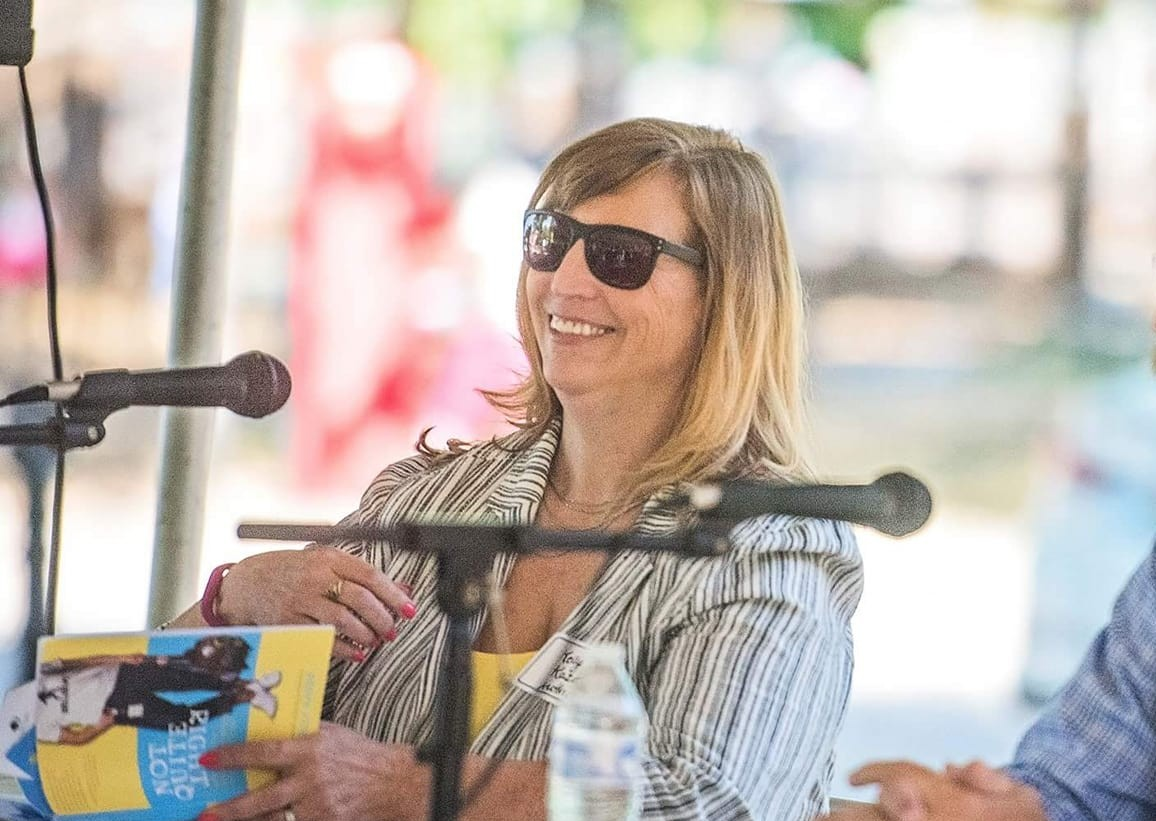
- Kazek, here at a 2015 festival, autographs one of her books for a fan.
- Born: February 9, 1965 (age 61); United States
- Education: Auburn University
- Occupations: Journalist, author
- Notable work: Some Nightmares Are Real, Fairly Odd Mother

Kelly Kazek (born February 9, 1965) is an American journalist and author. She is known for her humorous and historical writing focused on the American South, particularly Alabama. She has worked as a columnist and managing editor, and has published numerous books for both adults and children.

== Education ==
Kazek earned a bachelor's degree in English from Auburn University in 1987.

== Career ==
Kazek's writing often explores unusual people, events, stories, legends, and lore that, in her words, "make Alabama one of a kind." She writes witty and entertaining columns, with a conversational tone.

She served as managing editor of The News Courier in Athens, Alabama, and has been a columnist for Alabama Media Group, contributing to publications including The Huntsville Times, The Birmingham News, and Mobile Press-Register.

She is a regular contributor to It’s a Southern Thing, where she writes about Southern culture and traditions.

Kazek began publishing books at age 44. Her first was a collection of humorous newspaper columns titled Fairly Odd Mother: Musings of a Slightly Off Southern Mom.

== Honors and awards ==
Kazek is a two-time recipient of the Alabama Associated Press Media Editors Sweepstakes Award, which recognizes the best story in the state.

She was named Columnist of the Year in the CNHI Better Newspaper Contest, and won Best Humorous Commentary from the Green Eyeshade Awards in both 2007 and 2008.

In 2022, Kazek received first place in humorous commentary from the National Society of Newspaper Columnists.

She has twice served as president of the Alabama Associated Press Media Editors and sits on the advisory council of the Encyclopedia of Alabama.

== Selected works ==
- Some Nightmares Are Real: The Haunting Truth Behind Alabama’s Supernatural Tales (2024)
- Hidden History of Auburn (2011)
- Athens and Limestone County (2010)
- Southern Thesaurus: For When You’re Plumb Out of Things to Say (2022)
- Not Quite Right: Mostly True Tales of a Weird News Reporter (2018)
- Alabama Scoundrels: Outlaws, Pirates, Bandits & Bushwhackers (with Wil Elrick, 2014)
