= Arlo and Janis =

American comic strip by Jimmy Johnson

- Arlo and Janis
- Author: Jimmy Johnson
- Current status/schedule: Running
- Launch date: July 29, 1985
- Syndicate(s): Newspaper Enterprise Association
- Genre(s): Humor, Gag-a-day

Arlo and Janis is an American gag-a-day comic strip written and drawn by Jimmy Johnson. It is a leisurely paced domestic situation comedy. It was first published in newspapers on July 29, 1985.

== Cast ==
The focus of the strip is tightly on its two title characters, a middle-aged, middle-class baby boomer couple with an easygoing approach to life. The family surname is Day, but it is only rarely used in the strip. Johnson said, "When I first sold the strip, the family had no name. The strip itself had no name! Preparing to launch, the syndicate brain trust decided, 'Let's make their name Day and call the strip Day by Day.' However, it turned out there was an old, semi-defunct newspaper column called Day by Day, and legally timid heads prevailed. The strip was named Arlo and Janis. I subsequently kept the name ‘Day.’ Why not?" Johnson, surveying his core cast, compared Gene, Janis and Arlo to Larry, Moe and Curly, respectively, with the family cat, Ludwig, corresponding to Shemp.

- Arlo is Janis' husband. He works a corporation, which is poorly managed and has no clear purpose. He is drawn wearing a tie when at work, and at home he wears jeans and a plain T-shirt. His character is generally laid back and ironic. He is in his late 40s.
- Janis, nee Janis Colette, is Arlo's wife. Like him, she is shown to have an undefined corporate job. Especially in earlier strips, she was portrayed as insecure about her looks (despite Arlo's sincere compliments) and, due to that insecurity, prone to "petty jealousies." She worries about Arlo's health and about Gene growing up. Janis is sincere, straightforward, and works hard on her relationships.

The first on-panel appearance of Ludwig, then referred to only as "the cat".

- Gene (Eugene) is their son. Arlo and Janis were once frequently joined by their son, but as Gene slowly matured, his presence in the strip shrank dramatically. Having been approximately eight years old when the strip was introduced, he received his driver's license May 26, 2003. In August 2007 he is shown leaving home for college. Johnson maintained that Gene's diminished role in the strip was due to his wanting to show realistically the way that adolescents begin to lead their own lives. In time, Gene received more panel-time as his relationship with Mary Lou blossomed.
- Ludwig (Count Ludwig Von Steppenmaus III) the cat was first seen in the third panel of the daily published November 2, 1993, and later became a regular character. Except in fantasy sequences, Ludwig behaves like a real cat. One such sequence began with Ludwig suggesting to Arlo that "the role of the cat in this strip should be more anthropomorphic!" On Johnson's blog, at least, he is often referred to as "Luddie", and his fans are identified as "Luddites".
- Mary Lou is their daughter-in-law. She first appeared as a summer love whom young Gene met while on a family beach vacation in 1993. Johnson brought her back into the strip on several occasions in 1993 and 1994, including the summers after Gene's first three years of college (2008, 2009 and 2010). Johnson said that Mary Lou had taken on an importance second only to the three main characters and Ludwig, and that she and her family are about the only recurring characters outside the immediate family. In 2009, Mary Lou, an unwed mother from a previous relationship, became Gene's first mature love interest and in 2010 Gene offered Mary Lou his great-grandmother's ring. In September 2012 she became Gene's wife.
- Meg is Mary Lou's precocious daughter from an early relationship.
- Other cast members: Mary Lou's father Gus often appears. Other characters take part in storylines on occasion, some as established "guest stars", but no other characters appear regularly in the strip, and few ever recur at all.

== Content ==
Arlo and Janis strips are most often gag-a-day strips based on recurring themes, with only rarely any advancement of continuity. Readers may see themselves in Johnson's observations, and have written to his blog jokingly accusing Johnson of looking in their windows.

Occasionally, Johnson strings together a few daily gags that, taken together, amount to the exploration of a topic. Only rarely does he create arcs of daily strips that together take on all the traditional elements of a story.

Johnson wrote, "I’ve always enjoyed serial strips, but they change the nature of the product. Ultimately, I think I prefer the gag-a-day format, done well. The 'done well' part is crucial. Of course, they can't be hilarious every day."

"Sometimes when I get on a roll with an extended conversation within a sequence of strips", Johnson observed, "the whole can be viewed like a short comic book."

Expressing a preference for timely, topical humor when available, Johnson wrote, "Given the choice (if they are the only two) between drawing a pedestrian comic related to some current event, thereby given it a shiny new sheen... or doing another Arlo-isn’t-listening-to-Janis gag even if it might be funnier, I’ll choose the former." He went on to observe, nevertheless, that topical humor tends to not hold up well over time.

Johnson wrote that early on he experimented with short poems "when I wanted to do something a bit different or when I was stuck for a better idea." In time it occurred to him that the limerick format was inherently comical and "fit the four-panel format" of the comic strip. Since the time of that realization, the limerick has been an occasionally recurring structure in the daily strip.

Some of his recurring themes for jokes and storylines are touched on below:

=== Physical attraction ===
An example of the frequently suggestive content that the strip features.

Many of the most notable jokes are based on sexual attraction, especially Arlo's desire for Janis. Despite having been a couple since meeting in college in 1973 (a backstory revealed in a series of strips that also functioned as a parody of the book and film Gone with the Wind), Arlo and Janis are still besotted with each other, an unusual portrayal in a medium where long marriages are often presented as either sexless or antagonistic.

"There has always been knowledge of sex in Arlo and Janis, and the fact that married people have sex," Johnson said. "I think it's silly to ignore that humans have sex. It's like ignoring eating and sleeping." Johnson also wrote, "I'd be willing to bet you five dollars I was the first cartoonist to depict a couple exchanging sexual fantasies in bed."

On the "Comics I Don't Understand" website, "The Arlo Award" is given to a cartoonist who slips something past the syndicate censors.

Janis's negative body image has been a popular topic over the years. She sees herself as at least a little overweight, and unworthy of wearing a two-piece swimsuit. Arlo, on the other hand, persistently tries to convince her to put on the bikini again.

=== Office humor ===
The early years of the strip regularly featured office humor. Johnson claims he was "doing office humor when Scott Adams worked for the phone company," but he used the theme less frequently over time. Johnson has attributed that decline to two factors. First, his memories of own his experiences in an office setting began to fade as he became ensconced in his cartooning, leaving him "neither inclined nor qualified to comment on 'the office.'" Second, he feels that with the concept of traditional "careers" falling by the wayside, his middle-aged title characters would tend to center their lives around relationships and home. Seldom were jobs even mentioned as time passed, and by 2017, Johnson felt he needed to address the suspicion of readers that Arlo and Janis were retired. While proclaiming they retained their usual undefined jobs, Johnson allowed that Arlo and Janis were in "that winding-down phase of employment."

=== Battle of the sexes and species, and generations ===
Stereotypical gender differences between Arlo and Janis provide a lot of the strip's content. For example, Janis often accuses Arlo of not listening to her, and he pretends that he does. Arlo watches football and Janis complains about it.

Arlo's envy of the cat Ludwig's idyllic lifestyle, sometimes veiled as criticism, fuels many strips. "I make it a rule to draw one cat cartoon a week," Johnson writes. "I draw a cat cartoon every fifth or sixth Sunday. Other than that, I don't plan it. Sometimes, a cat cartoon will run late in the week, then on Sunday, then again early the next week. Inevitably, I will get mail of the ilk, 'I hate your stupid cat cartoons! That's all you do anymore! Why don't you throw yourself under a bus, you loser!' If I were a cat, I'd steer clear of those types." Johnson's readers submit many stories of cute cats to his blog.

Johnson also treats Arlo's envy of Gene's youth and freedom, and Arlo's ironic and sympathetic observation of Gene's unawareness of how much lies ahead. Janis is shown worrying that Gene is growing up—and away—before she is ready and she struggles to hold onto him.

=== Politics and history ===
The strip often includes political viewpoints. In particular, Arlo regularly rants about the damaging influence of large corporations on American society. One lengthy storyline examined American and Cuban relations. Another related the World War II experience of Arlo's father.

=== Modern life ===
Arlo and Janis humorously criticizes the pace, direction, and quality of modern American life. Arlo feels trapped on a "treadmill" and has questioned the wisdom of the entire disposable consumer economy on multiple occasions. In the strip on Sunday, November 30, 2008, this idea was reiterated by Janis: "You said we buy things we don't need with money we don't have." Arlo counters with, "But the people who sell us the things we don't need depend on the money we don't have." In August 2009, Arlo has gone up a tree to escape "the absurdity of modern living," but he soon pines for a Kindle.

So-called conveniences like cable television and cellular phones are examined. For example, the miniaturization of data storage devices is both trumpeted and lampooned in the November 3, 2007, daily, with Janis unable to find the tiny disk that conveniently holds all her photographs. The loss of privacy that has come with the internet is also mourned: "I still think it's creepy to go to a book or music web site and have it make suggestions of 'other titles you might enjoy,'" admits Johnson.

=== Surrealism, fantasy and metaphor ===
There are regular detours from "reality". In one case, Arlo "called in sick" to the strip and was replaced by a large, realistically drawn alligator for a week. Janis imagined a large dust-bunny named Harvey in another sequence, representing her feelings of house-keeping inadequacy. Janis has shared her fantasy of being a torch singer and Arlo has periodically "sailed away" from his mundane existence in extended daydreams. The courtship of a mermaid by a fisherman and a fable of the grasshopper and the ant were both played out by the Arlo and Janis characters. The fourth wall is sometimes broken, and readers sometimes are shown behind the scenes, with the "actors" preparing for the strip. For example, as Daylight Saving Time ended on November 4, 2012, nothing is happening, and Arlo implies that the reader has come in too early due to the time change, and that the "comic strip doesn't begin for another hour."

=== Self-reference ===
There have been many meta-joke strips about the process of creating a daily comic strip, particularly about writer's block, with the character admitting (for the cartoonist) the absence of a joke or the reuse of a joke used before. Arlo's fondness for and the inclusion in the strip of the Mississippi-born singer/songwriter Jimmy Buffett reveal Johnson's musical taste, and his love of sailing mirrors Johnson's. Within the Sunday strip for January 1, 2012, Arlo affixes that same strip onto his freezer door, creating the infinity effect sometimes used on comic book covers, and also referencing that habit of comic strip readers to clip and post favorites.

In the July 19, 2018 daily strip, Johnson steps out into full view. He draws himself drinking coffee at the drawing board. A blank sheet of paper awaits an inspiration.

== Setting ==
It is not specified where Arlo and Janis live. In a 2008 strip, Johnson put their home a four-hour drive from the coast, but without specifying which coast.

Johnson wrote in his blog on January 2, 2014, "I remember not long after I started drawing Arlo & Janis, I made a reference to eating peas on New Year's Day, and my editor in New York City expressed concern that might be a 'southern' tradition, and we didn't want to give newspaper editors the idea A&J was a 'southern' strip. I guess she was afraid I'd start doing jokes about fatback and kissin' cousins."

Most of the action takes place in the home and the yard, both of which are portrayed with an economy of ink. In earlier years especially, a glimpse into the office environments of either Arlo or Janis might be given. There are occasional forays into the neighborhood, but few discernible landmarks are shown. The seashore is the favored vacation destination.

Especially after Gene's marriage, the strip's setting expanded to include Gene's family's home, their farm, and their farm stand and cafe.

== Origins of the characters' names ==
According to Johnson's ex-wife, the newspaper columnist Rheta Grimsley Johnson, the lead characters are named after 1960s music icons Arlo Guthrie and Janis Joplin, and their son after Eugene McCarthy. Jimmy Johnson has said that Arlo was inspired by a friend with curly hair who resembles Guthrie, and the name Janis was "a marketing device used to attract the baby boom generation." Some readers have suggested that the strip is autobiographical, because Janis and Rheta Grimsley Johnson are lookalikes, as are Johnson and Arlo. Rheta Grimsley Johnson confirms the physical resemblances, but states that the strip is not autobiographical, noting that they did not have any children, and that there is not a contrast between her personality and that of Johnson, unlike the personality differences in the strip between Arlo and Janis.

Johnson expanded on and clarified the origins story in a 2020 blog entry: "When I was in college, I did a comic strip for the weekly student newspaper. It was about a hapless hippie (Yes, that term was alive and well back then.) named 'Arlo.' Indirectly, the character was named for Arlo Guthrie. I say 'indirectly,' because I had a buddy named Pat whom we had nicknamed 'Arlo,' because he had a shocking mane of long curly hair, much like the singer. Basically, I just wanted to annoy him. Years later, when I was developing the comic strip Arlo & Janis, I resurrected the name 'Arlo' for my male lead, because I think it has a certain comic quality. 'What name,' I thought, 'would pair well with 'Arlo?' It didn’t take long to come up with 'Janis.'”

== Jimmy Johnson ==
Jimmy Johnson lives in the coastal city of Pass Christian, Mississippi. Although his own house was largely undamaged by Hurricane Katrina in August 2005, the devastation of his adopted hometown affected Johnson greatly; his blog at ArloAndJanis.com focused on little else for months afterward, and references to the hurricane appeared in the strip in the last third of 2005.

== Reprint volumes ==
There has been one paperback reprint volume titled Arlo and Janis: Bop 'Till You Drop. It was published by Pharos Books in February 1989. When offered for sale on Amazon.com, it is usually priced as a prized collectable.

Johnson made mention in his blog of wanting to publish a twentieth anniversary volume for 2005. In 2008, after repeated inquiries by posters to his blog, the idea was revived on April 1, but on March 3, 2011, Johnson announced in his blog that the book deal had fallen through. Finally in November 2011, Johnson self-published Beaucoup Arlo & Janis, a 256-page, hard-bound collection of over 900 carefully selected A&J comic strips with several introductory essays by the creator.
