= John M. Harbert =

American businessman (1921–1995)

- Born: John Murdoch Harbert III; July 19, 1921; Greenville, Mississippi, United States
- Died: March 31, 1995 (aged 73); Birmingham, Alabama, United States
- Occupations: Founder, chairman and chief executive officer
- Known for: Harbert Corporation
- Spouse: Marguerite Jones Harbert
- Children: 3

John Murdoch Harbert III (July 19, 1921 – March 31, 1995) was an American businessman. He is best known for building his international construction company, Harbert Corporation, into one of the world's largest, along with creating a personal wealth of well over $1.7 billion. Harbert lived with his wife Marguerite in the Birmingham, Alabama suburb of Mountain Brook.

John is also the older brother of late Birmingham businessman Bill L. Harbert, who was a co-founder of Harbert Corp. and who headed up the company's international operations. In 1993 Harbert Corp. sold its international construction division to Bill. Today the company's former international construction division is known as B.L. Harbert International and is run by Bill's son Billy.

== Life ==
Harbert served as a private in the U.S. Army in Europe during World War II. He received a degree in civil engineering from Auburn University in 1946. In 1949, he founded the Harbert Corporation. The company main business was its domestic and international construction unit, which at the time was one of the largest in the country. In the early 1990s the company sold its domestic construction operation. It also sold its international construction division around the same time to John's brother Bill L. Harbert, which today is known as B.L. Harbert International. Other company subsidiaries engaged in mining, pipeline development, land development, limestone quarrying, road construction. Harbert projects are numerous in Alabama, but the company had many projects in the Middle East as well. In metro Birmingham, Harbert's best known projects include the Elton B. Stephens Expressway (also called the Red Mountain Expressway, U.S. Highway 280), the Riverchase planned community, the accompanying Riverchase Galleria, the state's largest shopping center, and the Regions-Harbert Plaza.

A lengthy section of Interstate 459, the belt highway around the south side of metro Birmingham, is named for Harbert.

Harbert was a noted philanthropist, with numerous contributions to Auburn University and to Birmingham–Southern College, where a building bears his wife's name.

Harbert was married to the former Marguerite "Wita" Jones. The couple had three children, John Murdoch IV, Raymond, and Marguerite. John Harbert died on March 31, 1995. He was friends with T. Boone Pickens, and at one time was his business partner. His company continues to this day under the leadership of his son Raymond and operates under the name Harbert Management Corporation.

== Books ==
- John M. Harbert III: Marching to the Beat of a Different Drummer, (ISBN 0-9666546-0-9) by Leah Rawls Atkins, Tarva House, Birmingham, Alabama (1999)
