= Jean Garner Stead =

- Occupations: Management academic, author and consultant
- Awards: Choice Outstanding Academic Book Award; Faculty Excellence Awards for Teaching at ETSU

Academic background
- Education: BS., Business Administration; MA., Economics; MBA; PhD., Business Administration
- Alma mater: Auburn University; Western Illinois University; Louisiana State University
- Website: jeanstead.com

Jean Garner Stead is an American management academic, author and consultant. She is professor emerita of Management at East Tennessee State University.

Stead and her husband and colleague, Ed, are among the earliest pioneers in the field of management and sustainability, co-authoring the first book in the field in 1992 and developing the first course in the United States in 1990. Their book, Management for a Small Planet (1992) received the American Library Choice Outstanding Academic Book Award. In 2004, the Steads published Sustainable Strategic Management, the first book in the field to expand the strategic management process to include sustainability. Their research primarily focused on sustainable strategic management, ethical behavior, and management and spirituality. They were the recipient of their alma mater's, Auburn University, Spirit of Sustainability Award in 2017 for their research in sustainability. In addition, their research on ethical behavior received a Citation Classic Award from the Journal of Business Ethics in 2012.

== Education and early life ==
Stead graduated with a BS in business administration with a major in economics and continued her education at Auburn earning a MA in economics in 1973. In 1973, she became a Community Development Officer for the East Baton Rouge City Parish Government, where she worked to help those living in urban poverty.

Stead continued her academic career and moved to Western Illinois University, where she served as an instructor of economics for the next three years. Concurrently, she obtained her MBA degree and returned to LSU to study under economist Herman Daly while pursuing her PhD in business administration with a minor in ecological economics. After graduating in 1983, she moved to the Blue Ridge Mountains in Northeast Tennessee. She took a position in the Management and Marketing Department at East Tennessee University.

== Career ==
Stead spent her whole career at East Tennessee State University, joining the faculty as an assistant professor, and progressing to Full Professor in 1994. She retired in 2020 and was awarded professor emerita status.

Stead has also been professionally active in the Academy of Management. Along with her husband, she was a founding member of the Organizations and Natural Environment Interest Group (ONE) of the Academy of Management in 1994, and she was concurrently elected as the chairperson of the Greening Committee of the Social Issues Division in the Academy of Management.

== Community involvement ==
Stead has been involved in local organizations focused on social and environmental sustainability. She co-founded the Melting Pot Ministry within Munsey United Methodist Church in 1989. The ministry serves the urban poor and homeless offering programs like Our Daily Bread, Shepherd's Breakfast, and the Open Door worship service. It has maintained ties with the residents of the John Sevier Center, a low-income housing project. This close relationship initially formed on Christmas Eve in the same year during a tragic fire that killed several residents. She served as its chair until 2020 and engaged in establishing a collaborative relationship between the Johnson City Development Authority and the John Sevier Center residents in the search for new, affordable housing.

== Research ==
Stead has made contributions to sustainability and management research, with a focus on ethical behavior and the influence of spirituality on sustainability and strategic management. She co-authored the first books and developed the first course for environmental management in the United States in 1990.

Stead has co-authored 2 books with Ed Stead, focusing on sustainability and management for organizations. In the 1990s, her focus was on researching and authoring works regarding the contribution of business organizations to establishing a sustainable world marked by economic prosperity, social equity, and environmental harmony. In the book Management for a Small Planet, she emphasized the efficient and effective integration of environmental concerns into the management of business organizations. The book is the recipient of the American Library Association Choice Outstanding Academic Book Award, and American Economist and Professor Herman Daly remarked, "Ed and Jean Stead continue to enrich the management literature with a perspective that firmly roots the economy and its organizations within the constraints of the biophysical world."

Stead further explored strategic management issues and processes related to managing business organizations in sustainable ways in her book titled Sustainable Strategic Management. She and Ed addressed the aspects of the triple bottom line (economic, social, and environmental) in the development and execution of corporate, competitive, and functional-level strategies, examining eco and socio-efficient possibilities for companies operating within a closed-loop value chain and the role of eco and socio-effectiveness in the coevolution toward sustainable strategic management.

=== Cancer management in the workplace ===
In the early 1980s, alongside Ed, Stead explored the ethics of using cost-benefit analysis to set safe exposure levels for employees regarding cancer-causing substances in workplaces, resulting in publications in the Personnel Journal in 1980 and 1983. They analyzed OSHA's cancer prevention policy, explored high-risk cancer jobs, and proposed HR involvement, risk communication improvements, and in-house occupational health specialists to address the issue.

=== Ethical behavior management ===
In the late 1980s and early 1990s, Stead conducted research on the factors and processes that influence the ethical behaviors of employees. In a collaborative work with Ed Stead and Dan Worrell published in the Journal of Business Ethics, which was awarded a citation classic in 2012, she proposed a model for understanding ethical behavior in the context of business organizations, highlighting the importance of managerial involvement in espousing ethics, reinforcing ethical behavior, implementing screening mechanisms, providing ethical training, and establishing ethics units. Her joint research also showed that unethical choices are mainly influenced by past decision patterns and social-learning behaviors, with minor impacts from personality traits and demographics. She and her colleagues further conducted a laboratory experiment to investigate unethical behavior within business organizations and found that unethical decisions are influenced by reinforcement contingencies and, to some extent, by the stated managerial philosophy, highlighting the role of external reinforcement in unethical decision-making.

=== Sustainable strategic management ===
Stead researched the topic of sustainable strategic management, alongside Ed, in the late 1990s and 2000s. In a study published in the International Journal of Sustainable Strategic Management, she presented an enterprise-strategy-based model to guide organizations in integrating sustainability across various strategy levels. She also highlighted the role of business ecosystems in implementing sustainable strategies across various market types and the responsibilities of ecosystem leaders in shaping a sustainable future by reducing the human footprint and enhancing the quality of human life. In an article, coauthored with Ed and Lana Becker, that was awarded the Certificate of Merit in the Institute of Management Accountant's Lybrand Awards, she signified the need for accountability, transparency, accuracy, and completeness in sustainability reports for U.S. CPA firms to meet stakeholders' expectations.

Using Daly’s concept of a steady-state economy, Stead emphasized that fundamental shifts in scientific, economic, and management paradigms are necessary to alter the dominant myth of economic wealth and include the planet's well-being as an integral part of economic activity. She extended the concept of enterprise strategy to include ecological considerations and argued that this framework, termed "eco-enterprise strategy", can serve as a basis for ethically and strategically accounting for the Earth as a stakeholder. Moreover, she examined how business organizations in the United States respond to demands for improved environmental performance and determined that firms that effectively institutionalize better environmental performance can gain strategic advantages, while those that do not may face severe legal consequences.

=== Spirituality and sustainability ===
In the early 2010s, Stead, alongside Ed, studied the association between spirituality and sustainable management. She looked into the debate surrounding whether the earth should be considered a stakeholder in business organizations, where some argue that the earth's status as a stakeholder is based on its crucial role in economic survival, others question this perspective, emphasizing the ecological realities and the spiritual dimension of the Earth's stakeholder status. Additionally, she explored the resurgence of the Green Man archetype, symbolizing a deep connection with the earth, and its impact on business organizations. She noted that businesses are under increasing pressure to embrace sustainability and adopt values that prioritize nature, humanity, and future generations, leading to the accumulation of spiritual capital, the essential element in a shared, strategic vision. In related research, she emphasized the importance of organizations adopting triple bottom line strategies, including ecological, social, and economic aspects, and suggested that cultivating intangible spiritual capabilities like spiritual intelligence and spiritual capital is essential for sustainability to be successfully implemented into organizations' strategies, structures and processes.

== Awards and honors ==
- 1986, 1990, 1991 – Faculty Excellence Award, East Tennessee State University
- 1992 – Outstanding Academic Book Award, American Library Choice Magazine
- 1995 – University Faculty Excellence Award, East Tennessee State University
- 2015 – Faculty Emeritus Award, East Tennessee State University
- 2017 – Spirit of Sustainability Award, Auburn University
- 2018 – Student Choice Award, East Tennessee State University

== Bibliography ==
=== Books ===
- Management for a Small Planet (1992) ISBN 9780761902942
- Sustainable Strategic Management (2003) ISBN 9780765635457

=== Selected articles ===
- Stead, W. E., Worrell, D. L., & Stead, J. G. (1990). An integrative model for understanding and managing ethical behavior in business organizations. Journal of Business Ethics, 9, 233–242.
- Stead, W. E., & Stead, J. G. (1994). Can humankind change the economic myth? Paradigm shifts necessary for ecologically sustainable business. Journal of Organizational Change Management, 7(4), 15–31.
- Stead, J. G., & Stead, E. (2000). Eco-enterprise strategy: Standing for sustainability. Journal of business ethics, 24, 313–329.
- Stead, J. G., & Stead, W. E. (2008). Sustainable strategic management: an evolutionary perspective. International Journal of Sustainable Strategic Management, 1(1), 62–81.
- Stead, J. G., & Stead, W. E. (2014). Building spiritual capabilities to sustain sustainability-based competitive advantages. Journal of Management, Spirituality & Religion, 11(2), 143–158.
