= Jeffrey S. Harper =

- Born: November 27, 1956 (age 69); Huntsville, Alabama
- Occupation: Educator

Jeffrey S. Harper (born 1956) is an educator and author specializing in information systems and resource management. He was executive director of graduate programs in the Scott College of Business at Indiana State University in Terre Haute, Indiana. Harper was also CEO of 4140 Publications, which published Terre Haute Business Leader monthly.

Harper earned an associate degree in business administration from Calhoun Community College in 1987 and completed his bachelor's degree in accounting from Athens State College in 1989. In 1993, he earned his master's degree in management from The University of Alabama in Huntsville. Harper then studied under social scientist R. Kelly Rainer at Auburn University, earning his Ph.D. in management information systems in 1998.

== Professional career ==
Harper began teaching as assistant professor at his alma mater Athens State College in 1994. During this time he served as track chair and competition judge with the Decision Sciences Institute. After earning his doctorate, he accepted a position at Indiana State University at the Scott College of Business. He went on to found the university's ProMBA program and play instrumental roles in several student entrepreneurship initiatives.

He is known for his work in MIS teaching methods and technology. In 2008 he taught an e-commerce course for Harvard University as guest lecturer. As a consultant, Harper has worked with numerous organizations such as NASA, the United States Navy, and the United States Justice Department.

== Works ==
- Analysis and Classification of the Problem Definition Concept in Technology Transfer, 1998

Journal articles

- The Determinates of a Community Bank’s Profitability. Academy of Banking Studies Journal, 2013
- Assurance of Learning in the MIS Program. Decision Sciences Journal of Innovative Education, 2009 (July)
- The Use of a Single-Point Estimator to Establish Punitive Fines in a Compliance Audit: A Cautionary Note. Journal of Business and Economics Research, 2009 (January)
- Effective Use of Case Studies in the MIS Capstone Course through Semi-Formal Collaborative Teaching. Journal of Information Systems Education, 2008 (Winter)
- A Model for Assessing Students and Curriculum in an MIS Program. Review of Business Information Systems, 2003 (Fall)
- A Framework for the Model Student IS Organization. Journal of Informatics Education and Research, 2001
- Development of a Method for Analysis and Classification of Problem Statements in Technology Transfer. Journal of Science, Mathematics, Engineering, and Technology Education: Innovation and Research, 2000 (September - December)
- Analysis and Classification of Problem Statements in Technology Transfer. Journal of Technology Transfer, 1999 (June)
- A Needs Assessment Model for Telecommunications Managers. Journal of Information Technology Management, 1997
- The Unidimensionality, Validity, and Reliability of Moore and Benbasat's Relative Advantage and Compatibility Scales. Journal of Computer Information Systems, 1997
- Renegade: The Case of a Problem Employee. Journal of the International Academy for Case Studies, 1997
- Using Current Events to 'Jump-start' Class. Innovation Abstracts, 1996
