= Jessica A. Scoffield =

American microbiologist

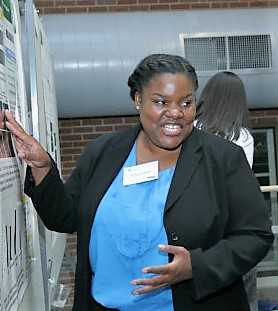
- Scoffield in 2015
- Born: Chattanooga, Tennessee, U.S.
- Education: Tuskegee University; Auburn University
- Known for: Mechanisms of commensal bacteria interference of pathogenic bacterial growth in oral cavity and lungs
- Awards: 2019 inaugural recipient of the American Association for Dental Research Procter and Gamble Underrepresented Faculty Research Fellowship, 2017 Most-esteemed Postdoc Award UAB
- Scientific career
- Fields: Microbiology
- Workplaces: University of Alabama at Birmingham

Jessica A. Scoffield is an American microbiologist and an assistant professor in the Department of Microbiology at the University of Alabama at Birmingham School of Medicine. Scoffield studies the mechanisms by which oral commensal bacteria interfere with pathogenic bacterial growth in order to inform the development of active therapeutic tools to prevent drug resistant pathogen infection. In 2019, Scoffield became the inaugural recipient of the American Association for Dental Research Procter and Gamble Underrepresented Faculty Research Fellowship.

== Early life and education ==
Scoffield grew up in Chattanooga, Tennessee. She pursued her undergraduate degree at Tuskegee University in 1998, which is when she discovered her passion for biomedical research. Scoffield graduated with a Bachelor of Science in biological sciences in 2002. Following her undergraduate degree, Scoffield stayed at Tuskegee University to complete her Master of Science in biology. While at Tuskegee, Scoffield helped to design plant growth systems for space missions and then helped develop edible vaccines using plants. She explored the use of Agrobacterium-mediated gene transfer efficiency in sweet potato cultivars, in an effort to improve sweet potato production in Alabama. She presented this emerging technology at the In Vitro Cellular and Developmental Biology Symposium. She completed her Master's training in 2004.

Following her master's, Scoffield pursued her graduate training at Auburn University in Auburn, Alabama. She trained under Laura Silo-Suh in the Department of Biological Sciences and she explored the mechanisms by which Pseudomonas aeruginosa growth mechanisms and virulence factor production. P. aeruginosa infections are one of the leading causes of chronic pulmonary infections in people with cystic fibrosis, often resulting in mortality. Her work helped to explore which environmental factors and adaptations lead to persistent and severe infection in CF patients. Probing the metabolic glyoxylate pathways of P. aeruginosa, Scoffield found that isocitrate lyase, an important enzyme in the glyoxylate pathway, facilitated adaptation of P. aeruginosa to the CF lung. They also found that the glyoxylate pathway becomes up-regulated in specific bacterial isolates from CF patient lungs. Based on this finding, Scoffield explored the genetic mechanisms of pathway up-regulation and she showed that GlpR, a transcriptional repressor for glycerol metabolism, also regulates the glyoxylate pathway, shedding light on the interactions between fatty acid and glycerol metabolism in P. aeruginosa. Scoffield completed her PhD in microbiology in 2012.

== Career and research ==
After completing her PhD, Scoffield pursued her postdoctoral training at the University of Alabama at Birmingham. She trained under the mentorship of Hui Wu in the Department of Pediatric Dentistry. Scoffield continued to study P. aeruginosa, but focused on its infection of the oral cavity. She explored how commensal bacteria in the mouth help to suppress P. aeruginosa infection. She found that commensal bacteria in the oral cavity suppress the growth and infection of pathogenic P. aeruginosa through their release of nitrate and H_{2}O_{2}. This work suggests that H_{2}O_{2} and nitrate may present an infection treatment strategy in patients with P. aeruginosa infections. Scoffield then found that P. aeruginosa require nitrite reductase to survive in the presence of nitrite producing commensal oral bacteria.

In 2018, Scoffield was appointed to assistant professor at the University of Alabama at Birmingham in the Department of Microbiology. She also holds secondary appointments in the Department of Medicine Division of Pulmonary, Allergy, and Critical Care, as well as an appointment in the Department of Pediatric Dentistry. Scoffield also works in the Cystic Fibrosis Research Center. Scoffield is a member of the American Society for Microbiology as well as the American Association for Dental Research (AADR). In 2019, she became the inaugural recipient of the AADR Procter and Gamble Under-represented Faculty Research Fellowship.

Scoffield is also the principal investigator of the Scoffield Lab. Her lab explores the role of commensal bacteria in maintaining homeostasis. The lab focuses on both oral and pulmonary commensal bacteria and how these bacteria are able to control and suppress pathogenic bacteria in these niches. The main pathogenic bacteria the Scoffield Lab explores are Streptococcus mutans, the major cause of pathogenic oral infection, and P. aeruginosa, the major cause of pulmonary infection in CF patients. In 2019, Scoffield and her team explored how P. aeruginosa infection of microglia impacts extracellular vesicle (EV) biogenesis and composition. The team found that P. aeruginosa infection and treatment of microglia with P. aeruginosa EVs altered protein and mRNA expression in microglia derived EVs and led to decreased cell viability. These findings suggest that EVs alone could be used as a biomarker of infection and guide the development of tools to target resistant bacteria.

== Awards and honors ==
- 2019 inaugural recipient of the American Association for Dental Research Procter and Gamble Underrepresented Faculty Research Fellowship
- 2017 postdoctoral paper featured in Nature Reviews Microbiology
- 2017 Most-esteemed Postdoc Award University of Alabama at Birmingham
- 2016 NIH K99/R00 Pathway to Independence Award

== Select publications ==
- Jones LB, Kumar S, Bell CR, et al. Effects of Pseudomonas aeruginosa on Microglial-Derived Extracellular Vesicle Biogenesis and Composition. Pathogens. 2019;8(4):297. Published 2019 Dec 14. doi:10.3390/pathogens8040297
- Scoffield JA, Duan D, Zhu F, Wu H. A commensal streptococcus hijacks a Pseudomonas aeruginosa exopolysaccharide to promote biofilm formation. PLOS Pathogens. 2017;13(4):e1006300. Published 2017 Apr 27. doi:10.1371/journal.ppat.1006300
- Scoffield JA, Wu H. Nitrite reductase is critical for Pseudomonas aeruginosa survival during co-infection with the oral commensal Streptococcus parasanguinis. Microbiology. 2016;162(2):376-383. doi:10.1099/mic.0.000226
- Scoffield JA, Wu H. Oral streptococci and nitrite-mediated interference of Pseudomonas aeruginosa. Infection and Immunity. 2015;83(1):101-107. doi:10.1128/IAI.02396-14
- Hagins JM, Scoffield JA, Suh SJ, Silo-Suh L. Influence of RpoN on isocitrate lyase activity in Pseudomonas aeruginosa. Microbiology. 2010;156(Pt 4):1201-1210. doi:10.1099/mic.0.033381-0
- Egnin, M., H. Gao, D. Mortley, J. Scoffield, S. Jack, and B. Bay. 2007. Gene expression profiling and the physiological role of t-Zeatin Riboside (ZR) in sweetpotato storage root initiation and enlargement. Horticultural Science. 42:976.
- Scoffield, Jessica, M. Egnin, B, Bey, M. Quain, C.S. Prakash and D. Mortley. (2006). Development of an Efficient Agrobacterium-Mediated Gene Transfer System for Multiple Sweetpotato Cultivars. In Vitro Cellular & Developmental Biology. 42 (4):36A.
