= Charles Richard Saunders =

American chemist (1902–1981)

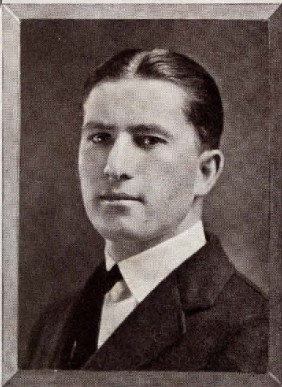
- Charles Saunders in 1923
- Born: August 30, 1902
- Died: October 20, 1981 (aged 79); Opelika, Alabama
- Education: Auburn University, University of Nebraska
- Spouse: Drusilla Mullane Saunders
- Children: 5
- Parents: Charles Saunders (father); Isabelle Ferguson Saunders (mother)
- Relatives: Frank Dent Sanders (uncle)
- Scientific career
- Workplaces: Lafayette College, Auburn University, DuPont Co.

Charles Richard Saunders (August 30, 1902 – October 20, 1981) was an American chemist who was dean of the School of Chemistry at Alabama Polytechnic Institute (API).

== Early life and education ==
Saunders was born on August 30, 1902. He grew up in Pensacola, Florida. He graduated from Pensacola High School. Charles Saunders obtained a Bachelor of Science in chemistry in 1923 and a Master of Science in chemistry in 1925 both at Auburn University. He then went on to get a doctorate in chemistry at the University of Nebraska.

== Career ==
In 1925, he began teaching at Lafayette College until 1928. After graduating from the University of Nebraska in 1930, he started working for the Dupont Company until 1932 when he started working for API as an assistant professor. AT API, he became part of the chemistry faculty. In 1942, Saunders was promoted to full professor. He was appointed dean of the School of Chemistry in 1950 until 1968. He would go on to continue to teach until retiring on September 1, 1971. Saunders was appointed State Chemist for Alabama in 1950, a position he would hold for more than 20 years.

== Personal life and relatives ==
Saunders married Drusilla Mullane and had five sons together. Saunders was a member of the Catholic Church. His great-great-grandmother was Martha Lumpkin, the daughter of Governor Wilson Lumpkin who named Marthasville, present day Atlanta, after her.

== Death and legacy ==
In 1972, The Alabama State Legislature named the chemistry building at the Physical Science Center on Auburn campus after him. Every year an award named after Saunders is given to an undergraduate student.

He died on October 20, 1981, at the East Alabama Medical Center in Opelika.

== See also ==
- Fred Allison
- William Vann Parker
- Wilson Lumpkin
