= Mrinalini Puranik =

Indian physicist

- Education: Indian Institute of Science
- Scientific career
- Workplaces: Unilever

Mrinalini Puranik is lead scientist at Unilever Limited. Her areas of research include bimolecular spectroscopy, Raman spectroscopy of proteins, and nucleic acids. She started her career as associate professor at Indian Institute of Science Education and Research, Pune (IISER). In 2015, her article "Solution structures of purine base analogues 9-deazaguanine and 9-deazahypoxanthine" was published by the Journal of Biomolecular Structure and Dynamics.

Puranik studied for her M.Sc in Physics from University of Pune. Puranik was a Chevening Rolls-Royce Science and Innovation Leadership Programme (CRISP) scholar at University of Oxford.
