= Susan Whitson =

American government official

Susan Dryden Whitson is an American former White House official who served as press secretary and chief communications advisor to first lady of the United States, Laura Bush from 2005 to March 2007.

Prior to working at the White House, Whitson was the Deputy Communications Director for the George W. Bush 2004 presidential campaign and the spokesperson for the President and Mrs. Bush's twin daughters, Barbara and Jenna Bush. She served as the Chief of the National Press Office for the FBI and as the Deputy Director of the Office of Public Affairs for the US Department of Justice. From 1997 to 2001, Whitson served as a press secretary for Rep. Bob Riley (R-AL), the former governor of Alabama, and Rep. Bill McCollum (R-FL) on Capitol Hill. Whitson was a high school English teacher at Hoover High School in Birmingham, Alabama from 1991 to 1997. She graduated from Auburn University in 1991 with a bachelor's degree in secondary language arts education.

During the attacks of September 11th, Whitson was flying from Washington to Milwaukee with Attorney General John Ashcroft.
