= Harold Franklin =

American academic (1932–2021)

Harold Alonza Franklin Sr. (November 2, 1932 – September 9, 2021) was an American academic who became the first black student to attend Auburn University in 1964 after successfully suing the university for excluding him because of race.

In order to prevent white students from being subjected to any contact with Franklin, Auburn removed all other students from an entire wing of a dormitory. Upon completion of his course work, professors used various pretexts to repeatedly refuse to accept his thesis. In 2001, Auburn recognized Franklin as their first black student, but didn't acknowledge that they had cheated him of a degree, and refused to allow him to discuss the Civil Rights Movement.

Several years later, he earned a master's degree from the University of Denver. He later taught at Alabama State University, North Carolina A&T State University, Tuskegee Institute and Talladega College, eventually retiring in 1992.

Fifty-one years later at the age of 86, Auburn finally granted his master's degree on February 19, 2020.

Franklin died on September 9, 2021.
