= Mrinal Thakur =

Indian academic

Mrinal Thakur is a professor in the Department of Mechanical Engineering of Auburn University in Alabama, USA. He holds a series of patents on electrically conductive polymers. Thakur claims that the 2000 Nobel Prize in chemistry to Alan J. Heeger, Alan MacDiarmid and Hideki Shirakawa was awarded for a scientific result he disproved in 1988: that only conjugated polymers could conduct electricity.

== Awards ==
Thakur was nominated for the Nobel Prize in Chemistry in 2002. He holds M.S. and Ph.D. degrees from Case Western Reserve University and a BS in Physics from Visva-Bharati University.

Publications of Mrinal Thakur

Patents of Mrinal Thakur
