= Bill L. Harbert =

American businessman (1923–2010)

Bill Lebold Harbert
- Born: July 21, 1923; Indianola, Mississippi, United States
- Died: June 27, 2010 (aged 86); Birmingham, Alabama, United States
- Occupations: Founder, Chairman and Chief Executive Officer
- Known for: B.L. Harbert International; Harbert Corporation
- Spouse: Joy Harbert
- Children: 3

Bill Lebold Harbert (July 21, 1923 – June 27, 2010) was an American businessman and founder of the international construction firm B.L. Harbert International. He was the brother of businessman John M. Harbert.

== Life ==
Harbert was born in Indianola, Mississippi on July 21, 1923. Soon after his family moved to Birmingham, Alabama, Harbert enrolled at Auburn University, where he graduated in 1948 after serving in World War II.

Following his graduation from Auburn, he and his older brother, John M. Harbert, founded Harbert Construction Company. The company, which later changed its name to Harbert Corporation, became one of the world's largest construction and engineering companies. In the early 1990s Harbert Corporation sold its domestic construction division to Raytheon in an effort to focus more on investment management. Soon after, the international division was sold to Bill Harbert. The international division became part of Bill Harbert International Construction (BHIC) in 1991. In 2000, Bill Harbert retired and assets of BHIC were sold. The company changed its name to B.L. Harbert International and is headed by Bill's son Billy Harbert.

On June 27, 2010, Harbert died at the age of 86 in Birmingham, Alabama. He was survived by his son Bill L. Harbert Jr. and his daughters Anne Harbert Moulton, and Elizabeth Harbert Cornay.
