= B.L. Harbert International =

American construction company

B.L. Harbert International, LLC
- Type: Private
- Industry: Construction
- Founded: 2000 as BL Harbert International
- Headquarters: Birmingham, Alabama, U.S.
- Key people: Billy L. Harbert, president and chief executive officer R. Alan Hall, chief financial officer
- Revenue: ▲$1.34 Billion USD (2023)
- Number of employees: 8,000 (2021)
- Website: www.blharbert.com

B.L. Harbert International, LLC, is a construction company based in Birmingham, Alabama, that was founded in 2000 by Billy L. Harbert, as a division of Harbert Corporation. B.L. Harbert has two main operating divisions, the U.S. Division and the International Division. The U.S. Division is further divided into the following divisions: commercial, healthcare, federal, and civil/industrial. They undertake the preconstruction, general construction, construction management, and design-build services of office buildings, condominiums, embassies, institutional buildings, healthcare facilities, churches, industrial facilities, water and wastewater treatment plants.

BL Harbert employed over 10,000 people around the world as of 2025. Much of the firm's business is in the form of federal government contracts for embassy construction projects abroad, the largest of these in cumulative contract value being U.S. Embassy Beirut ($613.8 million), U.S. Embassy New Delhi ($563.5 million), U.S. Consulate Erbil ($433.2 million), and Guatemala City ($288.5 million). In 2025 the company was ranked the 93rd largest contractor in the country by Engineering News-Record. They are also one of the top 100 contractors for the US government.

The company has additional U.S. offices in: Atlanta, Charleston, Houston, Huntsville, Oxford, Nashville and Washington D.C. The company has international offices in: London, Dubai, and Istanbul.

== Projects ==
- The Sandy and John Black Pavilion at Ole Miss, Oxford, Mississippi
- 57 U.S. Embassies or consulates
- Concord Center, Birmingham, Alabama
- Auburn Basketball Arena, Auburn, Alabama
