= Harbert Management Corporation =

U.S. investment management company

- Type: Private company
- Industry: Investment management
- Founded: 1993; 33 years ago
- Headquarters: Concord Center, Birmingham, Alabama, United States
- Key people: Raymond J. Harbert (Executive Chairman), J. Travis Pritchett (CEO, President), Raymond J. Harbert Jr. (CFO)
- Products: Real estate, Senior housing, Electric power, Private credit, Growth equity
- AUM: $8.0 billion (October 31, 2026)
- Number of employees: 150+
- Website: www.harbert.net

Harbert Management Corporation is an American investment management company. It is based in Birmingham, Alabama and was founded in 1993 by Raymond J. Harbert.

The company has investment funds in seven alternative asset classes in two areas of concentration real assets and private capital.

HMC has offices in Birmingham, Atlanta, Dallas, Nashville, New York, Richmond, San Francisco, London, Luxembourg, Paris, and Madrid.

== History ==
The company was founded in 1993.

In 1998, the company established the HERO Foundation, which provides direct financial assistance to help people who have been affected by natural disasters, medical conditions or temporary financial hardships to regain their independence and self-sufficiency.

The company was previously the majority owner of Harbinger Capital. HMC provided the original funding for Harbinger and its funds.

== See also ==
- B.L. Harbert International, founded by Bill L. Harbert from Harbert Corporation's former international construction division
- Harbinger Capital, hedge fund formerly owned by HMC
