= First American Cave =

Coordinates: 36.1659°N 86.7796°W

The First American Cave is an archaeological and paleontological site in downtown Nashville, Davidson County, Tennessee. The site was initially recognized in 1971 during construction of the foundations for the First American National Bank building at 315 Deaderick Street, when workers noticed a collection of bones being unearthed within a pocket of dirt approximately 30 feet below ground surface. Excavations were halted and both the Vanderbilt University Department of Anthropology and the Southeastern Indian Antiquities Survey were notified of the find. It was subsequently determined that the bones included those of humans, as well as a number of animal species, including a saber-tooth cat. The dirt pocket from which the bones had been disinterred was in fact a filled in cave, most of which had been destroyed by construction. The Southeastern Indian Antiquities Survey was given permission to excavate within the remaining portion of the cave with the assistance of Vanderbilt University students.

John Guilday of the Carnegie Museum of Natural History later conducted an examination of all bones recovered from the site, and published the results in the July 1977 issue of the Journal of the Tennessee Academy of Sciences. Although Guilday may have conducted an inventory of the human remains from the site, none was ever published. Today the human remains from the site are in the collection of the Vanderbilt University Department of Anthropology.

Radiocarbon analysis of human remains from the cave returned dates of 2390+/-145 B.P. and 1690+/-115 B.P., placing them within the Woodland period of regional prehistory. Portions of these burials were identified in situ approximately 16-feet above the depth of the bones of the saber-toothed cat. According to Guilday, collagen from the Smilodon remains returned radiocarbon dates of 9410+/-155 B.P. and 10,035+/-650 B.P. These dates are extremely late for the presence of Smilodon in the Southeast, and are likely the result of sample contamination.

As a result of interest that the site generated, First American Bank agreed to engineer around the small percentage of cave deposits that had not been destroyed. These deposits were vaulted over using steel and concrete, and preserved in an artificial cavern beneath the lowest parking garage level. An access hatch and ladder provided entry to the space. Newspaper and magazine articles from the early- to mid-1970s show there was interest among the archaeological community in conducting further excavations in what remained of the cave and in 1973 Time magazine reported that the bank was "preparing to let archaeologists resume their digging". In 1976 Southeastern Indian Antiquities Survey founder Bob Ferguson wrote that he was "certain much remains to be discovered when work resumes in the cavern, so thoughtfully preserved by the First American National Bank." However, plans to conduct additional investigations were apparently abandoned around the time bank construction was completed.

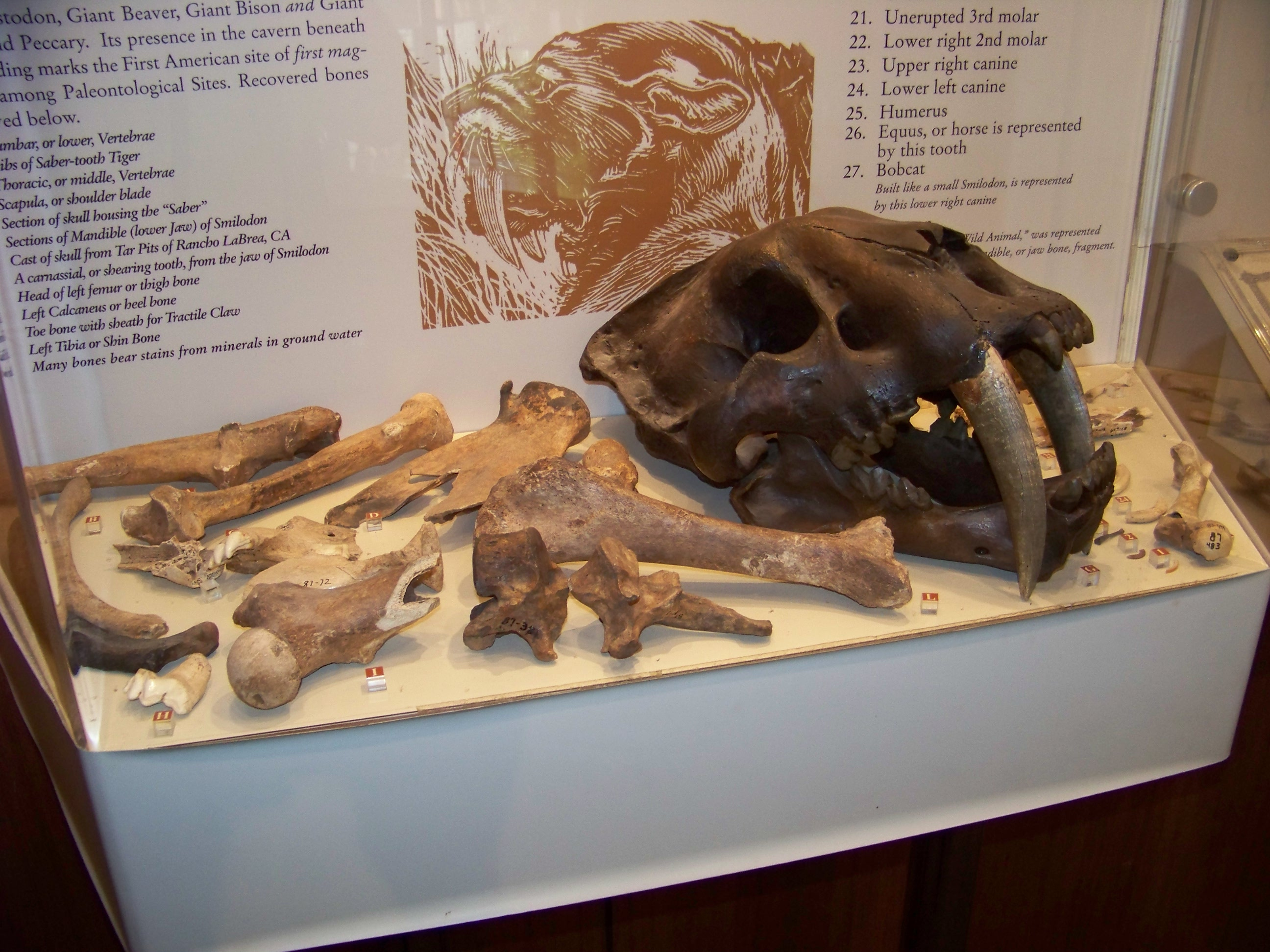
View of display case in the Regions Center lobby in 2008

In 1978, a group of cavers from the Nashville Grotto visited the site but were underwhelmed by the lack of intact cavern or open passages. The next documented entry into the cave did not occur until 2008, when archaeologists from the Tennessee Division of Archaeology revisited the site.

The First American Center was renamed when First American National Bank merged with AmSouth Bank, and again when AmSouth merged with Regions Financial Corporation. In 2013 Regions moved, and the majority of the building was taken over by the financial services company UBS. That same year the building was renamed from Regions Center to UBS Tower.

Until 2013 a display in the first floor lobby included bones from the Smilodon and other faunal material from the cave site. A replica of a Smilodon skull from the La Brea Tar Pits served as the centerpiece of the display. The Smilodon upper canine that led to the site discovery in 1971 is not on display, and is apparently no longer in the bank collection.

The remains are now on display at Bridgestone Arena in Nashville, home of the NHL Nashville Predators

In 1997 the Smilodon remains from First American Cave became the inspiration for the logo of the Nashville Predators hockey team and their mascot Gnash. Before the team exits the locker room prior to each home game, a video is shown on the jumbotron of a computer-generated saber-toothed cat emerging from the ground beneath downtown Nashville. The logo for AmSouth (as well as its predecessor, First American) was once prominently featured in the video but was digitally deleted when the bank dropped sponsorship of the team following the 2002-2003 NHL season.

== See also ==
- UBS Tower
- List of archaeological sites in Tennessee
- Saber-toothed cat
- Nashville Predators
