= TDCS =

TDCS may refer to:

- Transcranial direct-current stimulation
- Tennessee Department of Children's Services
