= AmSouth Center =

AmSouth Center may refer to:

- Regions Center (Birmingham) in Birmingham, Alabama, the AmSouth corporate headquarters from 1972 until 2006
- AmSouth Center (Nashville) in Nashville, Tennessee, which was a regional headquarters for AmSouth
