= First American National Bank =

American bank headquartered in Nashville, Tennessee

- Industry: Finance and Insurance
- Founded: September 1883
- Defunct: October 1, 1999
- Fate: Merged
- Successor: AmSouth Bancorporation; Regions Financial Corporation
- Headquarters: Nashville, Tennessee, USA
- Products: Financial services

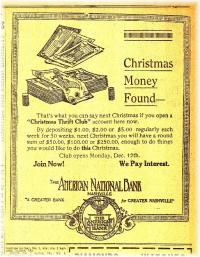
Old ad for American National Bank, predating its name change to First American.

First American National Bank was a subsidiary of First American Corporation, a financial institution based in Nashville, Tennessee, that served the states of Tennessee, Kentucky, Georgia and Virginia. It was headquartered in the First American Center in downtown Nashville.

The bank was founded in Nashville as American National Bank. In 1930, it merged with James E. Caldwell’s Fourth and First National Bank, forming First American National Bank.It continued its growth through the 1980s and 1990s by acquiring smaller banks throughout the state, such as Blout National, Park National, Northern Bank of TN and Middle Tennessee Bank.

In 1971, construction of the First American Center (now the UBS Tower) in downtown Nashville resulted in the discovery of the skeleton of a sabertooth cat (Smilodon floridanus) within a cave beneath the bedrock. First American National Bank facilitated archaeological excavations at the site, funded radiocarbon analysis of the bone, and altered their original building design to protect the remnants of the cave, which still exist beneath the lower level of the building's parking garage. The cave is known variously as the "First American Cave" or by its official state archaeological site number, 40DV40. In 1997, the Smilodon skeleton from the First American site was the source for the logo of the Nashville Predators hockey team and the inspiration for their mascot, Gnash.

FANB name and logo disappeared in December 2000 when it was acquired by Birmingham, Alabama, based AmSouth Bancorporation, a slightly smaller institution. First American operated as a fully owned subsidiary of AmSouth for most of 2000. First American was sold after a series of unprofitable mergers, including one with Jackson, Mississippi-based Deposit Guaranty Bank that proved to be a hurdle the corporation could not clear financially. Deposit Guaranty was fully integrated into First American, but kept its name. This allowed FANB to gain significant market share in Mississippi, Arkansas, and Louisiana, though it did not operate these branches as FANB. Branches in Iowa also did not operate under the First American banner.

First American's demise ended Nashville's storied history as a strong financial center. It, along with Third National Bank (now a part of SunTrust) and Commerce Union Bank (now a part of Bank of America), was once involved in a tight three-way battle for market share that ultimately helped all three banks expand well beyond their respective bounds. When the resources of the three could no longer stand the rapid expansion and numerous acquisitions, they all succumbed and merged with other banks. FANB, the largest of these three banks, was the only one to fold itself into a smaller institution. As of 2007, Nashville is still home to several local banks, but most do not exist outside of Davidson County.

Until 2005, AmSouth Bank continued First American's former tradition of having the highest market share in Nashville, however it was surpassed by SunTrust after its acquisition of Memphis-based National Commerce Financial. In 2006, AmSouth reclaimed the distinction of largest market share in metropolitan Nashville. In 2006-2007, AmSouth merged with Regions Financial Corporation which is headquartered in Birmingham. The newly combined bank retained Nashville's largest market share in addition to AmSouth's CEO, C. Dowd Ritter continuing as CEO of the company.

== Sponsorships ==
First American was very visible in the Nashville area and carried a large load of sponsorships, most notably the now-closed First American Music Center, to which it held naming rights for just one season before selling to AmSouth. First American also prided itself as the "official bank" of several Nashville-based sports franchises, including the Tennessee Titans, Nashville Predators, Nashville Kats, and Nashville Sounds. Following the purchase, AmSouth/Regions opted to let each of these sponsorships expire without renewal. Regions returned as the official bank of the Predators beginning with the 2024-25 season, which included signage on the playing surface and logos on the team's uniforms.

== Other "First American" banks ==
There are several regional banks around the United States that now carry the "First American" name. One in particular, in Mississippi, has adopted the full name "First American National Bank". None of these regional institutions are affiliated with the former First American National Bank or AmSouth Bancorporation.
