= Tennessee Department of Children's Services =

Government agency in Tennessee, United States

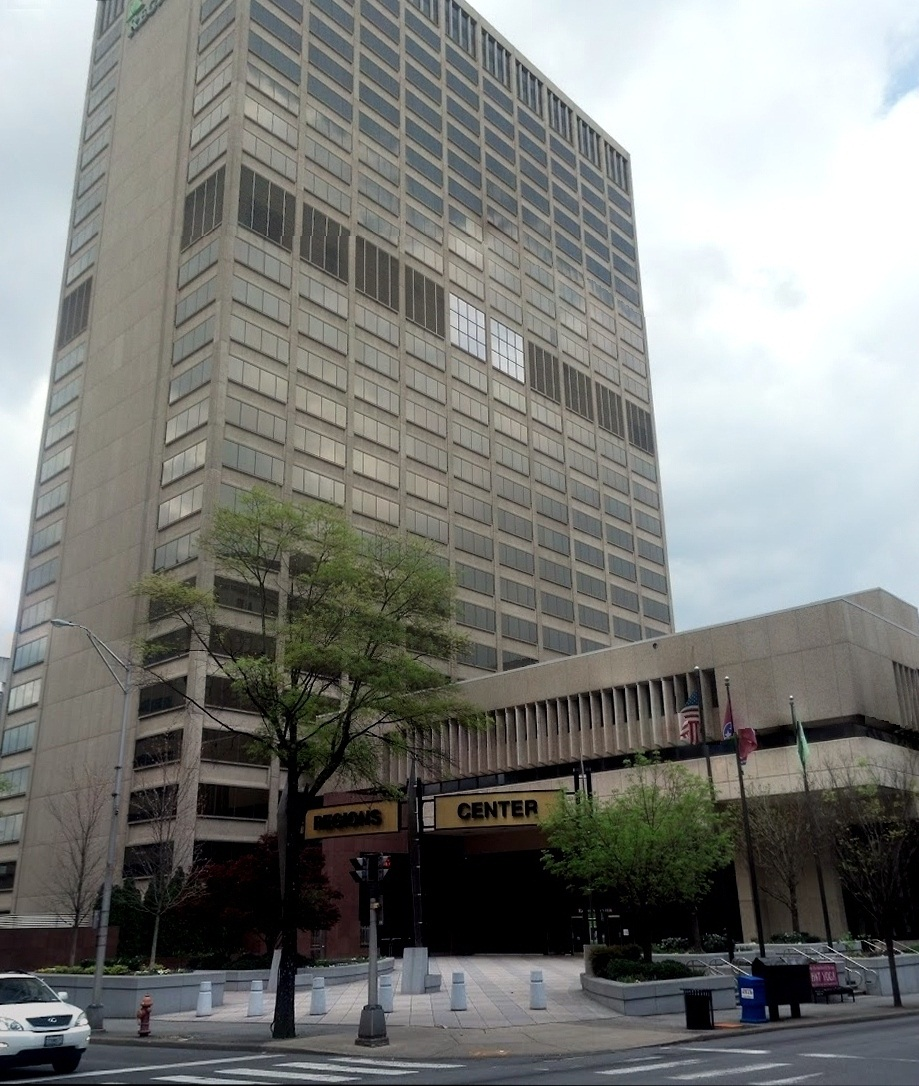
- The administrative headquarters of TDCS in Nashville

Child protective services agency overview
- Formed: April 1996
- Type: State agency
- Jurisdiction: Government of Tennessee
- Headquarters: 315 Deaderick Street, 10th floor, UBS Tower, Nashville, Tennessee 37238; 36.1659°N 86.7796°W
- Employees: 4,200
- Annual budget: $991.3 million (2021)
- Child protective services agency executive: Margie Quin, Commissioner
- Website: www.tn.gov/dcs.html

The Tennessee Department of Children's Services (TDCS) is a state agency of Tennessee that operates services for children and youth. It is currently headquartered on the tenth floor of the UBS Tower in Nashville. The current commissioner is Margie Quin, who assumed office on September 1, 2022.

== Juvenile facilities ==
The Division of Juvenile Justice operates three juvenile correctional facilities for male juveniles. In addition it contracts with G4S Youth Services, which operates the G4S Academy for Young Women, which has services for female juveniles. The G4S Academy is housed on the Clover Bottom Developmental Center campus in Donelson. The Clover Bottom complex is owned by the State of Tennessee.

The three youth development centers for male juveniles are hardware-secured long-term confinement facilities for juvenile prisoners. The youth development centers serve juveniles ages 12–19.

- Mountain View Development Center - Dandridge
- Wilder Youth Development Center - Unincorporated Fayette County
- Woodland Hills Youth Development Center - Nashville
  - This includes the property that was formerly the New Visions Youth Development Center for female juveniles. In 2012 the state began contracting with G4S and integrated the former New Visions property into Woodland Hills.

Previously it operated the following:

- New Visions Youth Development Center - Nashville - The only female YDC facility, New Visions served all of Tennessee. - Around 2012 the New Visions property was to be combined with Woodland Hills YDC.
- Shelby Training Center - Memphis
- Taft Youth Center - Unincorporated Bledsoe County
  - It opened around 1917. In 2011 Governor of Tennessee Bill Haslam called for several budget cuts, so Kathryn O'Day, the commissioner of DCS, called for the closure of this facility that November, stating there would be annual savings of $8.5 million. The final three inmates were moved out of the facility in 2012. The Taft property was given to the Tennessee Department of Corrections, which operates adjacent adult prisons: Bledsoe County Corrections Complex and Southeast Tennessee State Regional Correctional Facility.
