= List of NHL mascots =

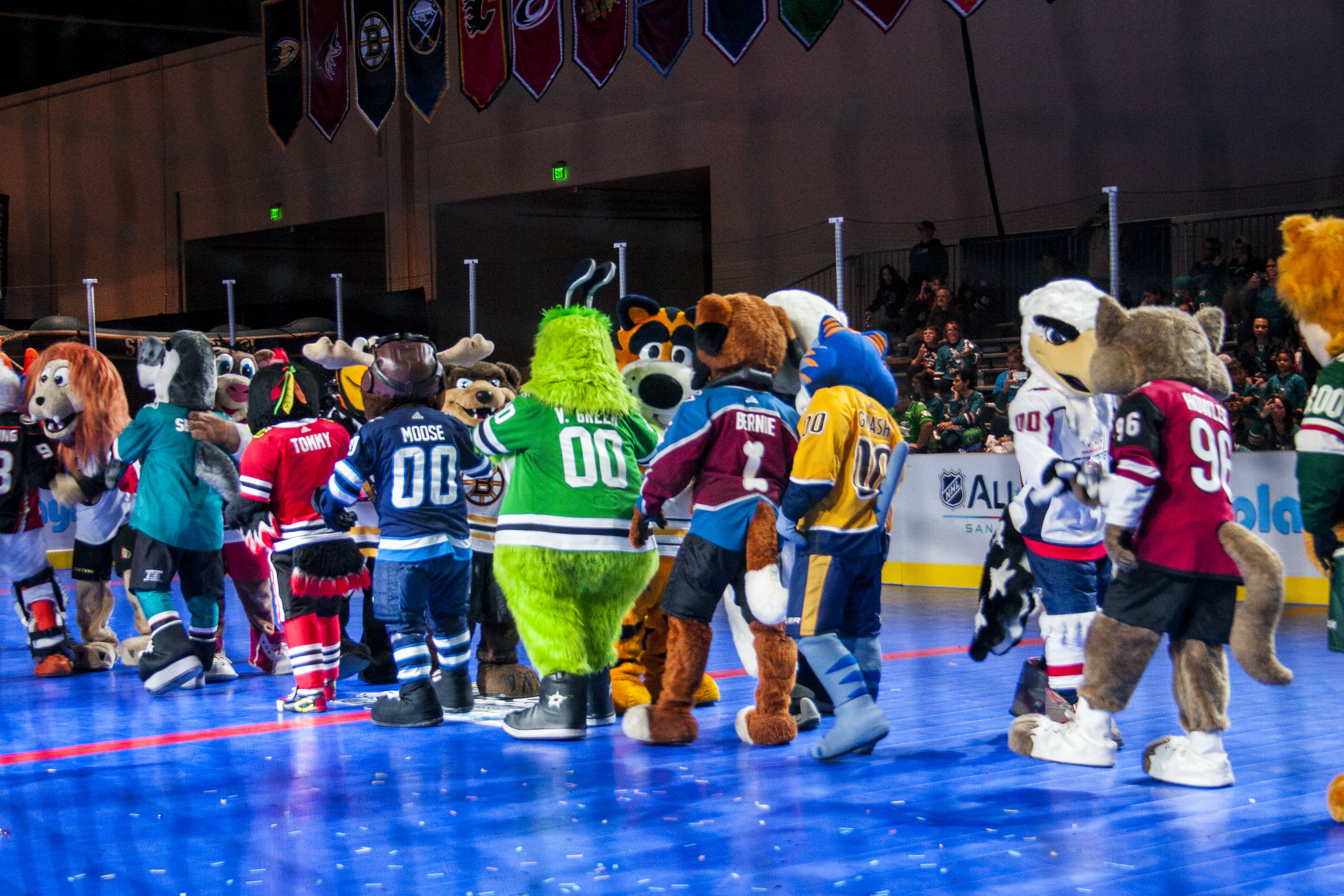
Mascots shaking hands at the 2019 All-Star Game

This is a list of current and former National Hockey League (NHL) mascots. The NHL's first mascot, Harvey of the Calgary Flames, debuted in 1983. As of 2026, the New York Rangers are the only team without a mascot.

== Current teams ==
=== Anaheim Ducks ===
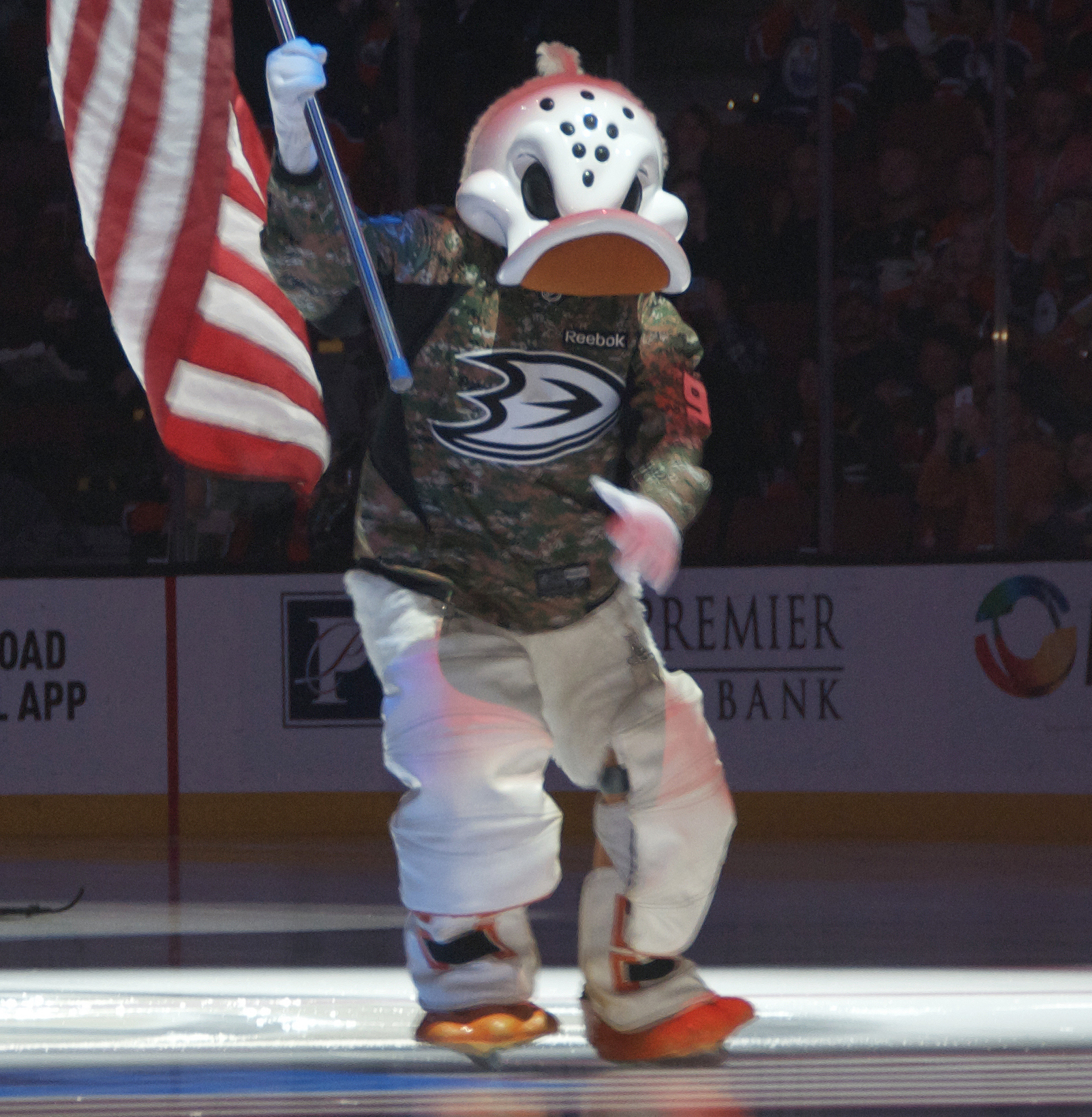
Wild Wing during 2015 Veterans Day tribute

Wild Wing, the mascot of the Anaheim Ducks, descended from the rafters of Anaheim Arena before their very first game on October 8, 1993. Wild Wing was introduced by Iceman, a short-lived speaking mascot that was "pretty much canceled before the end of the opening game".

An anthropomorphic duck, Wild Wing has been featured on the Ducks' jerseys. Wild Wing's name was chosen following a fan "Name the Mascot" write-in contest. During the team's 1995 home opener against the Calgary Flames, Wild Wing caught fire attempting to jump over a wall of flames, after his skates caught on a trampoline. Wild Wing was the basis for the protagonist of the 1996–97 animated series Mighty Ducks.

=== Boston Bruins ===
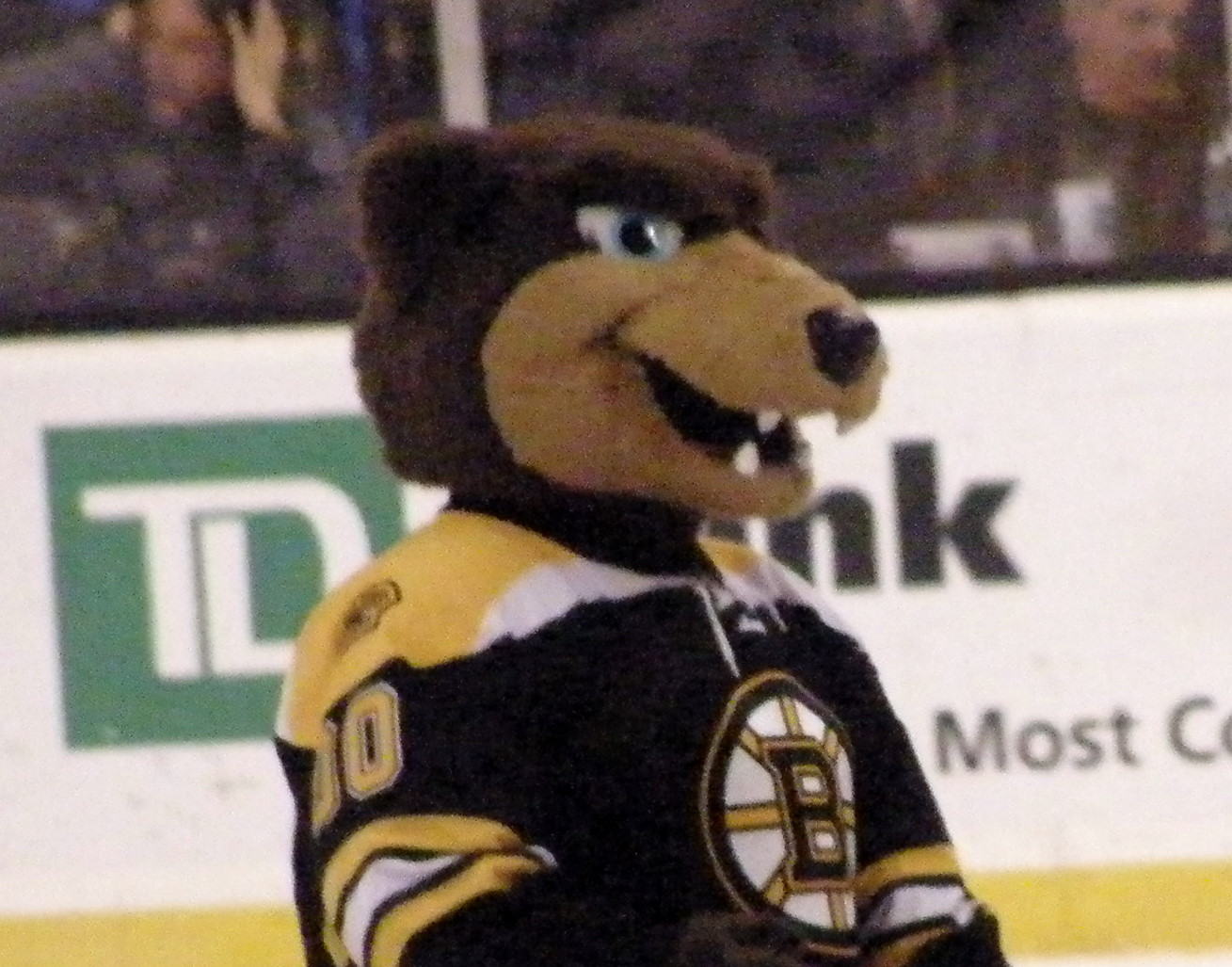
Blades in 2010

Blades is the mascot of the Boston Bruins. A bipedal brown bear, Blades was named in 2000 by nine-year-old Jillian Dempsey, who later became a professional player.

=== Buffalo Sabres ===
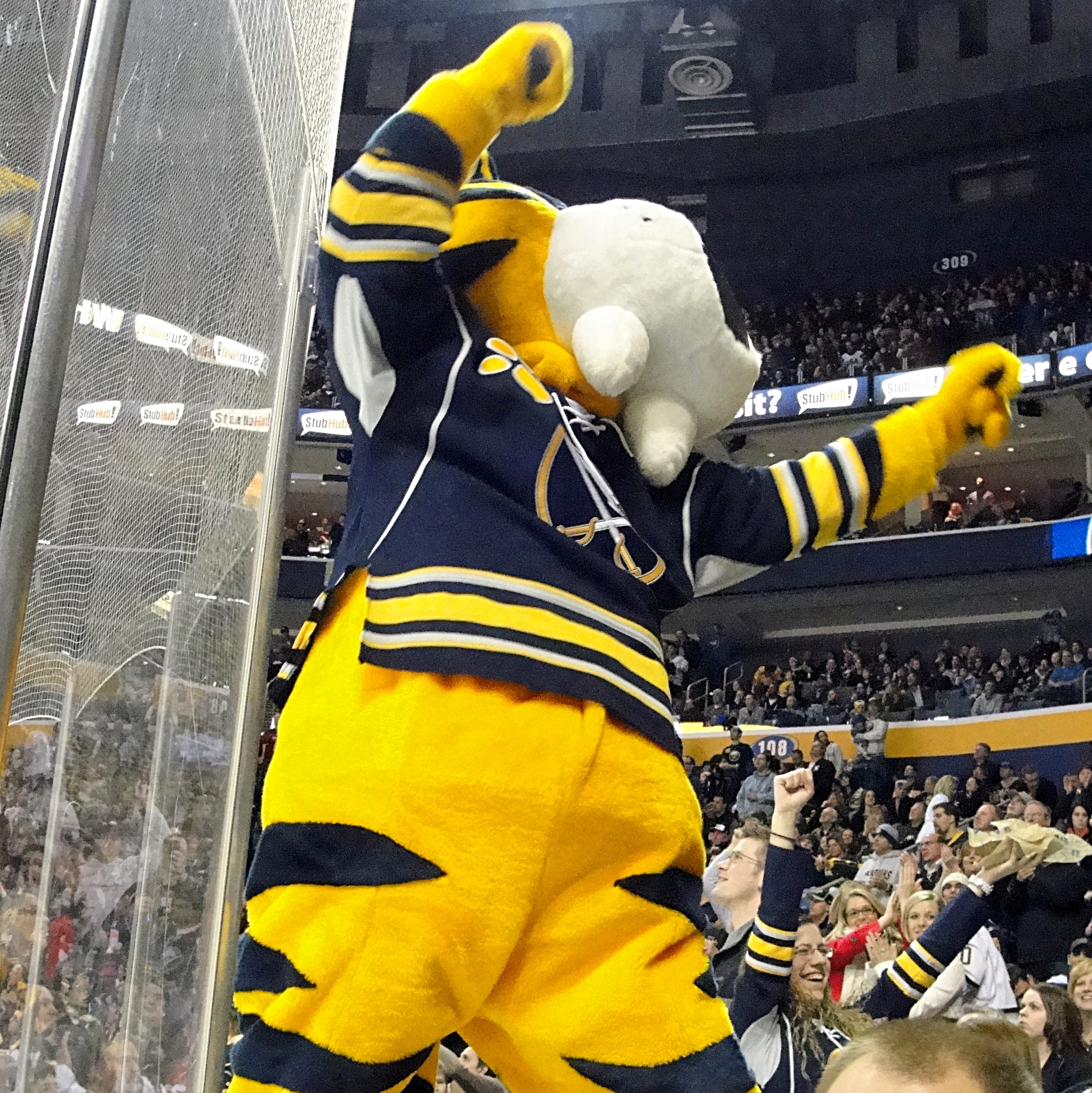
Sabretooth in 2012

Sabretooth is the mascot of the Buffalo Sabres. Sabretooth debuted with the Sabres in the 1988–89 season. From 1992 to 1998, he was the mascot of the Buffalo Bandits of the National Lacrosse League. He is a yellow anthropomorphic sabretooth tiger with blue stripes, and has protruding teeth.

=== Calgary Flames ===
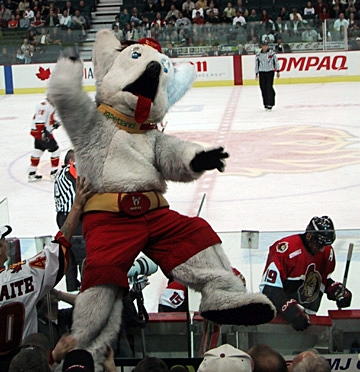
Harvey in 2000

Harvey, the mascot of the Calgary Flames, debuted in 1984 as the NHL's first mascot. He is an anthropomorphic Siberian Husky. In 2003, Edmonton Oilers coach Craig MacTavish ripped out Harvey's tongue during a game.

=== Carolina Hurricanes ===
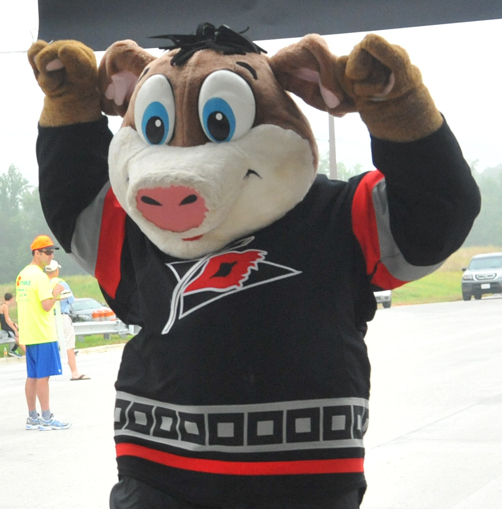
Stormy in 2012

Stormy the Ice Hog is the mascot of the Carolina Hurricanes. An anthropomorphic pig, Stormy wears the number 97.

The decision for Stormy to be a pig was inspired by North Carolina's pork industry. When the team was being moved from the Hartford Whalers, then-owner Peter Karmanos considered naming the team the "Ice Hogs". Then–general manager Jim Rutherford said the idea was also influenced by meetings with North Carolina politician Wendell Murphy. The theme was instead expressed through the mascot.

Stormy—unnamed at the time—debuted on September 22, 1997. During his debut, the human playing Stormy suffered a medical emergency. Stormy was officially named a month after his debut, on October 22, as the result of an internet survey of fans.

In the 2017–18 season, the Hurricanes introduced Caroline, a female counterpart to Stormy. Beginning in 2019, the Hurricanes were also unofficially supported by Hamilton, a real pig who had been adopted by fans. Stormy is portrayed by a full-time performer; Caroline is portrayed by three part-time performers.

=== Chicago Blackhawks ===
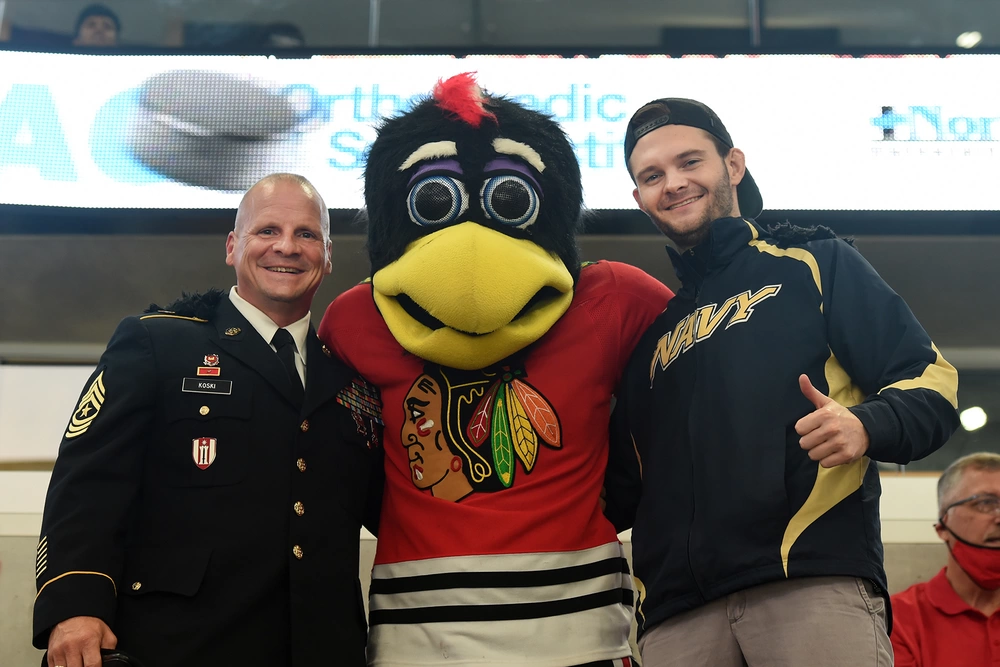
Tommy Hawk in 2021

Tommy Hawk is the mascot for the Chicago Blackhawks introduced during the 2001–02 season. He is a hawk who wears the Blackhawks' famed 4 feathers on his head, along with a Blackhawks jersey and hockey pants. In December 2018, Tommy Hawk was involved in an altercation with an unidentified fan which was caught on video that went viral.

=== Colorado Avalanche ===
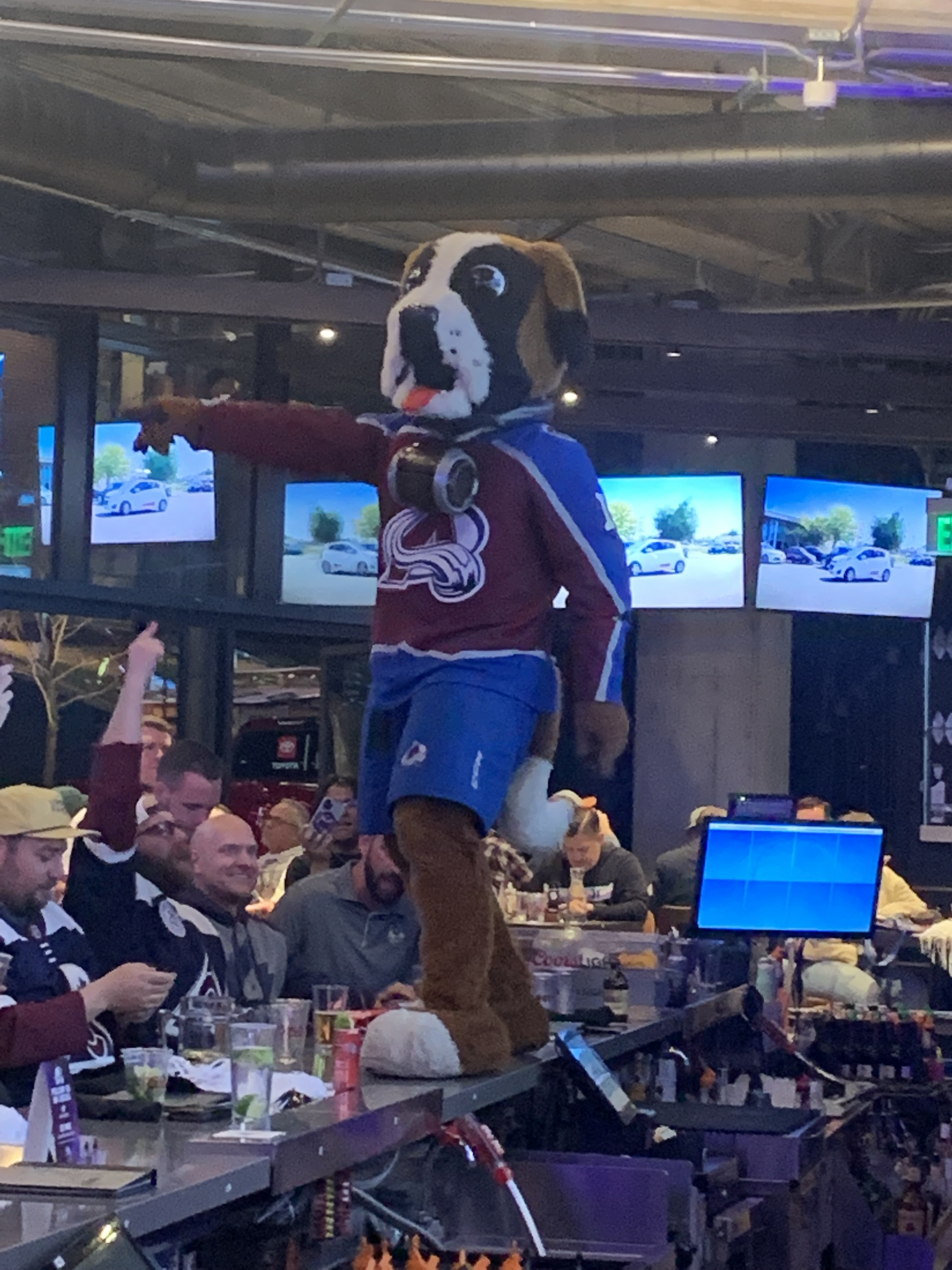
Bernie at an Avalanche watch party in 2022.

Howler was the first official mascot of the Colorado Avalanche, introduced when the team moved to Denver in 1995. As a large Yeti, his presence was symbolized by a footprint on the team's jerseys. Howler's tenure ended in 2001, following a 1999 incident involving a physical altercation with a fan at McNichols Arena.

Bernie, the newest mascot of the Colorado Avalanche, debuted to the public against the Vancouver Canucks at Pepsi Center on October 3, 2009, in Denver, Colorado. Bernie, short for Bernard, is a St. Bernard dog. Bernie's jersey is marked with a bone that resembles the #1. A fan page for Bernie was also unveiled October 3, 2009.

On January 30, 2022, the team introduced a new miniature version of Bernie named Lil' Bern.

=== Columbus Blue Jackets ===
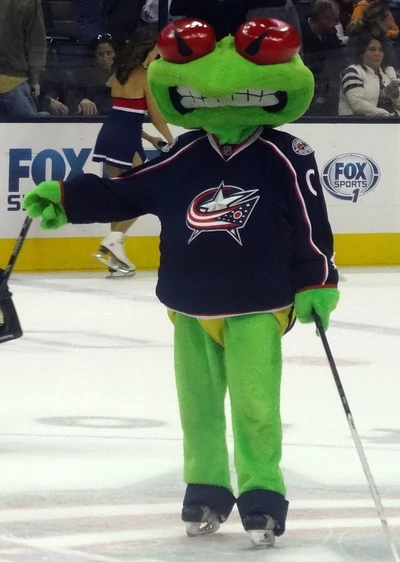
Stinger in 2022

Stinger is the mascot of the Columbus Blue Jackets. He is an anthropomorphic yellowjacket, colored bright green. Beginning in 1997, one of the Blue Jackets' alternate jerseys featured Stinger wearing a Union Army uniform. Stinger was introduced as the Blue Jackets' mascot at a 1999 Fourth of July parade.

Boomer was a secondary mascot who first appeared in November 2010. An anthropomorphic gray cannon with wheels and a large white mustache, Boomer was not well received due to his phallic appearance. Boomer was inspired by the goal cannon that fires whenever the Blue Jackets score a goal in their arena.

=== Dallas Stars ===
Victor E. Green is the mascot for the Dallas Stars. He is a furry green alien with hockey sticks for antennas who comes from a galaxy far, far away. His name is a play on the Dallas Stars' team color Victory Green or may be a reference to former owner Norman Green. He was introduced on September 13, 2014, and is the first mascot of the Stars' franchise. Victory Park is the name of the area of Dallas where the Stars play.

=== Detroit Red Wings ===
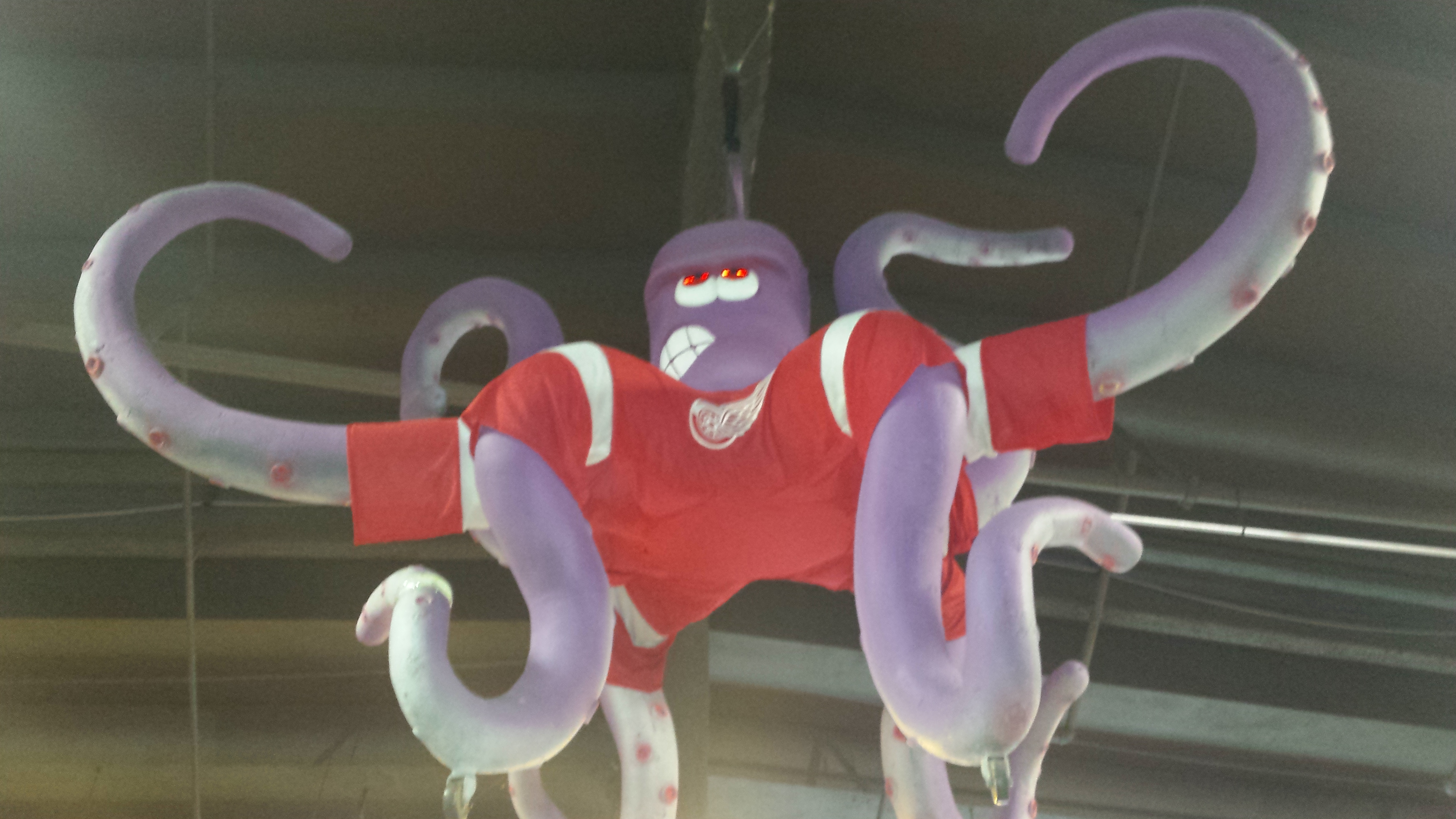
Octopus hanging from rafters in 2016

Al is the octopus mascot of the Detroit Red Wings. It is also the only mascot that is not costumed. In 1952, when east side fish merchants Pete and Jerry Cusimano threw a real octopus onto the Olympia arena ice, the eight legs represented the eight victories needed to secure a Stanley Cup in those six-team days. Since then, fans throw an octopus onto the ice for good luck. In the 1995 Playoffs, fans threw fifty-four onto the ice. Arena Manager and Zamboni driver Al Sobotka ceremoniously scoops them up and whirls them over his head, and play continues. NHL Commissioner Gary Bettman forbade Sobotka from doing so during the 2008 playoffs, claiming that debris flew off the octopuses and onto the ice. Sobotka and the Red Wings have denied that this occurs, but even so Sobotka acquiesced and now twirls the octopuses once he departs the ice. In 2011, the NHL forbade fans from throwing any octopuses on the ice, penalizing all violators with a $500 fine. This has led to local outcry at the seemingly intentional destruction of a classic tradition. Red Wings' forward Johan Franzen has pledged to pay any and all fines as an attempt to continue the tradition.

Two identical large purple prop octopuses (both named Al), named after ice manager Al Sobotka, used to be positioned in or on top of Joe Louis Arena for the duration of the playoffs. After closing down the arena after the 2016–2017 season, one was sold for $7,700.

The Detroit Red Wings mascot The Red Winger appeared when Mike Ilitch bought the team in 1982 and continued mascoting until the end of the 1987 season.

=== Edmonton Oilers ===
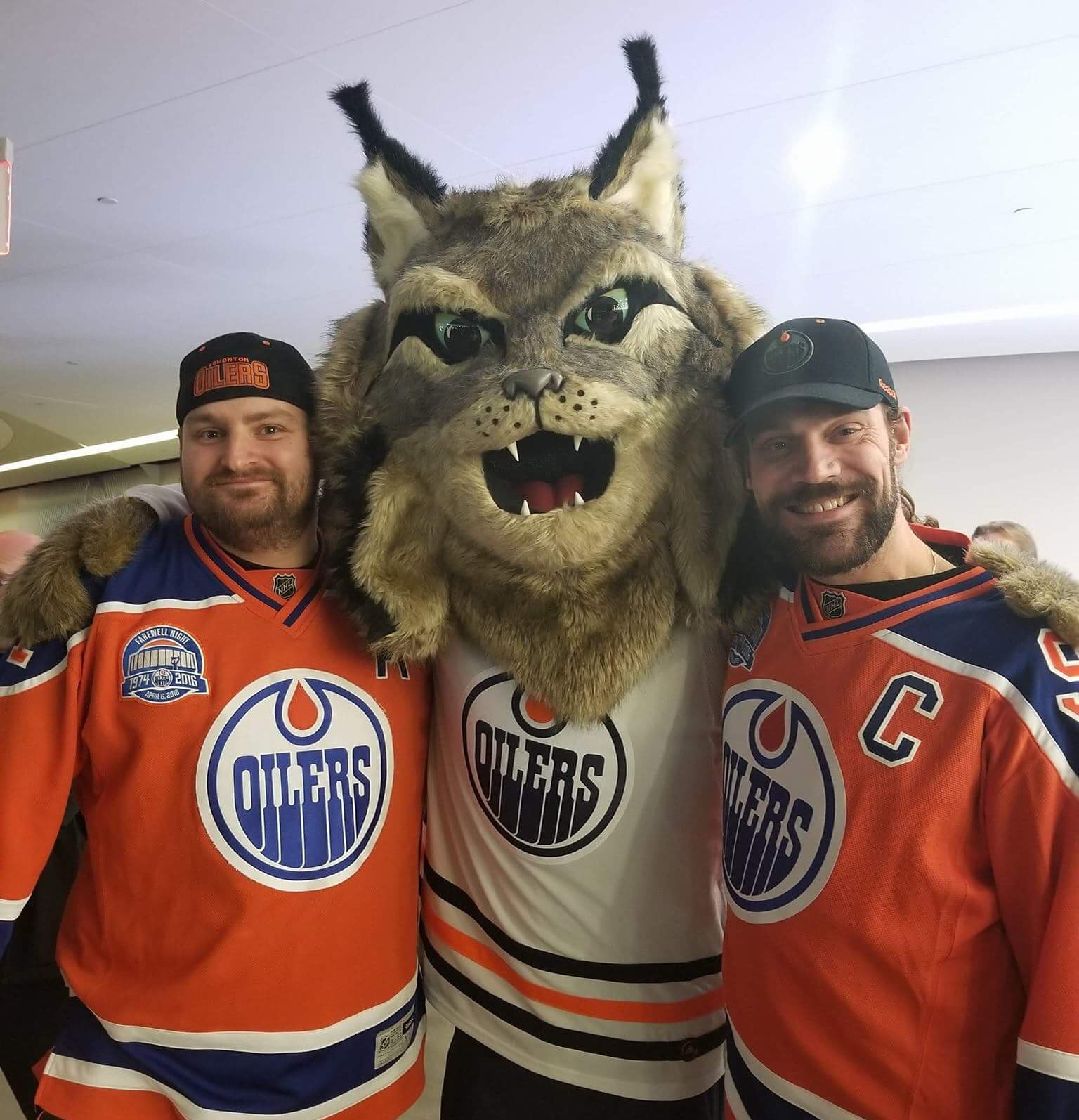
Hunter in 2017 with fans

Hunter is the mascot for the Edmonton Oilers. He is an anthropomorphic Canadian Lynx and is named after Bill Hunter. He was introduced on September 26, 2016, and wears the number 72, in reference to the team's founding in 1972. He is the team's first official mascot. On December 10, 2023, a new miniature version of Hunter named Kit was introduced to the public.

=== Florida Panthers ===
Stanley C. Panther was named in 1995 by Darrel Ambrosini and is an anthropomorphic Florida panther, hence the name of the mascot. He is named for the Stanley Cup.

Viktor E. Rat was named in October 2014 in honor of the club's 1996 Stanley Cup Final run where rats were tossed on ice and is an anthropomorphic rat.

At the beginning of the 2007–08 season, the Panthers added another mascot that is half the size of Stanley, hence the name "Mini Stanley". Due to Mini Stanley's smaller size, he is a mascot that caters more to children.

=== Los Angeles Kings ===
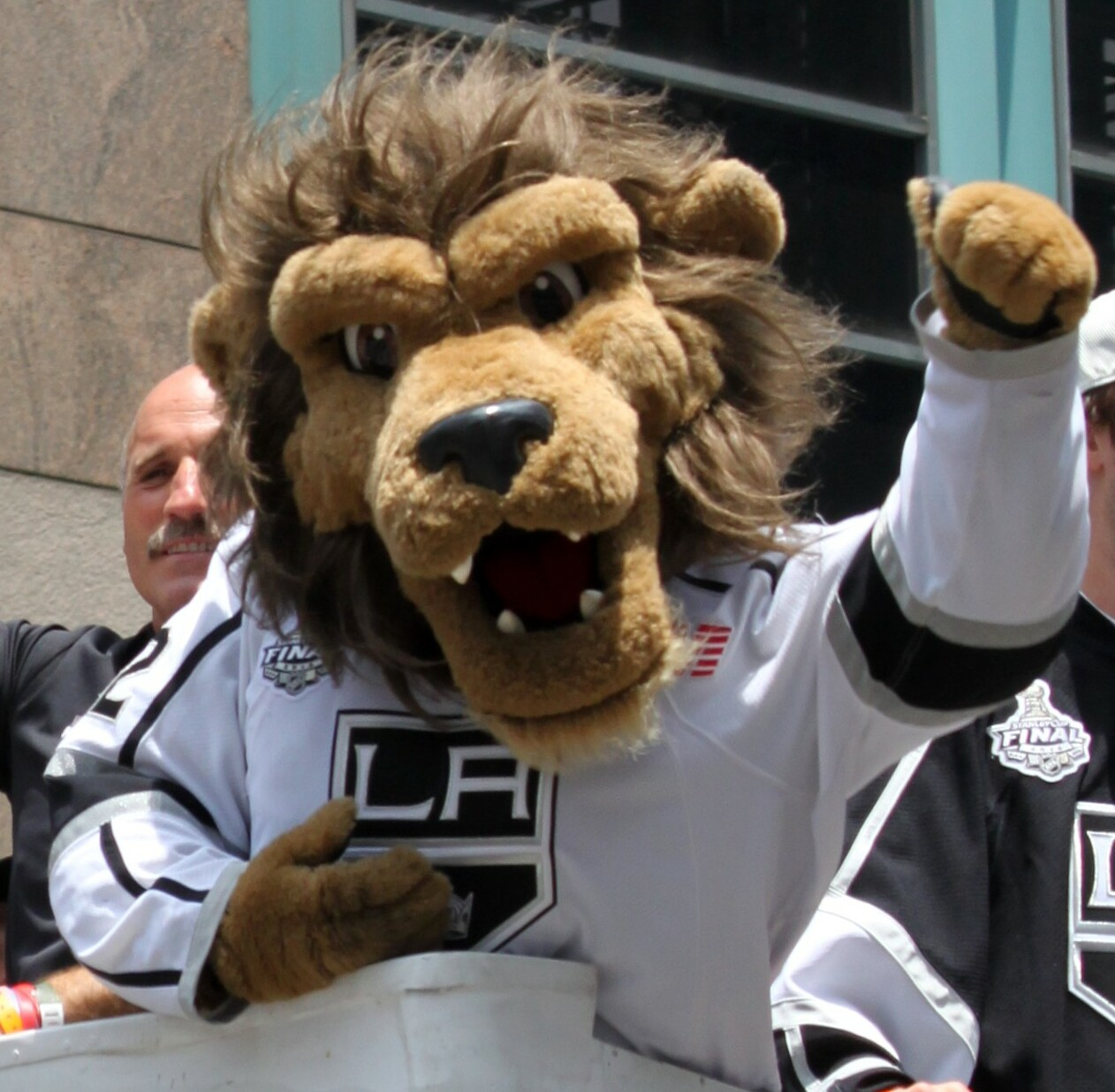
Bailey during the parade celebrating the 2012 title

Kingston was the first mascot of the Los Angeles Kings. He is a snow leopard and was the team mascot from 1990 to 1996. In 2015, Kingston came out of retirement to be the new mascot for the Kings' AHL affiliate, the Ontario Reign.

Bailey, the mascot of the Los Angeles Kings, is a 6-foot lion (6 foot 4 inches with mane included) who wears No. 72 because it is the average temperature in Los Angeles. He debuted during the 2007–2008 season and was named in honor of Garnet Bailey, who served as the Kings' Director of Pro Scouting from 1994 until his death in the September 11 attacks. He wears the patch worn by the Kings during the season following the attacks in honor of both Ace and Mark Bavis.

For the 2009–10 season, the Kings partnered with Carl's Jr. to create a series of videos in which Kings organization members competed against Carl's Jr. organization members. The first installment in which Bailey appears is a spoof on Carl's Jr.'s commercials, with Bailey replacing scantily clad actresses.

Since 2013, Bailey has been involved in a Twitter feud with CM Punk, a Chicago native and die-hard Chicago Blackhawks fan. During the 2014 playoffs when the Blackhawks faced the Kings in the Western Conference Finals, the two made a bet on the series stating that the loser must upload a picture of themselves wearing the winning team's jersey. Ultimately, Punk posted a picture of himself in front of United Center in Chicago wearing a Kings jersey after the Kings eliminated the Blackhawks in seven games. In the fall of 2014 during a Blackhawks-Kings game at Staples Center, Bailey jumped off his ATV and delivered an elbow drop to Punk in the backstage area.

Bailey did not make an appearance during the shortened 2021 season, but returned the following season with a slightly redesigned look, including a shaved mane. His new look was poorly received by fans, and in 2022, the Kings teamed up with the reality show Botched to give Bailey a second redesign, giving him a friendlier appearance with larger eyes and the return of his long mane. The new look was revealed on November 5th during an intermission.

=== Minnesota Wild ===
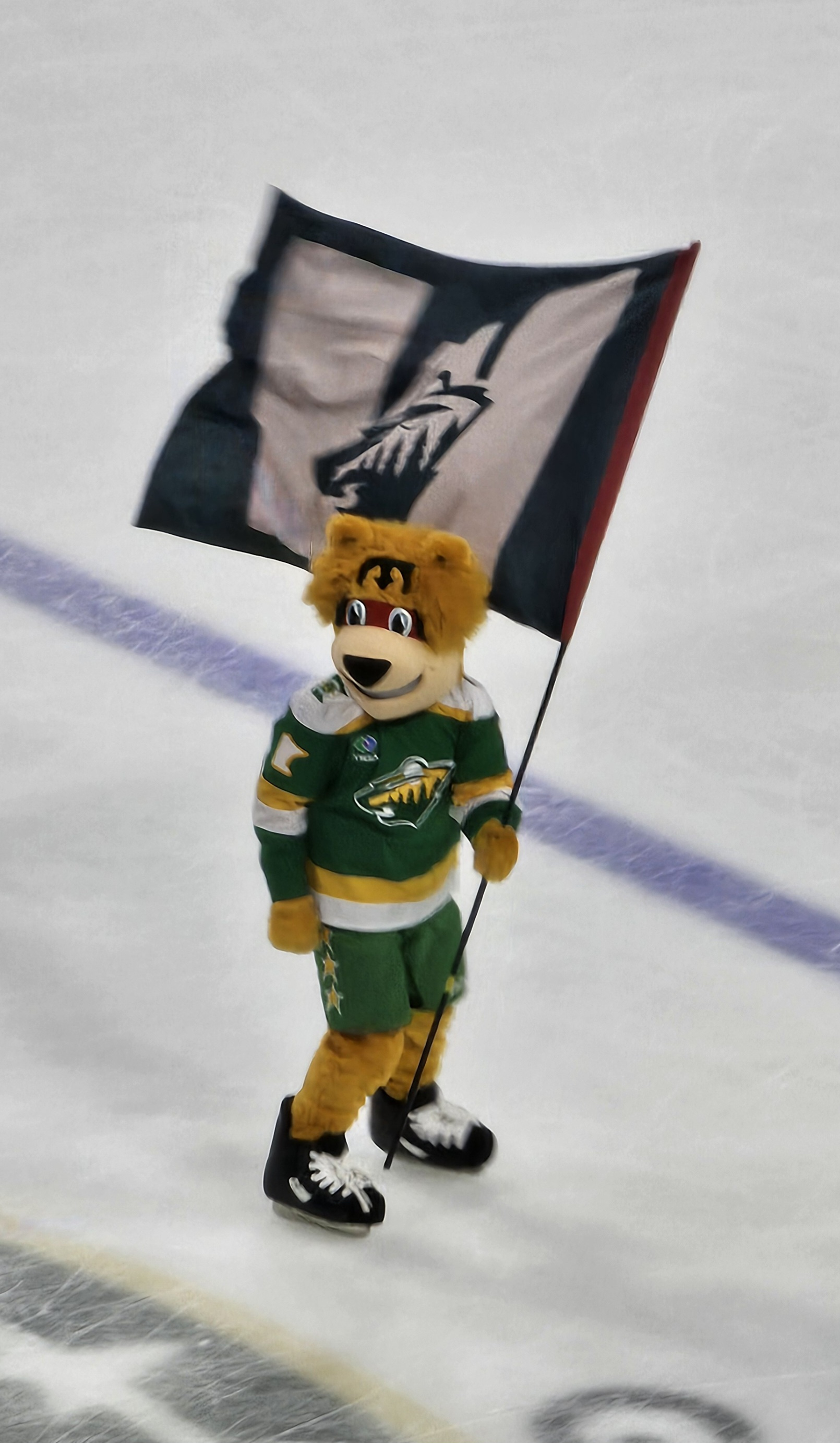
Nordy on the ice at Grand Casino Arena

The Minnesota Wild unveiled their mascot, named Nordy, on October 5, 2008. His species is intentionally ambiguous, vaguely resembling the team logo, wearing a "hockey hair" mullet and a green "M" on his forehead. Nordy wears the jersey number 18,001, a reference to their home arena's capacity.

=== Montreal Canadiens ===
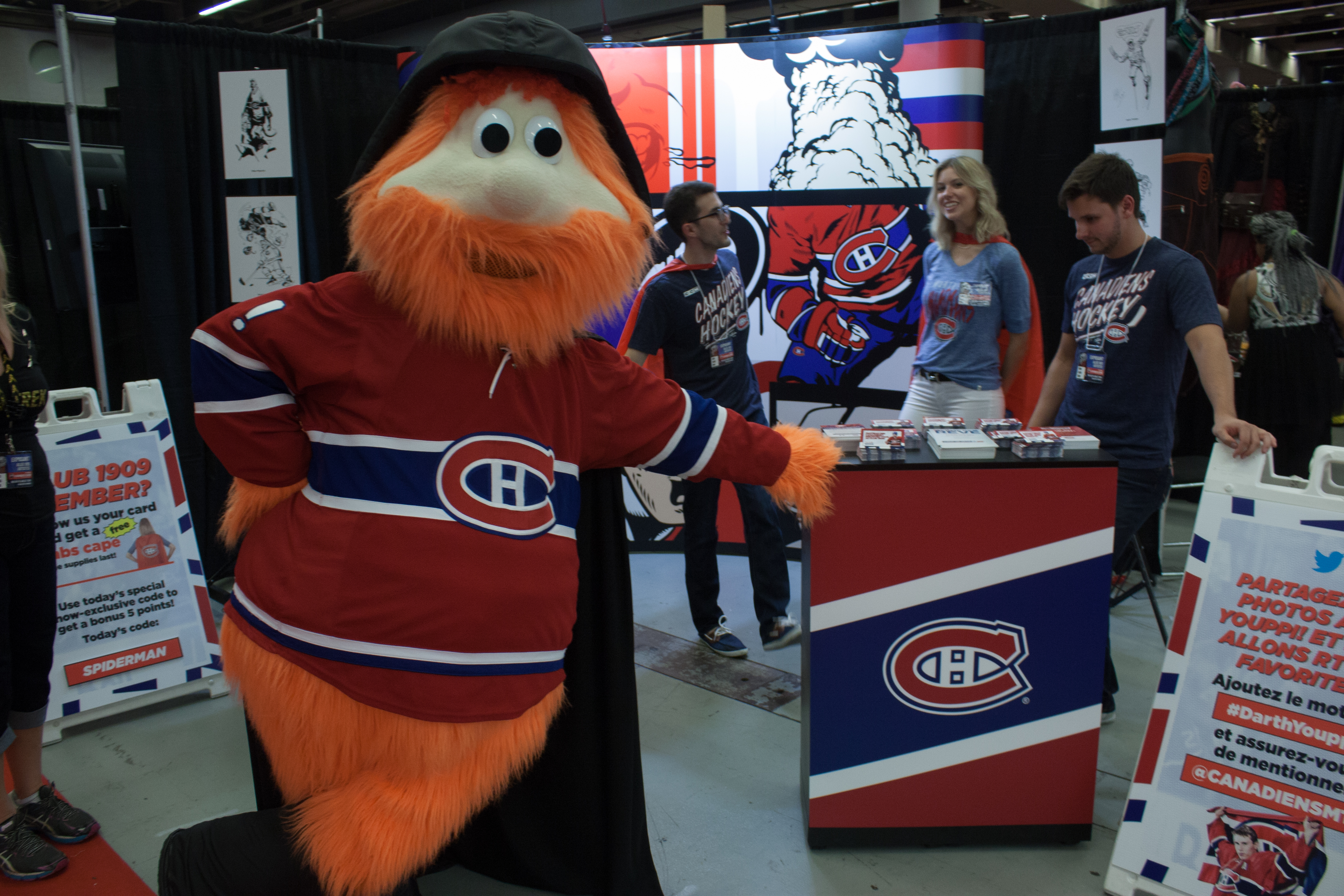
Youppi! at Montreal Comiccon in 2016

Youppi! (Yippee! or Hooray! in French) is the official mascot for the Montreal Canadiens. The exclamation mark is part of the trademarked name. From 1979 to 2004, Youppi! was the mascot of the Montreal Expos baseball team. When the Expos left Montreal, Youppi! was adopted by the hockey franchise, becoming the first league-switching mascot in major league sports history. Instead of endorsing a number in the back of his jersey, he wears an exclamation mark, which he had worn while with the Expos. Prior to Youppi!, the Canadiens had no official mascot.

In 2022, to promote the team's reverse retro jerseys, the team created METAL!, a heavy-metal-obsessed blue creature, who claims to have been Youppi!'s twin brother, and have been the Canadiens mascot from 1979 to 1993, even though there is no evidence of the latter statement.

=== Nashville Predators ===
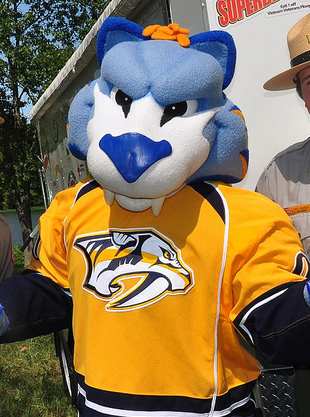
Gnash in 2011

Gnash is the mascot for the Nashville Predators. The saber-tooth tiger character was selected as the team mascot after archaeological excavations at the First American Cave site in downtown Nashville (in preparation for the construction of what is now known as the UBS Tower) unearthed the partial skeleton of a saber-tooth cat. The name "Gnash" is a pun on the first syllable of the city's name.

The character was introduced in 1998, the same year the team was founded. His trademark includes stunts: fast rappels from the arena rafters, jumping a 4-wheel/ATV off a ramp onto the ice, and a pendulum swing that takes him under the scoreboard and just inches off the ice. Gnash also dances during intermissions and pulls pranks on fans of the visiting team, usually ending with a pie in the face.

=== New Jersey Devils ===
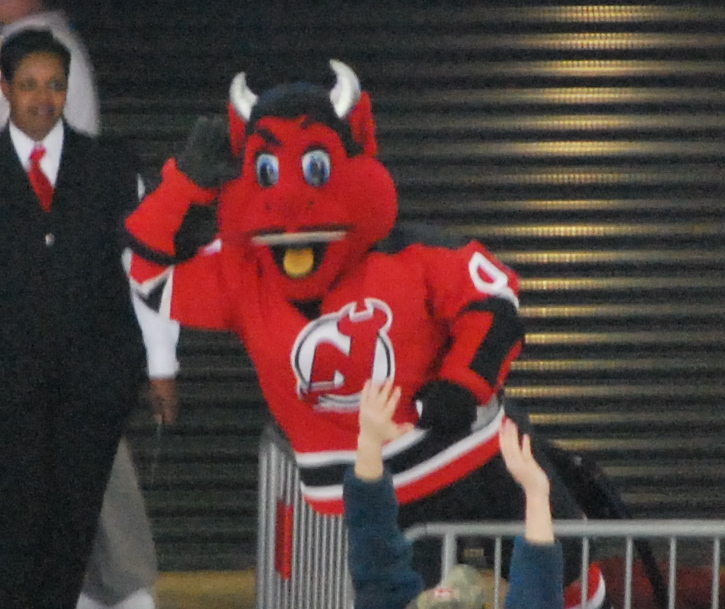
N.J. Devil in 2008

The New Jersey Devils had a mascot named Slapshot that was a giant anthropomorphic puck with devil horns. He was replaced with N.J. Devil in 1993.

NJ Devil is the mascot of the New Jersey Devils. He first appeared in 1993 and was spotted in the rafters of the then-Brendan Byrne Arena. The 7' tall mascot plays into the myth of the Jersey Devil. N.J. Devil often keeps the crowd excited, signs autographs, participates in entertainment during the intermissions, skates across the ice, and runs throughout the aisles of the arena to high five fans. Playing into the moniker, the N.J. Devil is also mischievous; pulling pranks on players in play-stoppage video sequences & fans of the opposition at games. N.J. Devil wears a red Devils jersey with his name and number 00 on the back.

=== New York Islanders ===
Sparky the Dragon is a large bipedal dragon mascot for the New York Islanders. He had served as the mascot for the New York Dragons Arena Football team until the team's 2009 demise. He wore royal blue and orange. His original navy blue color was changed in summer 2010 to match the Islanders' return to their classic color scheme. His tail resembles a hockey stick. For Dragons contests, he had worn pink, red, and black. The fact that both teams were owned by computer magnate Charles Wang and both teams played at Nassau Veterans Memorial Coliseum factored into this. On September 22, 2015, it was announced that Sparky would not return as the Islanders mascot at Barclays Center. However, he still made other appearances on Long Island and was shown in NHL ’16. As the 2015–2016 season progressed, Barclays Center CEO Brett Yormark to try and further appeal to the Long Island-centered fan base. On December 27, 2015, during the first intermission of an Islanders vs. Maple Leafs matchup, Sparky was officially reintroduced as the Islanders mascot.

Nyisles is a "seafaring Islander" that the New York Islanders originally used as a mascot in the mid-90s prior to Charles Wang obtaining the team and soon replacing him with Sparky the Dragon in 2001. Nyisles was brought out of retirement and given a makeover on December 10, 2022, to coincide with the return of the Fisherman logo on the team's reverse retro uniforms.

=== New York Rangers ===
The New York Rangers are the only team without a mascot.

=== Ottawa Senators ===
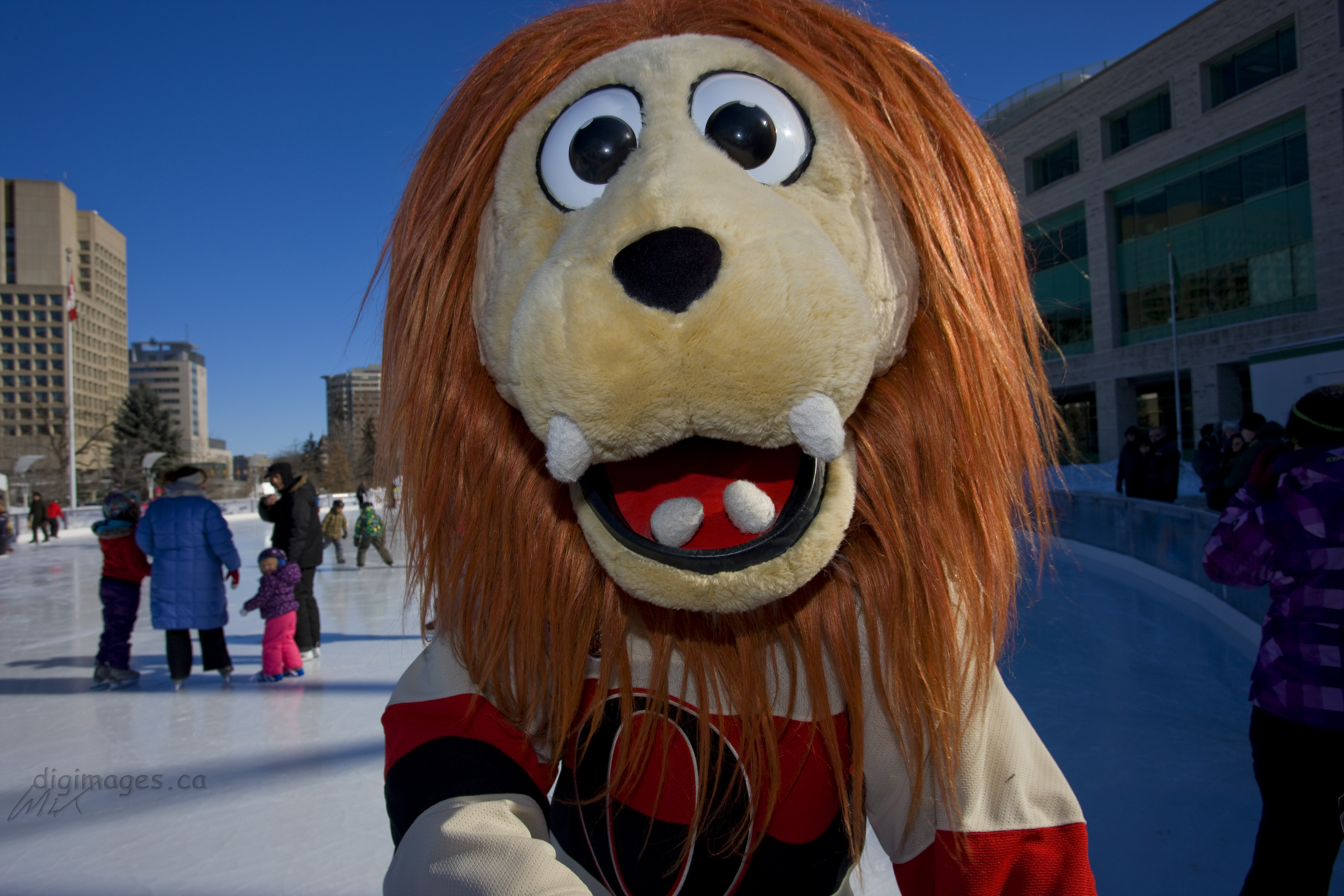
Spartacat at 2014 Winterlude in Ottawa

Spartacat is an anthropomorphic lion and the official mascot of the Ottawa Senators since 1992. He is also known to be quite an acrobat as he has been seen swinging through the Canadian Tire Centre arena to get the crowd pumped up before games. A recognizable part of Ottawan society, Spartacat does his part as an active member of the community by visiting hospitals, schools, and children's hockey games. He has been involved in the "Read to Succeed" literacy drive that has been initiated by the Ottawa Senators to educate children on the importance of reading. He participates by visiting schools in the Ottawa area to draw the attention of children to the literacy message.

=== Philadelphia Flyers ===
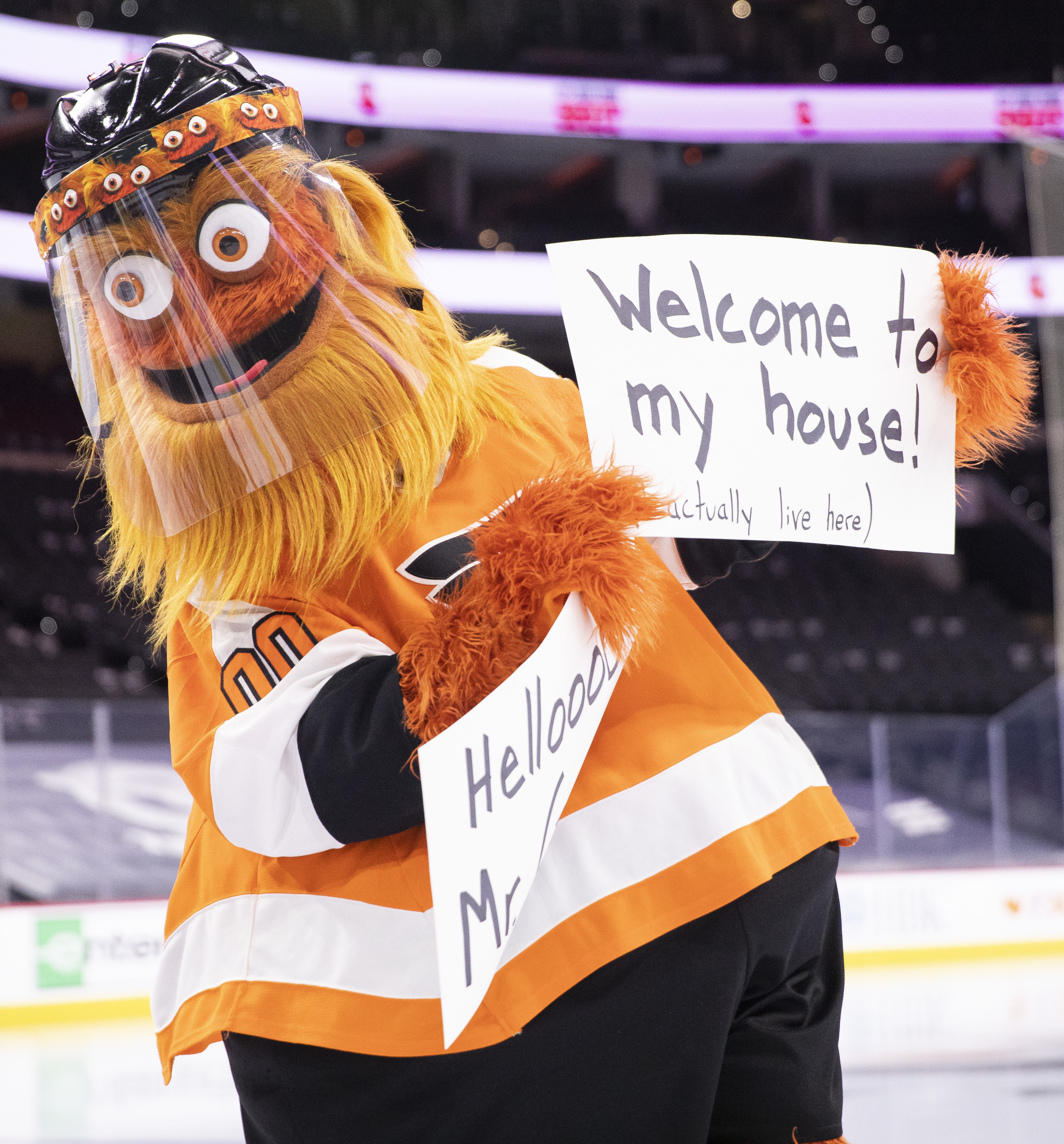
Gritty in 2021

The Philadelphia Flyers debuted a short-lived skating mascot named Slapshot from 1976 until 1977. It is the first mascot in Flyers' team history before Gritty was introduced at Please Touch Museum on September 24, 2018.

Gritty is the Philadelphia Flyers' second mascot after Slapshot. He was unveiled to the public on September 24, 2018. He is a 7-foot tall fuzzy orange creature.

=== Pittsburgh Penguins ===
Pete was the Pittsburgh Penguins' primary mascot. He was an Ecuadorian-born penguin on loan from the Pittsburgh Zoo. Pete made his first appearance during the second intermission of a game against the Boston Bruins on October 19, 1968. He later died of pneumonia one month into the season. It is believed that his death was due to the ice crew at the arena keeping his nesting area too warm. A second penguin mascot was loaned to the team and made it through the 1971–72 season.

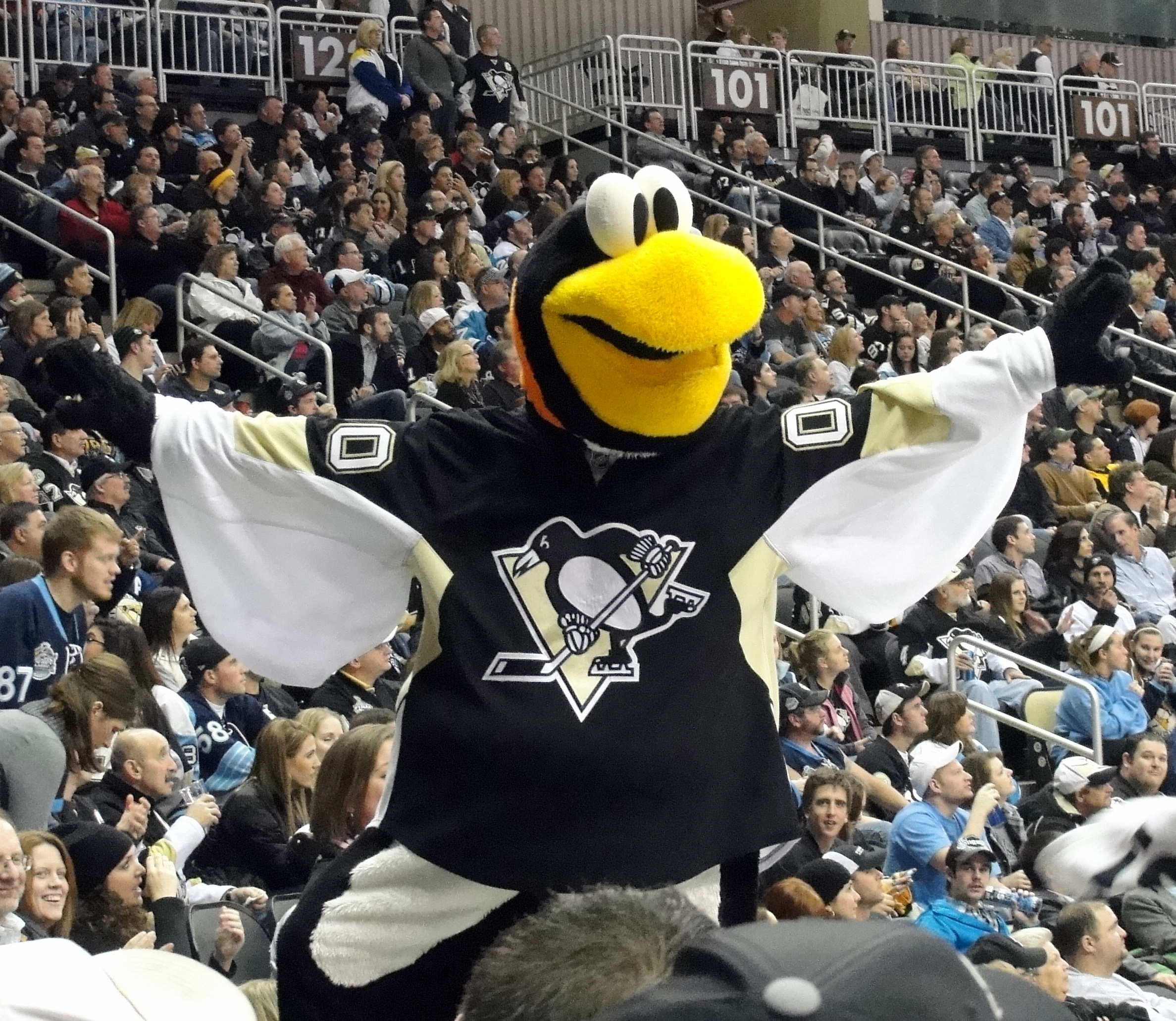
Iceburgh in 2011

Iceburgh is the official penguin-suited mascot of the Pittsburgh Penguins, resembling a King Penguin. He debuted for the 1992–93 NHL season. Iceburgh was known as "Icey" in the 1995 film Sudden Death starring Jean-Claude Van Damme, filmed at the Pittsburgh Civic Arena. In the movie, the Iceburgh costume was worn by Faith Minton. The name Iceburgh is a play on the words "iceberg" and Pittsburgh. He usually wears a Penguins jersey with the number "00".

=== San Jose Sharks ===
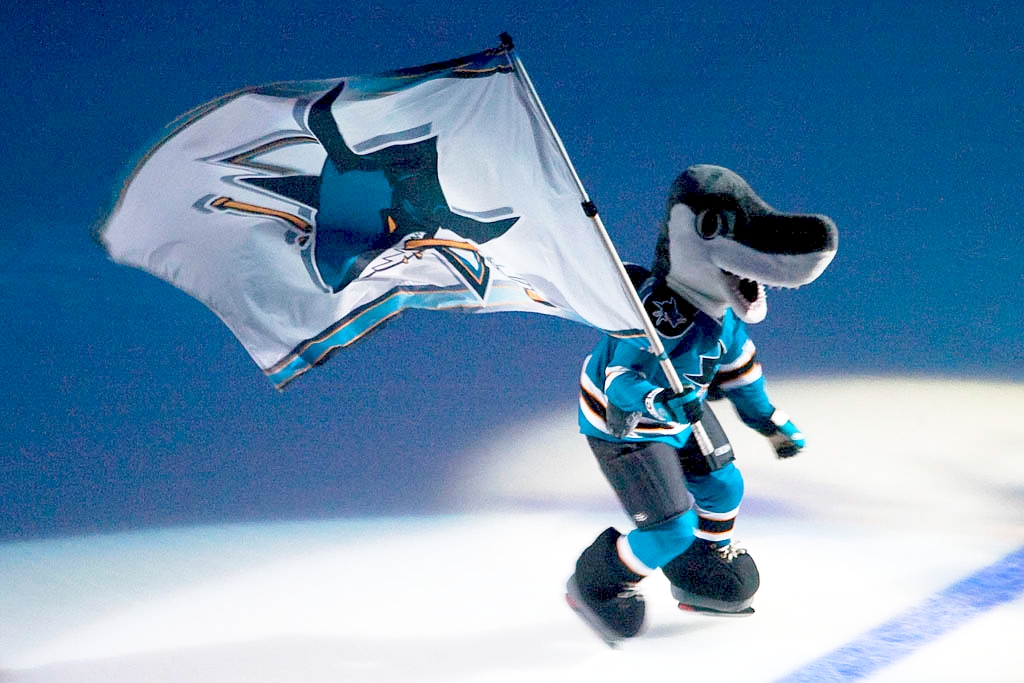
S.J. Sharkie in 2007

S.J. Sharkie, an anthropomorphic shark, is the mascot of the San Jose Sharks. He debuted in January 1992.

On March 12, 1999, S.J. Sharkie was involved an incident during the pre-game festivities for that evening's Sharks vs. Red Wings game. During an attempted rappel from the rafters of SAP Center at San Jose (then known as San Jose Arena), Sharkie's jersey became entangled in the rope and rappel equipment, leaving Sharkie hanging approximately 40 feet above the ice. Sharkie remained there while the starting lineups were announced and during the singing of the national anthem. The beginning of the game was delayed 20 minutes while crews worked to rescue him. He was eventually hoisted upward to a catwalk using a secondary rope.

=== Seattle Kraken ===
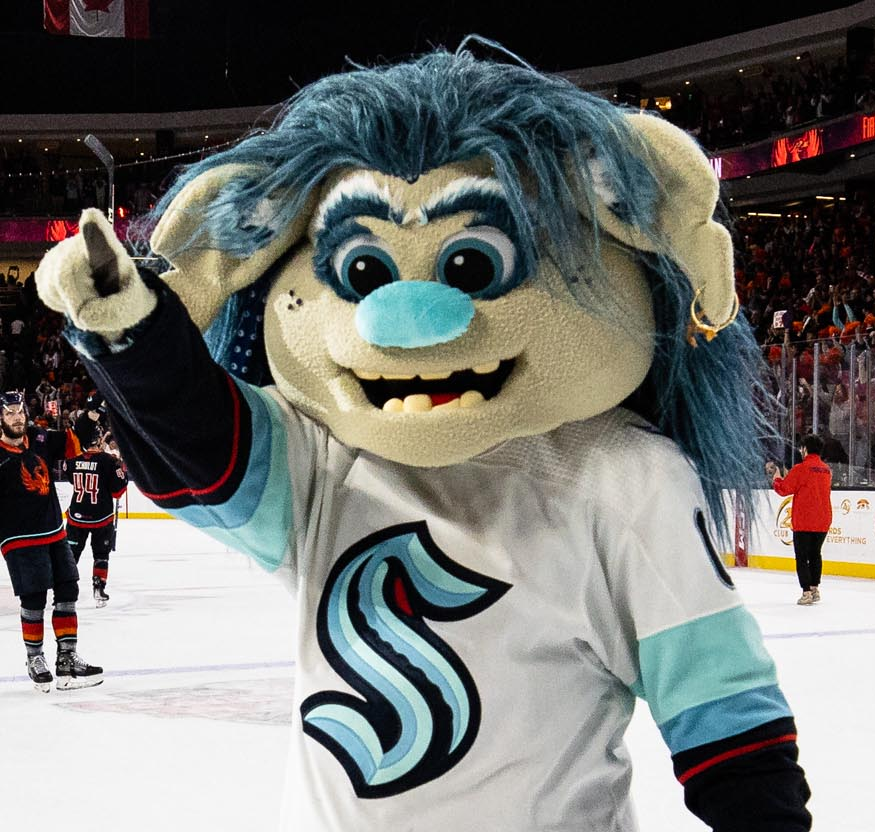
Buoy in 2023

Buoy is a 6-foot-tall, furry, blue troll and the mascot of the Seattle Kraken. His backstory is that he is the nephew of the Fremont Troll, a famous sculpture in Seattle. The team explained they did not want to use a kraken as a mascot, saying that nobody knows what a kraken looks like. They also didn't want to use an octopus because that belongs to the Detroit Red Wings. The process of finding a mascot took two years, since around the time the team unveiled their name in July 2020.

Buoy made his anticipated debut before a pre-season game against the Vancouver Canucks on October 1, 2022. Prior to this date, Buoy's initial debut date was Christmas 2021, but was postponed due to the COVID-19 pandemic.

=== St. Louis Blues ===
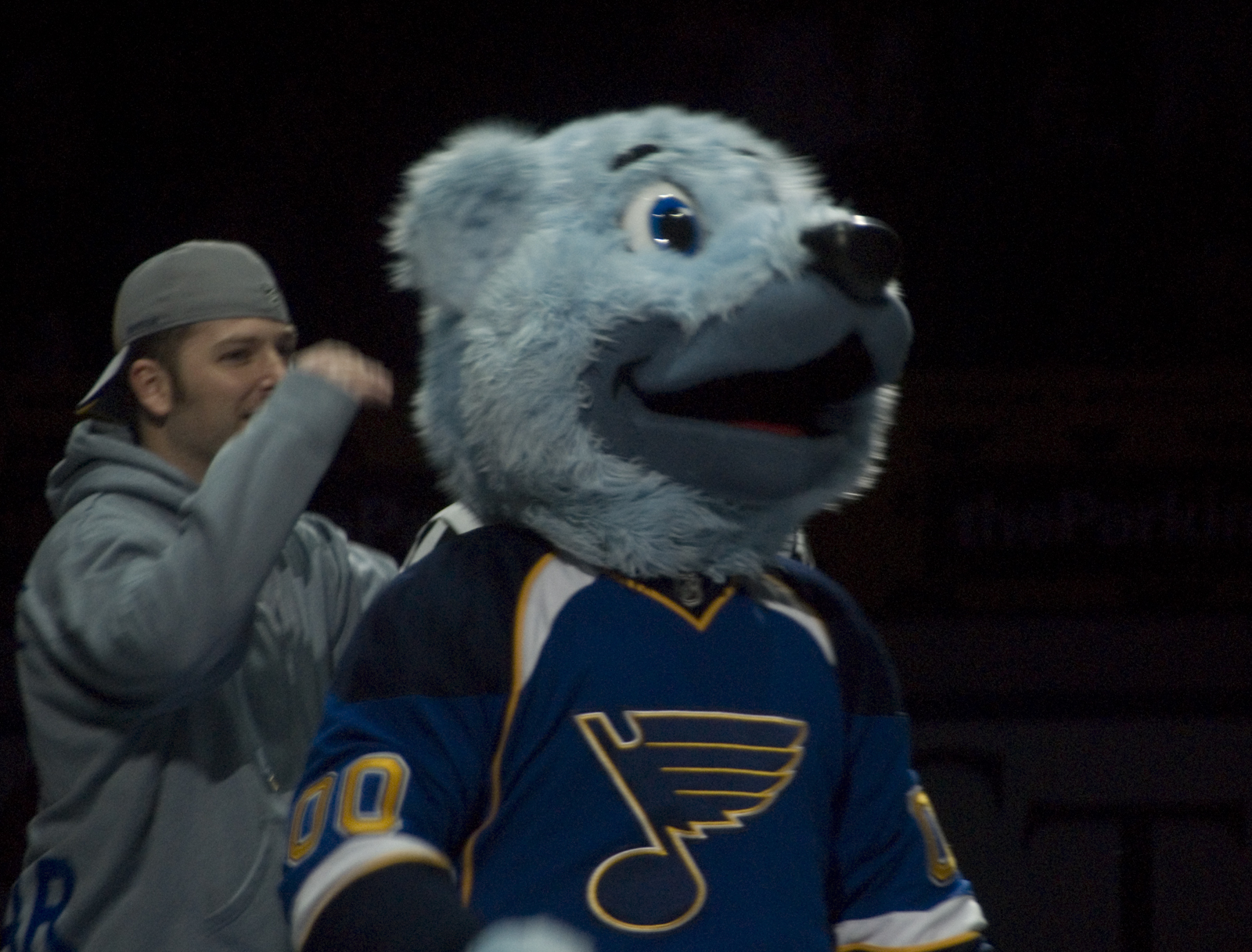
Louie in 2011

Louie is the current mascot of the St. Louis Blues. He was introduced on October 10, 2007, and on November 3, 2007, when the fans voted on the name on the Blues website. Louie is a blue-furred polar bear and wears a Blues jersey with his name on the back. Louie has earned the unofficial nickname "Victory Dog", because of his generic mascot animal appearance.

=== Tampa Bay Lightning ===
Thunderbug is the mascot of the Tampa Bay Lightning. He is a black and yellow Lightning Bug and wears a jersey with the number 00. He plays a bass drum to simulate a thunderclap. Thunderbug leads the pre-game ritual by accompanying Thunderstruck by AC/DC with his drum. During the game he usually walks around the stands launching T-shirts to fans and providing a bass rhythm during organized cheers and chants.

A video of the Thunderbug spraying a fan of the Boston Bruins with silly string went viral in 2012; less than a week later, a local television station confirmed the female performer was let go, but not exclusively for this incident.

=== Toronto Maple Leafs ===
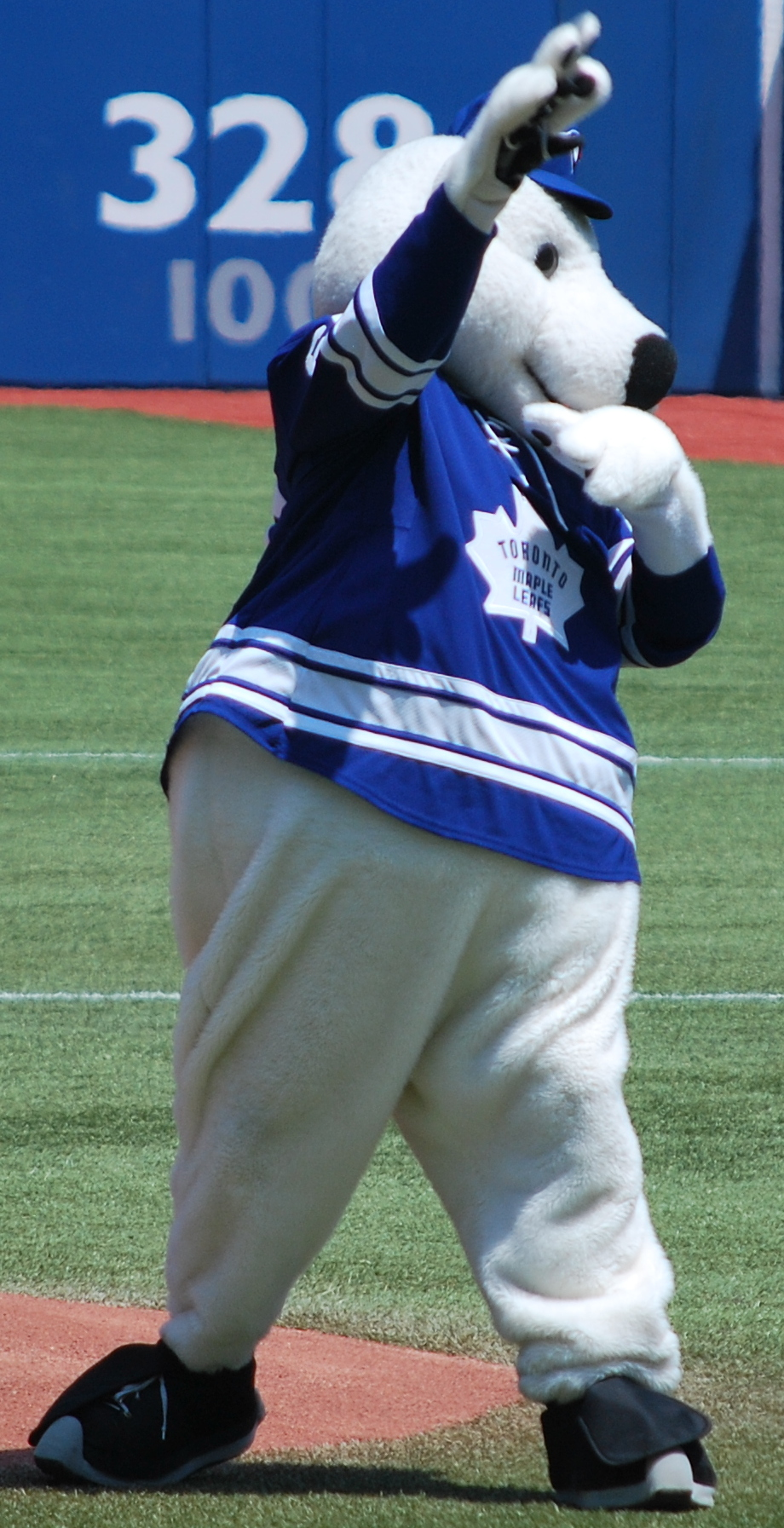
Carlton throwing the ceremonial first pitch at a 2013 Toronto Blue Jays game

Carlton is a 6'4" bipedal polar bear, and the official mascot of the Toronto Maple Leafs. His first public appearance was on October 10, 1995, at the Leafs' home-opener in Toronto against the New York Islanders.

Carlton's name and number (#60) comes from the location of Maple Leaf Gardens, 60 Carlton Street in Toronto, the Leafs home arena from 1931 to 1999. They have since moved to Scotiabank Arena (formerly Air Canada Centre) on Bay Street. Since his debut, Carlton has gained fame through appearances at Leafs home games. He has also occasionally travelled with the team, having made appearances at 20 different arenas in 17 cities over his career. To date, Carlton has led various cheers and spread Maple Leaf spirit to thousands of fans. Carlton is also credited with chairing the first annual Mascot Summit in 2000, which took place at the 50th National Hockey League All-Star Game in Toronto.

Reports of Carlton's retirement were circulated in November 2009, however the Maple Leafs, speaking through their mascot, stated that the report was false. Due to his dedicated service, he is scheduled to pass former Maple Leafs legend George Armstrong for the most Maple Leafs games all-time during the 2023–24 season.

Carlton also appears at games for the Leafs' AHL affiliate, the Toronto Marlies.

=== Utah Mammoth ===
Utah Mammoth reveal new mascot, “Tusky”

Shortly before the 2024–25 NHL season, Utah Mammoth (then known as the Utah Hockey Club) announced that Jazz Bear from the NBA's Utah Jazz would also serve as their temporary mascot for their inaugural season, ahead of their permanent mascot's reveal the following season. They also have a black lab named Archie. During the 2025 home opener on October 15, the team unveiled Tusky, a bipedal blue-furred Columbian mammoth.

=== Vancouver Canucks ===
Prankster Bear was the former mascot of the Vancouver Canucks, he was a polar bear similar to Carlton the Bear from the Toronto Maple Leafs. He only lasted for the 1990–91 season.

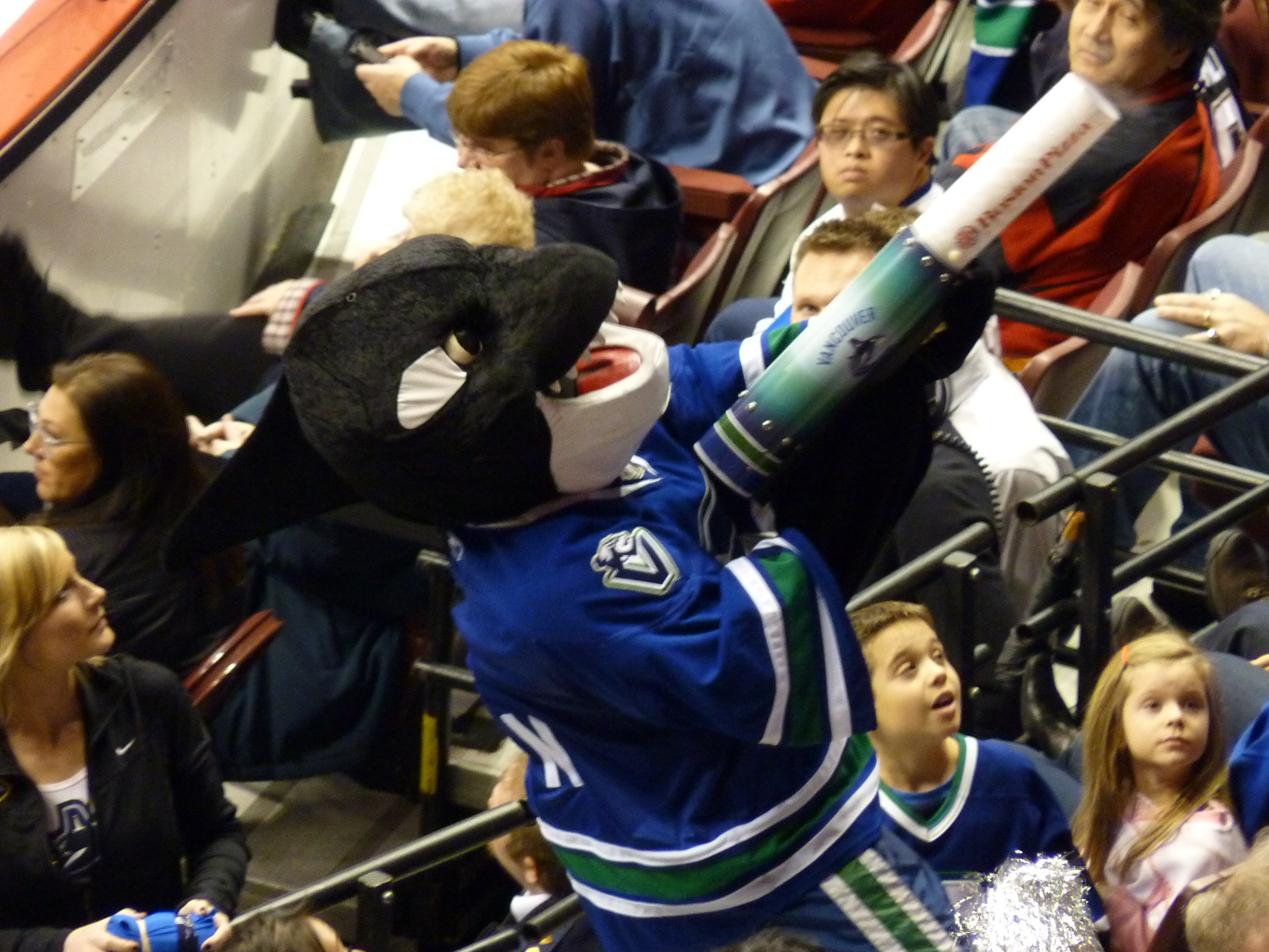
Fin firing a T-shirt cannon in 2009

Fin is the mascot of the Vancouver Canucks. He is an anthropomorphic orca that debuted during the 2001–2002 Season. Fin is usually hanging around the Canucks, proudly beating his drum at every Canucks hockey game. His trademark move consists of steam emitting from his blowhole and his "chomping" of unsuspecting heads at Rogers Arena. Fin is one of the few NHL mascots who plays the position of a goaltender. He is 6'3 and shoots left.

Fin is very affectionate towards children, having been a regular at Canuck Place, a hospice in Vancouver for terminally ill children run by the team.

He is also featured in a series of animated shorts that play during games, produced by Vancouver animation studio Slap Happy Cartoons. His underwater home is known as Fin's Place, in the Georgia Strait.

=== Vegas Golden Knights ===
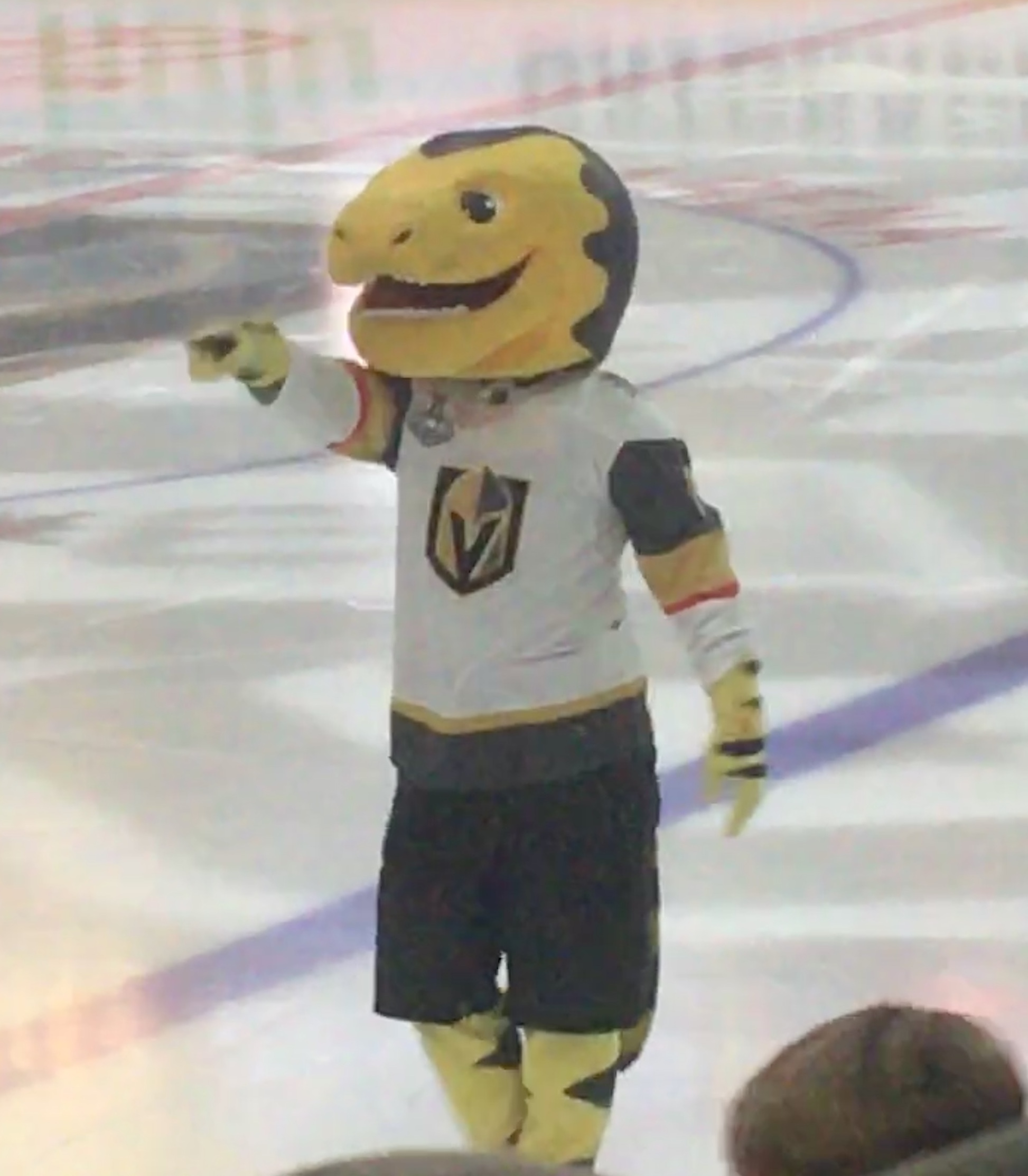
Chance in 2018

Chance is a bipedal gila monster and mascot for the Vegas Golden Knights. He was unveiled on October 13, 2017. According to the Golden Knights' website, "Chance emerged from his underground burrow at Red Rock Canyon and made his way to City National Arena in Summerlin to see what all the excitement was about. Once there, he learned how welcoming the hockey community is. Despite being shy and not knowing anyone at the rink, he was invited to come onto the ice and skate. Like many newcomers to the sport, he fell in love with hockey and the Golden Knights." and "Chance represents the inclusive culture of hockey. Everyone is welcome. He demonstrates how important life skills can be developed by playing hockey, such as strong character, dedication, fitness and teamwork. Like the city of Las Vegas, he is strong."

=== Washington Capitals ===
Winger was the first mascot of the Washington Capitals, was their first before switching to the current mascot Slapshot.

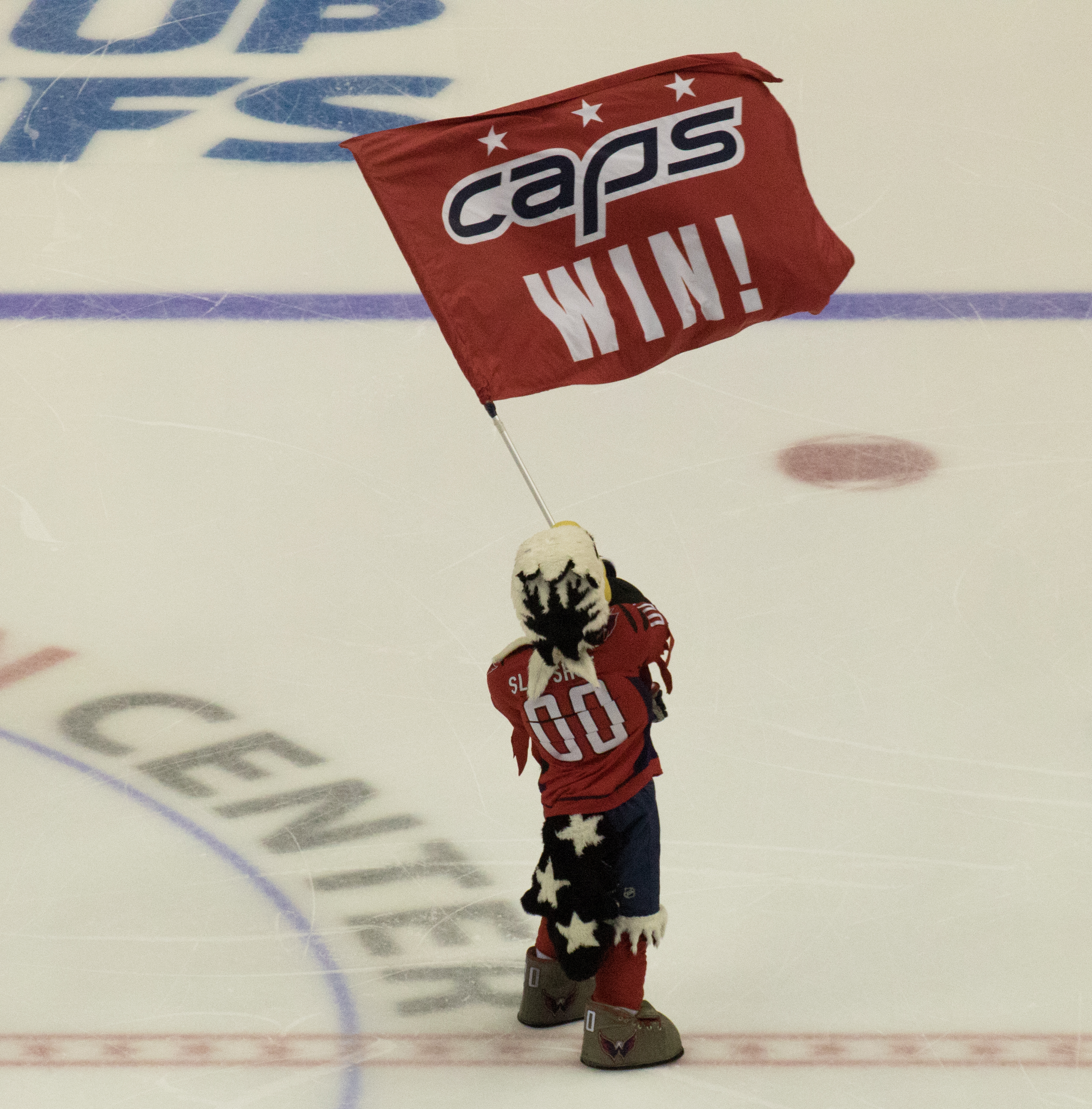
Slapshot in 2017 after a playoff game victory

Slapshot is the official mascot of the Washington Capitals. He is a large bald eagle who wears the jersey number 00. He was officially unveiled on November 17, 1995, and is frequently accompanied at home games by secondary mascots, Air Slapshot and Hat Trick.

=== Winnipeg Jets ===
Mick E. Moose is the mascot of the Winnipeg Jets, as well as their AHL affiliate, the Manitoba Moose. Mick debuted in 1994 for the International Hockey League's Minnesota Moose. Since 1996, he has been the mascot for the IHL/AHL Manitoba Moose, except from 2011 to 2015, when the team played in St. John's as the St. John's IceCaps. The Jets recalled Mick E. Moose from the AHL in 2011 after deciding that "Ultimately, the fact that Mick E. Moose seemed to connect and resonate with so many of our young fans over the past 15 seasons kept bringing us back to our history and the possibility of retaining him as our mascot.". Mick was introduced as the Jets' new mascot on October 7, 2011. Mick is a brown moose, with two large antlers and wears a blue home jersey and a flying helmet. At NHL events like the All-Star Game, he is known simply as “Moose.”

Benny is the 2nd Mascot of the Winnipeg Jets, In the 2016 Heritage Classic, the current Jets resurrected their mascot from its original incarnation, Benny, and has since served as the team's secondary mascot.

== Past teams ==
=== Arizona Coyotes ===
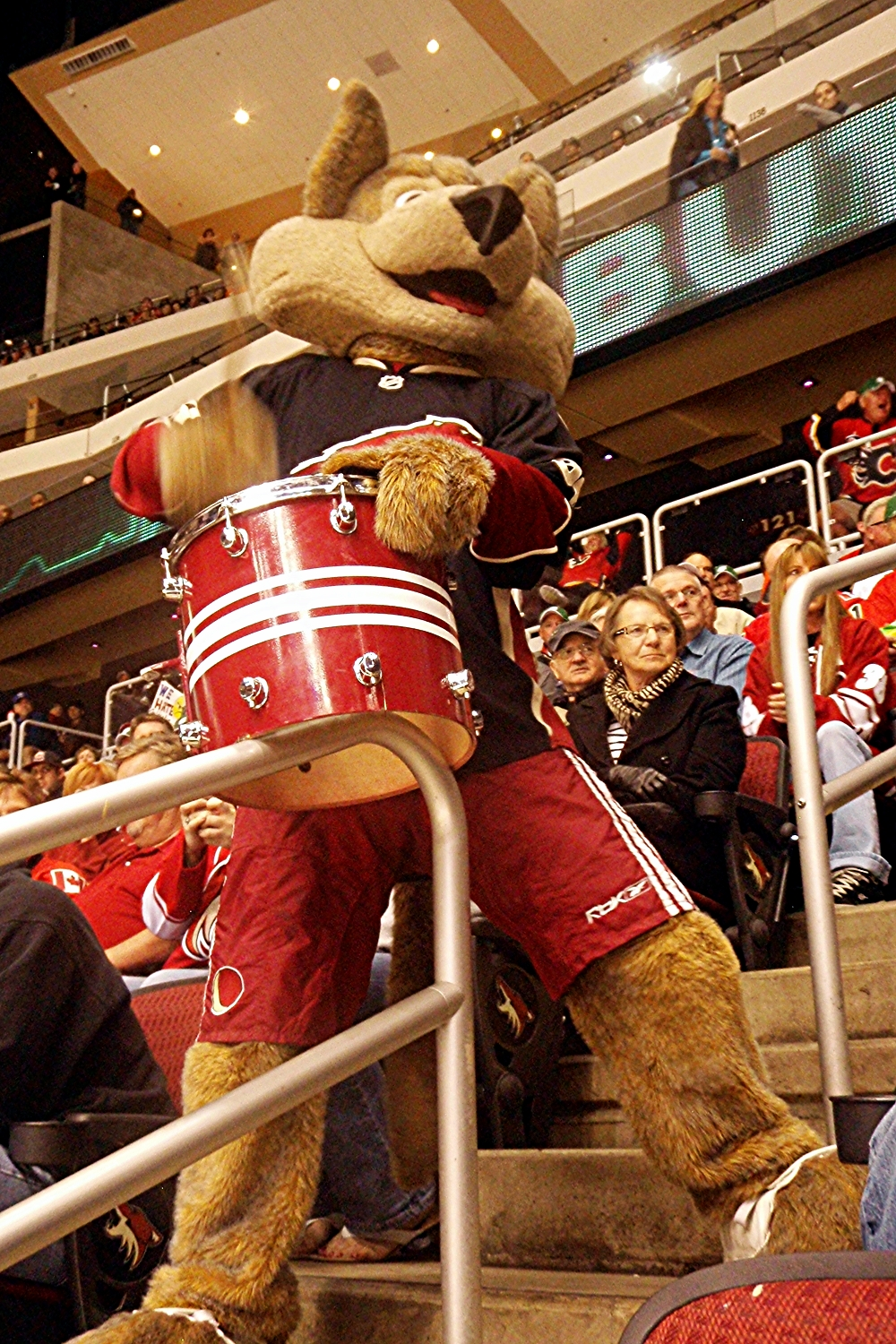
Howler in 2011

Howler the Coyote has been the coyote-suited mascot of the Arizona Coyotes. He was introduced on October 15, 2005. Howler wore number 96 on his jersey, representing the year the Winnipeg Jets moved to Arizona, and he also wore a "M" Designation for Mascot. He has been known to beat on a bucket to encourage the fans to cheer, and had many different outfits in games. He was also an outstanding drummer entertaining Coyotes fans around the Phoenix area by joining in with many of the local bands when he appeared at the many charity events he and the Coyotes Foundation attended.

=== Atlanta Thrashers ===
Thrash was the mascot of the Atlanta Thrashers. He was a 6'3" Georgia brown thrasher who debuted on October 2, 1999. Thrash was retired after the team moved to Winnipeg to become the current Winnipeg Jets in 2011.

=== Hartford Whalers ===
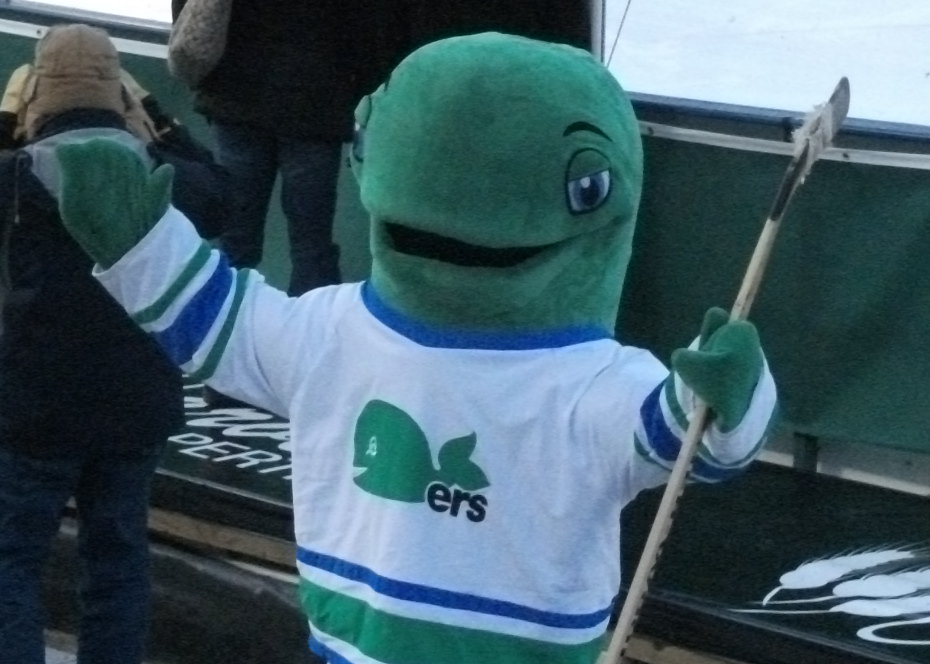
Pucky in 2011

Wally was the Hartford Whalers only physical mascot. He appeared starting at the 1991–92 season, but disappeared after that year. Hartford attendance was at its worst at this point after the Ron Francis trade. Wally wore a fisherman's rain coat with a sailing shirt and his hat had the Hartford Whalers logo on it. It looked like a cartoon version of the Gorton's Fisherman. Pucky was the mascot of the Hartford Whalers. Pucky was never an actual anthropomorphic mascot. He was the highly regarded pictogram of the Whalers name and shoulder patch on the original WHA New England Whalers uniform, and then NHL Hartford. His silhouette was also used as the entry to the Whalers' Gift Shop. He was brought to life to be the Connecticut Whale mascot in 2010 and was retired when the team reverted to the Hartford Wolf Pack identity in May 2013. He was a green anthropomorphic beluga whale who wore a whalers jersey with a picture of himself on the front. The women's Connecticut Whale also used a version of the Pucky logo on their jerseys. Beginning with the 2018–19 NHL season, Pucky has made appearances at the Carolina Hurricanes themed "Whalers Night" games to honor their franchise history originating with the Hartford Whalers

=== Quebec Nordiques ===
Badaboum was the mascot of the Quebec Nordiques. The mascot was a blue-furred otter. Badaboum emerged as the mascot for Rendez-vous '87 when Quebec City was chosen to host the NHL all-star festivities pitting the NHL All-stars against the Soviet national ice hockey team. Badaboum would later be adopted as the permanent mascot of the Nordiques until the team's relocation to Denver to become the Avalanche in 1995.

=== Winnipeg Jets (1972–1996) ===
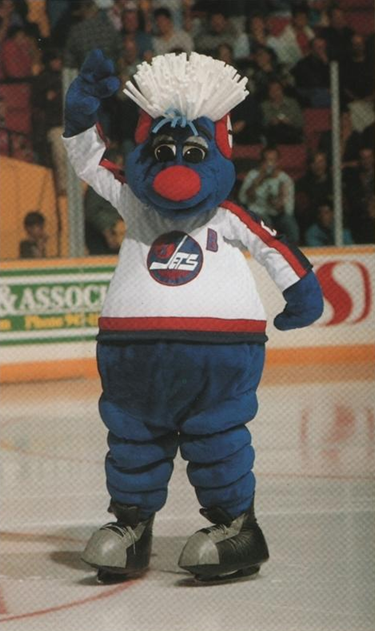
Benny the mascot was introduced on October 9, 1986 for the Winnipeg Jets.

Benny was the mascot of the original Winnipeg Jets from 1986 to 1996. He was named in honor of both Ben Hatskin, the first owner of the Jets, and Elton John's hit song "Bennie and the Jets." He wore a B on the front of his jersey, in the spot where a C for captain or A for alternate captain would otherwise go. He has since reemerged as a secondary mascot for the current Winnipeg Jets, beginning with the 2016 Heritage Classic.

== See also ==
- List of mascots
- NHL cheerleading
