= UBS Tower (Nashville) =

Skyscraper in Nashville, Tennessee

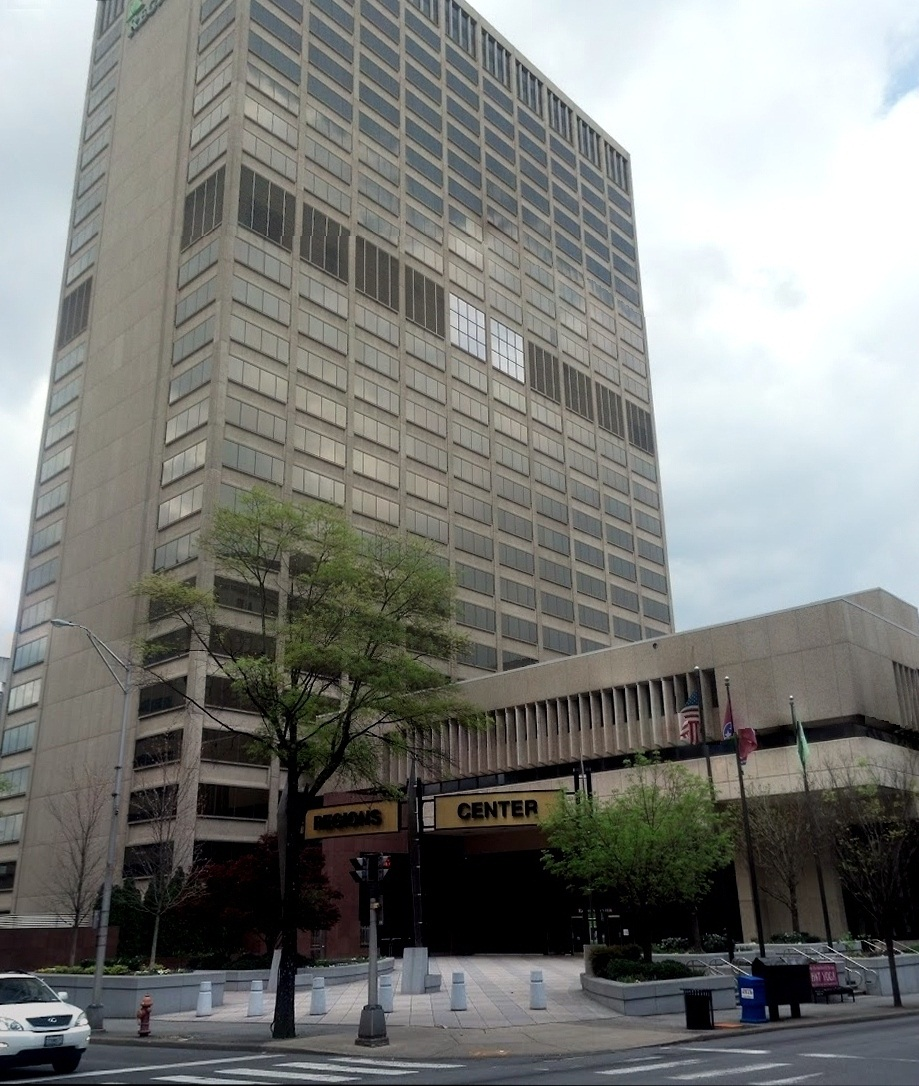
- Interactive map of the UBS Tower area

General information
- Type: office
- Architectural style: International Style
- Location: 315 Deaderick Street; Nashville, Tennessee; United States
- Coordinates: 36.1659°N 86.7796°W
- Completed: 1974

Height
- Roof: 354 ft (108 m)

Technical details
- Floor count: 28
- Floor area: 602,348 sq ft (55,960.0 m^{2})

UBS Tower is a 108-meter (354-foot), 28-story skyscraper at 315 Deaderick Street in Nashville, Tennessee.

The tower was completed in 1974. It was originally called the First American Center but the name was changed when First American National Bank merged with AmSouth Bank. A major renovation of the building's ground-level exterior followed the name change. The name then changed again to Regions Center when AmSouth merged with Regions. It is the former Tennessee headquarters of Regions Financial Corporation. Regions moved in 2013 but still leases 250,000 square feet of space in the building. Currently the Swiss Banking behemoth UBS has leased 138,000 square feet of the building in an effort to move back office jobs from southeast Nashville to downtown Nashville. This deal expires in 2034. The name of the building was renamed from Regions Center to UBS Tower.

The building served as the Tennessee headquarters and a branch office for Birmingham, Alabama-based Regions Bank. It is also home to many non-related businesses who lease space in the upper floors. It was once the main office and headquarters of First American National Bank. AmSouth acquired the slightly larger First American National Corporation in 2000 after the latter involved itself in several unprofitable mergers. On May 25, 2006, AmSouth announced it would be merging with Regions Financial. Regions announced its move to One Nashville Place in late September 2012.

The tower has a parking garage. Its entrance is located on Fourth Avenue North.

== History ==
The site received national attention in 1971 when remains of a saber-toothed cat were discovered during excavation of the property. A number of noted archaeologists visited the site following its initial discovery, including Ronald Spores, Kent Flannery, Vance Haynes, and Edwin Williamson. John Guilday of the Carnegie Museum of Natural History conducted an examination of all faunal material recovered from the site, and published the results in the July 1977 issue of the Journal of the Tennessee Academy of Sciences. Although Guilday may have conducted an inventory of the human remains from the site, none was ever published.

Radiocarbon analysis of human remains from the cave returned dates of 2390+/-145 B.P. and 1690+/-115 B.P. These remains were collected from an upper zone approximately 16-feet above the saber-tooth bones. The human remains are believed to be from the Woodland Period and originated thousands of years after the Smilodon find. According to Guilday (1977), collagen from the Smilodon remains returned radiocarbon dates of 9410+/-155 B.P. and 10,035+/-650 B.P. These dates are extremely late for the presence of Smilodon in the Southeast, both contemporaneous with the Dalton horizon and overlapping Paleoindian occupations along the Cumberland River by at least 1,000 years. As such, the dates for the Smilodon remains from the First American site should be regarded with some skepticism.

As a result of interest that the site generated, First American Bank agreed to engineer around the small percentage of cave deposits that had not been destroyed. These deposits were vaulted over using steel and concrete, and preserved in an artificial cavern beneath the lowest parking garage level. An access hatch and ladder provided entry to the space. Newspaper and magazine articles from the early- to mid-1970s show there was clear interest among the archaeological community in conducting further excavations in what remained of the cave. In 1973 Time Magazine reported that the bank was "preparing to let archaeologists resume their digging."

Unfortunately, it appears that any plans to conduct additional investigations were abandoned around the time bank construction was completed. The final reference to additional excavation occurs in 1976, when Bob Ferguson wrote that he was "certain much remains to be discovered when work resumes in the cavern, so thoughtfully preserved by the First American National Bank."

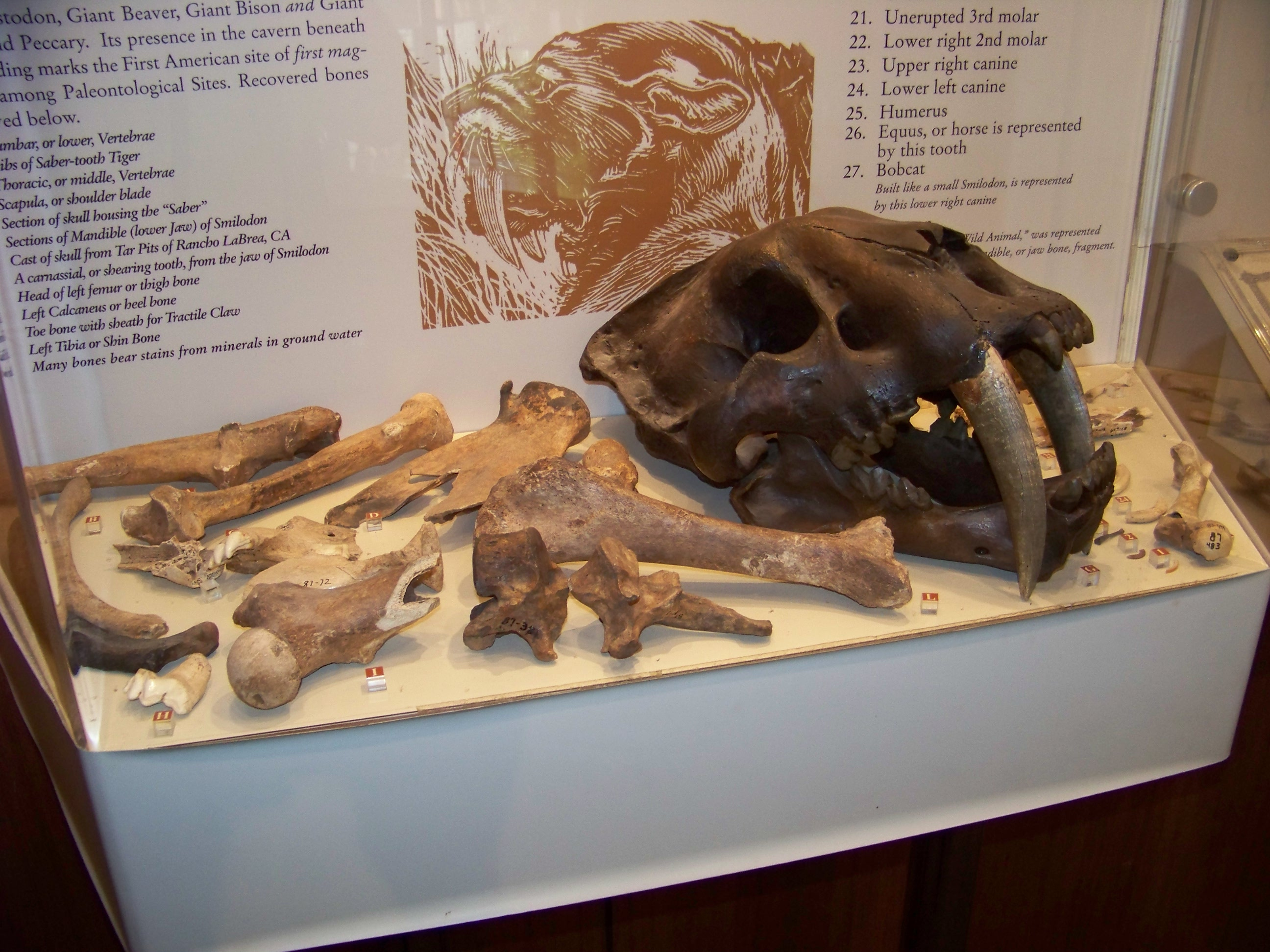
View of display case in the Regions Center lobby in 2008

In 1978, a group of cavers from the Nashville Grotto visited the site but were underwhelmed by the lack of intact cavern or open passages. The next documented entry into the cave did not occur until 2008, when archaeologists from the Tennessee Division of Archaeology revisited the site.

Regions Bank and UBS maintained a display in their first floor lobby that included bones from the Smilodon and other faunal material from the site. In 2016, the display was moved to Bridgestone Arena. Smilodon remains on display include portions of the lower jaw and molars, vertebral column, ribs, humerus, metacarpals, and metatarsals. A replica of a Smilodon skull from the La Brea Tar Pits serves as the centerpiece of the display. The Smilodon upper canine that led to the site discovery in 1971 is not on display, and is apparently no longer in the collection. Conventional wisdom among bank and facility management personnel is that the canine is now in the collection of the Smithsonian; however, that institution holds no record of the artifact.

The find of the Smilodon remains was the impetus for the logo of the Nashville Predators hockey team and their mascot Gnash. In the early years of the team's existence, a video was shown on the jumbotron of a computer-generated saber-toothed cat emerging from the ground beneath downtown Nashville before the team exited the locker room prior to each home game. The logo for AmSouth (as well as its predecessor, First American) was once prominently featured in the video but was digitally deleted when the bank dropped sponsorship of the team following the 2002-2003 NHL season.

== See also ==
- List of tallest buildings in Nashville
- List of archaeological sites in Tennessee
- Saber-toothed cat
