= AmSouth Bancorporation =

American banking company

- Industry: Finance and Insurance
- Founded: 1970; 56 years ago
- Defunct: November 4, 2006
- Fate: Merged with Regions Bank
- Successor: Regions Financial Corporation
- Headquarters: AmSouth Center; Birmingham, Alabama, U.S.
- Key people: C. Dowd Ritter (CEO)
- Products: Financial services
- Total assets: $54 billion (2006)
- Number of employees: 12,000 (2006)
- Website: amsouth.com (now defunct)

AmSouth Bancorporation was a banking company headquartered in Birmingham, Alabama, and operated for its final year in existence as a bank holding company (subsidiary) of Regions Financial Corporation after a merger between the two banks. AmSouth was previously known as First National Bank of Birmingham, which was first organized by Charles Linn in 1872. AmSouth was in the financial services industry and at its peak employed over twelve thousand people.

AmSouth's size more than doubled in 2000 when it absorbed Nashville, Tennessee-based First American National Bank. With the merger came hundreds of branches primarily in Tennessee but also in Kentucky, Virginia, and Mississippi. This is cited as a rare example of one bank absorbing another bank larger than itself. As part of the deal, AmSouth also acquired Deposit Guaranty Bank (which was operating as a subsidiary of First American). AmSouth was known for its low risk accounts through its specialty in Wealth Management, especially in its largest market of Birmingham, Alabama, where it started its specialty. Following AmSouth's merger with First American in 1999, the company expanded its Wealth Management reach into many of First American's markets such as Nashville, Tennessee.

== Merger with Regions Financial Corporation ==
On May 25, 2006, AmSouth announced it would merge with Regions Financial Corporation, another Birmingham-based bank, in a $10 billion deal.

A list of branches that will be divested for the merger to be approved was issued by the Department of Justice on October 19, 2006. The 39 branches divested in Alabama were sold to RBC Centura Bank and converted in Spring 2007.

On November 4, 2006, Regions completed its acquisition of AmSouth. AmSouth branches in Alabama, Florida, or Columbus, GA, either closed or converted to Regions on July 13, 2007. Branches in remaining states (except parts of Northwest Georgia) closed or converted on October 26, 2007. The branches in Northwest Georgia were converted on December 6, 2007, officially retiring the AmSouth name.
