= List of tallest buildings in Alabama =

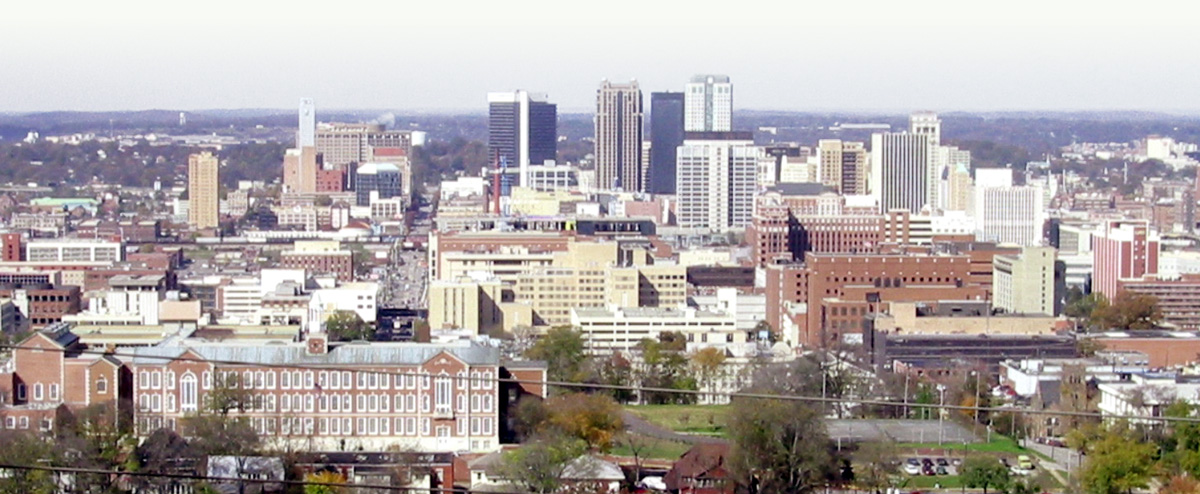
Birmingham, 3rd largest city and largest metropolitan area

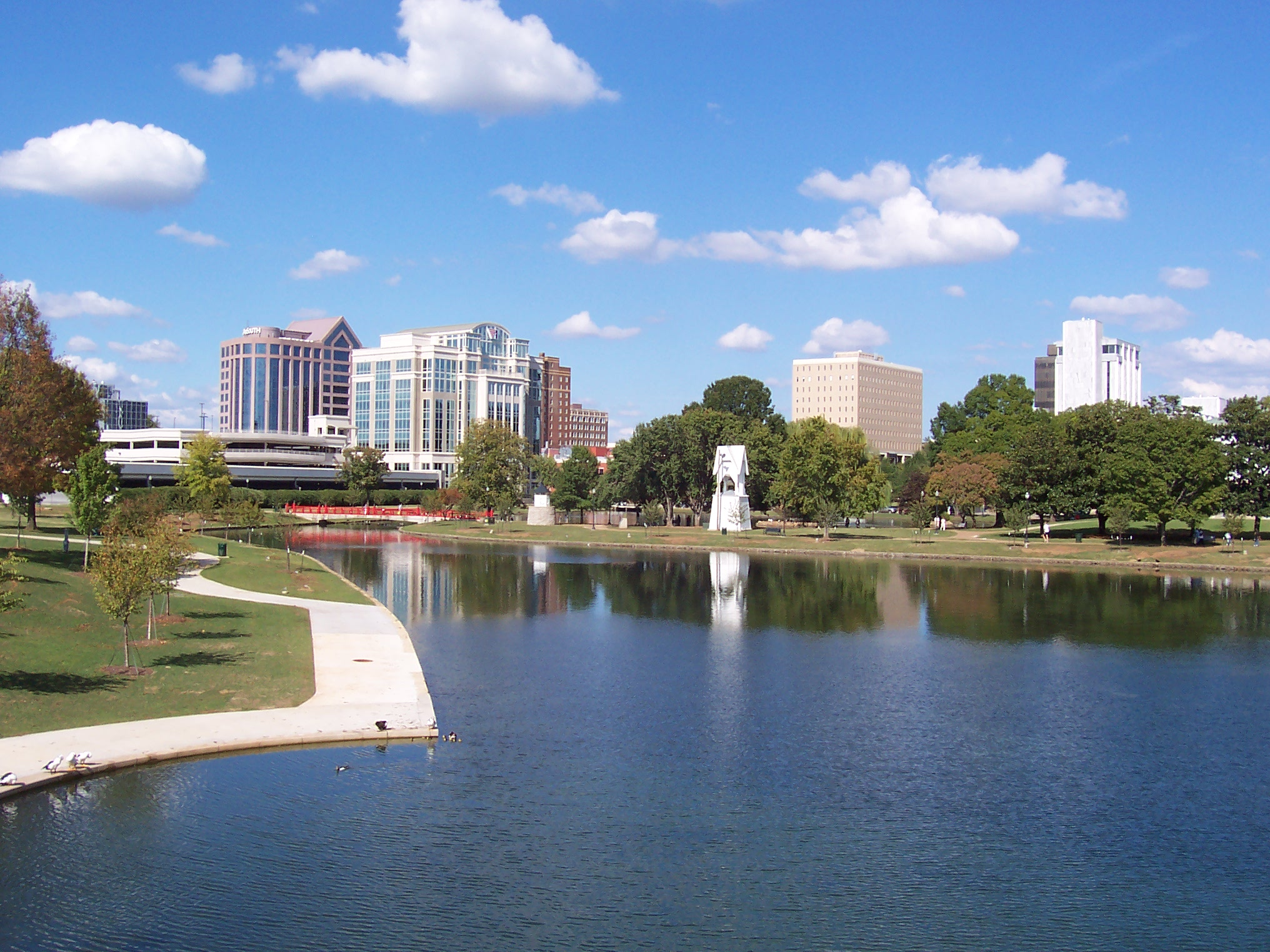
Huntsville, largest city and second largest metropolitan area

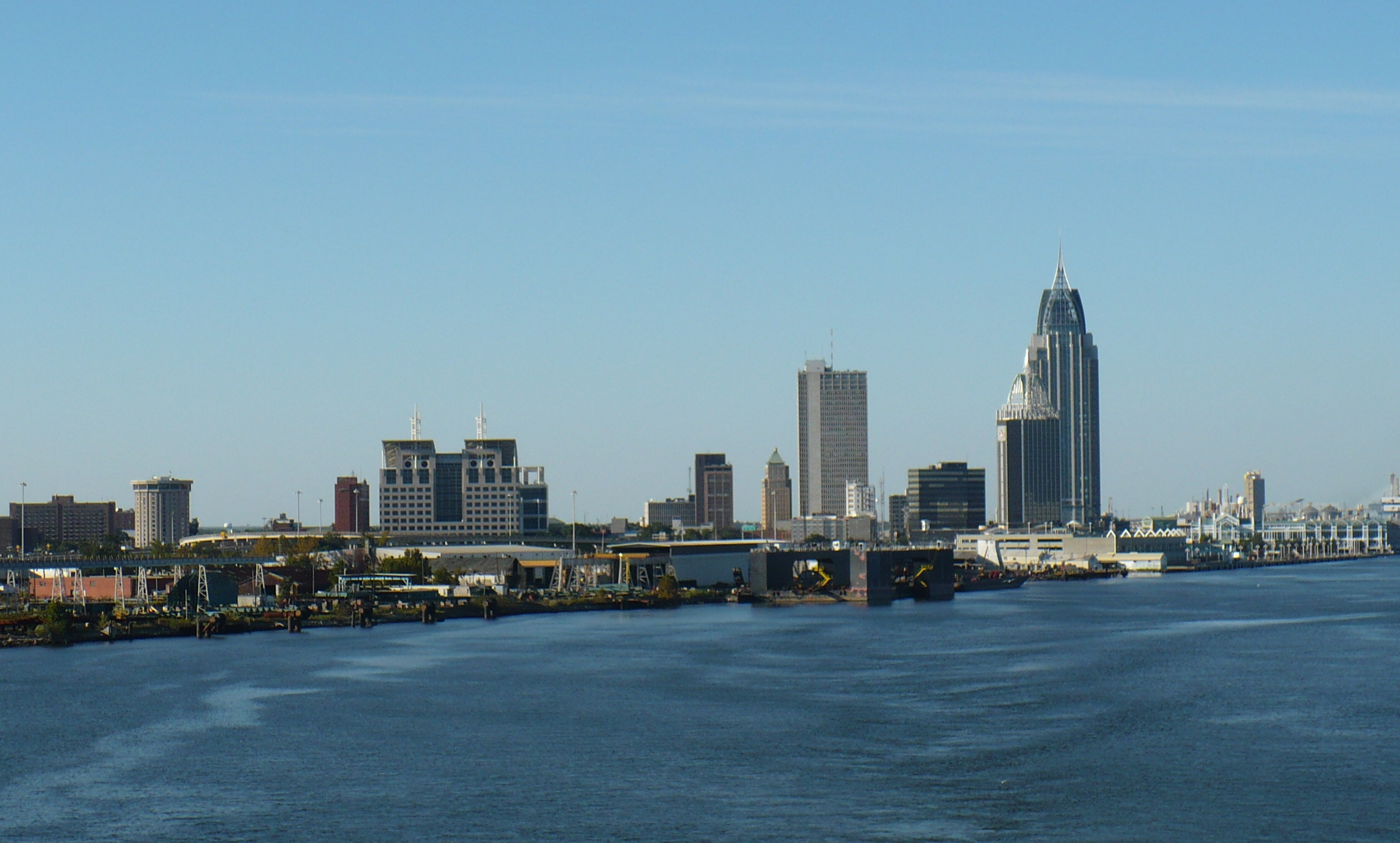
Mobile, third largest metropolitan area

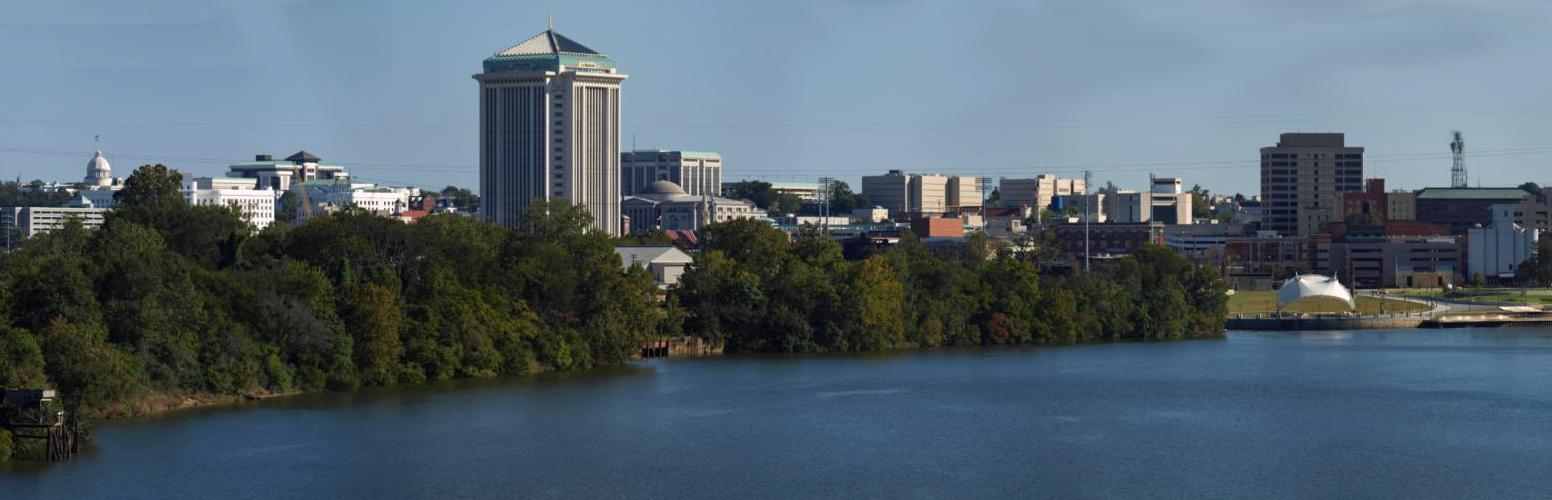
Montgomery, second largest city and fourth largest metropolitan area

Below is a table of the tallest buildings in the state of Alabama. The tallest building in the state is the RSA Battle House Tower, which was completed in 2007. The top 20 includes eight in Birmingham, five in Mobile, and four in Orange Beach.

== Tallest buildings ==
Rank	Name	Image	Height ft (m)	Floors	Year	City	Notes
1	RSA Battle House Tower		745 (227)	35	2007	Mobile	
2	Shipt Tower		454 (138)	34	1986	Birmingham	
3	Regions-Harbert Plaza		437 (133)	32	1989	Birmingham	
4	RSA Trustmark Building		424 (129)	34	1965	Mobile	
5	RSA Tower		397 (121)	22	1996	Montgomery	
6	AT&T City Center		391 (119)	30	1972	Birmingham	
7	Regions Center		390 (119)	30	1972	Birmingham	
8	Turquoise Place I		380 (115.7)	30	2009	Orange Beach	
9	Phoenix West II		379 (115.4)	31	2013	Orange Beach	
10	Renaissance Riverview Plaza Hotel		374 (114)	28	1983	Mobile	
11	Saturn V Dynamic Test Stand		374 (114)	31	1964	Huntsville	
12	Phoenix West I		350 (107)	27	2009	Orange Beach	
13	Mobile Marriott		326 (99)	20	1979	Mobile	
14	City Federal Building		325 (99)	27	1913	Birmingham	
15	Mobile Government Plaza		325 (99)	12	1994	Mobile	
16	Alabama Power Headquarters Building		321 (98)	18	1990	Birmingham	
17	Turquoise Place II		304 (93)	24	2008	Orange Beach	
18	Renaissance Tower		300 (92)	4	1991	Florence	
19	Thomas Jefferson Hotel		287 (87)	20	1929	Birmingham	
20	John Hand Building		284 (86)	20	1912	Birmingham	
21	Daniel Building		283 (86)	20	1970	Birmingham	
22	Two North Twentieth		273 (83)	17	1962	Birmingham	

The Poarch Band of Creek Indians own and operate two high rise hotels on tribal land in Alabama located in Wetumpka and Atmore. They are not included in this list despite the fact their height surpasses other listings.

== See also ==
- List of tallest buildings in Birmingham, Alabama
- List of tallest buildings in Mobile, Alabama
