= List of tallest buildings in Mobile =

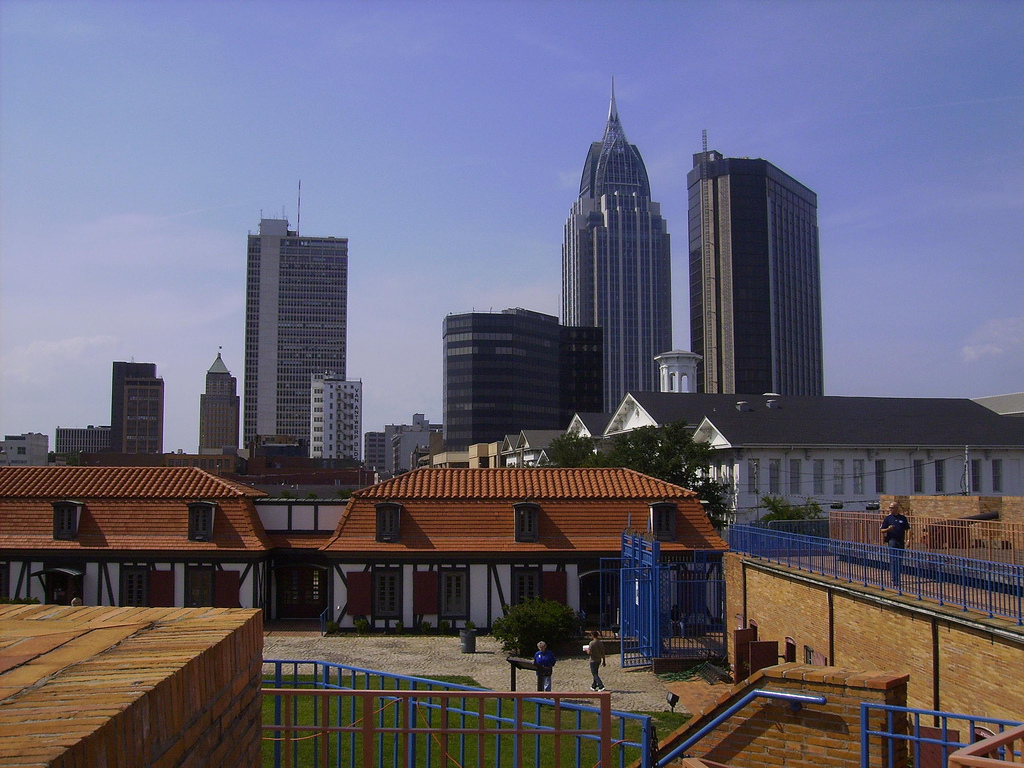
Skyline of Mobile from Fort Conde

The U.S. city of Mobile, Alabama is the site of 15 high-rises, all of which stand taller than 100 feet (30 m). The tallest building in the city is the 35-story RSA Battle House Tower, completed in 2007, which is 745 feet (227 m) tall. The tower is also the tallest building in the U.S. state of Alabama. Mobile's second-tallest skyscraper, the RSA Trustmark Building, rises 424 feet (129 m) and stood as the tallest structure in the city for over 40 years. Overall, four of the 10 tallest buildings in Alabama are located in Mobile. The city has more skyscrapers than any other city in Alabama besides Birmingham.

The history of high-rises in Mobile began with the completion of the 11-story Van Antwerp Building in 1907. The structure, often regarded as the first skyscraper in the city and the state, stood as the tallest building in the city until 1929, when the 236 feet (72 m) Regions Bank Building took its place. Upon its completion in 1965, the RSA Trustmark Building surpassed the height of the Regions Bank Building and became the tallest building in Alabama. It held this title until 1986, when the 454-foot (138 m) SouthTrust Tower was completed in Birmingham, but remained the tallest building in Mobile until the 2006 topping out of the RSA Battle House Tower.

As of August 2009, there are no high-rises under construction or proposed for construction in Mobile. A residential condominium project, Water Street Landing, was originally proposed in 2007 as a three-tower complex to be constructed on the Mobile River; the $45 million (USD) development was later canceled due to lack of funding. While the city of Mobile itself is not the location of any new high-rise developments, Orange Beach, a satellite city in the Mobile–Daphne–Fairhope combined statistical area, is the site of several construction proposals. One such proposal is the Mandalay Beach development, which includes two-twin residential towers that are planned to rise 374 feet (114 m) and 36 stories each.

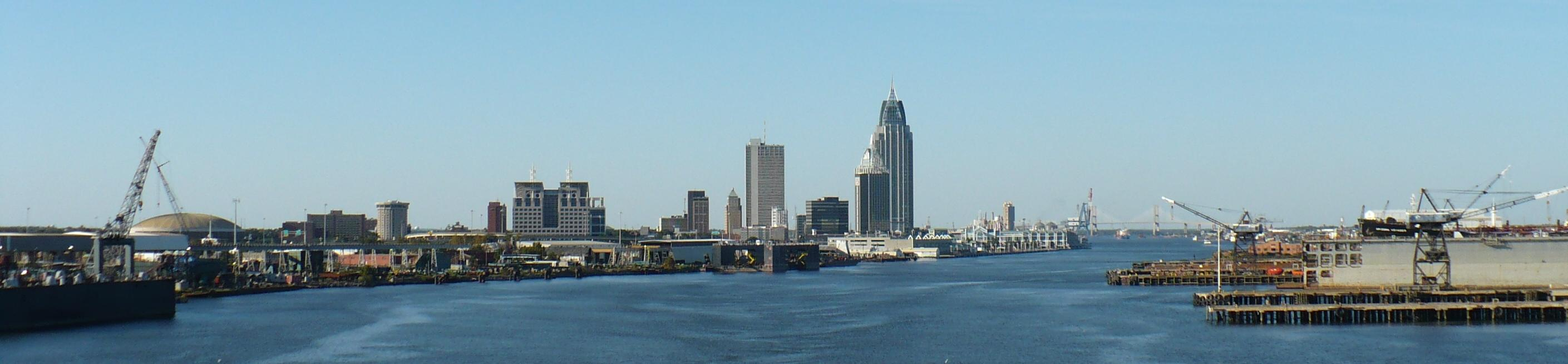
Panorama of Mobile's skyline from the Mobile River; high-rises present in the image are, from left to right, the Lafayette Plaza Hotel, Mobile Government Plaza, the Wachovia Building, the Regions Bank Building, the RSA Trustmark Building, the Van Antwerp Building, the Commerce Building, the Renaissance Riverview Plaza Hotel, and the RSA Battle House Tower

== Tallest buildings ==
This lists ranks Mobile high-rises that stand at least 100 feet (30 m) tall, based on standard height measurement. This includes spires and architectural details but does not include antenna masts. An equal sign (=) following a rank indicates the same height between two or more buildings. The "Year" column indicates the year in which a building was completed.

Rank	Name	Image	Height ft (m)	Floors	Year	Coordinates	Notes
1	RSA Battle House Tower	Distant ground-level view of a 40-story building with a square cross section; the tower has a mostly glass facade and has a light blue color. On the roof there is large, latticework structure that tapers into a spire.	745 (227)	35	2007	30°41′35.22″N 88°2′22.83″W	Has been the tallest building in Mobile and Alabama since its topping out in 2006; Tallest building on the Gulf Coast outside Houston
2	RSA Trustmark Building	A 34-story whitish office building stands against a largely clear sky. The tower is boxy and mostly windows interspersed with concrete.	424 (129)	34	1965	30°41′34.16″N 88°2′28.86″W	Tallest building in Alabama from 1965 to 1986.; 4th-tallest building in Alabama; Tallest building in Mobile from 1965 until 2007
3	Renaissance Riverview Plaza Hotel	Ground-level view of a 30-story building with a square cross section and a dark glass facade; on the roof there is large, white, latticework structure that tapers into a spire.	374 (114)	28	1983	30°41′30.24″N 88°2′22.19″W	Previously known as Adam's Mark Hotel; Tallest hotel in the city and the state; 9nd-tallest building in Alabama; The building previously had a structural height of 277 feet (84 m); a 2007 renovation increased the building's architectural height to 374 feet (114 m) with the addition of a spire.
4	Mobile Government Plaza	Ground-level view of a 12-story building and 9-story building, connected by an arched glass atrium; the facade is tan with dark blue glass windows. The roofline of the building is curved at several points, and two twin spires extend from the roof on the anterior side of the building.	325 (99)	12	1994	30°41′21.65″N 88°2′32.49″W	10th-tallest building in Alabama
5	Mobile Marriott	Ground-level view of a 20-story building with a tan stucco facade.	325 (99)	20	1979	30°40′33.66″N 88°7′6.17″W	
6	Regions Bank Building	Ground-level view of a 20-story building with a tan brick facade; the roof of the structure is a silver pyramid that tapers into a flagpole.	236 (72)^{[A]}	18	1929	30°41′35.01″N 88°2′31.68″W	Tallest building in Mobile from 1929 until 1965
7	Wachovia Building	Ground-level view of a 20-story building with a dark brown facade; a setback is present near the roofline of the building. Dark windows are visible on the anterior side of the structure.	230 (70)	16	1947	30°41′35.2″N 88°2′32.51″W	Also known as the Southtrust Bank Building
8	Holiday Inn - Mobile Downtown Historic District	Ground-level view of a 17-story building with a tan stucco facade.	180 (55)	17	1975	30°41′18.78″N 88°2′38.61″W	
9	USA Health Providence Hospital	Ground-level view of an 11-story hospital building with a white facade.	170 (52)	11	1987	30°40′45″N 88°11′56″W	
10	Commerce Building	Ground-level view of a 12-story building with a beige facade.	161 (49)	12	1958	30°41′40″N 88°2′29″W	
11	The Admiral Hotel	Ground-level view of a 12-story building with a red brick facade.	136 (41)	12	1940	30°41′20.47″N 88°2′35.6″W	
12	Van Antwerp Building	View of the Van Antwerp building	120 (37)	11	1907	30°41′31.9″N 88°2′27.32″W	Tallest building in Mobile from 1907 until 1929
13	Battle House Hotel	Ground-level view of a 10-story building with a square cross section; the anterior side has a brick facade, while the lateral side is composed of concrete and is windowless.	119 (36)	7	1908	30°41′34.83″N 88°2′27.53″W	
14	Royal St. Francis Building	Ground-level view of an 8-story building with a tan brick facade.	115 (35)	8	1908	30°41′35.82″N 88°2′29.04″W	
15	Cathedral Basilica of the Immaculate Conception	Ground-level view of church with an orange facade and a large portico; two twin bell towers extend from both sides of the building.	102 (31)	2	1850	30°41′24″N 88°02′45″W	Tallest building in Mobile from 1850 until 1907

== Timeline of tallest buildings ==
This table lists buildings that once held the title of tallest building in Mobile as well as the current titleholder, the RSA Battle House Tower.

Name	Image	Street address	Years as tallest	Height ft (m)	Floors	Coordinates	Reference
Cathedral Basilica of the Immaculate Conception	Black-and-white photograph of a large church with a portico; two twin bell towers extend from both sides of the building.	2 South Claiborne Street	1850–1907	102 (31)	2	30°41′24″N 88°02′45″W	
Van Antwerp Building	Ground-level view of a 10-story building with a rectangular cross section and a gray brick facade	103 Dauphin Street	1907–1929	120 (37)^{[A]}	11	30°41′31.9″N 88°2′27.32″W	
Regions Bank Building	Ground-level view of a 20-story building with a tan brick facade; the roof of the structure is a silver pyramid that tapers into a flagpole.	56 Saint Joseph Street	1929–1965	236 (72)^{[A]}	18	30°41′35.01″N 88°2′31.68″W	
RSA Trustmark Building	Distant ground-level view of a 35-story skyscraper with a rectangular cross section; the lateral side of the building has a concrete facade, whereas the anterior side has an almost complete glass facade that is light gray in color. A concrete shaft extends up the anterior side and projects beyond the roofline of the building. An antenna mast extends from the building's roof.	107 Saint Francis Street	1965–2006	424 (129)	34	30°41′34.16″N 88°2′28.86″W	
RSA Battle House Tower	Ground-level view of a 40-story skyscraper with a tan facade and dark blue windows; a partially visible spire extends from the building's roof.	11 North Water Street	2006–present	745 (227)	35	30°41′35.22″N 88°2′22.83″W	

== See also ==
- List of tallest buildings in Birmingham, Alabama

== Notes ==
A. ^ ^{a} ^{b} This height is an estimate based on a diagram of the Regions Bank Building; official height figures have not been released by this building's developer.
