= RSA Tower =

RSA Tower may refer to:

- RSA Battle House Tower, tallest building in Alabama (Mobile)
- RSA Trustmark Building, skyscraper in Mobile, Alabama
