= Renaissance Riverview Plaza Hotel =

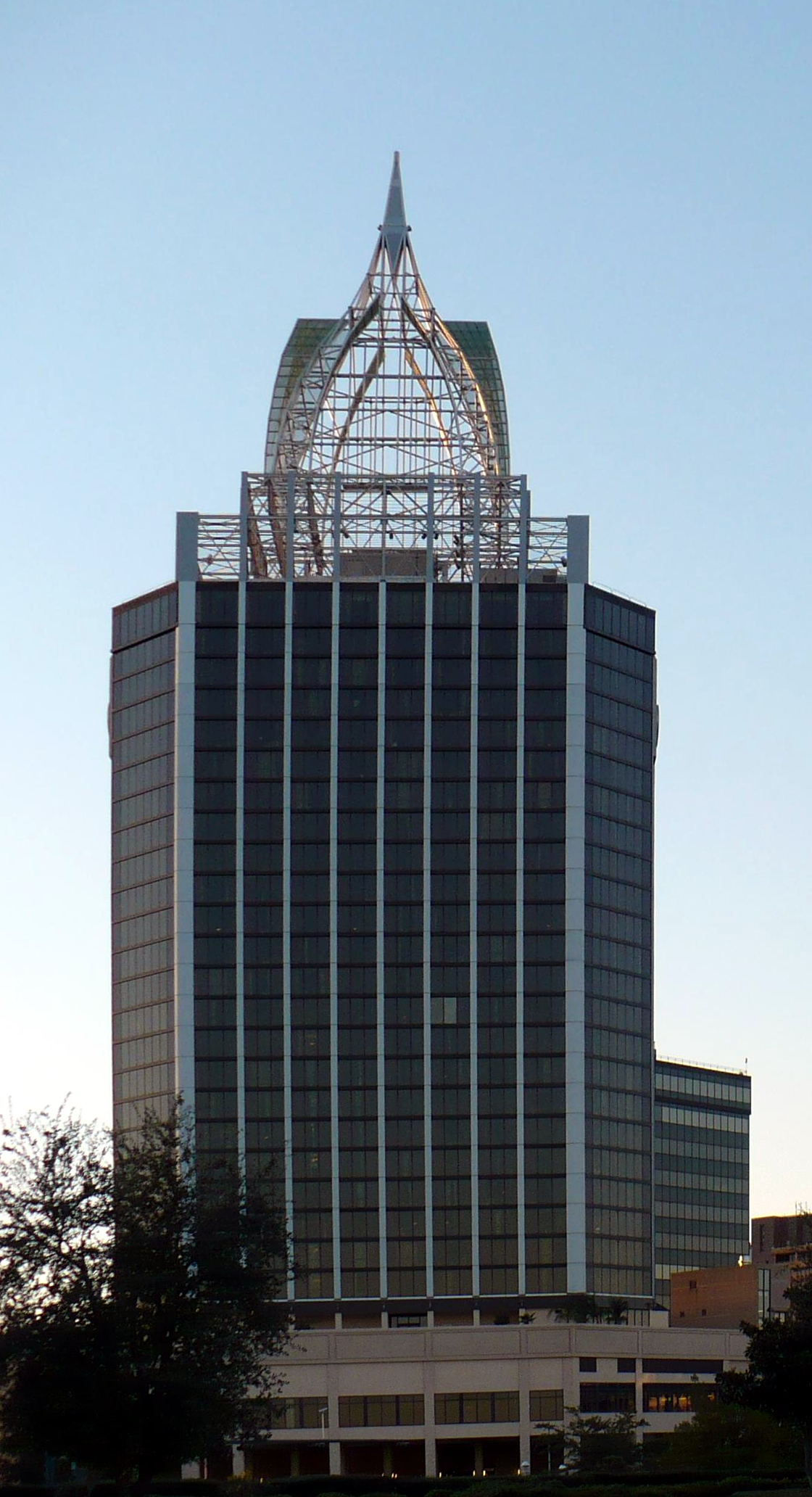
- The Renaissance Riverview Plaza Hotel has a spire designed after that of the RSA Battle House Tower.

- Location within Alabama

General information
- Status: Completed
- Type: Hotel
- Location: 64 South Water Street, Mobile, Alabama
- Coordinates: 30°41′30.24″N 88°2′22.19″W
- Completed: 1983
- Opening: 1983

Height
- Antenna spire: 374 feet (114 m)
- Roof: 277 feet (84 m)

Technical details
- Floor count: 28

Design and construction
- Architect: TAG Architects
- Developer: Adam's Mark

The Renaissance Riverview Plaza Hotel, formerly known as the Adam's Mark Hotel, is a high-rise hotel in the U.S. city of Mobile, Alabama. Completed in 1983, the building rises 277 feet (84 m) and 28 stories. The Renaissance Riverview Plaza Hotel is the third-tallest building and largest hotel in Mobile and the tallest hotel in the state of Alabama.

Upon its completion, the 374-foot (114 m) and 277-unit Stouffer's Hotel (later Adam's Mark Hotel) became the second-tallest hotel in Mobile, after the 325-foot (99 m) Mobile Marriott, and the third-tallest building in the city. The building later fell to fourth-tallest upon the 1994 completion of the 325-foot (99 m) City-County Administration Building. The building underwent a $5 million renovation (USD) in 2002, and in 2008 a large spire was constructed over the existing structure. The spire was designed to complement the spire of the RSA Battle House Tower; in shape and design, the two structures are nearly identical. With the addition of the spire, the Renaissance Riverview Plaza Hotel reached a new height of 374 feet (114 m), allowing it to surpass the Mobile Marriott and City-County Administration Building to become the third-tallest building in the city and the tallest hotel in the state.

== See also ==
- List of tallest buildings in Mobile, Alabama
