= List of tallest buildings in Birmingham, Alabama =

The United States city of Birmingham, Alabama is the site of 66 high-rises, all of which stand taller than 115 feet (35 m). The tallest building in the city is the 34-story Wells Fargo Tower, completed in 1986, which is 454 feet (138 m) tall. The tower was also the tallest building in the U.S. state of Alabama until the completion of the RSA Battle House Tower in Mobile in 2007. Birmingham's second-tallest skyscraper, the Regions-Harbert Plaza, rises 437 feet (133 m) and has stood as the second tallest structure in the city since its completion in 1989. Overall, five of the ten tallest buildings in Alabama are located in Birmingham.

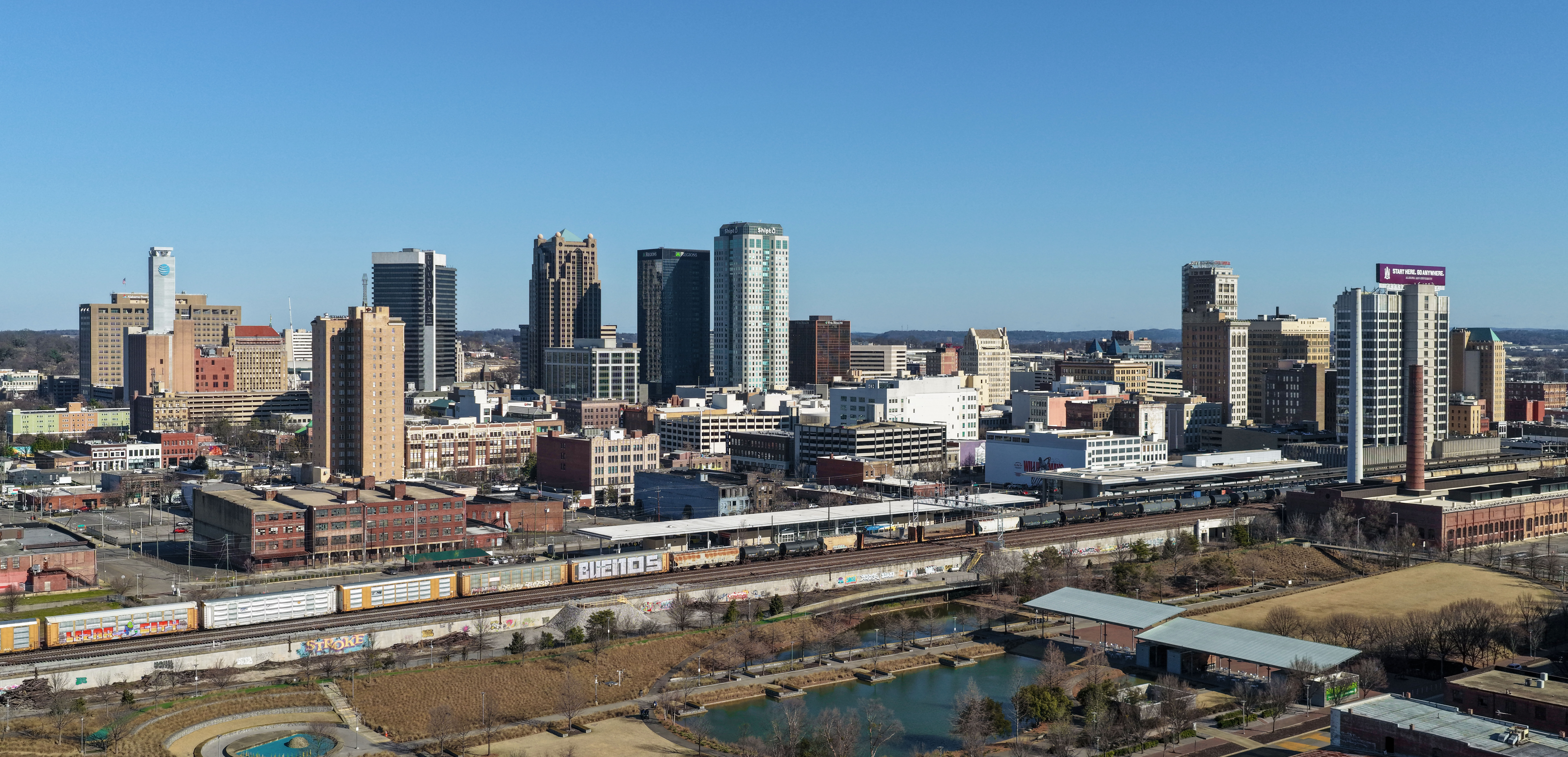
Birmingham's skyline from the southwest

== Tallest buildings ==
This list ranks Birmingham skyscrapers and high-rises that stand at least 200 feet (61 m) tall, based on standard height measurement. This includes spires and architectural details but does not include antenna masts. The "Year" column indicates the year in which a building was completed.

Tallest building in Birmingham upon completion

Rank	Name	Image	Height ft (m)	Floors	Year	Address	Notes
1	Shipt Tower		454 (138)	34	1986	420 20th Street North	2nd-tallest building in Alabama. Tallest building in Birmingham since its completion in 1986. Was previously known as the SouthTrust Tower (1986–2005), the Wachovia Tower (2005–2010), and the Wells Fargo Tower (2010–2019).
2	Regions-Harbert Plaza		437 (133)	32	1989	1901 6th Avenue North	3rd-tallest building in Alabama. Previously known as the AmSouth Harbert Plaza (1989–2007).
3	AT&T City Center		390 (119)	30	1972	600 19th Street North	6th-tallest building in Alabama. Tallest building in Birmingham from 1972 to 1986. Previously known as the South Central Bell Building, BellSouth Building and BellSouth City Center.
3	Regions Center		390 (119)	30	1972	1900 5th Avenue North	7th-tallest building in Alabama. Previously known as the First National Bank-Southern Natural Gas Building, AmSouth-Sonat Tower and AmSouth Center.
5	City Federal Building		325 (99)	27	1913	2024 2nd Avenue North	14th-tallest building in Alabama. Upon its completion, this was the tallest building in the Southeastern United States, in Birmingham from 1913 to 1972, and tallest in Alabama from 1913 until completion of the RSA–BankTrust Building in Mobile in 1969.
6	Alabama Power Headquarters Building		321 (98)	18	1990	600 18th Street North	16th-tallest building in Alabama. One of four buildings that make up the Alabama Power Headquarters Complex.
7	Thomas Jefferson Hotel		287 (87)	20	1929	1623 2nd Avenue North	19th-tallest building in Alabama. Previously known as the Cabana Hotel and Leer Tower. Notable for its mooring mast located atop its roof.
8	John Hand Building		284 (84)	20	1912	17 North 20th Street	20th-tallest building in Alabama. Tallest building in both Birmingham and Alabama from 1912 to 1913. One of the four high-rises that constitutes the Heaviest Corner on Earth.
9	Daniel Building		283 (86)	20	1970	15 South 20th Street	21st-tallest building in Alabama. Tallest building in Birmingham located outside of downtown.
10	Viva Health Building		275 (84)	17	1976	417 20th Street North	Constructed atop the site formally occupied by the Tutwiler Hotel. Previously known as the First Alabama Bank Building and Regions Plaza.
11	Two North Twentieth		273 (83)	17	1962	2 20th Street North	Constructed as the first modern office tower in Birmingham. Previously known as the Bank for Savings & Trust Building.
12	Financial Center		262 (80)	17	1982	505 20th Street North	Constructed atop the site formally occupied by the Moulton Hotel.
13	Empire Building		247 (75)	16	1909	110 20th Street North	Tallest building in both Birmingham and Alabama from 1909 to 1912. One of the four high-rises that constitutes the Heaviest Corner on Earth.
14	Watts Building		236 (72)	17	1928	2008 3rd Avenue North	
15	UAB Hospital Jefferson Tower		235 (72)	16	1940	625 19th Street South	
16	2121 Building		225 (69)	17	1962	2121 Reverend Abraham Woods Jr. Boulevard	
17	Alabama Power Building		217 (66)	16	1925	1802 6th Avenue North	Topped with a 23-foot tall golden statue of Electra crafted by Edward Field Sanford, Jr.

== Tallest under construction ==
As of June 2024, there are 0 buildings under construction in Birmingham that are planned to rise at least 200 feet (61 m) tall.

Name	Image	Height ft (m)	Floors	Year (est.)	Status	Notes

== Tallest approved or proposed ==
These buildings have either been approved, awaiting construction, or proposed to rise at least 200 feet (61 m) tall.

Name	Height ft (m)	Floors	Year (est.)	Status	Notes

== Timeline of tallest buildings ==
This lists buildings that once held the title of tallest building in Birmingham.

Name	Street address	Years as tallest	Height ft (m)	Floors	Reference
Empire Building	110 20th Street North	1909–1912	247 (75)	16	
John Hand Building	17 North 20th Street	1912–1913	284 (84)	20	
City Federal Building	2024 2nd Avenue North	1913–1972	325 (99)	27	
AT&T City Center	600 19th Street North	1972–1986	390 (119)	30	
Shipt Tower	420 20th Street North	1986–present	454 (138)	34	
