= Viva Health =

Viva Health may refer to:

- Viva Health, the health maintenance organization owned by UAB Hospital in Birmingham, Alabama, United States
  - Viva Health Building, one of the tallest buildings in Birmingham, Alabama, United States
- Viva! Health, a British science-based health and nutrition charity
- Vivas Health, or Aviva Group Ireland, the Irish arm of British insurance firm Aviva in Dublin, Ireland
