= GM Building =

GM Building may refer to:

- Cadillac Place in Detroit, commonly known as the GM Building
- General Motors Building (New York), commonly known as the GM Building
- GM Building (Mobile)
