= Concord Center =

Office building in Alabama, US

- Interactive map of the Concord Center area

General information
- Status: Completed
- Type: Class-A Office Building
- Location: 2100 Third Avenue North, Birmingham, Alabama, USA
- Coordinates: 33°31′2.4″N 86°48′19.2″W
- Construction started: May 2000
- Opening: March 1, 2002
- Cost: US$26 million
- Owner: Macfarlan Capital Partners
- Management: EGS Cushman Wakefield

Height
- Antenna spire: 145 feet (44 m)
- Top floor: 11

Technical details
- Floor count: 11
- Floor area: 152,000 square feet (14,121 m^{2})

Design and construction
- Architect: Williams Blackstock Architects
- Developer: Brookmont Realty Group, LLC
- Structural engineer: CRS Engineering, Inc.
- Main contractor: B.L. Harbert International

The Concord Center is an 11-story, 145 foot-tall (44m), Class-A office building located in downtown Birmingham, Alabama. The building is located on the site of the former Jefferson County Courthouse, which was Birmingham's first skyscraper. The two 30-foot illuminated pyramids atop the building are meant to reflect the two pyramids that were atop the former Jefferson County Courthouse.

== History ==
The site of the Concord Center is located on what was once the site of Birmingham's first skyscraper, the former Jefferson County Courthouse. The former Jefferson County Courthouse building was built in 1889 and occupied the site until it was torn down in 1937, having been replaced in 1929 by the new Jefferson County Courthouse building.

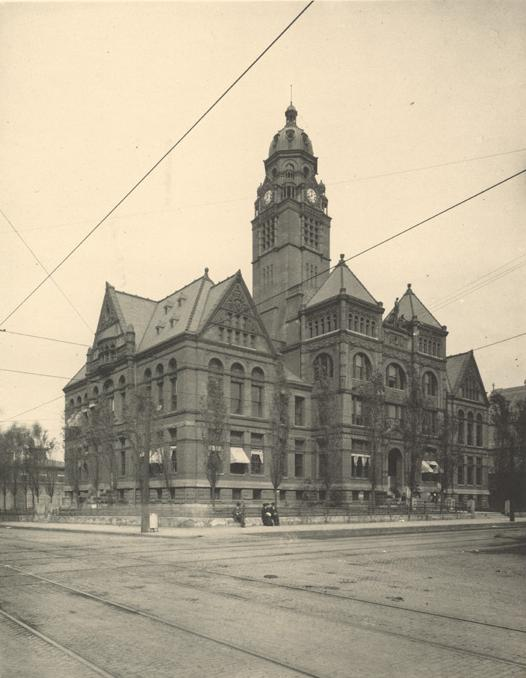
Old Jefferson County Courthouse in 1907

The site remained vacant for over 60 years, serving only as a parking lot for the adjacent YMCA of Birmingham. Brookmont Realty Group purchased the site in 1999. Soon after purchasing the site, Brookmont Realty announced that it was planning to build an 11-story, 152,000 square foot office building on the property. The law firm of Lange, Simpson, Robinson & Somerville LLC, which became Adams and Reese, leased the top three floors of the building making it the anchor tenant.

Construction of the Concord Center began in May 2000 after removing what was left of the foundation of the former courthouse building. Williams Blackstock Architects was chosen as the architectural firm to design the building, with B.L. Harbert International serving as the general contractor for the project. The architects designed the top of the building to include two 30-foot tall illuminated pyramids to reflect two pyramids that were part of the design of the old courthouse. Construction was completed in early 2002 and officially opened on March 1.

In 2007, Harbert Management Corporation announced that it would relocate its corporate headquarters, along with 120 employees, from its Riverchase headquarters campus in Hoover to the building.

In August 2012, Cadence Bank announced that it planned to move its corporate headquarters to the Concord Center from the nearby John Hand Building. Cadence planned to take space occupied by the law firm of Adams and Reese, which was planning to relocate to the nearby Regions-Harbert Plaza. It was also announced that Cadence would open a bank branch in the lobby of the building as well as add an ATM. The move was completed by early 2013.

=== Artwork ===
When the building was being designed, the developer, the Birmingham Museum of Art, and the architects worked together to create space in the building's two-story lobby to display artwork. The Birmingham Museum of Art loaned some of the artwork that is currently placed in the lobby. The centerpiece of the lobby is a large globe of the world that is hand-carved out of wood . The globe was originally located in the lobby of Harbert Management Corporation's headquarters in Riverchase. It was commissioned by Harbert Corporation, the predecessor to Harbert Management Corporation, when the company was still in the construction business. The globe was meant to reflect Harbert's international construction presence and its many projects going on all over the world.

== Tenants ==
- Harbert Management Corporation
- Cadence Bank
- JPMorgan Chase & Co
- Adams and Reese (former)
