= Waterman Building (Mobile, Alabama) =

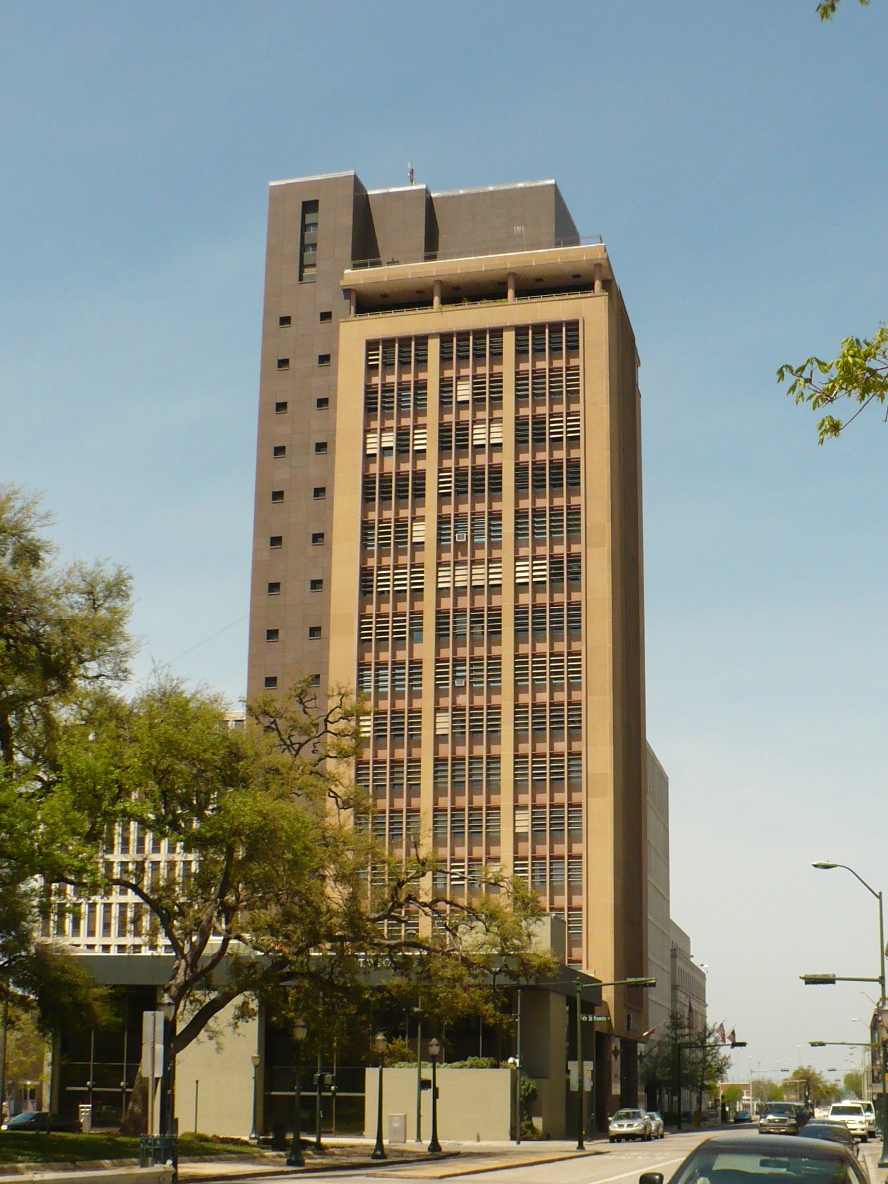

General information
- Type: Office
- Location: 61 Saint Joseph Street, Mobile, Alabama, United States
- Coordinates: 30°41′35.2″N 88°2′32.51″W
- Completed: 1947
- Opening: 1947
- Owner: WATERSOUTH ASSOCIATES L L C

Height
- Roof: 230 feet (70 m)

Technical details
- Floor count: 16
- Lifts/elevators: 4

Design and construction
- Architects: Platt Roberts & Associates
- Developer: Waterman Steamship Company

The Waterman Building (formerly known as the Waterman Building, the Southtrust Bank Building, the Wells-Fargo Building, and the Wachovia Building) is a high-rise in the U.S. city of Mobile, Alabama. It was built by the Waterman Steamship Corporation in 1947, and rises 230 feet (70 m) and 16 stories. The Waterman-Smith Building is the 7th-tallest building in Mobile, and is an example of early modern architecture.

Completed in 1947, it was the only high-rise to be constructed in the city from the 1929 completion of the Regions Bank Building to 1965, when the GM Building was completed. It was constructed on the site of the Bienville Hotel, a low-rise seven-story hotel. At the time of construction, the building was referred to as the turning point when the city entered the modern age, and cost $5 million (equivalent to $72,093,890 in 2025).

The Waterman Steamship Corporation, after becoming the largest privately owned steamship firm in the world, was purchased by McLean Securities Corporation in May 1955. The building was renamed "The Roberts Building" in honor of former Waterman chairman E.A. Roberts, who remained involved with McLean for decades afterwards. The Roberts Building sold to Commercial Guaranty Banking Company in 1973.

The structure housed the Waterman Globe, a 12-foot (4 m) diameter sphere created by Rand McNally that depicts the world with the political boundaries of the 1940s. The globe was a local attraction but was removed from the building in 1973 and deconstructed. It was later restored and moved to the University of South Alabama's Mitchell Center in 1999.

In 2017, the building was sold to Waterman-Smith I, LLC a company owned by Darryl D. Smith of Hammond, Louisiana for $2.35 million. On June 11, 2025, Waterman-Smith I, LLC filed for Chapter 11 bankruptcy and the building was sold at auction. As of 2026, the building no longer bears the "Waterman-Smith" name.

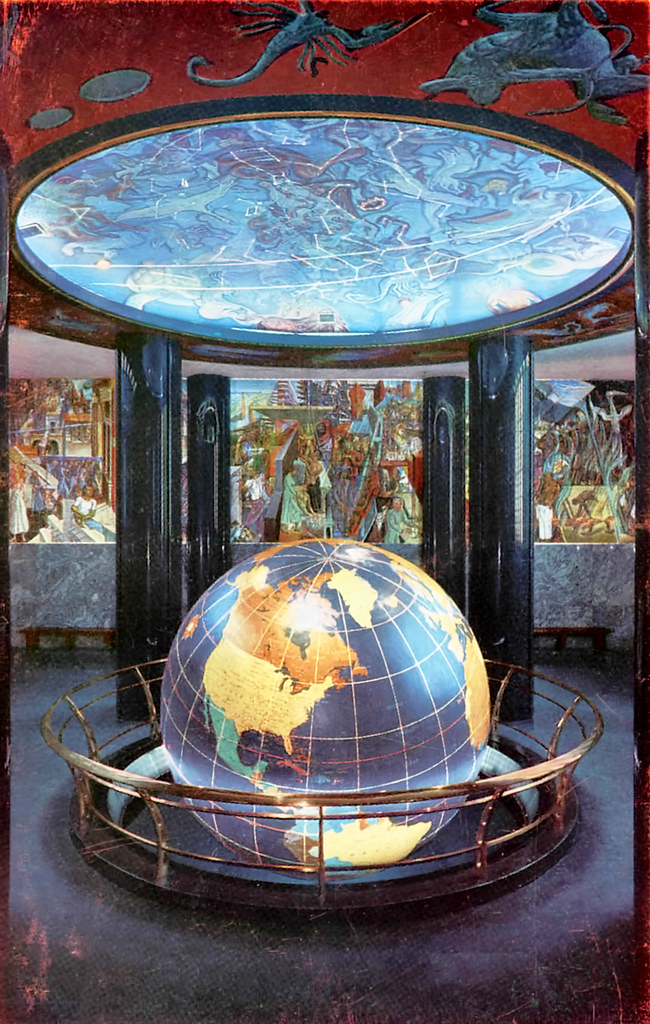
The Waterman Building lobby containing the Waterman Globe. Circa 1960s.

== See also ==
- List of tallest buildings in Mobile
