= SouthTrust Bank =

Community bank in Texas, United States

SouthTrust Bank, N.A.
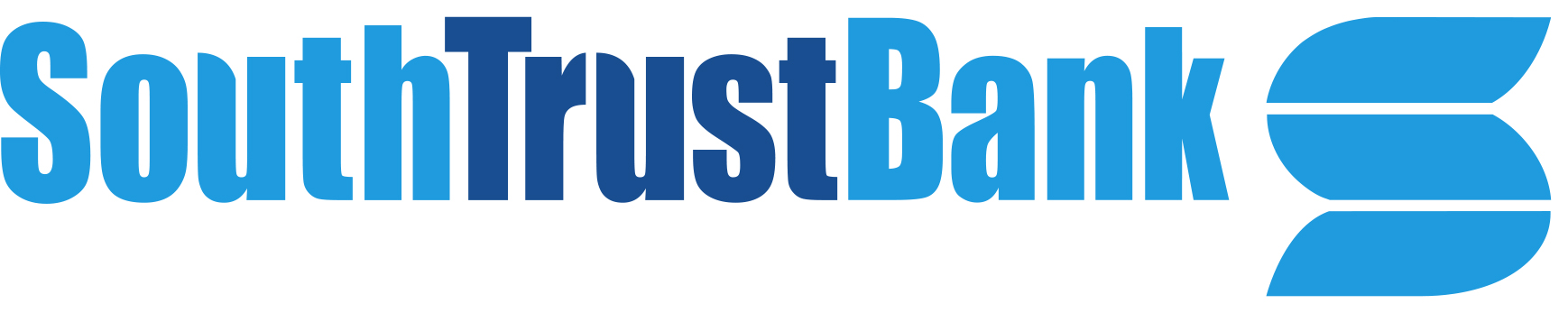
- Formerly: First National Bank of George West
- Industry: Banking
- Founded: 1934; 92 years ago in George West, Texas
- Number of locations: 8 branches (2025)
- Total assets: US$557,000,000(2025)
- Parent: Live Oak Bancshares
- Website: www.southtrust.com

SouthTrust Bank, N. A. is a community bank founded in George West, Texas, in 1934. The bank has eight branches and over $550 million in assets (as of June 30, 2025). Originally known as First National Bank of George West, the bank rebranded in 2013 to SouthTrust Bank after acquiring the trademark rights to the name from Wells Fargo. The bank is a subsidiary of Live Oak Bancshares, a privately-held, one-bank holding company.

Branches are located in Channelview, Ft. Bend County, Floresville, George West, Houston, Pleasanton, San Antonio, and Three Rivers, Texas. The bank offers a wide range of banking products and services to consumer and business customers throughout the markets it serves.

Bank board of directors members include:

- Stuart Saunders – Chairman of the Board, SouthTrust Bank; Mission-Heights, LLC
- David Dominy – Managing director, JLL Valuation Advisory
- Edward Griffin – CEO, Griffin Partners
- Steve Jackson – President & CEO, SouthTrust Bank
- Mark Katzfey – Katzfey Ranches
- Mike Laux – Oil and gas consulting, retired
- James Pawlik – Ranching; President Pawlik Supply
- David West – CTX Restaurants, Inc.

== See also ==
- SouthTrust (1887–2005)
