= Regions Bank Building (Mobile) =

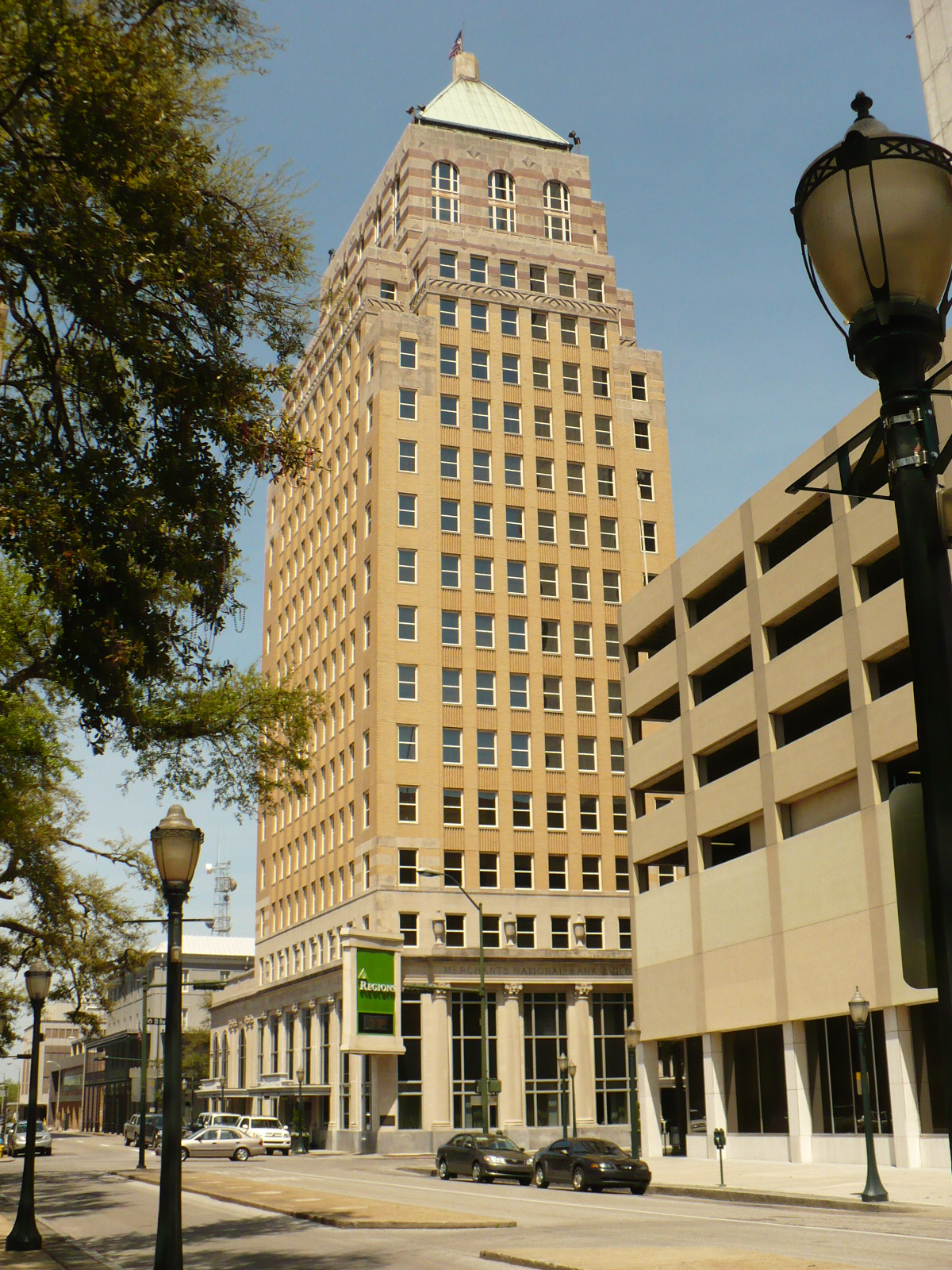
- Interactive map of the Regions Bank Building area

General information
- Type: Office
- Location: 56 Saint Joseph Street, Mobile, Alabama
- Coordinates: 30°41′35.01″N 88°2′31.68″W
- Construction started: 1928
- Completed: 1929
- Opening: 1929

Height
- Roof: 120 feet (37 m)

Technical details
- Floor count: 18
- Lifts/elevators: 5

Design and construction
- Architect: Graham, Anderson, Probst & White
- Developer: Merchants National Bank

The Merchants National Bank Building, previously known as the "First Alabama Bank Building" and more recently the "Regions Bank Building" is a high-rise in the US City of Mobile, Alabama. Completed in 1929, the building rises 236 feet (72 m) and 18 stories. Upon its completion, the Merchants National Bank Building became the tallest building in Mobile, the seventh-tallest building in the state of Alabama, and the tallest skyscraper in the state outside Birmingham. The building remained the tallest in the city until the completion of the RSA–BankTrust Building in 1965. The Merchants National Bank Building now stands as the 6th-tallest building in Mobile.

The Merchants National Bank Building, designed by Chicago-based architectural firm Graham, Anderson, Probst & White, is an example of Art Deco architecture. It has a distinctive copper-plated pyramidal roof structure; the height to the base of the pyramid is 190 feet (58 m).

On August 1, 2017, it was announced the building would undergo a major renovation into a $30 million 82 unit apartment complex. The project began in 2018 and was completed in 2020.

== See also ==
- List of tallest buildings in Mobile

Preceded by Van Antwerp Building	Tallest Building in Mobile; 1929—1965; 72m	Succeeded by RSA–BankTrust Building
