= Colonial Brookwood Center =

- Interactive map of the Colonial Brookwood Center area

General information
- Status: Completed
- Type: Class A Office
- Location: 569 Brookwood Village Homewood, Alabama, US
- Coordinates: 33.470793°N 86.770921°W
- Completed: 2006
- Opening: 2007
- Cost: $36 million USD
- Owner: Colonial Properties Trust
- Operator: Colonial Properties Trust

Height
- Antenna spire: 120 feet (37 m)
- Top floor: 9

Technical details
- Floor count: 9
- Floor area: 170,000 square feet (15,794 m^{2})

Design and construction
- Architects: Rule Joy Trammell & Rubio
- Developer: Colonial Properties Trust
- Structural engineer: CRS Engineering Inc.
- Main contractor: Brasfield & Gorrie

References
- https://web.archive.org/web/20110708175421/http://colonialbrookwoodcenter.com/

The Colonial Brookwood Center is a 9-story Class A office building located in the Birmingham, Alabama suburb of Homewood. The office building was previously owned by Colonial Properties Trust and was a part of the company's Colonial Brookwood Village development. Construction on the building began in 2006. The building consists of 9 floors, 4 of which contain parking and retail, and 5 that contain corporate offices.

== Tenants ==
The largest tenant in the building is Birmingham-based energy company Southern Natural Gas, which occupies 70,000 square feet. Other tenants include Kinder Morgan, Surgical Care Affiliates, and Merrill Lynch.

== See also ==
- Colonial Brookwood Village
- List of tallest buildings in Birmingham, Alabama
