= SouthTrust (1887–2005) =

Former bank holding company

SouthTrust Corporation

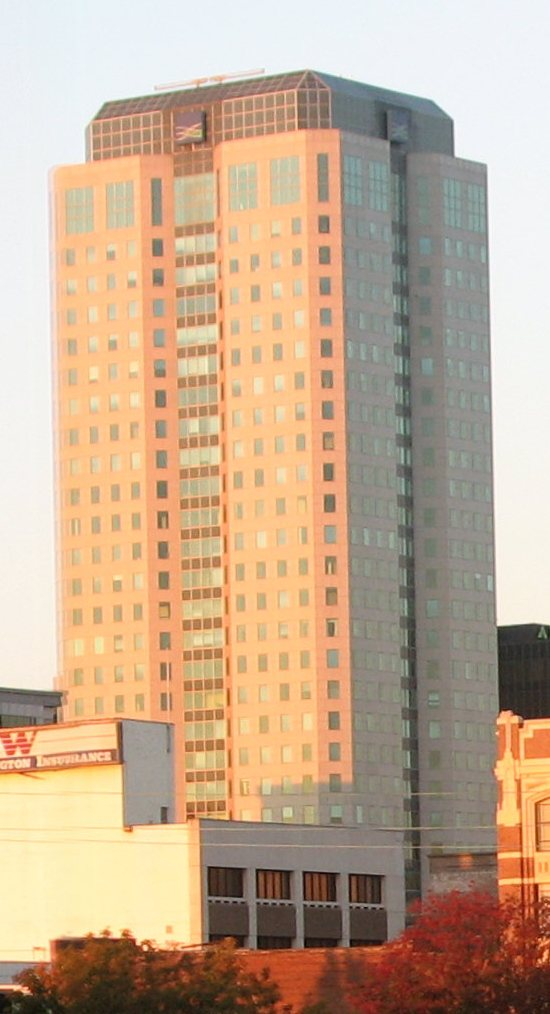
- SouthTrust Tower (now Shipt Tower) as seen in 2010 as Wachovia Tower, the bank’s former headquarters in Birmingham, Alabama
- Formerly: Bank: Birmingham Trust and Savings Company (1887–1946); Birmingham Trust National Bank (1946–1982); Holding Company: BTNB Corporation (1969–1972); Alabama Financial Group, Inc. (1972–1974); Southern Bancorporation (1974–1975); Southern Bancorporation of Alabama (1975–1981)
- Type: Defunct
- Traded as: Nasdaq: SOTR
- Industry: Finance and Insurance
- Founded: November 9, 1887; 138 years ago
- Defunct: November 1, 2004; 21 years ago (as an independent bank); December 7, 2005; 20 years ago (as a brand)
- Fate: Acquired by Wachovia
- Successor: Wachovia (now Wells Fargo)
- Headquarters: Birmingham, Alabama
- Number of locations: 728 (2005)
- Key people: Wallace D. Malone Jr. (CEO); Julian Banton (President)
- Products: Financial services
- Revenue: ▲$3.32 billion USD (2003)
- Total assets: $53 billion (2004)
- Number of employees: 12,400 (2003)

SouthTrust Corporation was a banking company headquartered in Birmingham, Alabama. In 2004, SouthTrust reached an agreement to merge with Wachovia in a stock-for-stock deal. At the time of the merger with Wachovia was completed, SouthTrust had $53 Billion in assets. SouthTrust was listed on the NASDAQ exchange under the ticker symbol SOTR. The company was headquartered in the SouthTrust Tower, now known as the Shipt Tower. SouthTrust had branches in Alabama, Florida, Georgia, Mississippi, North Carolina, South Carolina, Tennessee, Texas and Virginia. By the end of 2005, all former SouthTrust branches that remained open carried the Wachovia name.

== History ==
=== 1887 to 1980 ===
SouthTrust Corporation began as Birmingham Trust and Savings Company in 1887. In 1946 the bank sought a charter to become a national bank. After receiving the charter, the name of the bank changed to Birmingham Trust National Bank, which was commonly known as BTNB. In 1972 BTNB combined with three other Alabama banks to become the Alabama Financial Group, Inc. which was a holding company for the four banks. In 1974 the holding company changed its name to Southern Bancorporation of Alabama. Through the rest of the 1970s, Southern Bank continued buying other community banks located throughout Alabama. By this time Southern Bank held assets of over $1 billion.

=== 1981 to 1987 ===
In 1981 the holding company again changed its name, this time to SouthTrust Corporation. In 1986, SouthTrust decided to build a new building for its headquarters in downtown Birmingham. Work began right away on what would become the 34/story SouthTrust Tower. SouthTrust had $5.3 billion in assets by the end of 1986 and had expanded as much as it could in its home state of Alabama. After a change in an Alabama law allowed banks to buy other banks in the 12 southeastern states, SouthTrust made its first purchase outside of Alabama. In 1987 SouthTrust purchased the Central Bank of South Daytona Beach located in Daytona Beach, Florida. SouthTrust quickly focused on Florida for its new acquisitions and acquired many banks, mostly located in northern and Central Florida. Towards the end of 1987 SouthTrust made its first entry into the Georgia market when it moved the SouthTrust National Bank of Russell County headquarters across the state line to Columbus, Georgia.

=== 1988 to 1997 ===
When the bank decided it was time to enter the Tennessee market, it did so by opening up a branch instead of buying a bank already established there. The first Tennessee branch was located in Nashville. By the end of 1989, SouthTrust opened its first South Carolina branch, located in Charleston. As 1990 came around, SouthTrust had grown to over $7.5 billion in assets and had become the largest bank in Alabama. By 1991 SouthTrust had entered the North Carolina market when it bought Barclays' small American operation based in Charlotte. By 1992 SouthTrust had $12 billion in assets and 336 banking branches in six states, but announced that instead of looking to grow geographical wise that it would instead focus on growing in its existing markets. By the end of 1993, SouthTrust's assets had grown to $15.1 billion. In 1994 SouthTrust made its first entry into Mississippi when it purchased First Jefferson Corporation. This purchase helped added to an increase in SouthTrust branch number which had grown to over 400. In 1995, SouthTrust acquired Bankers First Corporation (Nasdaq: BNKF), which was the parent of Bankers First Federal Savings and Loan. Two big changes came in 1996. The first was that all SouthTrust banks would merge under one national bank charter. The second was SouthTrusts entry into life insurance through SouthTrust Insurance, Inc. By end of 1997, SouthTrust entered the state of Texas through when it bought SecurityBank Texas.

=== 1998 to 2005 ===
The late 1990s proved to be one of the most important times in SouthTrust's 118-year history. The bank had become one of the largest banks in the south. Birmingham had grown into the largest banking city in the south based on the number of top 50 US banks headquartered there, although not the largest by assets. In Birmingham, AmSouth Bancorporation, Compass Bancshares, Regions Financial Corporation and SouthTrust all became known as the Big Four. All four banks were top 50 US banks and all headquartered in downtown Birmingham. Only New York City had more banks and no other city equaled with Birmingham. In 2000 the bank made a change from being a nationally chartered bank to a state chartered bank. In 2001, SouthTrust made its first entry into the Virginia banking market when it purchased CENIT Bank. Later that same year, SouthTrust expanded in Virginia when it bought the Bank of Tidewater. From the end of 2001 to 2003, SouthTrust continued making acquisitions by buying small banks in markets in which they already operated so that it could grow its customer base. By the end of 2004, SouthTrust had $53 billion in assets and 712 branches in nine states.

== Merger with Wachovia ==
On Monday June 21, 2004 Wachovia Corporation announced it would buy SouthTrust in an all-stock transaction valued at $14.3 billion. The merger closed on November 1, 2004. The Birmingham market was the last market for the conversion to the Wachovia brand which occurred in October 2005.

=== Criticism ===
About a year before the merger was announced, Wallace Malone, the company's CEO, quietly moved SouthTrust's commercial banking division headquarters from Birmingham to Atlanta. When the public found out, Malone quickly assured the city and employees that SouthTrust's corporate headquarters would remain in Birmingham. Soon after, when Malone was asked in a local newspaper whether he would ever consider selling the bank in the future, he responded by saying he believed SouthTrust was better on its own than combined with any other bank. Even within the company, he strongly preached to employees that the bank would stay independent. This caused residents of Birmingham to be blindsided when the news that SouthTrust had reached a deal to sell itself to Wachovia was announced. The biggest loss to Birmingham came from SouthTrust moving its commercial banking division to Atlanta a year before the merger was announced, and that Atlanta, not Birmingham, would end up with Wachovia's Southern Banking Group headquarters. Around 1,700 of the 4,000 local SouthTrust jobs were lost in Birmingham due to the merger. Many former SouthTrust Customers have defected to banks like Regions and BBVA Compass.

==== Malone's golden parachute ====
When the merger was completed, Malone's $100 million golden parachute went into effect. The New York Times put this figure closer to $135 million. Malone has stated that somewhere around 40% of that total will go into a trust for the families affected by the SouthTrust-Wachovia merger, although nothing further has been mentioned yet regarding this matter.

== Trademark acquisition ==
In 2013, First National Bank of George West, based in south Texas and founded in 1934, acquired the rights to the name SouthTrust Bank. The new SouthTrust Bank is not affiliated with the original SouthTrust Bank of Alabama, acquiring only the trademark rights to the name as an effort to distinguish their brand amongst other national banks. The new SouthTrust Bank, N. A. offers financial services in various Texas markets including Floresville, Houston, San Antonio, Three Rivers, Pleasanton, Channelview. and George West.
