= Van Antwerp Building =

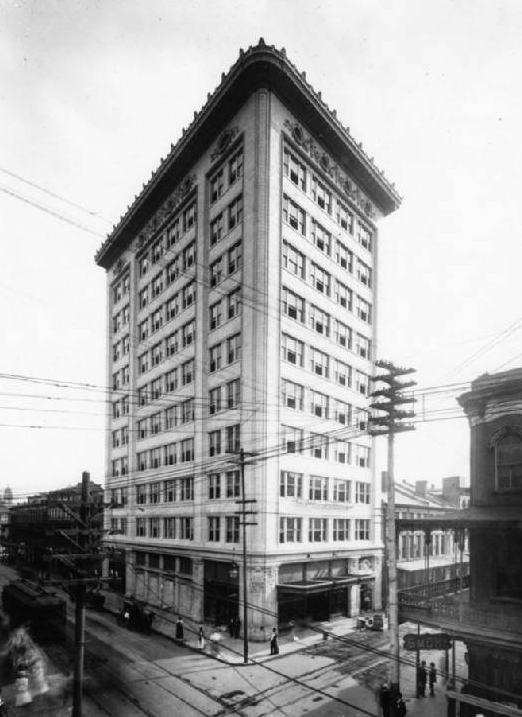
- The Van Antwerp Building in 1907
- Interactive map of the Van Antwerp Building area

General information
- Type: Office
- Location: 101 Dauphin Street, Mobile, Alabama
- Coordinates: 30°41′31.9″N 88°2′27.32″W
- Completed: 1907
- Opening: 1908

Height
- Roof: 120 feet (37 m)

Technical details
- Floor count: 11
- Lifts/elevators: 1

Design and construction
- Architect: George Bigelow Rogers

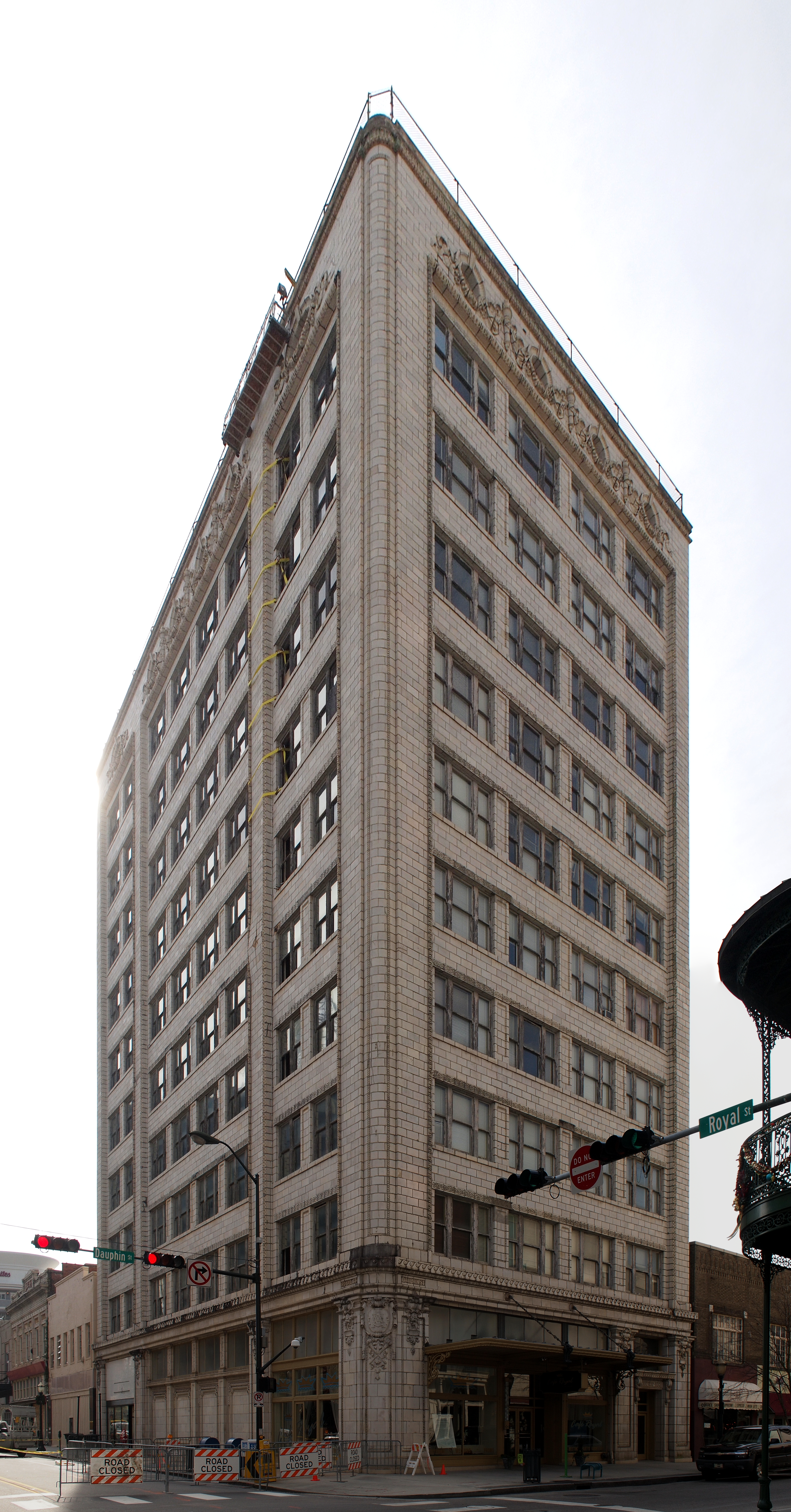
A modern view

The Van Antwerp Building is a high-rise in the U.S. city of Mobile, Alabama. Completed in 1907, the building rises 11 stories and was the first skyscraper in the city. It is regarded as the first reinforced concrete skyscraper in Alabama and the Southeastern United States. In the early 21st century, the 120-foot (37 m) structure is the 12th-tallest building in Mobile.

The building, an example of Beaux-Arts architecture, was designed by architect George Bigelow Rogers for Garet Van Antwerp, a wealthy Mobile druggist. The tower was built to house his pharmacy store, with other offices on the upper floors. It remained in operation on the building's ground floor until the 1960s.

The Van Antwerp Building was purchased by the Retirement Systems of Alabama in October 2012. It was unoccupied except for a first-floor restaurant, and the building was deteriorating and in bad repair. It was completely restored and enlarged from 2014 through 2016, including historical restoration of the terracotta exterior, reinstalling the decorative cornice (removed in the 1950s), new windows, structural repairs, first floor historical renovation, and new MEP systems. Following this, the building became operational and occupied in 2016.

== See also ==
- List of tallest buildings in Mobile

| Preceded by Cathedral Basilica of the Immaculate Conception | Tallest Building in Mobile; 1907—1929; 37m | Succeeded by Regions Bank Building |
