= Regions Center (Birmingham) =

Office tower in Birmingham, Alabama, US

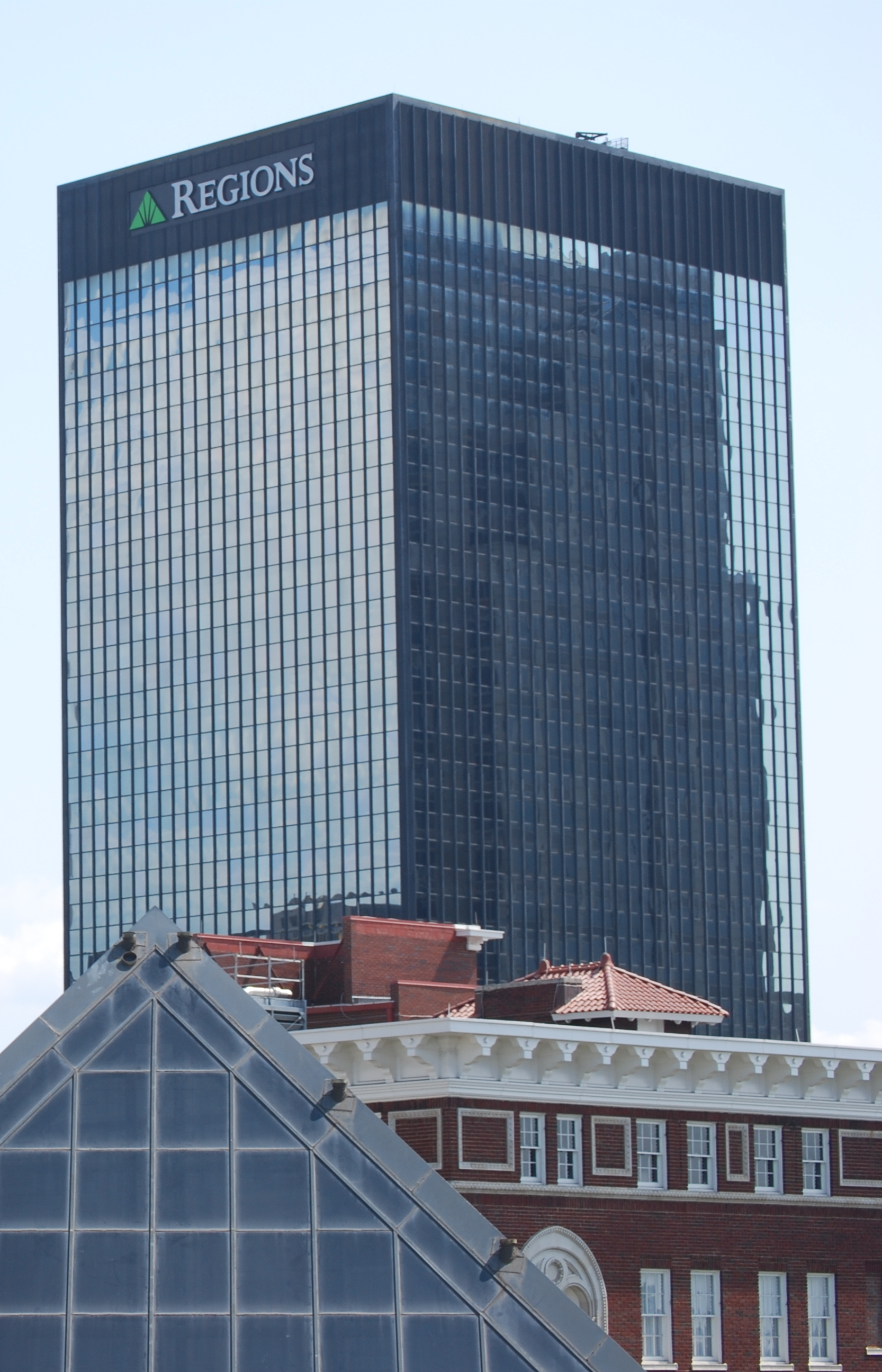
- Interactive map of the Regions Center area

General information
- Status: Completed
- Type: Corporate Headquarters
- Location: 1900 Fifth Avenue North Birmingham, Alabama, United States
- Coordinates: 33.5186°N 86.8078°W
- Opening: 1972
- Owner: Regions Financial Corporation
- Management: Cushman & Wakefield

Height
- Antenna spire: 390 feet (119 m)
- Top floor: 30

Technical details
- Floor count: 30
- Floor area: 630,000 square feet (58,529 m^{2})

Design and construction
- Architect: Welton Becket & Associates

The Regions Center (formerly the AmSouth Center, before that the AmSouth-Sonat Tower, and originally the First National-Southern Natural Building) is a 390-foot (120-meter) tall, 30 story office tower located at the northwest corner of 20th Street and 5th Avenue North in Birmingham, Alabama, United States.

The building served as the corporate headquarters for AmSouth Bancorporation from 1972 until 2006, and Sonat, Inc. and its subsidiaries from 1972 until 2007, when it relocated to the Colonial Brookwood Center. The building now serves as the corporate headquarters for Regions Financial Corporation.

== History ==
Completed in 1972, the modernist-style skyscraper was designed by Welton Becket & Associates of Houston with Charles H. McCauley Associates serving as the local associated firm. Built as a partnership between First National Bank and Southern Natural Gas Corporation, its original name was the First National-Southern Natural Building. The reflective glass skin stretches between a generously scaled black granite base story and a louvered steel penthouse enclosure. The building is set back from the corner with a raised terrace plaza. A one-story banking lobby facing 20th Street closes off the north side of a sunken courtyard which serves the basement-level cafeteria.

During the early 1980s First National changed its name to AmSouth Bancorporation as well as Southern Natural Gas changing its name to Sonat, Inc., and the building was then given its most familiar name the AmSouth-Sonat Tower. In 1986, Sonat announced that it would sell its 50 percent interest in the building to AmSouth and lease back its half of the building, but decided to retain its interest instead.

In 1999, Sonat merged with Houston-based El Paso Corporation. El Paso maintained a large presence in the building with its Southern Natural Gas division using it as its headquarters. El Paso also had energy trading offices located in the building after it merged Sonat's Marketing and Power Marketing divisions to its own energy trading business. In 2001, Sonat finally sold its 50 percent interest in the building to AmSouth. As a result, the building's name changed again in 2002, being renamed the AmSouth Center.

In November 2006, after the merger of AmSouth and Regions, the name of the building officially changed to the Regions Center with the new Regions logo replacing the AmSouth logo. On January 29, 2007, Southern Natural announced that it would move its headquarters to the Colonial Brookwood Center, located in one of Birmingham's suburbs. After renovating Sonat's former offices, Regions became the sole occupant of the building.

=== Lighting ===
During the Christmas season, 2,200 colored gels are illuminated above each panel of the glass curtain wall, creating an enormous lit graphical display visible on the skyline from several vantage points around the city. The east and west sides display a Christmas tree, the south side features a wreath, and the north side shows a stocking.

Since 2007, the building has been illuminated every May for the Regions Tradition and the Regions Charity Classic before that. All four sides of the building are illuminated to depict a golfer teeing off.

== See also ==
- List of tallest buildings in Birmingham, Alabama
- Regions Financial Corporation
- AmSouth Bancorporation
- Sonat, Inc. / El Paso Corporation
- Birmingham, Alabama
