= John Hand Building =

- First National-John A. Hand Building
- U.S. National Register of Historic Places
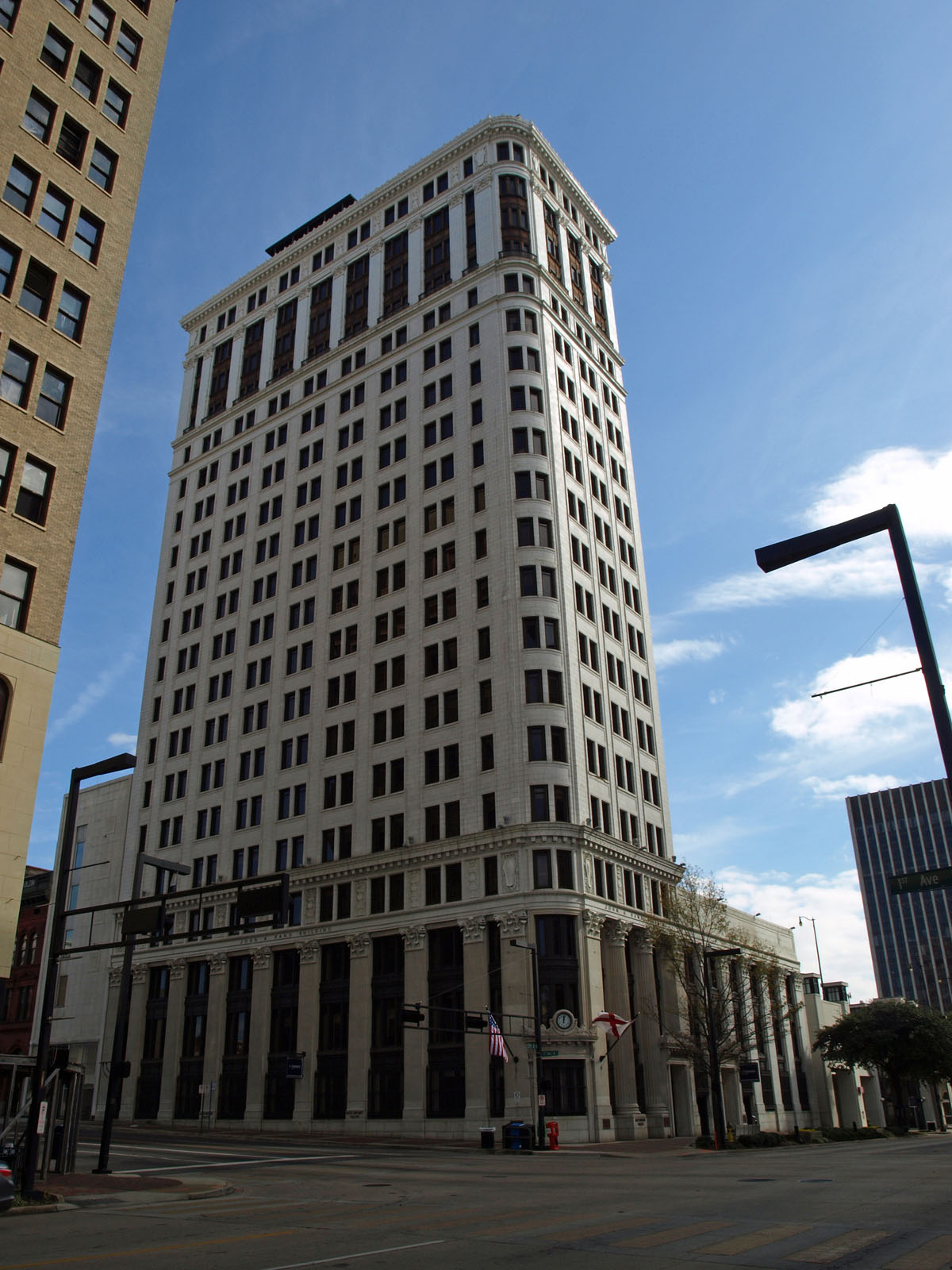

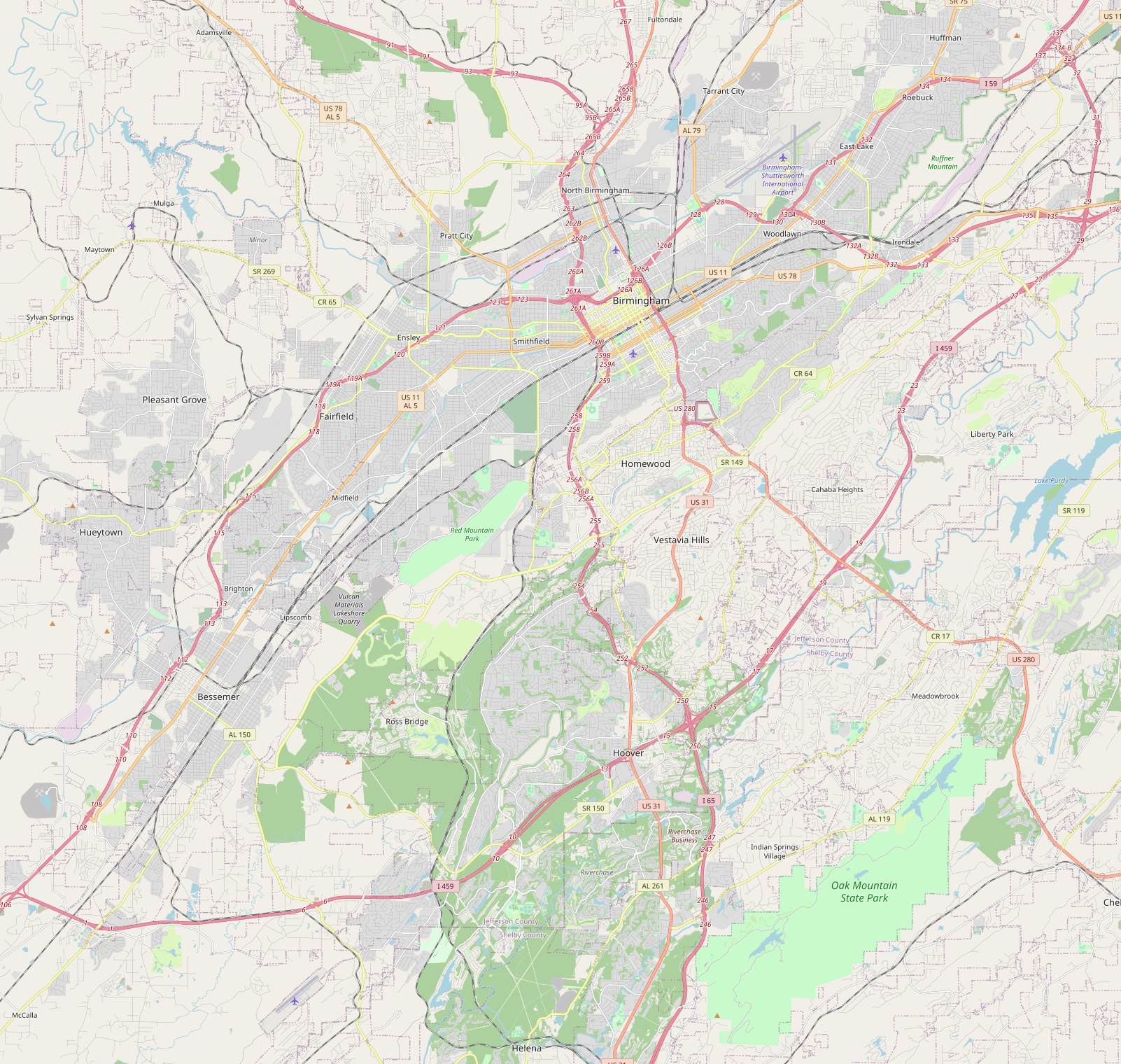
- Location within Birmingham, Alabama Location within Alabama Location within the United States
- Location: 17 N. 20th St., Birmingham, Alabama
- Coordinates: 33°30′52″N 86°48′19″W
- Area: 0.6 acres (0.24 ha)
- Built: 1912
- Architect: William Leslie Welton
- Architectural style: Classical Revival, Neo-Classical Revival
- NRHP reference No.: 83002976
- Added to NRHP: September 29, 1983

John Hand Building is a mixed-use high rise building in Birmingham, Alabama, US, with a height of 287 feet (87 m). It was the tallest building in the city until surpassed by the City Federal Building in 1913. It comprises 20 floors and was completed in 1912. The lower eight floors are for commercial use and the upper twelve floors are for residential use. In 1983, the building was added to the National Register of Historic Places.

From the time of its construction and up until the mid-1990s, the building had been owned and occupied by AmSouth Bancorporation and its predecessors. After AmSouth relocated employees to its other downtown offices and its Riverchase Campus, the building was sold to a group of developers. In 2000, it was renovated at a cost of $20 million. It served as the corporate headquarters of Cadence Bank and its predecessor bank until 2013 when it relocated to the Concord Center. The building now has since served as the corporate headquarters for Shipt, which had its logo on the south-side of the building until 2022, when it was replaced by the logo for Shipt's sister company, Landing.
