= Shipt Tower =

Office tower in Birmingham, Alabama, US

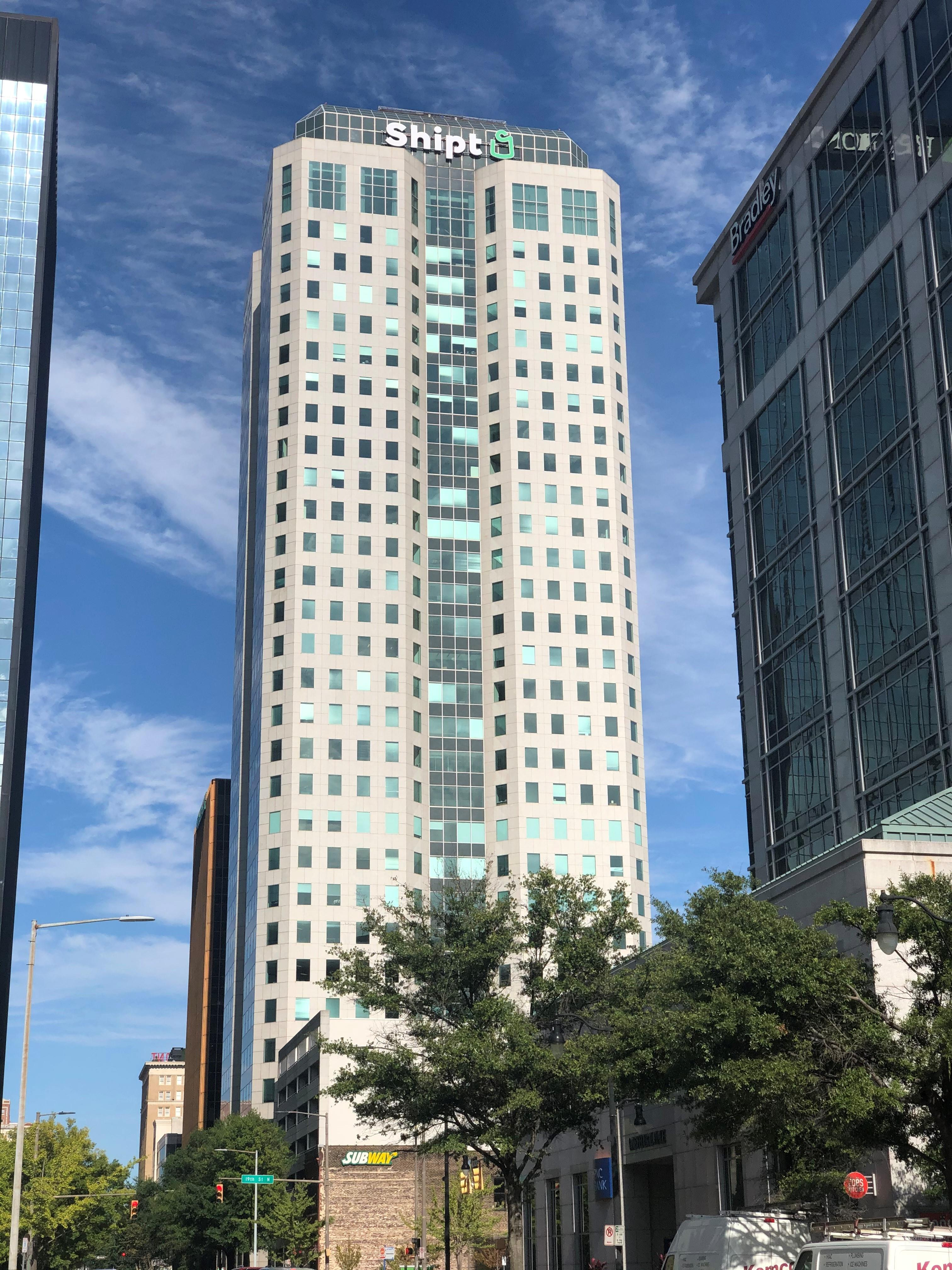
- Interactive map of the Shipt Tower area

General information
- Status: Completed
- Type: Class A Office Building
- Location: 420 Twentieth Street North Birmingham, Alabama, U.S.
- Coordinates: 33.5176°N 86.8083°W
- Opening: 1986
- Owner: Barry Companies

Height
- Antenna spire: 454 feet (138 m)

Technical details
- Floor count: 34
- Floor area: 550,994 square feet (51,189 m^{2})

Design and construction
- Architects: Skidmore, Owings & Merrill; Giattina, Fisher & Aycock
- Structural engineer: MBA Structural Engineers, Inc.
- Main contractor: Brice Building Company

References
- www.thewachoviatower.com

The Shipt Tower is a 34-story, 454-foot (138 m) tall office building in Birmingham, Alabama. Built in 1986 as the corporate headquarters for SouthTrust Corporation, the building was known as the SouthTrust Tower until 2005, when SouthTrust completed its merger with Wachovia and it became the Wachovia Tower. It became the Wells Fargo Tower in September 2010 after Wells Fargo completed its purchase of Wachovia and a new logo was placed atop the building. Shipt, a local start-up and subsidiary of the Target Corporation announced in January 2019 that it would become the anchor tenant of the building in 2020. The Tower was rebranded as the Shipt Tower on May 23, 2020, when corporate signage was placed atop the tower.

== History ==
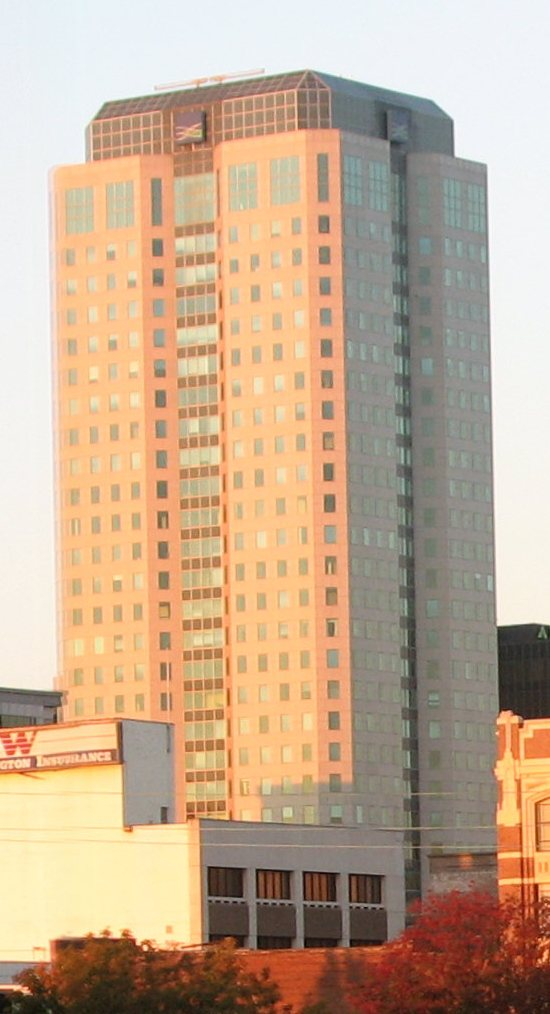
Building when it was topped with Wachovia signage from 2005 to 2010

The building was developed by Johnston-Rast & Hays and designed by architects Skidmore, Owings & Merrill and Giattina, Fisher & Aycock. Brice Building Company was the contractor for the project. It displaced the First National Bank Building in Mobile as the tallest building in Alabama and held that distinction until 2006, when the RSA Battle House Tower in Mobile surpassed it.

Today, the building's largest tenant is law firm Burr & Forman. It is also a regional headquarters for Wells Fargo, the second largest tenant, and home to the Birmingham office of Baker, Donelson, Bearman, Caldwell & Berkowitz, Deloitte, and KPMG.

== See also ==
- List of tallest buildings in Birmingham, Alabama

Preceded by RSA–BankTrust Building	Tallest Building in Alabama; 1986–2007; 138m	Succeeded by RSA Battle House Tower
