= Regions-Harbert Plaza =

32-story office building in Birmingham, Alabama

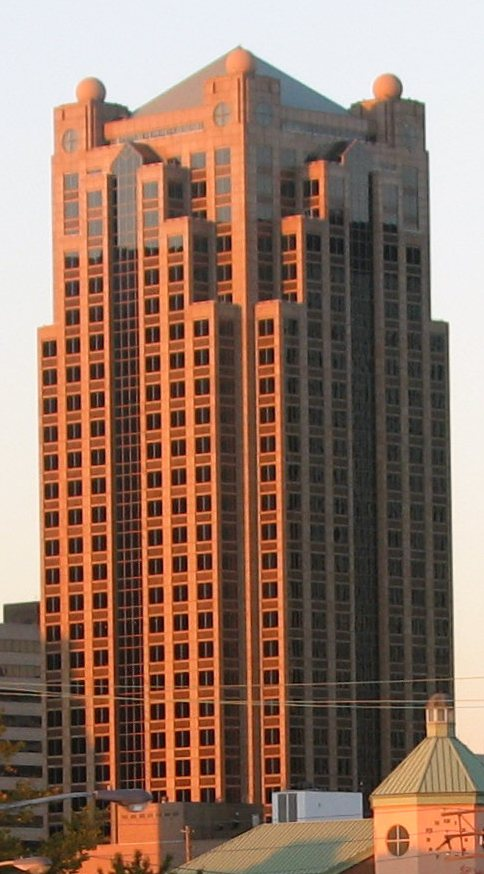
- Interactive map of the Regions-Harbert Plaza area

General information
- Status: Completed
- Type: Class-A Office Building
- Location: 1901 6th Avenue North Birmingham, Alabama, USA
- Construction started: 1987
- Completed: 1988
- Opening: 1989
- Cost: US$110 million
- Owner: S.L. Regions LLC; NKP Alabama Owner LLC

Height
- Antenna spire: 437 feet (133 m)
- Top floor: 32

Technical details
- Floor count: 32
- Floor area: 629,635 sq ft (58,495 m^{2})

Design and construction
- Architect: Hellmuth, Obata and Kassabaum
- Developer: Harbert Corporation
- Main contractor: Brasfield & Gorrie

The Regions-Harbert Plaza is a 32-story, 437-foot-tall (133 m) office building in Birmingham, Alabama. Originally known as the AmSouth-Harbert Plaza, it was renamed on July 13, 2007, after AmSouth Bancorporation - the building's largest tenant - merged with Birmingham-based Regions Financial Corporation. Today, the 200,000 square feet (19,000 m^{2}) that Regions leases makes it the building's largest tenant.

== History ==
Designed by the architectural firm Hellmuth, Obata & Kassabaum, the Plaza was built in 1989 by general contractor Brasfield & Gorrie as a multi-tenant office building for Harbert Corporation. Harbert owned the building until 2008, when the Harbert family sold it.

The building's base has a 70,000-square-foot (6,500 m^{2}) retail center and its foundation can accommodate a 8-story tower above the retail area. The building also connects to the adjacent Regions Center through the mezzanine level.

== Tenants ==
Major tenants include Regions Financial Corporation; law firms Balch & Bingham, Waller Lansden Dortch & Davis, LLP, Baker Donelson and Maynard Cooper & Gale; an IT Professional Services Firm Insight Global, the accounting firm Ernst & Young and Northwestern Mutual, and a custom clothier, John Armstrong Clothier. The 31st and 32nd floors contain the private City Club of Birmingham.

== See also ==
- List of tallest buildings in Birmingham, Alabama
