= AT&T City Center =

30-story office building in Birmingham, Alabama

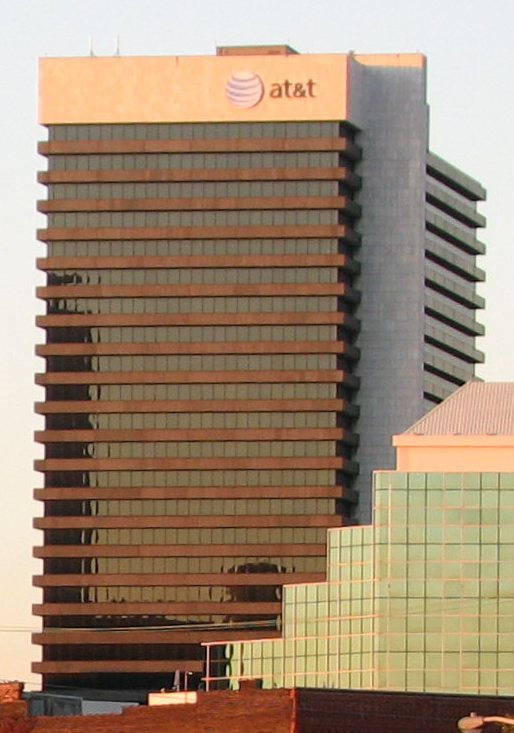
- Interactive map of the AT&T City Center area

General information
- Status: Completed
- Type: Class A Office Building
- Location: 600 19th Street North Birmingham, Alabama, US
- Coordinates: 33.5187°N 86.8112°W
- Opening: 1972
- Owner: VCP City Center

Height
- Antenna spire: 390 feet (119 m)
- Top floor: 30

Technical details
- Floor count: 30
- Floor area: 749,545 square feet (69,635 m^{2})

Design and construction
- Architects: Kahn & Jacobs; Warren, Knight, and Davis

The AT&T City Center is a 30-story, 390 foot (119 m) office building in Birmingham, Alabama. Completed in 1972, the building was originally known as the South Central Bell Building and was the corporate headquarters for South Central Bell and its five-state operating territory. The building was listed on the National Register of Historic Places in 2020.

In 1998 the building was renamed the BellSouth City Center after Brasfield & Gorrie completed an $80 million renovation. Bell South was merged into the current AT&T company in 2006, and the building's name was changed to AT&T City Center. Due to consolidations in corporate structure, AT&T moved all of its employees out of the building by March 2018. This coincided with announcements to consolidated executive positions in Dallas and Los Angeles.

In March 2018 the building was purchased by "600 North 19th Street LLC" of Stamford, Connecticut for $29.25 million. In November of the same year, it was sold to "VCP City Center" a joint venture of Varden Capital Properties of Atlanta, Georgia and Tellus Partners of Norcross, Georgia, for $31 million. The new owners anticipate redeveloping the building as a mixed-use property, combining residential, office and restaurant space. The building is now being converted into a residential apartment building named "The 600", to contain 404 luxury apartment units. Its 28th and 29th floors have been allotted for tenant amenities. A 600-space parking garage to the building's west will serve the tower's residents.

== See also ==
- List of tallest buildings in Birmingham, Alabama
