= Battle House Hotel =

- Battle House Royale
- U.S. National Register of Historic Places
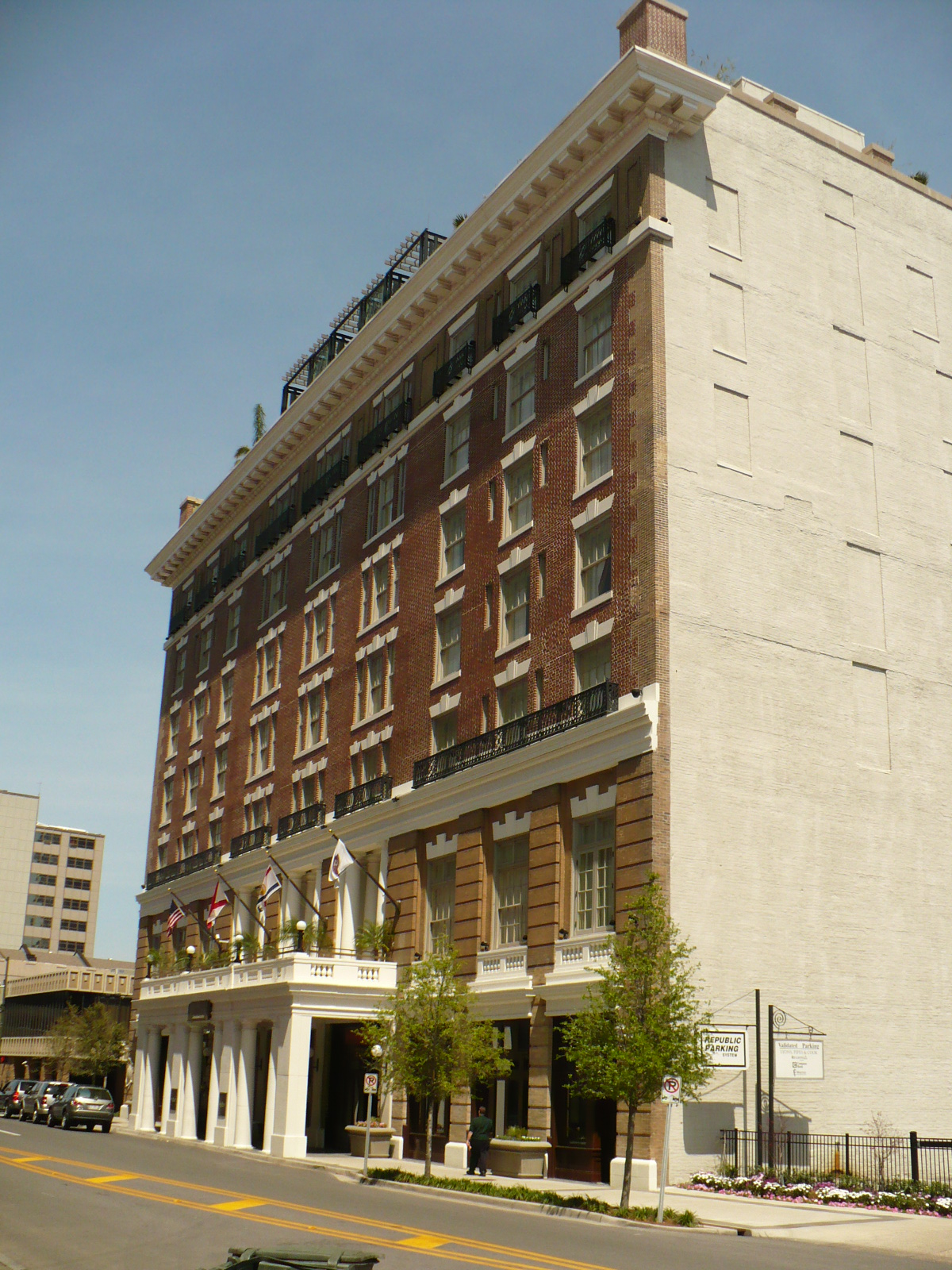
- View from the east on Royal Street in 2008

- Location within Mobile, Alabama Location within Alabama Location within the United States
- Location: 26 N. Royal St., Mobile, Alabama
- Coordinates: 30°41′35″N 88°2′27″W
- Area: 0.7 acres (0.28 ha)
- Built: 1906–08
- Architect: F. M. Andrews and Co.
- Architectural style: Georgian Revival
- NRHP reference No.: 75000322
- Added to NRHP: August 19, 1975

The Battle House Renaissance Mobile Hotel & Spa, is a historic hotel in Mobile, Alabama. The current structure was built in 1908 as the Battle House Hotel. It is the second hotel by that name to stand in this location, replacing an earlier Battle House built in 1852, which burned down in 1905. It is one of the earliest steel frame structures in Alabama.

== History ==
=== First Battle House Hotel ===
The first Battle House Hotel was opened by James Battle and his two half-nephews John and Samuel on November 13, 1852 on the site of a former military headquarters set up by Andrew Jackson during the War of 1812. The Battle brothers' new hotel was a 200-room four-story brick building, with a two-story gallery of cast iron. The site had been home to two other hotels in the years between Andrew Jackson and the Battle brothers, the Franklin Hotel and the Waverly Hotel. Both of these earlier structures had burned.

A particularly notable event for the hotel occurred when Stephen A. Douglas was a guest of the hotel the night that he lost the presidency to Abraham Lincoln. The first Battle House also had such notable guests as Henry Clay, Jefferson Davis, Millard Fillmore, Oscar Wilde and Winfield Scott. A National Weather Service station was established at the Battle House in 1880 and electric lighting was added in 1884. The hotel was renovated in 1900. Then, after more than 50 years in service, the hotel burned to the ground on February 12, 1905.

=== Modern Battle House Hotel ===
After the fire, the proprietors hired Frank Mills Andrews of New York City to design a new structure and it was built out of steel and concrete. The new hotel reopened for business in 1908. The hotel remained a prominent fixture of Mobile through the first and second World Wars. Woodrow Wilson stayed at the Battle House in 1913. It was while he was at the Battle House that he made his famous statement that "the United States will never again seek one additional foot of territory by conquest". The hotel was renovated in 1916 and again in 1949, with air-conditioning added in all guest rooms and public spaces at that time.

Sheraton Hotels bought the Battle House in 1958 and operated it as the Sheraton-Battle House until 1968, when they sold it to Gotham Hotels, along with seventeen other aging properties, and the hotel regained its original name. In May 1973, it was bought by local citizens, who renamed it the Battle House Royale and planned a complete renovation. However, the hotel was unsuccessful and closed its doors in 1974, remaining closed for the next 30 years. The empty Battle House Royale building was added to the National Register of Historic Places in 1975. By 1980 it was the only building left completely intact in its city block. In 2003, Retirement Systems of Alabama began restoration of the hotel, along with the construction of an adjoining skyscraper office building, which also includes additional hotel rooms on its lower floors, the RSA Battle House Tower. The 2-year historic restoration was undertaken by Smith Dalia Architects, in collaboration with TVSA for the tower design. The hotel reopened on May 11, 2007 as The Battle House Renaissance Mobile Hotel & Spa.

The hotel is a member of Historic Hotels of America, the official program of the National Trust for Historic Preservation.

== Description ==
The eight-story building is steel frame with marble and brick facings. At street level it features a projecting one-story portico with paired Tuscan columns; the level above the portico has recessed Tuscan loggias with individual window balustrades. A wide third-story molded entablature is surmounted by cast iron balconies. The window openings over the entire facade have articulated keystones and the openings on the seventh level also feature cast iron balconies. The roof level features a molded projecting cornice with scroll brackets.

The hotel lobby features a domed skylight, dating back to 1908. The ceiling and walls feature elaborate plasterwork and are also painted using the trompe-l'œil technique. The walls are painted with portraits of Louis XIV of France, George III of Great Britain, Ferdinand V of Castile, and George Washington.

The Trellis Room, located on the lobby floor, currently houses a restaurant with a four-diamond rating. The restaurant serves Northern Italian cuisine. The restaurant seats 90 and features a full-view kitchen so patrons can watch the chefs prepare their meals. The Trellis Room ceiling is barrel vaulted with a Tiffany glass skylight.

The lobby floor also hosts the Crystal Ballroom, which is known as "Mobile's First Harvest". At one time it was the hotel's restaurant. The room has been restored to vintage colors, as it was in 1908. It features ornate plasterwork with an agricultural theme. The Battle House was a favorite place for southern planters to get away to once their crops were planted. The Crystal Ballroom is now used for social events such as weddings, meetings, and Mardi Gras balls. The first Mardi Gras ball to be held at the Battle House was The Strikers Ball in 1852. At that time the balls were part of the New Year celebration.

== See also ==
- List of Historic Hotels of America
