= Mobile Government Plaza =

High-rise building in Mobile, Alabama, US

Government Plaza
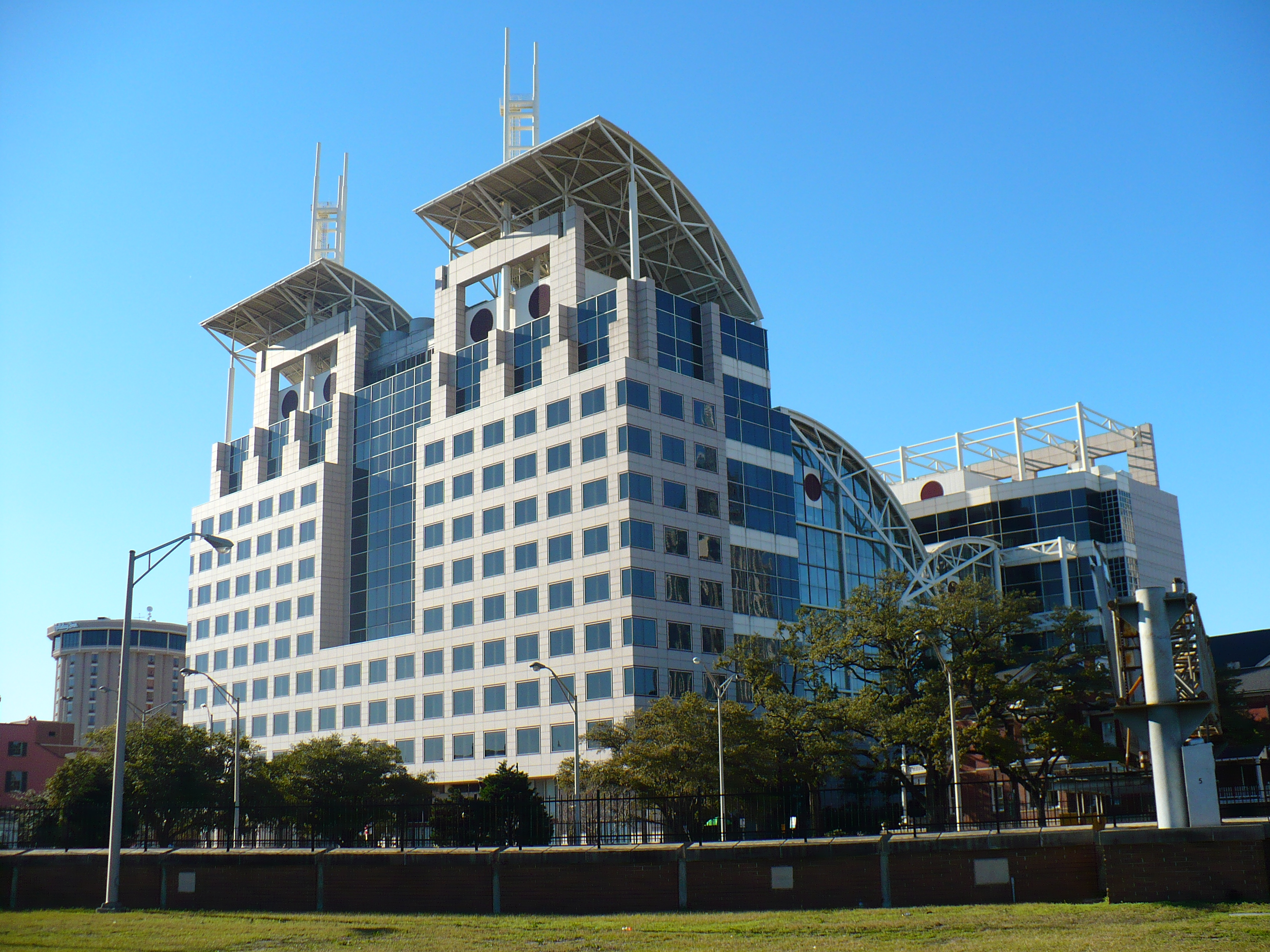
- Interactive map of the Government Plaza area

General information
- Status: Completed
- Type: City Hall, Government, Office
- Architectural style: Postmodern
- Location: 205 Government Street, Mobile, Alabama
- Coordinates: 30°41′21.65″N 88°2′32.49″W
- Completed: 1994
- Opening: 1994
- Renovated: 2014
- Cost: $73 million
- Renovation cost: $3.5 million
- Owner: Mobile County

Height
- Roof: 325 feet (99 m)

Technical details
- Floor count: 12
- Lifts/elevators: 4 (judicial tower)

Design and construction
- Architects: Frederick C. Woods & Associates, Golemon & Rolfe Associates
- Developer: City of Mobile

Mobile Government Plaza is a high-rise in the U.S. city of Mobile, Alabama. The building is owned by Mobile County Commission and has several tenants including the City of Mobile and local courts. Completed in 1994 at a cost of US$73 million, the building rises 325 feet (99 m) and 12 stories at its highest point. The roof of the building is the site of two twin architectural spires that are included in the tower's overall structural height. Government Plaza is tied with the Mobile Marriott as the 4th-tallest building in Mobile and the 10th-tallest in Alabama. It also stands as the tallest government building in the state.

== Design ==
Government Plaza was designed by Harry Goleman and Mario Bolullo of Houston, in cooperation with Mobile architect Frederick C. Woods. Their design was selected from among 195 entries in a national competition sponsored by the American Institute of Architects. The 581,000-square-foot (54,000 m^{2}) facility comprises a 12-story administration tower and a 9-story judicial tower, connected by a massive 50,000-square-foot (4,600 m^{2}) glass-enclosed atrium. It was the first government structure in the United States to combine county and municipal governments and the court system in one space. Designed to evoke a nautical feel appropriate to Mobile's status as a seaport, the building is an example of postmodernist style architecture.

In August 2015, the Mobile County Commission proposed a series of renovations to the building, including improvements to the exterior, auditorium, atrium, and 10th floor.

=== Atrium repairs ===
The atrium roof's initial 1994 design and construction, especially the skylight, led to leaks during heavy rain. A fix was attempted in 2004 but failed. In August 2013, after worsening leaks, a $3.2 million contract was awarded to replace the roof; these repairs made to the atrium – completed in 2014 – made the roof "leak free", according to the Mobile County Commission. However, in December 2016, an architect was hired to fix another series of leaks.

== Renaming resolution ==
On October 29, 2013, the Mobile City Council voted unanimously to pass a resolution renaming the building the Samuel L. Jones Government Plaza in honor of the outgoing mayor. This resolution was passed during the last City Council meeting over which Mayor Sam Jones presided. However, renaming the building required approval from the Mobile County Commission, which never happened. Mobile County government continues to refer to the building as "Mobile Government Plaza" or "Government Plaza."

== See also ==
- List of tallest buildings in Mobile
- List of tallest buildings in Alabama
