= RSA Battle House Tower =

Building in Mobile, Alabama

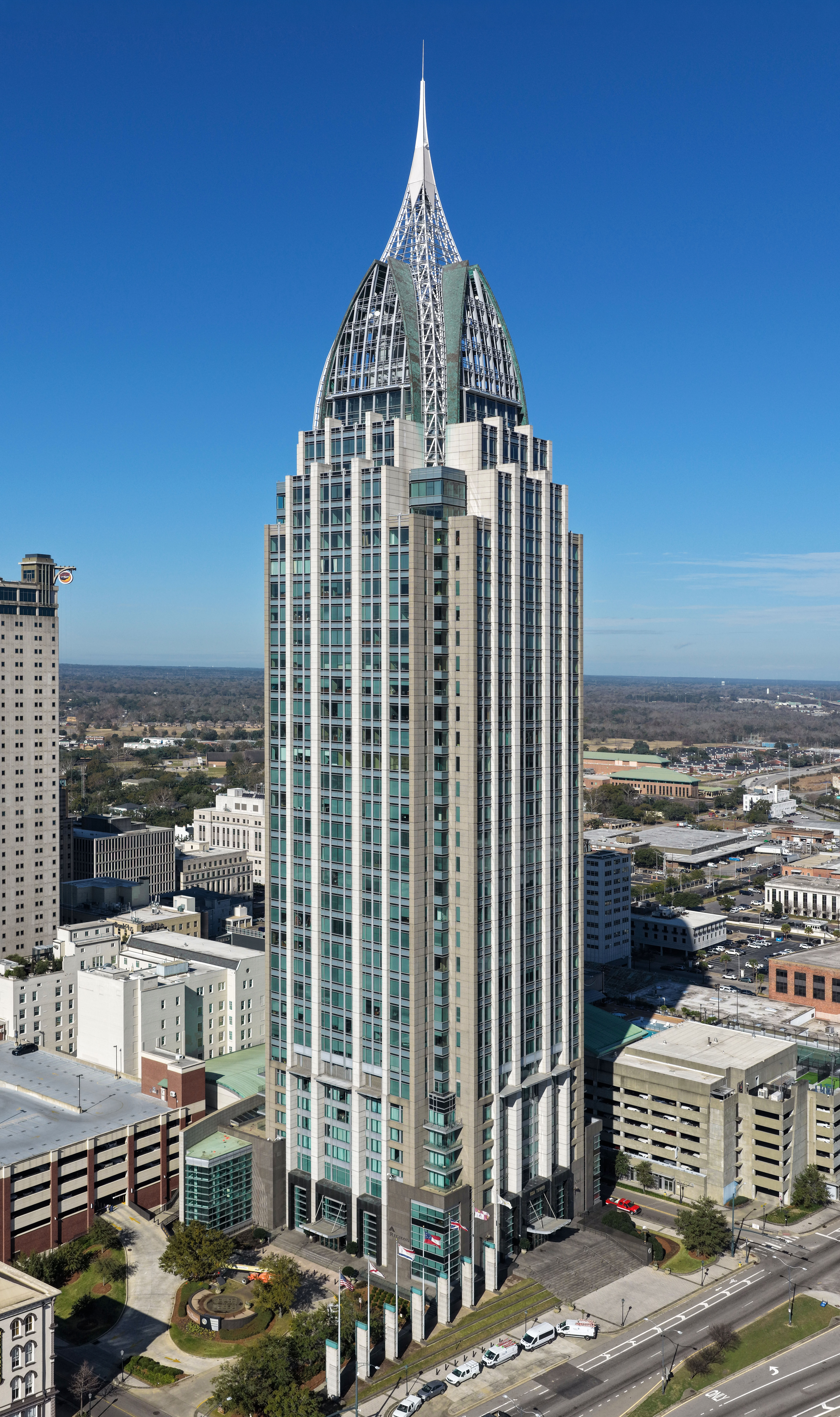
- The tower in 2026

General information
- Status: Completed
- Type: Skyscraper
- Location: 11 North Water Street; Mobile, Alabama, U.S.
- Coordinates: 30°41′35.22″N 88°2′22.83″W
- Construction started: 7 November 2003
- Completed: 16 September 2006
- Opening: 11 May 2007
- Cost: $220 Million
- Owner: Retirement Systems of Alabama

Height
- Antenna spire: 745 feet (227 m)
- Roof: 670 feet (204 m)

Technical details
- Floor count: 35
- Floor area: 534,268 square feet (49,635 m^{2})
- Lifts/elevators: 30

Design and construction
- Architect: TVS Associates

Website
- www.rsa-al.gov/real-estate/office-building-portfolio/battle-house-tower/

The RSA Battle House Tower is located in Mobile, Alabama and is Alabama's tallest building. The building is owned by the Retirement Systems of Alabama (RSA). It is the tallest on the Gulf Coast of the United States outside Houston. It replaces the Shipt Tower in Birmingham as the tallest building in Alabama and the RSA Trustmark Building as the tallest in Mobile. The building is named for the neighboring Battle House Hotel, which is now part of the tower complex. The Battle House Hotel was restored and renovated as part of the tower project.

== Construction ==
The building began with foundation slab concrete being poured during the weekend of 7 November 2003. The foundation slab is over 7 feet (2.1 m) thick, with just over 5 feet (1.5 m) of it resting below the natural water table of downtown Mobile. The spire, installed by a Sikorsky S-61 helicopter on Saturday, 16 September 2006, brought the building to its finished height of 745 feet (227 m). During construction, five hurricanes affected Mobile, causing delays in the construction of this building: Hurricane Frances and Hurricane Ivan in 2004, as well as Hurricane Cindy, Hurricane Dennis, and Hurricane Katrina in 2005.

== Facilities ==
The tower consists of 25 office floors, 3 lobby floors, 4 hotel floors, and 1 service floor, together with 30 elevators and 534,268 square feet (49,635 m^{2}) of column-free floorspace and a total building area of 189,644 sq.ft The lighted crown is visible from 30 miles (48 km) away along Mobile Bay on a clear night.

== See also ==
- List of tallest buildings in Mobile
- List of tallest buildings in Alabama

Preceded by Wachovia Tower	Tallest Building in Alabama; 2007—Present; 227m	Succeeded by None
Preceded by RSA–BankTrust Building	Tallest Building in Mobile; 2007—Present; 227m	Succeeded by None
