= RSA Trustmark Building =

Office tower in Mobile, Alabama, US

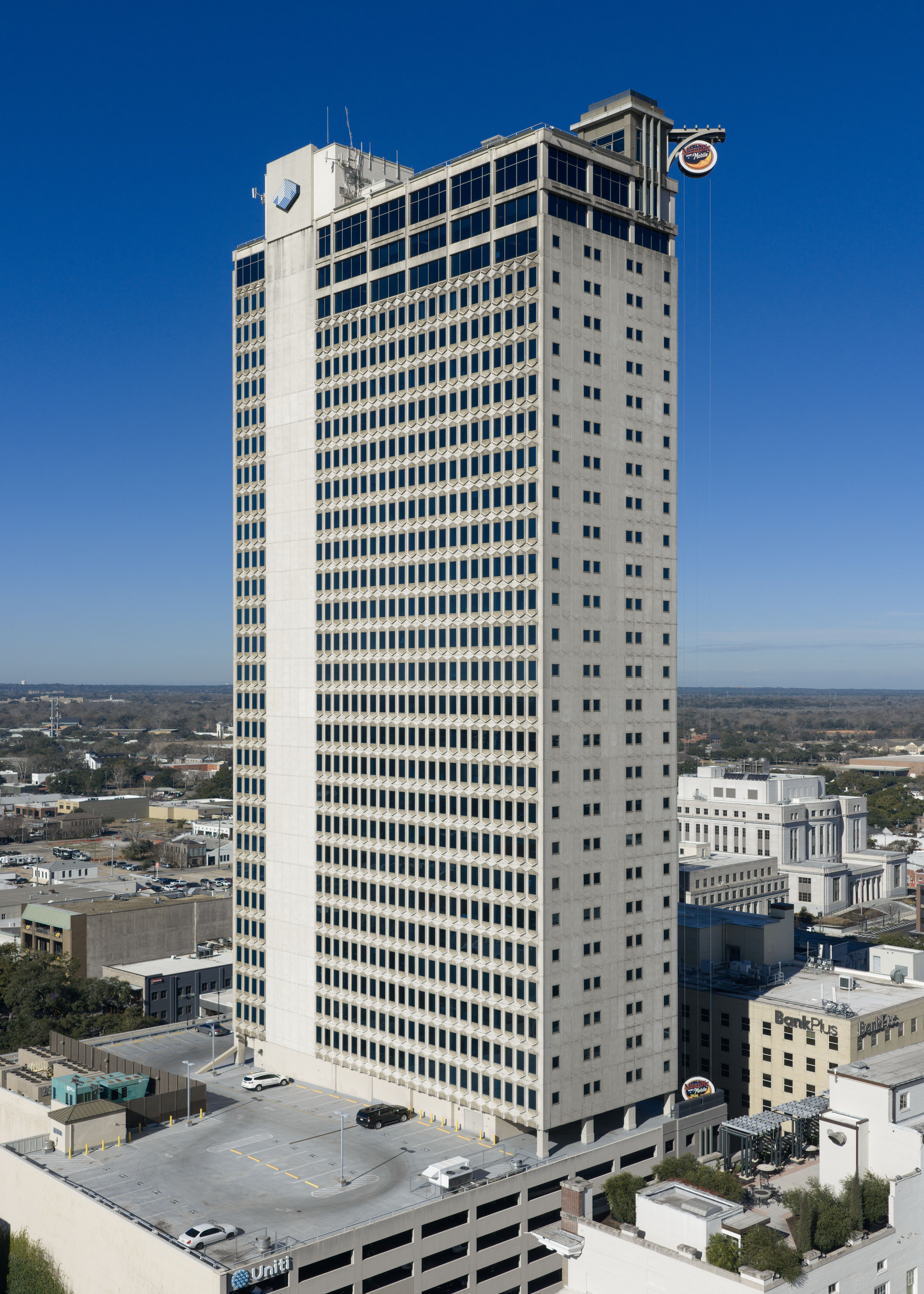
- The building in 2026
- Interactive map of the RSA Trustmark Building area

General information
- Status: Completed
- Type: Office
- Location: 107 St. Francis Street Mobile, Alabama, US
- Coordinates: 30°41′34.16″N 88°2′28.86″W
- Completed: 1965
- Owner: Retirement Systems of Alabama
- Management: Retirement Systems of Alabama

Height
- Tip: 147.5 m / 484 ft
- Roof: 424 feet (129 m)

Technical details
- Floor count: 34
- Floor area: 283,995 square feet (26,384 m^{2})

The RSA Trustmark Building, originally the First National Bank Building, is a 34-story, 424-foot (129 m) International Style office tower located in downtown Mobile, Alabama. Most recently known as the AmSouth Bank Building, it had been named in honor of its largest tenant until 2006, AmSouth Bancorporation. It was renamed the GM Building by its new owner, Retirement Systems of Alabama, in 2009. Following a lease agreement with BancTrust Financial Group and its community bank subsidiary, BankTrust, it was renamed again, this time to the RSA–BankTrust Building. BancTrust Financial Group was purchased in 2013 by Trustmark Corporation, a Mississippi-based financial institution. The building officially became the RSA Trustmark Building. Trustmark occupies 72,000 square feet (6,700 m^{2}) of the tower, including the lobby floor and floors 25 through 31.

== History ==
Both the original First National Bank building (built 1913) and the three-story Neo-Renaissance style U.S. Customs House (built 1853) were demolished in 1963 to clear the site for the new building. The office tower was completed in 1965 and was the tallest building in Alabama from that time until 1986, when it was surpassed by the SouthTrust Tower in Birmingham. It remained the tallest building in Mobile until the completion of the RSA Battle House Tower in 2007. It was temporarily the 2nd-tallest building in Mobile and the 4th-tallest building in Alabama for roughly a year until renovation of the Renaissance Hotel was completed in 2008 with the addition of a spire, which raised that building's height to 536 feet (136 m) from its previous height of 277 feet (84 m).

The building was acquired by Retirement Systems of Alabama in February 2009 and subsequently renamed. Plans for an interior and exterior renovation were announced in November 2009. The architectural firm of Goodwyn, Mills & Cawood performed the design and engineering work. The plans called for upgrading the interior office space from Class C to Class B. Exterior changes included replacing all windows with longer, mirror-tinted versions. The renovations were completed by March 2011. The tower also features a restaurant (Dauphin's) on the 34th floor that offers panoramic views of the Mobile area.

== See also ==
- List of tallest buildings in Mobile, Alabama

Preceded by City Federal Building	Tallest Building in Alabama; 1965–1986; 129m	Succeeded by Wachovia Tower
Preceded by Regions Bank Building	Tallest Building in Mobile; 1965–2007; 129m	Succeeded by RSA Battle House Tower
