= City Federal Building =

Skyscraper located on Second Avenue North in Birmingham, Alabama

Coordinates: 33.516°N 86.805°W

City Federal Building

The City Federal Building (originally the Comer Building) is a skyscraper located on Second Avenue North in Birmingham, Alabama. It was built in 1913 and was designed by architect William C. Weston. It stands 27 stories or 325 feet on the Birmingham skyline.

At the time it was completed it was the tallest building in the Southeast. It was the tallest building in Alabama from 1913 to 1969, and the tallest in Birmingham, Alabama until 1972. Currently, it is the 5th tallest building in Birmingham. It is still the tallest neoclassical building in the south. The penthouse suite of the building was the longtime home of WSGN Radio, at 610 AM, once one of the most powerful and popular Top 40 radio stations in the south. It has since been converted into commercial space and high end condominiums. On December 14, 2005, the City Federal Building's famous red neon sign was re-lit for the first time since the mid-1990s, signaling the building's renewal. The building was an early precursor to the revival of Birmingham's North Side district and the resurgence of 2nd Ave North.

== Cultural references ==
Birmingham soul band St. Paul and The Broken Bones included a song named "City Federal Building" on their 2023 album Angels in Science Fiction.
