= William C. Weston =

New Zealand-born architect who worked in Birmingham, Alabama, and Detroit, Michigan

- Born: April 28, 1866; Wellington, New Zealand
- Died: September 19, 1932 (aged 66); Detroit
- Occupation: Architect
- Practice: William C. Weston; Weston & Smith; Weston & Ellington

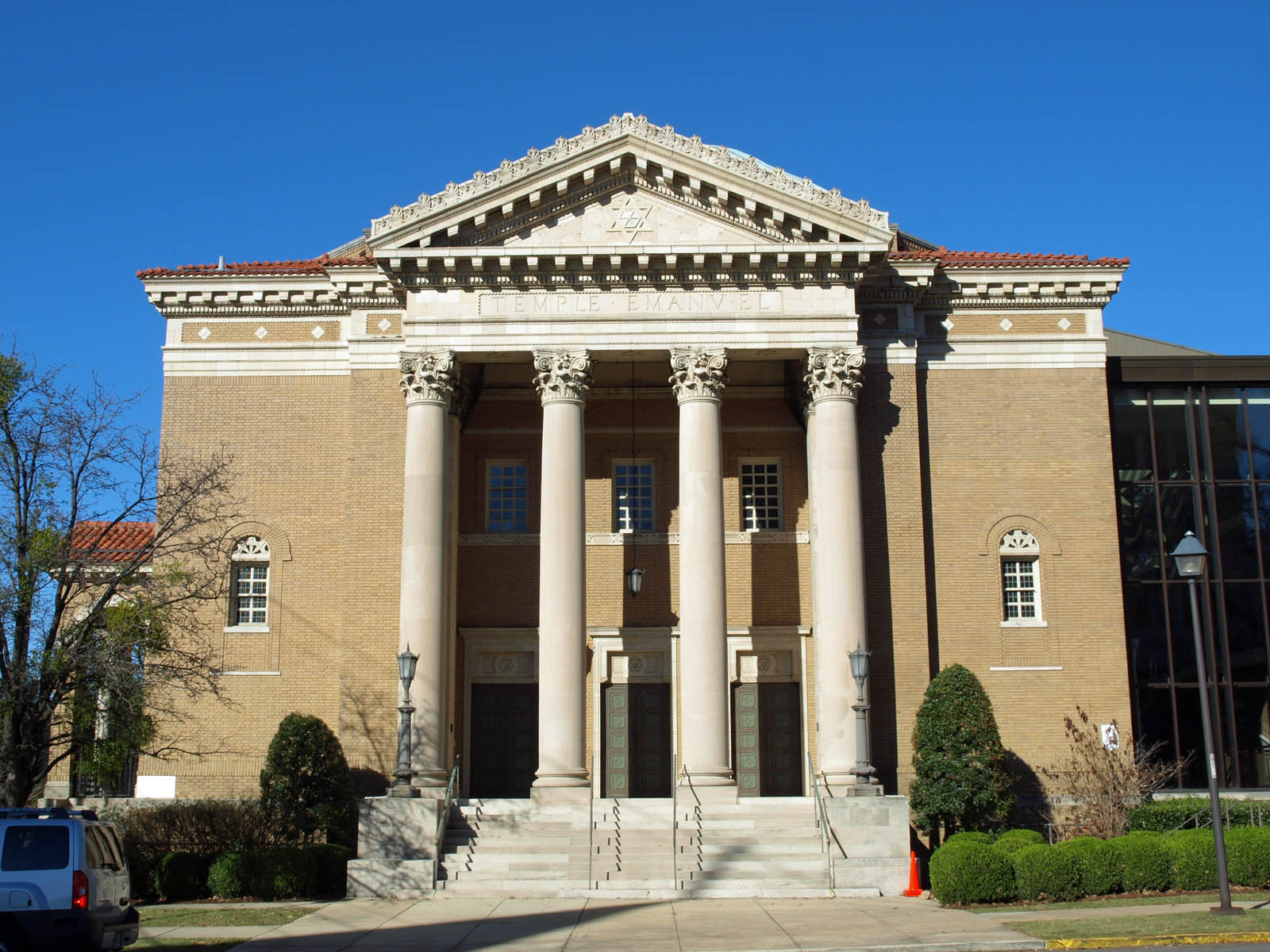
Temple Emanu-El in Birmingham, designed by Weston and completed in 1912.

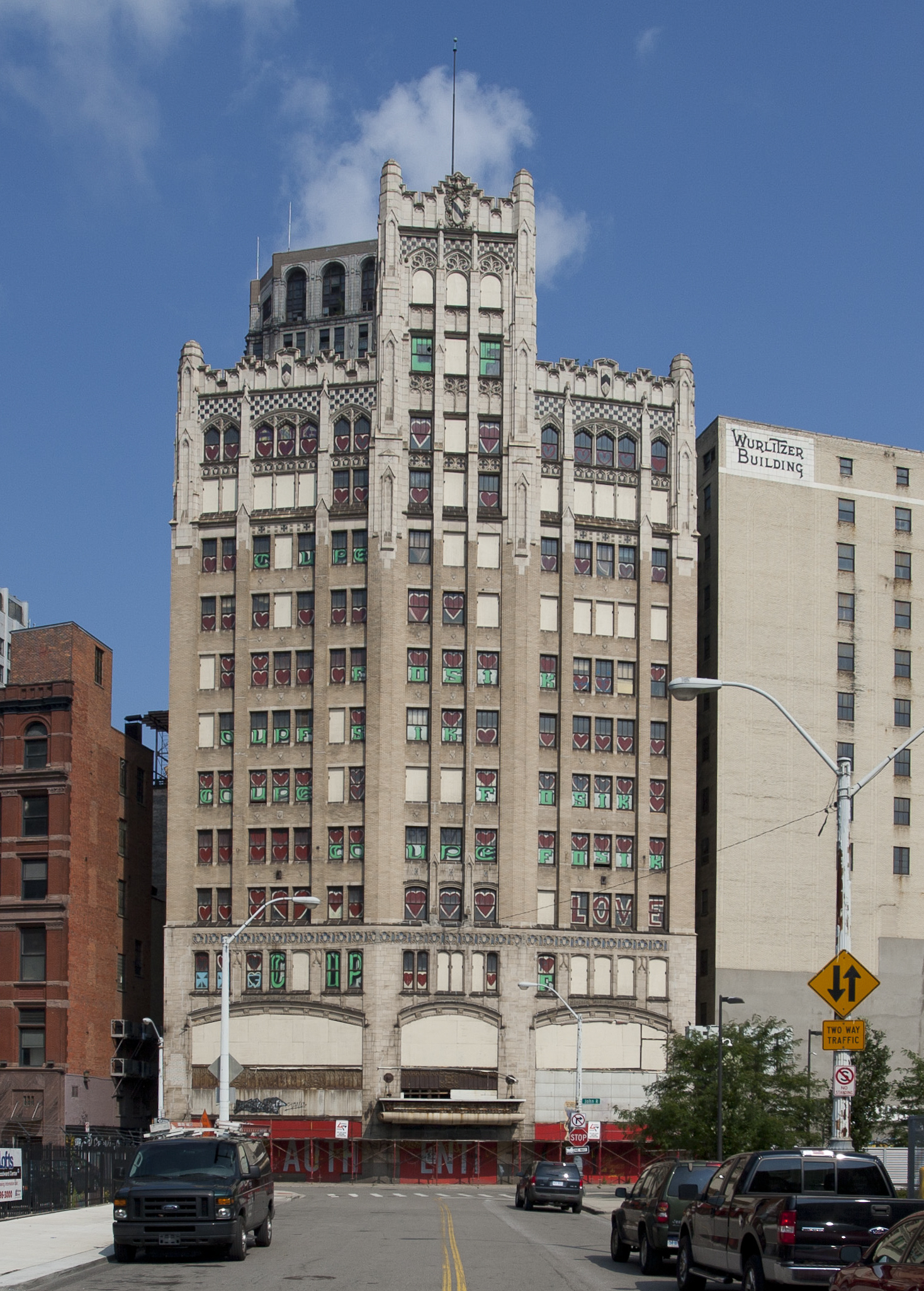
The Metropolitan Building in Detroit, designed by Weston & Ellington and completed in 1925.

William C. Weston AIA (April 28, 1866 – September 19, 1932) was a New Zealand-born American architect. Weston practiced architecture in Birmingham, Alabama from 1901 until 1915 and in Detroit until his death in 1932.

== Life and career ==
William Crowley Weston was born April 28, 1866, in Wellington, New Zealand. He immigrated to the United States at the age of 19. He was trained as an architect in the office of D. H. Burnham & Company in Chicago, and in other offices, before opening his own office in Birmingham, Alabama in 1901. His first work in Birmingham was the Woodward Building (1902), which he designed in association with Stone Brothers Ltd., architects of New Orleans.

In 1915 Weston moved to Detroit. Despite his success in Birmingham he found little work there, and closed his office during World War I. In 1922 he reopened his office and formed the partnership of Weston & Smith. This lasted only until 1923, when he formed the new partnership of Weston & Ellington. His new partner, Harold S. Ellington, had previously been the Detroit representative of Giaver & Dinkelberg of Chicago, architects of Grand Park Centre (1922). The firm of Weston & Ellington was chiefly responsible for industrial buildings but also designed non-industrial projects, including the Metropolitan Building (1925). The partnership was dissolved upon Weston's death in 1932. After his death Ellington formed the partnership of Harley & Ellington with architect Alvin E. Harley. This firm is still active under the name Harley Ellis Devereaux.

In 1912 Weston was joined by Eugene H. Knight, a former employee, as chief assistant and minority partner. After Weston's move to Detroit, Knight took over the office under his own name. In 1917 he merged the office with that of William T. Warren to form the partnership of Warren & Knight.

== Personal life ==
Weston was married in 1899. He died September 19, 1932 in Detroit at the age of 66. He was survived by his widow, Louise Gertrude Weston, and a daughter.

== Architectural works ==
- 1902 – Woodward Building, (Note: Designed by Stone Brothers Ltd. and William C. Weston, associated architects.) (Note: NRHP-listed.) Birmingham, Alabama
- 1903 – Frank Nelson Building, (Note: A contributing resource to the Downtown Birmingham Historic District, NRHP-listed in 1982 and expanded in 1985, 1998 and 2016.) 201 20th St N, Birmingham, Alabama
- 1903 – Title Building, 300 Richard Arrington Jr Blvd N, Birmingham, Alabama
- 1905 – Birmingham Realty Company building, (Note: A contributing resource to the Morris Avenue–First Avenue North Historic District, NRHP-listed in 1986.) 2118 1st Ave N, Birmingham, Alabama
- 1906 – Brown-Marx Building, 2000 1st Ave N, Birmingham, Alabama
- 1907 – Terrace Court, 1124 20th St S, Birmingham, Alabama
- 1908 – Wimberly-Thomas Warehouse, 1809 1st Ave S, Birmingham, Alabama
- 1910 – Age-Herald Building, 2107 5th Ave N, Birmingham, Alabama
- 1912 – Temple Emanu-El, 2100 Highland Ave, Birmingham, Alabama
- 1913 – City Federal Building, 2024 2nd Ave N, Birmingham, Alabama
- 1914 – Otto Marx house, (Note: Demolished.) 2600 Highland Ave, Birmingham, Alabama
- 1918 – Bearings Service Company building, 4145-4161 Cass Ave, Detroit
- 1925 – Metropolitan Building, 33 John R St, Detroit
- 1926 – Fort Wayne Hotel, 408 Temple Ave, Detroit
- 1926 – The Park Shelton, 15 East Kirby St, Detroit

Weston designed two of the four buildings at the so-called Heaviest Corner on Earth in Birmingham, both of which were the tallest buildings in the state at the time of their construction.
