= Nolan Bailey Harmon =

American historian

Nolan Bailey Harmon (July 14, 1892 – June 8, 1993) was an American bishop of The Methodist Church and the United Methodist Church, elected in 1956.

== Birth and death ==
Nolan Bailey Harmon was born July 14, 1892, in Meridian, Mississippi, and died on June 8, 1993, one month before his 101st birthday. His funeral was held four days later at Druid Hills United Methodist Church. He was buried in the Evergreen Burial Park in Roanoke, Virginia.

He was the son, grandson and great-grandson of Methodist Preachers. He was elected a bishop of The Methodist Church and United Methodist Church in 1956. Harmon's wife, Rebecca (Lamar) Harmon, died at age 84 in 1980. His children were Nolan B. Harmon III and G. Lamar Harmon.

== Education ==
Nolan graduated from Millsaps College in Mississippi. He was a member of the first class of the Candler School of Theology, Emory University in 1914. He also earned a Master of Arts degree from Princeton University in 1920. He received honorary degrees from Millsaps, Hamline University, Western Maryland College, Mount Union College and Wofford College. In 1958, he received an honorary D.D. degree from Emory.

== Career ==
In 1940, Harmon was elected book editor of the newly reunited Methodist Church. He edited publications of Abingdon Press and the journal Religion in Life. He also was general editor of the twelve volume Interpreters Bible. Between 1960 and 1964, Bishop Harmon was a member of The Hymnal Committee of his denomination, serving as chairman of the Subcommittee on Texts.

He was elected by the Southeastern Jurisdiction Conference of The Methodist Church. As a bishop, he presided over the work of various Annual Conferences in the Southeastern United States. He retired from the active episcopacy in 1964. In retirement he edited the Encyclopedia of World Methodism. Also in retirement, Bishop Harmon served on the faculty of Emory University as a visiting professor, continuing there into his 96th year. Further into his retirement, Nolan taught classes on government and history of Methodists.

== Civil rights involvement ==
In April 1963, Harmon made civil rights history when he, along with seven other white clergymen (including fellow-Methodist Bishop Paul Hardin Jr.), released a statement calling on African Americans to stop taking part in demonstrations initiated by the Rev. Dr. Martin Luther King Jr. The statement, titled "A Call for Unity", called the demonstrations "unwise and untimely", and argued that change should be pursued through negotiation and judicial action. This statement motivated Dr. King to write his famous "Letter from Birmingham Jail". In his 1983 autobiography, Bishop Harmon referred to the letter as a "propaganda move", but also wrote that he "certainly gave [King] his due as a brave man fighting off ages of evil".

In June 1963, Bishop Harmon spoke out after segregationist Governor George Wallace attempted to block the enrollment of black students at the University of Alabama, also known as the "Stand in the Schoolhouse Door". Bishop Harmon read a public protest of Wallace's actions during an Annual Conference, calling them a "moral mistake" and adding that "the sovereignty of the United States [...] has been exerted to see that fundamental human rights are maintained in our state universities and state schools". However, Harmon also criticised "the type of lawless agitation carried on in Birmingham recently by certain Negro leaders". His words were published in local newspapers.

== Autobiography ==
- Harmon, Nolan Bailey, Ninety Years and Counting. Upper Room: Nashville, TN (1983); ISBN 0835804534.

== Selected writings ==
- Ministerial Ethics and Etiquette
- The Famous Case of Myra Clark Gaines
- General Editor, Encyclopedia of World Methodism, Nashville: United Methodist Publishing House, 1974.
- General Editor, Interpreters Bible
- Understanding the Methodist Church
- Doctrines and Discipline of the Methodist Church, 1948
- The Pastors Ideal Funeral Manual
- The Encyclopedia of World Methodism, volume 1
- The Encyclopedia of World Methodism, volume 2
- The Organization of the Methodist Church: Historic Development and Present Working Structure

== See also ==
- List of bishops of the United Methodist Church

== Sources ==
- The Council of Bishops of the United Methodist Church
- InfoServ, the official information service of The United Methodist Church.
