= Edward V. Ramage =

- Born: Edward V. Ramage; October 2, 1908; Weaverville, North Carolina
- Died: December 1981 (aged 73)
- Other names: The Reverend Edward V. Ramage
- Education: Doctor of Divinity
- Alma mater: Columbia Theological Seminary in Decatur, Georgia
- Known for: Synod of the Alabama Presbyterian Church in the United States; One of the eight Alabama clergymen to write A Call for Unity
- Parent(s): Elizabeth Jane Vandiver (Mother); Samuel Johnson Ramage (Father)

Edward V. Ramage (October 2, 1908 – December 1981) was a minister of the Presbyterian Church in the United States in Alabama.

== Early life ==
Edward Ramage was born October 2, 1908, in Weaverville, North Carolina, to Samuel Johnson Ramage (d. 1917) and Elizabeth Jane Vandiver. He was one of three children.

== Education ==
Edward Ramage is listed as a Doctor of Divinity. However, it is unclear whether Ramage ever obtained a degree. He bounced around colleges, first Davidson College in North Carolina, next Emory University near Atlanta, then back to Davidson, and returning again to Emory before he attended the conservative Columbia Theological Seminary in Decatur, Georgia. According to officials at Columbia, Ramage completed his senior year of study, but the seminary had no record of an actual degree conferred.

== Ministry ==
After months of struggling to make ends meet he received a job offer during September 1932 to pastor three churches, Main Street, Lindale, and Barkers, scattered over thirty miles of countryside in and around the northwest Georgia town of Rome.

From his pastorate in Georgia, Ramage moved on to lead congregations in Decatur, Alabama, and Oklahoma City, Oklahoma, before he received the call from First Presbyterian of Birmingham in 1946. Ramage was a Moderator of the Alabama Synod of the Presbyterian Church in the United States.

He was one of the eight Alabama clergymen to write and sign "A Call for Unity," criticizing Dr. Martin Luther King Jr. for demonstrations in response to segregation. In response, Dr. King wrote "Letter from Birmingham Jail."

During the height of the civil rights tensions in Birmingham, Alabama, pressure from segregationists within his own congregation convinced Ramage to leave his longtime pastorate and pursue a ministry elsewhere.

== Sources ==
- Blessed Are the Peacemakers, S. Jonathan Bass, Louisiana State University Press, 2001
- Blessed Are the Peacemakers: Martin Luther King, Jr., Eight White Religious Leaders, and the "Letter from Birmingham Jail"
