= Grafman =

Grafman is a surname. Notable people with the surname include:

- Jordan Grafman (born 1950), American neuropsychologist
- Milton Grafman (1907–1995), American rabbi
