= Why We Can't Wait =

1964 book by Martin Luther King Jr.

- First edition
- Author: Martin Luther King Jr.
- Publisher: Harper & Row
- Publication date: 1964

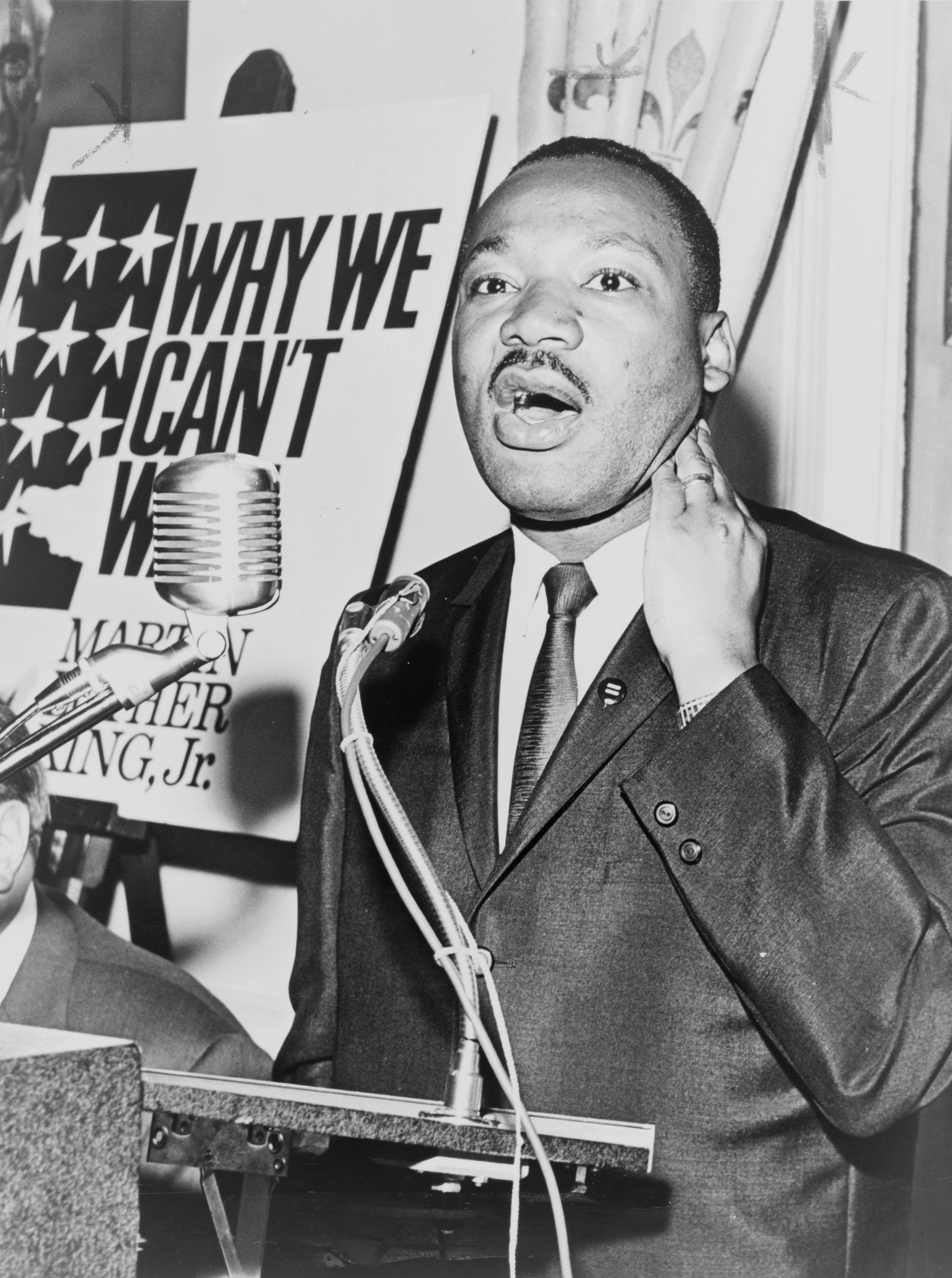
King at a press conference on June 8, 1964

Why We Can't Wait is a 1964 book by Martin Luther King Jr. about the nonviolent movement against racial segregation in the United States, and specifically the 1963 Birmingham campaign. The book describes 1963 as a landmark year in the civil rights movement, and as the beginning of America's "Negro Revolution".

== Writing ==
The seed of the book is King's "Letter from Birmingham Jail". The letter became nationally known and received interest from the New York publishing world, which Stanley Levison relayed to King in May 1963. Soon after, Levison made a deal with New American Library publisher Victor Weybright, who suggested that the theme of not waiting be used for the title. Weybright also gave permission for "Letter from Birmingham Jail" to be republished in national newspapers and magazines; it appeared in July 1963 as "Why the Negro Won't Wait".

King began working on the book later in 1963, with assistance from Levison and Clarence Jones. Some early work on the text was done by Al Duckett (also a participant in the movement). King and Levison eventually dismissed Duckett and then Nat Lamar, and Levison did some work on the text himself. Bayard Rustin also contributed, as did editor Hermine I. Popper.

Rustin said: "I don't want to write something for somebody where I know he is acting like a puppet. I want to be a real ghost and write what the person wants to say. And that is what I always knew was true in the case of Martin. I would never write anything that wasn't what he wanted to say. I understood him well enough."

The book largely reproduces the text of "Letter from Birmingham Jail", with some editorial changes. King writes in a footnote: "Although the text remains in substance unaltered, I have indulged in the author's prerogative in polishing it for publication."

Why We Can't Wait was published by Harper & Row in July 1964. The paperback edition cost 60¢.

== Outline ==
The book describes 1963 as the beginning of "the Negro revolution". It seeks to describe the historical events that led up to this revolution, and to explain why this revolution was nonviolent. King seeks to describe this history because of how quickly it has become visible to America at large, and because of its importance in events to come. He writes:

Just as lightning makes no sound until it strikes, the Negro Revolution generated quietly. But when it struck, the revealing flash of its power and the impact of its sincerity and fervor displayed a force of a frightening intensity. Three hundred years of humiliation, abuse, and deprivation cannot be expected to find voice in a whisper. [...]
Because there is more to come; because American society is bewildered by the spectacle of the Negro in revolt; because the dimensions are vast and the implications deep in a nation with twenty million Negroes, it is important to understand the history that is being made today.

=== Why 1963? ===
King gives several reasons why the Negro Revolution erupted in 1963:

- Disillusionment with the slow speed of school desegregation after Brown v. Board (1954).
- Lack of confidence in politicians and government, particularly after the perceived failures of the Kennedy administration. These included a weak stance on housing discrimination and a lack of support for Black voting rights in the South.
- Decolonization of Africa (and of Asia), and the international perception of the American Negro as downtrodden and powerless.
- The centennial of the 1863 Emancipation Proclamation reminded Blacks that they remained oppressed in spite of their nominal legal freedom.
- The Great Depression never ended for African Americans; while others enjoyed an economic recovery, Black unemployment rose. King says that economic inequality in America became particularly obvious in 1963.
- The rise to prominence of nonviolent direct action as a means for demanding change.

=== Nonviolent resistance ===
King goes on to describe why nonviolent resistance was so powerful. One of its major strengths involved changing the function of jails in society. Previously, the jail was used as an element of intimidation: authorities used the threat of pain and isolation in jail to control many separate individuals. Large groups of demonstrators, however, had the power to fill up jails—and to politicize the act of being jailed, thereby making jail less of a punishment. He condemns tokenism as an act of deception that offers false pride without real power: "The Negro wanted to feel pride in his race. With tokenism, the solution was simple. If all twenty million Negroes would keep looking at Ralph Bunche, the one man in so exalted a post would generate such a volume of pride that it could be cut into portions and served to everyone." King distinguishes between tokenism and a "modest start" to equality, writing that tokenism serves to stifle dissent and protest, not to start a process.

He criticizes other approaches to social change for Blacks, including the quietism of Booker T. Washington, the elitism of W. E. B. Du Bois's appeal to The Talented Tenth, the Pan-Africanism of Marcus Garvey, and the litigation of the National Association for the Advancement of Colored People (NAACP). King argues that none of these leaders and philosophies held the promise of real mass change for all African Americans.

=== Birmingham ===
King describes "Bull Connor's Birmingham" as an anachronistic city whose social order resembled colonial-era slavery. He writes that Blacks lack basic human rights, and are ruled by violence and terror.

He chronicles preliminary demonstrations held by the Alabama Christian Movement for Human Rights (ACHR) and then describes Bull Connor's attempts to intimidate the SCLC. He tells about how the SCLC nevertheless planned the Birmingham campaign, believing that if segregation could be overcome in Birmingham it could have effects across the entire United States.

King describes the alliance between the SCLC and the ACHR, and reproduces the text of a "Commitment Card" used for recruiting. (Volunteers who signed the card pledged to meditate on the life of Jesus, pray daily, observe the interests of the community, and to seek "justice and reconciliation—not victory".) He tells the story of how he was imprisoned in the course of demonstrations and then reproduces his (already and thereafter) famous "Letter from Birmingham Jail".

The city government became increasingly willing to negotiate as demonstrations continued. King describes mass participation by young people, full jails, and international media attention fueled by powerful photographs. Negotiators reached an agreement on Friday, May 10, 1963: the city promised desegregation within 90 days, jobs for Blacks in local industry, release of those jailed during the campaign, and ongoing formal diplomacy between Black and White leaders.

The agreement triggered an assassination attempt on King, orchestrated by the local Ku Klux Klan. The bombing at King's hotel room triggered a civil disturbance in Birmingham which brought in the police forces and then the National Guard.

Thousands of student demonstrators were expelled from school by the Birmingham Board of Education. The decision was challenged by the NAACP and overruled by Judge Elbert P. Tuttle in the Fifth Circuit Court of Appeals.

=== Ongoing revolution ===
King advocates continued action in Birmingham, comparing the campaign to the Battle of Bunker Hill—the beginning of organization in a revolutionary army. He warns against complacency in the wake of the Birmingham demonstrations, suggesting that revolt is only the beginning of revolution.

He calls for multi-racial unity, suggesting that Africans were not the only group oppressed in America: "Our nation was born in genocide when it embraced the doctrine that the original American, the Indian, was an inferior race. Even before there were large numbers of Negroes on our shores, the scar of racial hatred had already disfigured colonial society." He argues that the summer of 1963 has made most Whites in America more receptive to the idea of legal equality for Blacks.

He describes the August 1963 March on Washington for Jobs and Freedom, praising the participation of White churches but frustrated by the neutrality of the AFL–CIO. He notes that millions of Americans watched scenes from the March on television and expresses hope for the future of this medium.

The conclusion provides an explanation of "why we can't wait": that Blacks must no longer move towards freedom, but assert their freedom. King writes: "It is because the Negro knows that no person—as well as no nation—can truly exist half slave and half free that he has embroiders upon his banners the significant word now." He calls for a Bill of Rights for the Disadvantaged, including reparations for unpaid wages. He holds out hope for a coalition with poor Whites and organized labor. He suggests that the civil rights movement may be able to work with President Lyndon Johnson, cautioning that political work is dangerous but necessary. He ends by saying that if the civil rights revolution succeeds it may spread nonviolence worldwide, ending the nuclear arms race and bringing world peace.

== Reception and effect ==
The book was generally well received by the mainstream press. It also afforded the Letter from Birmingham Jail its widest circulation yet.

King traveled to promote the book, while also still involved in the St. Augustine Movement.

Why We Can't Wait was an important part of the effort to make the civil rights struggle known to national and international audiences. Describing Birmingham as "the most segregated city in America" transformed it into a symbol for segregation and inequality at large.

== Legacy ==
Adbusters cited Why We Can't Wait (and the Poor People's Campaign) in September 2011 as an inspiration for Occupy Wall Street.

In October 2011, the Obama administration started using the slogan "We Can't Wait", based on the plan to enact policies despite a resistant Congress.

The book has received much contemporary critical acclaim, and was ranked #78 on Modern Library's list of the 100 best non-fiction books written in English.
