= Earl Stallings =

American minister and activist (1916–2006)

The Reverend Earl Stallings
- Born: March 20, 1916; Durham, North Carolina, U.S.
- Died: February 23, 2006 (aged 89); Lakeland, Florida, U.S.
- Spouse: Ruth Langston McMahan Stallings
- Children: Jim Stallings

Earl Stallings (March 20, 1916 – February 23, 2006) was an American Baptist minister and activist in the Civil Rights Movement. In 1963, Rev. Earl Stallings was one of eight signers of the open letter "A Call For Unity," which precipitated a critical response from Rev. Martin Luther King, Jr. in his "Letter from Birmingham Jail." Despite this, Stallings was the only clergy whom King praised by name in his letter, given that Stallings had opened the doors of his church to black worshipers. This same action angered members of his white congregation. One of the blacks allowed in was the civil rights leader Andrew Young. As a result of his moderate stance, Stallings became a target of both segregationists and integrationists. Tension over the issue so divided the church that it eventually split over the issue in 1970, five years after Stallings' departure. When the church voted not to admit a Black woman and her daughter for membership, a large group walked out in protest and would later go on to form Baptist Church of the Covenant.

== Education ==
Earl Stallings was born March 20, 1916, in Durham, North Carolina. He dropped out of school at 16 to take care of his brothers and sisters by managing a fruit stand in Knoxville, Tennessee after his mother died. Stallings was forced into the workforce by The Great Depression, and returned to high school at age 21, graduating at 23. Upon graduation, he entered Carson-Newman where he majored in history and joined Alpha Phi Omega. He earned a master of theology degree from Southwestern Baptist Theological Seminary in Fort Worth. He was a quarter time student pastor of Buffalo Grove Baptist Church in Jefferson City in 1940. He was then a half time student pastor in 1947–51 at Dumplin Creek Baptist Church in Jefferson City.

== Church life ==
He was a full-time pastor at First Baptist Church, Ocala Florida (1951-1962), and served as president of the Florida Baptist Convention for 1956–1957. He also oversaw the "Baptist Hour" radio program on behalf of the Southern Baptist Radio and Television Commission from 1956 to 1961. He was pastor of First Baptist Church, Birmingham, Alabama (1962–1965), and First Baptist Church, Marietta, Georgia (1965–1977). From 1977 to 1985, he worked under the Southern Baptist Convention's Home Mission Board in Sun City West, Arizona as Director of Christian Ministries in the Arizona Southern Baptist Convention.

== Personal life ==
Stallings died when he was 89 in his retirement home in Lakeland, Florida, on February 23, 2006. He left behind a son and two grandchildren: A son named Jim Stallings; Grandson James Stallings; granddaughter Meredith Beeson Stallings; and several nephews including Carl Bowen and Bryant Stallings. Earl had a wife of 64 years, Ruth Langston McMahan Stallings, who died in April 2001.
