= Milton Grafman =

American rabbi (1907–1995)

- Born: Milton Louis Grafman; April 21, 1907; Washington, D.C.
- Died: May 28, 1995 (aged 88); Birmingham, Alabama
- Resting place: Elmwood Cemetery and Mausoleum
- Education: University of Pittsburgh University of Cincinnati (B.A.); Hebrew Union College
- Known for: One of eight Alabama clergymen who wrote "A Call For Unity" and got involved because he thought that Martin Luther King Jr. unjustly labeled these clergymen as racist.
- Spouse: Ida Weinstein Grafman
- Children: Ruth Grafman Fromstein; Stephen Grafman

Milton Louis Grafman (April 21, 1907 – May 28, 1995) was an American rabbi who led Temple Emanu-El in Birmingham, Alabama, from 1941 until his retirement in 1975 and then served as Rabbi Emeritus from 1975 until his death in 1995. He was one of eight local clergy members who signed a public statement criticizing the Birmingham Campaign, to which Martin Luther King Jr. responded in his Letter from Birmingham Jail.

== Education ==
Born in Washington D.C., Grafman spent his boyhood in Pittsburgh, Pennsylvania, where he studied at the public schools and at the University of Pittsburgh. He entered the University of Cincinnati in 1926 and earned his Bachelor of Arts. From there he went on to Cincinnati's Hebrew Union College where he was ordained as a rabbi in 1933. In 1958 he was awarded an honorary Doctor of Divinity Degree by the Hebrew Union College–Jewish Institute of Religion.

== Work ==
Grafman served as rabbi for the congregation of Temple Adath Israel in Lexington, Kentucky, from 1933 until 1941. On December 7, 1941, he began his 34-year service as rabbi at Temple Emanu-El in Birmingham, Alabama.

== Legacy ==
Grafman was one of the founders of Spastic Aid of Alabama, later United Cerebral Palsy, serving as its first president. He established the Institute for Christian Clergy in Birmingham—an annual gathering that promoted the understanding and cooperation of Jewish and Christian religious leaders. His extensive personal Judaic book collection was presented after his death to Alabama's Birmingham Southern College.

== The Birmingham Campaign and Martin Luther King Jr. ==
In 1963, during Grafman’s tenure as the rabbi of Birmingham’s Temple Emanu El, he joined with a group of other prominent Alabama clergymen to address the then turbulent civil rights movement in Alabama’s largest city. Birmingham at the time was described by Martin Luther King Jr. as perhaps the most segregated city in the United States—a city where racial intolerance and anti-Semitism were rampant with an active Ku Klux Klan, National States' Rights Party, and White Citizens Councils.

On January 18, 1963, four days after Governor George Wallace's 1963 inaugural address (often known as the "Segregation Forever" speech) on the steps of the Alabama Capital in Montgomery, Grafman joined with ten other prominent members of the local clergy in issuing an "Appeal for Law and Order and Common Sense" in which they affirmed basic principles of equality, justice and free speech, but also the need to obey current law.

On April 12, 1963, Grafman joined seven of the signatories to the previous Appeal in issuing a second statement, known as "A Call for Unity". This statement was a response to the preparations for the Birmingham campaign, a strategic movement organized by the Southern Christian Leadership Conference, led by King to bring attention to the unequal treatment of black Americans in Birmingham. Reaffirming the January statement, the Call for Unity expressed the view that the planned demonstrations were "unwise and untimely", and that attempts to correct the very real injustices should be pursued patiently in the courts, by local residents. The call asked the "Negro community" of Birmingham to withdraw support from King's demonstrations.

Responding to the April 12, 1963, Call for Unity, King, incarcerated in the city jail after being arrested for his part in the Birmingham campaign, wrote an open letter on April 16, 1963, known as The "Letter from Birmingham Jail". Addressing the eight authors of the Call for Unity as "My Dear Fellow Clergymen", and acknowledging that they were "men of genuine good will" and that their criticisms were sincere, King attempted to explain why he had come to Birmingham (he had been invited by one of the Southern Christian Leadership Conference's local affiliates, the Alabama Christian Movement for Human Rights; why even outsiders had an obligation to fight the racial discrimination there ("injustice anywhere is a threat to justice everywhere"); and why the campaign had not waited to see what the courts and new city leaders would do ("'Wait' has almost always meant 'Never'" and "justice too long delayed is justice denied"). King also notes that he has been disappointed with "white moderates" ("Shallow understanding from people of good will is more frustrating than absolute misunderstanding from people of ill will").

Grafman believed that he and the other signers of the "Call for Unity" had been unfairly branded as racist by King in his "Letter from Birmingham Jail", but he remained silent about it in public for 15 years. In 1978, speaking out publicly for the first time, he criticized King's response to the authors of "the Call for Unity" at a civil rights conference at the University of Alabama, saying "Now this letter is studied in English courses and sociology courses, and I get at least one letter a semester asking me if I'm still a bigot." Grafman was subject to fairly extensive criticism throughout the rest of his life, including from some within the Jewish community, as a result of his signing of the statement.

== Civil rights record ==
Grafman opposed racial segregation, even though he disagreed with King and other leaders of the civil rights movement over tactics and timing. He was one of the "white moderates" criticized by King in the Birmingham Jail letter, but he had worked for racial harmony in opposition to both racial hatred and anti-Semitism. In his 2001 book Blessed Are The Peacemakers: Martin Luther King Jr., Eight White Religious Leaders, and the "Letter from Birmingham Jail", S. Jonathan Bass cites several examples of Grafman's role in the Civil Rights Movement, including:

1. In 1955, Grafman refused to speak at a religious emphasis week at the University of Mississippi after the Mississippi state legislature revoked an invitation to a minister who had made favorable comments about the NAACP.
2. In 1961, Grafman spoke out publicly in opposition to the City of Birmingham’s decision to close all the public parks, golf courses, and swimming pools rather than integrate them.
3. On September 13, 1963, (two days before the 16th Street Baptist Church bombing) Grafman urged his Temple Emanu-El congregation not to give in to fear in a city suffering from moral apathy: "You cannot yield to terror and violence….If you yield once you yield a second time [and] you yield a third time. And then there is nothing more to yield…you have already been captured."
4. On September 19, 1963, (four days after the 16th Street Baptist Church bombing) Grafman, while saying the Kaddish at Rosh Hashanah services, said: "Let us bow our heads in silence. In memory of Denise McNair, Carole Robertson, Addie Mae Collins, Cynthia Wesley, James Robinson, Virgil Ware wantonly killed, insanely slain, brutally murdered, whose deaths we mourn, whose families we would comfort and the shame of whose murders we would and we must have our city [Birmingham] atone."
5. On September 23, 1963, Grafman and other Birmingham religious leaders met at the White House with President John F. Kennedy to discuss the extremely troubled situation in Birmingham. At this meeting, Grafman asked the president if black FBI agents could be assigned to Birmingham.
6. Following the installation of a new city government, Grafman was appointed to the first biracial committee in Birmingham working to smooth the way for integration in the city.
7. When the First Baptist Church of Birmingham split over whether to integrate, the breakaway group formed the Baptist Church of the Covenant committed to an integrated church for all people. Pending the establishment of their own church facility, Grafman offered his congregation’s synagogue for the newly formed church worship services. This offer was accepted and the church members thereafter held their services at Temple Emanu-El for some time until their own church edifice was constructed.

Richard Arrington, Birmingham’s first black mayor said: "[Grafman] has a high level of credibility among all segments of the community, black as well as whites. He has a long record of working to bring about change and a reputation for being concerned about justice."

Orzell Billingsley, an African American attorney and civil rights activist who was involved in securing King's release from the Birmingham Jail, attended Grafman's funeral in May 1995 and returned to the Grafman home to pay his personal respects to the family.

== Personal life ==
Grafman died of cancer May 28, 1995, in Baptist Montclair Hospital in Birmingham at aged 88. He was survived by his wife of 64 years, Ida Weinstein Grafman, his two children Ruth and Stephen, four grandchildren, and five great-grandchildren, Julia Fromstein, Ellie Fromstein, Mari Fromstein, Ben Katz, and Emily Katz.
