= Paul Hardin Jr. =

Paul Hardin Jr. (November 7, 1903 – June 22, 1996) was a bishop in The Methodist Church in the U.S., elected in 1960.

He was Bishop of the Alabama-West Florida Annual Conference of the Methodist Church in 1963 when he joined seven other white clergymen to write the letter A Call For Unity, making a thinly veiled reference to Martin Luther King Jr.; King replied to this letter with his Letter from Birmingham Jail.

Paul was the son of Paul and Harriet (Wannamaker) Hardin. He attended Wofford College in 1920, where he studied law and then to Candler School of Theology, Emory University in 1924, where he received his divinity degree in 1927. Hardin was ordained Deacon in 1929 and Elder in 1931. He was assigned to pastorates in North Carolina and in 1949 he was appointed to Birmingham, Alabama First Methodist Church. Hardin was elected bishop on July 15, 1960, at the Southeastern Jurisdictional conference. For many years he was the resident bishop of the Columbia (South Carolina) area. From 1961 to 1964 he also had charge of the Alabama-West Florida Conference following the death of Bishop Bachman Gladstone Hodge.

Bishop Hardin was a member of the General Board of Education; of the General Board of Christian Social Concerns; and president of the Council on World Service and Finance. He was a delegate to the General Conference and Jurisdictional Conference of 1960. He was a member of the Lake Junaluska Assembly and a trustee of Emory University. Bishop Hardin was installed as president of the United Methodist Church's Council of Bishops on April 15, 1971, in San Antonio, Texas. Bishop Hardin died in 1996.

== Birth and family ==
Paul Hardin Jr. was born November 7, 1903, in Chester, South Carolina. He was the son of Paul and Harriet Wannamaker Hardin. He married Dorothy (Dot) Elizabeth Reel, who died in 1992. She was later buried at the Garrett-Hillcrest Cemetery/Memorial Gardens. They had three children, a daughter named Betsy Reel Hardin, and two sons, Paul III and Edward.

== Death ==
Paul Hardin Jr. died Saturday June 22, 1996, at the age of 92. His service was held on June 25, 1996, at the First Methodist Church in Waynesville, North Carolina. He was buried in Garrett-Hillcrest Memorial Gardens next to his wife Dorothy.

== Honorary titles ==
- Member of the Western North Carolina Conference for 20 years.
- 1949–1960—minister of the First Church in Birmingham, Alabama.
- Resident bishop of South Carolina (Columbia) in the Southeastern Jurisdictional Conference for 12 years. During that time, he also served as relief bishop to the Alabama-West Florida Conference and was President of the Council of Bishops, 1971–1972.
- Member of the Rotary Club of Emory University for life.
- Former Vice-Chairman of the Board of Trustees of Emory University.

== Accomplishments ==
- Member of the General Board of Education
- Member of the General Board of Christian Social Concerns
- President of the Council on World Service and Finance
- Delegate to the General Conference and Jurisdictional Conference of 1960
- Member of the Lake Junaluska Assembly
- Trustee of Emory University
- One of the signers of the letter to Martin Luther King Jr. when King was in the Birmingham Jail

== See also ==
- List of bishops of the United Methodist Church
