= Morris Newfield =

Hungarian-born American rabbi

Morris Newfield (January 31, 1869 – May 7, 1940) was a Hungarian-born American rabbi from Alabama.

== Life ==
Newfield was born on January 31, 1869, in Homonna, Hungary, the son of Seymon Sabbuttsi Newfield and Lena Klein. His father was a Hebrew scholar from Bonyhád who fought in the Hungarian Revolution of 1848 under Lajos Kossuth.

Newfield began studying in the Jewish Theological Seminary in Budapest in 1884, graduating from there with a B.D. in 1889. He also graduated from the Royal Catholic Grand Gymnasium in Budapest that year and enrolled in the University of Budapest Medical College. He left medical school in 1891 to fulfill a deathbed pledge he made to his father and immigrated to America, where he studied at the University of Cincinnati and Hebrew Union College (HUC). While there, he taught a Talmud course at HUC and was superintendent of the John Street Temple Sunday School. He graduated from the University of Cincinnati with a B.A. in 1895, and in that year he was also ordained a rabbi at HUC.

Newfield's first and only pulpit was Temple Emanu-El in Birmingham, Alabama, serving as rabbi there until his death. He founded the first free kindergarten in Birmingham and the local Federation of Jewish Charities (serving as president of the latter until his death), toured the South in an interfaith forum with a Presbyterian minister and a Catholic priest, and was credited by one source as doing more than anyone else in Alabama to "counteract the virus of the Klan movement." He was a professor of Hebrew and Semitics at Howard College, a board member of the Court of Domestic Relations and Juvenile Delinquency from 1915 to 1932, president of the Alabama Tuberculosis Association, an executive with the local Red Cross from 1918 to 1936, and an active relief worker for the Mississippi valley floods of 1937. He received an honorary D.Lit. degree from the University of Alabama in 1921 and an honorary D.D. degree from Hebrew Union College in 1939.

Newfield was or organizer and director of the Associated Charities and the Citizens Relief Committee. He fought against Prohibition and Sunday blue laws, and despite the resulting conflict with the local Christian clergy he founded a chapter of the National Conference of Christians and Jews with them. He sought to end child labor abuses, which led him to serve as president of the Alabama Sociological College, join the Alabama Child Labor Committee, and establish a juvenile court, the Department of Child Welfare, and the Alabama Children's Aid Society. During World War I, he was a part-time chaplain at Camp McClellan to help prove to the Christian community that Jews were patriotic. After the war, he served as chairman Home Services Committee of the local Civilian Relief Committee and assisted returning veterans. He helped organize the Alabama Jewish Religious School Teachers Association and served as its president for two years. He helped push the Central Conference of American Rabbis (CCAR) to adopt an official position against child labor in 1910. He served as the CCAR secretary, and in 1931 he was elected to a two-year term as its president. He steered a non-Zionist course as its president, but within a few years he became a staunch Zionist in response to the rise of Nazi Germany.

In 1901, Newfield married Leah Ullman, daughter of German immigrant and Confederate soldier Samuel Ullman. Their children were Seymon Ullman, Emma Ullman, Mayer Ullman, Lena Jacobs, Lincoln, and John Aldrich.

Newfield died at home from a long illness on May 7, 1940. Rabbi David Marx of Atlanta, Georgia, Newfield's assistant Rabbi Myron Silverman, Rabbi Julian Morgenstern, and Independent Presbyterian Church pastor Dr. Henry M. Edmonds officiated the crowded funeral service at Temple Emanu-El. He was buried in the Temple Cemetery.

In 1986, Mark Cowett wrote a biography about Newfield called Birmingham's rabbi: Morris Newfield and Alabama, 1895-1940.
