= Age-Herald Building =

Building in Birmingham, Alabama

- U.S. National Register of Historic Places
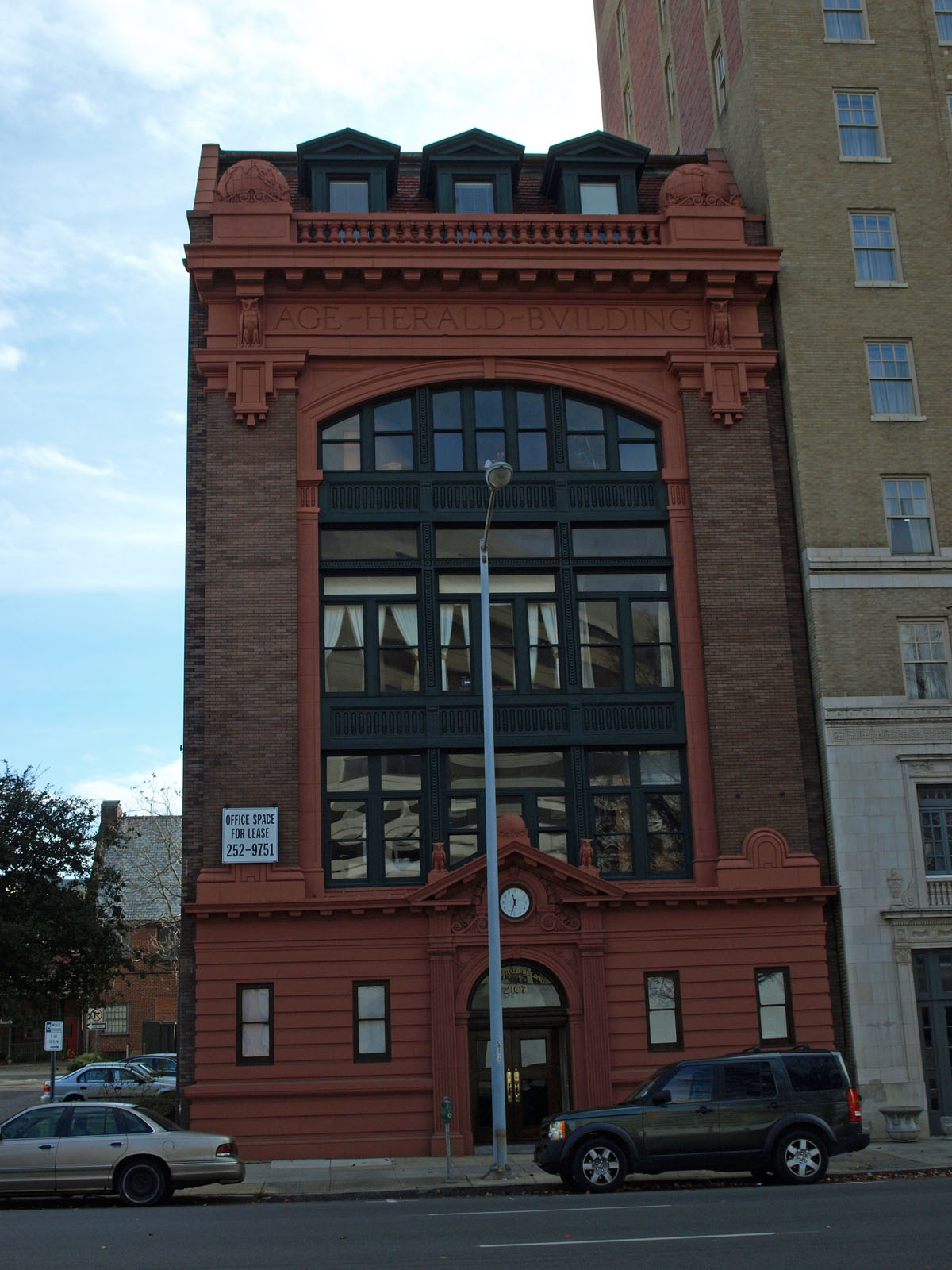

- Location within Alabama Location within the United States
- Location: 2107 5th Ave. N, Birmingham, Alabama
- Coordinates: 33°31′07″N 86°48′22″W
- Area: 0.2 acres (0.081 ha)
- Built: 1910
- Architect: William C. Weston
- Architectural style: Beaux Arts
- NRHP reference No.: 84000620
- Added to NRHP: August 30, 1984

The Age-Herald Building, at 2107 5th Ave. N in Birmingham, Alabama, United States, was built in 1910. It was listed on the National Register of Historic Places in 1984.

It was designed by Birmingham architect William C. Weston and is "one of the best examples of the Beaux Arts style in Birmingham". Also the "building is strongly associated with a major early newspaper in Birmingham—The Age-Herald. It was constructed to house the paper shortly after its creation in 1909 from a merger of The Iron Age and The Elyton Herald, and served as the headquarters of that paper until 1920."
