= A Call for Unity =

1963 open letter and event in the US Civil Rights movement

"A Call for Unity" was an open letter published in The Birmingham [Alabama] News, on April 12, 1963, by eight local white clergymen in response to civil rights demonstrations taking place in the area at the time. In the letter, they took issue with events "directed and led in part by outsiders," and they urged activists to engage in local negotiations and to use the courts if rights were being denied, rather than to protest.

The term "outsider" was a thinly veiled reference to Martin Luther King Jr., who replied four days later, with his famous "Letter from Birmingham Jail." He argued that direct action was necessary to protest unjust laws.

The authors of "A Call for Unity" had written "An Appeal for Law and Order and Common Sense" in January 1963.

== Signatories ==
- C. C. J. Carpenter, D.D., LL.D., Bishop, Episcopal Diocese of Alabama
- Joseph Aloysius Durick, D.D., Auxiliary Bishop, Catholic Diocese of Mobile, Birmingham
- Milton L. Grafman, Rabbi of Temple Emanu-El, Birmingham, Alabama
- Paul Hardin, Bishop of the Alabama-West Florida Conference of the Methodist Church
- Nolan Bailey Harmon, Bishop of the North Alabama Conference of the Methodist Church
- George M. Murray, D.D., LL.D., Bishop Coadjutor, Episcopal Diocese of Alabama
- Edward V. Ramage, Moderator, Synod of the Alabama Presbyterian Church in the United States
- Earl Stallings, Pastor, First Baptist Church, Birmingham, Alabama
