= Heaviest Corner on Earth =

- U.S. National Register of Historic Places
- U.S. Historic district
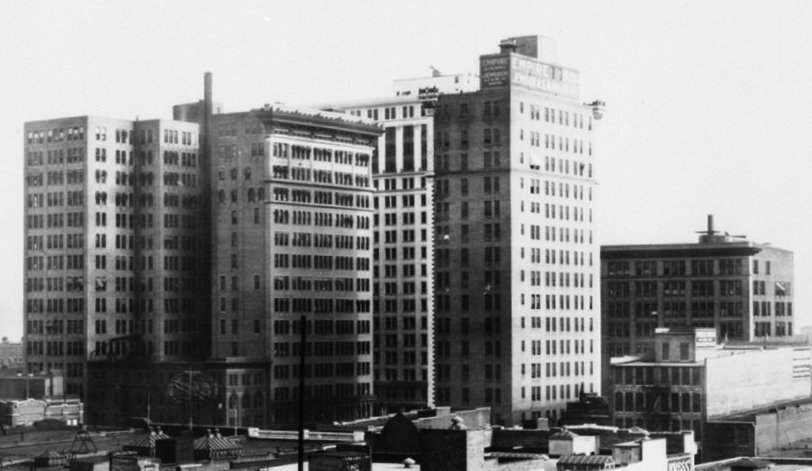

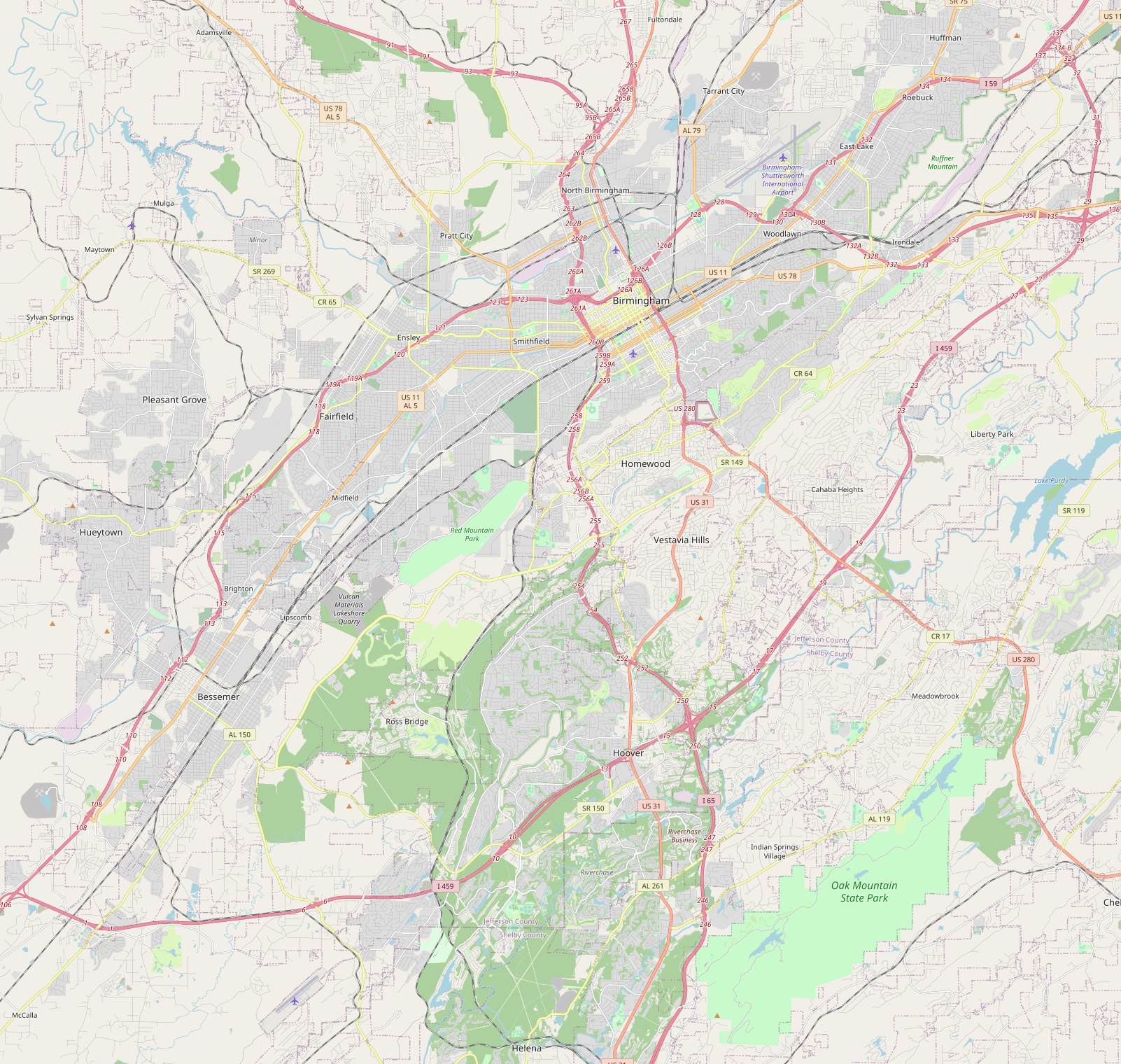
- Location within Birmingham, Alabama Location within Alabama Location within the United States
- Nearest city: Birmingham, Alabama
- Coordinates: 33°30′52″N 86°48′20″W
- Built: 1906
- Architect: William C. Weston
- Architectural style: Chicago, The Commercial Style
- NRHP reference No.: 85001502
- Added to NRHP: July 11, 1985

The Heaviest Corner on Earth is a promotional name given to the corner of 20th Street and 1st Avenue North in Birmingham, Alabama, United States, in the early 20th century. The name reflected the nearly simultaneous appearance of four of the tallest buildings in the South, the 10-story Woodward Building (1902), 16-story Brown Marx Building (1906), 16-story Empire Building (1909), and the 21-story American Trust and Savings Bank Building (1912).

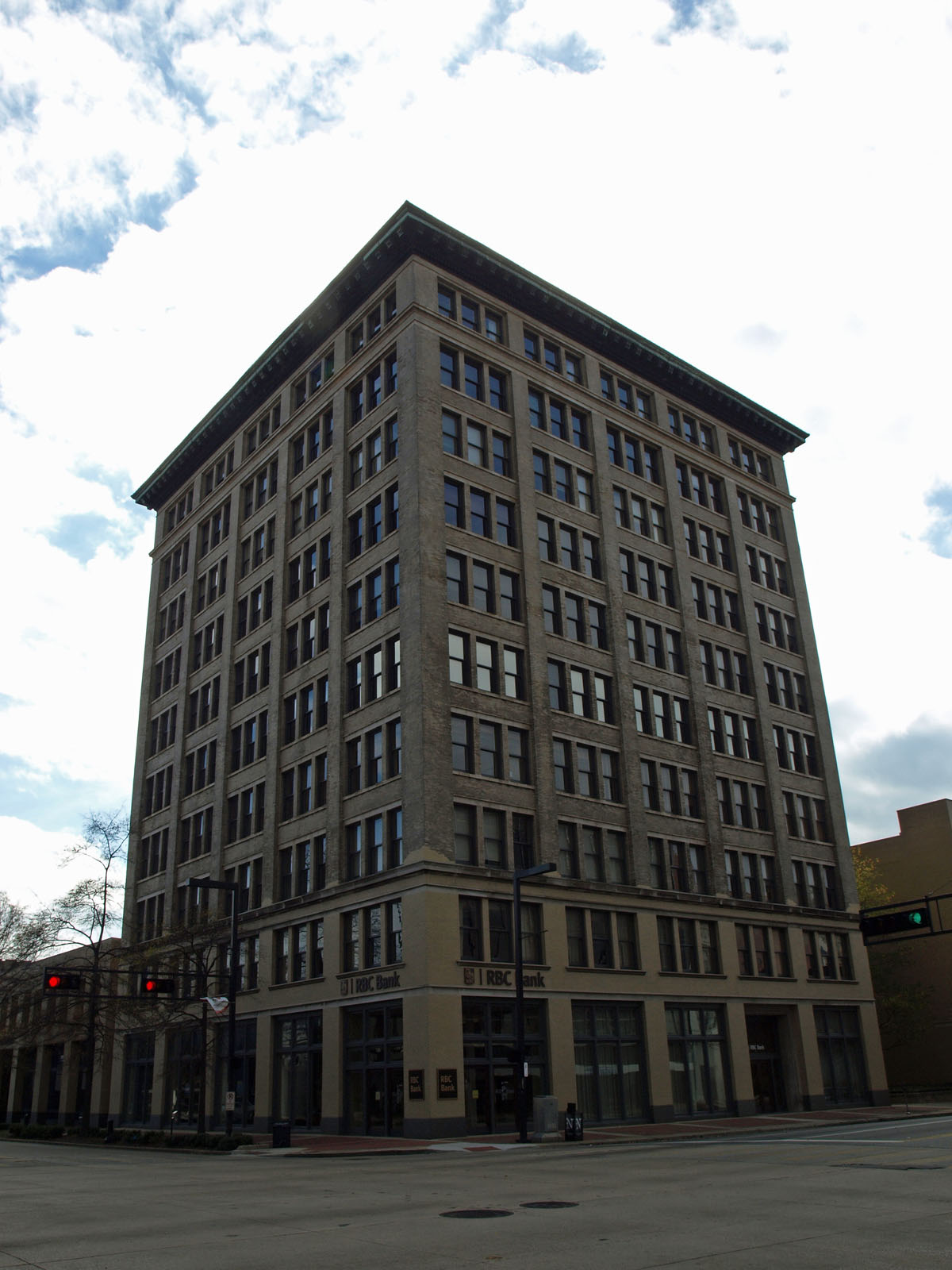
Woodward Building in 2011

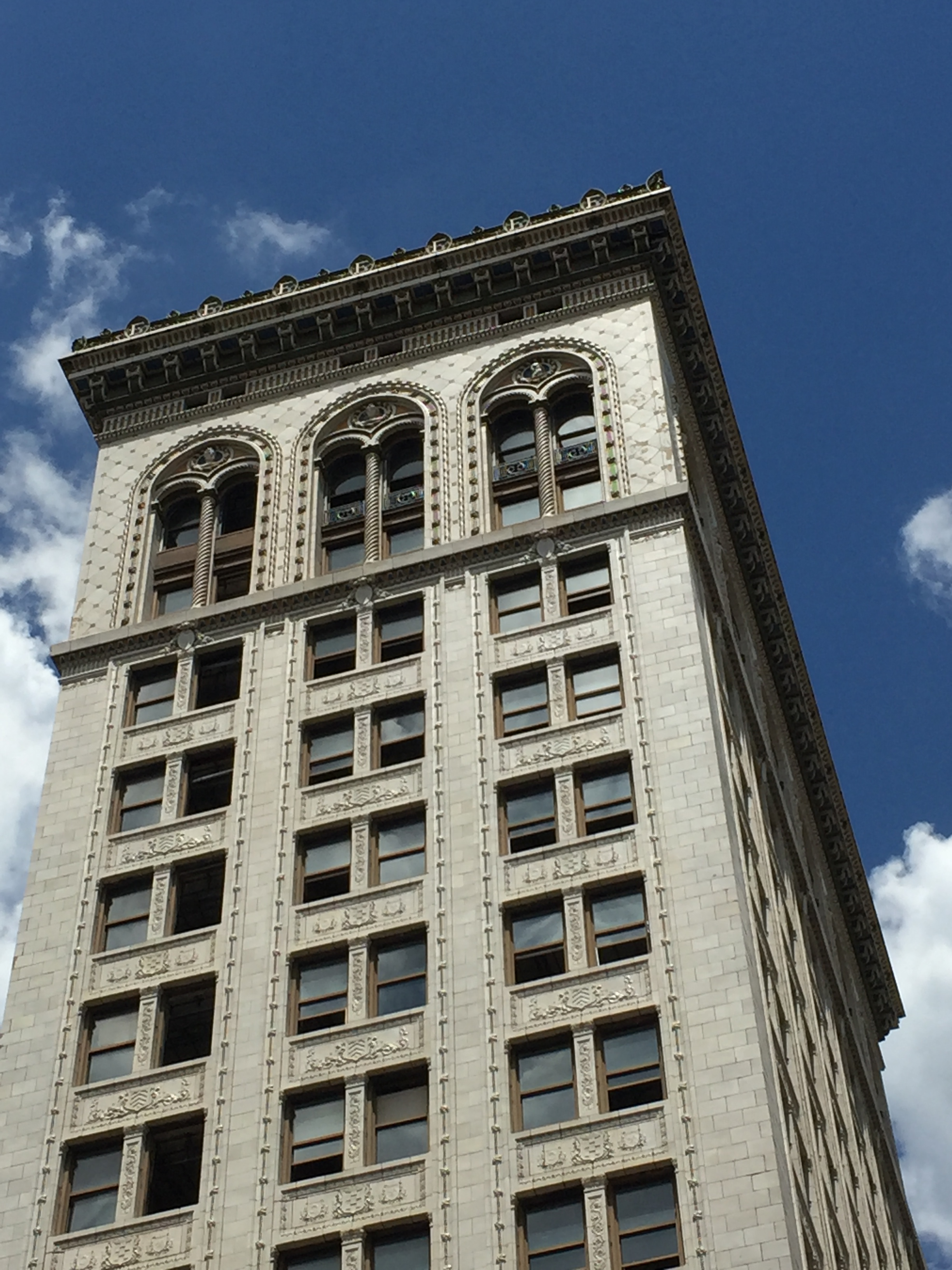
Top of the Empire Building in 2016

The announcement of the last building was made in the Jemison Magazine in a January 1911 article titled "Birmingham to Have the Heaviest Corner in the South". Over the years, that claim was inflated to the improbable "Heaviest Corner on Earth", which remains a popular name for the grouping.

A marker, erected on May 23, 1985 by the Birmingham Historical Society, with cooperation from Operation New Birmingham, stands on the sidewalk outside the Empire Building describing the group. The buildings have been listed on the National Register of Historic Places: three were listed individually in 1982 and 1983, and the group of four was listed as a historic district on July 11, 1985.

== Woodward Building ==
The Woodward Building is listed on the National Register of Historic Places. Built in 1902, the Woodward Building was designed by Stone Brothers Ltd., architects of New Orleans, and William C. Weston.

== See also ==
- National Register of Historic Places listings in Birmingham, Alabama
