= We Can't Wait =

2011–2012 Barack Obama policy initiative

We Can't Wait is a policy initiative launched by the U.S. President Barack Obama's administration in October 2011 to institute policies by executive orders, administrative rulemaking, and recess appointments. The initiative was developed in response to the United States Congress' unwillingness to pass economic legislation proposed by Obama, and conflicts in Congress during the 2011 debt ceiling crisis.

== Executive actions ==
The following is a list of actions conducted by Barack Obama's administration as part of the We Can't Wait program, along with the brief description, and the date issued.

1. Expanded eligibility for the Home Affordable Refinance Program (HARP) (October 24, 2011)—allows any homeowner with a mortgage owned or guaranteed by Fannie Mae or Freddie Mac to refinance their mortgage to obtain a lower monthly payments.
2. Instituted tax credits for employers who hire unemployed or disabled veterans (October 25, 2011)—creates a $5,600 tax credit for firms that hire unemployed veterans, and a $9,600 credit for employers that hire veterans with service-connected disabilities.
3. Instituted policies to reduce student loan payments (October 26, 2011)—has Department of Education issue rules to cap payments on federal student loans at 15% of the borrower's discretionary income, or 10% of the borrower discretionary income for individuals in certain public-sector fields (e.g., social work, teaching). Also allows borrowers to consolidate their education loans, and refinance them at a lower interest rate.
4. Directed Food and Drug Administration (FDA) to take steps to prevent prescription drug shortages (October 31, 2011)—has the FDA issue rules to require pharmaceutical companies to give advanced noticed of any drug shortage, and has FDA and Department of Justice investigation of price gouging during instances of drug shortages.
5. Imposed higher automobile fuel efficiency requirements (November 16, 2011)—has the Environmental Protection Agency (EPA) and the Department of Transportation (DOT) issue rules to have new cars and light trucks operate at an average of 54.5 miles per gallon of gasoline (MPG) by 2025. A previous Obama administration directive requires an average MPG of 35.5 by 2016.
6. Allocated $2 billion to support startup companies (December 8, 2011)—has the Small Business Administration (SBA) give out $1 billion in capital to startup companies, and $1 billion worth of software, consulting, and legal services to startups.
7. Mandated minimum wage and overtime protections for home care workers (December 15, 2011)— has the Department of Labor issue rules that would provide minimum wage and overtime protections for two million workers who provide in-home care services for the elderly and infirmed.
8. Appointed Richard Cordray as the director of the Consumer Financial Protection Bureau (CFPB) (January 4, 2012)—uses recess appointment powers to install Cordray as director of the CFPB until the end of the next congressional term. Based on the Dodd-Frank financial legislation passed in 2010, the director is needed for the CFPB to regulate non-bank financial institutions (e.g., payday lenders, mortgage brokers), and for the CFPB to engage in rulemaking.
9. Appointed three members to the National Labor Relations Board (NLRB) (January 4, 2012)—uses recess appointment powers to install Democratic union lawyer Richard Griffin, Democratic Labor Department official Sharon Block, and Republican NLRB lawyer Terence Flynn to the 5-member NLRB.
10. Initiated program to help youths find summer jobs (January 5, 2012)—has the Department of Labor allocate $1.5 billion to help create 250,000 paid and unpaid summer jobs, and year-round employment for low-income youths.
11. President Obama has expedited seven solar and wind energy projects (August 7, 2012) in Arizona, California, Nevada, and Wyoming. Together, these infrastructure projects will produce nearly 5,000 MW of clean energy, according to the White House. The five solar projects include the following installations:
  - Quartzsite Solar Energy, a 100 MW concentrating solar power (CSP) plant under development in Arizona by Solar Reserve.
  - Desert Harvest Solar Energy, a 150 MW PV plant under development by enXco in California.
  - McCoy Solar Energy, a 750 MW PV plant under development by NextEra in California.
  - Moapa Solar Energy Center, a multiple-technology solar plant under development by RES Americas and the Moapa Band of Paiute Indians in Nevada. The 200 MW project would employ 100 MW of PV technology and 100 MW of CSP technology.
  - Silver State South, a 350 MW PV plant under development in Nevada by First Solar.
  - Chokecherry/Sierra Madre Wind Energy (Power Company of WY), a 3,000 MW Wind Farm in Carbon County, Wyoming.

== Criticism ==
Some Republicans have criticized the We Can't Wait campaign as a threat to Congress's oversight authority. John Boehner, the then House Speaker, stated that Obama's executive orders will be reviewed to ensure that they do not conflict with the Constitution or federal law.
