= The Park Shelton =

- The Wardell
- U.S. National Register of Historic Places
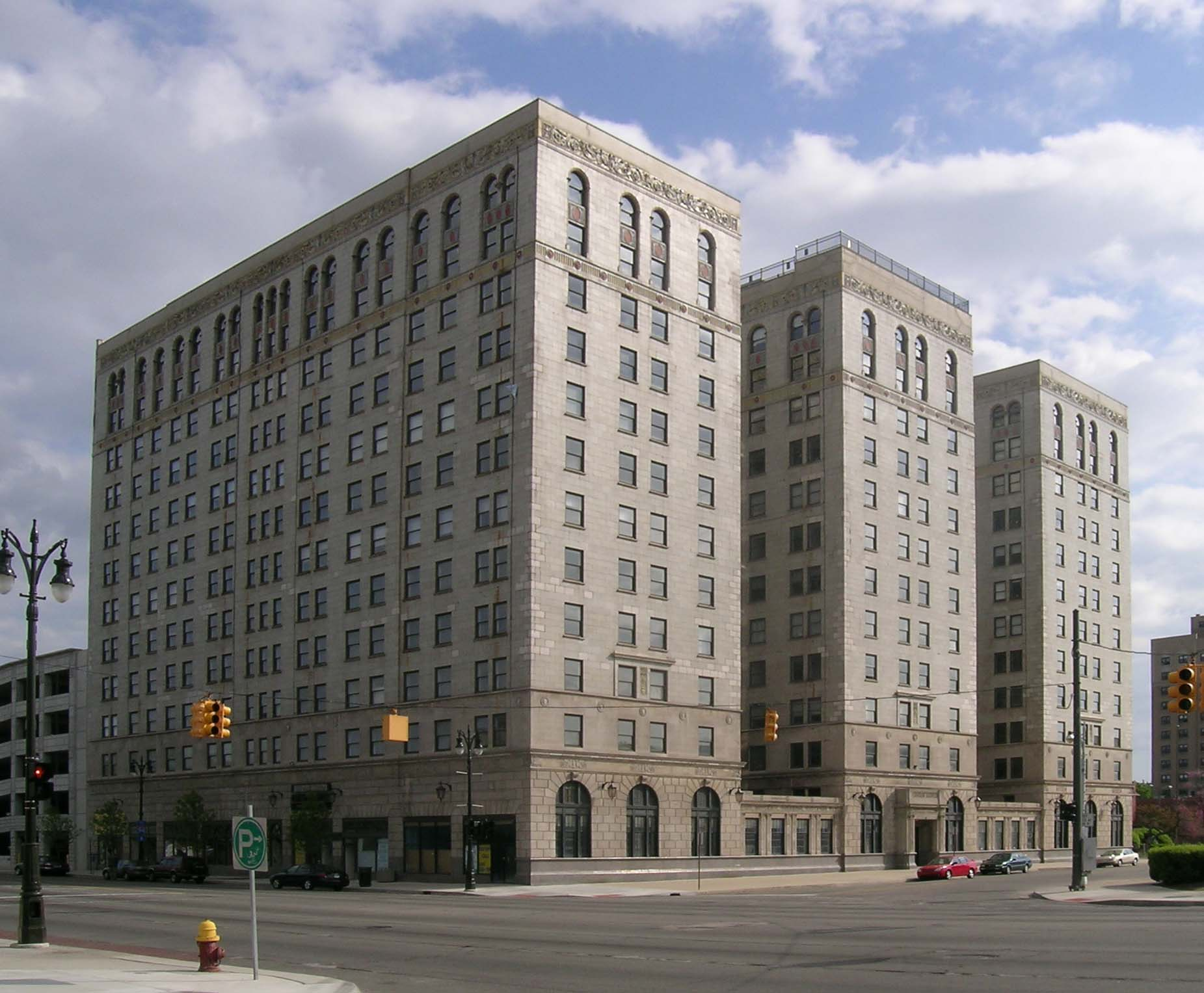
- The Park Shelton, seen from across Woodward
- Interactive map
- Location: 15 East Kirby Street; Detroit, Michigan, United States
- Coordinates: 42°21′38″N 83°3′58″W
- Built: 1926
- Architect: Weston and Ellington
- Architectural style: Late 19th and 20th Century Revivals
- NRHP reference No.: 07000744
- Added to NRHP: August 22, 2007

The Park Shelton is a historic condominium building located at 15 East Kirby Street (on the corner of Kirby and Woodward Avenue) in Midtown Detroit, Michigan. Built in 1926 as The Wardell hotel, the building was therefore listed under this name in the National Register of Historic Places in 2007.

== History ==
The Wardell was designed by Detroit architects Weston and Ellington and built by Bryant and Detwiler in 1926 as a residential hotel, intended for extended stays. Architectural sculpture for the building was created by Corrado Parducci. The name comes from Fred Wardell, who owned the Eureka Vacuum Cleaner Company. Diego Rivera and his wife (and fellow artist), Frida Kahlo, lived there while working on his mural at the Detroit Institute of Arts.

The Wardell was sold to Sheraton Hotels in October 1941, and renamed The Wardell Sheraton Hotel in 1943, then the Sheraton Hotel, and finally the Park Sheraton Hotel in December 1951. In September 1952, it was sold to New Yorker Louis Schleiffer. As he could no longer use the Sheraton name, he changed the spelling just slightly, renaming it the Park Shelton Hotel. It was the Detroit hotel of choice for such celebrities as Bob Hope, George Burns, Gracie Allen, and Raymond Burr. In the 1970s, the Park Shelton Hotel was converted to apartments.

In 2004, the Park Shelton was redeveloped into condominiums, creating 227 luxury units in the building. The newly refurbished building was opened in August 2004.
