= Metropolitan Building (Detroit) =

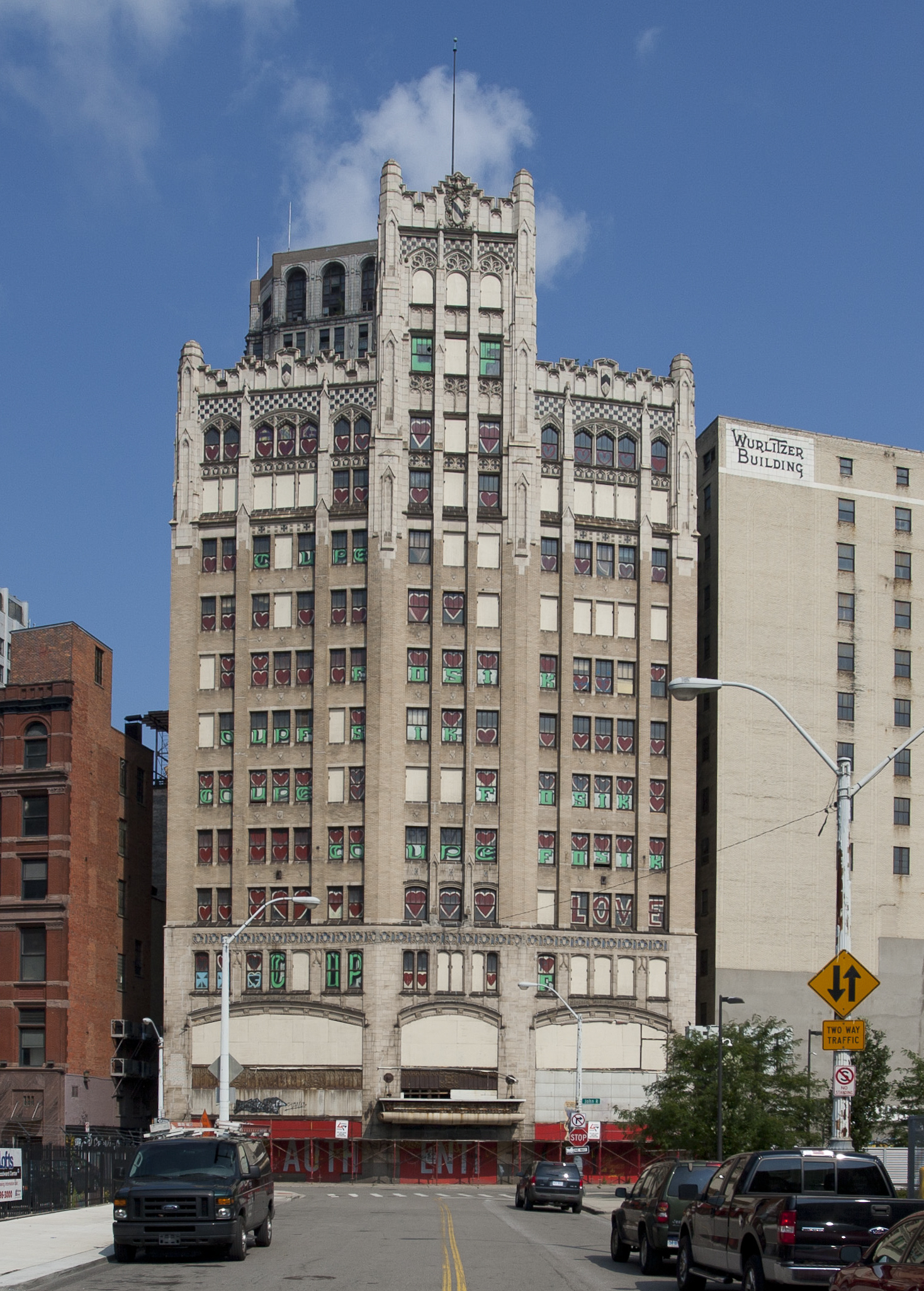
- Interactive map of the Metropolitan Building area

General information
- Type: hotel
- Architectural style: Gothic Revival
- Location: 33 John R Street; Detroit, Michigan; United States
- Coordinates: 42°20′7.37″N 83°2′55.87″W
- Construction started: 1924
- Completed: 1925
- Renovated: 2018

Height
- Antenna spire: 182 ft 10 in (55.7 m)
- Roof: 173 ft 8 in (52.9 m)

Technical details
- Floor count: 15

Design and construction
- Architect: Weston and Ellington

Other information
- Public transit: Broadway

The Element Detroit at the Metropolitan is a high-rise hotel, formerly the Metropolitan Building, a historic office building located on a triangular lot at 33 John R Street in downtown Detroit, Michigan, near Grand Circus Park.

The building was built in 1924 and finished in 1925. It stands at 15 stories and was once occupied by shops, offices, and the facilities of jewelry manufacturers and wholesalers leading it to also be known as the "Jeweler's Building". The manufacture of luminous watch dials in the building left behind several toxic substances that have thwarted redevelopment plans. Architects Weston and Ellington designed it in a Neo-Gothic style. The exterior of the building is faced with brick, granite, and terra cotta. The building closed in 1977.

In March 2010, the Downtown Development Authority voted to install safety scaffolding and netting on the building to prevent parts of the facade from falling.

In September 2013, the city requested bids for removal of asbestos and other hazardous materials from the building to determine if it should be demolished or restored. The property was offered to Rock Ventures, owned by developer Dan Gilbert, however the company declined to take ownership of the structure. Earlier, Bruce Schwartz of Bedrock Real Estate Services, one of Rock Ventures subsidiaries, said that part of the building could be demolished to construct a public space, lofts and offices. However, he later said the company would be open to restoring the structure.

In March 2015, the Downtown Development Authority approved a $23.2 million renovation plan to create 71 apartments along with commercial and retail space on the bottom two floors.

In May 2016, it was announced that the building would be converted to a hotel, Element Detroit at the Metropolitan. The 100,000 square-foot building opened in December 2018 as a 110-room extended-stay hotel, with 2,000 square feet of meeting space on the second-floor, 7,000 square feet of retail on the ground floor and lower level, and a roof patio on the 11th floor.
