= Weston and Ellington =

Detroit based architectural firm

Weston and Ellington were a prolific Detroit based architectural firm operating in the 1910s and 1920s. They designed numerous apartment buildings, offices, auto sales buildings and other commercial structures, mostly in and around the city of Detroit.

Weston & Ellington were one of the many firms that employed Detroit architectural sculptor Corrado Parducci.

== Selected commissions ==
All commissions are located in Detroit, Michigan, unless otherwise stated.

- Delta Tau Delta Fraternity House, Ann Arbor, Michigan – 1924
- Metropolitan Building – 1925
- Hotel Fort Wayne – 1926
- The Wardell (listed on the National Register of Historic Places) – 1926
- The Price [Macomb Daily] Building, Mount Clemens, Michigan – 1928
- New Light Baptist Church (formerly Nardin Park Methodist Church) – 1929
- Cadillac Casket Company Building
- St. Peter's Parish House

== Sources and references ==
- The Recent Work of Weston & Ellington: Architects & Engineers, Detroit Michigan, 1928
