= Temple Emanu-El (Birmingham, Alabama) =

Reform synagogue in Birmingham, Alabama, US

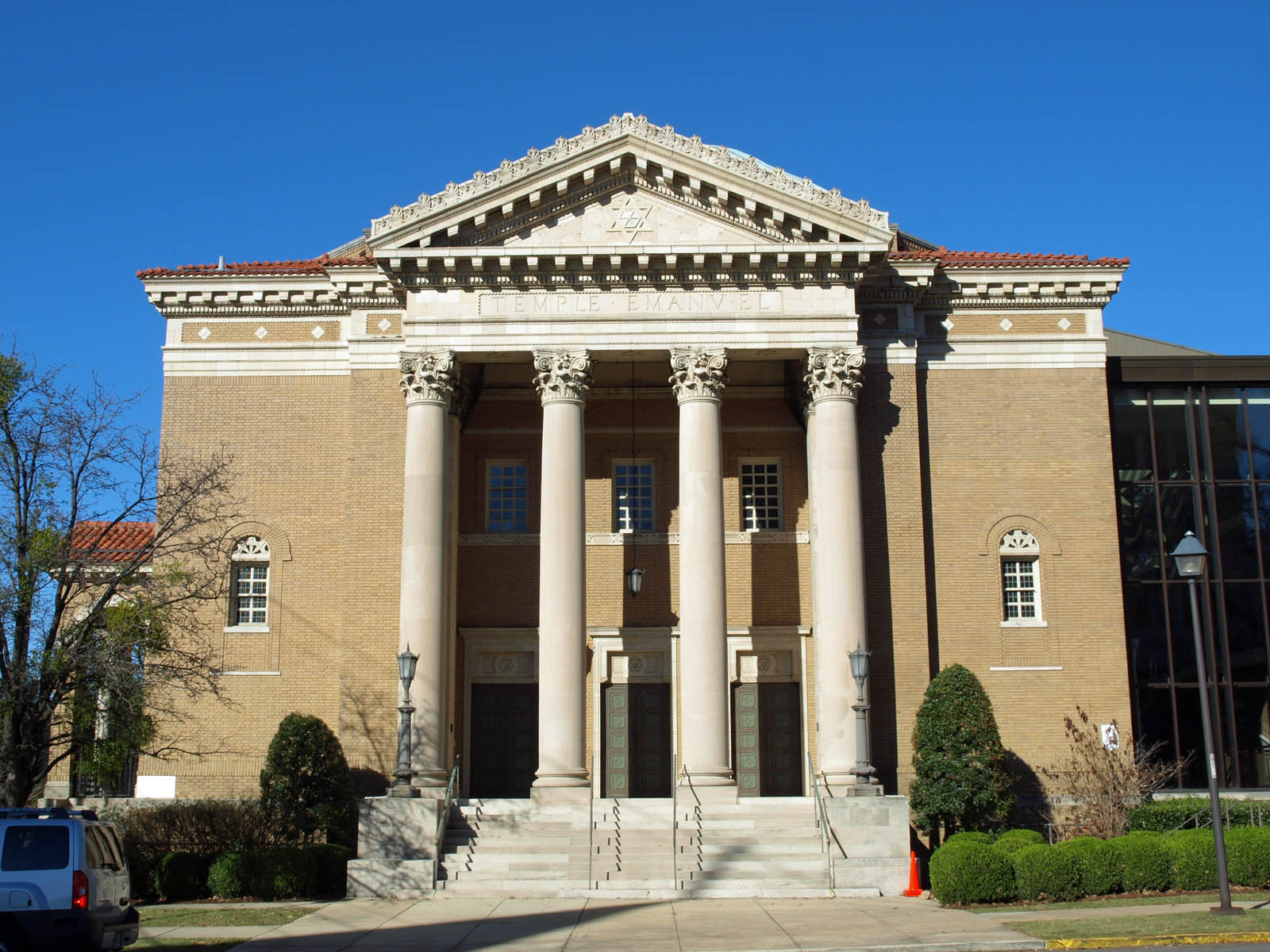
- The synagogue building, in 2012

- Location in Alabama

Religion
- Affiliation: Reform Judaism
- Ecclesiastical or organizational status: Synagogue
- Leadership: Rabbi Adam Wright; Rabbi Jonathan Miller (Emeritus)
- Status: Active

Location
- Location: 2100 Highland Avenue South, Birmingham, Alabama 35205
- Country: United States
- Interactive map of Temple Emanu-El
- Coordinates: 33°30′01″N 86°47′38″W

Architecture
- Architect: William C. Weston (1912)
- Type: Synagogue architecture
- Style: Neoclassical (1912)
- Established: 1881 (as a congregation)
- Completed: 1889 (5th Avenue North); 1912 (Highland Ave. South)

Website
- ourtemple.org

Temple Emanu-El (transliterated from the Hebrew for "God is with us"), is a Reform Jewish congregation and synagogue, located at 2100 Highland Avenue South, in Birmingham, Alabama, in the United States.

== History ==
The community that would become Temple Emanu-El first held Rosh Hashana and Yom Kippur celebrations in 1881. The temple's founding president and lay leader was Samuel Ullman, a businessman, poet, and humanitarian.

Before its first synagogue was built, the community met at the Cumberland Presbyterian Church on 5th Avenue North for the public worship services. Land for the synagogue was purchased in 1884, and construction began in 1886. The building, located on the southeast corner of 5th Avenue North and 17th Street, was inaugurated on January 24, 1889. The building was a mix of Romanesque, Gothic, and Moorish revival elements, with a corner tower and at least three turrets, all with bulbous cupolas.

In 1912, the congregation moved to a new sanctuary at 2100 Highland Avenue South, designed by William C. Weston in the Neoclassical style. An extensive renovation and expansion of the building occurred in 2004, costing $17 million. The sanctuary was updated and restored, and other buildings for congregational and community functions were rebuilt.

As of December 2025, it had 623 member families.

== Rabbinical leaders ==
Rabbi Morris Newfield, originally from Hungary, led the congregation for 45 years, from 1895 to 1940. Rabbi Milton Grafman, one of the signers of "A Call for Unity", led the congregation from 1941 to 1975. Rabbi Jonathan Miller served the congregation from winter 1991 to summer 2017. Rabbi Adam Wright has served the congregation since July 2019. He will at the end of June 2026 to become rabbi at Congregation B’nai Jehoshua Beth Elohim in the Chicago suburb of Deerfield, Illinois.

== See also ==
- List of synagogues in the United States
