= James T. Stephens =

American businessman and philanthropist

- Born: April 14, 1939 (age 87); Birmingham, Alabama, US
- Education: Yale University; Harvard University (MBA)
- Occupation: Businessman
- Known for: Chairman of EBSCO Industries
- Spouse: Julie Stephens
- Children: 4
- Parent: Elton Bryson Stephens, Sr.

James T. Stephens (born April 14, 1939) is an American businessman and philanthropist from Alabama.

== Early life ==
James T. Stephens was born on April 14, 1939, in Birmingham, Alabama. His father, Elton Bryson Stephens, Sr., founded EBSCO Industries in 1944. His mother was the former Alys Robinson.

He graduated from Yale University, where he earned a bachelor's degree in history in 1961. He earned an MBA from the Harvard Business School in 1964.

== Career ==
Stephens served as a lieutenant in the United States Army. He joined the family business, EBSCO Industries, where he served as president from 1970 to 2005. He served as its chairman from 2002 to 2017.

He was inducted into the Alabama Business Hall of Fame in 2008 and the Alabama Academy of Honor in 2012.

== Philanthropy ==
Stephens previously served as the chairman of the boards of trustees of the Highlands School in Mountain Brook, Alabama, the Altamont School, and Birmingham–Southern College. Additionally, he served as the chairman of the Greater Alabama Council of the Boy Scouts of America.

He donated US$2 million to the United Way of Central Alabama. He has endowed scholarships at Jefferson State Community College, Troy University, and Birmingham-Southern College. He has also made charitable contributions to the God's Outreach Center in Harpersville, Alabama as well as UNICEF and Doctors Without Borders.

With his father, Stephens donated US$2.5 million to the University of Alabama at Birmingham. They also donated US$15 million for the construction of the Elton B. Stephens Science Center on the campus of Birmingham–Southern College.

== Personal life ==
He is married to Julie Stephens. They have four children.
