= EBSCO =

EBSCO can refer to:

- EBSCO Industries
- EBSCO Information Services
