= Military Service Company =

Manufacturer of challenge coins

Military Service Company, the oldest division of EBSCO Industries Inc, was founded during World War II and provides an array of goods and services that serve the U.S. military. The Birmingham, AL-based company's popular military commemoratives inventory includes challenge coins for the Army, Navy, Air Force, Marines, Coast Guard, Veterans, National Guard as well as military-themed license plate holders, pens and more.

== Recent events ==
In July 2009, Military Service Company's challenge coin business was purchased by Northwest Territorial Mint.

== See also ==
- Medallic art
