= Flag of Birmingham, Alabama =

City of Birmingham
- Proportion: 10:19
- Adopted: August 18, 1925
- Design: A vertical triband of red (hoist-side and fly-side) and white, with a design (Note: The defacement on the white band is a large red five-pointed star, in whose center is the Seal of the City of Birmingham in black on top of a gold seven-toothed gear (cogwheel), encircled by 67 small gold stars. The circle of small stars is itself surrounded by 67 short lines, alternating between two lengths, pointing outwards from the center to form another circle.) featuring a prominent red star centered on the white band. The three bands are in the proportions 4:7:4.
- Designed by: Idyl King Sorsby

The city flag of Birmingham was designed by Idyl King Sorsby for the occasion of the semicentennial of the city of Birmingham in 1921. The flag was officially adopted as the city's flag on August 18, 1925.

== Design ==
The flag consists of a vertical triband of red-white-red stripes in proportion 4:7:4. In the center of the flag is a red star, surrounded by a ring of 67 tiny golden stars. Radiating out of these stars are 85 golden rays, forming another circle. Within the large red star is the official seal of the city of Birmingham in gold and black. Surrounding the seal are seven golden notches.

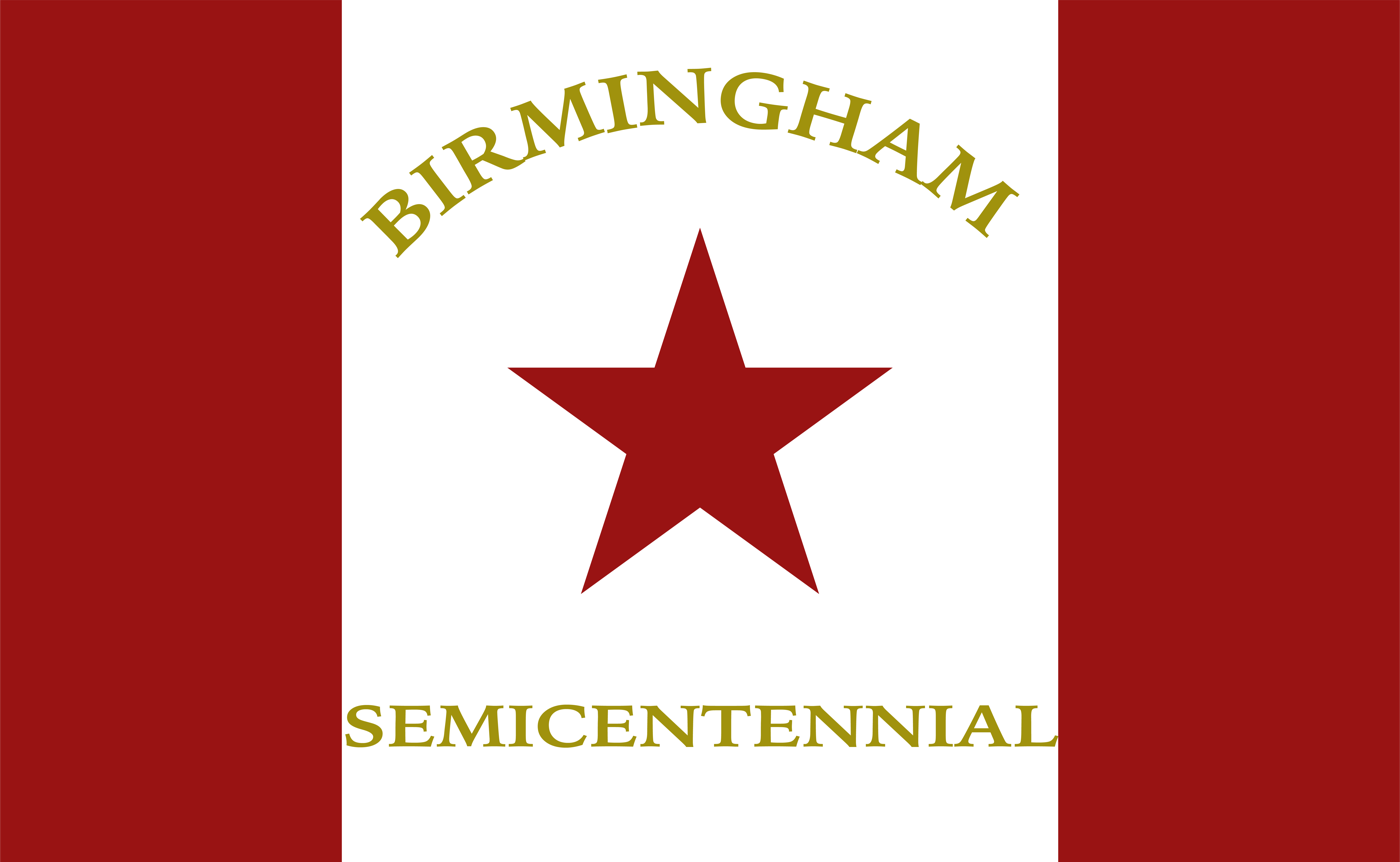
Flag used to celebrated the city's 50th anniversary, 1921

== Symbolism ==
The seal of the city includes a depiction of Vulcan, the Roman god of smiths and metalworkers. By the late 19th and early 20th centuries, Birmingham was the center of industry and ironworking in the southern states of the US.

The designer of the flag provided a number of explanations for the colours used in the flag:

- White: reflected the purity of the women of the city.
- Red: symbolic of the valour of the men of Birmingham.
- Gold: points towards the mineral wealth of the city as well as the high standard of its citizens.

The large red star was included to represent the city, whilst the golden notches reflect Birmingham being a 'hub' of commerce and industry in the region.

The 67 golden stars were included to represent the 67 counties of Alabama, whereas the 85 golden rays suggest that 'All roads lead to Birmingham'; a play on the proverb 'All roads lead to Rome.'

== NAVA survey ==
In 2004, the North American Vexillological Association conducted a survey of 450 members and visitors to its website to identify the best- and worst-designed city flags in the United States. Birmingham's flag ranked 39th out of 150 with a mean rating of 4.97 on a scale of 0 to 10.
