= Elton Bryson Stephens Sr. =

American businessman (1911–2005)

- Born: August 4, 1911; Clio, Alabama, US
- Died: February 5, 2005 (aged 93)
- Occupation: Business executive
- Known for: Founder of EBSCO Industries
- Spouse: Alys Robinson
- Children: 4, including James T. Stephens

Elton Bryson Stephens Sr. (1911–2005) was an American businessman from Alabama, who founded EBSCO Industries.

== Early life ==
Stephens was born on August 4, 1911, in Clio, Alabama. Stephens graduated from Birmingham–Southern College in 1932.

== Career ==
Stephens founded Military Service Co. in 1944, with US$5,000 ($91,446 in 2025). The company sold magazine subscriptions to the United States Army. It later became known as EBSCO Industries, a diversified company in "information services, publishing and digital media, outdoor products, real estate, manufacturing, and general services."

== Philanthropy ==
Stephens established the Metropolitan Arts Council of Birmingham in 1986. He donated $15 million to the Alabama Symphony Orchestra, where he was chairman of its board of trustees, and where the Alys Robinson Stephens Performing Arts Center was named after his late wife. Additionally, he donated $1 million to the United Way of Central Alabama in 1997, joining their Million Dollar Roundtable. For charitable contributions to the Birmingham Museum of Art, the Stephens Family Gallery is named in his family's honor. The Red Mountain Expressway was renamed the Elton B. Stephens Expressway by the City of Birmingham on September 11, 1975.

With his son James, Stephens donated $2.5 million to the University of Alabama at Birmingham. They also paid $15 million for the construction of the Elton B. Stephens Science Center on the campus of Birmingham–Southern College.

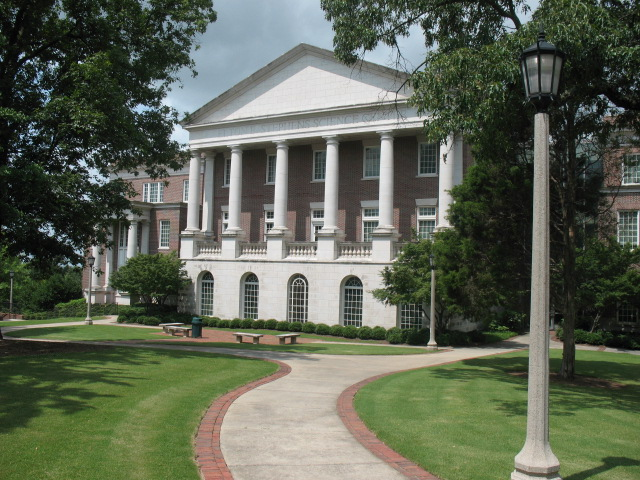
The Elton B. Stephens Science Center on the campus of Birmingham–Southern College

== Personal life ==
Stephens was married to Alys Robinson. They met as students at Birmingham–Southern College and graduated together in 1932. They had two sons, including James T. Stephens, and two daughters. His wife died in 1996.

== Death and legacy ==
Stephens died on February 5, 2005. His son James serves as the chairman of EBSCO Industries.
