= Red Diamond =

American beverage company

Red Diamond Coffee and Tea
- Company type: Private
- Industry: Food processing
- Founded: 1906; 120 years ago
- Website: reddiamond.com

Red Diamond Inc. is an American beverage company that manufactures coffee and tea products for both retail and foodservice markets across the United States. Red Diamond, founded in 1906, is second oldest coffee and tea company in the United States continuously owned and operated by members of the same family. It is headquartered in Birmingham, Alabama.

The business began in 1906 when William Fitz Donovan founded Donovan Provision Company, located at 2130 Morris Avenue in downtown Birmingham. In the early years, Donovan's horse-drawn wagons supplied eggs, meat and other products to the young steel town. Soon after, Donovan began roasting coffee and decided to name the brand “Red Diamond” after the highest quality gem in existence. The coffee became so successful, he soon abandoned the sales of provisions and concentrated solely on coffee.

In the 1920s, William St. Clair Donovan created the Red Diamond tea blend that remains the basis for the company's premium tea products today. Donovan Provision Company changed its name to Donovan Coffee Company in the 1930s as the sales efforts were dedicated entirely to coffees and teas.

William A. Bowron became the third generation of family to work at the company in 1956 as the company moved its headquarters to 1701 Vanderbilt Road. Under the leadership of Bowron, Red Diamond started a foodservice division to supply food and beverages to restaurants, hotels, schools and healthcare facilities.

Current President and CEO William A. Bowron Jr., joined the company in 1991 after 16 years in the banking industry in Savannah, GA. During his tenure the company officially changed its name to Red Diamond, Inc. and has expanded to include several new divisions and products including Red Diamond's premium ready-to-drink iced tea. In the early 2000s Red Diamond would become the nation's #1 provider of premium fresh-brewed, ready-to-drink tea in the refrigerated case. Red Diamond Tea is currently distributed by Prairie Farms (Prairie Farms, Hiland Dairy).

Red Diamond constructed a new location in Moody, Alabama and occupied the new buildings in January, 2009. In June, 2007, the St. Clair County Commission approved a $1.5 million loan to prepare the site for construction. The move to St. Clair came after 100 years in Birmingham. The expansion plans would increase employment from 160 to 200 people according to company officials. The 85-acre campus includes a seven-acre lake, corporate headquarters, production facility complete with state-of-the-art Scolari coffee and tea production lines, and a distribution warehouse.

In June 2017, Gordon Food Service acquired Red Diamond Foodservice, a division of Red Diamond, Inc. that sold dry grocery, refrigerated, and frozen food products to regional operators. The move allowed Red Diamond to concentrate on the continuing expansion of their coffee and tea business across North America and the Caribbean.

In 2021, Red Diamond celebrated its 115th anniversary. The fifth generation of family, William A. Bowron III and Emily Wood Bowron, are now working at the company as the Vice President of Wholesale Distribution and Vice President of Strategic Marketing.
