= Southern Heritage Festival =

Southern Heritage Festival was a two-day music, arts, and culture festival dedicated to the African American population of Birmingham, Alabama. It was held from 2004 to 2006. The festival took place on the site of the future Railroad Reservation Park along Birmingham's "Railroad Reservation" corridor on the first weekend of August. Music styles include hip hop, Old school hip hop, classic R&B, and Gospel.

== History ==
The Southern Heritage Festival originally began in the 1960s, but ceased to exist by the early 1990s. It was replaced by the now-defunct Birmingham Heritage Festival, which was basically an all-music festival that targeted mostly younger audiences. But in July 2004 the Southern Heritage Festival was revived and given a second chance, with a new name, The Original Southern Heritage Festival, by John Ray, the festival's original organizer.

In 2004 the event was held at the Alabama State Fairgrounds (33.4968°N 86.8714°W), but attendance was disappointing. In 2005 the event was moved to Kelly Ingram Park (33.5163°N 86.8134°W) in Birmingham's Civil Rights District. The 2006 festival was planned for the Railroad Reservation site used successfully by the Schaeffer Eye Center Crawfish Boil. 2006 performers included Patti LaBelle, Buddy Guy, Koko Taylor, Bobby "Blue" Bland, Clarence Carter, and the Little Memphis Blues Orchestra.
