= Birmingham, Alabama =

City in the United States

Birmingham
- City
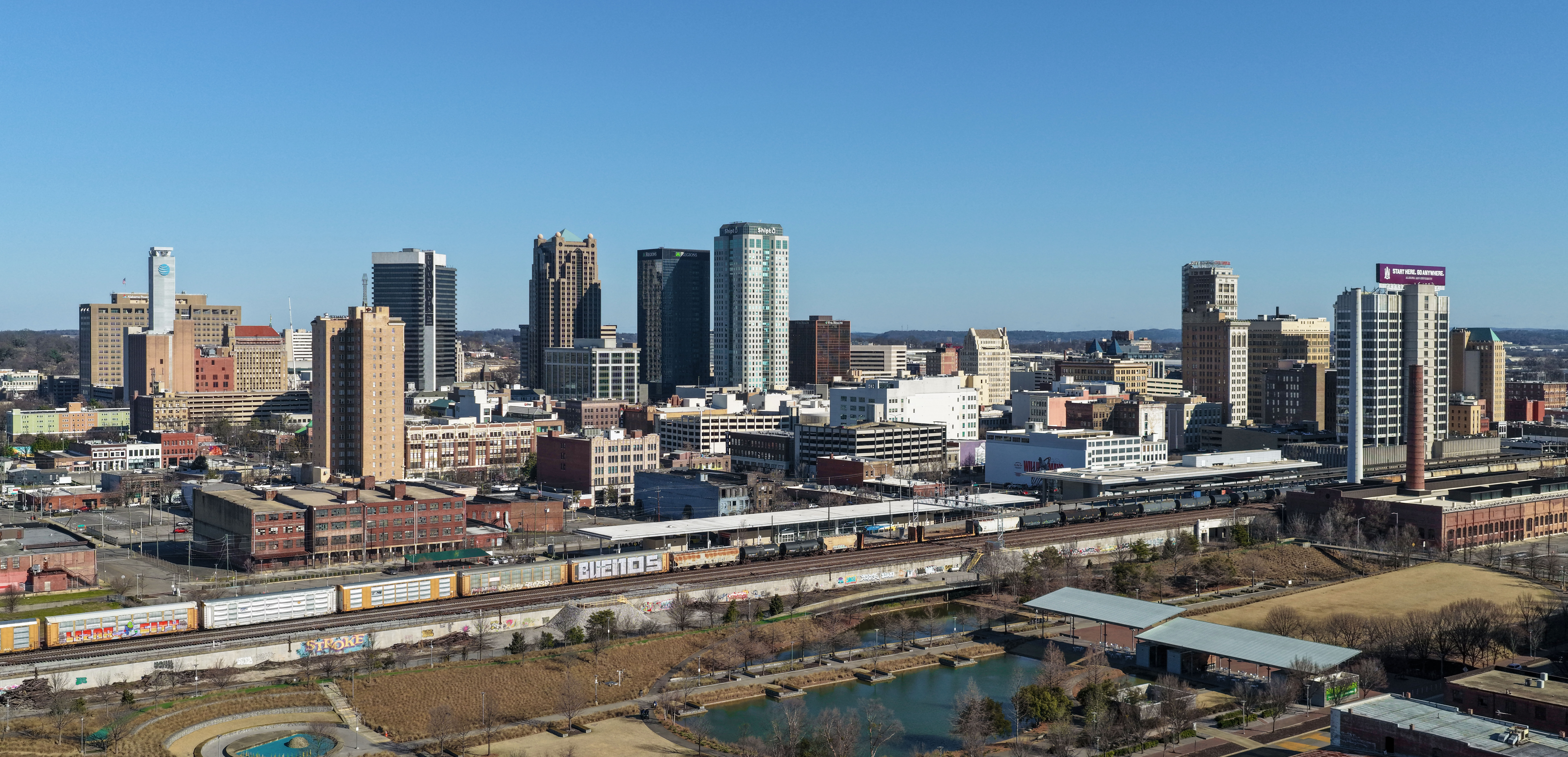
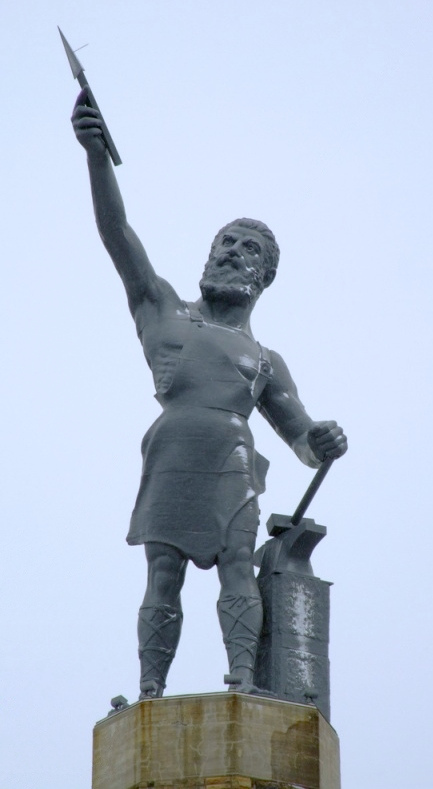
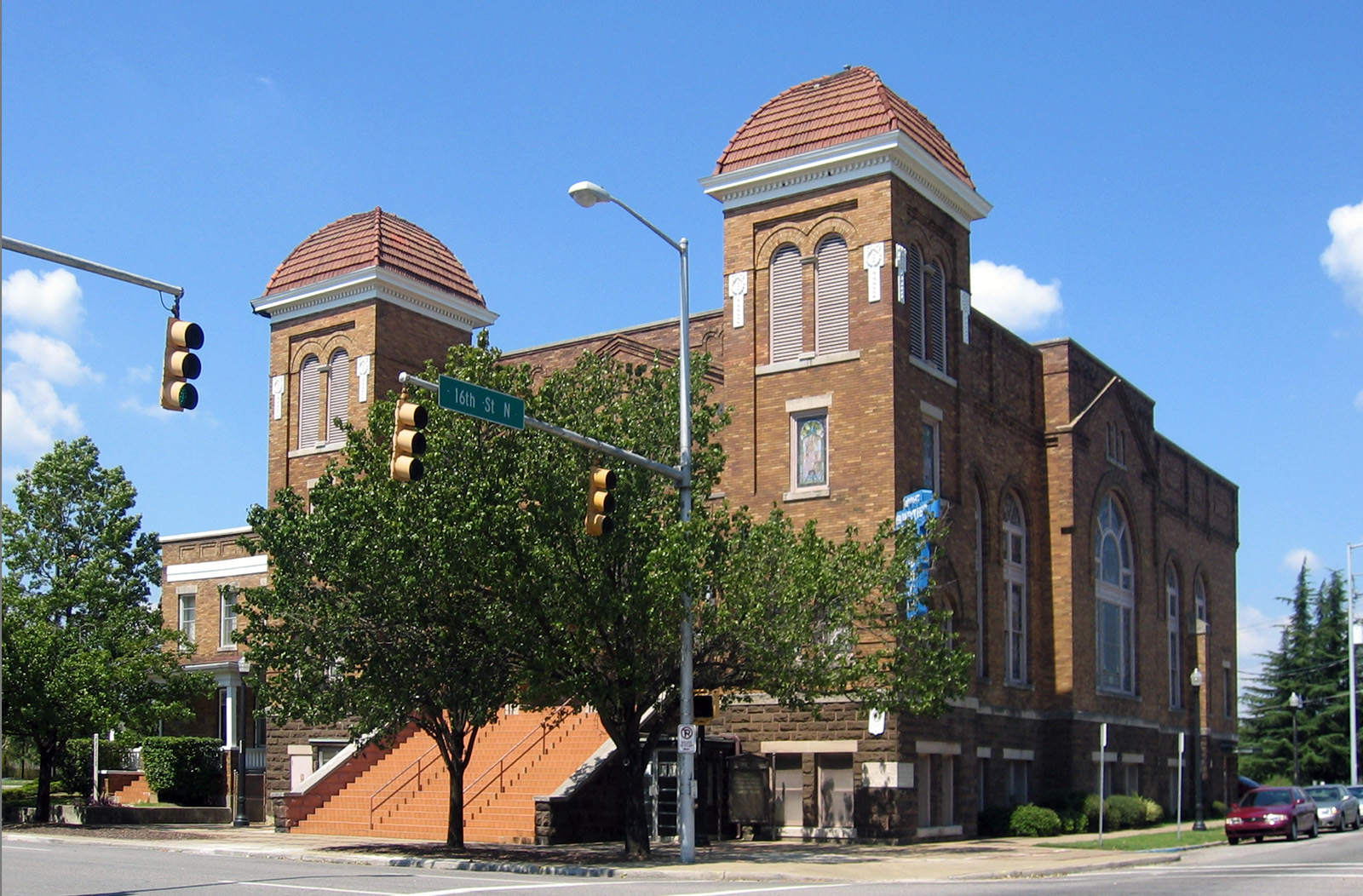
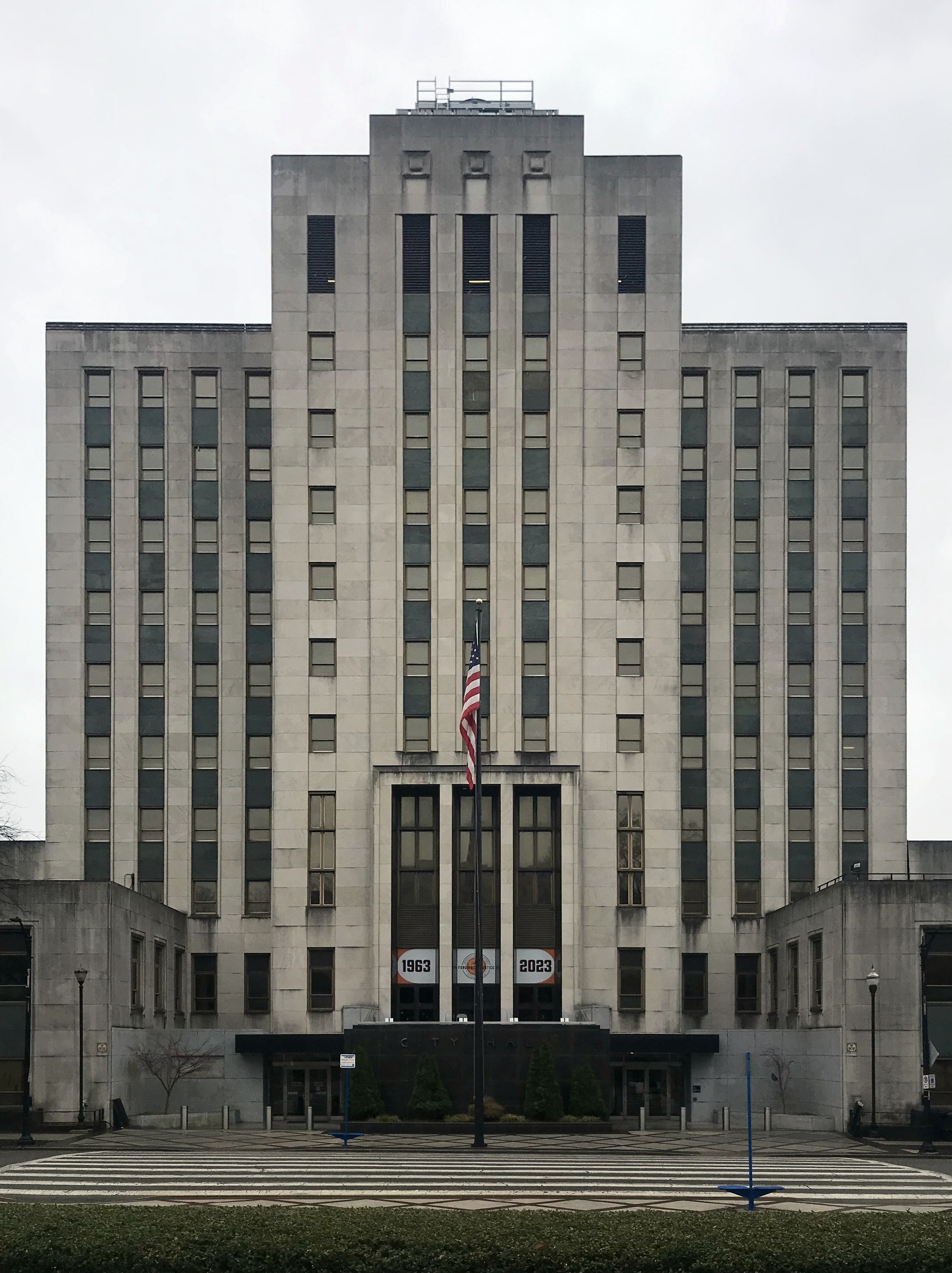
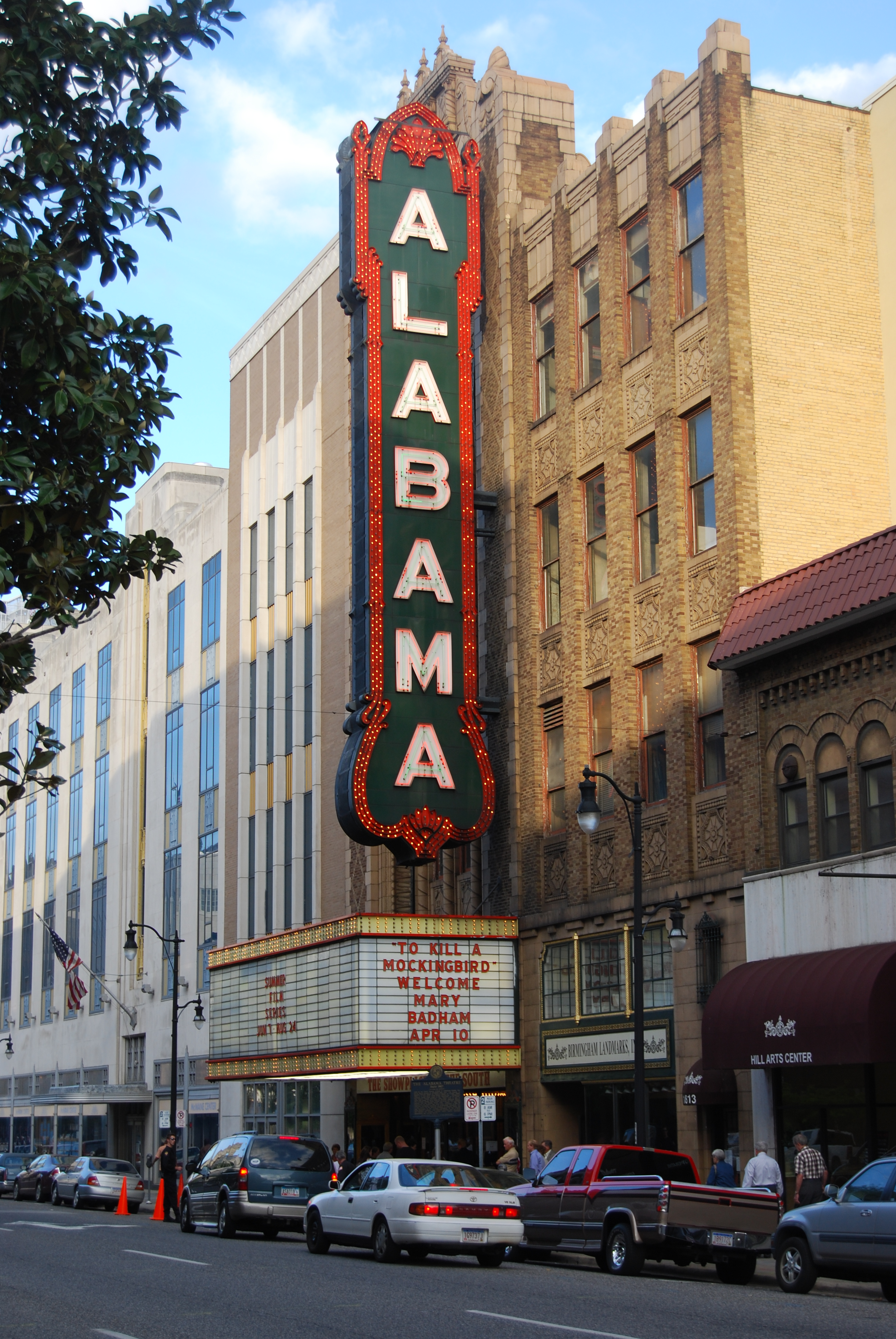
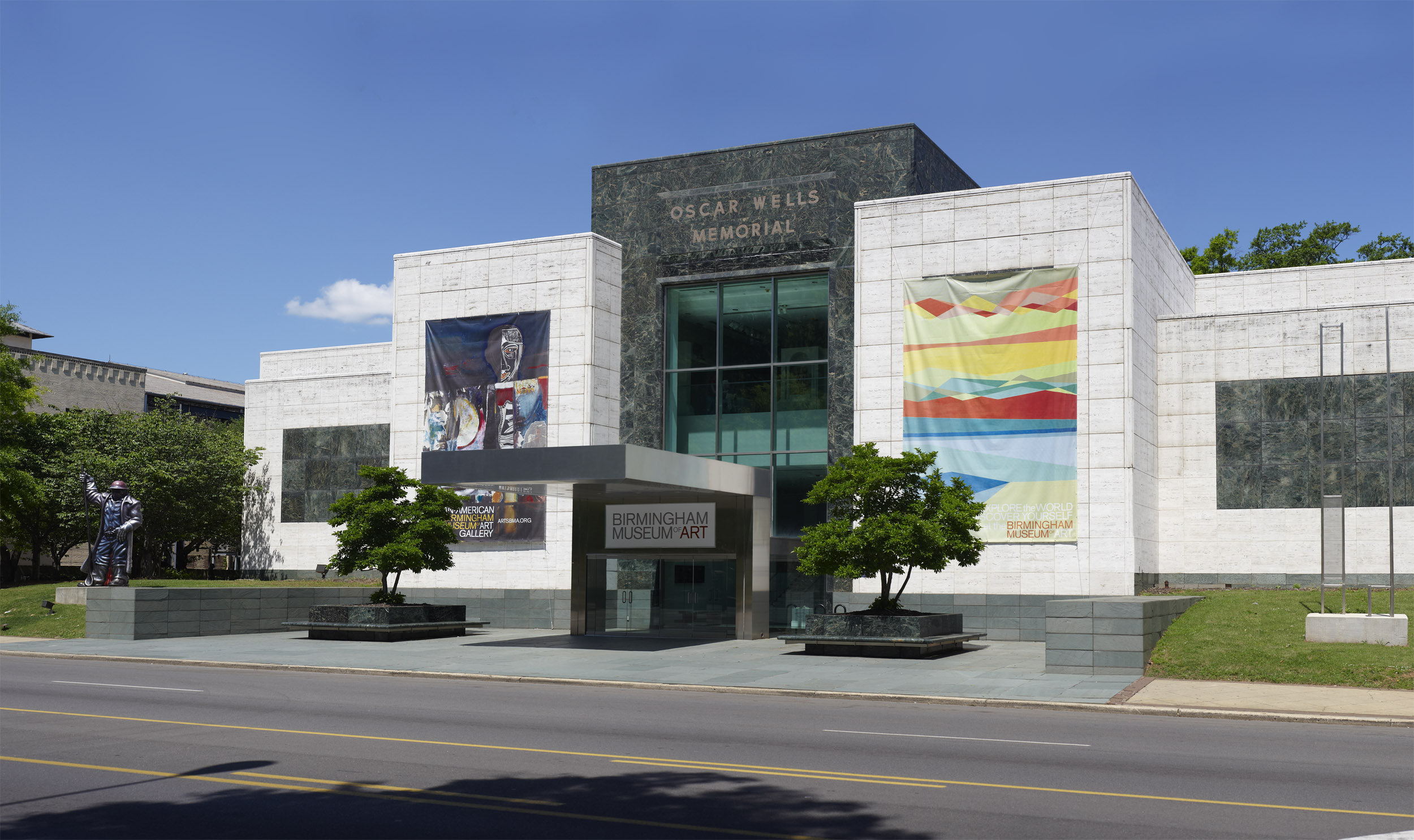
- Downtown Birmingham Vulcan 16th Street Baptist Church City Hall Alabama Theatre Birmingham Museum of Art

- Flag Seal
- Nicknames: "The Magic City", "Pittsburgh of the South"
- Interactive map of Birmingham
- Location within Alabama Location within the United States
- Coordinates: 33°31′03″N 86°48′34″W
- Country: United States
- State: Alabama
- Counties: Jefferson, Shelby
- Incorporated: December 19, 1871
- Named for: Birmingham, England

Government
  - Type: Mayor – Council
  - Mayor: Randall Woodfin (D)

Area
  - City: 149.54 sq mi (387.31 km^{2})
  - Land: 147.02 sq mi (380.77 km^{2})
  - Water: 2.52 sq mi (6.53 km^{2})
- Elevation: 597 ft (182 m)

Population (2020)
  - City: 200,733
  - Estimate (2024): 196,357
  - Rank: 131st in the United States; 2nd in Alabama
  - Density: 1,365.4/sq mi (527.17/km^{2})
  - Urban: 774,956 (US: 58th)
  - Urban density: 1,522/sq mi (587.5/km^{2})
  - Metro: 1,192,583 (47th)
  - Combined: 1,376,853 (US: 43rd)
- Demonym: Birminghamian
- Time zone: UTC−6 (CST)
  - Summer (DST): UTC−5 (CDT)
- ZIP Codes: 35201-35224, 35226, 35228-35229, 35231-35238, 35242-35244, 35246, 35249, 35253-35255, 35259-35261, 35266, 35270, 35282-35283, 35285, 35287-35288, 35290-35298
- Area codes: 205, 659
- FIPS code: 01-07000
- GNIS feature ID: 2403868
- Website: birminghamal.gov

Birmingham (/ˈbɜːrmɪŋhæm/ BUR-ming-ham) is a city in the north central region of Alabama, United States. It is the third-most populous city in the state, with an estimated population of 196,357 as of 2024. The Birmingham metropolitan area, with over 1.19 million residents, is the largest metropolitan area in Alabama and 47th-most populous in the US. Birmingham serves as a major regional economic, medical, and educational hub of the Deep South, Piedmont, and Appalachian regions. It is the county seat of Jefferson County.

Founded in 1871 during the Reconstruction era, Birmingham was formed through the merger of three smaller communities, most notably Elyton. It quickly grew into an industrial and transportation center, with a focus on mining, steel production, and railroads. Named for Birmingham, England, it developed with a labor force that included many African Americans from rural Alabama, often employed under non-union conditions. Its rapid industrial growth from 1881 to 1920 earned it the nicknames "The Magic City" and "The Pittsburgh of the South." Though the prominence of mining and heavy industry declined in the late 20th century, Birmingham remains a significant manufacturing center with a diverse economy in banking, telecommunications, transportation, medicine and higher education.

The Birmingham area serves as headquarters to Fortune 500 companies Regions Financial and Vulcan Materials Company, along with multiple other Fortune 1000 companies. The University of Alabama at Birmingham, established in 1969, includes a prominent medical school, dental school, and other professional programs, making it one of the state's leading research institutions. The area also hosts private colleges such as Samford University and Miles College, along with Jefferson State Community College and Lawson State Community College. Birmingham is also home to the headquarters of the Southeastern Conference (SEC) and Southwestern Athletic Conference (SWAC), reinforcing its cultural and athletic influence in the region.

== History ==
=== Founding and early growth ===
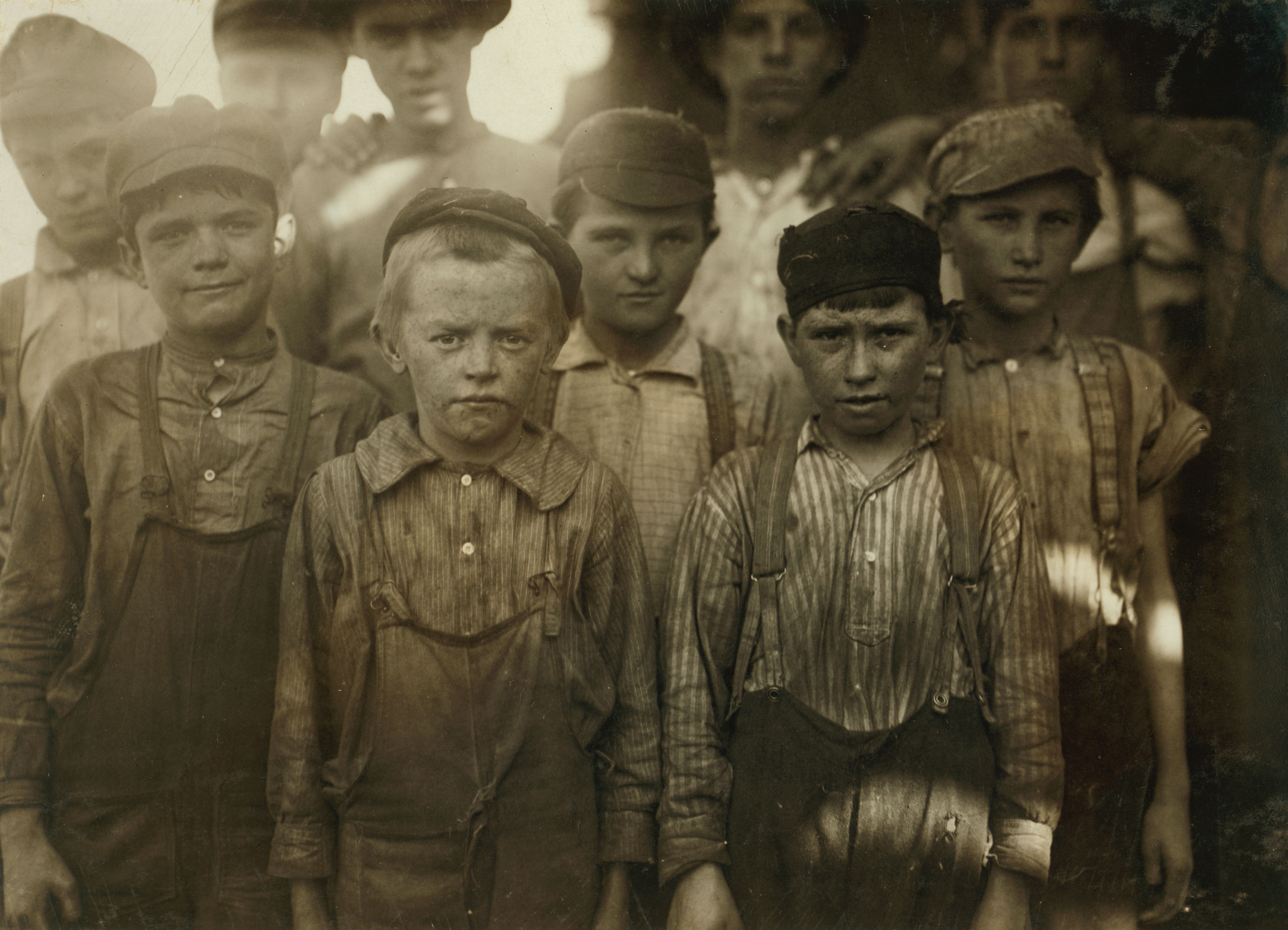
Child labor at Avondale Mills in Birmingham, 1910, photo by Lewis Hine

The Birmingham area was historically part of the territory of the Muscogee Confederacy. The most prominent Indigenous settlement in the area in the 19th century was the Upper Creek community of Tvlwv Haco, meaning 'Crazy Town' in Muscogee, located in present-day Indian Springs Village.

Birmingham was founded on June 1, 1871, by the Elyton Land Company whose investors included cotton planters, bankers and railroad entrepreneurs. It was named for the English city of Birmingham, the United Kingdom's second largest city. Most of the original settlers who founded Birmingham were of English ancestry. The Elyton Land Company sold lots near the planned crossing of the Alabama & Chattanooga and South & North Alabama railroads, including land formerly a part of the Benjamin P. Worthington plantation. The first business at that crossroads was the trading post and country store operated by Marre & Allen. The site of the railroad crossing was notable for the nearby deposits of iron ore, coal, and limestone – the three main raw materials used in making steel.

The Birmingham District is the only place worldwide where significant amounts of all three minerals can be found in close proximity. From the start the new city was planned as a great center of industry. The founders, organized as the Elyton Land Company, borrowed the name of Birmingham, one of England's main industrial cities, to advertise that point. The growth of the planned city was impeded by an outbreak of cholera, and a Wall Street crash in 1873. However, it began to develop shortly afterwards at an explosive rate.

In 1911, the town of Elyton and several other surrounding towns were absorbed into Birmingham. The start of the 20th century brought the substantial growth that gave Birmingham the nickname "The Magic City", as the downtown area developed from a low-rise commercial and residential district into a busy grid of neoclassical mid-rise and high-rise buildings and busy streetcar lines. Between 1902 and 1912 four large office buildings were constructed at the intersection of 20th Street, the central north–south spine of the city, and 1st Avenue North, which connected the warehouses and industrial facilities stretching along the east–west railroad corridor. This impressive group of early skyscrapers was nicknamed "The Heaviest Corner on Earth".

In 1916, Birmingham was hit by the Irondale earthquake, with a 5.1 magnitude. A few buildings in the area were slightly damaged. The earthquake was felt as far as Atlanta and neighboring states.

While excluded from the best-paying industrial jobs, Black Americans joined the migration of residents from rural areas to the city for its opportunities. The Great Depression of the 1930s hit Birmingham especially hard as sources of capital that were fueling the city's growth rapidly dried up at the same time that farm laborers, driven off the land, made their way to the city in search of work. New Deal programs put many city residents to work in WPA and CCC programs, making important contributions to the city's infrastructure and artistic legacy, including such key improvements as Vulcan's tower and Oak Mountain State Park.

The wartime demand for steel and the post-war building boom gave Birmingham a rapid return to prosperity. Manufacturing diversified beyond the production of raw materials. Major civic institutions such as schools, parks and museums, were able to expand their scope.

Despite the growing population and wealth of the city, its residents were markedly underrepresented in the state legislature. Although the state constitution required redistricting in accordance with changes in the decennial census, the state legislature did not undertake this until the early 1970s, when forced by a federal court case to enforce "one man, one vote". In addition, the geographic basis of the senate, which gave each county one seat, gave undue influence to rural counties. Representatives of rural counties also had disproportionate power in the state house, and failed to provide support for infrastructure and other improvements in developing urban population centers such as Birmingham. At this time, the General Assembly ran county governments as extensions of the state through their legislative delegations.

=== Birmingham civil rights movement ===
In the 1950s and 1960s Birmingham received national and international attention as a center of the civil rights struggle for African-Americans. Locally the movement's activists were led by Fred Shuttlesworth, a fiery preacher who became legendary for his fearlessness in the face of violence, notably a string of racially motivated bombings that earned Birmingham the derisive nickname "Bombingham".

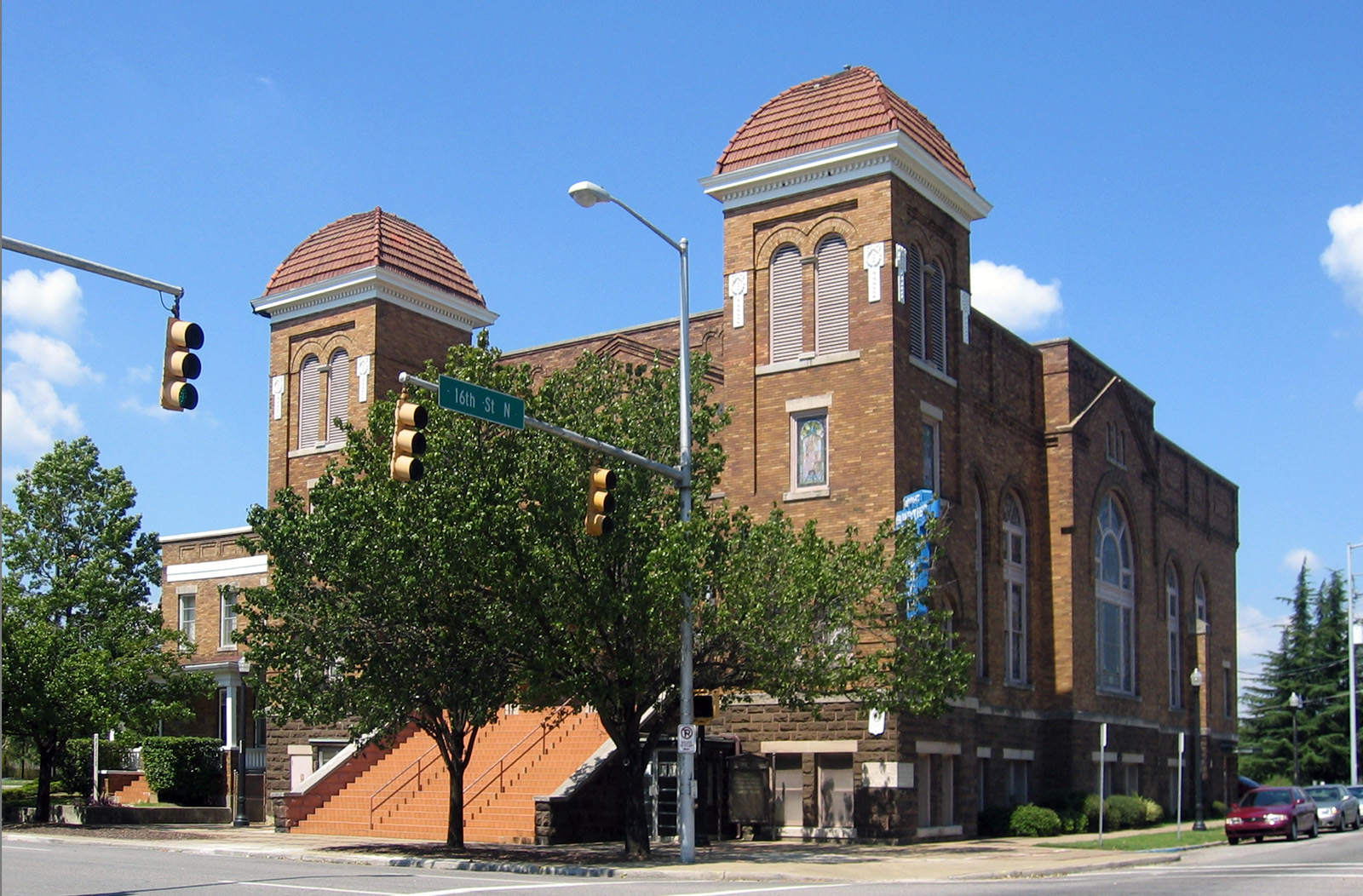
The 16th Street Baptist Church, now a National Historic Landmark

A watershed in the civil rights movement occurred in 1963 when Shuttlesworth requested that Martin Luther King Jr., and the Southern Christian Leadership Conference (SCLC), which Shuttlesworth had co-founded, come to Birmingham, where King had once been a pastor, to help end segregation. Together they launched "Project C" (for "Confrontation"), a massive assault on the Jim Crow system. In April and May daily mass marches organized and led by movement leader James Bevel were met with police repression, tear gas, attack dogs, fire hoses, and arrests. More than 3,000 people were arrested during these protests, almost all of them high-school age children. These protests were ultimately successful, leading not only to desegregation of public accommodation in Birmingham but also to the Civil Rights Act of 1964.

While imprisoned for having taken part in a nonviolent protest, Dr. King wrote the now famous April 16 Letter from Birmingham Jail, a defining treatise in his cause against segregation. Birmingham is also known for the September 15 incident, in which four black girls were killed by a bomb planted at the 16th Street Baptist Church. The event would inspire the African-American poet Dudley Randall's opus, "The Ballad of Birmingham", as well as jazz musician John Coltrane's song "Alabama".

In 1998, the Birmingham Pledge, which local attorney James Rotch wrote, was introduced at the Martin Luther King Unity Breakfast. As a grassroots community commitment to combating racism and prejudice, it has since then been used for programs in all fifty states and in more than twenty countries.

=== Recent history ===
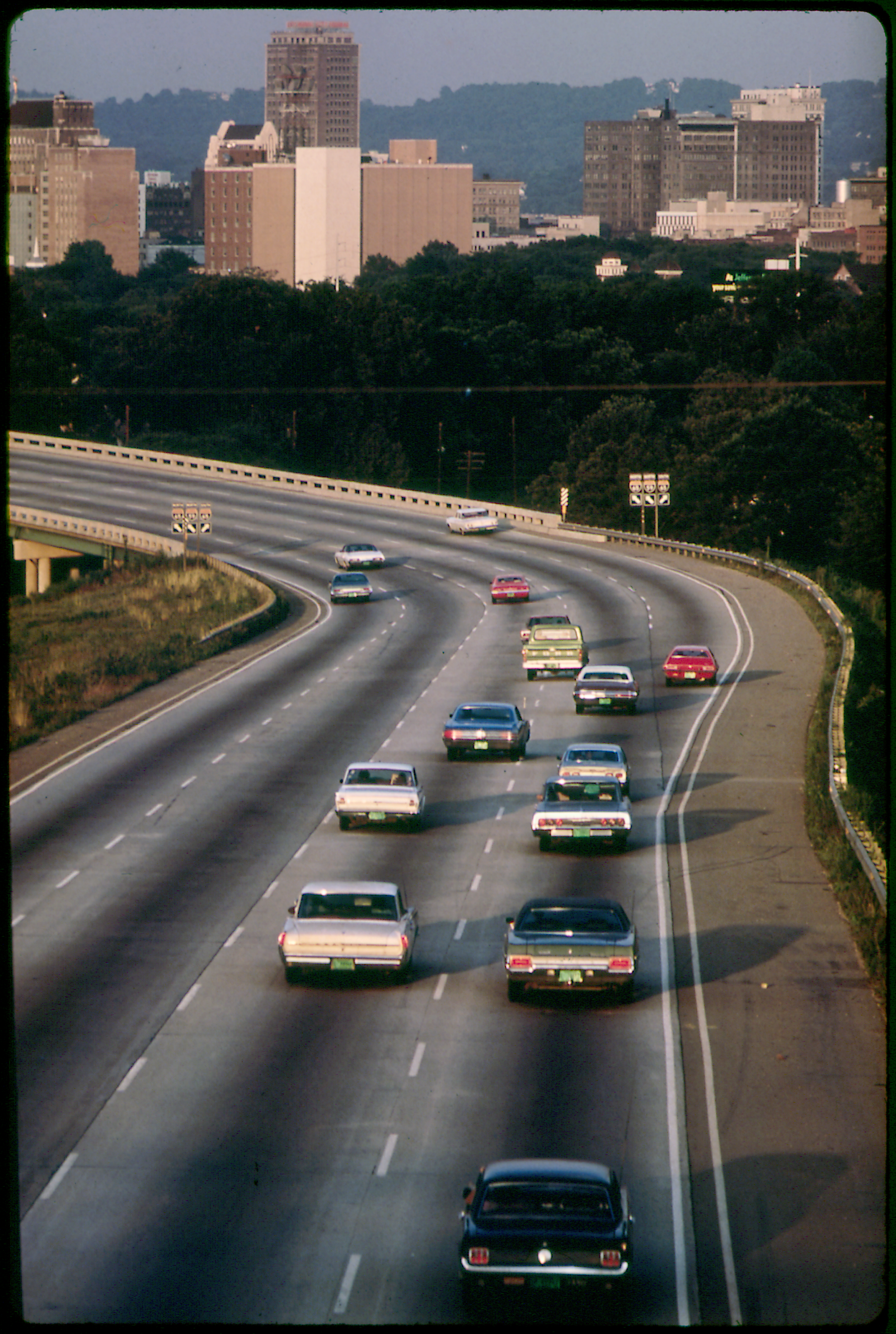
Birmingham skyline, 1972

In the 1970s, urban-renewal efforts focused around the development of the University of Alabama at Birmingham, which developed into a major medical and research center. In 1971, Birmingham celebrated its centennial with a round of public-works improvements, including an upgrade of Vulcan Park and the construction of a major downtown convention center containing a 2,500-seat symphony hall, theater, 19,000-seat arena, and exhibition halls. Birmingham's banking institutions enjoyed considerable growth as well and new skyscrapers started to appear in the city center for the first time since the 1920s. These projects helped diversify the city's economy but did not prevent the exodus of many of the city's residents to nearby independent suburbs. In 1979, Birmingham elected Dr. Richard Arrington Jr. as its first African-American mayor.

The population inside Birmingham's city limits has fallen over the past few decades, due in large part to "white flight" from the city of Birmingham proper to surrounding suburbs. The city's formerly most populous ethnic group, non-Hispanic white, has declined from 57.4 percent in 1970 to 21.1 percent in 2010. From its highest population of 340,887 in 1960, the population was down to 200,733 in 2020, a loss of about 41 percent. That same period saw a corresponding rise in the populations of the suburban communities of Hoover, Vestavia Hills, Alabaster, and Gardendale, none of which were incorporated as municipalities until after 1950.

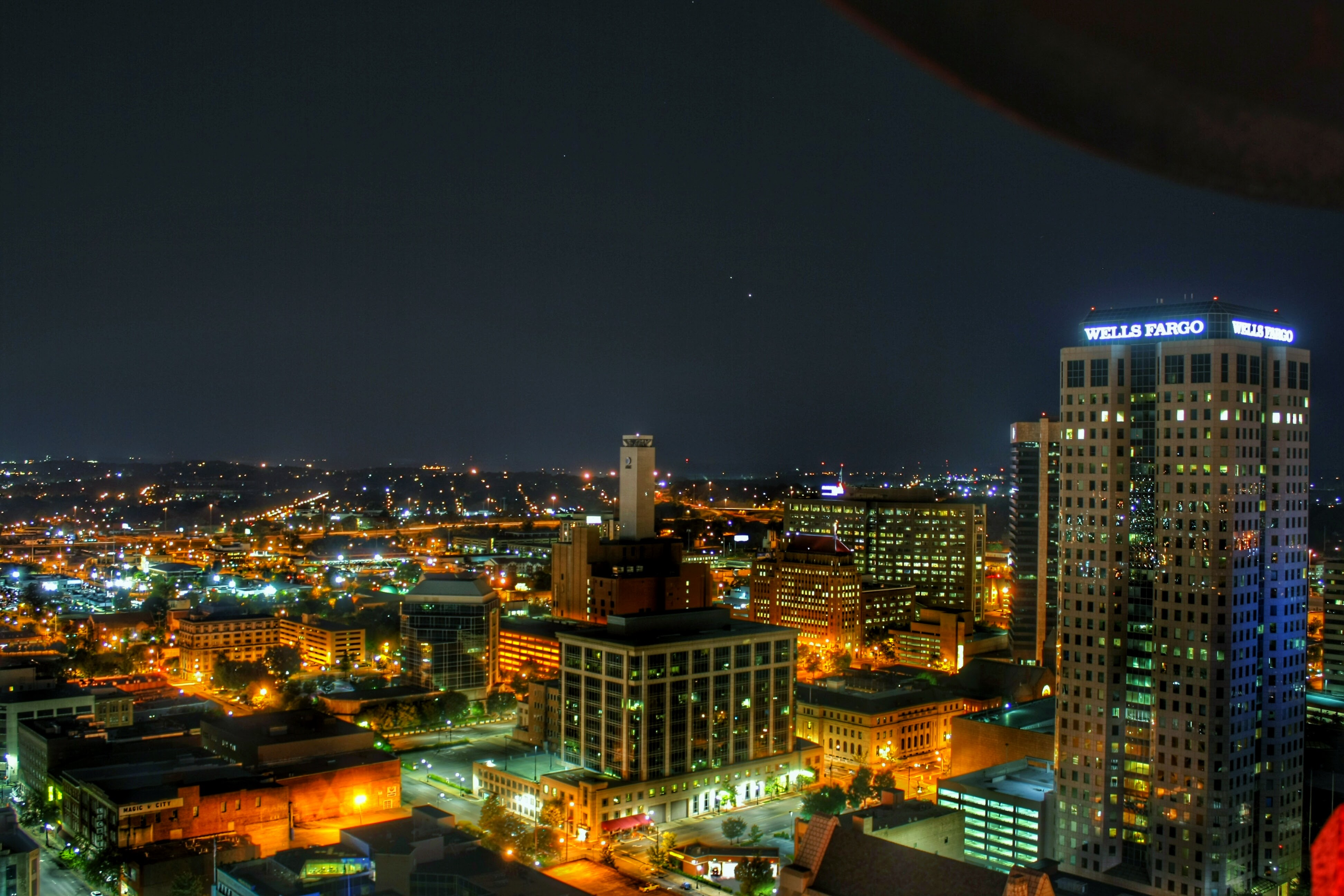
The Birmingham skyline at night from atop the City Federal Building, July 2015

In 2006, the city's visitors bureau selected "the diverse city" as a new tag line for the city. In 2011, the American Planning Association named the Highland Park neighborhood of Birmingham as a 2011 America's Great Place. In 2015, the International World Game Executive Committee selected Birmingham over Lima, Peru and Ufa, Russia, for the 2021 World Games, but the COVID-19 pandemic delayed the event by a year. After the 2020 census, Birmingham lost its long-standing status as Alabama's largest city, with Huntsville overtaking Birmingham in total population, though Birmingham remains the state's largest metropolitan area. Birmingham hosted the 2022 World Games in July 2022. In September 2024, a mass shooting occurred in Birmingham, killing four people.

== Geography ==
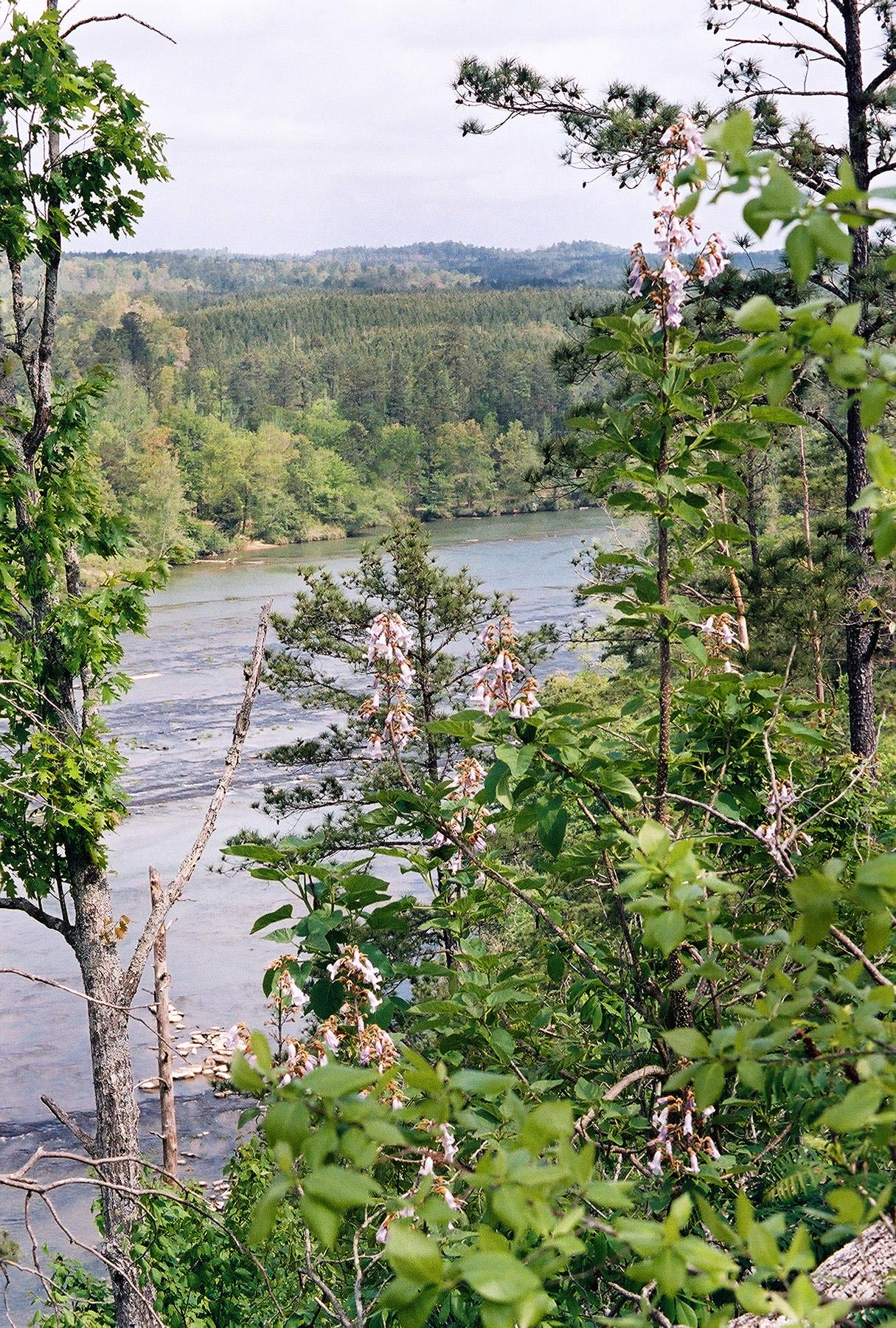
Cahaba River National Wildlife Refuge

Birmingham occupies Jones Valley, flanked by long parallel mountain ridges (the tailing ends of the Appalachian foothills – see Ridge-and-Valley Appalachians) running from north-east to south-west. The valley is drained by small creeks (Village Creek, Valley Creek) which flow into the Black Warrior River. The valley was bisected by the principal railroad corridor, along which most of the early manufacturing operations began.

Red Mountain lies immediately south of downtown. Many of Birmingham's television and radio broadcast towers are lined up along this prominent ridge. The "Over the Mountain" area, including Shades Valley, Shades Mountain and beyond, was largely shielded from the industrial smoke and rough streets of the industrial city. This is the setting for Birmingham's more affluent suburbs of Mountain Brook, Vestavia Hills, Homewood, and Hoover. South of Shades Valley is the Cahaba River basin, one of the most diverse river ecosystems in the United States.

Sand Mountain, a smaller ridge, flanks the city to the north and divides Jones Valley from much more rugged land to the north. The Louisville and Nashville Railroad (now CSX Transportation) enters the valley through Boyles Gap, a prominent gap in the long low ridge.

Ruffner Mountain, located due east of the heart of the city, is home to Ruffner Mountain Nature Center, one of the largest urban nature reserves in the United States.

According to the U.S. Census Bureau, the city has a total area of 151.9 square miles (393 km^{2}), of which, 149.9 square miles (388 km^{2}) is land and 2.0 square miles (5.2 km^{2}) (1.34%) is water.

=== Metropolitan area ===
Most of the metropolitan area lies outside of the city itself. According to the US Census Bureau, the Birmingham area consists of 7 counties and over 100 suburbs. The population of the area as of the 2020 census was 1,180,631. Some argue that the region suffers from having too many suburbs because companies can receive large incentives to move a short distance to another city, with no net gain in the area's economy.

=== Cityscape ===
Tallest buildings
Name	Stories	Height
Shipt Tower	34	454 ft (138 m)
Regions-Harbert Plaza	32	437 ft (133 m)
AT&T City Center	30	390 ft (119 m)
Regions Center	30	390 ft (119 m)
City Federal Building	27	325 ft (99 m)
Alabama Power Headquarters Building	18	322 ft (98 m)
Thomas Jefferson Tower	20	287 ft (87 m)
John Hand Building	20	284 ft (87 m)
Daniel Building	20	283 ft (86 m)

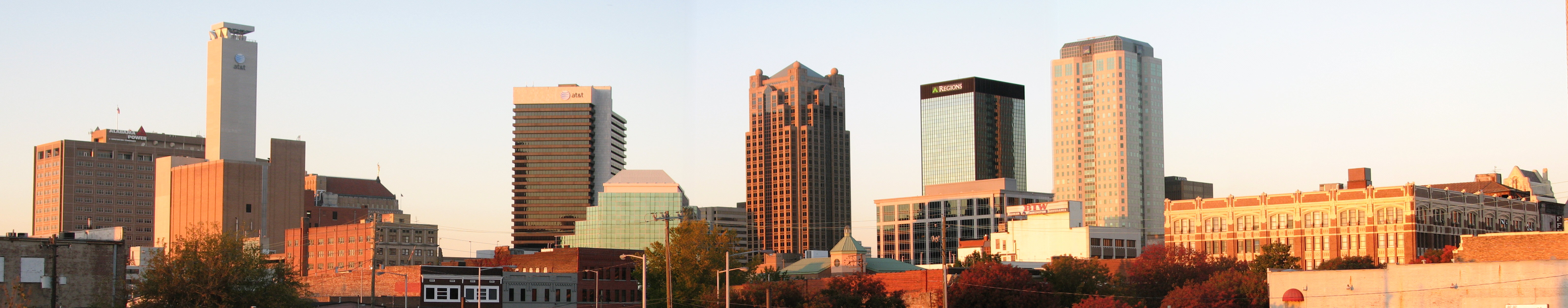
The Birmingham skyline

=== Climate ===
Birmingham has a humid subtropical climate, characterized by hot summers, mild winters, and abundant rainfall. Birmingham is primarily in USDA Hardiness Zone 8a, with some neighborhoods in Zone 8b. January has a daily mean temperature of 43.8 °F (6.6 °C). There are an average of 47 days annually with a low at or below freezing, and 1.4 days where the high does not surpass freezing. July has a daily mean temperature of 81.1 °F (27.3 °C). Highs reach or exceed 90 °F (32 °C) on 65 days per year and 100 °F (38 °C) on 2. Precipitation is relatively well-distributed throughout the year, sometimes falling in the form of snow during winter. 10.3 inches (26.2 cm) fell on March 13, 1993, during the 1993 Storm of the Century, which established the highest daily snowfall, one-storm, and winter season total on record. Normal snowfall for 1981–2010 was 1.6 in (4.1 cm). For the same period, the median monthly snowfall for each month was zero.

The summer months are hot, with high humidity. Most of the precipitation that falls in the summer are from thunderstorms, most of which occur in the afternoon and evening hours.

The spring and fall months are pleasant but variable as cold fronts frequently bring strong to severe thunderstorms and occasional tornadoes to the region. The fall season (primarily October) features less rainfall and fewer storms, as well as lower humidity than the spring, but November and early December represent a secondary severe weather season. Birmingham is located in the heart of a Tornado Alley known as the Dixie Alley due to the high frequency of tornadoes in Central Alabama. The greater Birmingham area has been hit by two F5 tornadoes; one in Birmingham's northern suburbs in 1977, and second in the western suburbs in 1998. The area was hit by an EF4 tornado which was part of a larger outbreak in April 2011. In late summer and fall months, Birmingham experiences occasional tropical storms and hurricanes due to its proximity to the Central Gulf Coast.

The record high temperature is 107 °F (42 °C), set on July 29, 1930. The record low is −10 °F (−23 °C), set on February 13, 1899.

Climate data for Birmingham–Shuttlesworth International Airport, Alabama (1991–2020 normals, (Note: Mean monthly maxima and minima (i.e. the highest and lowest temperature readings during an entire month or year) calculated based on data at said location from 1991 to 2020.) extremes 1896–present) (Note: Official records for Birmingham kept May 1896 to December 1929 at the Weather Bureau Office and at Birmingham Int'l since January 1930. For more information, see Threadex.)
Month	Jan	Feb	Mar	Apr	May	Jun	Jul	Aug	Sep	Oct	Nov	Dec	Year
Record high °F (°C)	81 (27)	88 (31)	90 (32)	92 (33)	99 (37)	106 (41)	107 (42)	105 (41)	106 (41)	101 (38)	88 (31)	80 (27)	107 (42)
Mean maximum °F (°C)	71.5 (21.9)	75.2 (24.0)	81.8 (27.7)	85.6 (29.8)	90.7 (32.6)	94.9 (34.9)	97.0 (36.1)	97.2 (36.2)	94.2 (34.6)	87.3 (30.7)	79.0 (26.1)	72.7 (22.6)	98.6 (37.0)
Mean daily maximum °F (°C)	54.5 (12.5)	59.1 (15.1)	67.1 (19.5)	75.0 (23.9)	82.0 (27.8)	88.1 (31.2)	91.0 (32.8)	90.6 (32.6)	85.9 (29.9)	76.0 (24.4)	65.0 (18.3)	56.9 (13.8)	74.3 (23.5)
Daily mean °F (°C)	44.7 (7.1)	48.8 (9.3)	56.0 (13.3)	63.6 (17.6)	71.5 (21.9)	78.3 (25.7)	81.5 (27.5)	80.9 (27.2)	75.6 (24.2)	64.9 (18.3)	54.0 (12.2)	47.4 (8.6)	63.9 (17.7)
Mean daily minimum °F (°C)	34.9 (1.6)	38.4 (3.6)	45.0 (7.2)	52.1 (11.2)	61.0 (16.1)	68.5 (20.3)	72.1 (22.3)	71.3 (21.8)	65.3 (18.5)	53.9 (12.2)	43.0 (6.1)	37.9 (3.3)	53.6 (12.0)
Mean minimum °F (°C)	15.8 (−9.0)	20.4 (−6.4)	25.6 (−3.6)	34.9 (1.6)	45.1 (7.3)	57.6 (14.2)	64.4 (18.0)	62.7 (17.1)	50.1 (10.1)	36.3 (2.4)	25.7 (−3.5)	21.0 (−6.1)	13.4 (−10.3)
Record low °F (°C)	−6 (−21)	−10 (−23)	2 (−17)	26 (−3)	36 (2)	42 (6)	51 (11)	51 (11)	37 (3)	27 (−3)	5 (−15)	1 (−17)	−10 (−23)
Average precipitation inches (mm)	5.03 (128)	4.95 (126)	5.66 (144)	5.08 (129)	4.91 (125)	4.78 (121)	5.45 (138)	4.35 (110)	4.00 (102)	3.34 (85)	4.23 (107)	4.87 (124)	56.62 (1,438)
Average snowfall inches (cm)	0.4 (1.0)	0.3 (0.76)	0.5 (1.3)	0.0 (0.0)	0.0 (0.0)	0.0 (0.0)	0.0 (0.0)	0.0 (0.0)	0.0 (0.0)	0.0 (0.0)	0.0 (0.0)	0.2 (0.51)	1.4 (3.6)
Average precipitation days (≥ 0.01 in)	10.5	10.8	11.2	9.2	9.8	11.2	11.9	10.6	7.0	7.1	8.4	10.4	118.1
Average snowy days (≥ 0.1 in)	0.2	0.3	0.2	0.0	0.0	0.0	0.0	0.0	0.0	0.0	0.0	0.1	0.8
Average relative humidity (%)	70.5	66.5	64.2	65.0	70.1	71.6	74.4	74.6	74.0	71.6	71.4	71.2	70.4
Average dew point °F (°C)	31.6 (−0.2)	33.6 (0.9)	40.8 (4.9)	48.6 (9.2)	58.1 (14.5)	65.3 (18.5)	69.1 (20.6)	68.5 (20.3)	63.1 (17.3)	51.3 (10.7)	42.8 (6.0)	35.4 (1.9)	50.7 (10.4)
Mean monthly sunshine hours	149.8	159.8	219.1	247.6	282.6	280.7	264.3	260.7	223.8	231.9	166.3	154.4	2,641
Percentage possible sunshine	47	52	59	63	66	65	60	63	60	66	53	50	59
Source 1: NOAA (relative humidity and dew point 1961–1990, sun 1961–1989)
Source 2: World Meteorological Organization (Extremes for 1961–1990)

=== Earthquakes ===
The Birmingham area is not prone to frequent earthquakes; its historical activity level is 59% less than the US average. Earthquakes are generally minor and the Birmingham area can feel an earthquake from the Eastern Tennessee Seismic Zone. The magnitude 5.1 Irondale earthquake in 1916 caused damage in the Birmingham area and was felt in the neighboring states and as far as the Carolinas. The 2003 Alabama earthquake centered in northeastern Alabama (magnitude 4.6–4.9) was also felt in Birmingham, Atlanta, Tennessee, Kentucky, and both Carolina states.

== Demographics ==
Historical population
Census	Pop.	Note	%±
1880	3,086		—
1890	26,178		748.3%
1900	38,415		46.7%
1910	132,685		245.4%
1920	178,806		34.8%
1930	259,678		45.2%
1940	267,583		3.0%
1950	326,037		21.8%
1960	340,887		4.6%
1970	300,910		−11.7%
1980	284,413		−5.5%
1990	265,968		−6.5%
2000	242,840		−8.7%
2010	212,237		−12.6%
2020	200,733		−5.4%
2025 (est.)	195,893	▼	−2.4%
U.S. Decennial Census; 1990 2000 2010 2020

=== Racial and ethnic composition ===
Birmingham city, Alabama – Racial and ethnic composition Note: the US census treats Hispanic/Latino as an ethnic category. This table excludes Latinos from the racial categories and assigns them to a separate category. Hispanics/Latinos may be of any race.
Race / Ethnicity (NH = Non-Hispanic)	Pop 1980	Pop 1990	Pop 2000	Pop 2010	Pop 2020	% 1980	% 1990	% 2000	% 2010	% 2020
White alone (NH)	124,053	95,123	57,096	44,819	45,993	43.62%	35.76%	23.51%	21.12%	22.91%
Black or African American alone (NH)	156,997	168,002	177,709	155,258	136,731	55.20%	63.17%	73.19%	73.15%	68.12%
Native American or Alaska Native alone (NH)	203	313	383	361	346	0.07%	0.12%	0.16%	0.17%	0.17%
Asian alone (NH)	923	1,431	1,900	2,132	3,255	0.32%	0.54%	0.78%	1.00%	1.62%
Native Hawaiian or Pacific Islander alone (NH)	x	x	49	48	109	x	x	0.02%	0.02%	0.05%
Other race alone (NH)	183	61	138	150	575	0.06%	0.02%	0.06%	0.07%	0.29%
Mixed race or Multiracial (NH)	x	x	1,781	1,765	4,450	x	x	0.73%	0.83%	2.22%
Hispanic or Latino (any race)	2,054	1,038	3,764	7,704	9,274	0.72%	0.39%	1.55%	3.63%	4.62%
Total	284,413	265,968	242,820	212,237	200,733	100.00%	100.00%	100.00%	100.00%	100.00%

=== 2020 census ===
As of the 2020 census, Birmingham had a population of 200,733 — 89,976 households, and 46,816 families. The median age was 36.7 years. 18.7% of residents were under the age of 18 and 16.6% of residents were 65 years of age or older. For every 100 females there were 86.8 males, and for every 100 females age 18 and over there were 83.4 males age 18 and over.

99.1% of residents lived in urban areas, while 0.9% lived in rural areas.

There were 89,976 households in Birmingham, of which 21.8% had children under the age of 18 living in them. Of all households, 21.7% were married-couple households, 26.5% were households with a male householder and no spouse or partner present, and 45.3% were households with a female householder and no spouse or partner present. About 42.1% of all households were made up of individuals and 12.5% had someone living alone who was 65 years of age or older.

There were 106,713 housing units, of which 15.7% were vacant. The homeowner vacancy rate was 2.1% and the rental vacancy rate was 12.3%.

=== 2010 census ===
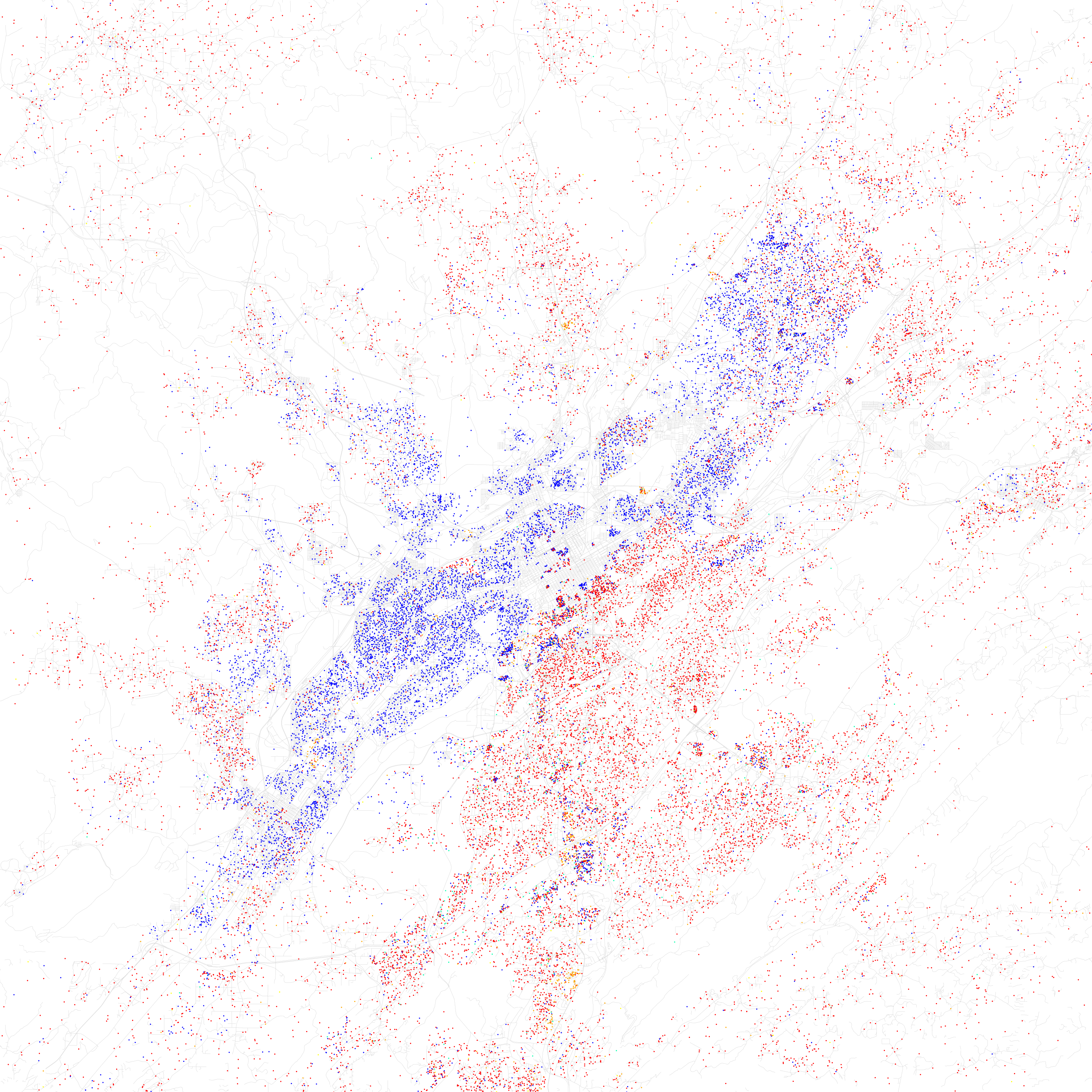
A racial distribution map of Birmingham, 2010 U.S. census

=== 2000 census ===
In the 2000 census, there were 242,820 people, 98,782 households, and 59,269 families living in Birmingham. The population density was 1,619.7 inhabitants per square mile (625.4/km^{2}). There were 111,927 housing units at an average density of 746.6 per square mile (288.3/km^{2}). The racial makeup of the city was 62.46% Black, 35.07% White, 0.17% Native American, 0.80% Asian, 0.04% Pacific Islander, 0.62% from other races, and 0.83% from two or more races. 1.55% of the population were Hispanic or Latino of any race.

There were 98,782 households, out of which 27.7% had children under the age of 18 living with them, 31.1% were married couples living together, 24.6% had a female householder with no husband present, and 40.0% were non-families. 34.4% of all households were made up of individuals, and 10.4% had someone living alone who was 65 years of age or older.

In Birmingham, 25.0% of the population was under the age of 18, 11.1% was from 18 to 24, 30.0% from 25 to 44, 20.4% from 45 to 64, and 13.5% was 65 years of age or older. The median age was 34 years. For every 100 females there were 85.7 males.

The median income for a household in the city was $31,898, and the median income for a family was $38,776. Males had a median income of $36,031 versus $30,367 for females. The city's per capita income was $19,962. About 22.5% of families and 27.3% of the population were below the poverty line, including 41.9% of those under the age of 18 and 18.3% of those age 65 or over.

=== Religion ===
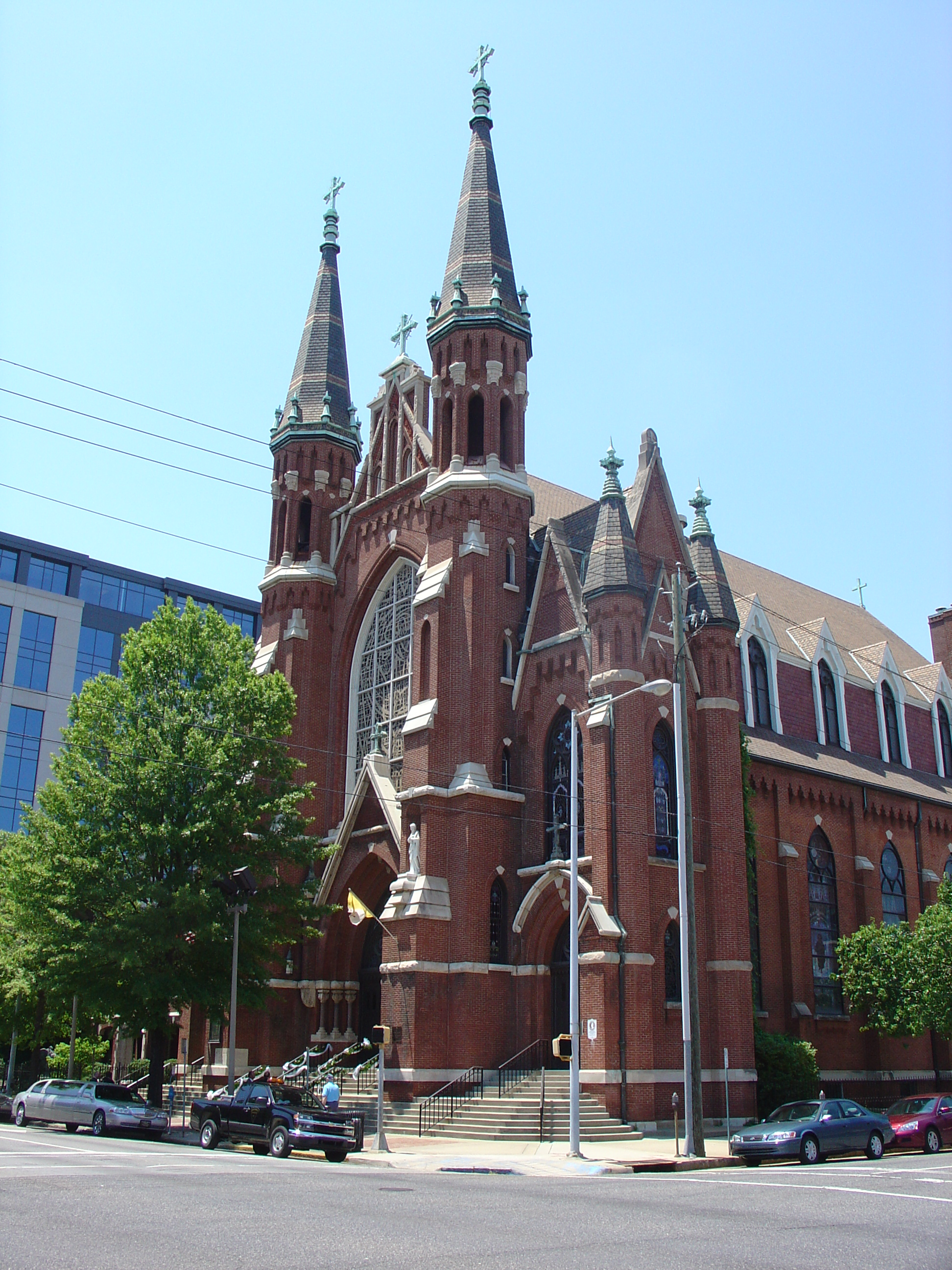
St. Paul's Cathedral in downtown Birmingham

The Association of Statisticians of American Religious Bodies published data showing that in 2010, among metro areas with a greater than one million population, Birmingham had the second highest ratio of Christians, and the greatest ratio of Protestant adherents, in the United States.

The Southern Baptist Convention has 673 congregations and 336,000 members in the Birmingham Metro area. The United Methodists have 196 congregations and 66,759 members. The headquarters of the Presbyterian Church in America had been in Birmingham until the early 1980s; the PCA has more than 30 congregations and almost 15,000 members in the Birmingham-Hoover Metropolitan area with megachurches like Briarwood Presbyterian Church. The National Baptist Convention has 126 congregations and 69,800 members.

The city is home to the Roman Catholic Diocese of Birmingham, covering 39 counties and comprising 75 parishes and missions as well as seven Catholic high schools and nineteen elementary schools; there are also two Eastern Catholic parishes in the Birmingham area. The Catholic television network EWTN is headquartered in metropolitan Birmingham. There are three Eastern Orthodox Churches in the Metro Area as well, Greek, Russian and American. There is also a Unitarian Universalist church in the Birmingham area.

The main campus of the Church of the Highlands is located in Birmingham. The church operates schools and churches across Alabama.

== Economy ==
=== Steel ===
From Birmingham's early days onward, the steel industry has always played a crucial role in the local economy. Though the steel industry no longer has the same prominence it once held in Birmingham, steel production and processing continue to play a key role in the economy. Steel products manufacturers American Cast Iron Pipe Company (ACIPCO) and McWane are based in the city. Several of the nation's largest steelmakers, including CMC Steel, U.S. Steel, and Nucor, also have a major presence in Birmingham. In recent years, local steel companies have announced about $100 million worth of investment in expansions and new plants in and around the city. Vulcan Materials Company, a major provider of crushed stone, sand, and gravel used in construction, is based in Birmingham.

=== Biotechnology ===
In the 1970s and 1980s, Birmingham's economy was transformed by investments in bio-technology and medical research at the University of Alabama at Birmingham (UAB) and its adjacent hospital. The UAB Hospital is a Level I trauma center providing health care and breakthrough medical research. UAB is now the area's largest employer and the second largest in Alabama with a workforce of about 18,750 as of 2011. Health care services providers HealthSouth, Surgical Care Affiliates and Diagnostic Health Corporation are headquartered in the city. Caremark Rx was also founded in the city.

=== Banking ===
Birmingham is a leading banking center and the headquarters of Regions Financial Corporation. Banks with over a 5% market share of deposits in Birmingham are Regions Financial Corporation, PNC Financial Services, Servisfirst Bank, and Wells Fargo.

Nearly a dozen smaller banks have been headquartered in the Magic City, such as Superior Bancorp and Cadence Bank. As of 2009, the finance & banking sector in Birmingham employed 1,870 financial managers, 1,530 loan officers, 680 securities commodities and financial services sales agents, 380 financial analysts, 310 financial examiners, 220 credit analysts, and 130 loan counselors.

In 2012, Birmingham was the 9th largest banking hub in the United States by the amount of locally headquartered deposits. In 2014, Birmingham was the 10th largest banking center.

=== Construction and engineering ===
Birmingham is a powerhouse of construction and engineering companies, including BE&K, Brasfield & Gorrie, Robins & Morton, and B.L. Harbert International which routinely are included in the Engineering News-Record lists of top design and international construction firms.

=== Beverages ===
Two of the largest soft-drink bottlers in the United States, each with more than $500 million in sales per year, are located in Birmingham. The Buffalo Rock Company, founded in 1901, was formerly a maker of just ginger ale, but now it is a major bottler for the Pepsi Cola Company. Coca-Cola Bottling Company United, founded in 1902, is the third-largest bottler of Coca-Cola products in the U.S.

=== Other large companies ===
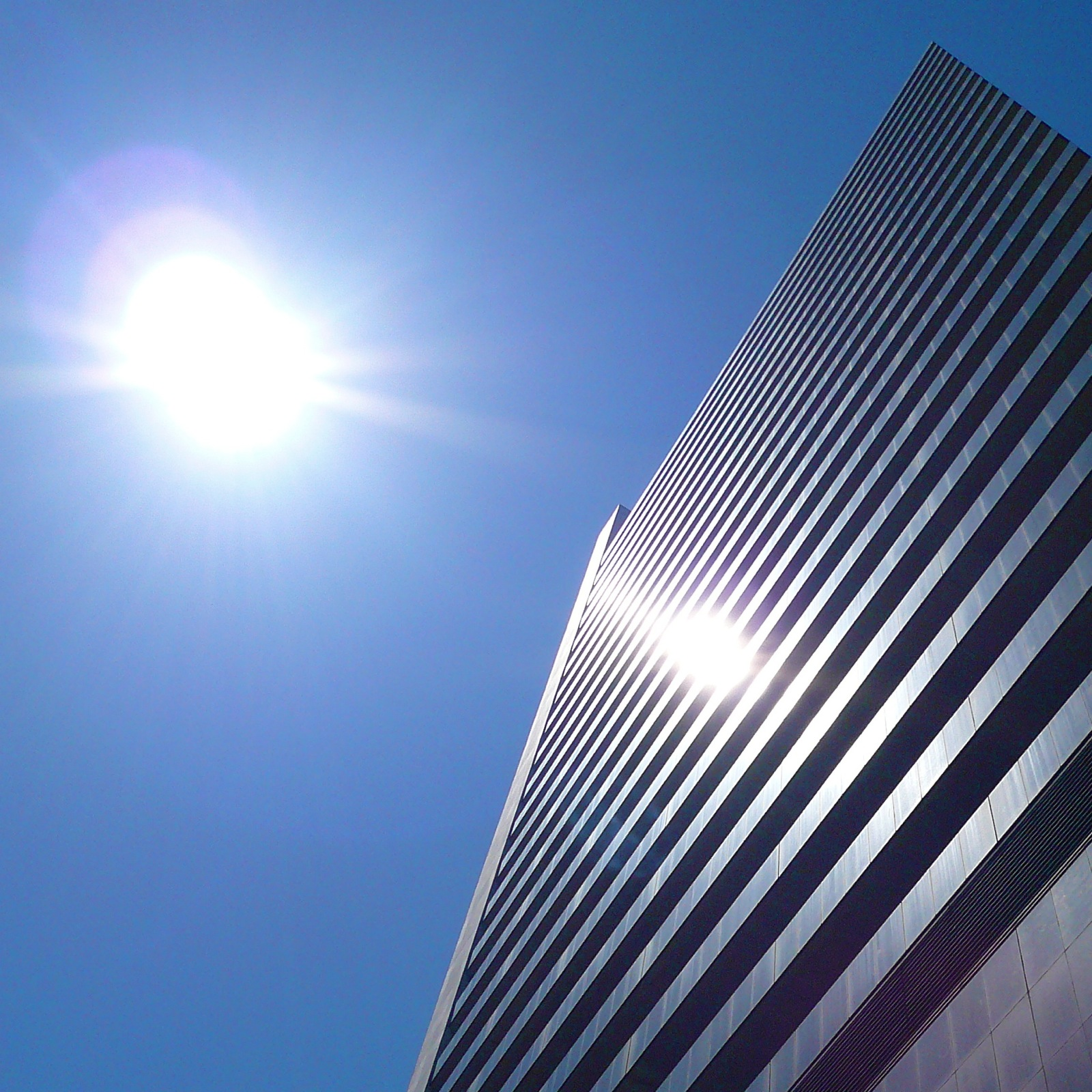
AT&T City Center in downtown

AT&T has a major nexus in Birmingham, supported by a skyscraper downtown as well as several large operational center buildings and a data center. Blue Cross and Blue Shield of Alabama, Protective Life, ProAssurance, and Liberty National are headquartered in the city.

Birmingham has seen a noticeable decrease in the number of Fortune 500 companies headquartered in the city, due to mergers, moves, and buy-outs. In 2000, there were ten Fortune 500 companies headquartered in the city, while in 2014 there was only one, Regions Bank. Birmingham used to be home to more than thirty publicly traded companies, but in 2011 there were only fifteen. This number has increased since, but not significantly. Some companies such as Zoe's Kitchen were founded and operated in Birmingham, but have since moved their headquarters. Birmingham has rebounded with the growth of companies like Encompass Health Corporation (formerly Healthsouth), Alabama Power Company, Hibbett Sports, Autocar Company, and Books-A-Million. Food companies such as Chester's, Jack's, Grapico, Red Diamond, Milo's Hamburgers, and Yogurt Mountain are also based in Birmingham.

=== Taxes and government ===
Birmingham's sales tax, which also applies fully to groceries, is 10%, making it the highest tax rate of the nation's 100 largest cities.

Although Jefferson County's bankruptcy filing was the largest government bankruptcy in U.S. history in 2011, Birmingham remains solvent.

=== Largest companies ===
In 2021, Birmingham's largest public companies by market capitalization were Regions Bank (RF, $14.61 billion), Vulcan Materials (VMC, $8.45 billion), Energen (EGN, $6.47 billion), Protective Life (PL, $5.47 billion), and HealthSouth (HLS, $3.15 billion). All were listed on the New York Stock Exchange.

Energen sold one of its largest subsidiaries, Alagasco, and Protective Life was bought by Dai-ichi Life and removed from stock exchanges. If Alabama Power were considered to be independent of the Southern Company (headquartered in Atlanta), it would be the largest company with more than $5.9 billion in revenue in 2014.

In 2021, Birmingham's largest private companies by annual revenue and employees were O'Neal Industries ($2.66 billion; 550 employees), EBSCO Industries ($2.5 billion; 1,220 employees), Drummond Company ($2.4 billion; 1,380 employees), Brasfield & Gorrie, LLC ($2.2 billion; 973 employees), and McWane ($1.7 billion, 620 employees).

== Culture ==
Birmingham is the cultural and entertainment capital of Alabama with numerous art galleries in the area including the Birmingham Museum of Art, the largest art museum in the Southeast. Downtown Birmingham is currently experiencing a cultural and economic rejuvenation, with several new independent shops and restaurants opening in the area. Birmingham is also home to the state's major ballet, opera, and symphony orchestra companies such the Alabama Ballet, Alabama Symphony Orchestra, Birmingham Ballet, Birmingham Concert Chorale, and Opera Birmingham.

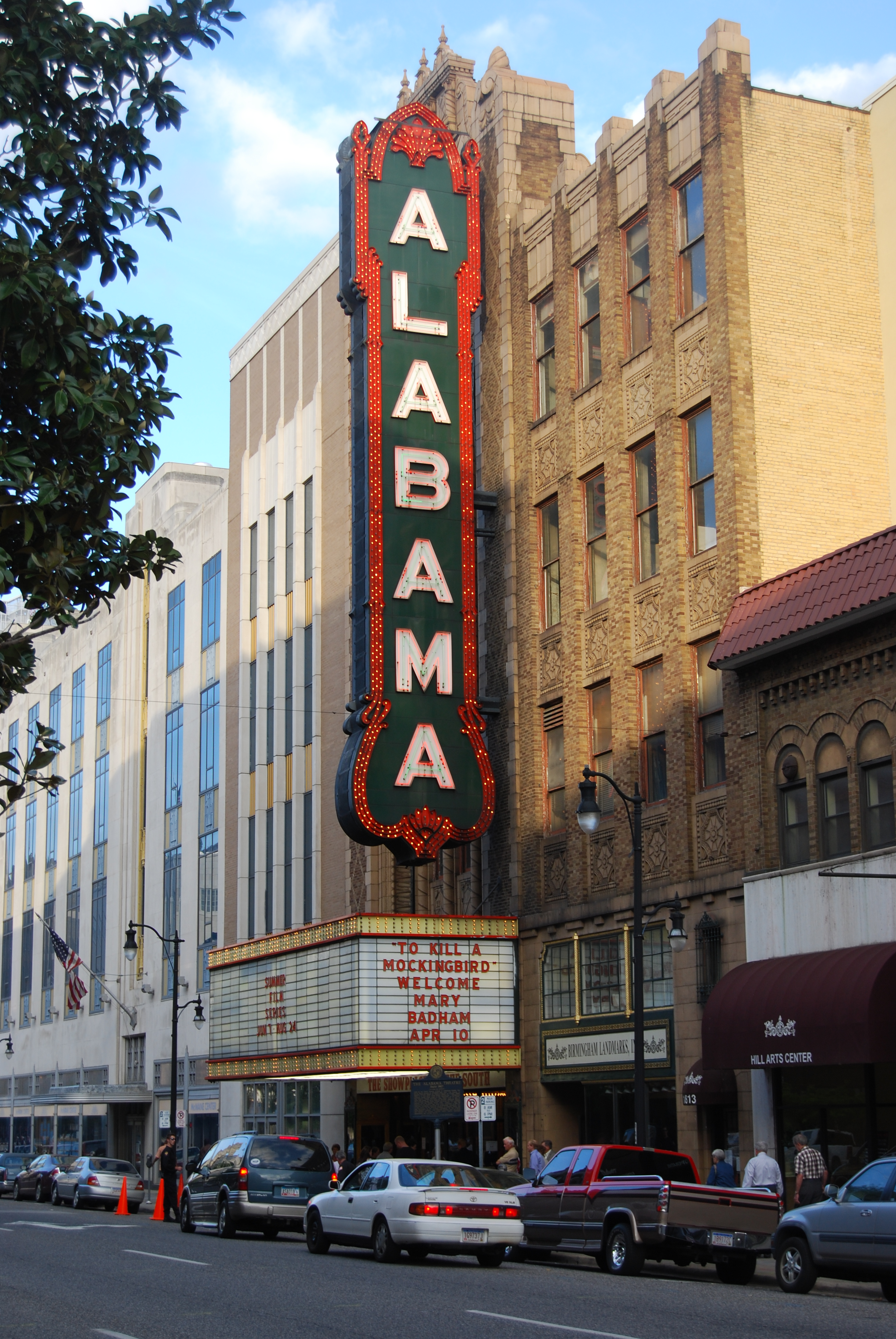
The Alabama Theatre, 2010

- The Alabama Federation of Women's Clubs was established in Birmingham in 1895.
- The historic Alabama Theatre hosts film screenings, concerts and performances.
- The Alys Stephens Center for the Performing Arts is home to Alabama Symphony Orchestra and Opera Birmingham as well as several series of concerts and lectures. It is located on the campus of the University of Alabama at Birmingham.
- The Birmingham-Jefferson Convention Complex (BJCC), houses a theater, concert hall, exhibition halls, and a sports and concert arena. The BJCC is home to the Birmingham Children's Theatre, one of the oldest and largest children's theatres in the country, and hosts major concert tours and sporting events. Adjacent to the BJCC is the Sheraton Birmingham, the largest hotel in the state. A Westin Hotel anchors the nearby Uptown entertainment district of downtown Birmingham, which opened in 2013.
- The historic Carver Theatre, home of the Alabama Jazz Hall of Fame, offers concerts, plays, jazz classes (free to any resident of the state of Alabama) and many other events in the Historic 4th Avenue District, near the Birmingham Civil Rights Institute.
- The Birmingham Public Library, the downtown hub of a 40-branch metro library system, presents programs for children and adults.
- Boutwell Auditorium (formerly Municipal Auditorium) is located at Linn Park.
- Oak Mountain Amphitheater was a large outdoor venue with two stages, located in the suburb of Pelham just south of Birmingham. It closed in 2024 after 38 years in operation.

Other entertainment venues in the area include:

- Birmingham CrossPlex/Fair Park Arena, on the west side of town, hosts sporting events, local concerts and community programs.
- Workplay, located in the Southside community, is a multi-purpose facility with offices, audio and film production space, a lounge, and a theater and concert stage for visiting artists and film screenings.
- Sidewalk Moving Picture Festival, a celebration of new independent cinema in downtown Birmingham, was named one of Time magazine's "Film Festivals for the Rest of Us" in the June 5, 2006, issue.
- The Wright Center Concert Hall, a 2,500-seat facility at Samford University, is home to the Birmingham Ballet.

Birmingham's nightlife is primarily clustered around Five Points South and Lakeview. In addition, a $55-million "Uptown" entertainment district has recently opened adjacent to the BJCC featuring a number of restaurants and a Westin hotel.

The Cultural Alliance of Greater Birmingham maintains Birmingham365.org, "a one-stop source for finding out what's going on where around" Birmingham.

=== Museums ===
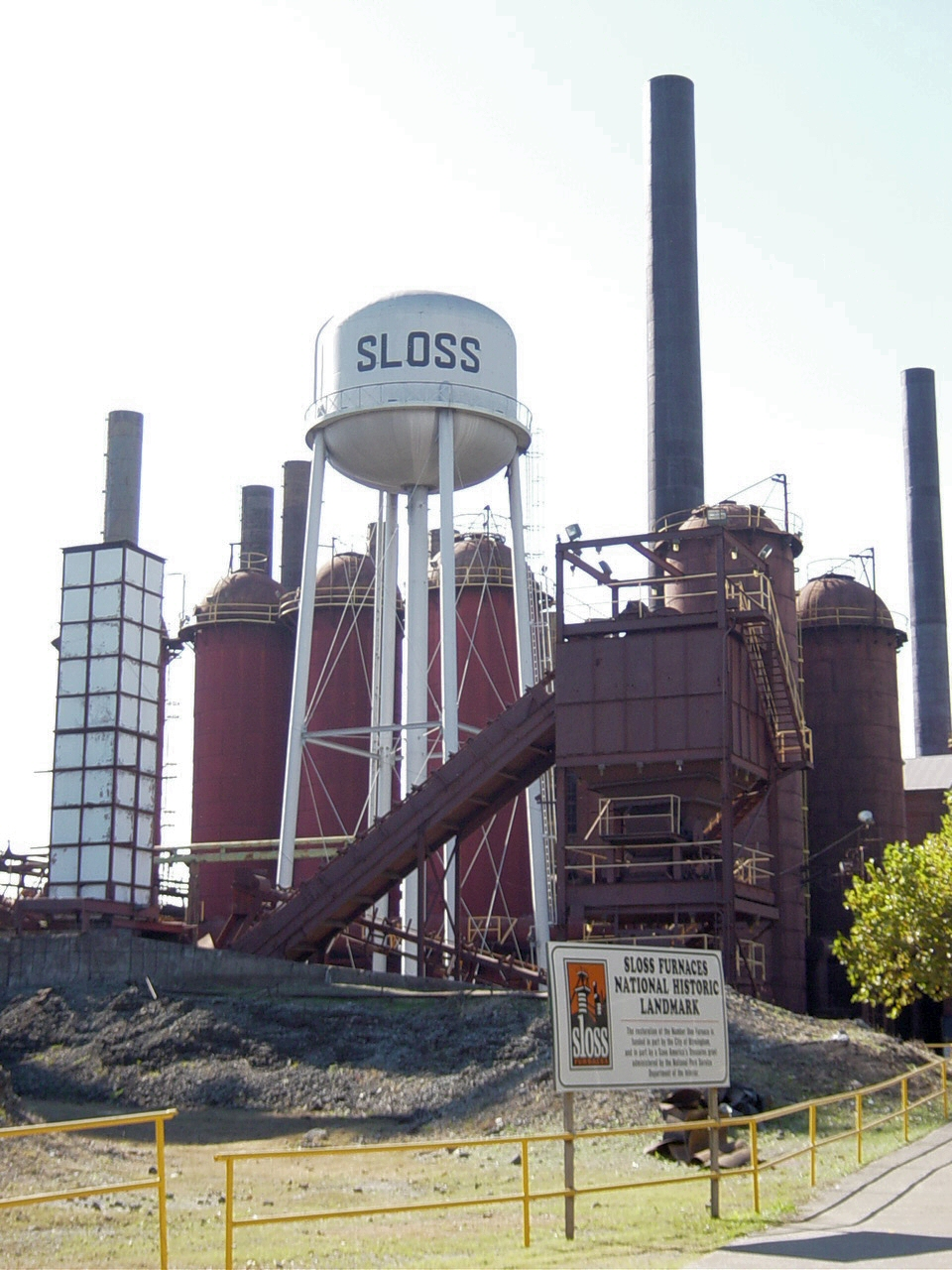
The Sloss Furnaces

Birmingham is home to several museums. The largest is the Birmingham Museum of Art, which is also the largest municipal art museum in the Southeast. The area's history museums include the Birmingham Civil Rights Institute, which houses a detailed and emotionally charged narrative exhibit putting Birmingham's history into the context of the U.S. Civil Rights Movement. It is located on Kelly Ingram Park adjacent to the 16th Street Baptist Church.

Other history museums include the Southern Museum of Flight, Bessemer Hall of History, Sloss Furnaces National Historic Landmark, Alabama Museum of Health Sciences, and the Arlington Home.

The Alabama Jazz Hall of Fame is housed in the historic Carver Theatre, and offers exhibits about the numerous notable jazz musicians from the state of Alabama.

The McWane Science Center is a regional science museum with hands-on science exhibits, temporary exhibitions, and an IMAX dome theater. The center also houses a major collection of fossil specimens for use by researchers. Other unique museums include the Alabama Jazz Hall of Fame; the Barber Vintage Motorsports Museum, which contains the largest collection of motorcycles in the world; the Iron & Steel Museum of Alabama at Tannehill Ironworks Historical State Park, near McCalla; the Alabama Sports Hall of Fame; and the Talladega Superspeedway International Motorsports Hall of Fame museum.

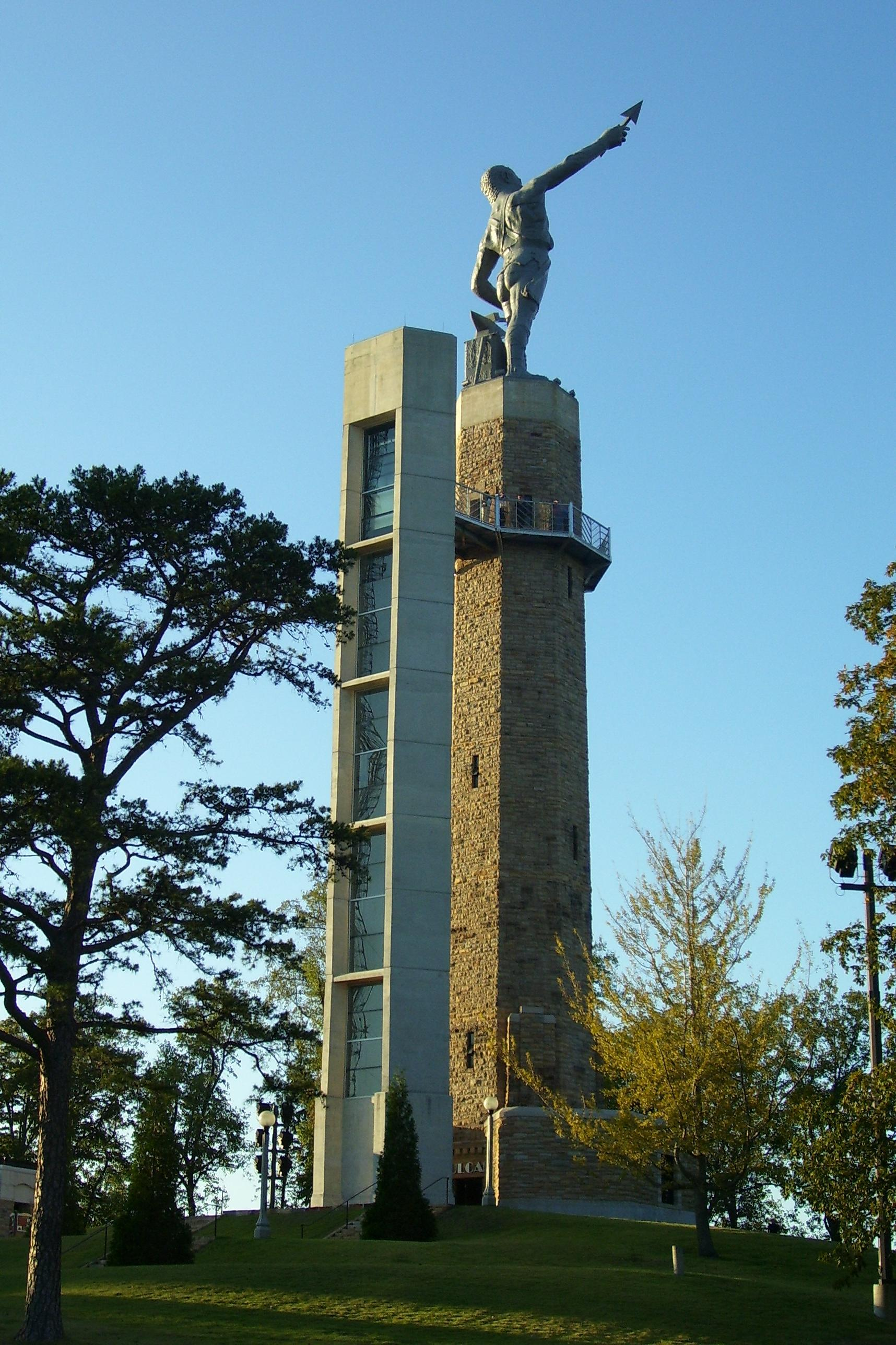
The Vulcan statue on a pedestal in Vulcan Park atop Red Mountain

South of downtown, on Red Mountain, Vulcan Park features the world's largest cast iron statue, depicting Vulcan at his forge. It was cast for the 1904 St. Louis Exposition, and erected at Vulcan Park in 1938. Open to visitors, the tower offers views of the city below.

=== Festivals ===
Birmingham is home to numerous cultural festivals showcasing music, films, and regional heritage. Sidewalk Moving Picture Festival brings filmmakers from all over the world to Birmingham to have their films viewed and judged. This festival usually is scheduled in late August at eight venues around downtown. Screenings are concentrated at the Alabama Theatre.

Another musical festival is the Taste of 4th Avenue Jazz Festival, presented at the end of August each year, concurrent with the Sidewalk Moving Picture Festival. This all day festival features national and local jazz acts. In 2007, the festival drew an estimated 6,000 people. The Birmingham Folk Festival is an annual event held since 2006. It moved to Avondale Park in 2008. In 2009 the festival featured nine local bands and three touring "headliner bands".

The Southern Heritage Festival began in the 1960s as a music, arts, and entertainment festival for the African-American community to attract mostly younger demographics. Do Dah Day is an annual pet parade held around the end of May. The Schaeffer Eye Center Crawfish Boil, an annual music festival event held in May to benefit local charities, always includes an all-star cast of talent. It typically draws more than 30,000 spectators for the annual two-day event. The annual Greek Festival, a celebration of Greek heritage, culture, and especially cuisine, is a charity fundraiser hosted by the Greek Orthodox Holy Trinity - Holy Cross Cathedral. The Greek Festival draws 20,000 patrons annually. The Lebanese Food Festival is held at St. Elias Maronite Church. Magic City Brewfest is an annual festival benefiting local grassroots organization, Free the Hops, and focusing on craft beer. Alabama Bound is an annual book and author fair that celebrates Alabama authors and publishers. Hosted by the Birmingham Public Library, it is an occasion when fans may meet their favorite authors, buy their books, and hear them read from and talk about their work. Book signings follow each presentation.

=== Other attractions ===
The Birmingham Zoo is a large regional zoo with more than 700 animals and an interactive children's zoo. South of downtown, on Red Mountain, Vulcan Park features the world's largest cast iron statue, depicting Vulcan at his forge. It was cast for the 1904 St. Louis Exposition, and erected at Vulcan Park in 1938.

The Birmingham Botanical Gardens is a 67-acre (270,000 m^{2}) park displaying a wide variety of plants in interpretive gardens, including formal rose gardens, tropical greenhouses, and a large Japanese garden. The facility also includes a white-tablecloth restaurant, meeting rooms, and an extensive reference library. It is complemented by Hoover's 30-acre (120,000 m^{2}) Aldridge Botanical Gardens, an ambitious project open since 2002. Splash Adventure (formerly VisionLand and Alabama Adventure) in Bessemer serves as the Birmingham area's water and theme park, featuring numerous slides, and water-themed attractions.

Kelly Ingram Park is the site of notable civil rights protests; the park is adjacent to the historic 16th Street Baptist Church. Railroad Park opened in 2010 in downtown Birmingham's Railroad Reservation District. Oak Mountain State Park is about 10 miles (16 km) south of Birmingham. Red Mountain is one of the southernmost wrinkles in the Appalachian chain, and a scenic drive to the top provides views reminiscent of the Great Smoky Mountains further north. To the west of the city is located Tannehill Ironworks Historical State Park, a 1,500-acre (6.1 km^{2}) Civil War site which includes the well-preserved ruins of the Tannehill Iron Furnaces and the John Wesley Hall Grist Mill.

The Summit is an upscale lifestyle center with many stores and restaurants. It is located in Southeast Birmingham off of U.S. Highway 280, parallel to Interstate 459.

== Sports ==
Current professional teams
Sports Franchise	League	Sport	Stadium (capacity)
Birmingham Barons	Southern League (AA)	Baseball	Regions Field (8,500)
Birmingham Legion FC	USLC	Soccer	Protective Stadium (47,100)
Birmingham Squadron	NBA G League	Basketball	Legacy Arena (17,654)
Birmingham Stallions	UFL	Football	Protective Stadium (47,100)
Birmingham Bulls	SPHL	Hockey	Pelham Civic Center (4,100)

- Birmingham is home to the Birmingham Barons, the AA minor league affiliate of the Chicago White Sox, which plays at Regions Field in the Southside adjacent to Railroad Park.

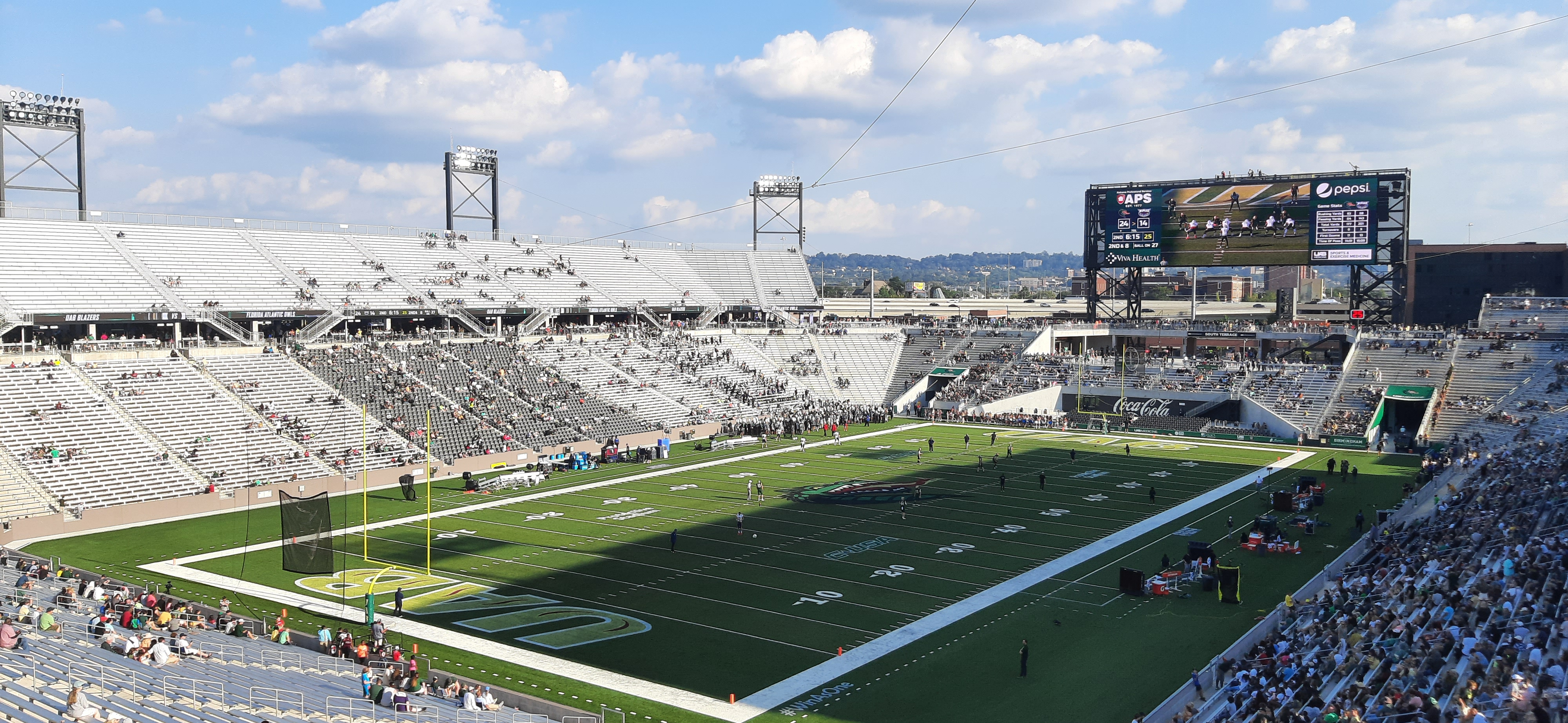
Protective Stadium

- In 2019, Birmingham became home to the Birmingham Legion FC, a professional soccer team that competes in the USL Championship and plays its home matches at Protective Stadium.
- In 2021, the NBA G League introduced the Birmingham Squadron, a minor league basketball team affiliated with the NBA's New Orleans Pelicans.

Legion Field

- The United Football League features 8 teams, including the Birmingham Stallions, and also played its inaugural season in Birmingham from April to June 2022 at Protective Stadium and Legion Field. The Birmingham Stallions posted a 9–1 record in its inaugural season, and defeated the Philadelphia Stars on July 3, 2022, at the Tom Benson Hall of Fame Stadium in Canton, Ohio to win the 2022 USFL Championship.
- In NCAA sports, Birmingham is home to the University of Alabama at Birmingham (UAB Blazers) and Samford University (Samford Bulldogs) Division I athletic programs. Birmingham has hosted several college football postseason bowl games, including the Dixie Bowl (1948–49), the Hall of Fame Classic (1977–85), the All-American Bowl (1986–90), the SEC Championship Game (1992–93), the SWAC Championship Game (1999–2012), the Birmingham Bowl, and the Magic City Classic. Additionally, the Hoover Metropolitan Stadium is home to the Southeastern Conference Baseball Tournament. The Southeastern Conference, Southwestern Athletic Conference and Gulf South Conference are headquartered in Birmingham.
- Birmingham was home to the Black Barons, a very successful Negro League team. The Black Barons played home games at Rickwood Field, which is still standing in the Rising-West Princeton neighborhood, and it is the oldest baseball field in the US.
- In 1996, Legion Field hosted early rounds of Olympic soccer where it drew record crowds. The field has also hosted men's and women's World Cup qualifiers and friendlies. A switch from natural grass to an artificial surface has left the stadium's role as a soccer venue in doubt.
- Motorsports are very popular in the Birmingham area and across the state, and the area is home to numerous annual motorsport races. The Aaron's 499 and AMP Energy 500 are NASCAR Sprint Cup races that occur in April and October at the Talladega Superspeedway. The Indy Grand Prix of Alabama shares the Barber Motorsports Park road course with Superbike and sports car GrandAm races.
- The PGA Champions Tour has had a regular stop in the Birmingham area since 1992, with the founding of the Bruno's Memorial Classic, later renamed the Regions Charity Classic. In 2011 the tournament will be replaced by The Tradition, one of the Champions Tour's five "major" tour events.
- Birmingham has been selected to host the World Games in 2021. Due to the COVID-19 pandemic, the World Games was delayed and held in 2022 from July 7–17. It was the first time that an American city has hosted the event since the inaugural games were held in Santa Clara, California in 1981.
- Recreational fishing is also immensely popular in the Birmingham area. Fish have been caught in 14 separate Alabama lakes which would be state records in 35 other states. Recently, Birmingham was named "Bass Capital of the World" by ESPN and Bassmaster magazine. Over the last several years, Birmingham has been home to numerous major fishing tournaments, including the Bass Masters Classic. Some of the more popular recreational lakes around Birmingham include: Smith Lake, Lay Lake, Lake Neely Henry, Lake Logan Martin, Lake Purdy, and Bankhead Reservoir.
- The U.S. Paralympic Training Facility is located in Birmingham and was a primary filming location for the 2005 documentary film Murderball, about wheelchair rugby players.
- Road running events such as the Vulcan 10K Run and Mercedes Marathon/Half Marathon are popular for both locals and out-of-state runners.
- Cycling (both mountain biking and road) is popular in the area. Nearby Oak Mountain State Park annually hosts the Bump N' Grind mountain bike (1995–present) race and the Xterra Southeast Championship triathlon as well as other endurance competitions.
- Birmingham was home to a World Hockey Association franchise, the Birmingham Bulls, between 1975 and 1979, and then between 1979 and 1981 in the Central Hockey League.

=== Venues ===
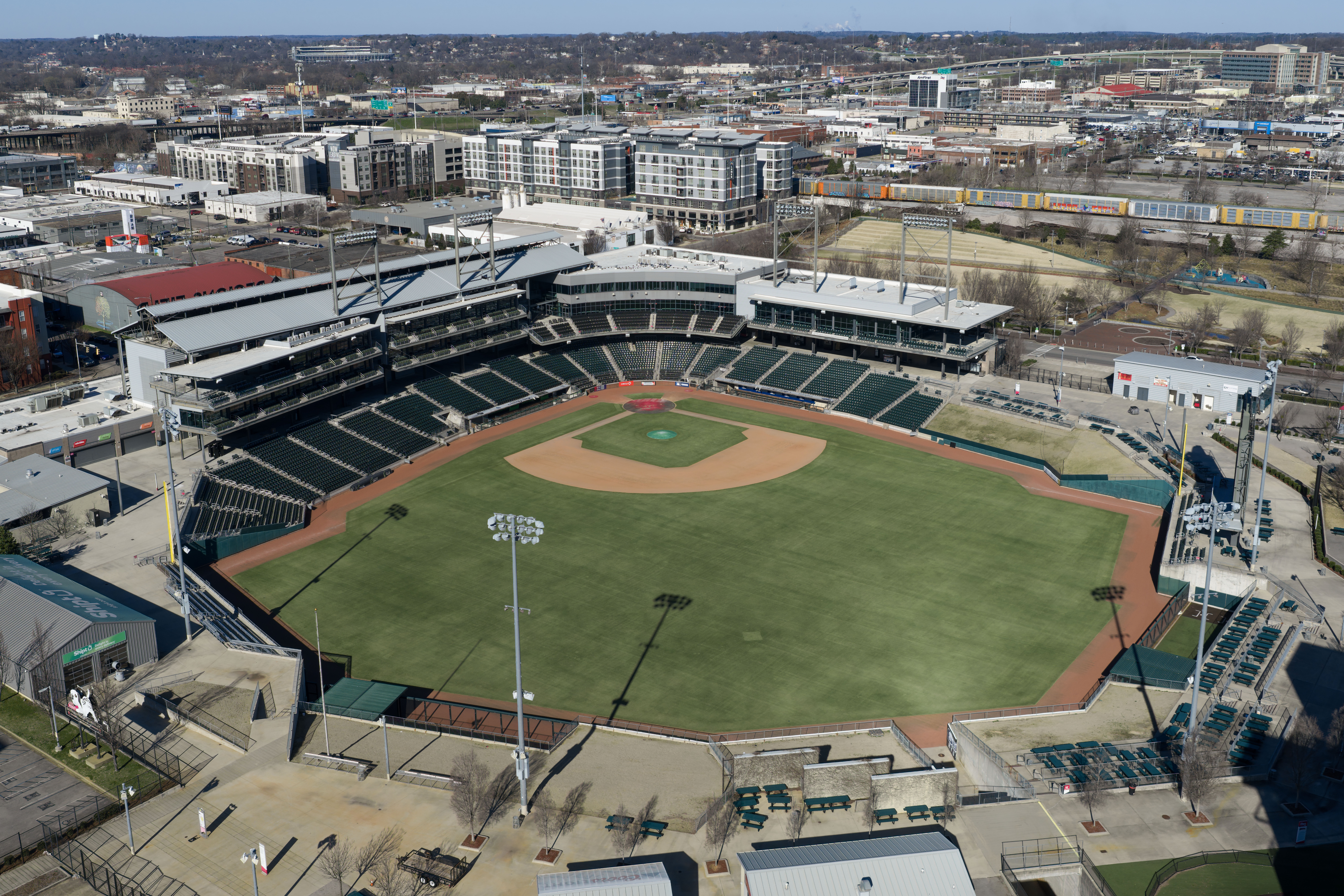
Regions Field is the home to the Birmingham Barons baseball team

- Bartow Arena
- Boutwell Auditorium
- Fair Park Arena
- Hoover Metropolitan Stadium
- Legacy Arena
- Legion Field
- Pelham Civic Center
- PNC Field
- Protective Stadium
- Regions Field
- Rickwood Field

== Government ==
Current city council membership
District	Representative	Position
1	Clinton Woods	
2	Hunter Williams	
3	Valerie Abbott	
4	J. T. Moore	
5	Darrell O'Quinn	
6	Crystal Smitherman	President Pro-Tem
7	Wardine Alexander	President
8	Carol Clarke	
9	LaTonya Tate	

Birmingham has a strong-mayor variant mayor-council form of government, led by a mayor and a nine-member city council. The current system replaced the previous city commission government in 1962 (primarily as a way to remove Commissioner of Public Safety Eugene "Bull" Connor from power).

By Alabama law, an issue before a city council must be approved by a two-thirds majority vote (Act No. 452, Ala. Acts 1955, as supplemented by Act No. 294, Ala. Acts 1965). Executive powers are held entirely by the Mayor's Office. Birmingham's current mayor is Randall Woodfin. Mayor Bell, who previously served as interim Mayor in 1999, won a special election on January 19, 2010, to fill the unexpired term of former Mayor Larry Langford. Langford was removed from office after being convicted of federal corruption charges on October 28, 2009.

In 1974, Birmingham established a structured network of neighborhood associations and community advisory committees to insure public participation in governmental issues that affect neighborhoods. Neighborhood associations are routinely consulted on matters related to zoning changes, liquor licenses, economic development, policing and other city services. Neighborhoods are also granted discretionary funds from the city's budget to use for capital improvements. Each neighborhood's officers meet with their peers to form Community Advisory Committees which are granted broader powers over city departments. The presidents of these committees, in turn, form the Citizen's advisory board, which meets regularly with the mayor, council, and department heads. Birmingham is divided into a total of 23 communities, and again into a total of 99 individual neighborhoods with individual neighborhood associations.

=== State and federal representation ===
The United States Postal Service operates post offices in Birmingham. The main post office is located at 351 24th Street North in Downtown Birmingham. Birmingham is also the home of the Social Security Administration's Southeastern Program Service Center. This center is one of only seven in the United States that process Social Security entitlement claims and payments. In addition, Birmingham is the home of a branch bank of the Atlanta Federal Reserve Bank.

=== Crime ===
Birmingham has a crime rate significantly above the national average. Increasing gang violence and activity have been noted for the spike in crime around the city. In 2022, Birmingham set a modern record with 144 homicides. According to a 2023 study, Birmingham leads the nation's largest cities with the highest cost of crime per capita at $11,392. Its violent crime rate – which includes instances of murder, manslaughter, rape, robbery and aggravated assault – was 1,682 per 100,000 residents. Its property crime rate – which includes burglary, larceny, and vehicle theft – was notably higher at 4,173 per 100,000 residents. Also in 2023, Forbes ranked Birmingham the second most dangerous city in the United States. In October 2024, Mayor Woodfin established the Birmingham Crime Commission to better redress the escalating crime crises in the city. In 2024, Birmingham set a new all-time high murder record with 151 murders in the city.

The downtown district is patrolled by City Action Partnership (CAP), formed in 1995 to increase public perception of safety.

== Education ==
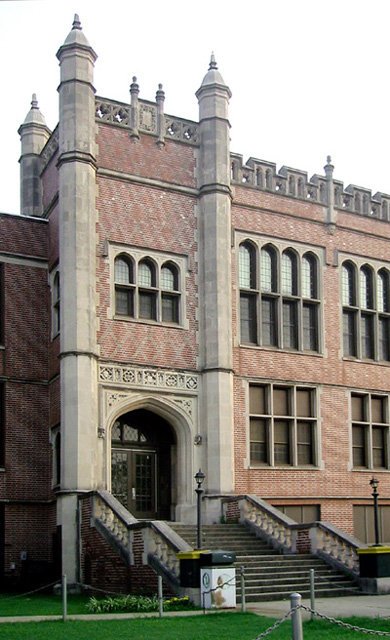
Woodlawn High School, a magnet high school

The Birmingham Public Library administers 21 branches throughout the city and it is part of a wider system including another 19 suburban branches in Jefferson County, serving the entire community to provide education and entertainment for all ages.

The city of Birmingham is served by the Birmingham City Schools system. It is run by the Birmingham Board of Education with a current active enrollment of 30,500 in 62 schools: seven high schools, 13 middle schools, 33 elementary schools, and nine kindergarten-eighth-grade primary schools.

The greater-Birmingham metropolitan area is the home of numerous independent school systems, because there has a been a great deal of fragmentation of educational systems in Alabama, and especially in Jefferson County. Some of these "school systems" only have three to five schools. The metropolitan area's three largest school systems are the Jefferson County School System, Birmingham City Schools, and the Shelby County School System. However, there are many smaller school systems.

The metro area also has three preparatory schools: Saint Rose Academy located in Birmingham proper The Altamont School, also located in Birmingham proper, and Indian Springs School in north Shelby County near Pelham.

Noteworthy institutions of higher education in greater Birmingham include the University of Alabama at Birmingham, Samford University (includes the Cumberland School of Law), Birmingham School of Law, Miles College, the independent Miles Law School, Jefferson State Community College, University of Montevallo (in Shelby County), Lawson State Community College, and Virginia College. Birmingham-Southern College, opened in 1856, closed in May 2024 due to financial troubles. In 2026, the US Coast Guard opened a training center at the campus of the former Birmingham-Southern College.

== Media ==
Birmingham does not have a major print newspaper since The Birmingham News ceased its print edition in 2023. The newspaper has been awarded two Pulitzer Prizes, in 1991 and 2007. The Birmingham Post-Herald, the city's second daily, published its last issue in 2005. Other local publications include The North Jefferson News, The Leeds News, The Trussville Tribune (Trussville, Clay and Pinson), The Western Star (Bessemer) and The Western Tribune (Bessemer).

The Birmingham Times, a historic African-American newspaper, also is published weekly. Birmingham is served by the city magazine of the Chamber of Commerce, Birmingham magazine. The Alabama Baptist, published weekly in Birmingham, is an entity of the Alabama Baptist Convention. Black & White, Weld, Birmingham Weekly, and the Birmingham Free Press are some of the free alternative publications that were published in the past (all are now defunct).

Birmingham is part of the Birmingham–Tuscaloosa–Anniston television market. The major television affiliates, most of which have their transmitters and studios located on Red Mountain in Birmingham, are WBRC 6 (Fox), WBIQ 10 (PBS), WVTM 13 (NBC, with CBS on DT4), WTTO 21 (Independent), WIAT 42 (The CW), WPXH 44 (Ion Television), WBMA-LD 58/68.2 (ABC), and WABM 68 (MyNetworkTV).

Major broadcasting companies who own stations in the Birmingham market include iHeartMedia, Cox Radio, Cumulus Media, and Crawford Broadcasting. The Rick and Bubba show, which is syndicated to over 25 stations primarily in the Southeast, originates from Birmingham's WZZK-FM. The Paul Finebaum sports-talk show, also syndicated and carried nationwide on Sirius digital radio, originated from WJOX.

Birmingham is home to EWTN (Eternal Word Television Network), the world's largest Catholic media outlet and religious media network of any kind, broadcasting to about 350 million television households in more than 145 countries and territories, as of 2022.

== Infrastructure ==
=== Urban planning in Birmingham ===
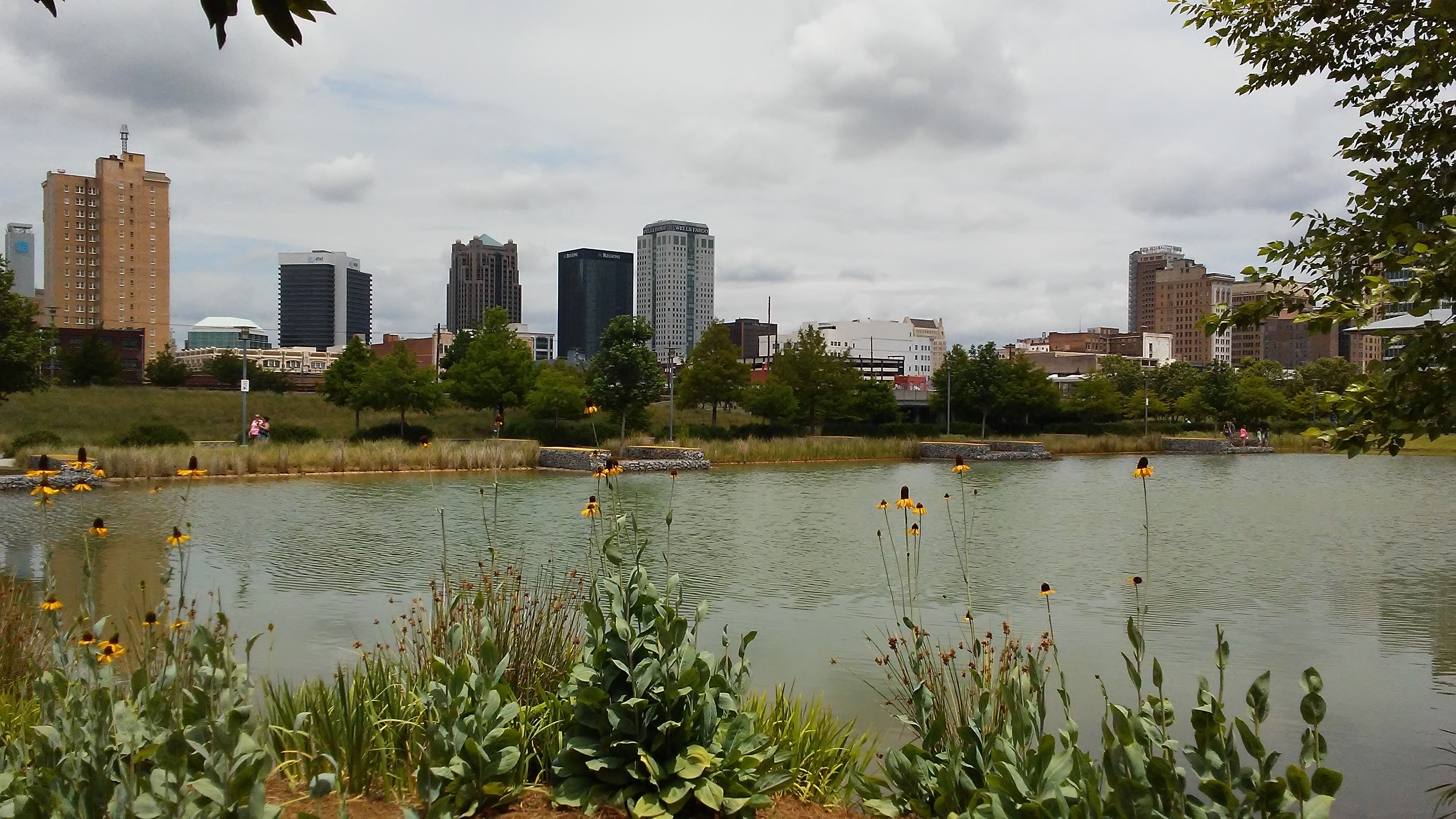
Birmingham Railroad Park

Before the first structure was built in Birmingham, the plan of the city was laid out over a total of 1,160 acres (4.7 km^{2}) by the directors of the Elyton Land Co. The streets were numbered from west to east, leaving Twentieth Street to form the central spine of downtown, anchored on the north by Capital Park and stretching into the slopes of Red Mountain to the south. A "railroad reservation" was granted through the center of the city, running east to west and zoned solely for industrial uses. As the city grew, bridges and underpasses separated the streets from the railroad bed, lending this central reservation some of the impact of a river (without the pleasant associations of a waterfront). From the start, Birmingham's streets and avenues were unusually wide at 80 to 100 feet (24 to 30 m), purportedly to help evacuate unhealthy smoke.

In the early 20th century professional planners helped lay out many of the new industrial settlements and company towns in the Birmingham District, including Corey (now Fairfield) which was developed for the Tennessee Coal, Iron and Railroad Company (subsequently purchased by U.S. Steel). At the same time, a movement to consolidate several neighboring cities gained momentum. Although local referendums indicated mixed feelings about annexation, the Alabama legislature enacted an expansion of Birmingham's corporate limits that became effective on January 1, 1910.

The Robert Jemison company developed many residential neighborhoods to the south and west of Birmingham which are still renowned for their aesthetic quality.

A 1924 plan for a system of parks, commissioned from the Olmsted Brothers is seeing renewed interest with several significant new parks and greenways under development. Birmingham officials have approved a City Center Master Plan developed by Urban Design Associates of Pittsburgh, which advocates strongly for more residential development in the downtown area. The plan also called for a major park over several blocks of the central railroad reservation: Railroad Park, which opened in 2010. Along with Ruffner Mountain Park and Red Mountain Park, Birmingham ranks first in the United States for public green space per resident.

=== Utilities ===
The water for Birmingham and the intermediate urbanized area is served by the Birmingham Water Works Board (BWWB). A public authority that was established in 1951, the BWWB serves all of Jefferson, northern Shelby, western St. Clair counties. The largest reservoir for BWWB is Lake Purdy, which is located on the Jefferson and Shelby County line, but has several other reservoirs including Bayview Lake in western Jefferson County. There are plans to pipeline water from Inland Lake in Blount County and Lake Logan Martin, but those plans are on hold indefinitely.

Jefferson County Environmental Services serves the Birmingham metro area with sanitary sewer service. Sewer rates have increased in recent years after citizens concerned with pollution in area waterways filed a lawsuit that resulted in a federal consent decree to repair an aging sewer system. Because the estimated cost of the consent decree was approximately three times more than the original estimate, many blame the increased rates on corruption of several Jefferson County officials. The sewer construction and bond-swap agreements continue to be a controversial topic in the area.

Electric power is provided primarily by Southern Company-subsidiary, Alabama Power. However, some of the surrounding area such as Bessemer and Cullman are provided by TVA. Bessemer also operates its own water and sewer system. Natural gas is provided by Spire, although some metro area cities operate their own natural gas services. The local telecommunications are provided by AT&T. Cable television service is provided by Charter Communications.

== Transportation ==
=== Highways ===
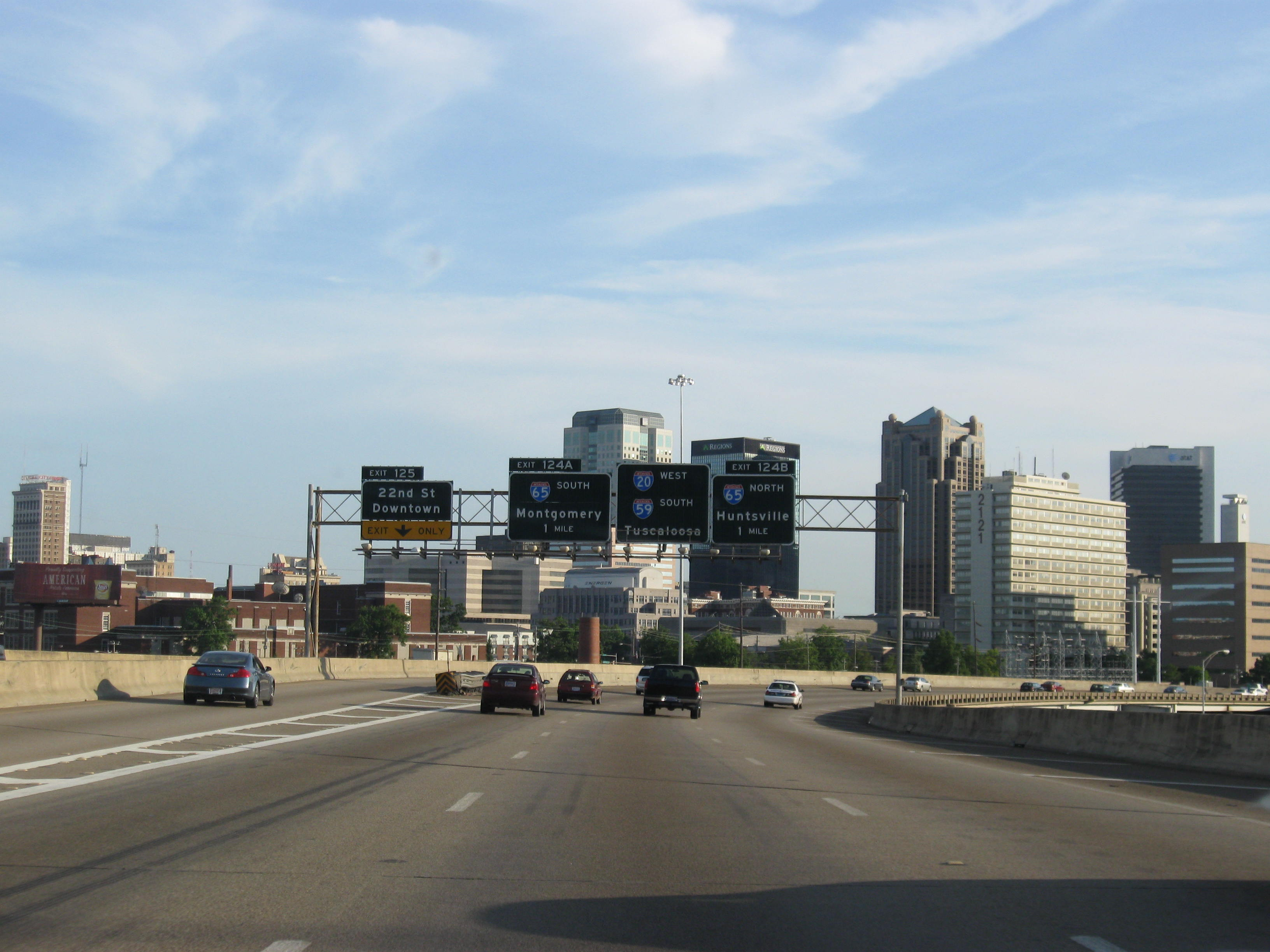
Interstate 59 (co-signed with Interstate 20) approaching Interstate 65 in downtown Birmingham

The city is served by four Interstate Highways, Interstate 20, Interstate 65, Interstate 59, and Interstate 22, as well as a southern bypass expressway Interstate 459, which connects with I-20/59 to the southwest, I-65 to the south, I-20 to the east, and I-59 to the northeast. Beginning in downtown Birmingham is the "Elton B. Stephens Expressway"—the Red Mountain Expressway to the southeast—which carries both U.S. Highway 31 and U.S. Highway 280 to, through, and over Red Mountain. Interstate 22 was completed in 2012 and connects Birmingham and Memphis, Tennessee. I-22 connects with I-65 just north of the Birmingham city limits. Construction has begun on the first segment of I-422, the Birmingham Northern Beltline that will serve the suburbs on the opposite side of Birmingham from I-459.

=== Public transit ===
In the area of metropolitan public transportation, Birmingham is served by the Birmingham-Jefferson County Transit Authority (BJCTA) bus, trolley, and paratransit system, which from 1985 until 2008 was branded the Metro Area Express (MAX). BJCTA also operates a "downtown circulator" service called "D A R T" (Downtown Area Runabout Transit), which consists of two routes in the central business district and one in the UAB area.

A bus rapid transit line, named the Birmingham Xpress, was opened in September 2022, running from Woodlawn to Five Points West along the US 11 corridor. Bus service to other cities is provided by Greyhound Lines. Megabus also offers bus service to Atlanta and Memphis.

=== Air ===
Birmingham is served by the Birmingham–Shuttlesworth International Airport. This airport serves more than 3 million passengers every year. With more than 160 flights daily, the airport offers flights to 37 cities across the United States. Commercial passenger service through Birmingham is provided by United Express, Delta Air Lines/Delta Connection, American Eagle, and Southwest Airlines.

=== Rail ===
==== Passenger ====
Birmingham was a railroad hub from its founding, and its Beaux-Arts Terminal Station was a major passenger stop for many trains crossing the Southeast until the creation of Amtrak on May 1, 1971, when all but one of Birmingham's passenger trains were eliminated. The only remaining passenger service is the Amtrak Crescent, with one train eastbound and one train westbound daily from the Birmingham Amtrak station. The Crescent route connects Birmingham with Washington, D.C., and points northeast and northwest of there; Greensboro, NC; Charlotte, NC; Greenville, SC; Atlanta, GA; Anniston, AL; Tuscaloosa, AL; Meridian, MS; Hattiesburg, MS; and New Orleans, LA.

Another Amtrak train, the Floridian, served Birmingham en route from Chicago to Florida points from November 1971 to October 1979, when it was cancelled for low ridership. From May 1974 to September 1977, the Auto-Train Corporation operated its eponymous train via Birmingham on its Louisville, Kentucky to Sanford, Florida route. However, Birmingham was not a passenger stop for the Auto-Train, merely a crew-change point. The Auto-Train Corporation went out of business in 1981, but since 1983, Amtrak has operated another Auto Train (no hyphen) between Lorton, Virginia, and Sanford; it does not enter Alabama.

Beginning in October 1989, Amtrak's Gulf Breeze was a section of the Crescent that split from the Crescent at Birmingham and ran to Mobile, stopping at several intermediate points. The state of Alabama shared the operating costs with Amtrak; however, due to dismally low ridership, the Gulf Breeze was discontinued in April 1995.

==== Freight ====
Birmingham is served by three major freight railroad companies, the Norfolk Southern Company, CSX Transportation, and BNSF Railway, all of which have major railroad yards in the metro area. Smaller regional railroads such as the Alabama Warrior Railway and the Birmingham Southern Railroad also serve customers in Birmingham.

== Sister cities ==
Birmingham's Sister Cities program is overseen by the Birmingham Sister Cities Commission.

- Hitachi, Japan since April 23, 1982
- Székesfehérvár, Hungary since July 15, 1994
- Anshan, China since November 5, 1996
- Chaoyang District, Beijing, China (Friendship City) since August 5, 1998
- Krasnodon, Ukraine (Friendship City) since April 8, 1999
- Vinnytsia, Ukraine since April 23, 2003
- Plzeň, Czech Republic since May 6, 2005
- Guédiawaye, Senegal since February 8, 2005
- Al-Karak, Jordan since November 9, 2005
- Rosh HaAyin, Israel since November 9, 2005
- Winneba, Ghana since February 2, 2009
- Liverpool, United Kingdom since October 21, 2015
- Kingston, Jamaica since February 15, 2017
- Maebashi, Japan since July 3, 2017
- Apaaso, Ghana since September 29, 2017
- Wales, United Kingdom (friendship) since September 15, 2023

== See also ==
- List of U.S. cities with large Black populations
- List of U.S. communities with African-American majority populations in 2020
- USS Birmingham, 3 ships
