= EBSCO Industries =

American conglomerate, founded 1944

EBSCO Industries, Inc.
- Type: Private
- Industry: Conglomerate
- Founded: 1944; 82 years ago
- Headquarters: Birmingham, Alabama, US
- Key people: Brys Stephens (Chairman); Bryson Stephens (CEO)
- Products: EBSCOhost
- Revenue: ▲US$3.1 billion (2023)
- Number of employees: 4,500 (2026)
- Website: ebscoind.com

EBSCO Industries is an American company founded in 1944 by Elton Bryson Stephens Sr. and headquartered in Birmingham, Alabama. The "EBSCO" acronym is based on Elton Bryson Stephens Company. EBSCO Industries is a diverse company of over 40 businesses engaged in activities including information services (EBSCO Information Services), outdoor products, manufacturing, general services, publishing services, and real estate.

EBSCO is one of the largest privately held companies in Alabama, and one of the top 200 in the U.S., based on revenues and employee numbers, according to Forbes Magazine.

== History ==
EBSCO was co-founded by Elton Bryson Stephens Sr. and his wife Alys Robinson Stephens in 1944 to sell magazine subscriptions, personalized binders and magazine racks to the U.S. Armed Forces. They named this "Military Service Company", and over the next decade acquired several other companies that were eventually combined to form EBSCO Industries Inc.

In 2011, EBSCO Publishing took over H. W. Wilson Company.
