= Wenonah, Alabama =

The Wenonah community (formerly Fossil) was the name of one of a series of Red Mountain ore mining camps for employees of the Tennessee Coal and Iron Company (TCI).

== Name ==
The name was chosen by TCI's social science director Marion Whidden as a complement to the company's Ishkooda and Muscoda camps. All three names appear in Henry Wadsworth Longfellow's epic poem "The Song of Hiawatha". The TCI camps were designated from west to east as: Muscoda Division Camp - mines #1, #2, #3, #4, #5, #6, Wenonah Division Camp ( originally referred to as the TCI Fossil Division ) mines #6½ #7, #8, #9, #10 and the Ishkooda Division Camp - mines #11, #12, #13, #14, #15.

== History ==
The oldest TCI mine was in the Ishkooda camp #13, which opened in 1873 as part the Eureka Company Mines and was called Eureka #2 mine. The oldest Wenonah Camps were #7 and #10 where the mines opened in 1880, known then as the Alice mine - #7 and Redding mine - #10. Mine #6½, which opened in 1910 and other mines were listed on the 1916 Birmingham Mining District maps. Wenonah Number 6½ was next to the Woodward Iron Company's Red Ore camp mine #2, which was on the #6½ western boundary, and also near here was the location of the water reservoir that in about 1947 was replaced with a covered water tank, now owned by the Bessemer Water Works. The reservoir/tank is located in the Lipscomb area of Jefferson County.

By 1900, TCI was operating 15 iron ore mines in the Birmingham District including the Wenonah #7, and #8 mining camps. In 1880, before TCI became the owner, the #7 mine was operated by T.T. Hillman and Henry DeBardeleben's Alice Furnace Company. The #7 mine in those days was called the Alice Mine and also sometimes referred to as the Hillman Mine. The Wenonah #8 mine, opened in 1887, was originally the Fossil Mine and was operated by the Smith Mining Company. Wenonah Mining Camp #7, later in 1940, became the site of the sintering plant that processed the iron ore before being transported via The High Line Railroad connection from Red Mountain to the Fairfield Works. The Highline was constructed in 1925. In 1914, TCI began ongoing facilities and programs to improve lives of employees with schools (Wenonah School), hospitals (Lloyd Noland Hospital), training programs and housing.

== Camp locations ==
The oldest was Wenonah Camp #7 (circa 1880) as listed on the 1916 Birmingham Mining District maps. Number 6 1/2 was next to the Woodward Iron Company's camp #2 on its western boundary and was the location of the water reservoir that in about 1947 was replaced with a covered water tank, now owned by the Bessemer Water Works. The reservoir/tank is located in the Lipscomb area of Jefferson County.

Wenonah Mining Camp #7 (1880-1938), located on the southwest boundary of Browns Station, was also the site of the plant that processed the iron ore before being transported via High Ore Line Railroad connection from Red Mountain to the Fairfield Works.

Wenonah Camp #8 (1887-1938), was located just south of Hillman on the north side of Red Mountain, and is sometimes referred to as "New Hill". It was also the site of the company commissary, doctor's office and other administrative offices.

Wenonah camp #9 was south of Grasselli Heights on the north side of Red Mountain. It was the location of the Wenonah School, built in 1917 on the current East Brownsville Park site, as part of the program to improve lives of employees. The #9 mine was opened in 1897 under contract to the Smith Mining Company and then was known as the Klondike mine.

Wenonah Camp #10 (1880-1952), was located adjacent to West Goldwire and south of the current Wenonah High School. It is now known as Tarpley City.

== Mine closures ==
In 1962, the TCI - US Steel Red Mountain ore mines closed in Birmingham District as material and labor cost begin to increase. Due to a higher grade, the ore in Venezuela began to be used. The last Iron Ore mine to close in the Birmingham district was the Woodward Company #4 (Pyne)mine, The Pyne Mine which was located just south of Bessemer, Muscoda and Readers Gap. The Pyne Mine closed in 1971.
