= Matt Carlisle =

American baseball player (1910-1972)

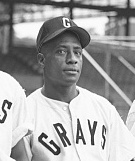
- Second baseman
- Born: February 5, 1910; Wenonah, Alabama, U.S.
- Died: November 18, 1972 (aged 62); Pittsburgh, Pennsylvania, U.S.
- Batted: Right Threw: Right

Negro league baseball debut
- 1931, for the Birmingham Black Barons

Last appearance
- 1948, for the New York Cubans
- Stats at Baseball Reference

Teams
- Birmingham Black Barons (1931); Montgomery Grey Sox (1932); Memphis Red Sox (1933); Birmingham Black Barons (1934); Homestead Grays (1935–38, 1940–44, 1946); New York Cubans (1948)

Matthew Carlisle (February 5, 1910 – November 18, 1972), nicknamed "Lick", was an American professional baseball infielder who played in the Negro leagues. He spent the majority of his career with the Homestead Grays.

Carlisle was born in Wenonah, Alabama; as an adult, he worked as a coal miner. In 1931, he played as the starting shortstop for the Birmingham Black Barons of the Negro leagues, batting .268 for his rookie season. The following year, Carlisle signed with the Montgomery Gray Sox, and had stints with teams active in Memphis and New Orleans in 1934.

In 1935, Carlisle signed with the Homestead Grays, situated as the team's starting second baseman. Hitting .379 on the season, he was nonetheless better known for his defensive capabilities on the field and as a legitimate base stealing threat on the basepaths. Oftentimes, Carlisle hit second in the line-up, in front of teammates Josh Gibson and Buck Leonard. His struggles in 1938, however, after posting just a .139 batting average (BA), precipitated the loss of Carlisle's starting role to Sammy Bankhead in 1939.

A year later, Carlisle was reinserted as a starter, batting .278. With the Grays, he won the 1943 Negro World Series but went 0-for-9 during the series. Carlisle served in the US Navy during World War II, and spent the remainder of his baseball career as a utility man before retiring in 1946.

Carlisle died in Pittsburgh, Pennsylvania in 1972; he was 62 years old.
