= Flintridge Building =

- U.S. National Register of Historic Places
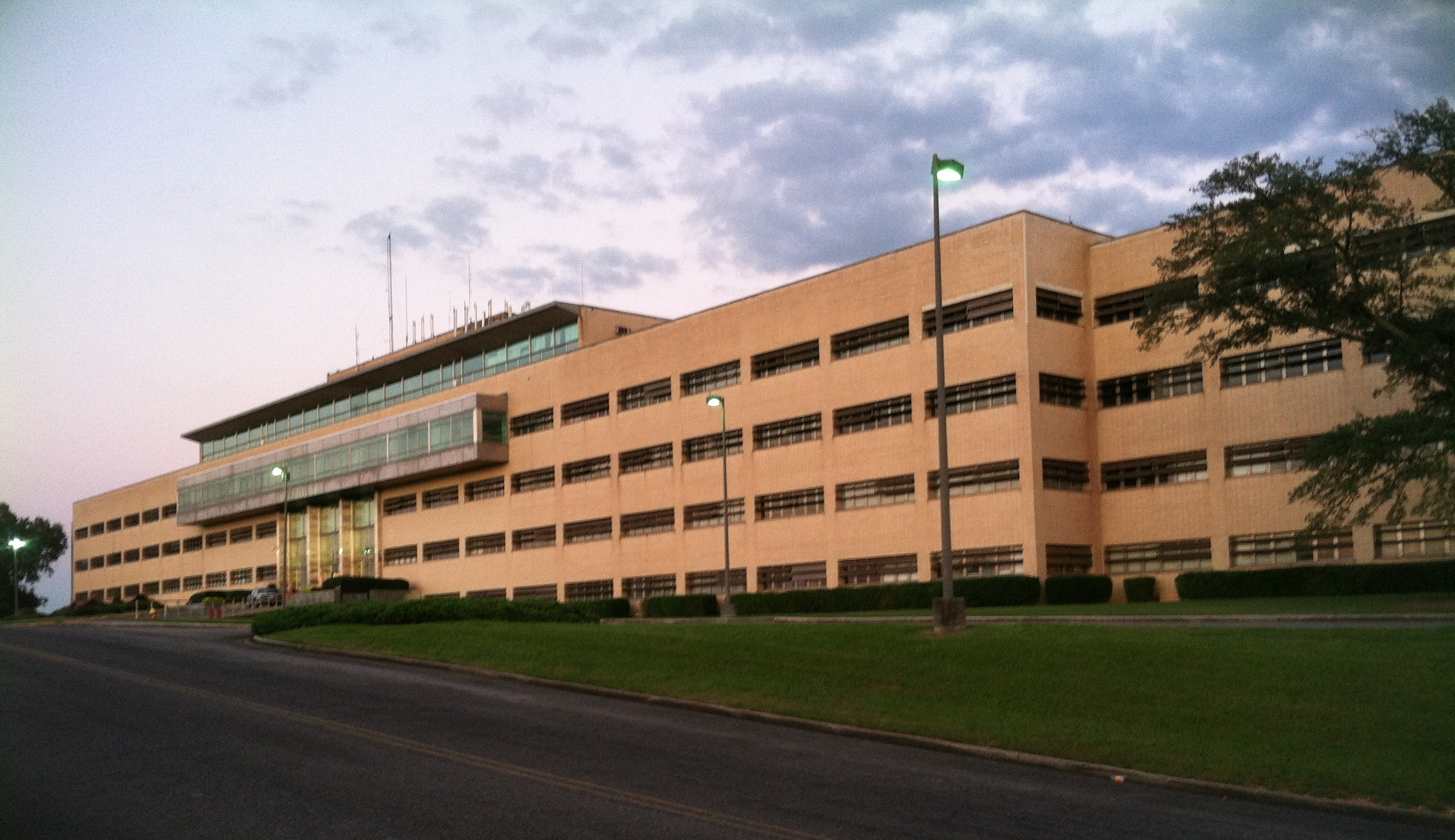
- The Tennessee Coal & Iron Company Flint Ridge Building

- Location within Alabama Location within the United States
- Location: 6200 E. J. Oliver Blvd., Fairfield, Alabama
- Coordinates: 33.47641°N 86.91964°W
- Area: 20 acres (8.1 ha)
- Built: 1951
- Architect: Jack B. Smith (Holabird, Root & Burgee)
- Architectural style: Modern Movement
- NRHP reference No.: 04000560
- Added to NRHP: June 2, 2004

The Flintridge Building (formerly the Flint Ridge Building) is a historic office building in Fairfield, Alabama, in metropolitan Birmingham. From 1951 to 1964 it served as the headquarters of the southern division of United States Steel and housed nearly 1,500 employees. In 2004 the building was added to the National Register of Historic Places.

Sited on a ridge on E.J. Oliver Boulevard near Miles College, the building overlooks the Fairfield Works. The front facade of the building features projecting, glass-enclosed rooms resembling stadium pressboxes, which provide a view of the ironworks.

== History ==
The building was developed in 1951 to serve as the new headquarters of the Tennessee Coal, Iron & Railroad Company (TCI), a wholly owned subsidiary of U.S. Steel. It was designed by Jack B. Smith of the Chicago firm of Holabird, Root & Burgee. Upon completion, TCI relocated its offices from the Brown Marx Building in downtown Birmingham to the Flint Ridge Building.

In 1964 U.S. Steel moved most of its executive staff to Pittsburgh, Pennsylvania, changing the character of the building. U.S. Steel eventually offered the five-story, 314,000-square-foot building to the Fairfield city government for a nominal price, but the offer was not taken. Former mayor Larry Langford did propose that the building be converted to a municipal office building that would be encircled by a monorail, but nothing came of the idea.

Besides leasing office space to local businesses, in 2006 U.S. Steel opened a maintenance training center in the Flintridge Building. In 2011 the city council considered acquiring the building for use by the local school system.

== See also ==
- Birmingham District
