= James Pickering Dovel =

American author and inventor

James Pickering Dovel (26 December 1868 – 30 July 1948) was an author and inventor who researched and improved blast furnace operations. In 1940 he received the Modern Pioneer Award from the National Association of Manufacturers in honor of his "distinguished achievement in the field of science and invention."

Born in 1868 in Pickerington, Ohio, he spent his early years running a farm for his invalid father. He invented a mechanical corn harvester at the age of seventeen, after realizing the need for labor-saving machinery on the farm. While the device was never patented, it was adopted by several manufacturers of farm equipment.

The depression of the 1890s drove Dovel, his wife and children to the city, where he was hired at Columbus Steam and Boiler Company. Within days, he was promoted to foreman, launching a long career in industrial invention.

In 1905 Dovel moved to Birmingham to become superintendent of the Birmingham Engineering Company. While there, he supervised construction of a blast furnace for Woodward Iron Company. Four years later, he joined the Sloss Furnace Company as superintendent of construction.

For the next twenty-one years, Dovel developed gas cleaning equipment, modified the design of the furnaces, and improved the linings of the furnaces. In all, some seventeen patents are credited to Dovel. Sloss's No. 2 Furnace, rebuilt in 1927, included many of these inventions, earning Dovel and Sloss a national reputation for innovation. Arthritis confined Dovel to bed in 1933. During World War II, Dovel worked by telephone from his hospital bed, advising blast furnace operators around the country in the use of his many patented innovations. At the time of his death, more than fifty furnaces were using his inventions.
