= Woodward Iron Company =

The Woodward Iron Company (located in the area between Hueytown, Brighton, and Bessemer, Alabama) was founded on December 31, 1881, by brothers William and Joseph Woodward. William was the company president and Joseph was the company secretary. The company operated iron and coal mines, quarries and furnaces; these were connected by a private industrial railroad based in Bessemer, Alabama. The company administrative office was located near Woodward Ore Mine #1, south of Paul's Hill in Bessemer.

By the 1920s Woodward Iron was one of the nation's largest suppliers of pig iron. It was part of the industrial complex of heavy industries in the Birmingham and Bessemer area. The workforce eventually grew to more than 2000 men.

In 1968, Mead Corporation acquired Woodward Iron Company just as the nation's steel industry was about to begin restructuring and a long decline. By the mid 1970s the entire iron mining and manufacturing site closed down. Today much of the 1,200-acre (4.9 km^{2}) site has been cleared. Some has been abandoned and other areas have been re-developed for lighter industrial use. Little remains of the once sprawling plant except for an isolated chimney or two. However, three of the remaining arches from the high lines from the Woodward Iron Company can be found at 3551 Bessemer Super Highway, Bessemer, Alabama.

== Railroad ==
The industrial track operated by Woodward was on the "north" face of Red Mountain. The Woodward line came up the mountain, crossed under the Tennessee Coal, Iron and Railroad Company's railroad, and had an interchange track with it. The Woodward line, using a switchback configuration, was built along the face of Red Mountain and connecting to each of three mine sites. To the west of this location, is the Sloss #2 mine site, and to the east is the TCI/USX Wenonah #7 mine site and head of the High Line.

== Mines ==
The three Woodward ore mines were Woodward #1, #2 and #3. Woodward #1 was located south of Paul's Hill in Bessemer. A tailings dump was developed on the south side of the mountain, at the end of track at Woodward #1 site. In addition to administrative offices, this site also included doctors' offices, an elementary school (Red Ore), and the commissary. Woodward #2 was south of Lipscomb and west of TCI #6 1/2. Woodward #3 was south of Lipscomb, and was the last operational mining site on Red Mountain. Number three closed about 1953.

Woodward #3 Tipple, located on the northwest slope of Red Mountain, continued to be used to handle ore that was being hauled, by Euclid trucks, from the Woodward Songo Slope Mine two miles to the east. Songo was located between TCI's #10 and #11 Mines.

The company also operated the Pyne Mine, a vertical shaft mine, one of the most productive ore mines in the Birmingham District. It was located east of Red Mountain near the Lacey's Chapel community in Bessemer. In 1918, Woodward began construction of the vertical-shaft Pyne Mine, which reached iron ore about 1,200 feet (370 m) below ground. This mine was operated for a period of years, closed, and reopened for demand in World War II. It closed about 1972.

There were only two shaft mines for iron ore in the Birmingham District. They were both operated by Woodward. In addition to Pyne Mine, Woodward had a 384-foot-deep vertical shaft at its Songo slope mine. The Songo shaft mine operated from 1917 to 1927.

== Furnace ==
The Woodward blast furnaces were located in what was then called Woodward, Alabama, (an unincorporated area). It was between present-day Brighton and Dolomite, on the site of the plantation of Fleming Jordan, an early planter in Jefferson County. The Jordan plantation was located in present-day Hueytown, Alabama.

Furnace #1 went into operation on August 17, 1883, on the site of Mrs. Jordan's former rose garden. The ore was transported from the mines on Red Mountain, by rail through Lipscomb and Brighton to the Woodward Furnace. By 1909, there were three blast furnaces at this site, producing a daily output of 2,500 tons. As the steel industry declined in the early 1970s, the last blast furnace closed in 1973. Koppers Company purchased the remaining coke oven production plant and continued that operation for several additional years before it also closed.

== See also ==
- Allen Harvey Woodward
