= Sloss Mines =

Mines in Alabama, United States

Coordinates: 33.39816°N 86.93276°W

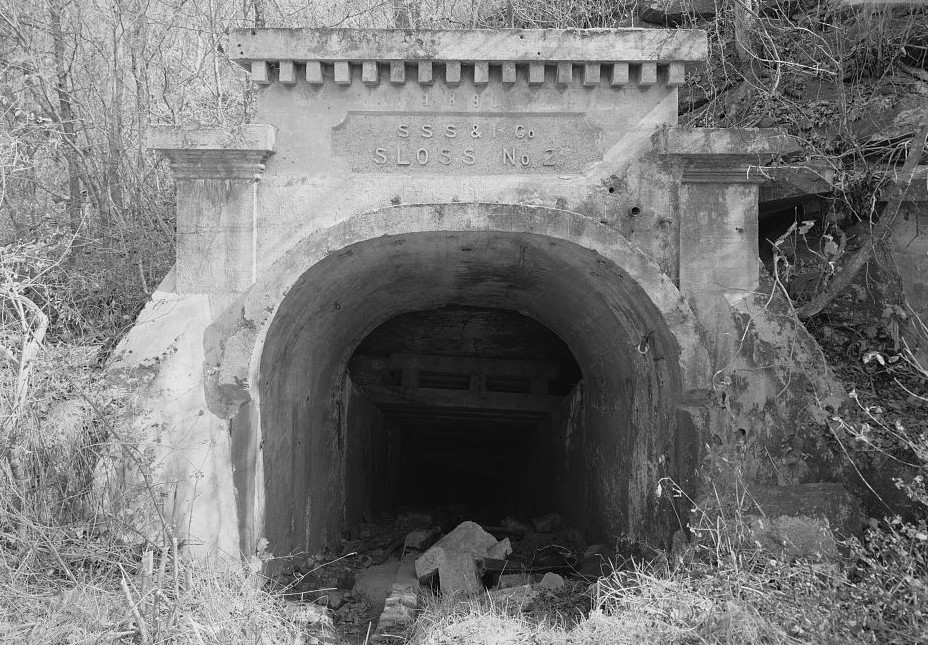
Historic American Engineering Record photo of the entrance portal to Sloss No. 2 in 1993. This particular mine was opened in 1890 and had reached a depth of 1,330 feet (410 m) by 1908.

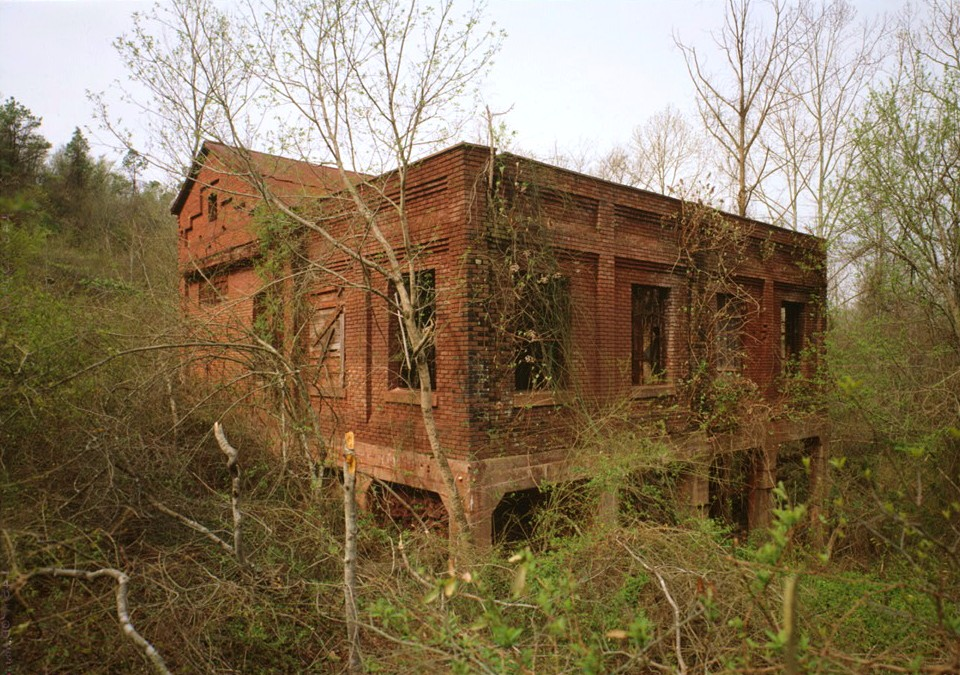
The abandoned hoist house for Sloss No. 2 in 1993. It remains largely intact.

The Sloss Mines are a group of mines in southwestern Jefferson County, Alabama, United States. They were established by the Sloss Iron and Steel Company and its successor, the Sloss-Sheffield Iron and Steel Company, at the southern end of Red Mountain. The Sloss Iron and Steel Company was founded by James Sloss in 1881 as the Sloss Furnace Company. The Sloss Mines produced iron ore from 1882 until the 1960s. The ore that these mines produced were essential to the production of iron at the Sloss Furnaces, making them an important element in the formation of adjacent Birmingham and Bessemer as cities.

An accident in January 1895 killed two people.

Red Mountain Park is an urban park that runs 4.5 miles (7.2 km) from east to west along the mountain. Red Mountain Park now owns the Sloss No. 2 mine site. Park officials plan to open a portion, but not all, of the area that the mines operated on to the public. Although the entrances have for the most part been sealed, The Tenn Coal and Iron mines 10, 11, 13 and 14, located in Red Mountain Park, are planned for development into interactive visitor sites. In addition, walking trails on the former mining sites have been developed, as well as the preservation of a mine worker's cemetery and many historic mining structures.

== See also ==
- Birmingham District
