= Allen Harvey Woodward =

Businessman

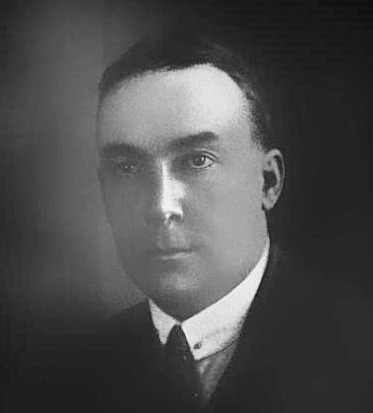
- Born: September 16, 1876; Wheeling, West Virginia, U.S.
- Died: November 23, 1950 (aged 74); Birmingham, Alabama, U.S.
- Occupation: Businessman

Allen Harvey "Rick" Woodward (September 16, 1876 – November 23, 1950) was an American businessman and baseball team owner.

Woodward began serving as the general superintendent of the Woodward Iron Company in 1899. Following his father's death, he became the company's president in 1918. Woodward also served on the board of several other companies in the southern United States. During World War I, Woodward served on the Pig Iron, Iron Ore, and Lake Transportation subcommittee of the War Industries Board.

Following his college baseball career at the University of the South, Woodward managed the Woodward Iron Company's baseball team. In 1909, he bought the Birmingham Barons, a local minor-league team in Birmingham, Alabama. His first initiative as owner was the construction of Rickwood Field in 1910. It was the first stadium constructed from steel and concrete in the southern United States and the first of its kind constructed for a minor league team.

== Early life ==
Woodward was born in Wheeling, West Virginia, on September 16, 1876, to Joseph Hersey Woodward and Martha Burt Metcalfe Woodward. In 1881, his father and uncle founded the Woodward Iron Company, based in Bessemer, Alabama. He attended the University of the South from 1892 to 1895, where he was a catcher for the school's baseball team. His father made him leave the school when his grades began to fall due to his focus on baseball. Woodward attended the Massachusetts Institute of Technology from 1896 to 1899, where he earned a degree in mining engineering. He also gained much business training by working with his father at the Woodward Iron Company.

== Career ==
Woodward served in practically every capacity connected with Woodward Iron Company. Woodward became general superintendent of the company in 1899, and president in 1918 (one year after his father's death). During the Atlanta, Birmingham and Atlantic Railway strike in 1921, to show that he had not forgotten his early training, he ran a locomotive on the company's rail for several days. His was the first train that moved over the entire line after the strike was declared. During World War I, Woodward Iron Company was important to the war effort, shipping thousands of tons of materials to the allies. During the war, Woodward served on the Pig Iron, Iron Ore, and Lake Transportation subcommittee of the War Industries Board.

Woodward also served as chairman of the board of the Woodward Iron Company; vice-chairman of Wheeling Steel Corporation (Wheeling, West Virginia); and director of the Wheeling Steel & Iron Company (Wheeling, West Virginia); Whitaker-Glessner Company (Wheeling, West Virginia); LaBelle Iron Works (Steubenville, Ohio); First National Bank (Birmingham, Alabama); Seaboard Air Line Railway; and Atlanta, Birmingham and Atlantic Railway.

== Baseball ==
Woodward was a keen baseball player, though he was unable to make a career out of this passion. After his college baseball career, he managed the Woodward Iron Company baseball team. He bought the Birmingham Barons, the local minor-league team, in late 1909. His first initiative as owner was the construction of Rickwood Field (which is named for him) in 1910. It was the first stadium constructed from steel and concrete in the southern United States or for any minor league team. For decades the field was the "crown jewel of southern baseball", and today it is the oldest baseball field in use in the United States.

Woodward was more involved than a typical owner, often practicing with the team and dressing in uniform. Rather than being content with throwing a ceremonial first pitch, he would sometimes insist on throwing the actual first pitch in his team's games. He also tousled with umpires and was closely involved with management, sometimes to the dismay of managers themselves. During Woodward's tenure as owner, the Birmingham Barons prospered. They finished first in the Southern Association five times, second three times, and third nine times; they also won the Dixie Series in 1929 and 1931. Under Woodward's ownership, more players from the Birmingham Barons went to the major leagues than from any other team. Financial hardship led Woodward to sell the team to automobile dealer Ed Norton in 1938.

Woodward also served as vice-president of the Birmingham Baseball Association and vice-president of the Southern Association of Baseball Clubs.

== Personal life and death ==
Woodward was a member of various social clubs. He supported Democrats locally and Republicans in national affairs. He married Annie Hill Jemison on November 1, 1904. They had five children: Eugenia, Marti, Ann, Joseph Harvey, and Allen Harvey, Jr.

Woodward died on Thanksgiving Day, November 23, 1950, at his home in Birmingham, Alabama.
