= Ruffner Mountain Nature Preserve =

Nature preserve in Alabama, US

- The Quarry at Ruffner Mountain

- Location within Alabama
- Location: Birmingham, Alabama
- Coordinates: 33°33′34.3722″N 86°42′26.6832″W
- Area: 1,038 acres (4 km^{2})
- Established: 1977
- Manager: Ruffner Mountain Nature Coalition, Inc.
- Website: ruffnermountain.org

Ruffner Mountain Nature Preserve is a 1,038 acres (4.20 km^{2}) nature preserve located in the eastern portion of Jefferson County, Alabama, in the City of Birmingham's historic South East Lake neighborhood. The preserve includes a visitor center containing native Alabama animals including raptors, snakes, turtles, and owls. The Ruffner Mountain area was home to iron ore mines and stone quarries, supplying the area's steel mills.

The preserve contains more than 14 miles (23 km) of hiking trails.

== History ==
In 1883, William Henry Ruffner, a professor at Roanoke College who had served as Virginia's first superintendent of public instruction and who had trained as geologist at Washington & Lee University, and John L. Campbell completed a survey for the Georgia Pacific Railway from Atlanta to the Mississippi River, including the Birmingham District.

It attracted the interest of Georgia Pacific directors in acquiring mineral lands and furnace works in the Birmingham District. In 1887, company president John W. Johnston acquired control of the Sloss Furnace Company, including its limestone quarry at Gate City and the soft ore mines that opened at Irondale that year. Daily output of the Irondale mines in 1887 was 135 tons.... After the turn of the century those mines were renamed Ruffner.... The mines closed June 1, 1953.... The Ruffner Mountain Nature Coalition, a nonprofit organization formed in 1977, presently leases 28 acres of the former mining site from the City of Birmingham. The land includes the abandoned limestone quarry in which the fossil remains of ancient sealife (bryozoans, brachipods and corals) are well-exposed. The old mining roads now serve as nature trails and the house at 1214 81st Street South on the northern slope of Red Mountain serves as headquarters for a nature center, wildlife reclamation activities and natural history exhibits.

— The Birmingham District: An Industrial History and Guide, Marjorie Longnecker White, 1981, Birmingham Historical Society

When the mines were finally shut down in the 1950s, nature reclaimed the area. 1977 marked the beginning of the Ruffner Mountain Nature Coalition, a nonprofit that leased 28 acres of land belonging to the City of Birmingham for protection and preservation. The Trust for Public Land added over 500 acres (2.0 km^{2}) to the preserve from 1983 to 1985, and an additional 400 acres (1.6 km^{2}) in 2000 under Alabama's Forever Wild program.

In 2010, construction was completed on RMNC's state-of-the-art LEED certified Treetop Visitor Center and Education Pavilion. The new 6,000-square-foot (560 m^{2}) nature center replaced the organization's old administrative office building, visitor center, and pavilion. The contractor, Stewart Perry, Inc., and architect, KPS Group, designed a building using sustainable architecture and materials ranging from a rainwater collection system to a myriad of recycled building materials and furnishings.
