= Pyne Mine =

Iron ore mine outside Bessemer, Alabama, U.S.

Coordinates: 33°22′33.18″N 86°55′21.65″W

The Pyne Mine was a vertical shaft iron ore mine operated by the Woodward Iron Company and located near the Lacey's Chapel community outside Bessemer, Alabama, in Shades Valley. It was, along with Woodward's Songo Mine, one of only two shaft mines dug in the Birmingham District, and the last ore mine to operate in the region, closing in 1971.

== Operation ==
Drilling began for the mine's 1,280 feet (390 m), concrete-lined vertical shaft in 1918 a few miles south of the Tennessee Coal, Iron and Railroad Company's Muscoda mines. The slope mines built near the ridge of Red Mountain were depleting the most accessible parts of the Clinton formation ore seams. Pyne was built over a "down dip" in the seam, beyond the lower extent of the Muscoda tunnels.

Operations ceased after only a few years of production due to the post-war drop in demand. The shaft was left to flood and the surface works closed down. With the renewed demands of World War II the mine was reopened in 1942.

A 1947 rock fall accident killed one miner.

== Equipment ==
A 163 feet (50 m) tall headframe was erected over the shaft to operate two hoists, one for ore skips and another for men and materials, riding in double-decker cages. The hoist cables were fed from massive cable-drum winches located inside two red brick hoist houses situated directly behind the headframe. Nearby was an ore-crushing and screening plant and a plant for pressing the crushed ore into briquettes (built in the 1950s, now demolished). The miners' bath house, designed to accommodate a work force of 500, contained a rack system so that clothes buckets could be suspended out of reach near the ceiling. Other surface works on the 5-acre (20,000 m^{2}) site included an electrical substation, a lamp house, a compressor house, a machine shop, tool shed, boiler house, pay house and office.

== Production ==
Despite emerging sources for imported ore, Pyne was one of the most productive ore mines in the Birmingham District, removing as much as 1 million tons of ore per year. Innovative mining methods, custom-designed equipment and an efficient surface layout kept the facility competitive. The ore was originally loaded onto trains on the Atlantic Coast Line Railroad for delivery to area iron and steel furnaces, but later was trucked to Woodward No. 3 Mine for loading. When the mine reached a thrust fault which would have required enormous efforts to overcome, the decision was made to cease operations. The pumps which kept the shaft from flooding were idled and the shaft itself was capped off.

== Road aggregate ==
After the mine was closed the site continued to be used for the production of road aggregate, made by crushing mine tailings from the site.

== See also ==
- Birmingham District
