= Red Mountain Park =

Urban park in Birmingham, Alabama

- Interactive map of Red Mountain Park
- Location: Birmingham, Alabama
- Coordinates: 33°26′43″N 86°51′44″W
- Area: 1,500 acres (610 ha)
- Opened: 2012
- Manager: Red Mountain Park Foundation
- Website: redmountainpark.org

Red Mountain Park is a 1,500-acre public urban park that encloses a 4.5-mile-long section of Red Mountain, a prominent ridge that passes through Birmingham, Alabama. The woodland park contains closed mines and other artifacts of the city's industrial history. The park is one of the largest urban parks in the United States - about 78% larger than Central Park in New York City.

== History ==
The park is located on land formerly owned by U.S. Steel and devoted to ore mines. The last mine closed in 1971.

Planning for a park on the site began by 2004. In 2005, the Freshwater Land Trust announced a campaign to raise funds to purchase and develop the park, and an organization called the Friends of Red Mountain Park was formed. The initial site was 1,200 acres in size.

In 2006, the Alabama Legislature designated the unfinished project as part of the Alabama state parks system and created the Red Mountain Greenway and Recreational Commission "to own, preserve, restore, maintain and promote the park." In 2007, the legislature designated the commission a state agency with exclusive control over the park and responsibility for its planning and development. The park's master plan received an award from the American Society of Landscape Architects in 2012.

The park opened to the public in 2012. By 2016, the park grew from 1,200 to 1,500 acres and added features including a 6-acre off-leash dog park.

Using automated traffic counting equipment, the park staff estimated that the park received about 11,000 visitors per month in 2015.

In 2015, the park briefly employed a herd of goats to help eliminate kudzu, Chinese privet (Ligustrum sinense), and other invasive plants.
