= Automotive Historic District =

- U.S. National Register of Historic Places
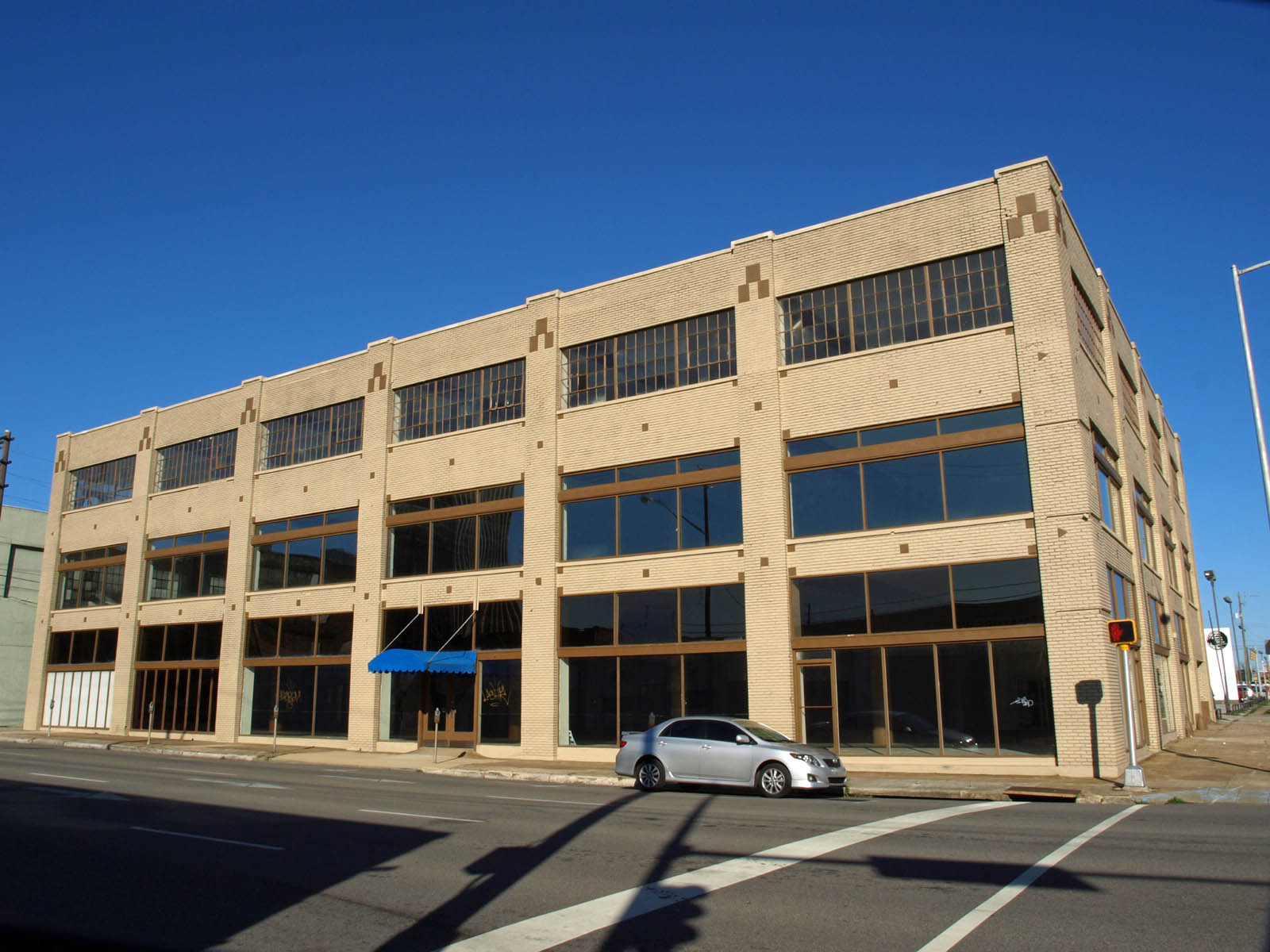

- Location within Alabama
- Location: Roughly bounded by First Ave. N., 24th St. S., Fifth Ave. S. and 20th St. S., Birmingham, Alabama
- Coordinates: 33°30′45″N 86°48′04″W
- Area: 42 acres (17 ha)
- Architectural style: Late 19th and Early 20th Century American Movements, Modern Movement, Italianate
- NRHP reference No.: 91000661
- Added to NRHP: May 30, 1991

The Automotive Historic District in Birmingham, Alabama, United States, is a 42-acre (17 ha) historic district roughly bounded by First Avenue North, 24th Street South, Fifth Avenue South, and 20th Street South. It was listed on the National Register of Historic Places in 1991. At the time of listing, the district included 119 contributing buildings (and 17 non-contributing ones) and four contributing structures (and 16 non-contributing ones).

The district covers a second area of commercial development south of the downtown area of Birmingham.

== See also ==
- Birmingham District
