= Sloss Furnaces =

- Sloss Blast Furnace Site
- U.S. National Register of Historic Places
- U.S. National Historic Landmark
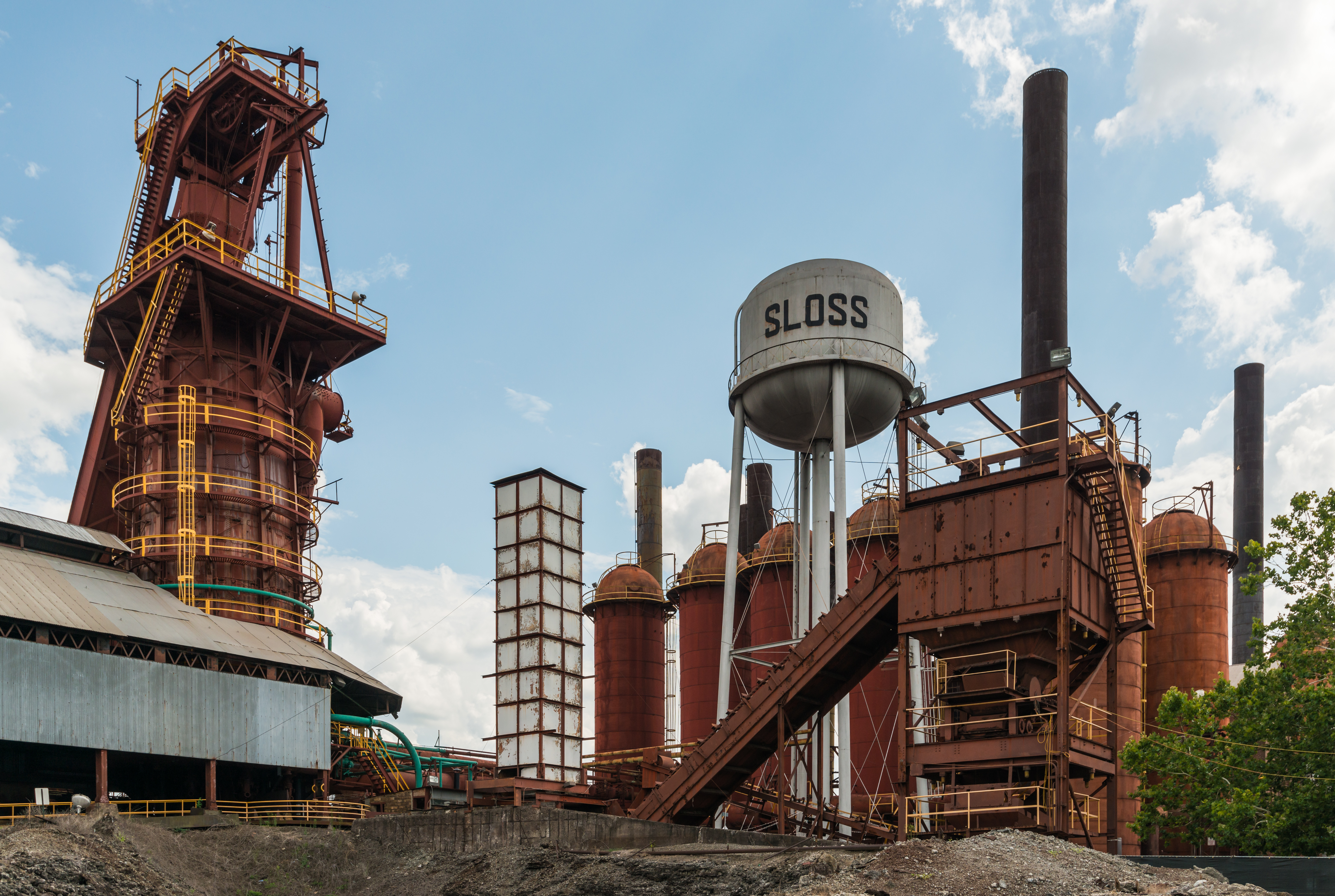
- Sloss Furnaces, Birmingham, in July 2016

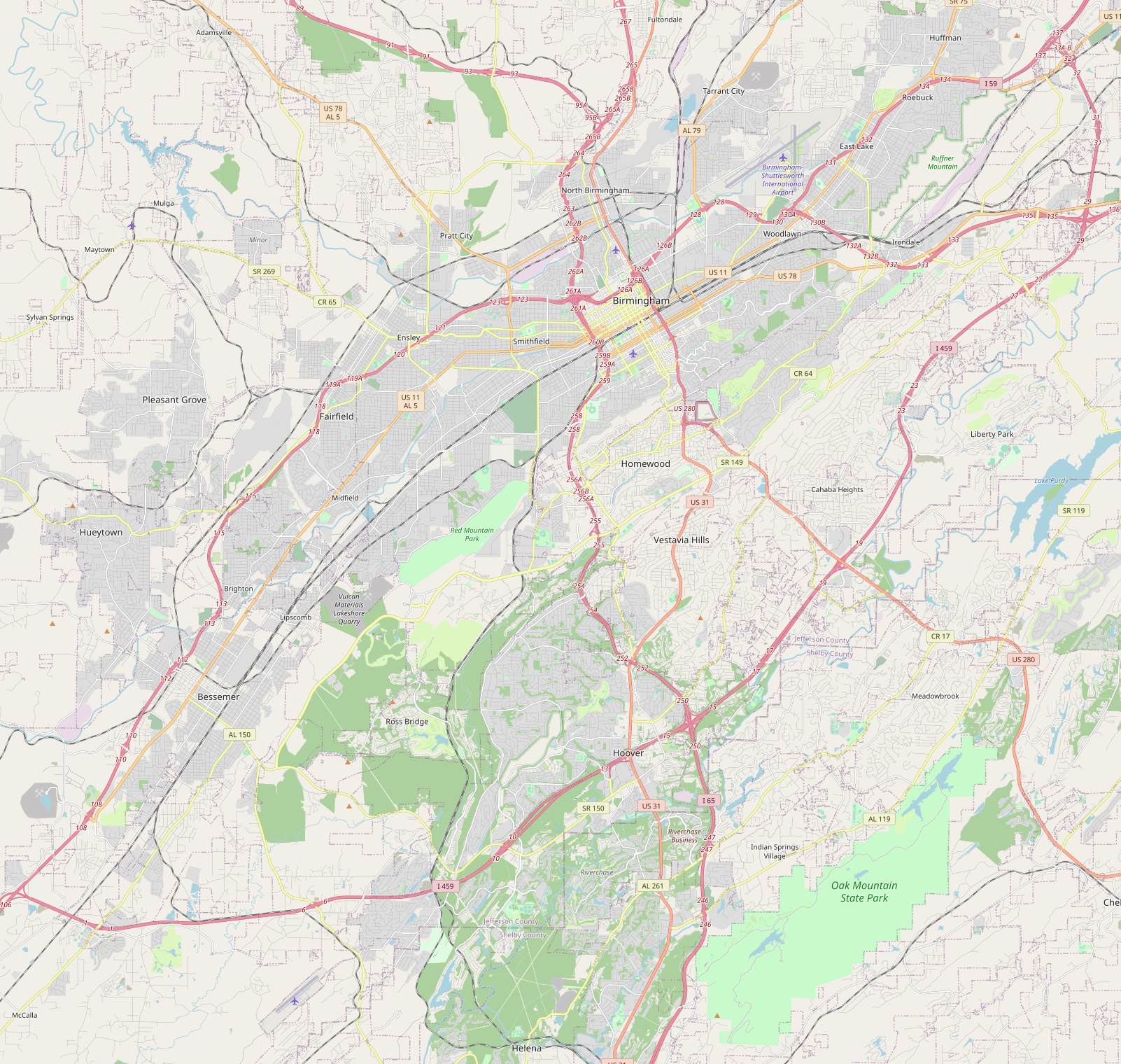
- Location within Birmingham, Alabama Location within Alabama Location within the United States
- Location: 1st Ave. at 32nd St. Birmingham, Alabama
- Coordinates: 33°31′14.36″N 86°47′28.70″W
- Built: 1881
- Architects: James W. Sloss; Et al.
- NRHP reference No.: 72000162

Significant dates
- Added to NRHP: June 22, 1972
- Designated NHL: May 29, 1981

Sloss Furnaces is a National Historic Landmark in Birmingham, Alabama in the United States. It operated as a pig iron-producing blast furnace from 1882 to 1971. After closing, it became one of the first industrial sites (and the only blast furnace) in the U.S. to be preserved and restored for public use. In 1981, the furnaces were designated a National Historic Landmark by the United States Department of the Interior.

The site currently serves as an interpretive museum of industry and hosts a metal arts program. It also serves as a concert and festival venue. A new visitor center was built in 2015 and opened in 2016. The furnace site, along a wide strip of land reserved in Birmingham's original city plan for railroads and industry, hosts students through their education programs. The museum is free to visit.

== History ==
Colonel James Withers Sloss was one of the founders of Birmingham, helping to promote railroad development in Jones Valley, Alabama and participating in the Pratt Coke and Coal Company, one of the new city's first manufacturers. In 1881 he formed his own company, the Sloss Furnace Company, and began construction of Birmingham's first blast furnace on 50 acres (202,000 m²) of land donated by the Elyton Land Company for industrial development. The engineer in charge of construction was Harry Hargreaves, a former student of English inventor Thomas Whitwell. The two Whitwell-type furnaces were 60 feet (18 m) tall and 18 feet (5.4 m) in diameter. The first blast was initiated in April 1882. The facility produced 24,000 tons of high quality iron during its first year of operation. Sloss iron won a bronze medal at the Southern Exposition held in 1883 at Louisville, Kentucky.

In 1886 Sloss retired and sold the company to a group of investors who reorganized it in 1899 as the Sloss-Sheffield Steel and Iron Company.

New blowers were installed in 1902, new boilers in 1906 and 1914 and the furnaces completely rebuilt with modern equipment between 1927 and 1929. In 1909 James Pickering Dovel had become the superintendent of construction. For the next 21 years, Sloss was Dovel's workshop for invention. He developed gas cleaning equipment, modified the design of the furnaces, and improved the linings of the furnaces. In all, some 17 patents are credited to Dovel. Sloss's No. 2 Furnace, rebuilt in 1927, included many of these inventions, earning Dovel and Sloss a national reputation for innovation. Through this aggressive campaign of modernization and expansion, including furnace and mining and quarrying operations all around Jefferson County, Sloss-Sheffield became the second largest seller of pig-iron in the district and among the largest in the world. During this period the company built 48 small cottages for workers near the downtown furnace — a community that became known as "Sloss Quarters" or just "the quarters".

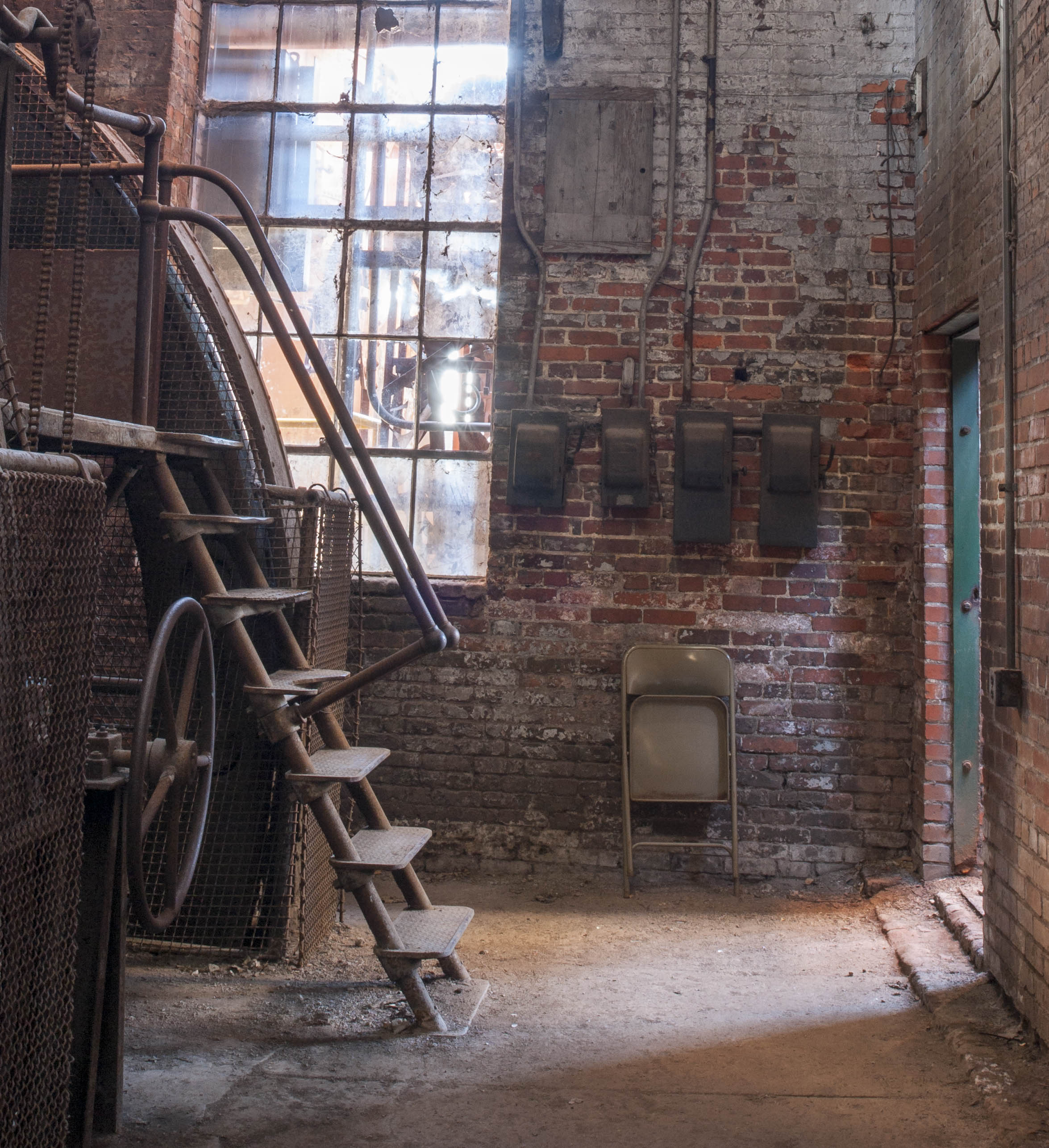
Visitors can walk through the remains of the site

In 1952, the Sloss Furnaces were acquired by the U.S. Pipe and Foundry Company, and sold nearly two decades later in 1969 to the Jim Walter Corp. The Birmingham area had been suffering from a serious air pollution problem during the 1950s and 1960s due to the iron and steel industry there, and Federal legislation such as the U.S. Clean Air Act encouraged the closure of older and out-of-date smelting works. Also, by the early 1960s, higher-yielding brown ores from other regions were feeding the blast furnaces.

The Jim Walter company closed the furnaces two years later, and then donated the property to the Alabama State Fair Authority for possible development as a museum of industry. The authority determined that redevelopment was not feasible and made plans to demolish the furnaces. Local preservationists formed the Sloss Furnace Association to lobby for preservation of this site, which is of central importance to the history of Birmingham. In 1976, the site was documented for the Historic American Engineering Record and its historic significance was detailed in a study commissioned by the city. Birmingham voters approved a $3.3 million bond issue in 1977 to preserve the site. This money went towards stabilization of the main structures and the construction of a visitors' center and the establishment of a metal arts program. The Sloss Furnaces site became a National Historic Landmark in 1981, and opened to the public as the nation's first and only 20th century blast furnace site preserved as a museum on Labor Day weekend, 1983.

In February 2009, Sloss became the new home of the SLSF 4018 steam locomotive, which was relocated from Birmingham's Fair Park.

== Present use ==
In June 2012, a formal groundbreaking ceremony was held at the site to commemorate the beginning of construction on a new 16,000 square foot Visitors' and Education Center to be located on the south-west corner of the property. The new complex, funded jointly by the City of Birmingham and the Sloss Foundation, hosts educational exhibits relevant to the site's history, administrative offices, as well as additional multi-purpose space for public events. Sloss Furnaces holds metal arts classes and events, food festivals, fun runs, education programs, weddings, and concerts, as well as Historic Night Tours. The facility improvements are in line with an expected ongoing project within the city to construct new "greenway" spaces in the downtown area, possibly linking several popular city venues in the future. The story of Sloss' preservation and modern use was documented in Alabama Public Television's Sloss: Industry to Art.

In 2022, the Sloss Furnaces was a competition venue for the 2022 World Games. Sport climbing, breaking, parkour, and beach handball all held their respective competitions there.

The yearly Hardcore Punk festival Furnace Fest was hosted at the Sloss Furnaces from 2000-2003, and once again from 2021 until presently.

In November 2024, the VEX Robotics Signature Event "Haunted" was hosted at the Sloss Furnaces Historical Landmark.

== Gallery ==
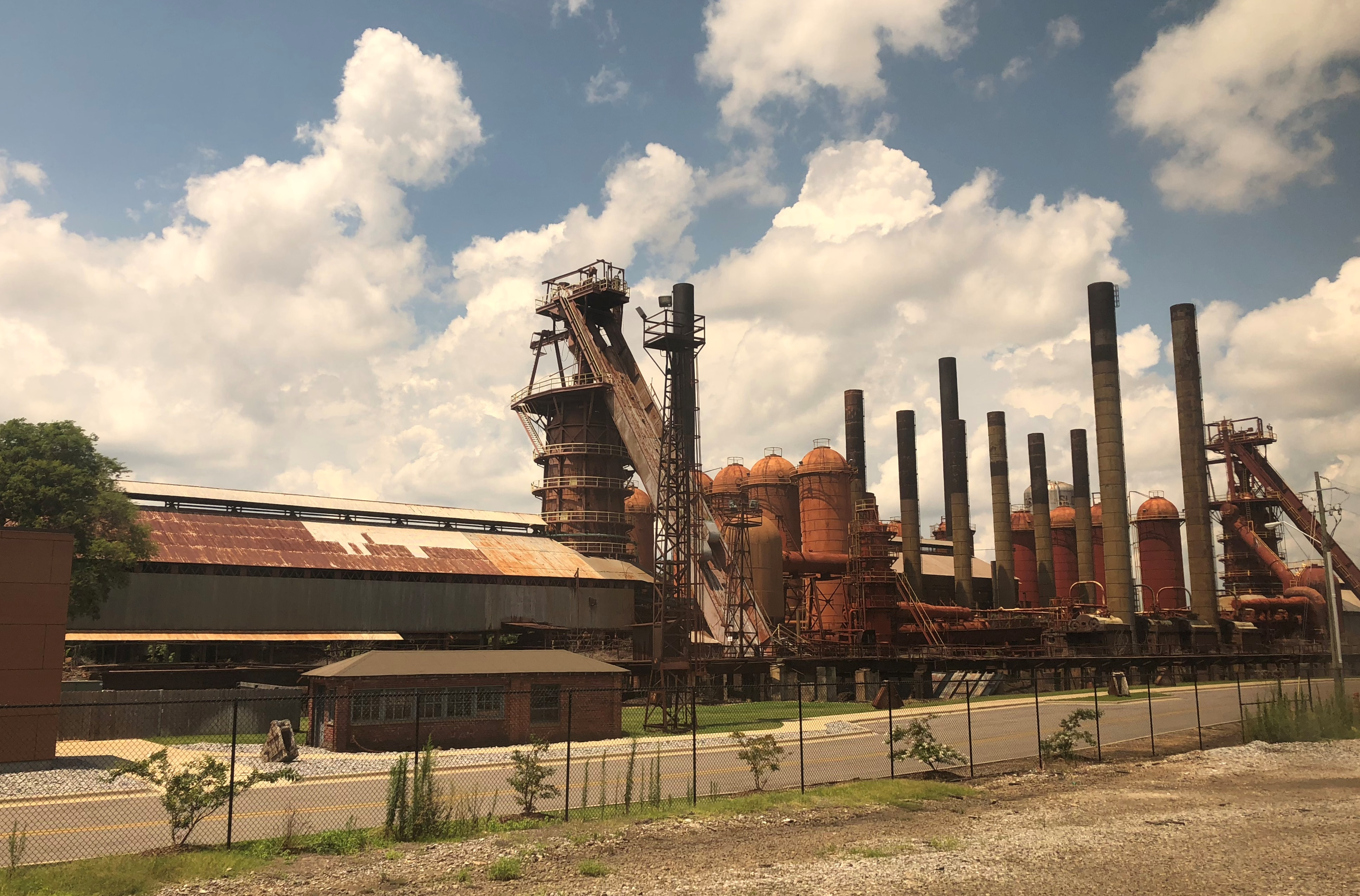

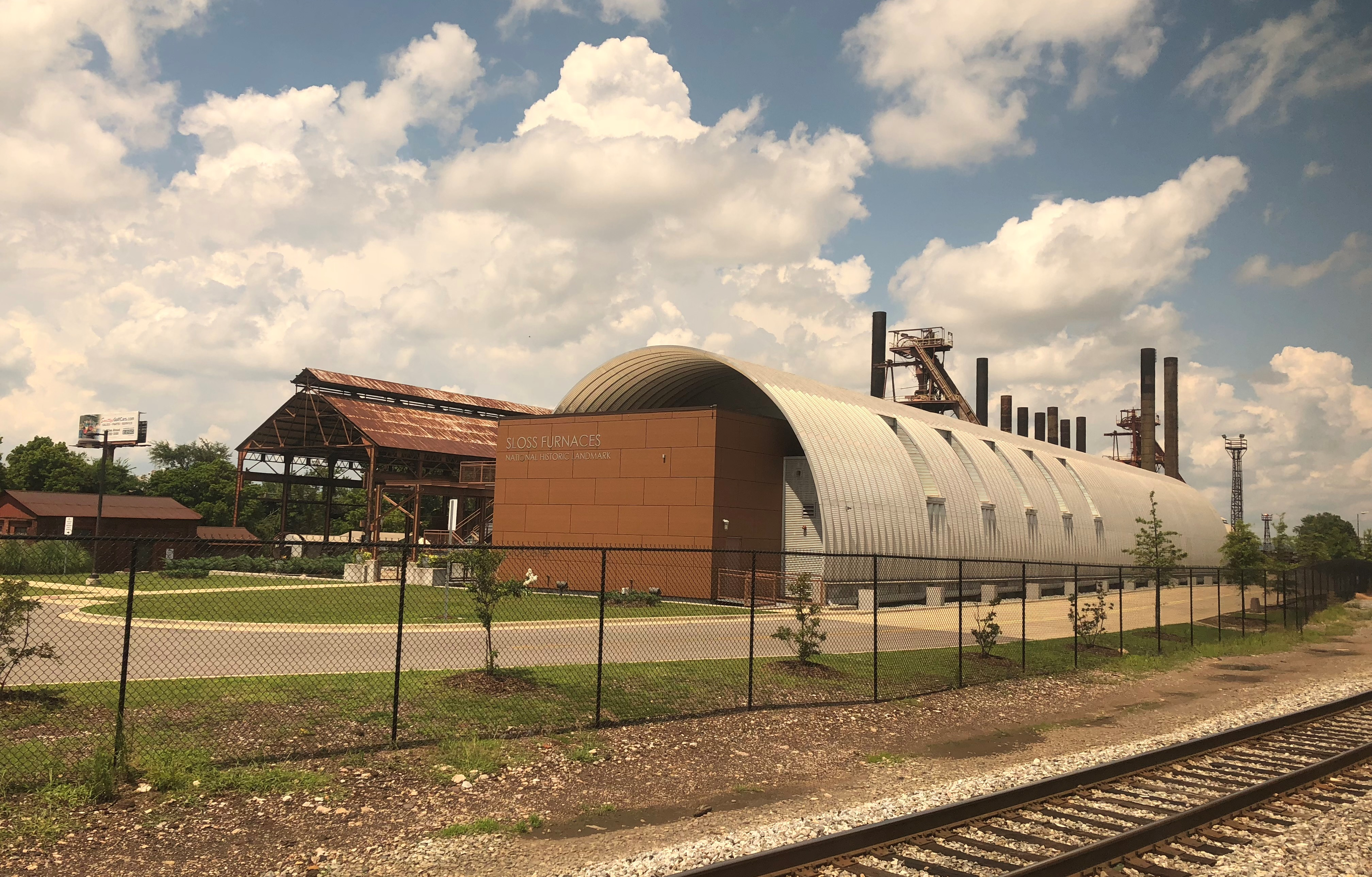

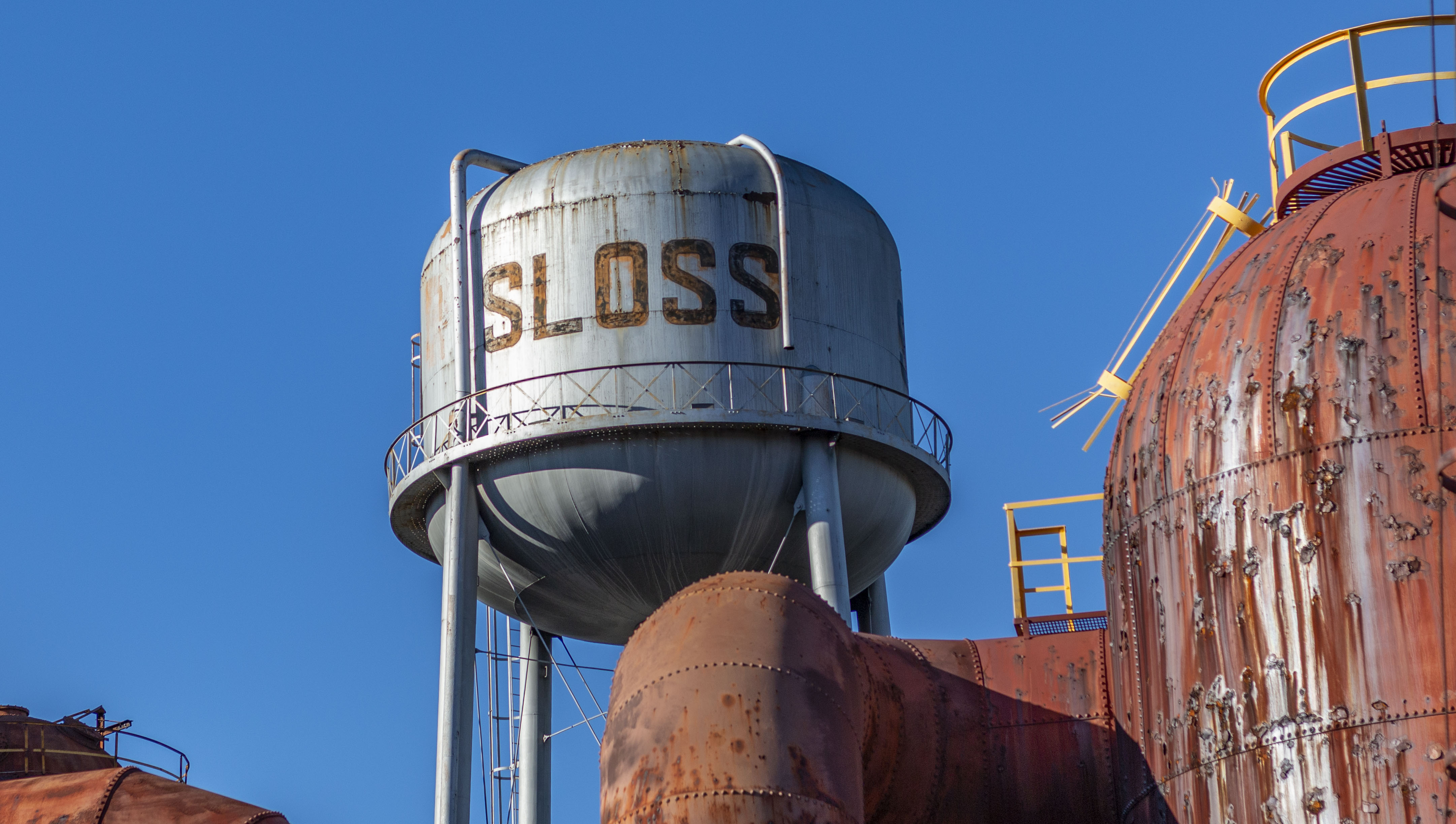
Water tower
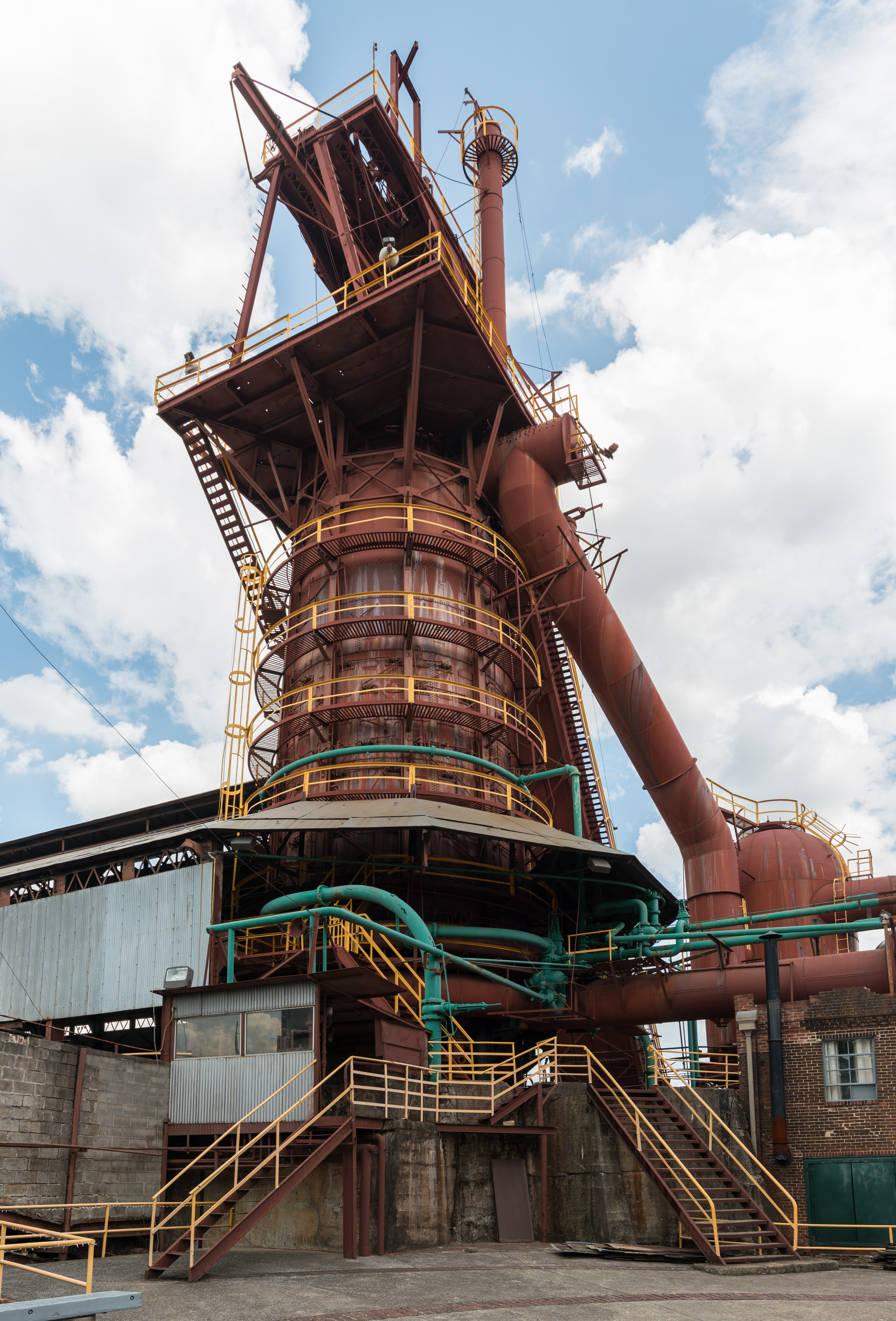
Blast furnace

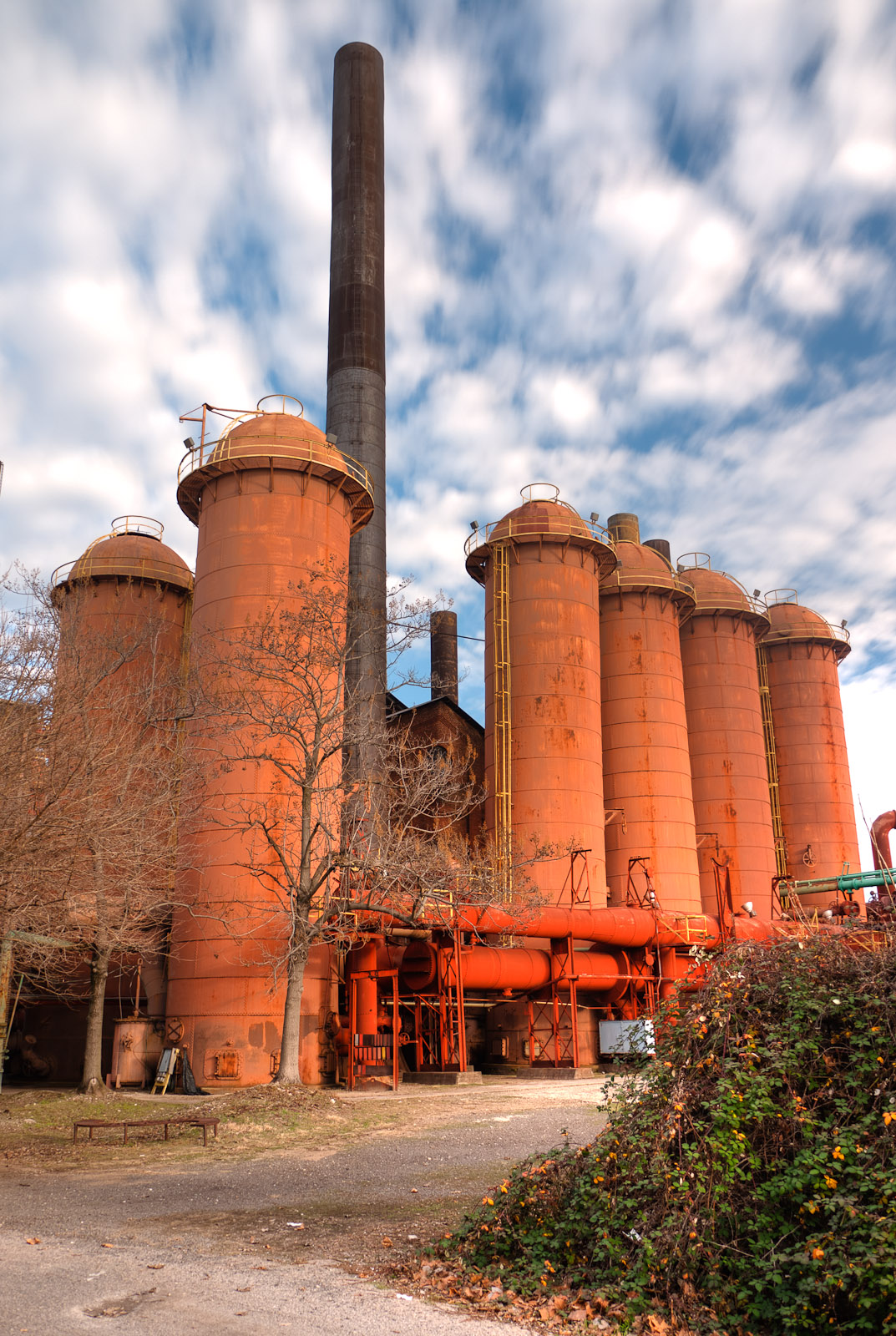
Cowper stoves

== See also ==
- Birmingham District
- Sloss Mines
- Lawang Sewu
- List of National Historic Landmarks in Alabama
