= Birmingham Southern Railroad =

1899-2012 railroad in Birmingham, Alabama

Overview
- Reporting mark: BS
- Locale: Birmingham, Alabama
- Dates of operation: 1899–2012
- Successor: Birmingham Terminal Railway

Technical
- Track gauge: 4 ft 8 1/2 in (1,435 mm)

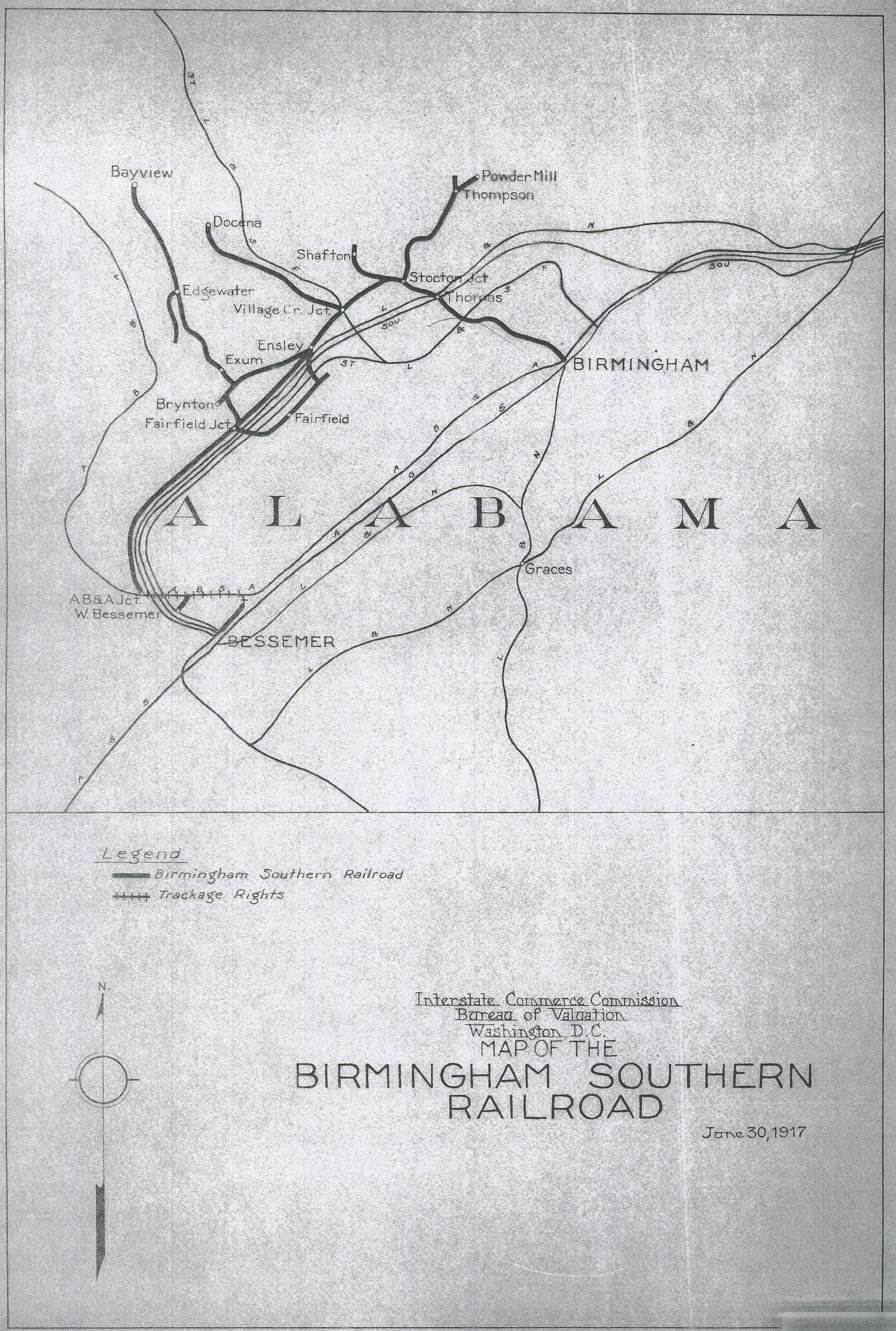
1917 map of the railroad

The Birmingham Southern Railroad (reporting mark BS) was a short-line railroad in the Birmingham, Alabama, United States, area. It ceased operating in 2012 when its assets were acquired by Watco's Birmingham Terminal Railway.

== History ==
The Birmingham Southern Railroad Company was founded on March 3, 1899. The line was originally built between 1878 from Birmingham to Pratt City to haul coal to the steel mills in Birmingham. The line was extended to Ensley in 1887.

The Louisville & Nashville Railroad and the Southern Railway jointly purchased and operated the Birmingham Southern shortly after the Birmingham Southern's organization. The Birmingham Southern was later sold to the Tennessee Coal, Iron & Railroad Company, which in 1906 became a part of the United States Steel Corporation and remained a U.S.S. Corp. subsidiary until 1988. The railroad expanded its lines in the western industrial section of Jefferson County by 1910. In 1966, the Birmingham Southern acquired the 18-mile (29 km) Federal Barge Lines (also known as the Barge Line Railroad) that ran from Ensley to Port Birmingham, giving the Birmingham Southern access to Mobile, Alabama, via the barge lines of the Warrior River. The Barge Line Railroad track was formerly owned by the Southern Railway.

In 1988, the Birmingham Southern was sold to Transtar, the transportation subsidiary of United States Steel. In 1989, United States Steel sold Transtar and Transtar became a privately held company specializing in the operation of short line railroads and barge lines that primarily serve United States Steel and its successors.

On May 17, 2007, Birmingham Southern Railroad was awarded a Gold E. H. Harriman Award in the S&T Group for the railroad's 2006 safety record.

On December 2, 2011, Watco announced plans to purchase the Birmingham Southern. The railroad was subsequently renamed Birmingham Terminal Railway; operations under the new name began on February 1, 2012.

== Surviving Locomotives ==
- Birmingham Southern No. 82, an ALCO HH900, is on static display at the Heart of Dixie Railroad Museum in Calera, Alabama.

== See also ==
- Birmingham District
