= Mulga, Alabama =

- Town
- Flag Seal

- Location of Mulga in Jefferson County, Alabama.
- Coordinates: 33°33′07″N 86°58′24″W
- Country: United States
- State: Alabama
- County: Jefferson

Area
  - Total: 0.87 sq mi (2.26 km^{2})
  - Land: 0.86 sq mi (2.24 km^{2})
  - Water: 0.0039 sq mi (0.01 km^{2})
- Elevation: 568 ft (173 m)

Population (2020)
  - Total: 784
  - Density: 905.6/sq mi (349.67/km^{2})
- Time zone: UTC-6 (Central (CST))
  - Summer (DST): UTC-5 (CDT)
- ZIP code: 35118
- Area codes: 205 & 659
- FIPS code: 01-52776
- GNIS feature ID: 2406218
- Website: townofmulga.com

Mulga is a town in western Jefferson County, Alabama, United States. It is north from the Birmingham suburb of Pleasant Grove. It includes the community of Bayview. Mulga was a company town operated by Birmingham Coal and Iron Company around the Mulga Mine and Mulga was also the name of an independent community in the area. The company town was incorporated in 1947.

As of the 2020 census, Mulga had a population of 784. Its communities were damaged by an F5 tornado on April 8, 1998. The town's name is possibly derived from the Creek word omalga meaning "all".

Coal has been mined in the area. Forty-one men died in a 1910 coal mine explosion.

== Geography ==
According to the U.S. Census Bureau, the town has a total area of 0.6 square miles (1.6 km^{2}), all land.

== Demographics ==
Historical population
Census	Pop.	Note	%±
1950	532		—
1960	482		−9.4%
1970	582		20.7%
1980	405		−30.4%
1990	261		−35.6%
2000	973		272.8%
2010	836		−14.1%
2020	784		−6.2%
U.S. Decennial Census; 2013 Estimate

=== 2020 census ===
Mulga town, Alabama – Racial and ethnic composition Note: the US Census treats Hispanic/Latino as an ethnic category. This table excludes Latinos from the racial categories and assigns them to a separate category. Hispanics/Latinos may be of any race.
Race / Ethnicity (NH = Non-Hispanic)	Pop 2000	Pop 2010	Pop 2020	% 2000	% 2010	% 2020
White alone (NH)	827	675	645	84.99%	80.74%	82.27%
Black or African American alone (NH)	128	141	104	13.16%	16.87%	13.27%
Native American or Alaska Native alone (NH)	6	0	3	0.62%	0.00%	0.38%
Asian alone (NH)	3	0	1	0.31%	0.00%	0.13%
Native Hawaiian or Pacific Islander alone (NH)	0	0	0	0.00%	0.00%	0.00%
Other race alone (NH)	0	4	2	0.00%	0.48%	0.26%
Mixed race or Multiracial (NH)	8	11	23	0.82%	1.32%	2.93%
Hispanic or Latino (any race)	1	5	6	0.10%	0.60%	0.77%
Total	973	836	784	100.00%	100.00%	100.00%

As of the 2020 United States census, there were 784 people, 359 households, and 237 families residing in the town.

=== 2000 census ===
As of the census of 2000, there were 973 people, 390 households, and 276 families residing in the town. The population density was 1,604.2 inhabitants per square mile (619.4/km^{2}). There were 425 housing units at an average density of 700.7 per square mile (270.5/km^{2}). The racial makeup of the town was 85.10% White, 13.16% Black or African American, 0.62% Native American, 0.31% Asian, and 0.82% from two or more races. 0.10% of the population were Hispanic or Latino of any race.

There were 390 households, out of which 32.8% had children under the age of 18 living with them, 51.0% were married couples living together, 16.4% had a female householder with no husband present, and 29.2% were non-families. 27.2% of all households were made up of individuals, and 17.2% had someone living alone who was 65 years of age or older. The average household size was 2.49 and the average family size was 3.04.

In the town, the population was spread out, with 24.4% under the age of 18, 9.4% from 18 to 24, 28.1% from 25 to 44, 21.4% from 45 to 64, and 16.9% who were 65 years of age or older. The median age was 37 years. For every 100 females, there were 85.7 males. For every 100 females age 18 and over, there were 79.1 males.

The median income for a household in the town was $36,500, and the median income for a family was $41,382. Males had a median income of $31,438 versus $23,750 for females. The per capita income for the town was $16,622. About 8.6% of families and 10.8% of the population were below the poverty line, including 13.5% of those under age 18 and 14.0% of those age 65 or over.
