= James Sloss =

American businessman (1820–1890)

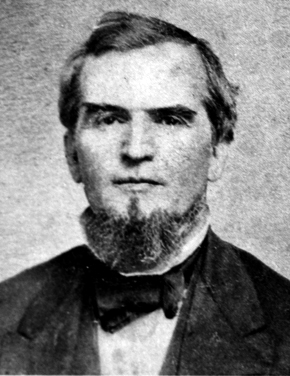
- Born: James Withers Sloss; 7 April 1820; Mooresville, Alabama
- Died: 4 May 1890 (aged 70); Birmingham, Alabama
- Occupation: Industrialist
- Spouse(s): Mary Bigger (1842- Her death); Martha "Mattie" Lundie(1872-1890; His death)
- Children: 12
- Parent(s): Joseph Sloss and Clarissa Wasson

James Withers Sloss (April 7, 1820 – May 4, 1890) was a planter, industrialist, and the founder of the Sloss Furnaces, and a leading figure in the early development of Birmingham, Alabama.

== Early life ==
Sloss was born Limestone County in northern Alabama. His parents were Scotch-Irish. Though he had little formal education, he bought a store in Athens, Alabama. By successfully handling his store and his plantation, he quickly became one of the richest men in the state. After serving as a colonel in the Confederate Army during the Civil War, he became president of the railroad line between Nashville, Tennessee and Decatur, Alabama. He became a leading figure in encouraging Alabama's industrial development after the Civil War, and in 1871 he persuaded the Louisville and Nashville Railroad to finish a line of railroad track between Birmingham and Decatur.

== Work in Birmingham ==
Sloss knew that all of the ingredients needed to make pig iron were present in Birmingham. Along with Henry F. DeBardeleben and James Aldrich, Sloss formed the Pratt Coal and Coke Company. It later became the largest mining operation in the area, the remnants of which today include the Sloss Mines. Through the work of the company, Sloss became the first person to show that pig iron could be made in Birmingham purely from Alabama's iron ore, coke, and limestone. Again working in conjunction with DeBardeleben, Sloss founded a furnace company in 1880 and started construction in 1881. It opened in 1882 under the name of the "City Furnaces," though it is today known as Sloss Furnaces. Sloss retired in 1886.

He also served as the president of the Birmingham water works.

== Legacy ==
Sloss's success in bringing a railroad to Birmingham transformed the new community into a thriving city. Because of the deal that Sloss brokered with them, the Louisville and Nashville Railroad invested $30 million (~$837 million in 2024) in mines, steamships, and other Alabama industries in the 1870s. Sloss was so influential in the development of the city of Birmingham that the Birmingham press suggested in 1881 that he be elected the state Governor:

His excellent business qualifications, brilliant intellect, splendid character, and fine executive ability, all combined, make him the grandest man in Alabama today for our chief executive. He is the very personification of Christian manhood and integrity, possessing the qualifications of head and heart which we should emulate.

He is buried in Birmingham's Oak Hill Cemetery.
