= Bayview, Alabama =

Town in Alabama

Coordinates: 33.559787°N 86.975048°W

Bayview is a community in Jefferson County, Alabama, United States. It is north from the Birmingham suburb of Pleasant Grove. This community is built around Bayview Lake. It voted to be annexed by its nearest town of Mulga. However, Bayview today retains its own community identity.

== Demographics ==
Historical population
Census	Pop.	Note	%±
1950	1,420		—
1960	1,081		−23.9%
U.S. Decennial Census

Bay View was listed as an unincorporated community on the 1950 and 1960 U.S. Census rolls.

== History ==
It was developed as a company town by the Tennessee Coal, Iron and Railroad Co. (TCI) for workers employed at the nearby TCI mines coal mine and their families. It was a model community when it was created and it received an award at the New York World's Fair. The community included a commissary for shopping, doctor's office, schools, community center/library, churches, and parks. Public bus service was available to other communities in the county.

This community typically consisted of two-, three-, four-, and five-room houses that were owned by TCI and rented to the workers. The rent was US$2.00 per room per month for the TCI employees living in the homes. Later TCI eliminated the rental program and sold the homes to the workers. TCI was later purchased by U.S. Steel corporation.

Some residents in the community then worked at the nearby Edgewater mine. Today, residents in Bayview work for businesses across the county and are not exclusively associated with the mining industry.
