= Saint Rose Academy =

Coordinates: 33°29′55.31″N 86°47′16.28″W

- 1401 22nd St South Birmingham, AL 35205

Information
- Type: Private
- Motto: Veritas et Caritas
- Established: 1956
- Principal: Sister Mary Juliana, O.P.
- Staff: 27
- Grades: PreK-8
- Enrollment: 183
- Colors: Black and white
- Mascot: Knight (formerly the Llama)
- Website: http://www.strosebhm.org

Saint Rose Academy, located in Birmingham, Alabama atop Red Mountain, is a private, co-educational Catholic elementary school run by the Dominican Sisters of St. Cecilia.

== History ==
Saint Rose Academy was established in 1956. The school was originally the home of Terence Mackin who gave his home to the Dominican sisters of Nashville so that a school could be created. His sister Sister Aloysius Mackin helped with the creation of the school. In 1962 more classrooms were added to the Mackin house. A few years later it was the first private school in Birmingham to desegregate. In 1993 the gym building was built which contains three classrooms as well as a multipurpose sport court and music room. A few years later the school bought the Discovery Place building.

== Campus ==
Saint Rose Academy's campus is located just above the Red Mountain Expressway Cut. The school has four buildings on its campus - The Mackin House, a gymnasium that also houses classrooms, a building with classrooms, including a large library and a science lab, and the primary building that was formerly part of the Discovery Place. The school has two playgrounds, an outdoor classroom, and a grassy lawn.

== Students, faculty, and administration ==
Saint Rose Academy has an average class size of 22 with one class per grade. The faculty is made of a mixture of Dominican sisters and lay teachers. The position of principal is filled with a Dominican sister while other positions are filled based on need.

== Uniforms ==
Students may wear several shirts, including burgundy polo shirts. Girls may wear skirts, shorts, or trousers. Boys may wear shorts or trousers. Brown shoes are required.

On Mass days (mostly Fridays), students must wear Oxford shirts and boys must wear ties. Girls must wear skirts.

== Athletics ==
Saint Rose Academy is a member of the Toy Bowl league, a sports division for Catholic schools in Birmingham. They participate in volleyball and basketball as well as a track and field meet that takes place at John Carroll Catholic High School in May. They are also part of the John Carroll Middle School sports program that is part of the Alabama High School Athletic Association. .

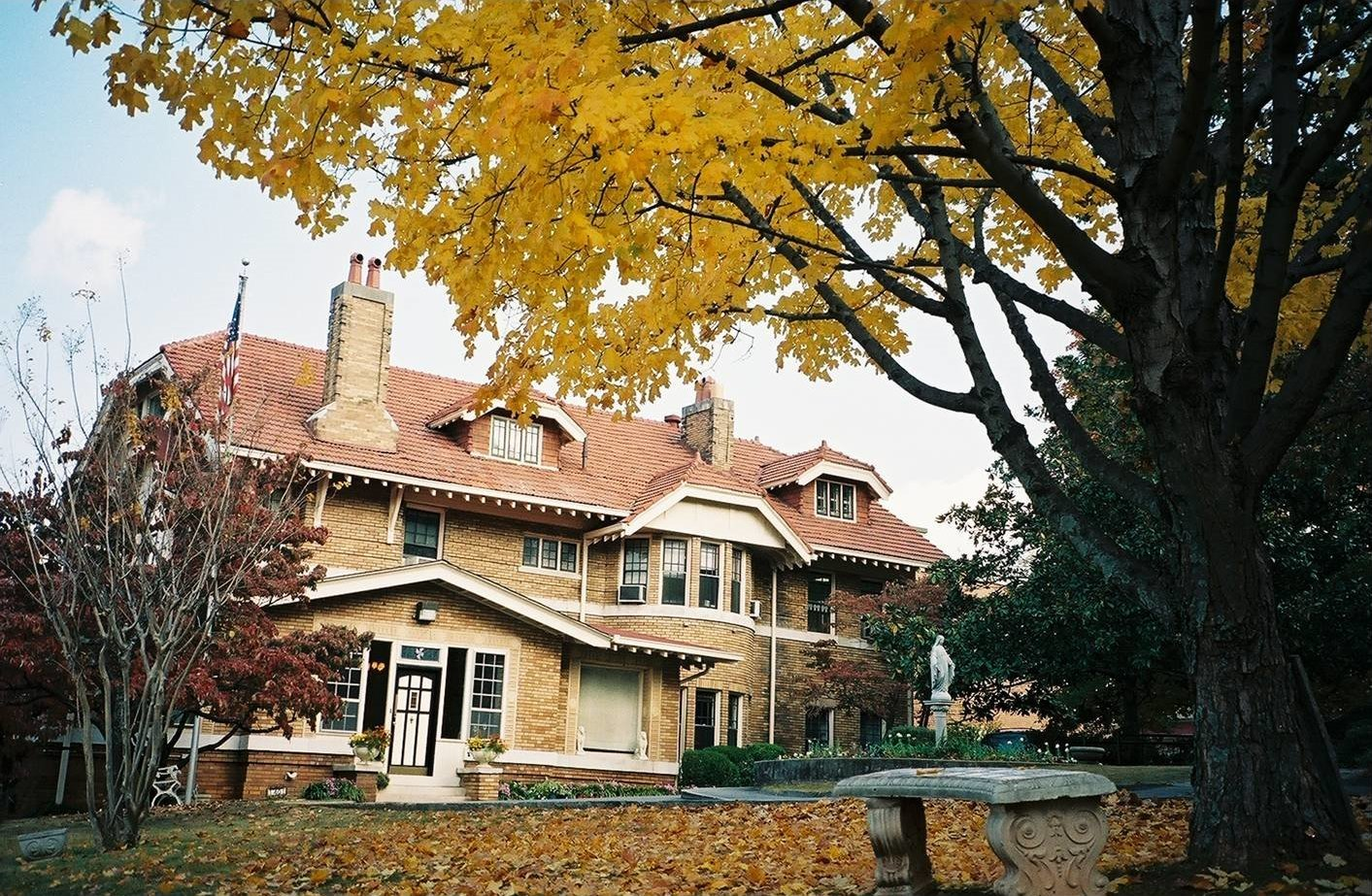
Exterior of the Mackin House in the fall
