= Lipscomb, Alabama =

City in Alabama, United States

Lipscomb
- City
- Location of Lipscomb in Jefferson County, Alabama.
- Coordinates: 33°25′34″N 86°55′34″W
- Country: United States
- State: Alabama
- County: Jefferson

Area
  - Total: 1.18 sq mi (3.05 km^{2})
  - Land: 1.18 sq mi (3.05 km^{2})
  - Water: 0 sq mi (0.00 km^{2})
- Elevation: 545 ft (166 m)

Population (2020)
  - Total: 2,086
  - Density: 1,773.7/sq mi (684.84/km^{2})
- Time zone: UTC-6 (Central (CST))
  - Summer (DST): UTC-5 (CDT)
- Area codes: 205 & 659
- FIPS code: 01-43336
- GNIS feature ID: 2404936
- Website: lipscombalabama.com

Lipscomb is a city in south central Jefferson County, Alabama. It is part of the Birmingham, Alabama, metropolitan area. At the 2020 census, the population was 2,086.

It does not have its own U.S. Post Office or ZIP code, instead sharing the Bessemer ZIP code (35020).

== Geography ==
According to the U.S. Census Bureau, the town has a total area of 1.1 square miles (2.8 km^{2}), all land.

== Demographics ==
Historical population
Census	Pop.	Note	%±
1920	1,605		—
1930	1,774		10.5%
1940	1,740		−1.9%
1950	2,550		46.6%
1960	2,811		10.2%
1970	3,225		14.7%
1980	3,741		16.0%
1990	2,892		−22.7%
2000	2,458		−15.0%
2010	2,210		−10.1%
2020	2,086		−5.6%
U.S. Decennial Census

=== Racial and ethnic composition ===
Lipscomb city, Alabama – Racial and ethnic composition Note: the US Census treats Hispanic/Latino as an ethnic category. This table excludes Latinos from the racial categories and assigns them to a separate category. Hispanics/Latinos may be of any race.
Race / Ethnicity (NH = Non-Hispanic)	Pop 2000	Pop 2010	Pop 2020	% 2000	% 2010	% 2020
White alone (NH)	774	404	273	31.49%	18.28%	13.09%
Black or African American alone (NH)	1,612	1,336	1,289	65.58%	60.45%	61.79%
Native American or Alaska Native alone (NH)	7	17	6	0.28%	0.77%	0.29%
Asian alone (NH)	1	1	1	0.04%	0.05%	0.05%
Native Hawaiian or Pacific Islander alone (NH)	3	0	1	0.12%	0.00%	0.05%
Other race alone (NH)	0	2	2	0.00%	0.09%	0.10%
Mixed race or Multiracial (NH)	6	14	65	0.24%	0.63%	3.12%
Hispanic or Latino (any race)	55	436	449	2.24%	19.73%	21.52%
Total	2,458	2,210	2,086	100.00%	100.00%	100.00%

=== 2020 census ===
As of the 2020 census, Lipscomb had a population of 2,086. There were 824 households and 391 families. The median age was 37.5 years. 25.1% of residents were under the age of 18 and 16.5% of residents were 65 years of age or older. For every 100 females there were 86.8 males, and for every 100 females age 18 and over there were 81.6 males age 18 and over.

100.0% of residents lived in urban areas, while 0.0% lived in rural areas.

There were 824 households in Lipscomb, of which 31.1% had children under the age of 18 living in them. Of all households, 23.3% were married-couple households, 22.8% were households with a male householder and no spouse or partner present, and 48.4% were households with a female householder and no spouse or partner present. About 38.2% of all households were made up of individuals and 17.1% had someone living alone who was 65 years of age or older.

There were 963 housing units, of which 14.4% were vacant. The homeowner vacancy rate was 2.1% and the rental vacancy rate was 7.7%.

=== 2010 census ===
At the 2010 census, there were 2,210 people, 812 households, and 554 families living in the town. The population density was 2,009.1 inhabitants per square mile (775.7/km^{2}). There were 950 housing units at an average density of 863.6 per square mile (333.4/km^{2}). The racial makeup of the town was 61.0% Black or African American, 22.0% White, 1.1% Native American, 0.0% Asian, 0.0% Pacific Islander, 15.0% from other races, and 0.9% from two or more races. 19.7% of the population were Hispanic or Latino of any race.

Of the 812 households 28.9% had children under the age of 18 living with them, 33.5% were married couples living together, 28.1% had a female householder with no husband present, and 31.8% were non-families. 27.6% of households were one person and 12.4% were one person aged 65 or older. The average household size was 2.72 and the average family size was 3.31.

The age distribution was 26.5% under the age of 18, 9.5% from 18 to 24, 26.2% from 25 to 44, 26.0% from 45 to 64, and 11.8% 65 or older. The median age was 34.8 years. For every 100 females, there were 92.2 males. For every 100 females age 18 and over, there were 95.7 males.

The median household income was $27,600 and the median family income was $45,000. Males had a median income of $32,261 versus $19,965 for females. The per capita income for the town was $16,892. About 13.5% of families and 15.1% of the population were below the poverty line, including 19.9% of those under age 18 and 22.4% of those age 65 or over.

=== 2000 census ===
At the 2000 census, there were 2,458 people, 901 households, and 634 families living in the town. The population density was 2,163.6 inhabitants per square mile (835.4/km^{2}). There were 1,108 housing units at an average density of 975.3 per square mile (376.6/km^{2}). The racial makeup of the town was 32.55% White, 65.58% Black or African American, 0.28% Native American, 0.04% Asian, 0.12% Pacific Islander, 0.94% from other races, and 0.49% from two or more races. 2.24% of the population were Hispanic or Latino of any race.

Of the 901 households 35.1% had children under the age of 18 living with them, 41.4% were married couples living together, 23.4% had a female householder with no husband present, and 29.6% were non-families. 26.4% of households were one person and 9.8% were one person aged 65 or older. The average household size was 2.73 and the average family size was 3.35.

The age distribution was 30.1% under the age of 18, 8.5% from 18 to 24, 29.9% from 25 to 44, 21.0% from 45 to 64, and 10.5% 65 or older. The median age was 33 years. For every 100 females, there were 96.6 males. For every 100 females age 18 and over, there were 86.2 males.

The median household income was $30,865 and the median family income was $35,556. Males had a median income of $26,908 versus $21,150 for females. The per capita income for the town was $13,582. About 15.9% of families and 16.2% of the population were below the poverty line, including 17.7% of those under age 18 and 16.4% of those age 65 or over.

== History ==
The city of Lipscomb was first incorporated on June 30, 1910, and was named for L. Y. Lipscomb, one of three brothers who first settled in the area in 1885. As early as the 1880s, the community was called Wheeling and the town had 200-300 residents by 1906. The community was originally named after Wheeling, West Virginia because the owners of Woodward Iron Company, who employed many of the residents, also had business interests in that state. Y. L. Lipscomb ran a general store on the old South Bessemer car line which opened in 1890, though the first settlers actually came to the area in the 1830s, when Vincent Loveless established his farm in the area. The first church was established in the area in June 1834 when a log structure was built named Union Baptist Church which sat on the site of the present church.

== Government ==
The town's major source of revenue is an illegal bingo hall that has been repeatedly shut by state authorities.

== Notable person ==
- Virginia Hill was a Chicago Outfit courier and was famous for being the steady girlfriend of mobster Bugsy Siegel.
