= Birmingham District =

Geological area in Alabama, US

Coordinates: 33°31′N 86°48′W

The Birmingham District is a geological area in the vicinity of Birmingham, Alabama, where the raw materials for making steel - limestone, iron ore, and coal - are found together in abundance. The district includes Red Mountain, Jones Valley, and the Warrior and Cahaba coal fields in Central Alabama.

== Industrial development ==
The industrial development of these resources began, in limited fashion, before the American Civil War (attracting the attention of Wilson's Raiders in the course of that conflict).

Beginning in 1871 with the founding of the City of Birmingham and the construction of the first blast furnaces, the development of the district enjoyed explosive growth, slowed only by a deficit of skilled labor and investment capital. This boom earned for Birmingham the nicknames "The Magic City" and "Pittsburgh of the South", and also spurred the growth of several independent industrial cities and dozens of company towns.

By the end of the 19th century, Birmingham was the third-largest exporter of pig iron in the world, producing 3/4 of United States exports. The region was also a major exporter of coal, and, as technology advanced, became a major steel producing district. With a few notable exceptions such as cast iron pipes and fittings, most of the district's economic output was in basic materials rather than in finished consumer products.

== Documentation and preservation ==
As the steel-making industry has diminished in its economic importance to the district, many of the sites have been abandoned or dismantled. Preservationists are attempting to document and preserve the physical evidence of Birmingham's industrial history. In the spring of 1993 a large-scale survey was undertaken for the Birmingham Historical Society and the Historic American Buildings Survey/Historic American Engineering Record. The results of that survey were published in the book Birmingham Bound.

== See also ==
- Aldrich Coal Mine Museum
- American Cast Iron Pipe Company
- Automotive Historic District
- Birmingham Southern Railroad
- Boshell's Mill
- Brierfield Furnace
- Brookside, Alabama
- Dora, Alabama
- Drummond Company
- Finley Roundhouse
- Flintridge Building
- Heart of Dixie Railroad Museum
- Holt Lock and Dam
- Iron & Steel Museum of Alabama
- James H. Miller Jr. Electric Generating Plant
- McWane
- Norfolk and Western 611
- Norfolk and Western 1218
- O'Neal Steel
- Pyne Mine
- Red Mountain Expressway Cut
- Republic Steel
- Ruffner Mountain Nature Preserve
- Shelby Iron Company
- Sloss Furnaces
- Sloss Mines
- Tannehill Furnace
- Tennessee Coal, Iron and Railroad Company
- Vulcan statue
- Wilson Dam
- Woodward Iron Company
