= Tennessee Coal, Iron and Railroad Company =

American steelmaking company

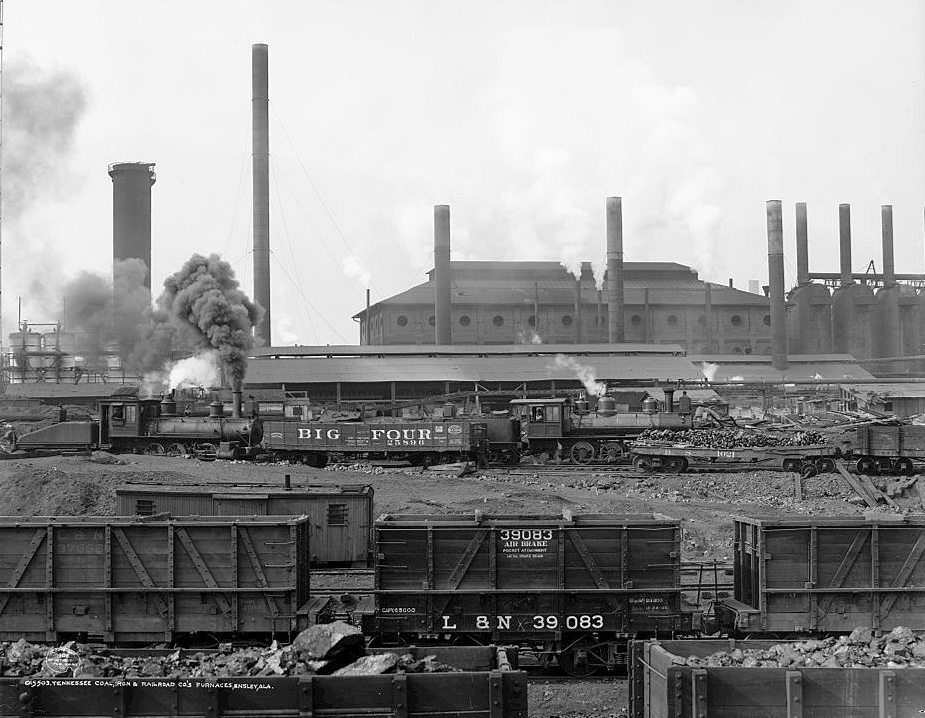
- Furnace of the Tennessee Coal, Iron, and Railroad Company, Ensley, Alabama, 1906.
- Type: Public company
- Industry: Steel milling Coal and Iron Mining
- Founded: 1852
- Defunct: 1952
- Fate: Became division of United States Steel Corporation
- Successor: Tennessee Coal & Iron Division: United States Steel Corporation
- Headquarters: Birmingham, Alabama
- Key people: George Gordon Crawford
- Products: Steels; Integrated Steel Products; Rail Transport; Real Estate
- Parent: United States Steel Corporation (from 1907)

The Tennessee Coal, Iron and Railroad Company (1852–1952), also known as TCI and the Tennessee Company, was a major American steel manufacturer with interests in coal mining, iron ore mining, and railroad operations. Originally based entirely within Tennessee, it relocated most of its business to Alabama in the late nineteenth century, following protests over its use of free convict labor. With a sizable real estate portfolio, the company owned several Birmingham satellite towns, including Ensley, Fairfield, Docena, Edgewater and Bayview. It also established a coal mining camp, which it sold to U.S. Steel, who eventually developed it into the Westfield, Alabama planned community.

At one time the second largest steel producer in the United States, TCI was listed on the first Dow Jones Industrial Average in 1896. In 1907, the company merged with its principal rival, the United States Steel Corporation. For the following 45 years, the Tennessee Coal, Iron and Railroad Company was then operated as a subsidiary of U. S. Steel, until it became a division of its parent company in 1952.

== History ==
=== Early history ===
The Tennessee Coal, Iron and Railroad Company was founded as the Sewanee Furnace Company, a small mining concern established in 1852 by Nashville entrepreneurs seeking to exploit Tennessee's rich coal reserves and the 19th century railroad boom. After losing money, the business was sold to New York investors in 1859, then reorganized as the Tennessee Coal and Rail Company; the outbreak of the Civil War the following year, however, would see the fleeting company repossessed by local creditors.

It became Tennessee's leading coal extractor over the next decade, mining and transporting coal around the towns of Cowan and Tracy City in the Cumberland Mountains, and soon branched out into coke manufacture. This practice of both extracting and moving coal to market by building private rail tracks was not unusual at the time; by owning the tracks that served their mines, businesses could undercut rivals at market by saving money on transportation. A Thomas O'Connor purchased the company in 1876 and expanded the business into iron manufacture in order to stimulate coke sales, building a blast furnace near Cowan. The business was subsequently renamed the Tennessee Coal, Iron, and Railroad Company. TCI never again changed its name, despite its later expansion into Alabama following the 1886 purchase of the Birmingham-based Pratt Coal and Iron Company.

As the company grew in the post-Civil War era, it made extensive use of convict labor, with its leaders arguing that this labor was more reliable than paid (and often unionized) labor. The company operated a stockade prison near Tracy City, which was the subject of labor unrest at the time of the Coal Creek War in northeastern Tennessee. Conditions in the prison and the coal mines were harsh, with the prison population dying at an average rate of 10% per year during its period of operation. The company also provided convict labor to other coal mining operators when they experienced or were threatened by labor action. Hostility in the state to the use of convict labor led to its end there in 1896. TCI relocated its offices to Birmingham in 1895, where it could still use convict labor, relegating its native state to relative unimportance.

A coking plant of Pratt Co., TCI's first purchase in Alabama and the catalyst for its ultimate relocation there

Smart investments, as well as the purchase of major competitors in 1888 and 1892 under the direction of financier Hiram Bond (TCI's Corporate General Superintendent), saw the firm grow rapidly. The corporation was for several decades one of the few major heavy industries based in the largely agricultural Southern United States, by a wide margin the largest blast furnace operator in the South, and at one time the second largest steel producer on the continent. Its 1900 asset sheet listed 17 blast furnaces, 3256 beehive coke ovens, 120 Solvay coke ovens, and 15 red ore mines, as well an extensive network of railroads, although following the panic of 1893 the company shifted its primary interests from railroads to steel. TCI's largest industrial plant was located in Ensley, a company town on the outskirts of Birmingham, Alabama, founded by company president Enoch Ensley in 1886. Ensley, Alabama was served at the time by the sizable Birmingham Southern Railroad (one of TCI's early acquisitions), which in 1899 contained four 200-ton blast furnaces. In 1906, two more furnaces were constructed, and 40,000 tonnes of steel were produced that year, feeding Ensley's integrated rail, wire and plate mills. The company was fiercely competitive with the larger Pittsburgh steel businesses to the north, owing to the remarkable fact that all the natural resources required to produce steel were located in abundance within a relatively small radius of the Birmingham mills.

=== From forced labor to paternalism ===
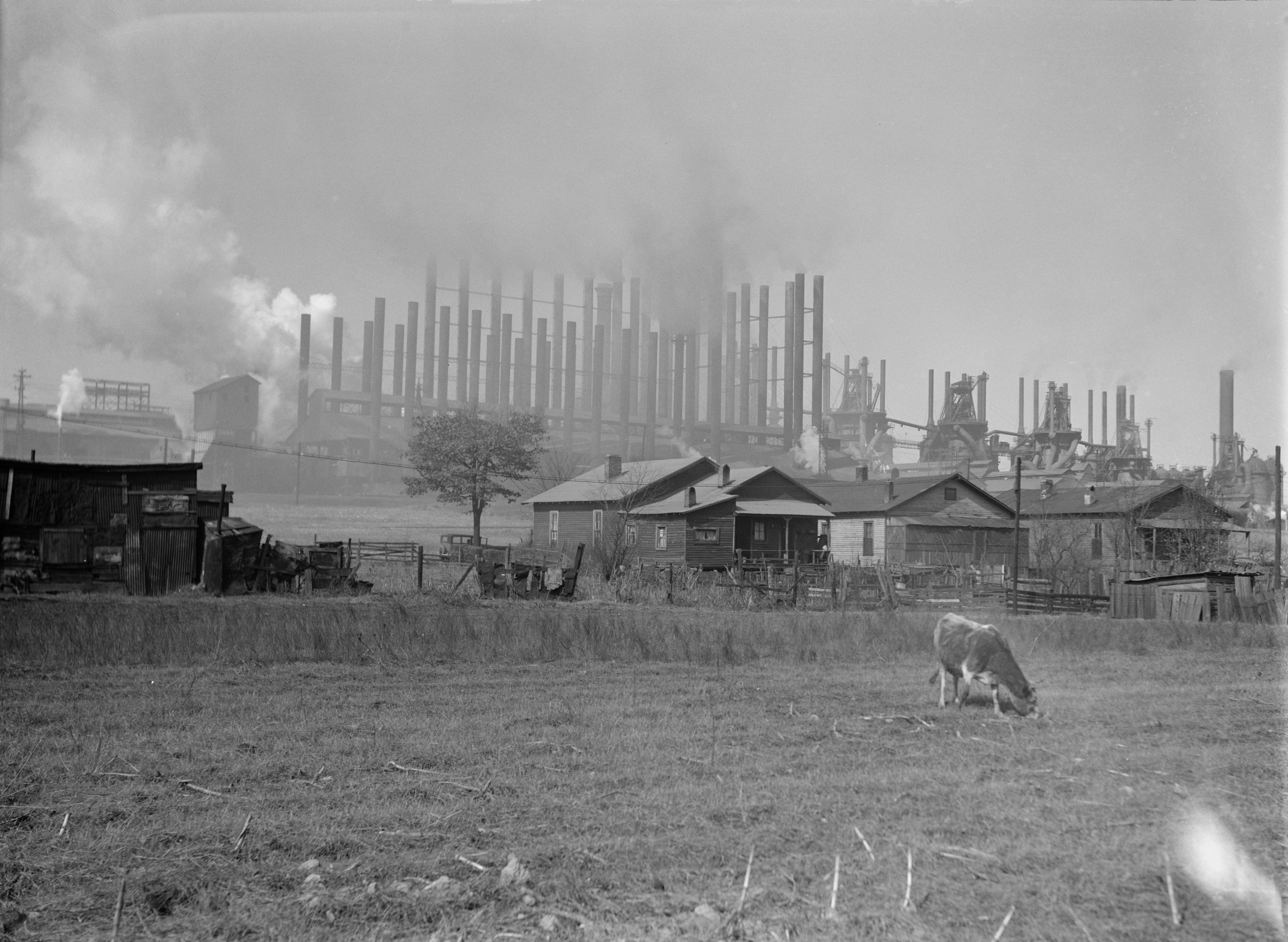
View of Ensley worker housing and steel works in February 1937. Arthur Rothstein for the U. S. Farm Security Administration

The Tennessee Coal, Iron and Railroad Company was one of the largest users of prison laborers, mostly Blacks convicted of petty crimes, as a method for paying fines. This practice was common for obtaining coal mining labor in Alabama at the close of the Reconstruction era. The number of convicts employed increased after U.S. Steel acquired TCI in 1907, as did the brutality of the conditions in which they labored. In 1908, the first full year of U. S. Steel's ownership of TCI, almost 60 prison workers died from workplace-related accidents. That same year, the new owners of the company discovered a 400% annual turnover in the workforce.

In the 1910s, TCI undertook a comprehensive program to stabilize its labor force, excluding prison laborers, by developing rigorously planned "model villages", thereby improving worker health, welfare and loyalty. This paternalistic approach carried with it obvious benefits for workers and their families, but also drew criticism for limiting the free movement and organization of labor.

=== Listing on the Dow Jones Index and merger with U. S. Steel ===
1899 Certificate for 100 Shares in TCI issued to FW Gilley Jr. & Co.

The Tennessee Coal, Iron and Railroad Company's status was bolstered when it became one of the first 12 companies to be listed on the inaugural Dow Jones Industrial Average, compiled in May 1896. It was not long, however, until TCI was eclipsed by its principal competitor, the United States Steel Corporation, a huge conglomerate formed in 1901 out of the enormous Carnegie and Federal steel empires. By the time of the Panic of 1907, U. S. Steel felt confident enough to launch a takeover bid of its Southern rival.

On the morning of Saturday November 2, 1907, banker and tycoon J. P. Morgan, one of the founders of U. S. Steel, convened a meeting in his library; there, he suggested that U. S. Steel purchase the stock of an insolvent Wall Street brokerage firm, Moore and Schley, which had secured huge loans against 6 million TCI shares. This was not an entirely selfish gesture, as Morgan recognised that the failure of Moore and Schley would send investor confidence in the markets into a nose-dive. E. H. Gary, president of U. S. Steel, agreed in principle to this transaction, yet argued that without careful political maneuvering the deal would be seen by Congress as an effort to create a monopoly and thereby encounter troublesome federal anti-trust litigation. Morgan himself had been burnt by crusading Washington trust-busters in 1902 when his Northern Securities Company had been forcibly broken up by the government in a landmark test case.

In response to his concerns, Morgan sent Gary on an urgent mission to Washington that Sunday, so that the deal might be vetted by President Theodore Roosevelt himself before the stock exchange opened the next day. Convinced by Gary that U. S. Steel only wished to purchase Moore and Schley's stock in order to inject liquidity into the firm and thereby shore up investor confidence in the wider economy, Roosevelt granted the transaction antitrust immunity in November 1907, a decision for which he was later derided by critics as a hypocrite. Indeed, in 1911 the federal government sought to undo what it perceived to be Roosevelt's mistake and (without success) sued U. S. Steel. In the meantime, Moore and Schley was saved from collapse, the panic soon subsided and U. S. Steel was rewarded with a valuable prize – a controlling stake in TCI. U. S. Steel immediately replaced the Tennessee Coal, Iron and Railroad Company on the Dow Jones Index, where it remained until 1991.

=== U. S. Steel ===
Ensley iron furnaces, 1908

TCI was not fully incorporated into U. S. Steel, and continued to operate as an extremely profitable subsidiary of its parent company well into the 20th century. Immediately following the merger, a venture was launched to create a new, larger TCI plant to the west of Ensley and at the center of a new company town, and so in 1910 work on the planned community of Corey, Alabama, began.

Corey was soon renamed Fairfield, and the steel works there opened in 1917. With the discovery of new coking coal and ore deposits in the region, and with the aid of U. S. Steel's enormous capital, the Fairfield works were quickly expanded with the construction of new steel mills and rail links. Several rolling mills were completed in 1917, which produced ship materials for the nearby shipbuilding plants in Chickasaw, Alabama, in support of America's sudden entry into World War I. In 1920, a direct rail line between Fairfield and Birmingport (the new port of Birmingham, on the Warrior River) was opened. This was followed by the completion of the 'High Ore Line Railroad', which connected the Red Mountain and the Fairfield works; trains literally rolled down the hill from mine to mill. In 1923 a merchant steel mill was completed, followed by the opening of a sheet products mill in 1926.

TCI proved to be so efficient at making cheap steel that a post-merger internal tariff (the 'Pittsburgh Tariff') was levied by U. S. Steel from 1909 on all steel coming out of the Birmingham region. This was an effort to negate the competitive edge of Birmingham steel over U.S. Steel's own Pittsburgh product.

TCI's independence as a separate legal entity from its parent corporation ended in 1952, a century after the founding of the Sewanee Furnace Company, when it became the Tennessee Coal & Iron Division of U. S. Steel. The memory of the historic importance of TCI was not lost when a short book to celebrate the Tennessee Company's centenary was published by U. S. Steel in 1960: Biography of a Business. Stagnation and decline began in 1962 when a majority of the mines in the Birmingham region were closed as domestic ores and coal were superseded by cheaper foreign products, especially from Venezuela. The 1970s and 80s brought about a downsizing and eventual consolidation of the Fairfield and Ensley works, mirroring the general decline of heavy industry in the US throughout those decades.

== Current operations ==
The last relic of the Tennessee Coal, Iron and Railroad Company, the Fairfield Plant, continues to be operated by U. S. Steel as one of its five integrated steel mills in the US. It is the largest steel-making plant in Alabama, employing 2,000 workers as of September 2006, down from a peak of 45,000 during World War II. With a single blast furnace and three basic oxygen process furnaces, amongst other various mills and production facilities, the plant produces 2.4 million tons of raw steel per annum and 640,000 tons of seamless tubular and sheet products, mainly for purchase by the booming oil industry.

On August 17, 2015, U. S. Steel President and CEO Mario Longhi announced, "We have determined that the permanent shut-down of the Fairfield Works blast furnace, steelmaking and most of the finishing operations is necessary." The decision does not impact Fairfield Tubular Operations or the electric arc furnace (EAF) construction project. By November 17, 2015 layoffs had impacted 1,600 workers. On March 18, 2016, it was announced that the Fairfield Tubular Operations were to be temporarily idled, with a further 320 employees laid off. The blast furnaces at Fairfield Works were demolished in October 2017.

== See also ==
- Birmingham District
