= Red Mountain (Birmingham) =

Mountain ridge near Birmingham, Alabama, U.S.

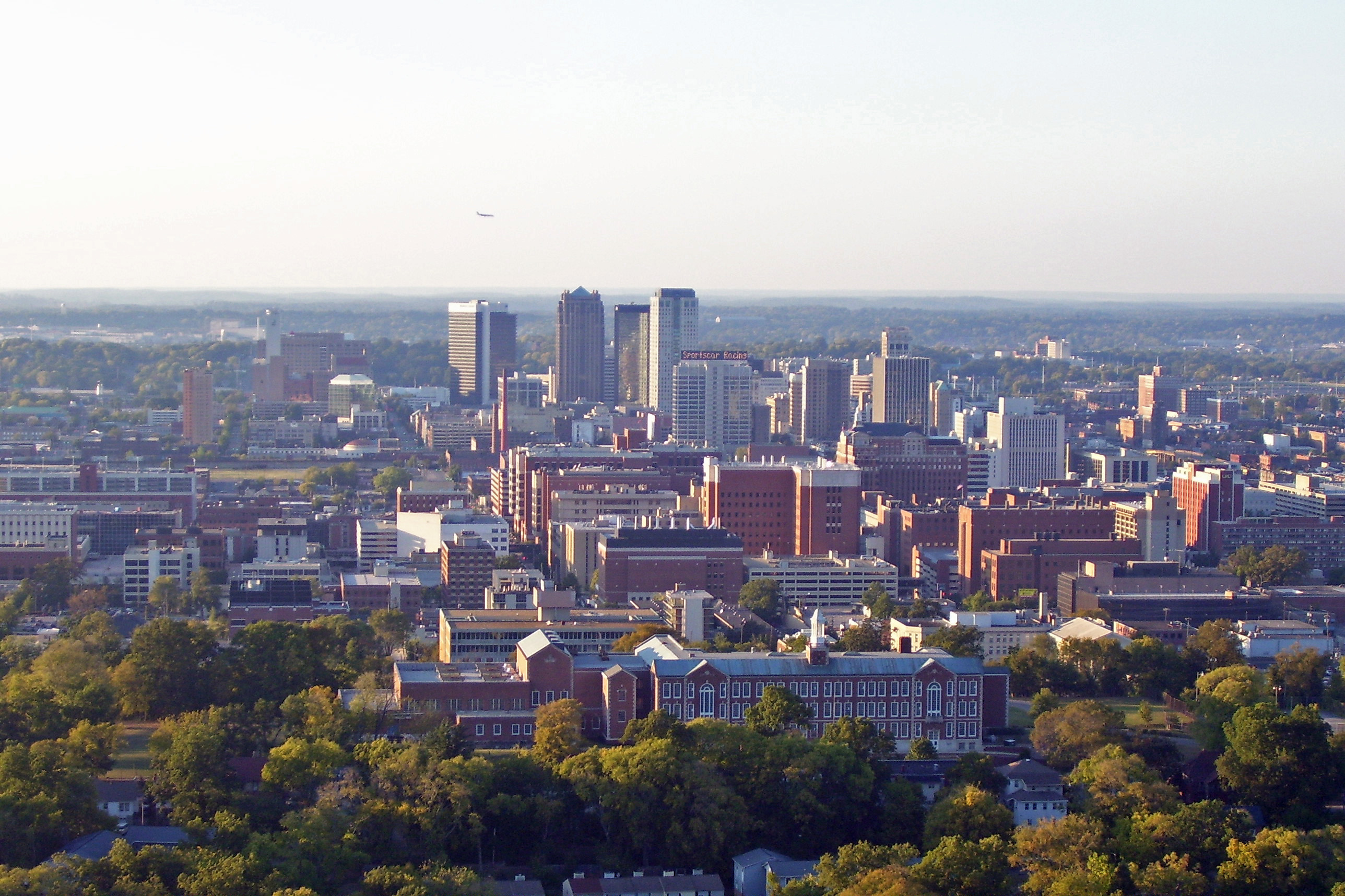
- Birmingham as viewed from the highest point along Red Mountain.

Highest point
- Elevation: 1,025 ft (312 m)
- Coordinates: 33°29′12″N 86°48′23″W

Geography
- Location within Alabama
- Location: Jefferson County, Alabama, U.S.
- Parent range: Cahaba Ridges
- Topo map: USGS Birmingham South

Climbing
- Easiest route: Hike

Red Mountain is a long ridge running southwest-northeast and dividing Jones Valley from Shades Valley south of Birmingham, Alabama. It is part of the Ridge-and-Valley region of the Appalachian Mountains. The Red Mountain Formation of hard Silurian rock strata lies exposed in several long crests, and was named "Red Mountain" because of the rust-stained rock faces and prominent seams of red hematite iron ore. The mountain was the site of several mines that supplied iron ore to Birmingham's iron furnaces. Most of Birmingham's television and radio stations have transmission towers located on Red Mountain.

Red Mountain is also home to Red Mountain Park, one of the largest urban parks in the United States at 1,500 acres (6.1 km^{2}).

== History ==
The proximity of Red Mountain's ore to nearby sources of coal and limestone was the impetus to develop and promote the Birmingham District as an industrial site. The mining of iron ore along Red Mountain began in the early 1860s as the Civil War created a demand for iron necessary to sustain the Confederate war efforts. The Union army destroyed the Oxmoor, Irondale and Tannehill furnaces in 1865 and at this point mining stopped along Red Mountain. After the Civil War the production of iron was again being renewed but this time on a commercial level. Under the leadership of such men as Debardeleben, Sloss, and Woodward the mining of iron ore along Red Mountain began again. The mountain developed a symbolic place as the source of wealth in the region and was even portrayed as a character in pageants sponsored by the steel companies in their company towns. In the Altamont and Redmont areas the abandoned mine sites served as the locations for large estates and upper-class developments which offered cool breezes and a panoramic view of the growing industrial city from above the constant layer of thick black smoke. Alex Harvey "Rick" Woodward's home is in this area along Altamont Road. His home is now owned and maintained by the University of Alabama at Birmingham and used as the residence of the University president.

As the steel furnaces modernized, labor cost rose, and geological faults in the local ore mines made the ore harder to reach, it became more economical to purchase pelletized ore from distant sources than to continue mining ore from Red Mountain. The last ore mine on Red Mountain closed in 1962 and was operated by US Steel. The last ore mine in the Birmingham district closed in 1972. It was the Pyne Mine off Highway 150 near Bessemer and was operated by the Woodward Iron Company.

In 1938, the giant cast-iron statue of the Roman god of the forge, Vulcan, which represented Birmingham in the 1904 St. Louis World's Fair was put on display atop a sandstone tower built by the Works Progress Administration. This is the world's largest cast-iron statue.

Red Mountain serves as a natural promontory for Birmingham's radio and television broadcast stations, and a setting for noteworthy private restaurant "The Club."

=== Red Mountain Expressway Cut ===
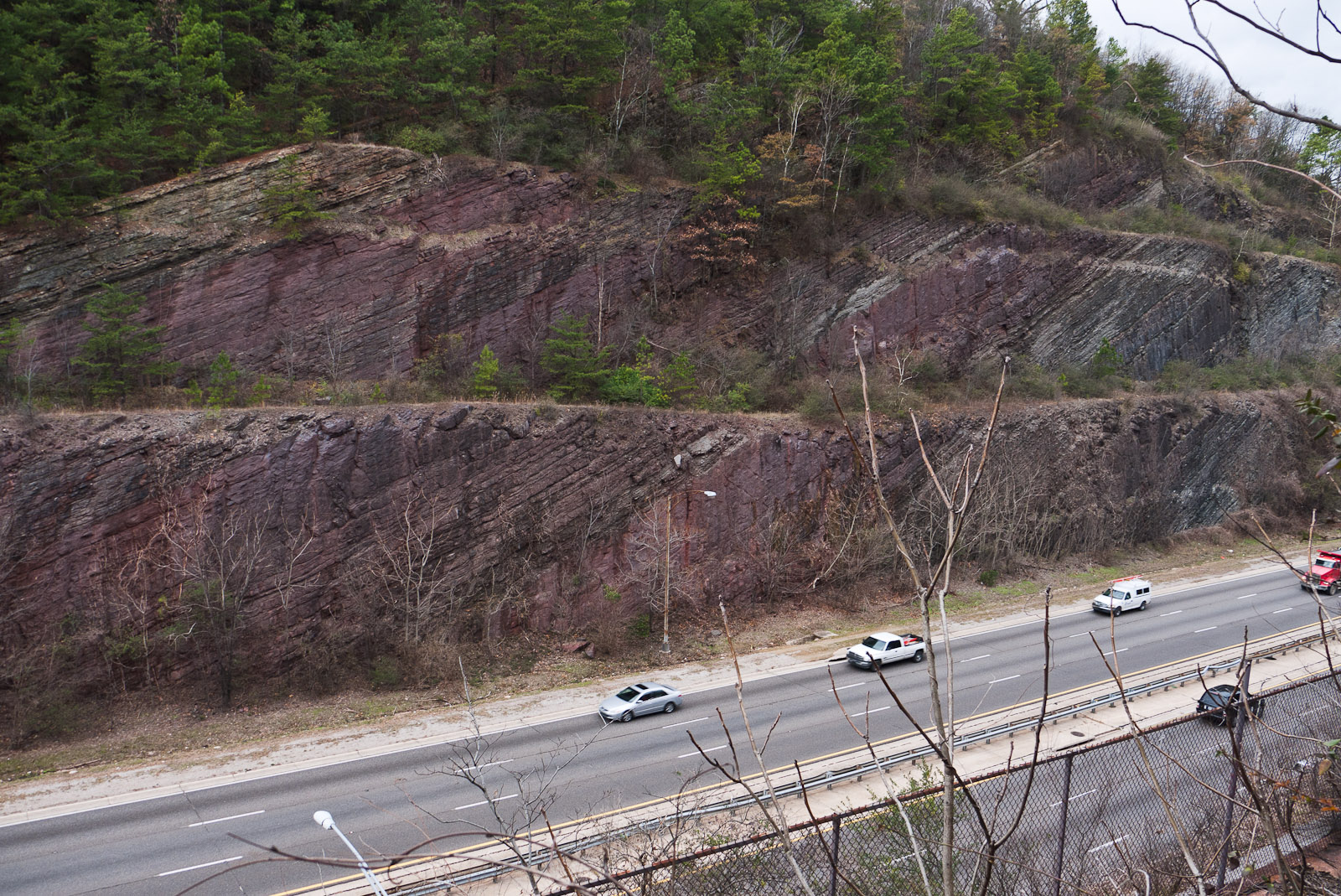
a portion of the Red Mountain Cut

In 1970, the "Red Mountain Expressway" was completed after many years of work cutting through Red Mountain. This highway linked Birmingham with its southern suburbs and spurred suburban growth towards the south of Birmingham. The resultant cut exposed geological strata spanning millions of years, including the red ore seam that spurred Birmingham's development. A new species of Lower Silurian (middle Llandovery) phacopsid trilobite, Acaste birminghamensis, was first collected from exposures on Red Mountain

== Neighborhood ==
There are many neighborhoods that are located along the 33 miles of Red Mountain, that stretches from Sparks Gap on the southwest to Trussville in the northeast. Some of these are Raimund, Muscoda, Lipscomb, Wenonah, Ishkooda, Greensprings, Irondale, Ruffner, and Trussville. Located just southeast of downtown Birmingham, on Red Mountain, is Redmont Park, which was developed in the 1920s by Robert Jemison. It was the home to Birmingham's early bankers and iron and steel industrialists. It became one of Birmingham's most prominent neighborhoods, home to the majority of the multimillion-dollar residences and estates that are located within the city proper. The prestigious Altamont School, a private school well known for its arts and science programs, is located in the neighborhood, as well as Saint Rose Academy, a Catholic parochial school run by Dominican sisters.

== Red Mountain Museum ==
A science museum, the Red Mountain Museum, was opened on the slope adjacent to the cut in 1971. Interpretive signage was installed along one of the terraces of the cut and guardrails and fencing installed to allow museum visitors to inspect the exposed rock close-up. From the late 1970s until 1994, the Red Mountain Museum was quite active in paleontological research, collecting fossil vertebrates and invertebrates from hundreds of localities throughout the state. The staff collected and cataloged tens of thousands of fossils, including many Cretaceous mosasaurs, Pleistocene ground sloths, and primitive Eocene archaeocete whales. Paleontologists, zoologists, geologists and archeologists once employed at the Red Mountain Museum, either as paid staff or as volunteers, include its first curator Whitman Cross, Gorden L. Bell, Jr., James P. Lamb, Winston C. Lancaster, Caitlín R. Kiernan, Susan Henson, and Amy Sheldon.

The Red Mountain Museum later formed a partnership with a nearby children's science museum, The Discovery Place, to form "Discovery 2000", which then moved away from Red Mountain to downtown Birmingham and became the McWane Science Center which opened on July 11, 1998. In 1987 the Red Mountain Expressway Cut was granted National Natural Landmark status by the National Park Service. Deemed unsafe because of the potential for rock slides, the interpretive trail has since been closed to the public. The extensive Red Mountain Museum collection is now stored at the McWane Science Center and once again available to scientists. As of October 2007, the former Red Mountain Museum building had been demolished, but plans for the site are unknown.

== Literary allusions ==
The fantasy writer and paleontologist Caitlín R. Kiernan has used Red Mountain, particularly the area west of U.S. Route 31 and the Red Mountain cut, as the setting for four of her novels – Silk (1998), Threshold (2001), Low Red Moon (2003), and, to a much lesser extent, Murder of Angels (2004). The geography and geology of the mountain was integral to the plot of Threshold, and in a chapbook on the novel (Trilobite: The Writing of Threshold; Subterranean Press, 2003), Kiernan includes an afterword describing the geological history and paleontology of the Paleozoic strata of Red Mountain.

Fannie Flagg's 2010 novel I Still Dream About You features Red Mountain prominently.
