= List of private security companies =

This is a list of notable private security companies.

== Africa ==
=== Angola ===
- Alfa 5
- Teleservice

=== Nigeria ===
- Halogen Group Nigeria

=== South Africa ===
- Bidvest Protea Coin
- Fidelity ADT

== Oceania ==
=== Australia ===
- Paladin Group (private military contractor)
- Wilson Security

== Asia ==
=== India ===
- Security & Intelligence Services Pvt Ltd
- GMR RAXA
- Reliance Global Corporate Security

=== Israel ===
- Mikud

=== Japan ===
- Secom

== Europe ==
=== Denmark ===
- ISS A/S

=== Ireland ===
- Integrated Risk Management Services

=== Spain ===
- Prosegur

=== Sweden ===
- Securitas AB

=== Switzerland ===
- ImmuniWeb
- Securitas AG

=== United Kingdom ===
- Aegis Defense Services
- Control Risks
- Corps of Commissionaires
- G4S
- International Intelligence Limited
- Intelligent (UK Holdings) Limited
- Mitie
- Rubicon International Services

== Americas ==
=== Canada ===
- GardaWorld
- Canadian Corps of Commissionaires

=== United States ===
- ADT Security Services
- Allied Universal
- G4S Secure Solutions
- Inter-Con Security
- Monitronics
- Paragon Systems
- Pinkerton
- Vivint
- Blackwater
- American International Security Corp

== See also ==
- List of private military companies
- List of non-governmental paramilitary organizations
- List of state-owned security companies
- Computer security companies (category)
