= Alfa 5 =

Private security company in Angola

Alfa 5 Segurança Industrial e Patrimonial SARL
- Industry: Private security
- Founded: 1993; 33 years ago
- Headquarters: Rua da Missão, n.º 74, Kinaxixi - Caixa, Luanda, Angola
- Area served: Luanda Province; Lunda Norte Province; Lunda Sul Province; Malanje Province; Moxico Province
- Key people: Francisco Borges Guerra (general director); António Pedro Bartolomeu (head of commercial development)
- Revenue: US$18 million (2008)
- Owner: ENDIAMA
- Number of employees: Over 2000 (2000)

Alfa 5 Segurança Industrial e Patrimonial SARL is a private security company in Angola. It is majority owned by ENDIAMA and holds over half of the security contracts with Angolan diamond companies.

== History ==
Alfa 5 was founded in 1993 in partnership with senior or retired military officials or their close relatives for the purpose of providing security to ENDIAMA's diamond mines against criminals and UNITA rebels. These military and ex-military officials on the Alfa-5 board included then-General César Pugliese, Rui Carlos Sousa Gaio, the wife of then-FAA chief-of-staff General Agostinho Fernandes Nelumba, and the brother of former FAA chief-of-staff General João de Matos. The name refers to five Portuguese-speaking African countries where its namers hoped it would eventually operate.

Since its founding, Alfa 5 developed into a security company of its own, offering services to firms outside of ENDIAMA as well. By the late 90s, Alfa 5 was one of the largest security firms in Angola alongside Teleservice and K&P Mineira.

In 2021, ENDIAMA began looking to sell Alfa 5, but struggled to find a buyer.

=== Human rights abuses ===
In the early 2000s, employees of Alfa 5 were accused of multiple human rights abuses including unlawful killings of protesters, striking miners, and garimpeiros in places such as Luremo and Cuango, and of flexing connections to the military leaders on the Alfa 5 board to avoid consequences.

In response to this, General Director of Alfa 5 Francisco Borges Guerra said that Alfa 5's "operations are decentralized", that its leadership did not give such orders, and that "if the individuals should adopt that behavior, it is on their individual conscience. It is what happens a little in those areas. ... I don't believe that this behavior is generalized among our men, but I do not want to overlook those individual cases which could blemish the company's good name. We do have some sad examples."

In 2023, Alfa 5's Head of Commercial Development, António Pedro Bartolomeu, told O País reporters that Alfa 5 would like to hire ex-police and ex-military personnel to ensure better discipline, but there aren't enough available.

== Services ==
Alfa 5 focuses on combining human security and electronic systems. It offers security for industrial sites and information centers, transportation of valuable cargo, demining, and security systems including alarms, armored doors, and safe deposit boxes.

== Clients ==
Alfa 5 reportedly has clients such as:

- Empresa Nacional de Diamantes E.P. (ENDIAMA)
- Sociedade de Desenvolvimento Mineiro de Angola (SDM)
- Ministry of Finance (MINFIN)
- Administração Geral Tributária (AGT)
- National Bank of Angola (BNA)
- Clínica Sagrada Esperança (CSE)

== See also ==
- List of private security companies
- Private military company
