= SODIAM =

State-run Angolan company

Sociedade de Comercializacao de Diamantes de Angola, SARL
- Type: State-owned
- Industry: Diamond trading
- Founded: November 1999; 26 years ago
- Headquarters: Rua Rainha Ginga, Predio De Beers, No. 87, 7th Fl., Luanda, Angola
- Key people: Eugene Pereira Bravo da Rosa (Chairman of the Board of Directors); Fernando Amaral (Executive Administrator); Jose Neves Goncalves Silva (Executive Administrator)
- Revenue: US$1,626,644,590 (2021)
- Owner: ENDIAMA

The Sociedade de Comercialização de Diamantes (Abbreviated SODIAM), in English the Diamond Trading Society, is the national diamond trading company of Angola. It is owned in part by ENDIAMA and exists to bring diamonds produced both through ENDIAMA's partnered mines and by artisanal miners to national and international markets.

== History ==
SODIAM was founded in November 1999 as a subsidiary of the state-owned diamond mining company ENDIAMA for the purpose of regulating and certifying diamond sales and exports. During the Angolan Civil War, rebel groups such as the National Union for the Total Independence of Angola (UNITA) were in control of much of the countryside, including many of Angola's most valuable diamond mining areas. These rebel groups financed their war in large part by bartering diamonds mined from these territories in exchange for weapons. In response to attacks by UNITA on civilians and United Nations personnel, the United Nations Security Council placed sanctions on UNITA, which included an embargo on diamonds from the country except for those certified authentic by the recognized government in Luanda.

To facilitate this, SODIAM created a subsidiary, the Angola Selling Corporation (ASCORP), which was 51% owned by SODIAM, with the other 49% held predominantly by Belgium-based Omega Diamonds and the international Lev Leviev Group, to serve as the single export channel for Angolan rough diamond production. All other diamond exporters had their licenses revoked. ASCORP's own license expired in 2004, with its role of marketing and exporting diamonds returning to SODIAM.

In 2017, SODIAM divested its shares of Swiss jewelry chain De Grisogono "for reasons of public interest and legality." At the time, De Grisogono was, according to a 2020 report known as the Luanda Leaks by the International Consortium of Investigative Journalists, controlled by Sindika Dokolo, the husband of billionaire Isabel dos Santos, who was the daughter of former President José Eduardo dos Santos and the head of Sonangol prior to her removal from that position by President João Lourenço. Isabel dos Santos had also been a shareholder in ASCORP, and had reportedly been funneling diamonds out of Angola for her personal enrichment. She is wanted by Angolan authorities for corruption and barred from entering the United States for the same reason.

In 2023, SODIAM exported 9.9 million carats of rough diamonds.

== Operations ==
SODIAM is a complex operation with numerous subdivisions both nationally and internationally. These include:

- SODIAM's corporate headquarters in Luanda
- Polo de Desenvolvimento Diamantífero de Saurimo (PDDS), a logistics operation in Saurimo focusing on streamlining diamond production and the supply chain
- Centro de Treinamento em Avaliação e Lapidação de Diamantes (CEFOLAD), a professional training facility in Saurimo
- Offices in Antwerp, Belgium under subsidiary SODIAM Antwerp BVBA
- Offices in Israel, Dubai, Shanghai, and Macau

== See also ==
- ENDIAMA
