= ENDIAMA =

State-run Angolan company

ENDIAMA E.P.
- Type: E.P. Empresa Pública
- Industry: Mining
- Predecessor: Diamang
- Founded: January 15, 1981; 45 years ago
- Headquarters: Rua Major Kanhangulo nº 100 Luanda, Angola
- Key people: Dr José Manuel Augusto Ganga Júnior, President
- Products: Diamonds
- Revenue: 1.3 billion euro in 2023
- Website: http://www.endiama.co.ao/contactos.php

ENDIAMA E.P. (Empresa Nacional de Diamantes E.P.) is the state-run national diamond company of Angola. It is the exclusive concessionary of mining rights in the domain of rough diamonds in Angola.

== History ==
One of the first acts of post-colonial government of the newly independent Angola, led by the People's Movement for the Liberation of Angola (MPLA) based in Luanda, was to nationalize the assets of the largely foreign investor-owned Companhia de Diamantes de Angola (Diamang), under the philosophy that the diamonds of the ground were the property of all Angolans. ENDIAMA was created as a state-run company to manage diamond mining in Angola in 1981. Diamang was then formally disbanded in 1988.

The biggest obstacle to operations by the newly minted ENDIAMA was the fact that Angola was embroiled in the Angolan Civil War, and rebel groups such as the National Union for the Total Independence of Angola (UNITA) held much of Angola's valuable mining areas, such as the Kwango River basin, from which they mined diamonds to barter for weapons and military equipment. During this chaotic time, illegal diamond mining is estimated to have been almost four times the quantity produced legally, and UNITA controlled or operated in up to 70% of the country's land area at points before the eventual end of the war in 2002.

In October 1994, the National Assembly passed Decree-Law no. 16/94, which aimed to open Angola's mining industry up to foreign investment. ENDIAMA was vested all rights regarding the prospecting, mining, sorting and marketing of rough diamonds in Angola, and was enabled to enter into profit-sharing partnerships with third-parties such as Alrosa of Russia, Odebrecht of Brazil, companies owned by Soviet-born Israeli diamond magnate Lev Leviev such as UK-registered Daumonty Financing and Chinese-registered Lev Leviev International, the international diamond conglomerate De Beers, and diamond traders from Belgium, Israel and the United States.

In 1999, ENDIAMA created a new subsidiary, the Sociedade de Comercialização de Diamantes (SODIAM), to which it gave its marketing rights. SODIAM, in turn, created a rough diamond selling subsidiary of itself called Ascorp, of which it held 51% ownership, in partnership with foreign investors. Ascorp's contract ended in July 2004, reverting its rights to SODIAM.

ENDIAMA produced 8.55 million carats of diamonds in 2010 and 8.75 million in 2022, following disruptions from the global COVID-19 pandemic and sanctions against its Russian business partner, Alrosa, resulting from the Russian invasion of Ukraine. However, the company expects to produce 14.5 million carats in 2024 with an eventual goal of 20 million by 2027.

In 2023, Diamantino Azevedo, Minister of Mineral Resources, Oil and Gas, announced that as part of the reform plan of President João Lourenço, ENDIAMA and oil-giant Sonangol would potentially both seek dual listings on local and foreign stock markets, starting with "maybe with five or ten percent" with an eventual goal of 30% private ownership. ENDIAMA had a revenue equaling 1.3 billion euro that year.

== Operations ==
ENDIAMA's primary property is the Sociedade Mineira de Catoca, which is a joint venture between ENDIAMA, Alrosa, and Odebrecht. Catoca is the seventh largest diamond mine in the world, and is estimated to produce over 7 million carats of diamonds in 2014 worth just under $1 billion.

=== Subsidiaries ===
- Sociedade de Comercialização de Diamantes de Angola (SODIAM) diamond purchasing; diamond sales; diamond trade management; company works to combat illegal diamond trade
- ENDIAMA China International Holdings Ltd, a joint venture with Hong Kong-based China International Fund Ltd
- ENDIAMA Prospecção & Produção/ENDIAMA P & P, diamond prospecting and mining
- Fundação Brilhante/FB, social programs; cultural programs
- Clínica Sagrada Esperança/CSE, an 80-bed hospital in Luanda; medical specialties represented include cardiology, neurosurgery, neurology, gynecology, obstetrics, etc etc
- Air Diamantes Angola/ADA - company aviation
- Grupo Desportivo Sagrada Esperança/GDSE - "Sagrada Esperança", a major league football club in Dondo.
- Alfa 5, a private security company which it is currently trying to sell

==== Former Subsidiaries ====
- Sociedade Enditrade; logistics and transport; privatized in 2020
- Hotel Diamante Luanda; privatized in 2020, though still listed as part of ENDIAMA Group on its website

=== Mining operations ===
Endiama has stake in the following mining operations, each of which is a company in its own right:

- Sociedade de Desenvolvimento Mineiro de Angola (SDM), 50% ownership in association with Odebrecht in Brasil.
- Sociedade Mineira do Calonda, 50%
- Sociedade Mineira de Catoca, 41%
- Sociedade Mineira do Chissema, 10%
- Sociedade Mineira do Chitotolo, 35%. Located in Cambulo, Lunda Norte; besides mining, Chitololo is involved in education via its Projecto Educar
- Sociedade Mineira do Cuango, 41%
- Sociedade Mineira do Furi, 20%
- Sociedade Mineira de Kaixepa, 25%
- Sociedade Mineira de Luachimo, 25%
- Sociedade Mineira do Luele, 44.5%
- Sociedade Mineira do Lulo, 32%
- Sociedade Mineira Lunhinga, 30%, formerly the Sociedade Mineira do Camatchia-Camagico, shared with Comica of Angola, Southern Era Resources of Canada, and Minex of Israel until SMCC's mining contract was revoked in 2019 and the Luó mine was reorganized by an Endiama management committee.
- Sociedade Mineira da Luminas, 47%
- Sociedade Mineira do Mucuanza, 33%
- Sociedade Mineira Somiluana, 33%
- Sociedade Mineira do Tchiege, 25%
- Sociedade Mineira Uari
- Sociedade Mineira Yetwene/SMY 50% owned
- Projecto Fucaúma/Fucauma diamond mine, 40% owned in association with Trans Hex and others;
- Projecto Luarica/Luarica diamond mine, 38% owned in association with Transhex, Micol and others
- Luele Diamond Mine, 25% owned.

== See also ==
- Conflict diamond
- Diamonds as an investment
- Mining industry of Angola
