= Zogbé =

Zogbe is a surname. Notable people with the surname include:

- Anderson Zogbe (born 1995), Ivorian footballer
- Bibi Zogbé (1890–1973), Lebanese painter
- Luck Zogbé (born 2005), Ivorian footballer
