= Humanitarian Defense =

Humanitarian Defense, Inc
- Company type: Non-Profit Organization, Private Security Company
- Industry: Non-Profit Organization, Non-governmental organization
- Founded: 2008
- Headquarters: Reno, Nevada, United States
- Area served: International
- Number of employees: 10-15
- Parent: Abundance International, Inc. - (501c3)
- Subsidiaries: Center For Expeditionary Security Training–US (CESTUS, Inc.)
- Website: HumanitarianDefense.org

Humanitarian Defence (HD) is a Wyoming registered Non-Profit Organization. Its first major mission was in the aftermath of the 2010 Haiti earthquake.
