= Zoilo Hilario =

Filipino poet, playwright, lawyer, politician and linguist (1892–1963)

The Honorable Zoilo Hilario
- Born: June 27, 1892; San Fernando, Pampanga, Captaincy General of the Philippines
- Died: June 13, 1963 (aged 70); Pampanga, Philippines
- Other name: Justo Fiel
- Education: Liceo de Manila, Escuela de Derecho de Manila
- Occupations: poet, playwright, politician, linguist
- Spouse: Trinidad Vasquez
- Children: 4
- Parent(s): Tiburcio Hilario (father); Adriana Sangalang (mother)
- Writing career
- Language: Spanish, Kapampangan
- Notable works: Adelfas (de la lira filipina), Patria y redención, Bayung Sunis, Himnos y arengas

Member of the House of Representatives of the Philippine Islands from Pampanga's 2nd district
- In office June 2, 1931 – June 5, 1934
- Preceded by: Macario Ocampo
- Succeeded by: José Fausto

Personal details
- Party: Nacionalista Party

Zoilo José Hilario y Sangalang (June 27, 1892 – June 13, 1963) was a Filipino poet, playwright, lawyer, politician and linguist. He is known for his poems written in both the Spanish and Kapampangan. languages, as well as a distinguished researcher of the Kulitan script and Kapampangan orthography.

== Biography ==
=== Early life and education ===
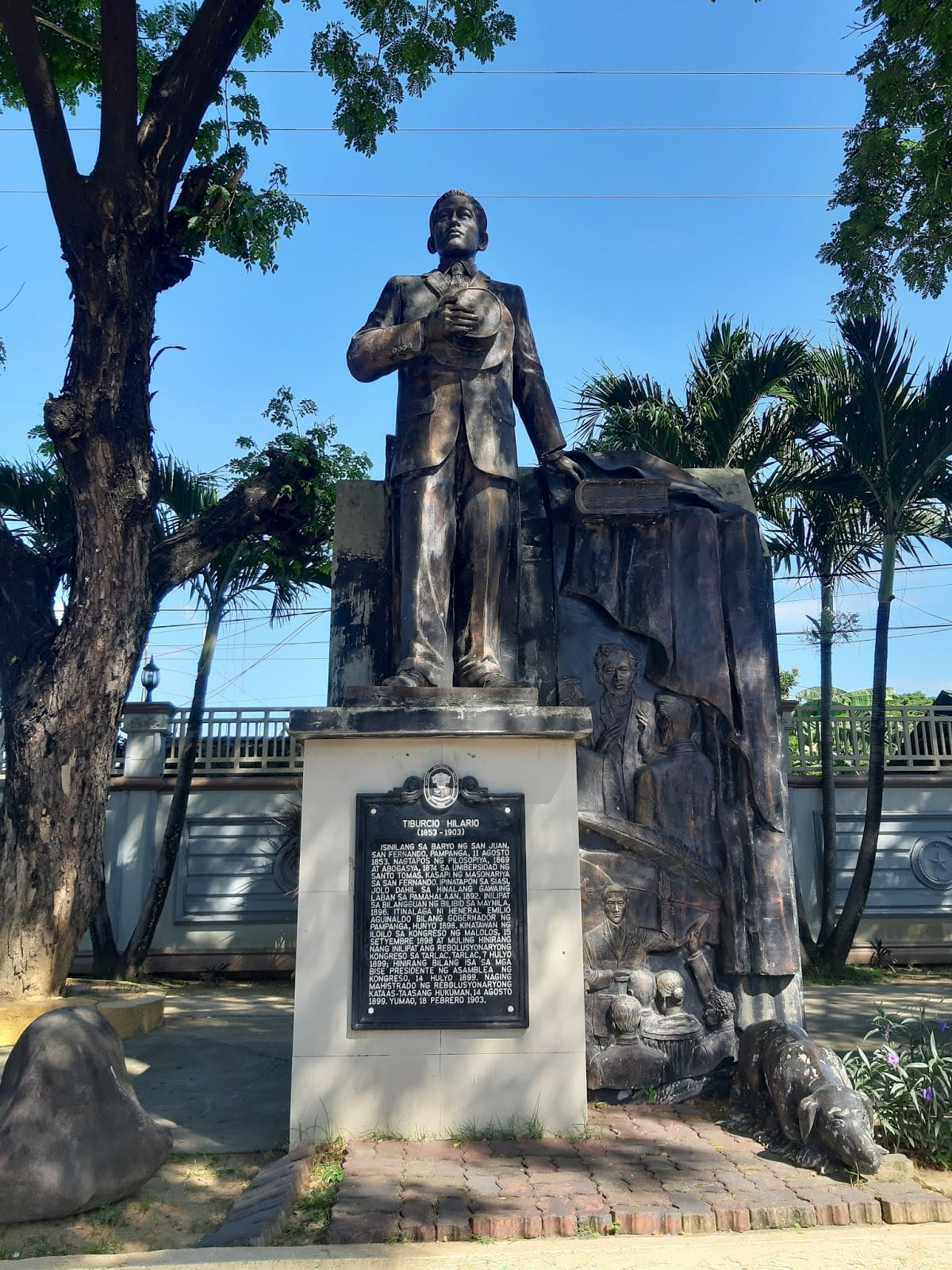
Zoilo's father, Tiburcio Hilario statue and historical marker

Zoilo Hilario was born in San Fernando, Pampanga to parents Tiburcio Hilario and Adriana Sangalang. He learned his cartilla from the school of Modesto Joaquin in Bacolor. He earned his bachiller en artes in the Liceo De Manila and then enrolled for his law course at Escuela de Derecho, where he graduated in 1911 and passed the bar the next year.

=== Literature ===
After finishing his studies, he devoted more time to writing poetry. His first book of poetry in the Spanish language, Adelfas (de la lira filipina), was published in 1913. Another book of Spanish poems, entitled Patria y Redención, was published in 1914. In 1917, he won a contest sponsored by the Casino Español de Iloilo with his poem El Alma Española. He also became an esteemed member of Jardín de Epicuro, an elite literary society founded by Fernando María Guerrero. This organization was founded in the outskirts of Ermita and was fundamental to the invigoration of the modernist style in the Philippines. He then embarked on a career in politics as a member of the Philippine Partido Nacionalista. From 1915 to 1931, he served as the secretary of the Provincial Council of Pampanga.

In 1923, backed and financed by the local members of the Philippine Partido Nacionalista, Zoilo Hilario founded the Central Luzon-based mutual-aid organization for laborers named Katipunan Mipanampun (Mutual Protection Association). Most of its recruits came from the literate provincial middle class – teachers, workers, local politicians and the less impoverished smallholders and tenants in the barrios. Its membership grew rapidly, reaching a claimed 15,700 in less than two years. It also had an auxiliary women's section known as the "Amazonas". Joining the organization required undergoing elaborate masonlike initiation rituals (said to last three days). Known for its promotion of nationalism, the organization encouraged not only the regular conduction of flag ceremonies, but it also encouraged support of the local cottage industries as it required its members during campaigns and town parades to always wear locally made native dresses such as the bamboo hats, the barong Tagalog and the abaca cloth trousers. Lasting until 1924, the Katipunan Mipanampun represented the largest counter-organization against tenant radicalism, providing counter-demonstrations to those of the more radical peasant unions while promoting the ideals of peace and order. As a result, the more radical provincials regarded the Katipunan Mipanampun as a straightforward landlord front organization, although more conservative elements within the provincial Nacionalista circles viewed Zoilo Hilario and his associates with suspicion and charged them with arousing unwarranted expectations as Hilario himself reportedly maintained a progressive stance upon his return to the legislature.

=== Politics ===
In 1931, he was elected as a congressman, representing his province Pampanga. In 1938, he was named as one of the first members of the National Language Institute (or Surian ng Wikang Pambansa in the local Filipino language) by the then president Manuel L. Quezon. He also served as a judge in Ilocos Sur from 1947 to 1954, and rose to become a judge of the Court of the First Instance (juez de primera instancia) from 1954 up to 1960, when he finally retired.

=== Later life ===
After his retirement, he devoted his time to his writings. In 1962, Zoilo Hilario compiled a typewritten book entitled Bayung Sunis (New Rhythm). A chapter of this book was dedicated to Kapampangan orthography, with a section devoted to inform the readers how to read and write the Kapampangan script. He also wrote the following plays in the Kapampangan language: Mumunang Sinta (First Love), Sampagang E Malalanat (Unfading Flower), Bandila ning Filipinas (Flag of the Philippines) and Juan de la Cruz, Anak ning Katipunan (Juan de la Cruz, son of Katipunan).

Even after his retirement, he continued his involvement with the government by being the legal adviser to former president Emilio Aguinaldo. In 1962, he was appointed as a member of the Philippine Historical Commission by then president Diosdado Macapagal. He died in 1963, leaving behind his widow, Trinidad Vasquez of Negros Occidental, and two daughters, Rafaelita and Evangelina. His third book of Spanish poems, Himnos y Arengas, was published posthumously in 1968 by his family and with the collaboration of Joaquín P. Jaramillo as editor of the book and Francisco G. Tonogbanua as its publisher. In 1982, through the efforts of the National Historical Institute and the local government of Pampanga, his bust and a historical marker was unveiled in his hometown San Fernando, as a tribute for his contributions to his province.

== Legacy ==
A street inside the Cultural Center of the Philippines Complex in Pasay City is named in his honor and memory.

=== Poetry in Spanish ===
- Adelfas (de la lira filipina) (1913)
- Patria y Redención (1914)
- Himnos y Arengas (1968)

=== Poetry in Kapampangan ===
- Bayung Sunis (1962, republished in 2015)

=== Kapampangan plays ===
- Mumunang Sinta
- Sampagang E Malalanat
- Bandila ning Filipinas
- Juan de la Cruz, Anak ning Katipunan

== See also ==
- Fernando María Guerrero
- Jesús Balmori
- Cecilio Apostol
- Jose Palma
- Kulitan script
- Philippine literature in Spanish
