= Mikud =

Mikud may refer to:

- Mikud (Bagrut) - the specific material of each matriculation examination in Israel, from the entire material which is taught on that subject.
- Mikud (company) - Israeli security and maintenance company.
