= Webster Geneva Campus =

University in Geneva, Switzerland

Coordinates: 48°15′27″N 06°09′04″E

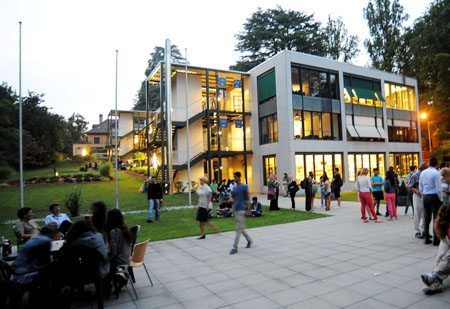
- Type: Private, four-year
- Established: 1978
- Chancellor: Elizabeth (Beth) J. Stroble
- President: Dr. Julian Z. Schuster
- Director: Dr. Ryan Guffey
- Location: Geneva, Switzerland
- Website: https://geneva.webster.edu

Webster Geneva Campus is the Swiss campus of Webster University based in St. Louis, Missouri, United States. Founded in 1979, it is officially registered in Switzerland under Fondation Webster (English - Webster Foundation), the IDE number is CHE-107.950.280. Webster University Geneva was the university's first international campus and currently has approximately 420 students from 90 countries (220 undergraduate, 115 graduate students, and 85 Study Abroad). Webster University operates as an independent, non-denominational university with nearly 100 campus locations around the world.

Dr. Ryan Guffey has been the Director of Webster University Geneva since August 2021, when he also became the Director General for Global Campuses.

== History ==
Webster Geneva Campus was founded in 1978. From 1978 to 1983, the university was housed in the John Knox Center in Grand-Saconnex. In 1983 the university moved to its current location, which at the time included a large house (the current administration building) and 24’000 sq/m of land. Webster University Geneva rented the Bellevue Campus property for three years before obtaining the purchasing permit from the Swiss Government in 1986. After rezoning the land, the campus began the construction of two, three-floor buildings measuring 225 square meters each. The buildings now hold the campus's main classrooms, library, cafeteria, some academic offices, and a recording studio, as well as computer, media, and photography labs. The university then added another building for freshman campus housing, which holds additional classrooms and student services offices, as well as a student lounge and fitness room. Since 2009, Webster University has also rented a residence (Les Berges du Rhône) for student housing. This residence is located in the center of Geneva along the Rhône river.

== Gallery ==
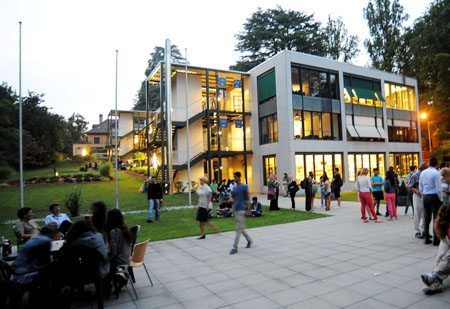

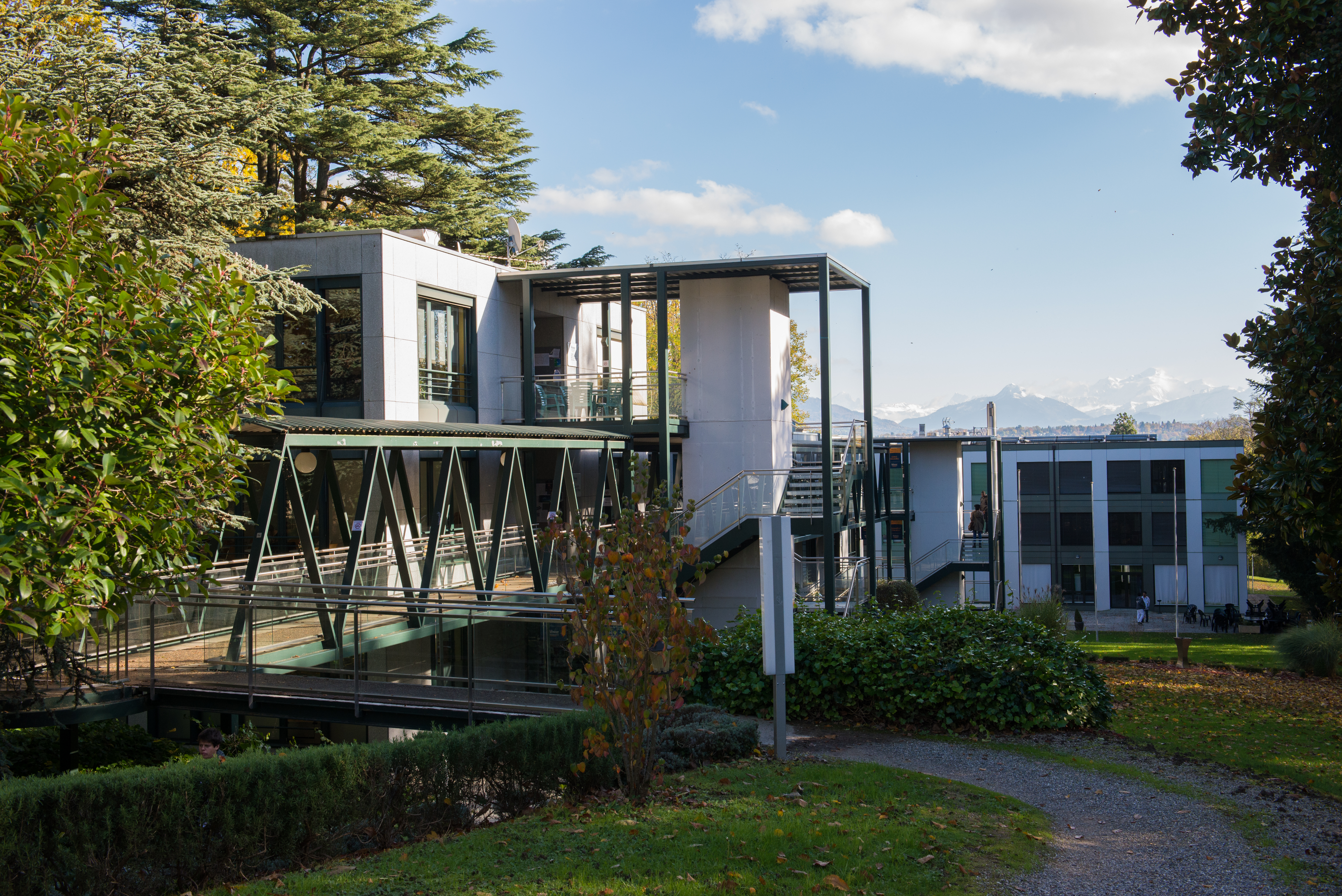

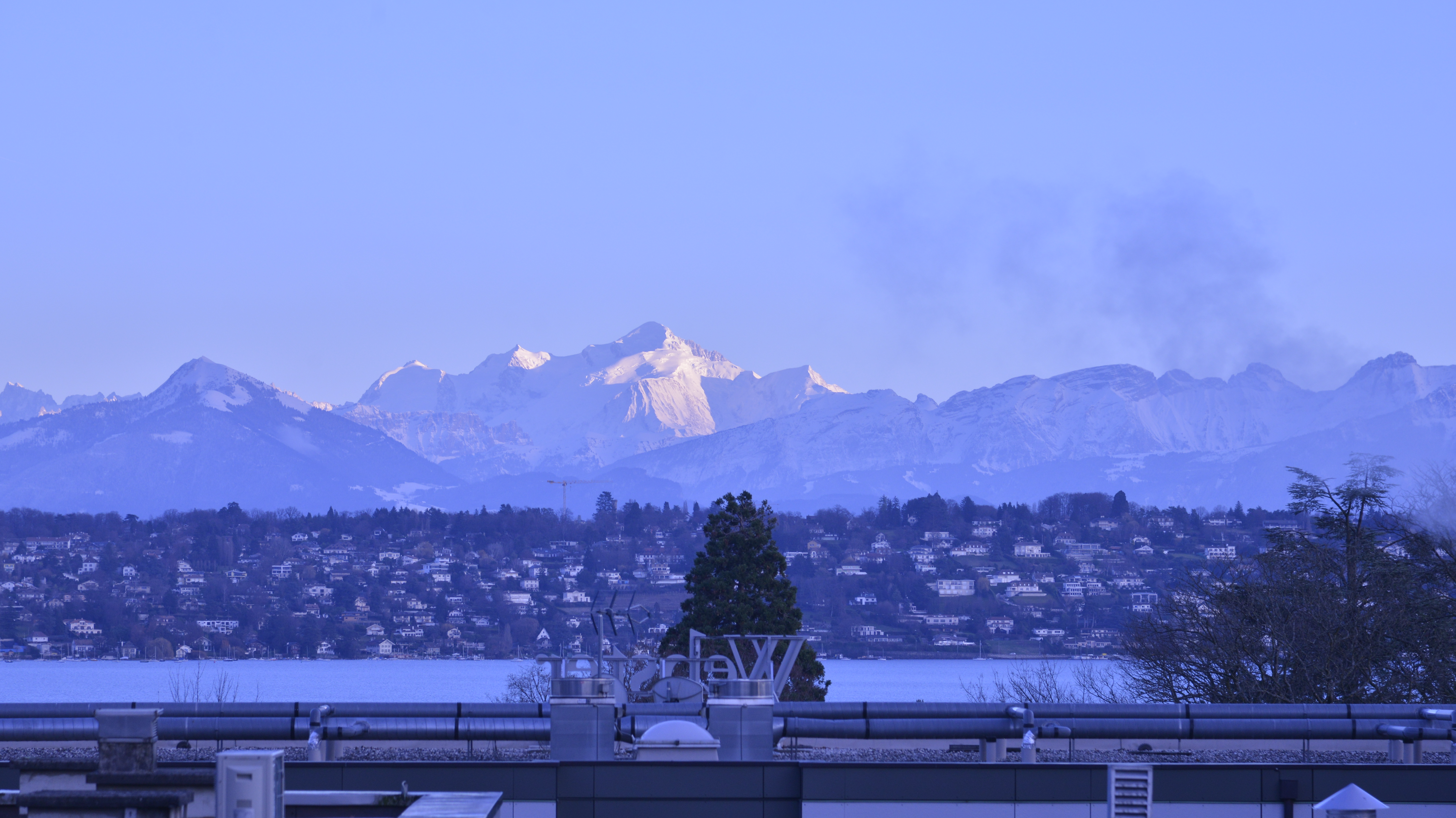

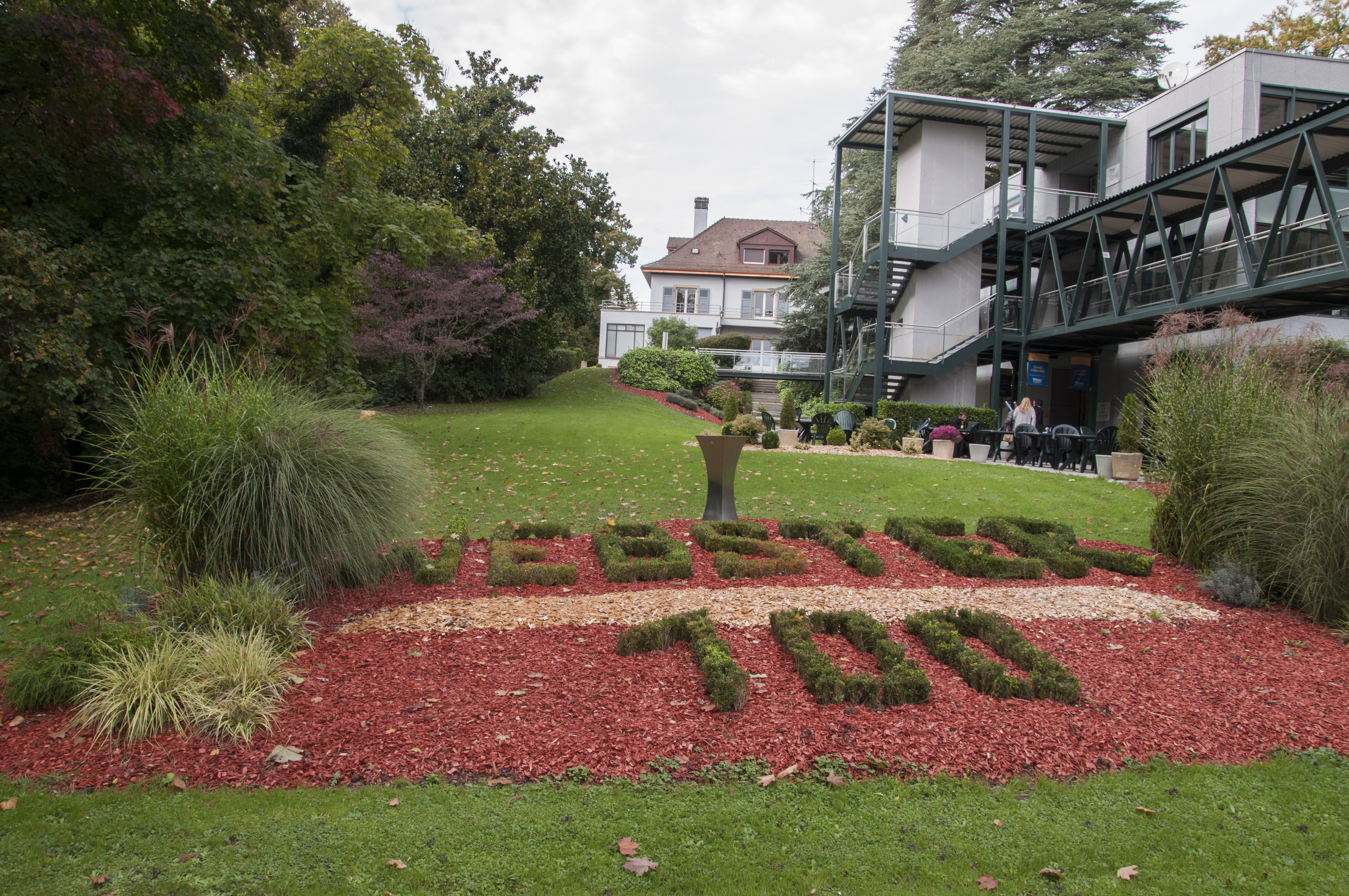

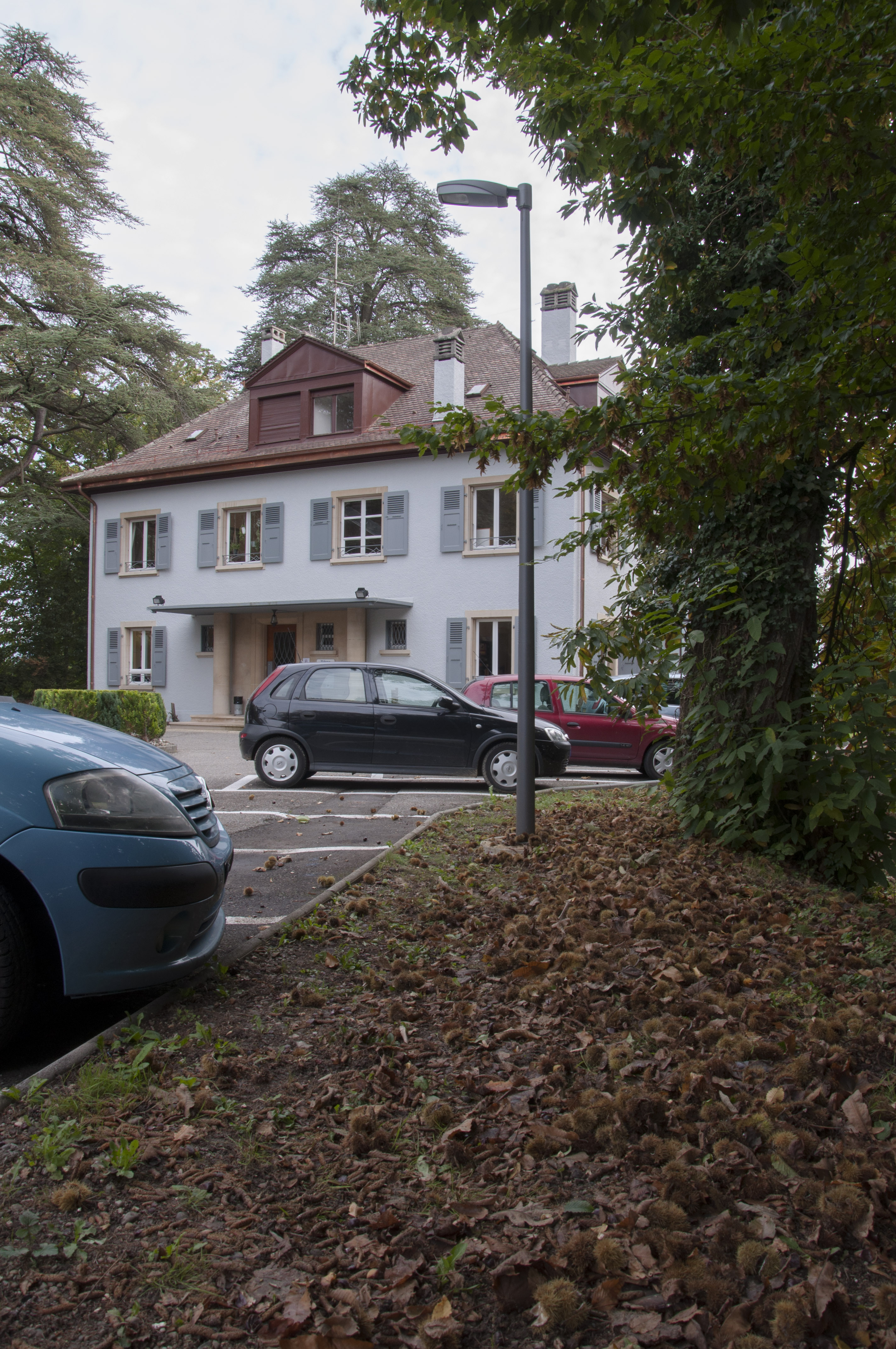

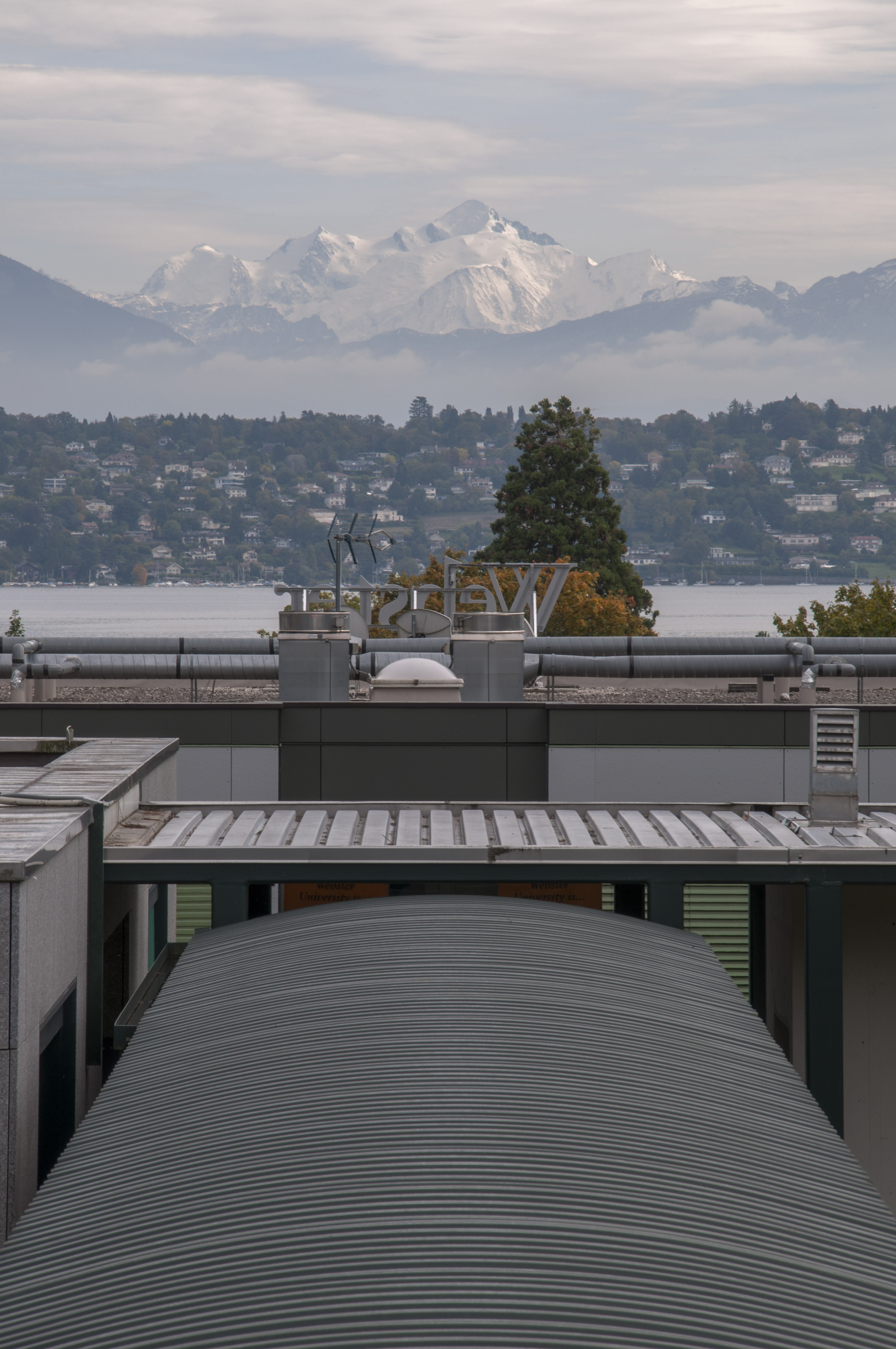

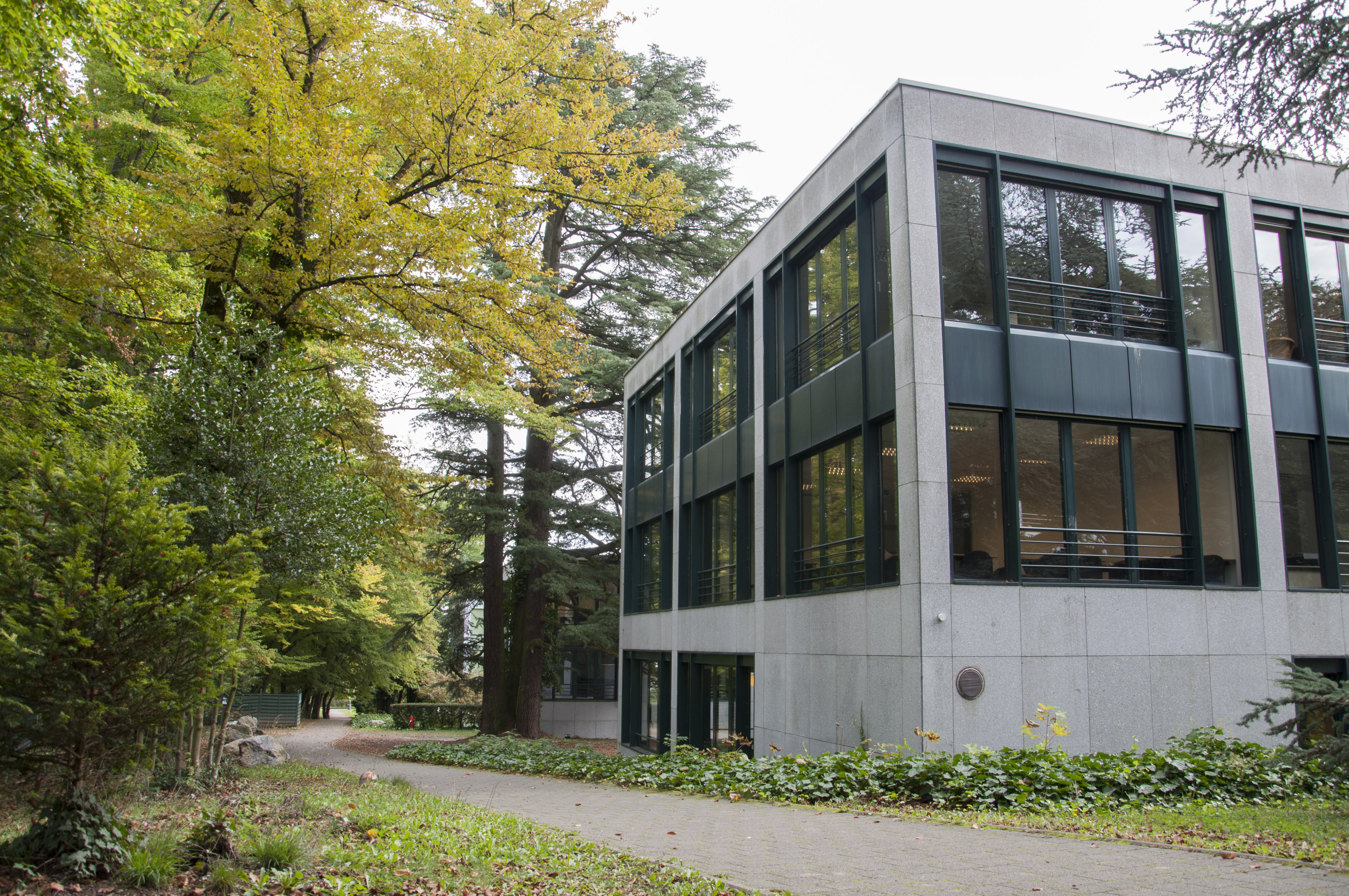

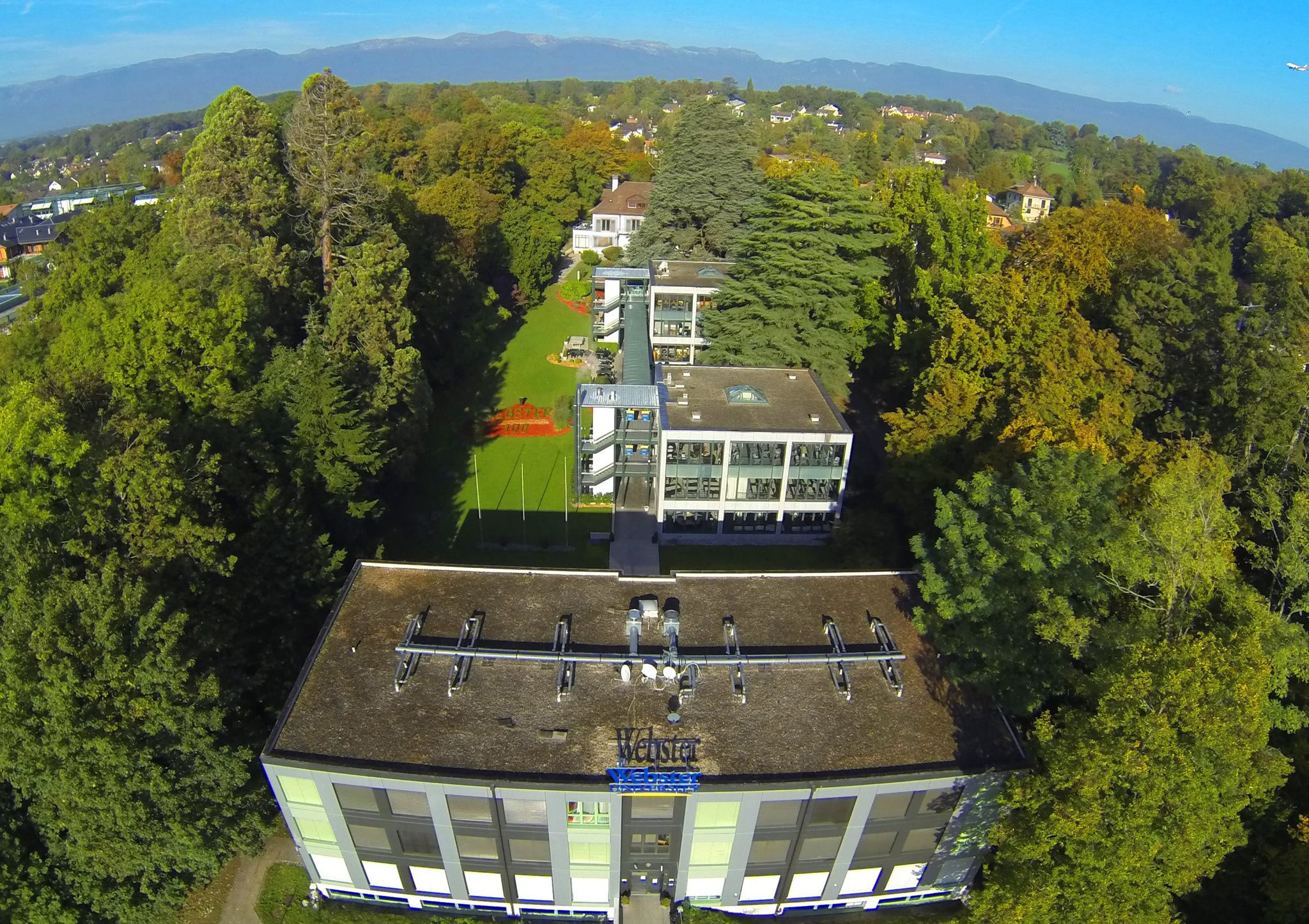

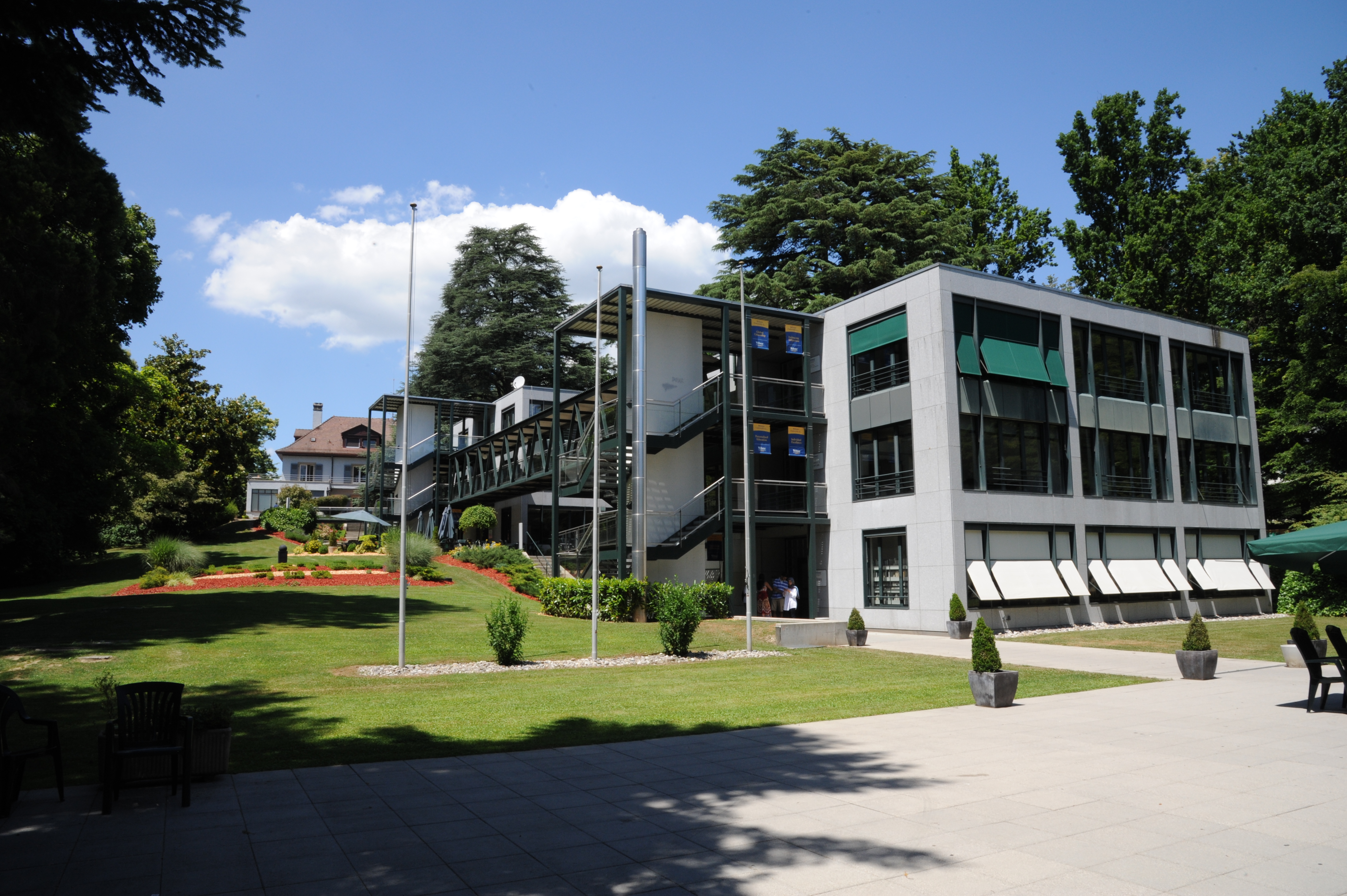

== Accreditation ==
Webster University carries full institutional accreditation from the Higher Learning Commission (HLC). The HLC is the highest-level accrediting agency for universities based in the north-central region of the United States. Webster University has maintained this accreditation since 1925, and this institutional accreditation applies to all locations where the university offers programs, worldwide. Students at Webster University Geneva, therefore, earn the same degree that is awarded in the United States. Webster University Geneva is not an accredited Swiss university, but the Master of Arts in Counselling is fully accredited by the Swiss Association for Counselling

== Academic programs ==
The Geneva Campus offers undergraduate and graduate programs including bachelor's and master's degrees in International Relations, Media Communications, Psychology, Photography, Business Administration, Finance, Computer Science, as well as certificates in International Human Rights, Marketing, Migration & Refugee studies, Website development and design, photojournalism, and "Leadership & Gestion dans le domaine de la Santé" (in French).

== Departmental conferences ==
Since 1996, Webster Geneva has held a series of departmental conferences that are free and open to the public. These conferences are either held on campus or in larger venues in Geneva. The International Relations Department has the longest history with 2023 seeing the 28th International Humanitarian and Security Conference on the theme of 'The Universal Declaration of Human Rights Seventy-Five Years On: Achievements and Current Challenges.'

== Notable alumni ==
- Sandra Mansour, Lebanese fashion designer
- Ilia Kolochenko, founder of ImmuniWeb
