= List of diamond mines =

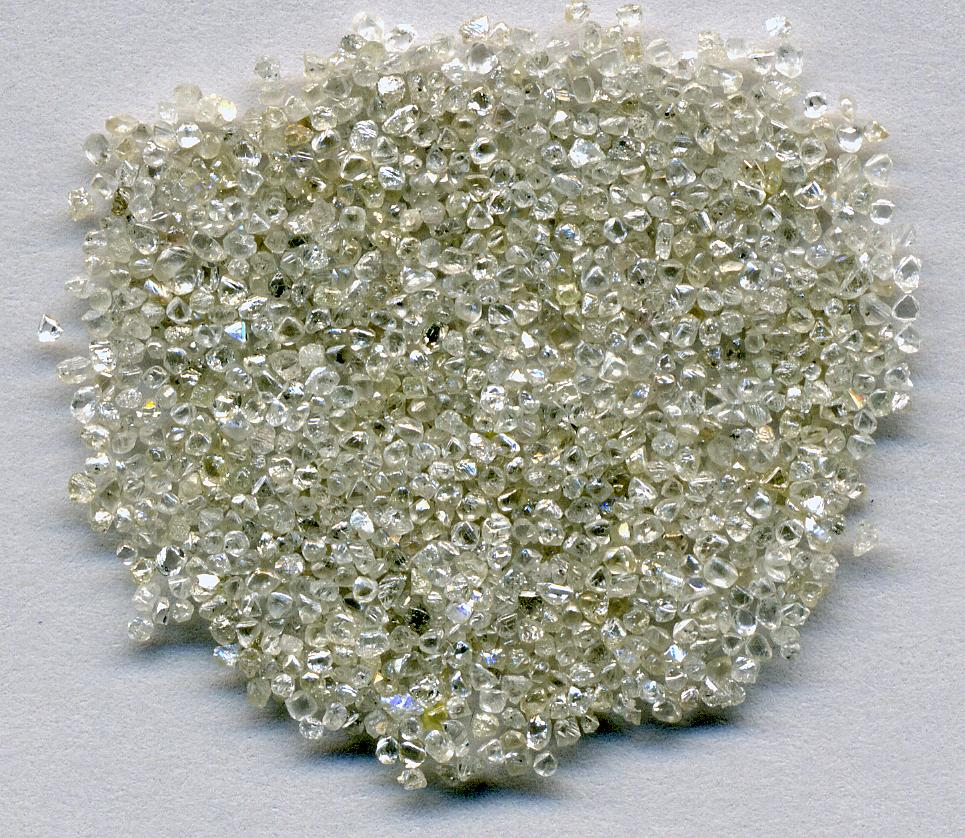
Small rough diamonds from Russia. Crystals are about 0.7 to 0.9 mm in size.

There are a limited number of diamond mines currently operating in the world. Diamonds are also prospected in dispersed alluvial deposits, where diamonds have been eroded out of the ground, deposited, and concentrated by water or weather action. There is also at least one example of a heritage diamond mine (Crater of Diamonds State Park). Due to the increasing competition from artificial diamonds, the majority of mines listed below are not in production.

== Africa ==
=== Angola ===
- Luele Diamond Mine
- Catoca diamond mine
- Fucauma diamond mine
- Luarica diamond mine

=== Botswana ===
- Damtshaa diamond mine
- Jwaneng diamond mine
- Letlhakane diamond mine
- Orapa diamond mine
- Karowe diamond mine
- Lerala diamond mine

=== South Africa ===
- Baken diamond mine
- Cullinan diamond mine (previously "Premier mine")
- Finsch diamond mine
- Kimberley mine
- Koffiefontein mine
- Venetia diamond mine
- Royal Thulare Mine

=== Others ===
- Kao diamond mine, Lesotho
- Baba Diamond Fields, Zimbabwe
- Marange diamond fields, Zimbabwe
- Murowa diamond mine, Zimbabwe
- Williamson diamond mine, Tanzania
- Letseng diamond mine, Lesotho
- Miba, Democratic Republic of the Congo

== Eurasia ==
=== Russia ===
- Mirny GOK
- Udachny GOK
- Jubilee
- Grib
- Aykhal
- Komsomolskaya
- International
- Zarnitsa mine

=== India ===
- Kollur Mine
- Panna

=== Indonesia ===
In South Kalimantan, Borneo:

- Cempaka diamond mine
- Martapura

== Australia ==
- Argyle diamond mine
- Merlin diamond mine
- Ellendale diamond mine

== North America ==
=== Canada ===
- Diavik Diamond Mine, Northwest Territories
- Ekati Diamond Mine, Northwest Territories
- Jericho Diamond Mine, Nunavut
- Snap Lake Diamond Mine, Northwest Territories
- Victor Diamond Mine, Ontario
- Gahcho Kue Diamond Mine Project, Northwest Territories
- Renard Diamond Mine, Quebec

=== United States ===
- Crater of Diamonds State Park, Arkansas (Former mine now a state park)
- Kelsey Lake Diamond Mine, Colorado (Former mine no longer in operation)

== See also ==
- Diamond production by country
- Diamonds as an investment
- List of diamonds
- List of Goods Produced by Child Labor or Forced Labor
- Golconda Diamonds
