= Bibi Zogbé =

Argentinian painter

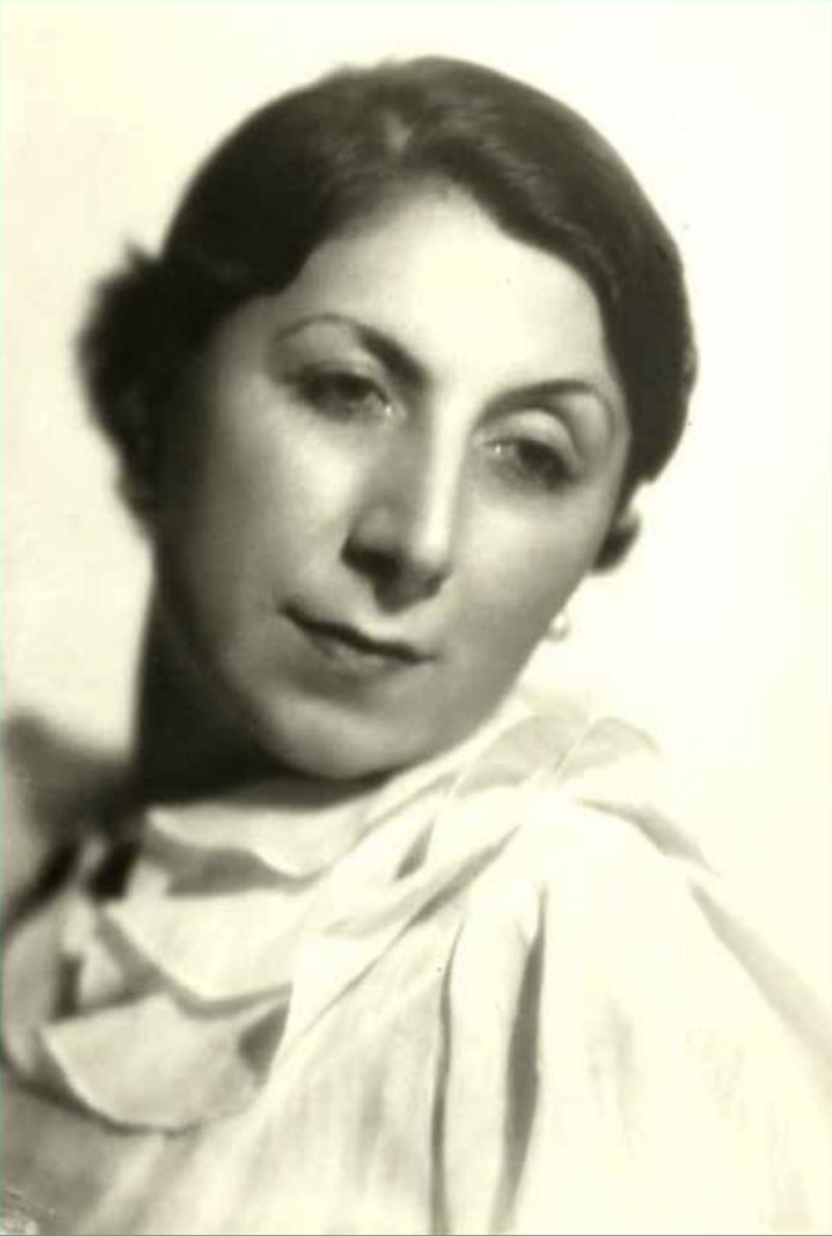
- Born: Labibé Zogbé; 1890; Lebanon
- Died: 1973
- Education: Collège de la Sainte Famille, Beirut
- Movement: Arab modernist art

Bibi Zogbé (1890 – 1973) was a Lebanese-born painter based in Buenos Aires, Argentina best known for her depiction of wild flora. Nicknamed “La Pintora de Flores,” or “the flower painter” in Spanish, she often painted heavily symbolic still lifes as well as portraits. She traveled widely and painted during trips to Dakar, Beirut, and Paris, as well as exhibited her work in Chile, Brazil, Cuba and the United States. Though she received relatively little recognition during her lifetime, she has begun to receive new attention as a figure in the twentieth-century Arab and Lebanese modernist art movements.

== Early life in Lebanon and settlement in Argentina ==
Zogbé was born as Labibé Zogbé in 1890 to a wealthy Lebanese family. She grew up in the small coastal Lebanese town of Sahel Alma. Her father became the ambassador of Lebanon in Argentina, which had welcomed a small but significant population of migrants of Lebanese origin from 1887 onwards. While growing up in Lebanon, Zogbé attended a local Catholic school and later the Sainte Famille College in Beirut, where she received a French education.

In 1906, when Zogbé was sixteen years old, she left Lebanon for a marriage that her parents had arranged for her in Argentina. She married Domingo Samaja, a wealthy Lebanese-Argentinian immigrant. She legally divorced him in the early 1930s and never remarried. Though the marriage did not last, she reportedly cultivated an enduring love of art during the many trips she took with Samaja to Paris.

As an adult, Zogbé settled permanently in Buenos Aires. By this time, Argentina hosted a substantial population of people Lebanese origin – a population that numbered 148,270 people in 1926. Members of this community developed a distinct Lebanese-Argentine cultural identity, even while many retained, like Zogbé, a firm connection to Lebanon.

== Career ==
Zogbé began to exhibit her work in Argentinian galleries starting in the 1930s. Her first solo exhibition occurred in 1934 at the Whitcomb Gallery in Buenos Aires. She later held shows at the Charpentier Gallery in Paris in 1935 and another show in Chile in 1939. She also exhibited in Rio de Janeiro, Brazil and in Uruguay. At the time, Lebanese artwork was heavily influenced by French impressionism, Spanish modernism, and German expressionism. Zogbé drew inspiration from these styles in her oil paintings. She returned to Beirut for an extended stay in 1947, during which time the Lebanese government sponsored articles on three artists including Zogbé, and gained success in the local market. During this period, her art featured in a solo show at the Cénacle Libanais, an esteemed literary salon attended by prominent Lebanese intellectuals.

Zogbé was able to travel frequently because she had resources as well as a lack of family commitments. She did much of her painting while traveling.

== Artistic style and content ==
Zogbé, who painted in the medium of oil, became known in some circles as “La Pintura de Flores,” meaning “the flower painter,” because she so often depicted wild flowers and plants, including cacti, chrysanthemums, hydrangeas, and on at least one occasion, a Japanese apple tree. Although she produced most of her work in Argentina, she focused often on colorful plant life native to Lebanon. She also traveled to West Africa. In addition, Zogbé painted a few figurative paintings such as “Bahias,” showing a mother carrying her son, and “Femme aux Fleurs,” a portrait which pictures a woman surrounded by flowers. The time she spent in Dakar inspired paintings such as “A Village in Senegal.” Zogbé's modernist style contrasted with classical and European styles, and may have reflected the fact her art education was largely self-taught. The art auction house Christies described her style as "avant-garde."

== Reputation and legacy ==
In 1947, Lebanon funded publications about three national artists, and Zogbé was the only woman featured. Later that year, she was awarded the Lebanese Cedar Medallion of Excellence for her artistic efforts. In the twenty-first century, Zogbé began to receive more recognition as a pioneering Lebanese woman artist and painter in the Arab modernist style, with her works prized for their vivid colors and for their "double meanings" or symbolism. In 2022, the Beirut gallery, Galerie Tanit, hosted a new exhibit of her art, while in recent years museums in Lebanon have also put her work on display. Zogbé has also inspired other artists, such as Swiss-born Lebanese fashion designer Sandra Mansour. In 2022, Mansour incorporated some of her floral patterns in her fashion line, Fleur du Soleil, for H&M.
