= Fucauma Diamond Mine =

Diamond mine in Lunda Norte Province, Angola

Coordinates: 7.36593°S 21.19691°E

Fucauma diamond mine
- Interactive map of Fucauma diamond mine
- Location: Lunda Norte Province, Angola
- Products: Diamonds (120,000 carats per annum)
- Opened: 2005
- Company: Endiama (40%); Trans Hex (35%)

The Fucauma Diamond Mine is a diamond mine under construction in the Lunda Norte Province of Angola. The mine is owned by a consortium of diamond mining companies, the two largest holders being Endiama with 40 percent ownership and Trans Hex with 35% ownership.

A feasibility study was done, which included the second phase of bulk sampling and drilling was completed in February 2004. The result of the study was a plan for a US$15 million capital expansion programme, that would lead to a full-scale mining production capacity of 750 000 m3/year that is anticipated to yield 120 120,000 carats (24 kg) in the first year of full-scale mining. Pilot production was underway early in 2005 with full-scale mining expected to begin six months later. The Fucauma mine is expected to produce approximately 480,000 carats (96,000 g) over a four-year period, providing earnings of US$70 million.

Mining operations were suspended in May 2009 due to a decline in diamond demand caused by the Great Recession. Trans Hex announced in August 2011 that it planned to withdraw from its two Angola joint-ventures with Endiama—Fucauma and Luarica—after failing to reach an agreement with the government of Angola (which owns the other major partner, Endiama). Endiama stated that it planned to restart operations alone.
