= International Intelligence =

International Intelligence Limited
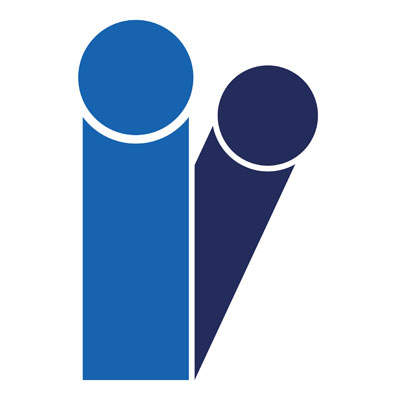
- Type: Subsidiary
- Industry: Technical surveillance counter-measures Counter espionage Competitive intelligence Corporate Investigation; Competitive intelligence counter surveillance intelligence
- Founded: 2002
- Headquarters: Eastington, Stroud, U.K.
- Number of locations: London, U.K.
- Key people: Alex J Bomberg (Group CEO)
- Parent: Intelligent (UK Holdings) Limited
- Website: www.international-intelligence.co.uk

International Intelligence Limited is a United Kingdom based security and intelligence company. Incorporated on 11 July 2002, it is part of the Intelligent (UK Holdings) Limited group of companies that investigates and provides counter espionage services.

== Company overview ==
International Intelligence Limited, a private security- and intelligence-firm, is based in Cheltenham, England. Alex Bomberg, a former aide to the Royal Family of the United Kingdom, founded the firm in 2002 and as of 2012 served as the CEO. The firm provides intelligence and investigation services in the security, banking and government sectors. It draws personnel from military-intelligence and police backgrounds. The firm employs personnel from various specialist backgrounds, including TSCM specialist, Michael Moran. The company is involved both in physical private security and in combatting corporate espionage. A large portion of its clients comprises international law firms based in the UK.

== The War on Terror ==
One year prior to the 2005 London bombings, Alex Bomberg was among the first to warn the city of London that it would one day be victim of a terrorist attack itself following 9–11. During the 2003 invasion of Iraq, the company worked on intelligence tasks and protection contracts in Iraq and the Middle East. The firm is known for staging rescues of foreign civilians in war zones, regardless of whether or not the civilians are on their client list. In August 2003, International Intelligence forces rescued six British lawyers from a hostile crowd in Baghdad, extracting them to a neutral hotel, in a pro bono action despite those solicitors not being clients of the firm.

In 2009, as part of the restructuring under Intelligent (UK Holdings) Limited, the company moved its Private military company and Bodyguard activities over to its sister company, Intelligent Protection International Limited.

== Security and espionage ==
Since the early 2000s, International Intelligence has carried specialist intelligence gathering to aid its clients, often using cold war espionage techniques. In November 2004, the company appeared on the National Geographic Channel, which showed their work in discovering and weeding out hidden recording devices used in corporate espionage. In 2009, International Intelligence CEO, Alex Bomberg, participated in a BBC documentary on intelligence gathering, demonstrating the ease of gathering sensitive information via physical and technical means.

International Intelligence and Bomberg have been interviewed by the press when international espionage is involved in current events, including the swapping of spies between countries and national security practices during global events, including the Wedding of Prince William and Catherine Middleton in 2011. In November 2013, International Intelligence Limited personnel gave expert testimony in the Brunei Magistrates’ Court on behalf of the Brunei Royal family, concerning royal security protocols. In 2015, Bomberg gave a radio interview to London-based Share Radio on the subject of Corporate Espionage and in a 2017 article in the US publication, Voice of America, named “London's Spy Industry Thrives in Private Sector” Bomberg discussed the work of private intelligence companies.

== See also ==
- List of private security companies
- Private military company
