= Sandra Mansour =

Lebanese fashion designer

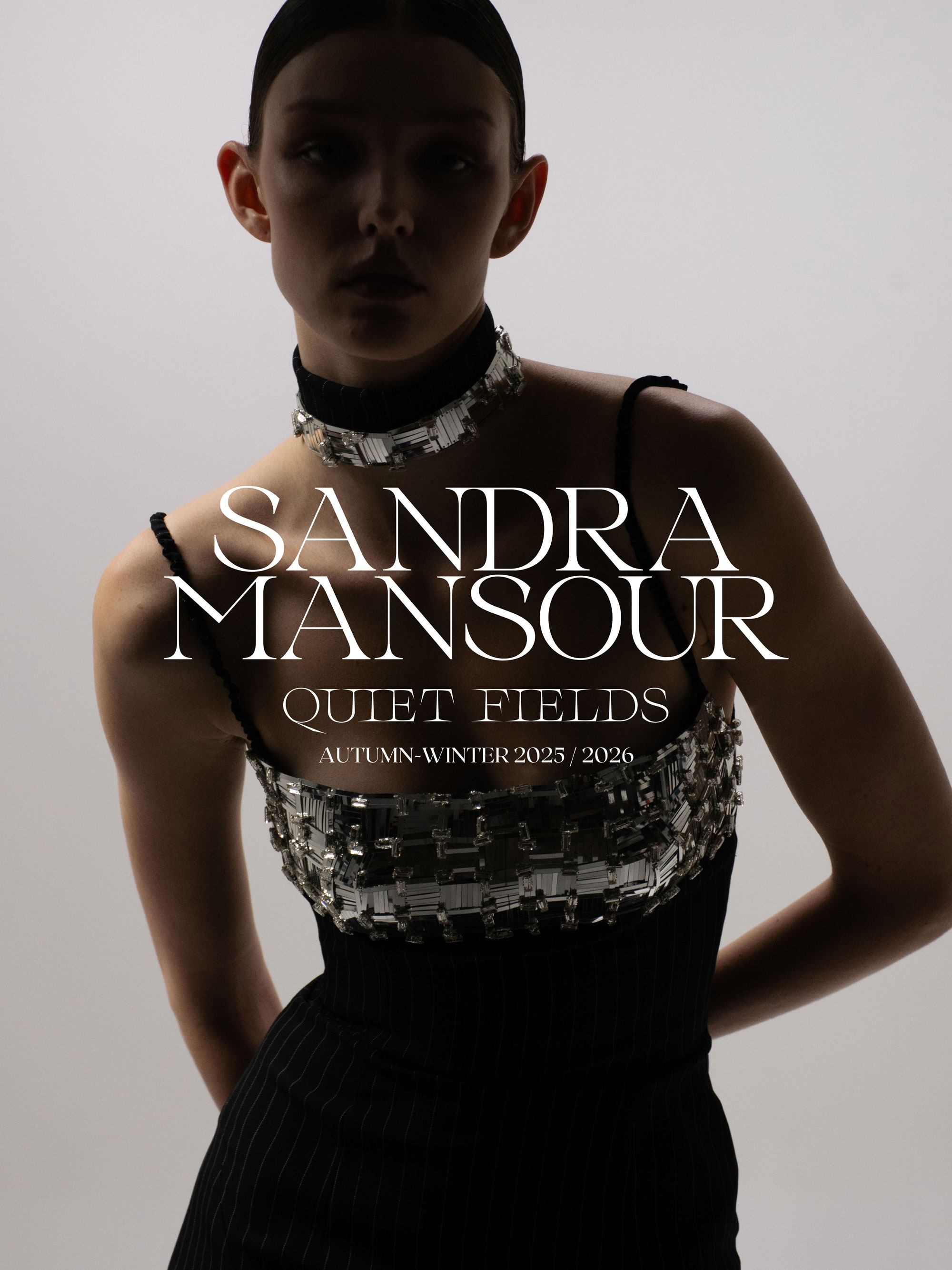
Sandra Mansour - Quiet Fields Collection

Sandra Mansour is a Swiss-born French-Lebanese fashion designer.

== Early life and education ==
Mansour was born and raised in Geneva, Switzerland. Her parents fled from Lebanon to Switzerland during the Lebanese Civil War. She moved to Beirut with her parents at age thirteen, where she lived until she was eighteen. She moved back to Switzerland to study business management at Webster University Geneva. After graduating from Webster, Mansour pursued an arts degree from Beaux Arts in Geneva. She later trained in fashion design under Elie Saab. She obtained a master's degree in fashion design at the Istituto Marangoni in Paris.

== Career ==
Mansour founded her fashion house, named after her, in Beirut in 2010. She serves as the principal designer and the chief executive officer of the fashion label. Mansour's company mainly marketed to Middle Eastern and European clients until she partnered with Moda Operandi to expand the customer base.

In 2017 Mansour was named as an "international emerging designer", representing the Middle East, at the Buro Fashion Forward Initiative. She created a collection for Farfetch in collaboration with Buro 24/7.

Mansour's atelier and home were damaged in the 2020 Beirut explosion on 4 August 2020. In her Vogue interview regarding the explosion, she noted that the citizens in the streets helping each other afterwards gave her hope for Lebanon's future. She was in Geneva at the time of the explosion. Later that month she released the fashion line Fleur du Soleil as a collaboration with H&M. The line, which includes fifteen pieces, was scheduled to be released on 6 August but was postponed due to the explosion. The collection was inspired by woman artists including Toyen, Dorothea Tanning, Lena Leclercq, and Bibi Zogbé. Following the release of Fleur du Soleil, Sandra Mansour x H&M donated $100,000 from the proceeds to the Lebanese Red Cross. Mansour is the first Arab designer to partner with the Swedish fashion company.

Her Spring 2020 and 2021 ready-to-wear lines were featured in Vogue.

She has dressed celebrities including Sarah Jessica Parker, Cleo von Adelsheim, Ekaterina Malysheva, Gigi Hadid, Ming Xi, and Zoë Pastelle.
