= Luele Diamond Mine =

Diamond mine in Angola

- Location in Angola
- Location: 35 km from Saurimo in the Luele river basin,Lunda Sul,Angola; 9°32′37″S 20°09′56″E
- Products: Diamonds
- Production: 628 million carats
- Type: Kimberlite deposit mine
- Greatest depth: 600 m
- Discovered: 2013
- Opened: 2023
- Company: Sociedade Mineira de Catoca (50.5%) ENDIAMA (44.5%)

Luele diamond mine is an Angolan mine located in the northeastern province of Lunda Sul. It is Angola's largest diamond mining project, along with being one of the most important diamond discoveries globally in the past half-century. This kimberlite deposit mine officially commenced operations in November 2023 after a decade of exploration and development. With an investment of around US$600 million and an estimated total resource of 628 million carats with a projected operational lifespan of 60 years, the Luele mine is a massive project. It can transform Angola's diamond production capacity and solidify the country's position as a major player in the global diamond industry.

== Discovery and geological characteristics ==
The prospecting in the area began in 2007, and the Luele kimberlite deposit was discovered in November 2013 by Sociedade Mineira de Catoca. The discovery was a significant event in Angola's mining sector, as it represented the largest diamond find in over 60 years. The kimberlite pipe is located approximately 35 kilometers from the city of Saurimo in the Luele river basin, close to the existing Catoca mine.

The geological characteristics of the Luele deposit are large in scale and valuable in composition. The kimberlite extends to a depth of 600 meters across an area of 105 hectares, containing an estimated 647 million tonnes of ore that is projected to yield 628 million carats of diamonds. This places Luele as the largest diamond project in Angola, the third-largest kimberlite deposit worldwide and the third-largest diamond mine in the world.

== Exploration and development ==
The journey from discovery to production at Luele was a decade of exploration and development. Following the initial discovery in 2013, geological studies were conducted to assess the deposit's commercial viability and develop appropriate extraction strategies. During the pilot phase, the mine successfully produced 5 million carats, demonstrating the deposit's economic potential and validating the extraction methodologies.

== Operations ==
The Luele mine is designed with an initial processing capacity of 4 million metric tons of ore annually, with the possibility for expansion up to 12 million metric tons. Initial production of one million carats per year is projected in the early operational phase, generating an estimated annual gross revenue of US$60 million. When full-scale production is achieved, this is expected to reach up to 20 million carats per year. This production would double Angola's existing national diamond output. With the mine's expected operational lifespan of 60 years, extending to 2083, the mine promises long-term economic benefits to the country.

== Ownership structure ==
The ownership structure of the Luele mine is complex, with both the Angolan state and international private entities being involved, due to Angola's strategic approach to managing its mineral resources. Sociedade Mineira de Catoca, the state-controlled diamond mining company that discovered the deposit, holds the largest stake at 50.5% of the project.

The Angolan state diamond company ENDIAMA has 44.5%, reflecting the government's commitment to maintaining significant control over this strategic asset. Other stakeholders include Companhia Mineira do Catoca with a 50.5% interest, Reform holding 4%, and the Instituto Geológico de Angola (IGEO) maintaining 1% ownership.
