= Bidvest Protea Coin =

- Type: Subsidiary
- Industry: Private security company
- Headquarters: Centurion, Gauteng, South Africa
- Area served: Africa
- Number of employees: 27,000
- Parent: Bidvest Group
- Website: www.proteacoin.co.za

Bidvest Protea Coin is a major private security company based in South Africa. With 27,000 employees the company was formed in 1974 through the merger of Bidvest Magnum and the Protea Coin Group.

== History ==
The Protea Coin Group was formed in 2007 through the merger of Protea Security and Coin Security Group. Bidvest acquired Shield Security in 1998 and Magnum Security in 2002 which subsequently merged to form Bidvest Magnum Group. Protea Coin Group and Bidvest Magnum then merged to form Bidvest Protea Coin in November 2013.

== Services ==
The most common work the company undertakes is prevention and detection of small-scale crime. The company also provides security at many mines in South Africa. It operates across South Africa, some other African countries and the United Arab Emirates. Other services provided include fencing, retail security, aviation security, close protection, vehicle tracking and recovery amongst others.

== Awards ==
In 2015 Bidvest Protea Coin was a finalist in the South African Premier Business Awards, operated by the Department of Trade and Industry.
