= Intelligent UK Holdings Limited =

Intelligent (UK Holdings) Limited
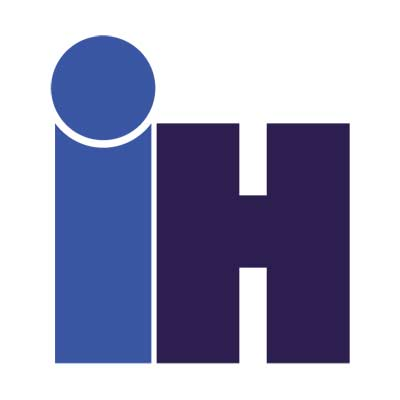
- Type: Limited company
- Industry: Technical surveillance counter-measures counter espionage Military technology Competitive intelligence Defensive driving Bodyguard; Body armor
- Founded: 2008
- Headquarters: Eastington, Stroud, U.K.
- Key people: Alexander J Bomberg (Group CEO); George R. Foster (Managing Director)
- Website: https://www.intelligent-holdings.co.uk/

Intelligent (UK Holdings) Limited is a Holding Company and Parent company headquartered in Gloucestershire, United Kingdom and was incorporated on 21 May 2008. Intelligent (UK Holdings) Limited provides a group management structure for four companies and was born out of the operations of International Intelligence Limited, a company specialising in Intelligence, Counter Espionage and TSCM sweeping.

== Company Overview ==
Across the Intelligent (UK Holdings) Limited group of companies, activities are mainly within the global security and defence industry, with operations in a number of countries and clients including the United Nations and royal families.

Alexander J. Bomberg, a former aide to the British royal family is the Group CEO of Intelligent (UK Holdings) Limited group of companies.

== Group Structure ==
There are four companies and two brands under the Parent company Intelligent (UK Holdings) Limited. All companies are registered in the United Kingdom with the exception of Intelligent Protection International Limited, which is also registered in both the United Kingdom and France. Foster, George R. (19 May 2017). "New Paris Offices" (Press release). Paris, France: Intelligent Protection International Limited.

International Intelligence Limited - Incorporated on 11 July 2002.
International Intelligence Limited specialises in Technical surveillance counter-measures, counter espionage, competitive intelligence, counter surveillance and intelligence. The company has offices in both London and Washington DC.

Intelligent Armour Limited - Incorporated on 29 April 2008.
A manufacturer of Body Armor and Military technology for the military and police markets, based in the United Kingdom. Intelligent Armour Limited is also the registered owner of a number of Trademarks.

Intelligent Training International Limited - Incorporated on 28 May 2008.
Specialising in Defensive driving and evasive driver training courses and based in the United Kingdom, Intelligent Training International Limited, works closely with organisations such as RoSPA to provide training courses for government clients and international organisations such as, the United Nations. In 2015, Intelligent Training International started offering lectures on the subject of Counter espionage.

Intelligent Protection International Limited - Incorporated on 30 March 2009.
Intelligent protection International Limited is based in the United Kingdom and provides multilingual Close Protection Bodyguards to corporate and private clients. In 2015, the company launched its Risk Report services, providing Country specific information on security and terrorism to aid its clients in Risk Management. Intelligent Protection International Limited is the registered owner of the Trademark "Retained Protection" and uses this Trademark as a Brand to market some of its Close Protection services.

== Trademarks ==
Intelligent (UK Holdings) Limited is the registered owner of the Trademark "Insight, not hindsight", registered in the United Kingdom.

== See also ==
- List of private security companies
- Private military company
