= Merlin diamond mine =

Former diamond mine in Northern Territory, Australia

- Location in Australia
- Location: Borroloola, Northern Territory, Australia; 16°51′S 136°20′E
- Products: Diamonds
- Opened: 2000
- Closed: 2003
- Company: North Australian Diamonds Limited
- Website: http://www.nadl.com.au/

The Merlin diamond mine is one of only three diamond mines in Australia. The mine is located in the Northern Territory of Australia, about 80 kilometres south of Borroloola. The mine operated for a period of about three years from 2000 to mid-2003, during which time it produced about 500,000 carats (100 kg) of high quality diamonds.

The Merlin mine has an unusually high proportion of gem-quality diamonds: 65% of production is gem-quality, and only 35% is classified as near-gem or industrial quality. This compares to a worldwide average of just 20% gem-quality diamond production at diamond mines worldwide, and a mere 5% gem-quality production at Australia's largest diamond mine, Argyle diamond mine. The high ratio of gem-quality diamonds is responsible for a relatively high value of 108 USD per carat (540 $/g). The known ore grade at Merlin is about 0.2 carats (40 mg) per tonne, although exploration continues under the mine's new owner. The largest diamond produced at the Merlin mine measured 104.73 carats (20.946 g), the largest ever found in Australia, and has been valued at over US$525,000 .

The mine and mining rights were sold by Rio Tinto Group, to Striker Resources, which explored the possibility of reopening it . Striker has since become North Australian Diamonds , a company which operated the mine for a short period in 2006. Rio Tinto originally acquired the mining lease after a takeover of Ashton mining (November 2000) in which it also gained full control of the Argyle diamond mine. Ashton mining initially developed and operated the mine.
