= Private Security Company Association of Iraq =

PSCAI Logo

The Private Security Company Association of Iraq (PSCAI) was a nonprofit organization formed to discuss and address matters of mutual interest and concern pertaining to the private security industry in Iraq. The PSCAI worked closely with the Iraqi Government and the Coalition Provisional Authority. The association was dissolved on December 31, 2011.

== History ==
With the dissolution of the Coalition Provisional Authority (CPA) in June 2004, the office within the CPA (the Private Security Company Working Group) that was responsible for all matters relating to private security companies was also dissolved. The leadership of several private security companies realized that although the office had gone away, the need for a centralized point for all matters relating to private security companies still existed. As a result, on industry initiative, the PSCAI was officially formed in August 2004. The very first company to join was an Iraqi company, the Falcon Group. The director of the association serves as the principal liaison between the USG, GoI and member companies. In March 2007 a deputy director was added. In December 2011, the organization disbanded.

== Activities ==
Consisting of over 40 member companies, the PSCAI was the only active trade group in Iraq focusing on issues related to the private security company industry. The PSCAI served a liaison between the Multi-National Force – Iraq, the Government of Iraq, the Coalition Governments and its member companies. While primarily an operationally focused organization, the PSCAI advocated on behalf of the industry internationally. In addition to representing its members in meetings with senior leaders of the United States Government, Coalition Governments and the Government of Iraq to include the Kurdish Regional Government (KRG), the association disseminated information critical to operations in Iraq to all members.

The PSCAI held monthly plenary meetings, or when required. These meetings were typically attended by member companies operating in Iraq, as well as by representatives of the Iraq Ministry of Interior, US Embassy Regional Security Office, Joint Area Support Group Central, Multi-National Force Iraq and its Contractor Procedures Oversight Division, Multi-National Corps – Iraq and its Contractor Operations Centre, United States Air Force International Zone Police, Project & Contracting Office Logistics, Logistics Movement Control Centre, and the Joint Contracting Command Iraq and Afghanistan.

A small core staff including an appointed Director and Deputy Director lead the association. The remaining leadership of the association is a seven-member Board of Directors serving six-month terms. The Board is elected from representatives of member companies and is responsible for setting overall policy and objectives for the association.

For some time, the association was involved in efforts to enforce standard rules and regulations as guidelines, for conducting private security operations in Iraq. Additionally, the association was working with the Government in all of Iraq to ensure fair, consistent, and transparent licensing and registration procedures and operational matters including weapons cards and registration, vehicle registration, incident resolution, etc.

The PSCAI was a strong advocate for accountability in the private security company industry and according to its charter, "Will insist upon behaviours consistent with norms and conventions of the international community." The association charter further states, "the PSCAI maintains an active interest in the conduct and behaviour of all private security companies and fundamentally recognizes that its Members must operate within the Law of Iraq." Related to transparency for the private security company industry, the PSCAI works to establish and maintain a network with members, the Iraqi and relevant governments, coalition, private security company clients, media and other stakeholders that allow discussion and resolution of security related issues with transparency, accountability, mutual understanding and trust." The PSCAI maintains an active interest in the conduct and behaviour of all private security companies and fundamentally recognizes that its members must operate within the Law of Iraq and endeavours to engender good will and foster good relationships within the Iraqi community by the promotion of acceptable practices based on the fundamental respect for the rights and dignity for the Iraqi people. Furthermore, PSCAI members are required to comply with Rules for the use of force as defined within the Laws of Iraq, Laws of Armed conflict and contractual terms, ensuring all personnel are trained in these regulations.

== Sources ==
- PSCAI website
- PSCAI Members List
