= Luarica diamond mine =

Diamond mine in Angola

Coordinates: 8.28969°S 21.03693°E

- Interactive map of Luarica diamond mine
- Location: Angola
- Products: Diamonds (95,000 carats in 2003)
- Company: Endiama (38%); Trans Hex (32%)

The Luarica diamond mine is a diamond mine located in Angola. The mine is owned by a consortium of diamond mining companies, the two largest holders being Endiama with a 38 percent ownership, and Trans Hex with a 32 percent ownership.

In 2004, the Luarica mine produced about 95,000 carats (19 kg) of diamond from over 632,000 cubic meters of processed ore. Of this production 84,000 carats (16.8 kg) was sold in 2004 at an average price of over US$300 per carat (1500 $/g), marking a new high for Angolan diamond production.

The mine's Probable reserves are 1.3 million cubic meters of ore, at an ore grade of 21.6 carats (4.32 g) per 100 cubic meters (43.2 mg/m^{3}). There is a waste rock overburden of about 9.5 million cubic meters.

Mining operations were suspended in May 2009 due to a decline in diamond demand caused by the Great Recession. Trans Hex announced in August 2011 that it planned to withdraw from its two Angola joint-ventures with Endiama—Luarica and Fucauma—after failing to reach an agreement with the Government of Angola (which owns the other major partner, Endiama). Endiama stated that it planned to restart operations alone.
