= Halogen Group Nigeria =

Nigerian security company

Halogen Group
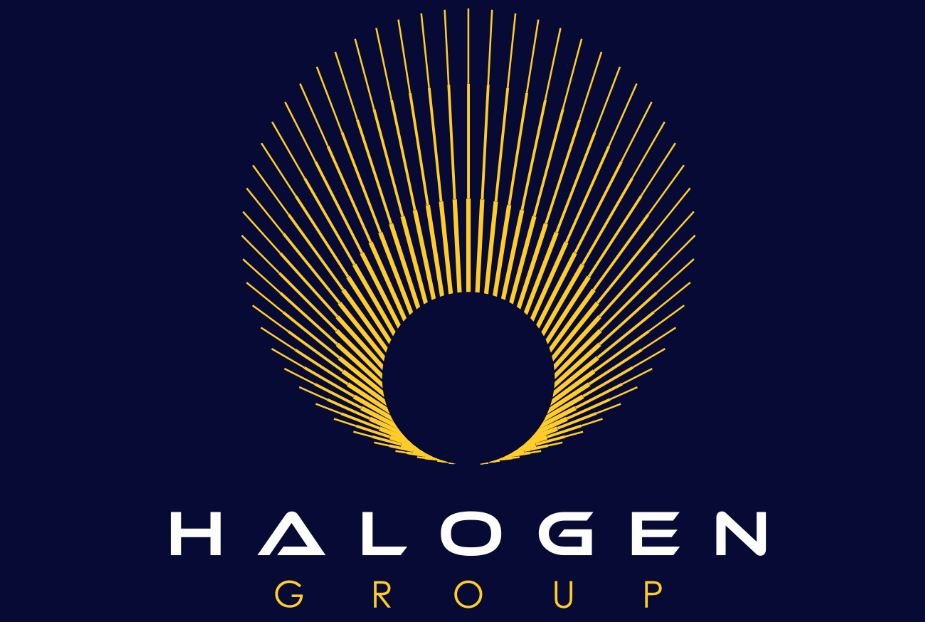
- Formerly: Halogen Security Company Limited
- Type: Private limited company
- Industry: security
- Founded: July 1992
- Founder: Biodun Shobanjo
- Headquarters: Lagos, Nigeria
- Number of employees: 20,000

Halogen Group Nigeria formally known as Halogen Security Company is the first indigenous private security company in Nigeria founded by Biodun Shobanjo in July 1992.

== History ==
Halogen Group started in Ikeja, Lagos State, Nigeria and is registered as a private limited liability company, as Halogen Security Company Limited. They provide security risk service to enterprise and individuals.

== Services ==
They provide service to risk management, national infrastructure protective services, electronic and cyber security. They have also established a training institute for manpower development.

In 2019, the company launched 6 sub companies to provide security solutions using technology in Nigeria and West Africa.

== Awards ==
The company has received awards across Nigeria and Africa. Some include the Nigeria Advancement Award and Best Private Security Company.
