= Sociedade de Desenvolvimento Mineiro de Angola =

Angolan public mining company

Sociedade de Desenvolvimento Mineiro
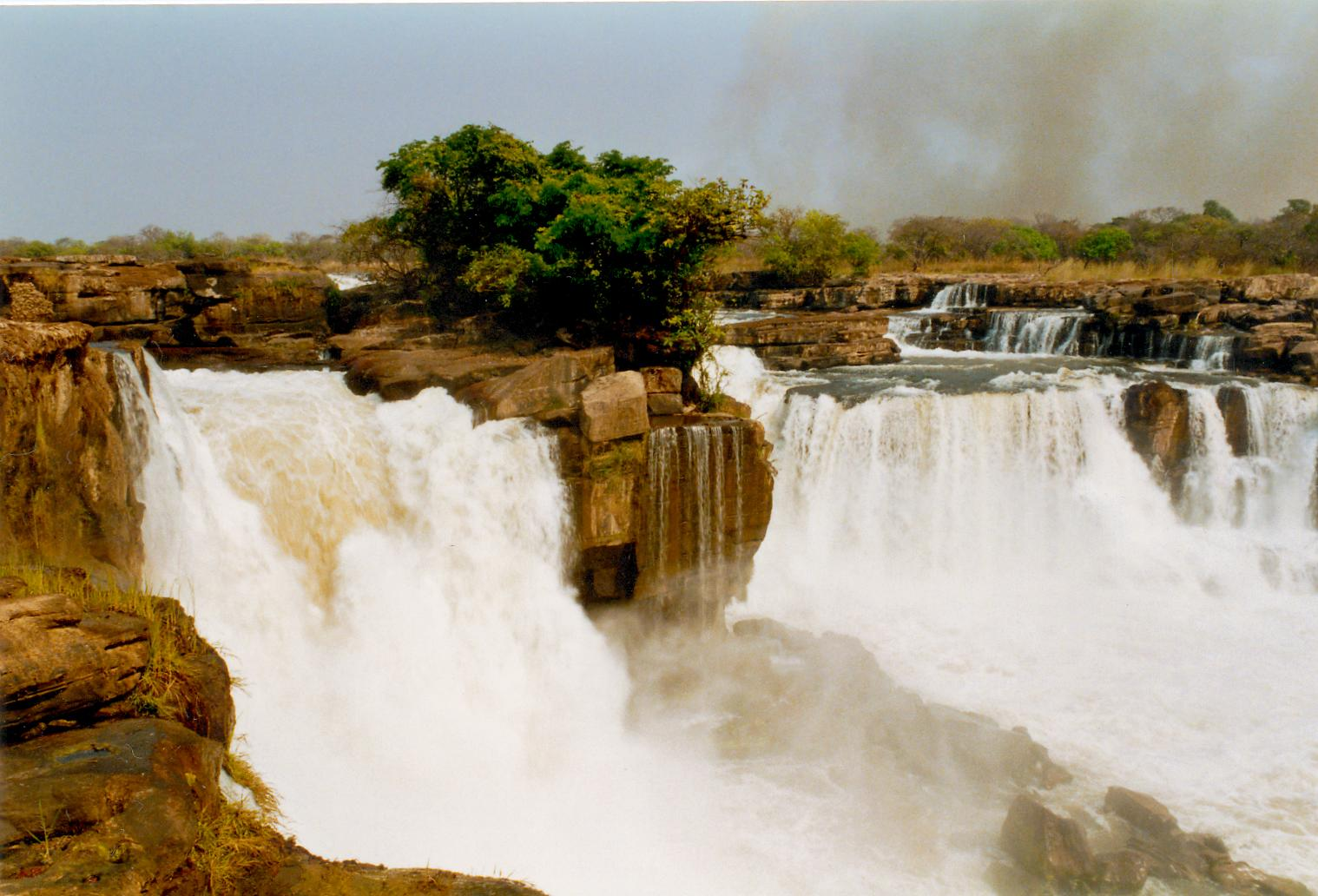
- Waterfalls on the Cuango River, off which SDM mines diamonds.
- Type: Joint venture
- Industry: Mining
- Founded: August 25, 1995; 30 years ago
- Headquarters: Angola
- Owner: Endiama, Odebrecht, and an Angolan public company
- Number of employees: 1,295 (2005)

Sociedade de Desenvolvimento Mineiro (SDM) is an Angolan public mining company and holds the mining rights in an area of concession of 2,950 km2, located in the hydrological basin of Cuango River, Lunda Norte Province. SDM is a joint venture between the Angolan public company Endiama (National Diamond Company of Angola), and the Brazilian private company OMSI (Odebrecht Mining Services Inc).

== History ==
The Sociedade de Desenvolvimento Mineiro was created by presidential decree on 25 August 1995. It overtook the Cuango mining operations abandoned since 1992, but which still represented the country's second largest diamond mining operations. Odebrecht had gotten the concession of the site in 1991 through a deal with De Beers, but the site had been overtaken by the revolutionary UNITA 15 months into the contract.

The SDM produced 419,000 carats of diamond in 2001. SDM made a revenue of $177 million in 2003, but the Cuango/Luzamba concession was set to expire in 2004. In 2004, SDM was Angola's second producer of diamond with 622,000 carats extracted. Revenues dropped to $103 million.

Odebrecht has a controversial reputation in its country (Brazil), and was treated as an over-privileged guest in Angola, which eventually led to internal conflicts within the SDM.

== Activities ==
The SDM prospects, develops, mines and trades diamonds from primary and secondary deposits, identified in the region of Cuango River, in the north-eastern region of Angola that produces good quality stones. Bulk sampling of river terrace gravels in the vicinity of the Ganzo, Tázua and Ginge river diversions have revealed economic diamond grades.

In 2005, the company had 1,293 employees.
