= Catoca diamond mine =

Diamond mine in Angola

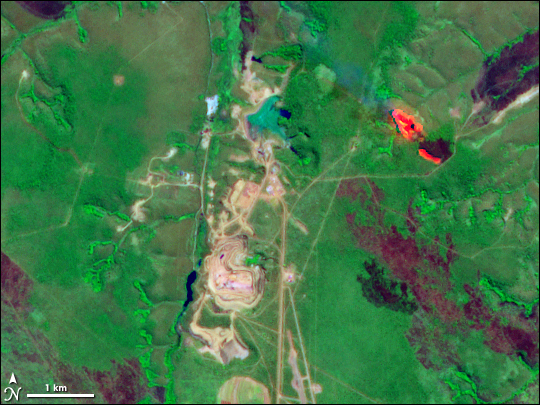
- Satellite image of the mine from June 21, 2001. The light-red point in the north-east of the mine is a bush fire.

- Location in Angola
- Location: Saurimo, Lunda Sul, Angola; 09°23′56″S 020°18′03″E
- Products: diamonds (2.6 million carats in 2001)
- Type: open-pit
- Company: Endiama (59 %); ALROSA (41 %)
- Website: https://www.catoca.com/

The Catoca diamond mine in Angola was established in 1992, and began production in 1997. It is the fourth largest diamond mine in the world. The mine is located on a kimberlite pipe. The mine is owned by a joint venture between the Angolan state-owned company Endiama, and Taadeen Holdings, a subsidiary of the Oman Investment Authority.

== Ownership ==
In 2011, Lev Avnerovich Leviev sold LL International Holding, which held an 18% stake in Catoca to the Chinese company Sonangol International.

In 2017 the mine was owned by a consortium of international mining interests, including Endiama (the state mining company of Angola) (32.8% ownership), Alrosa of Russia (32.8%), Odebrecht of Brazil (16.4%), and the Chinese owned LL International Holding B.V. (18%).

In 2017, Odebrecht sold off its 16.4% stake in Catoca.

In 2018, Alrosa, which had been associated with the mine since 1992, expanded its stake to 41% ownership, with the remainder held by Endiama (41%) and the Chinese company LL International Holding (18%).

In June 2022, Angola seized a stake in the nation’s biggest diamond miner, giving it majority control of Catoca. The 18% stake previously held by LL International holding was nationalized.

In 2022 sanctions were imposed on Alrosa for Moscow's role in the conflict in Ukraine. Sanctions-hit Alrosa, as a shareholder in Catoca, were affecting "Angola's credibility in the international diamond market".

Effective May 2025 Alrosa has divested its stake in Catoca, and a subsidiary of Oman's sovereign wealth fund has replaced sanctions-hit Russian firm Alrosa as a shareholder in Catoca. Angola's Ministry of Mineral Resources, Oil and Gas, confirmed said the deal had been formalised on May 26. Catoca's shareholder structure then showed that Endiama EP, Angola's national diamond company, owns 59% of Catoca, with Taadeen holding the remaining 41%, which used to be held by Alrosa.

== Production ==
The mine had production of 1,800,000 carats (360 kg) in 2000 and 2,600,000 carats (520 kg) in 2001. The mine's production is 35% gem quality, compared to a global average of 20%; the diamonds produced at Catoca have an average value of US$75–$100 per carat ($375–500/g). Estimated reserves are 60 million carats (12 tonnes).

The diamonds from Catoca Mining Society topped the sales of 2009, with a net profit of US$70 million, resulting from a gross production of US$122.6 million, Angop. The information is contained in an annual report from the company released in September 2011. According to the source, the sales reached 7,050,521 carats (1,410.1042 kg), at the average rate of US$62.23, a volume that represented about 78 percent of the amount sold by the diamond companies around the country. The note states that as a result of the processing of the ore, the company obtained a total of 7.5 million carats that permitted it to establish the operational cost.

In 2012 the mine extracted 6,500,000 carats (1,300 kg) out of 10 million tonnes of ore production.

== Infrastructure ==
A hydroelectric power plant on the Chicapa River provides electricity to the mine as well as Saurimo.

== 2021 tailings leak ==
In July 2021, waste material from the mine leaked into the nearby Tshikapa river. The Democratic Republic of the Congo stated the contaminated water killed 12 people, and sickened more than 4,000. After the DRC announced it would pursue monetary damages, the state-controlled miner MIBA signed a diamond mining partnership agreement with Alrosa, but did not mention the recent leak.

The spill turned the river red and killed large numbers of fish, but Catoca claimed the spill did not contain heavy metals. Independent testing found the presence of nickel and uranium contamination. Satellite imaging collected by the European Space Agency's Sentinel-2 was able to infer the extent of the impact on water quality by observing the change in the river's color. The government of the DRC initially said it would pursue unspecified monetary damages for the incident, but as of October 2022, no talks had taken place.

== Geology ==
The Catoca diamond deposit occurs in the biggest kimberlite pipe situated in the Lucapa structure in north-east Angola.

The pipe is roughly circular with a surface diameter of approximately 900 metres and a surface area of 64 hectares.

The pipe contains various kimberlite facies, including crater, diatreme, and hypabyssal rocks. The upper layers consist of tuffaceous sandstones and mudstones deposited in a crater lake that once occupied the volcanic vent.
