= Lev Avnerovich Leviev =

Soviet-born Israeli businessman, philanthropist and investor

Lev Leviev
- לב לבייב
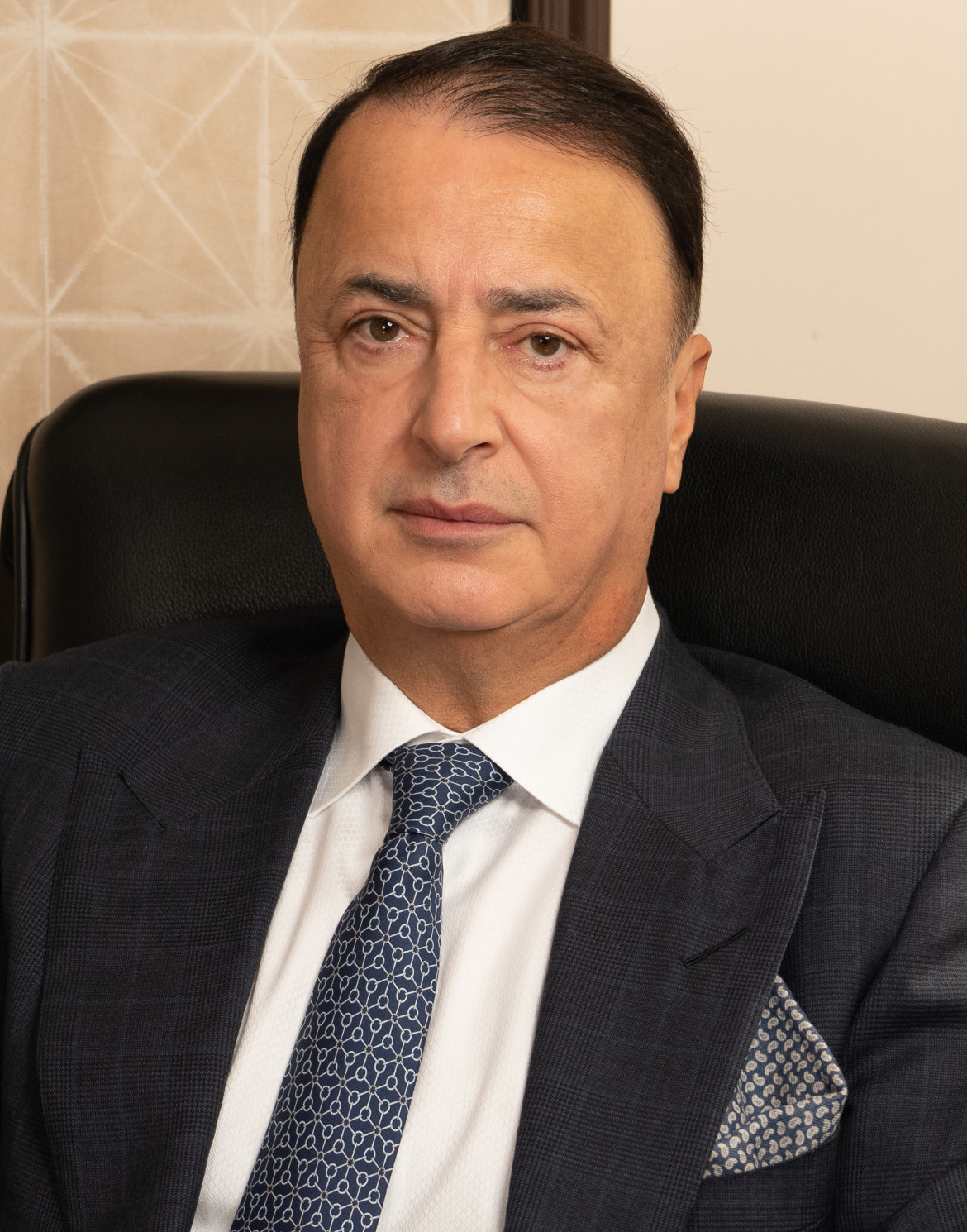
- Leviev in 2021
- Born: Lev Avnerovich Leviev; 30 July 1956 (age 70); Samarkand, Uzbek SSR, Soviet Union
- Spouse: Olga Leviev
- Children: 9

Lev Avnerovich Leviev (Hebrew: לב אבנרוביץ לבייב; born 30 July 1956) is an Israeli diamond magnate, investor and philanthropist. Leviev was the chairman and majority shareholder of Africa Israel Investments, a diversified conglomerate, between 1997 and 2018. Leviev lived in Israel between 1971 and 2007 and moved to reside in London. He is a noted philanthropist for Chabad Lubavitch causes in Eastern Europe and Israel. In 2018, Leviev had a net worth of US$1 billion according to Forbes.

== Early life ==
Leviev was born in Samarkand, Uzbek SSR, in 1956. His family moved to Israel in 1971 where he lived until 2007 when he moved to London. His parents, Avner and Chana Leviev, were prominent members of the Bukharian Jewish community, and Leviev is a practicing Orthodox Jew. He is a supporter of the Chabad movement, but as a Bukharian Jew he was brought up in the Bukharian liturgy. In 1971, when he was fifteen, his family emigrated from Uzbekistan to Israel. Alisher Usmanov's father was the prosecutor in Tashkent who helped facilitate the Leviev's departure for Israel.

=== Start in the diamond trade ===
Shortly after moving to Israel, Leviev began to work as an apprentice in a diamond polishing plant, learning the 11 steps of the diamond cutting process. After serving in the communications directorate of the Israel Defense Forces, he established his own diamond polishing plant in 1977. In 1980, he acquired 12 competing factories that suffered from credit shortage due to the recession in the diamond industry. The acquisition was done with the help of his father in law's family. In 1992, he moved to Russia and purchased Russia's oldest jewelry factory, Ruis Diamonds Ltd. of Moscow which specializes in fancy cutting and high-end ideal cuts of larger diamonds and competes with Smolensk Cristal, and the Moscow Jewelry Factory (Russian: Московский ювелирный завод (МЮЗ)). Valery Rudakov (Russian: Валерий Владимирович Рудаков), a representative with the Main Directorate of Precious Metals and Diamonds (Glavalmazzolot) (Note: During the 1980s, the Glavalmazzolot (Russian: Главное управление драгоценных металлов и алмазов ("Главалмаззолото")) was formed as a state owned enterprise to manage the production of gold and diamonds in the Soviet Union, as well as the cutting and jewelry industry, wholesale trade in diamonds, diamonds and jewelry in the USSR and abroad.) and the former head of the Yakutskalmaz trust, facilitated Leviev's ownership of Ruis Diamonds.

== Political ties and activities ==
In the 1990s, Leviev avoided being directly involved with the Yeltsin family, and nurtured ties with Vladimir Putin. Starting in 1999, Putin enlisted Leviev and fellow Russian oligarch Roman Abramovich—both future major patrons of Chabad—to help establish the Federation of Jewish Communities of Russia, led by Chabad Rabbi Berel Lazar, soon dubbed “Putin’s rabbi”.

=== Links to Trump family ===
According to an article published in The Guardian on 24 July 2017, Donald Trump's son-in-law Jared Kushner sealed a real estate deal in 2015 worth $295 million to purchase space in the former New York Times Building on 43rd Street near Times Square from Leviev's firms Africa Israel Investments and Five Mile Capital. Later, in October 2016, Kushner used this space as a basis for a $285 million loan from Deutsche Bank. The ties between Trump family real estate deals and Russian money interests attracted the justice department's special counsel, Robert Mueller while Mueller was investigating alleged Russia interference in the 2016 presidential election.

=== Israeli settlements ===
Leviev is involved in the construction of Israeli settlements in the West Bank. Leviev's Danya Cebus company, a subsidiary of Africa-Israel, subcontracted the construction of Mattityahu East to Shaya Boymelgreen. Danya Cebus is also building part of Har Homa and Maale Adumim. In 1999, Leviev's company Danya Cebus announced plans to build new homes in the settlement of Ariel. Through another subsidiary, LIDAR, Leviev appears to be the sole realtor-developer of the settlement of Zufim.

Leviev's devotion to settlement construction have drawn protest from outside the Old Bond Street store in his London home, to the Leviev-owned jewelry store in New York City, and has impelled Oxfam to make it clear that Leviev has not donated to the charity. UNICEF has also advised Leviev that they will not partner with or accept any contributions from him due to the controversy. In a press release, a spokesperson for Leviev described the protests as "politically motivated" and accused protesters of "deliberately neglect[ing]... extensive humanitarian and philanthropic work, which includes building schools, orphanages, and fostering economic development in communities around the world." Anti-Defamation League head Abraham Foxman condemned UNICEF's decision as "selective political discrimination" that "only gives legitimacy to those who would seek to promote a boycott of the State of Israel and its supporters."

In April 2009, following public pressure for a boycott, the UK Foreign and Commonwealth Office announced that it would not be renting its Tel Aviv embassy from Leviev's Africa-Israel company.

In 2013, the Norwegian finance ministry, after a review of Africa-Israel's activities, announced that Norway's oil fund was now allowed to re-invest in Africa-Israel. However, on 3 January 2014 Africa Israel Investments Ltd was placed on the exclusion list, based on "Serious violations of individuals' rights in situations of war or conflict", and has remained there since.

== Business interests ==
Leviev is an investor in the diamond industry, real estate and chemicals. By an agreement, signed in October 2006, Leviev hoped to get into the incarceration business, as a concessionaire for the first private prison in Israel. However, in September 2009, the Israeli High Court of Justice declared private prisons unconstitutional in Israel.

Leviev is currently controlling shareholder and chairman of Africa-Israel which has numerous large real estate investments in Russia. Africa-Israel is on the verge of insolvency, asking to restructure NIS 21 billion of debt. Trying to save the company from bankruptcy, justice Varda Alshech has confirmed the debt-restructuring arrangement between Africa-Israel and its creditors. However, the justice expressed her disapproval: "The arrangement is far from being the best," Alshech said, because the company "is passing on the damage of its investments to its investors."

Leviev had purchased 60% of Africa-Israel holding company in 1996 for $400 million from Bank Leumi, when the bank was ordered by a court to divest of its non-financial businesses. By 2007 it had swelled to $8 billion in market value. With the onset of the 2008 financial crisis, the value of the company plunged, with company debt reportedly totaling $5.5 billion in September 2009.

Leviev owns diamond mines in Russia and Africa and is a major competitor to the De Beers international diamond cartel.

In 2005, Africa-Israel completed a $230 million 5,800-apartment project in Modi'in Illit, an ultra-Orthodox settlement in the West Bank. In early 2007, Africa-Israel opened a luxury jewelry store on Old Bond Street in London and was considering plans to invest billions in the Far East, Argentina, Brazil and Russia. Soon thereafter the global sub-prime mortgage crisis broke, and the value of Africa-Israel's real estate investments plummeted, particularly in New York, where it had invested heavily.

Additionally, he is an international investor in residential real estate, shopping malls, energy, fashion, telecommunications, and media.

His diamond mining investments in Angola and his investments in Israeli settlements have been the target of protests.

=== Debt restructuring ===
After the 2008 financial crisis, Africa Israel Investments was hurt by the drop of real estate values in the United States, Russia and eastern Europe. It defaulted on a series of bonds and in 2010 it restructured 7.4 billion shekels of debt.

In 2016, Africa Israel Investments sought a second debt settlement. In a recorded conversation that was leaked to Israel Channel 10 News, Lev Leviev is heard saying: "I shit on every bank, but they haven't been able to make me move a centimeter because I don't owe any of them money, to no bank in the world. I piss on every bank from above, even Rakefet" (referring to Bank Leumi CEO Rakefet Russak-Aminoach)

=== Angolan diamonds ===
Roman Abramovich strongly supported Leviev during Leviev's entrance into the Angolan diamond market and his gaining a monopoly on diamonds exported from Angola.

As De Beers came under fire during the blood diamonds furor, Leviev increasingly came to dominate the legal Angola diamond market through the Angola Selling Corporation (Ascorp) formed in early 2000 in which the Angolan government maintains half the stake in Ascorp and Leviev and the Omega Diamonds of Antwerp, Belgium, each have about a quarter stake in Ascorp. At the same time, all contracts signed with Angola Exploration, Exploitation, Lapidation and Trading Company of Diamonds (Endiama), Angola's state owned diamond marketing company, were declared void which hastened De Beers exit from Angola and thus allowed Leviev to gain a large stake in Angolan diamonds. Leviev says he presented Angola with a plan to reduce smuggling and increase revenue by funneling diamonds through only one source, while others claim the deal was clinched through Leviev's connections with obscure Russian businessmen. Leviev focuses on the benefits his company brings Angola, arguing that before his involvement in 1998, Angola's tax revenue from diamonds was under $10 million but rose to $49 million by 2001: “The government of Angola has obviously profited from this venture.” When critics query how his company benefits not just the government but the people of Angola, he answers that the Leviev Group's heavy investments in Angolan diamonds "will change the informal way of doing business into a more formalized, educated system that helps individual families... We want to help people who work with their hands. We want Angolans to develop many different new skills.” New York Magazine reported in 2007 that a security company hired by Leviev had been accused by a local human rights group that year "of participating in practices of 'humiliation, whipping, torture, sexual abuse, and, in some cases, assassinations.' Leviev did not directly respond to the charges, but noted his charitable activities in Angola. Both Isabel dos Santos and Leviev, who has a majority ownership, are partners in Angola's first and, at the time, only kimberlite mine at Catoca in the Cuango Valley. In 2014, the Catoca mine was owned by Alrosa with a 32.8% stake, Angolan government holding a 32.8% stake, and Lev Leviev International (LLI) with an 18% stake, and Odebrecht holding a 16.4% stake.

In December 2018, it was announced that the Luaxe kimberlite deposit named Luele, which is only 25 kilometers from the Catoca mine, will be developed by the Catoca Mining Company which is owned by Endiama and Alrosa each with 41% stake and the Lev Leviev International Holding BV with an 18% stake. Catoca Mining has a 50.5% stake in the Luaxe deposit and expects to begin industrial production at Luaxe after 2020. With its headquarters at Saurimo, Lunda Sul province, the Catoca Mining Company is the fourth largest producer of diamonds in the world and produces 86.3% by volume and 60.3% by monetary value of Angolan diamonds. VTB will finance the development of Luele which is one of the largest diamond deposits in the world and is expected to more than double Angola's diamond output by 2022.

== Philanthropy ==
After the Revolutions of 1989, Leviev expanded his business into Eastern Europe and the former Soviet Union. He received the blessings and personal support of the Lubavitcher Rebbe, Rabbi Menachem Schneerson, for his philanthropic activities, which funded "an army of some 10,000 Jewish functionaries from Ukraine to Azerbaijan, including 300 rabbis." In particular, he has sponsored many of the activities of the Jewish Learning Initiative. A prominent member of the Bukharian Jewish community, he serves as president of the World Congress of Bukharian Jews.

In 1997, Leviev organized the Federation of Jewish Communities of Russia (FEOR) (Russian: Федерацию Еврейских Общин России (ФЕОР)) for Russian Jews. He also serves as president of the Federation of Jewish Communities of the CIS (FJC), an umbrella body representing Jewish communities across the former Soviet Union, though it is regarded by some observers as an organization founded to counter Jewish groups critical of the Russian government.

In 1992, Leviev established the Ohr Avner Foundation, named in memory of his father, Rabbi Avner Leviev. While founded initially to restore Jewish communal life and education following the fall of the Soviet Union, the foundation developed into a global educational and philanthropic network operated by regional leadership:

- Israel: Directed by CEO Rabbi Yehuda Blau, the foundation's Israeli operations fund and oversee a nationwide network of dozens of day schools, early childhood centers, and community welfare programs. Its flagship campus is the Kfar Sitrin youth village and engineering college near Mount Carmel, heavily dedicated to immigrant youth absorption and participants in the Naale program.
- United States: Headed by CEO Rabbi Zalman Zvulonov, Leviev's foundation built extensive educational and communal infrastructure for the Bukharian and Russian-speaking Jewish diaspora in New York. This includes the Jewish Institute of Queens (JIQ) campus, high schools, and the Bukharian Jewish Community Center (BJCC) in Queens.
- Former Soviet Union: Managed by Director Rabbi David Mondshine, the foundation continues to support Jewish day schools, youth camps, and welfare programs across Russia, Ukraine, Azerbaijan, and Central Asia.

== Personal life ==
Leviev moved to Hampstead, London, with his wife Olga and their two children in 2007. As a keen follower of golf, Leviev also maintains a house in the beach resort of Ponte Vedra, Florida.

On 6 November 2018 Leviev's son, Zevulun, was arrested in Israel for suspected illegal diamond smuggling from Russia to Israel through LLD Diamonds.

In July 2022, it was reported that Leviev had applied for Portuguese citizenship on the basis of being a descendant of Sephardic Jews from Spain.

== See also ==
- Arcadi Gaydamak
- Surat
