= Lerala diamond mine =

Mine near Lerala, Botswana

An Australian company, DiamonEx Limited, opened a diamond mine 15 km (9 mi) north-west of the village of Lerala in Botswana. The mine initially known as Martins Drift Diamond Project opened early 2008 and was to employ 230–290 people to produce an estimated 330,000 carats (66 kg) per year.

== History ==
Previously a joint company between De Beers and the Botswana government operated between 1998–2001 a smaller exploratory diamond mine at the same site. In February 2009 the mine was placed under Judicial Management due to very high operational costs and the world economic crunch. The company then had to seek permission to be placed under judicial management from the High Court. DiamonEx, which had already been listed on the Botswana Stock Exchange (BSE) also had the trading of their shares suspended as a consequence. In 2011, a UK based diamond company Mantle Diamonds bought the Lerala mine from DiamonEx Botswana which was in financial difficulties due to the global economic crisis.

In 2014, the Lerala Mine changed ownership again after another Australian company, Kimberly Diamonds acquired Mantle Diamonds. The mine started operating in August 2015. By May 2017 Lerala Diamond Mines Limited, the Botswana-based subsidiary of Kimberly Diamonds Limited, was forced to suspend operations and placed under judicial management, due to inability to fund the endeavour. The mine was being closed for the third time in its history, after closures in February 2009 and also in July 2012.
