= Rough diamond =

Type of diamond that has not been cut

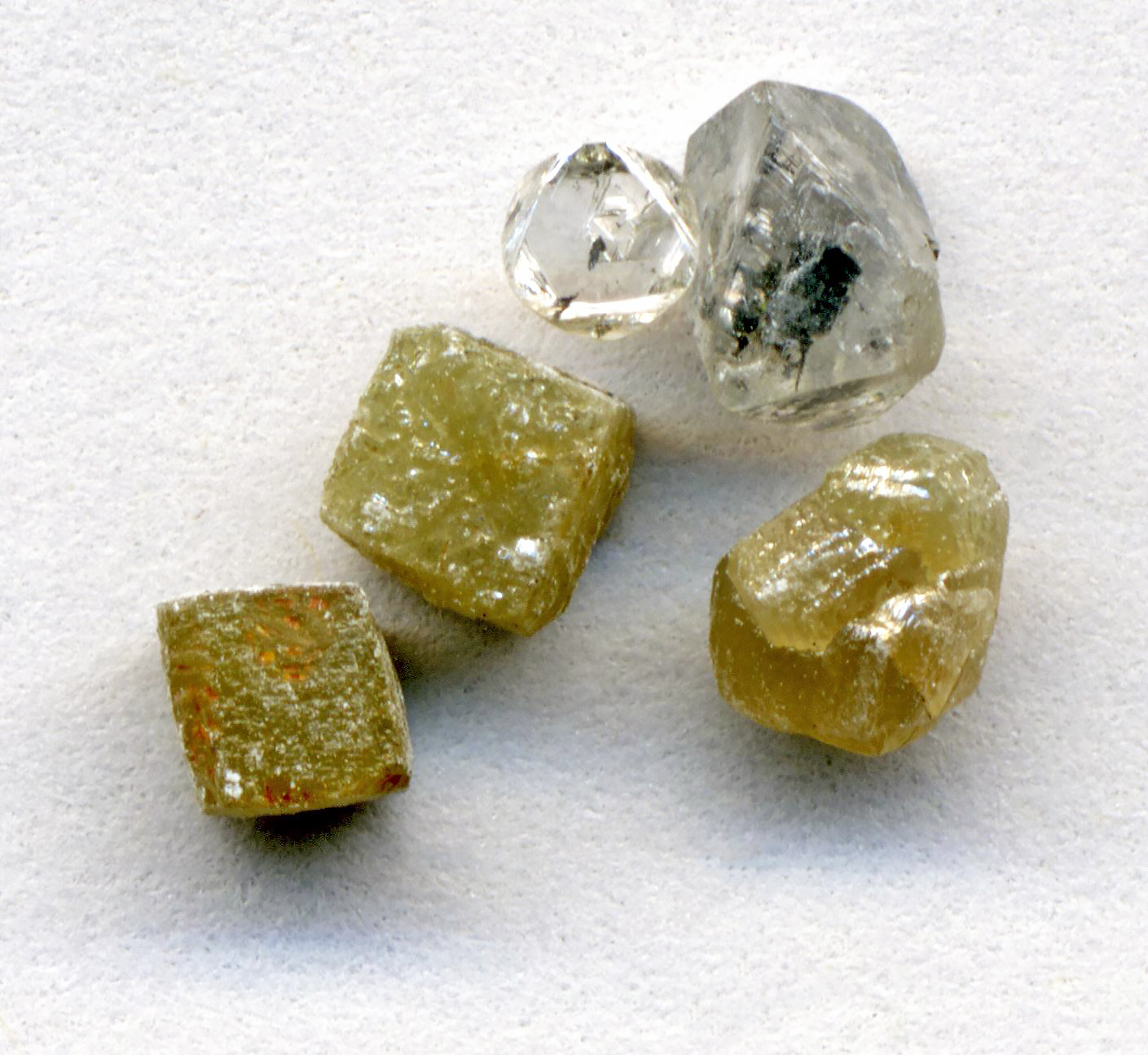
A selection of diamonds, cubic and octahedral

A rough diamond is a diamond that has not been cut or processed. They come in a variety of naturally occurring shapes, including octahedral (eight-sided bipyramid), cubic, and triangular (most commonly macles).

A diamond or rough diamond can also be a type of diamond that is not fully developed or can have less brilliance. Extreme heat and pressure beneath the ground make the carbon atoms fuse in a specific structure.

== See also ==
- Bort
- Carbonado
- Diamond clarity
- Diamond type
- List of diamonds
