= Mikud (company) =

Mikud Israel Ltd.
- Company type: Private
- Industry: Security, Cleaning
- Founded: 1984
- Founder: Soly Elyashar
- Headquarters: Tel Aviv, Israel
- Area served: Israel
- Services: security, guarding, Alarm Monitoring Center
- Owner: Soly Elyashar
- Number of employees: 4,500
- Website: http://www.mikud4u.co.il/

Mikud Group (Hebrew: קבוצת מיקוד) is one of the largest security and cleaning companies in Israel. The company employs about 4,500 workers. The company was established in 1984 by Soli Elyashar. The headquarters of the company is located at Rival Street, south Tel Aviv. The company began its way in Jerusalem solely as a security company, later expanding its services to give Full Solution services to its clients. Today Mikud is made up of four specializing companies:

Mikud Avtakha logo

- Mikud Avtkha (Hebrew: מיקוד אבטחה) – providing different security services to government and private entities. Its activities include security and protection of facilities, personnel, VIP security and physical protection of facilities.
- Moked Mikud (Hebrew: מוקד מיקוד) – operates as the Alarm Monitoring Center of Mikud group. Specializing in emergency call services, operational reconnaissance and electronic protection.

Cleanor logo

- Cleanor (Hebrew: קלינור) – providing cleaning services and cleaning machines, and cleaning materials.
- Techniko (Hebrew: טכניקו) – dealing with building maintenance, technical services and construction, as well as electricity works, water and air conditioner systems.

Since the Israeli Ministry of Defense decided to privatize the Israeli checkpoints operations in the West Bank, Mikud and four other Israeli security companies have provided these services.
