= Spanish Modernist literature =

Spanish Modernist literature is the literature of Spain written during Modernism (beginning of the 20th century) as the arts evolved and opposed the previous Realism.

== Parnasianism and Symbolism ==
The influence of these two movements, which were developed in France from the middle of the 19th century, was very important to the appearance of Modernism in Spain.

- Parnasianism, named after its first appearance in the magazine "Le Parnasse Contemporain" (1866–1876), is a literary style that postulates art for art's sake, far from the important and sentimental ambitions that Romanticism defended. Those in favor tried to create "beautiful objects", approaching exotic subjects and ornamenting them with a musical language, but which are cold. The father of this school was Leconte de Lisle.
- Symbolism, however, has a transcendental ambition. The main figure of the movement is Charles Baudelaire. For the author of The flowers of evil, all the universe, spiritual, and terrestrial, forms a harmonious set, united to each other by invisible correspondences, and the personality of the poet is the one in charge of revealing them. This way, for example, a sun hiding could be seen by the writer as a decay symbol, while a sunrise would symbolize the Renaissance. This assumption suggests comparisons to the poet, but fundamentally metaphors.

== Literary Modernism in Spain: context ==
In Literature, the precursor of Modernism in Spain was Realism.

=== The disaster of the 98 ===
The Spanish–American War, known in Spain as the Disaster of the 98 or War of Cuba, arose between Spain and the United States in 1898, during the regency of María Cristina, widow of the king Alfonso XII. For Spain it meant the loss of the overseas colonies and the end of the formerly powerful Spanish empire.

=== The Regenerationism ===
The intellectual movement that thinks objectively and scientifically about the causes of the decadence of Spain as a nation between the 19th and the 20th century is called Regenerationism. It expresses a pessimist judgement about Spain. The regenerationist intellectuals divulged their studies in journals with a big diffusion, so the movement expanded.

=== The Free Institution of Education ===
Among the organisms of great importance at this time, it is possible to emphasize the Free Institution of Education, founded in Madrid in 1876 by the university professor and thinker Francisco Giner de los Ríos. With philosophical ideas of German origin, he undertook a hard work of cultural modernization of Spain, in education and investigation. His pro-European character was very influential during the 20th century, particularly during the Second Republic, that welcomed his reformist ideals willingly. In 1939 the Institution disappeared, strongly repressed by the winners of the Civil War. Whatsoever, a decidedly modern thought was spread mainly between the bourgeoisie, class which will display the most important authors of the 20th century.

== Characteristics ==
Modernism, studied as a literary or as an artistic-literary movement, appeared in the Hispanic world in the final decades of the 19th century and the first ones of the 20th century. It is seen today as a phenomenon with much more vast projections in space and time. A period of renovation in America and Europe was opened, which started from a common will of rejection towards the dogmas and principles of the society. The Modernist period or time begins and closes in dates that could be fixed towards 1880 and 1945, although precursory signs occurred before the first and they continued being observed after the last.

In the politics, the forms of the modernist disobedience are reflected in a sentimental rather than intellectual inclination, towards the liberating creeds, socialism and anarchism. In their youth, people like Miguel de Unamuno and Leopoldo Lugones were attracted to socialism, whereas the anarchist doctrine seemed at first to attract Pío Baroja and Manuel González Prada. The aversion to the society that surrounded them (and not only, although of course also, the governments) urged them to look for inhabitable worlds, often invented. The indigenism and the exotism are the two slopes of the protest against the predominant meanness.

The escapism and the denunciation of the bourgeois society are complementary aspects of an ambivalent attitude. The plastic writers and artists agreed in the negation, and even an officially conservative man like Antonio Gaudí projected in unusual architectures his escapist deliriums (arabicism of the Vicens House, in Barcelona, or purified gothicism of the Episcopal Palace of Astorga). Indigenism and exotism were not negative attitudes: they implied the affirmation of the inhabitable world; even more, of myths in which close truths of universal validity were declared.

The Modernist authors were simultaneously positivists, by hostility to the established conventions, and antipositivists, by reaction against a system in which the spiritual tendencies did not have place. Trying to affiliate them with a philosophy is so impossible and absurd as trying to affiliate them with a party. From Plato and Pythagoras, mainly from this last one, or the doctrines that are protected under their name, the rhythmical conception of the universe and the life arrived to the Modernists, and it became the axis of their poetic creation.

The Pythagorism of the Modernists comprises an inclination to the esoteric doctrines, shown in their interest for the hidden things and in a desire or restlessness for communicating with the afterlife, expressed already in 1895 by one of its eminent precursors: Gérard de Nerval. The so-called declining Literature familiarized them with the occultism, and Rubén Darío, Leopoldo Lugones, Ramón del Valle-Inclán, Horacio Quiroga, Pío Baroja, among others, wrote narrations in which the action of the strange forces is described. Valle-Inclán wrote up in La lámpara maravillosa (The wonderful lamp) a treaty of esoteric aesthetic.

These restlessness logically derived to interest in spiritism. Even if nonbelieving in it, some Modernist authors really interrogated themselves about the part that could be right in those doctrines, and got initiated in their mysteries. In diverse forms these mysteries infiltrated in their works.

Also the mysticism of the Modernists is interesting, orthodox or heterodox, but rarely free of eroticism, associated to the erotic impulse of giving oneself to the other, to surrender. The end point of the eroticism and the mysticism is the ecstasy. The eroticism approaches other times the violence and the blood, like with Valle-Inclán and Rodríguez Larreta; The glory of Don Ramiro is perhaps the most extreme culmination of such associations, that in poetry were registered in unforgettable verses of Rubén Darío. Other poets (such as Palés Matos and Juan Ramón Jiménez) would later raise the erotic to the point of the metaphysic.

The Modernists were parnasianists, that is, in favor of the impeccable form, of the beauty called to last by the perfection whereupon it was expressed; and symbolists, that revealed the unknown by the well-known, the indescribable in figures adapted to express it. The Modernism is associated to the parnasianism with sculpture; to the symbolism with music. It does not have to be understood that between the one and other there is an unsalvable border; on the contrary, if in some modernist writers, like José Santos Chocano and Guillermo Valencia, the cult to the form predominates, in others, like Leopoldo Lugones and Antonio Machado, a preference for the intimism can be seen. And still it must be remembered that the symbolism of which it is spoken is not only consequence of the French symbolism of the Eighties; even if coming from there in the initial impulse, and although the vocabulary and the subject matter of the Modernists was impregnated by those of the French symbolists, the Spanish Modernists did not take much time in assimilating also the symbolism of the poets of English language, and still the one of San Juan the de la Cruz as well.

It cannot surprise that in the general current of Modernism diverse tendencies come together, some times complementary, some times contradictory, because thus it has to be, fundamentally, any historical period, be the Renaissance, the Romanticism, or the Modernism. And those diversities and antagonisms occur inside men, and not only between men. Divided, in struggle with the others and with themselves, denying with the reason what the feeling postulates, the top figures of the Modernism, who better represented it (Rubén Darío or Miguel de Unamuno) lived in anguish, if not in desperation. These two feelings, much more than the swans and the princesses, mere occasional ornamentation, constitute the most arduous legacy of the Modernists to their heirs and successors.

== Some authors ==
=== Miguel de Unamuno ===
Miguel de Unamuno (1864–1936) was an essayist, novelist, poet, playwright and philosopher from Spain. In his works he cultivated a great variety of literary genres.

=== Rubén Darío ===
Félix Rubén García Sarmiento (1867–1916) was a Nicaraguan poet who wrote under the pseudonym of Rubén Darío. His poetry brought vigor to the stale, monotonous Spanish-language poetry of the time.

== Bibliography ==
- Modernismo (Literatura), Enciclopedia Salvat Universal, Salvat Editores, ISBN 84-345-9500-1.
- Silva, José Asunción, Obra completa, Madrid: Ediciones de Centenario. Allca xx, Silva Poetry House, 1996.

== See also ==
- Literature of Spain: evolution of the Spanish literature.
- Modernism: the movement in general.
- Spanish and Italian Modernist Studies Forum at the Pennsylvania State University
