= Security company =

Type of company

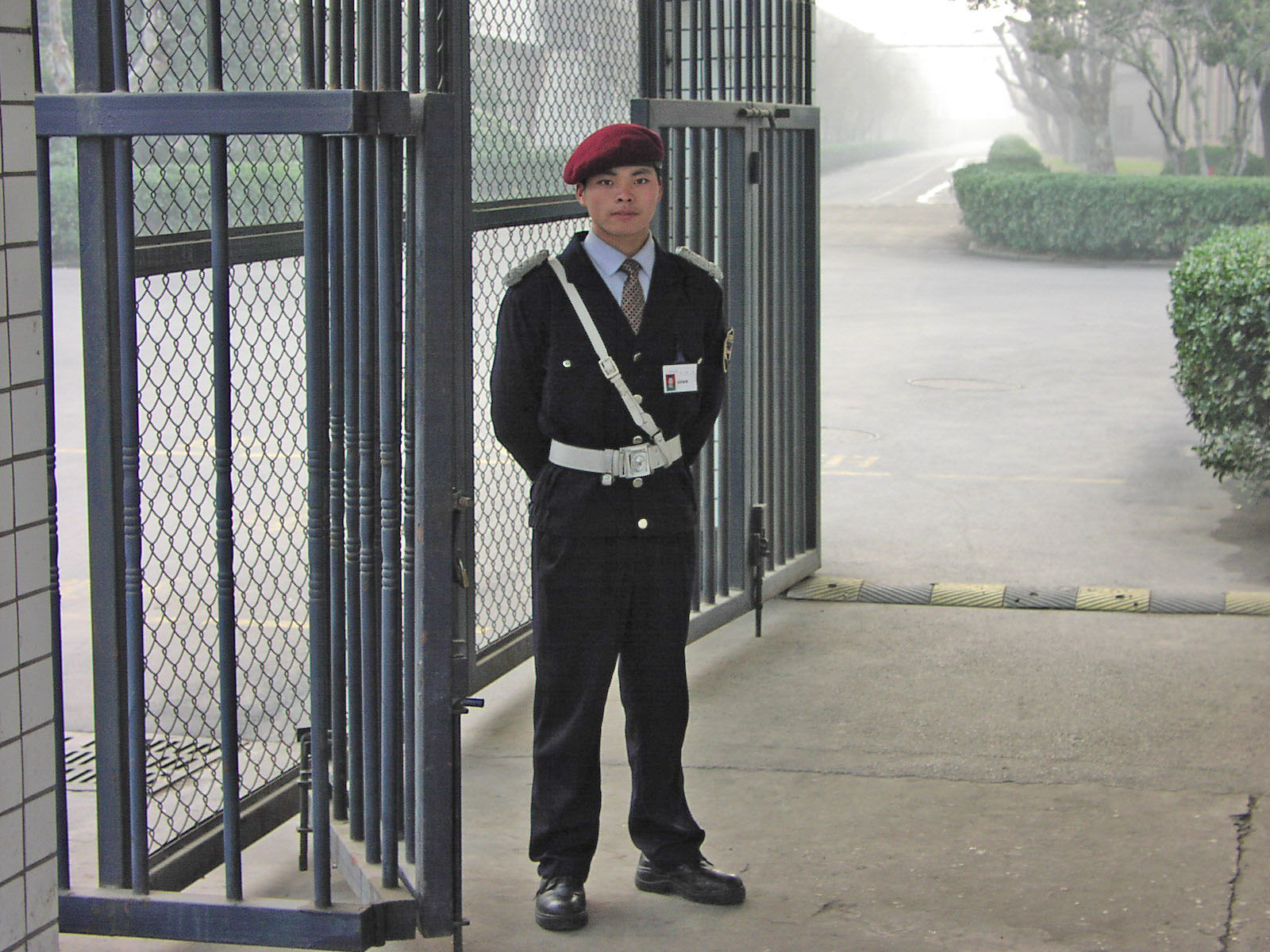
A private security guard on duty at a factory

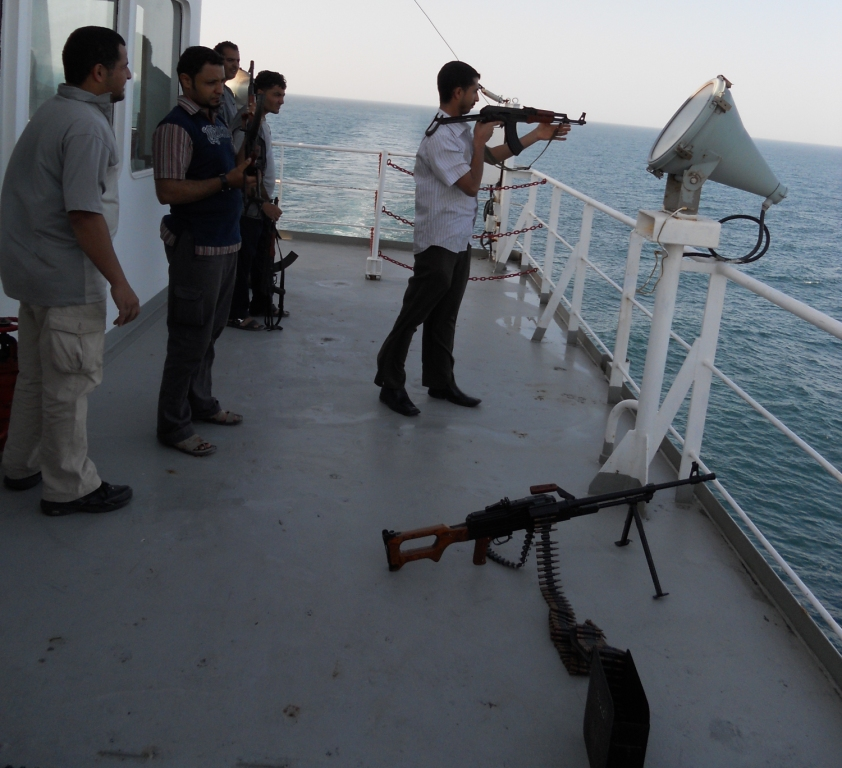
Private guard escort on a merchant ship, providing security services against pirates

A private security company is a business entity which provides armed or unarmed security services and expertise to clients in the private or public sectors.

== Overview ==
Private security companies are defined by the U.S. Bureau of Labor Statistics as companies primarily engaged in providing guard and patrol services, such as bodyguard, guard dog, parking security and security guard services. Many of them will even provide advanced special operations services if the client demands it. Examples of services provided by these companies include the prevention of unauthorized activity or entry, traffic regulation, access control, and fire and theft prevention and detection. These services can be broadly described as the protection of personnel and/or assets. Other security services such as roving patrol, bodyguard, and guard dog services are also included, but are a very small portion of the industry. During the COVID-19 pandemic, some security companies engaged in vaccine supply chain services as well.

The private security industry is rapidly growing – currently there are 2 million full-time security workers in the United States and this number is expected to increase by 21% percent through 2020, making the security industry a $100 billion a year industry, with projected growth to $200 billion by 2010. The United States is the world's largest consumer of private military and security services, and the private security industry in the U.S. began seeing a huge increase in demand in 2010. Since then, the U.S. security industry has already grown to be a $350 billion market.

== General terms ==
Employees of private security companies are generally referred to either as "security guards" or "security officers", depending on the laws of the state or country they operate in. Security companies themselves are sometimes referred to as "security contractors", but this is not common due to confusion with private military contractors, who operate under a different auspice.

== See also ==
- Bodyguard
- Computer security
- Private Security Company Association of Iraq
- Private military company
- Private defense agency
- Private army
- List of private security companies
- Security guard
- Physical security
- Private police
- Private security industry in South Africa
- Security information and event management
