= List of mines in Russia =

This list of mines in Russia is subsidiary to the list of mines article and lists working, defunct and future mines in the country organized by primary mineral output. For practical reasons, this list also contains stone, marble and other quarries.

== Antimony ==
- Sentachan mine

== Bentonite ==
- Liublinskaya mine

== Beryllium ==
- Yermakovsky mine

== Chromium ==
- Aganozersky mine
- Shalozersky chromium mine

== Coal ==
- Chulmakansky coal mine
- Khangalassky coal mine
- Listvianskaya coal mine
- Neryungrinsky coal mine
- Pereyaslavskoye coal mine
- Sakhalin coal mine
- Tsentralnyi coal mine
- Tugnui coal mine
- Urgal coal mine
- Usinsky coal mine
- Yubileynaya mine
- Zhernovskoye coal mine

== Cobalt ==
- Karakul deposit

== Copper ==
- Bakr-Tay mine
- Blyavinsky mine
- Central Zhdanovskoye mine
- Degtyarsky mine
- Gaysky mine
- Kirovgradsky mine
- Komsomolsky mine
- Kotselvaara mine
- Lavrovo-Nikolaevsky mine
- Letneye mine
- Mayak mine
- Medvezhy Ruchey mine
- Molodezhny mine
- Oktyabrskoye mine
- Severny mine
- Solnechny mine
- Sorsky mine
- Tash-Tau mine
- Taymyrsky mine
- Turyinsky mine
- Uchalinsky mine
- Urupsky mine
- Uzelginskaya mine
- Vostok mine
- Western Zhdanovskoye mine
- Zapolyarny mine
- Zolotushinsky mine

== Diamonds ==
- Butuobinskaya diamond mine
- Dalnyaya diamond mine
- Ebelyakh diamond mine
- Ebelyakh River diamond mine
- Grib diamond mine
- Internationalnaya diamond mine
- Lomonosov diamond mine
- Maiskoye diamond mine
- Mirny GOK
- Nurbinskaya diamond mine
- Popigai astrobleme mine
- Udachny GOK
- Verkhne-Munskoye diamond mine
- Zarnitsa mine

== Fluorite ==
- Egitinskoye mine
- Garsonuiskoe mine
- Kalanguyskoye mine
- Preobrazhenovskoye mine
- Solonechnoye mine
- Suranskoye mine
- Voznesenka mine
- Yaroslavsky mine

== Gold ==
- Albazino mine
- Bystrinskoye mine
- Gora Rudnaya mine
- Kultumin mine
- Kyuchus mine
- Nezhdaninka mine
- Omolon mine
- Pioneer mine
- Sukhoi Log mine
- Taseevskoye mine

== Graphite ==
- Ulur mine

== Iron ==
- Abakanskoye mine
- Aldan mine
- Bakal mine
- Bakcharskoye mine
- Belokitatskoye mine
- Berezov mine
- Berezovskoye mine
- Bugdai mine
- Chara mine
- Dyosovskoye mine
- Enashiminskoye mine
- Gar mine
- Gorlovsky coal mine
- Gornaya Shoriya mine
- Gusevogoroskoye mine
- Gusevogorskoye mine
- Inskoye mine
- Itmatinskoye mine
- Karasugskoye mine
- Karelsky Okatysh mine
- Kavakta mine
- Kharlovskoye mine
- Kholzunskoye mine
- Korpanga mine
- Kostomuksha mine
- Kuznetsky Alatau mine
- Lebedinskiy mine
- Mikhaylovskiy mine
- Milkanskoye mine
- Nizhne-Angarskoye mine
- Olekma mine
- Olimpiyskoye mine
- Prioskolsky mine
- Sheregesh mine
- Sobstvenno-Kachkanarskoye mine
- Sukha Balka mine
- Tarynnakh mine
- Teiskoye mine
- Timir mine
- Toyozhnoye mine
- Turukhanskoye mine
- Tyya mine
- Yakovlevsky mine
- Yuzhno Khingan mine

== Lead ==
- Kholodninsky mine
- Kyzyl-Tash Turk mine
- Noyon-Tologoisky mine
- Ozyorny mine
- Safyanovskoe mine

== Lithium ==
- Alakhinskoye mine
- Vishnyakovskoe mine

== Manganese ==
- Usinskoe mine

== Mercury ==
- Aktashskoye mine
- Terligkhaiskoye mine

== Molybdenum ==
- Agaskyrskoe mine
- Bugdai mine
- Bugdainskoe mine
- Lobash mine
- Metrekskoye mine
- Sorsk mine
- Zharchikhinski mine
- Zhireken mine

== Nickel ==
- Aganozersky mine
- Kingash mine
- Kun-Manie mine
- Maslovskoye mine
- Shalozersky mine
- Verkhnekingashskoye mine

== Niobium ==
- Gornoye Ozero mine

== Phosphates ==
- Oleniy Ruchey mine
- Selemdzha mine
- Selgdarsky mine
- Tomtor mine

== Potash ==
- Synnyr mine
- Talitsky mine

== Silver ==
- Bugdai mine
- Derbeke-Nelgesinsky mine
- Karakul deposit
- Khotoidokh mine
- Lunnoye mine
- Mangazeisky mine
- Prognoz mine
- Taryno-Kurdatsky mine

== Tantalum ==
- Etykinskoye mine
- Katuginskoy mine
- Orlovskoye mine
- Ulug-Tanzekskoye mine
- Voznesenovskoye mine

== Tin ==
- Pyrkakay mine

== Titanium ==
- Pudozhsky mine
- Ruchar mine
- Yugo-Vostochnaya Gremyakha mine

== Tungsten ==
- Lednikovy-Sarmaka mine
- Urzarsaiskoye mine

== Uranium ==
- Dalmatovkoye mine
- Elkon mine
- Khiagdinskoye mine
- Olovskoye mine

== Vanadium ==
- Padma mine

== Zinc ==
- Kholodninsky mine
- Kyzyl-Tash Turk mine
- Noyon-Tologoisky mine
- Ozyorny mine
