= Voznesenka =

Voznesenka may refer to:

- Voznesenka, Alaska
- Voznesenka, Donetsk Oblast
- Voznesenka, Birsky District, Republic of Bashkortostan
- Voznesenka, Uchalinsky District, Republic of Bashkortostan
- Voznesenka, Buzdyaksky District, Republic of Bashkortostan
- Voznesenka, Duvansky District, Republic of Bashkortostan
- Voznesenka, Iglinsky District, Republic of Bashkortostan
- Voznesenka, Voronezh Oblast
- Voznesenka, Rodinsky District, Altai Krai
- Voznesenovka, Kyrgyzstan
- Voznesenka mine
