= Ulug =

Ulug may refer to:

== People ==
- Derya Uluğ (born 1986), Turkish singer
- İsmet Uluğ (1901–1975), Turkish boxer and footballer
- Master Ulug, Uyghur Manichaean missionary
- Mehmet Uluğ (1959–2013), Turkish businessman
- Yağızer Uluğ (born 1972), Turkish basketball coach

== Other uses ==
- Ulug Depe, ancient Bronze Age site in Turkmenistan
- Ulug-Khemsky District, district in Russia
- Ulug-Tanzekskoye mine, mine in Russia
- Ulug Orda (disambiguation), multiple topics
- Ulug Ulus (disambiguation), multiple topics
