= Kyzyl-Tash =

Kyzyl-Tash may refer to several places in Russia:

- Kyzyl-Tash, Altai Republic
- Kyzyl-Tash, Republic of Bashkortostan
- Kyzyl-Tash Turk mine

== See also ==
- Kyzyltash
- Kyzyl Tash, a village that is now part of Andriivka, Myrne settlement hromada, Volnovakha Raion, Donetsk Oblast
