= Kyzyltash =

Kyzyltash may refer to:

- Kyzyltash, Russia

== See also ==
- Kyzyl-Tash (disambiguation)
