= Gučevo (disambiguation) =

Gučevo is a mountain in western Serbia.

Gučevo may also refer to:

- Gučevo (Rogatica), a village in Bosnia and Herzegovina
- FK Loznica, formerly Gučevo football club

== See also ==
- Gusevogoroskoye mine, Russia
