= Talnakh =

Talnakh Талнах
- District
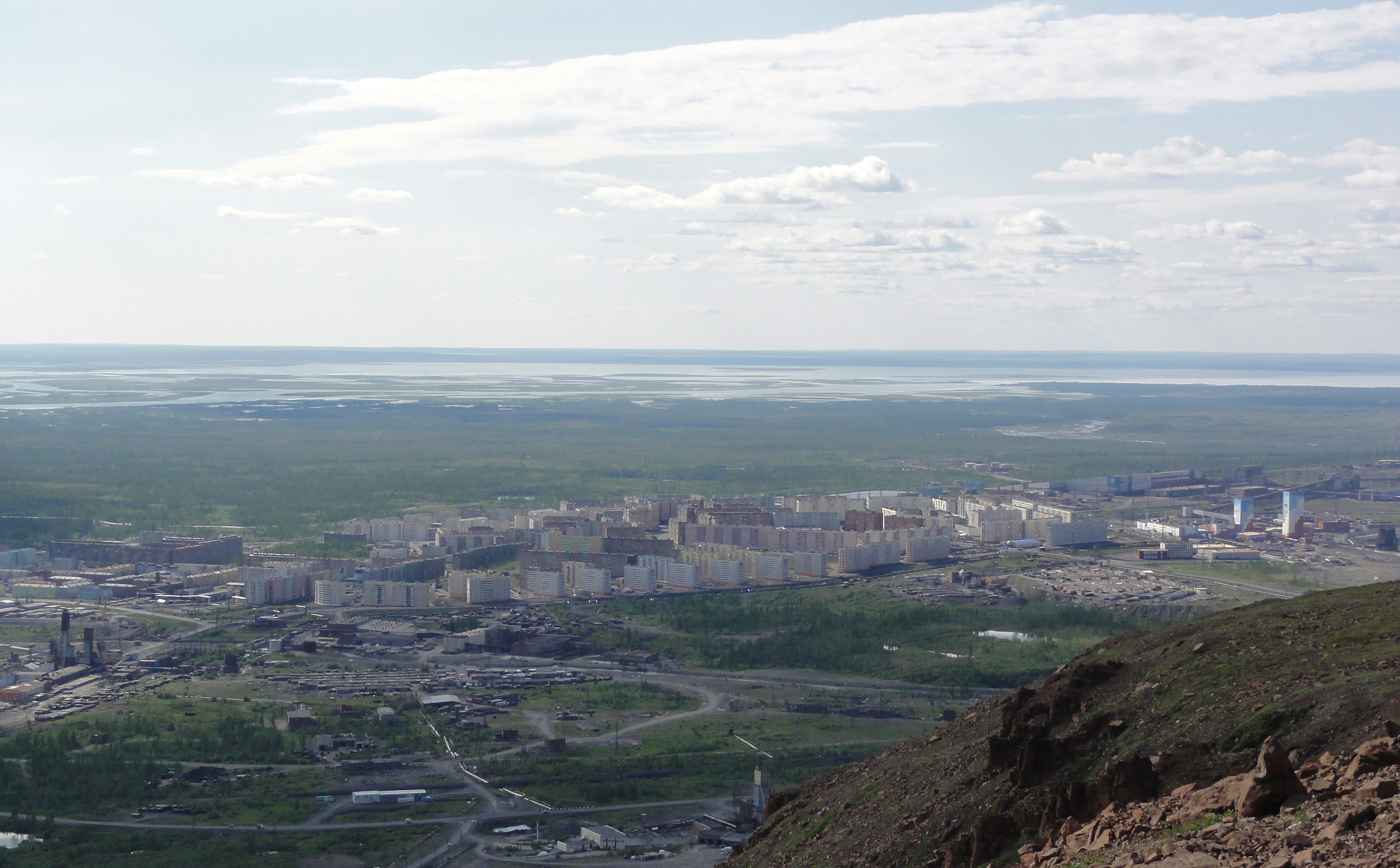
- Panoramic view of Talnakh

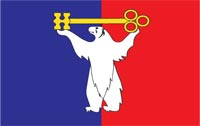
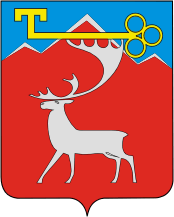
- Flag Coat of arms
- Interactive map of Talnakh
- Location of Talnakh Talnakh (Krasnoyarsk Krai)
- Coordinates: 69°30′N 88°24′E
- Country: Russia
- Federal subject: Krasnoyarsk Krai
- Founded: 1960

Population (2010 Census)
  - Total: 47,307
  - Estimate (2021): 47,216 (−0.2%)

Administrative status
  - Subordinated to: krai city of Norilsk
  - Capital of: krai city of Norilsk

Municipal status
  - Urban okrug: Norilsk Urban District
  - Capital of: Norilsk Urban District
- Postal codes: 663330, 663332, 663333
- Website: www.norilsk-city.ru

Talnakh (Russian: Тална́х, IPA: [tɐɫˈnax]) is a district (raion) of Norilsk, located about 25 kilometers (16 mi) north of the Central District at the foot of the Putorana Mountains in Taymyr Peninsula, Krasnoyarsk Krai, Russia. Formerly a town, it was merged into Norilsk as a satellite city in 2005. Population: 47,216 (2021 census);

It is the site of the mines serving the production of nickel and other metals in Norilsk's metallurgical industry. The mineral talnakhite is named after Talnakh.

== History ==
=== Prehistoric and Indigenous Era ===
Archaeological excavations near Lake Pyasino indicate human presence in the Norilsk–Talnakh region as early as the Bronze Age, with discoveries of primitive copper-smelting furnaces and native copper artifacts. These finds correspond to a distinct “Pyasina” metallurgical tradition that developed on the Taymyr Peninsula in the late first millennium BCE.

The broader area around modern Talnakh historically belonged to the migratory territories of the Nenets, Dolgans, Nganasans, and Evenks, who practiced reindeer herding and hunting across the tundra. Evidence shows that Indigenous groups extracted native copper from Talnakh’s surface ore deposits and traded it to Russian merchants at the Arctic outpost of Mangazeya during the 16th–17th centuries.

=== Imperial Russian Period ===
In the 17th and 18th centuries, Russian promyshlenniks and explorers, including Alexander Middendorff and Khariton Laptev, passed through the Taimyr region, though no permanent settlement was founded in the Talnakh area. Administratively, the territory belonged to the northern parts of the Yenisei Governorate, but Indigenous peoples maintained considerable autonomy under the 1822 “Statute on Indigenous Administration.” Despite known surface mineralization, the region’s isolation and harsh climate prevented Tsarist-era mining.

=== Soviet Era Development ===
Systematic exploration began in the 20th century. Between 1919 and 1926, Soviet geologist Nikolay Urvantsev confirmed rich polymetallic deposits around Norilsk, laying groundwork for later development.

In 1935, the Norilsk Mining-Metallurgical Combine was created, relying heavily on the labor of prisoners from the Norillag Gulag camp, thousands of whom perished constructing mines and smelters in extreme Arctic conditions.

==== Discovery of the Talnakh Ore Field ====
By the late 1950s, prospecting moved north of Norilsk. In 1960, Soviet geologists discovered the Talnakh ore field, containing exceptionally rich nickel–copper–PGE deposits. The Oktyabrskoye and Talnakhskoye deposits became known as some of the largest and highest-grade magmatic sulfide ore bodies in the world.

Construction began almost immediately. The Talnakh settlement was established in the early 1960s to serve the new mines. The first major shafts—Mayak and Komsomolsky—were built beginning in 1963–1964, staffed in part by Komsomol youth brigades.

In March 1971, Talnakh ore was first transported to Norilsk’s smelters. By the 1970s, Talnakh had become integral to the Norilsk industrial complex, leading to the construction of the Nadezhda Metallurgical Plant (1971–1981), designed to process the increasing ore output.

Talnakh grew rapidly: it became an urban district of Norilsk in 1970 and gained city status under Norilsk’s administration in 1982.

=== Environmental and Social Conditions ===
Pollution from mining and smelting around Norilsk and Talnakh has caused severe environmental degradation throughout the Soviet period. Emissions of sulfur dioxide and heavy metals damaged large areas of tundra and affected Indigenous herding routes.

=== Post-Soviet and Modern Period ===
After 1991, the Norilsk industrial complex was privatized, forming Nornickel in 1995. Economic restructuring led to population decline, though Talnakh remained the primary mining district of Norilsk.

In 2005, Talnakh’s municipal status was abolished and it was formally merged into the city of Norilsk under Federal Law No. 66-FZ.

==== Modernization and Environmental Issues ====
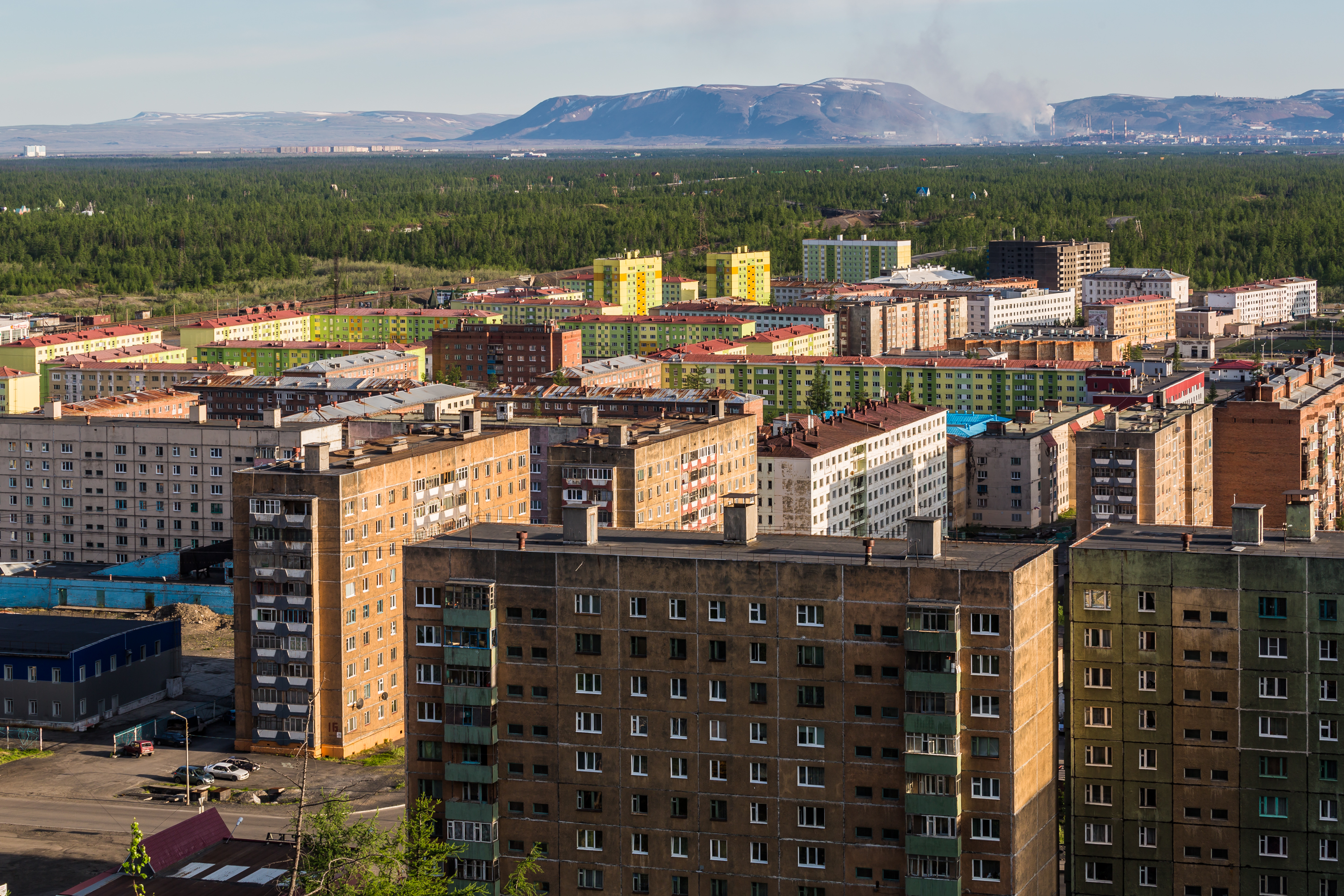
Khrushchyovka in Talnakh.

During the 2010s, Nornickel undertook major modernization efforts in an attempt to improve the Talnakh Concentrator, raising capacity to over 10 million tonnes of ore per year and improving environmental controls.

In 2020, an illegal wastewater discharge from the Talnakh processing plant and a major diesel spill near Norilsk triggered national and international scrutiny.

Today, Talnakh remains one of the world's most productive nickel- and palladium-producing mining districts, playing a central role in the Norilsk industrial region.

== Population ==
Historical population
Year	Pop.	±%
1970	9,286	—
1979	33,410	+259.8%
1989	62,849	+88.1%
2002	58,654	−6.7%
2010	47,307	−19.3%
2021	47,216	−0.2%
Source: Censuses

== Gallery ==
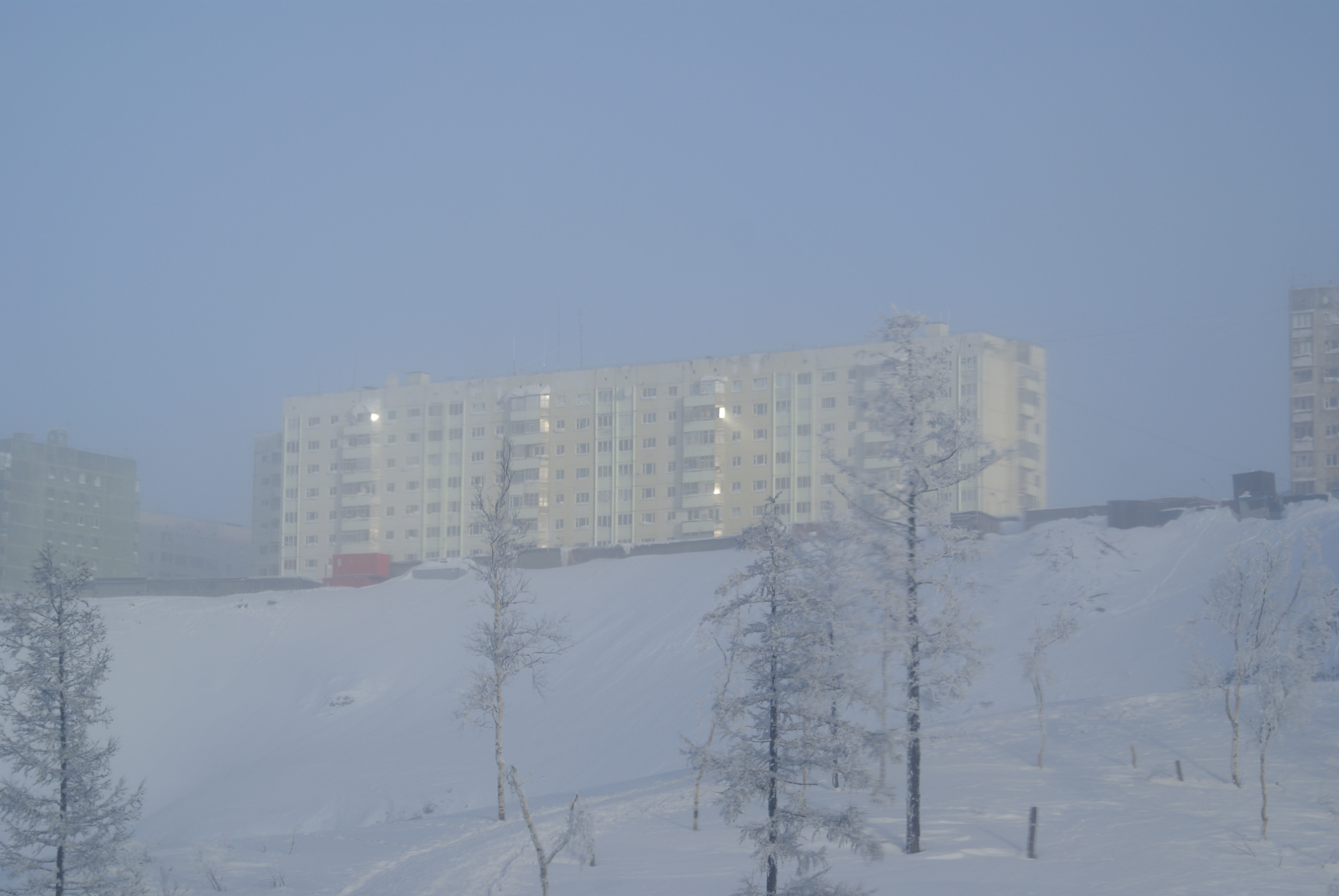
Ulitsa Yeniseiskaya 22

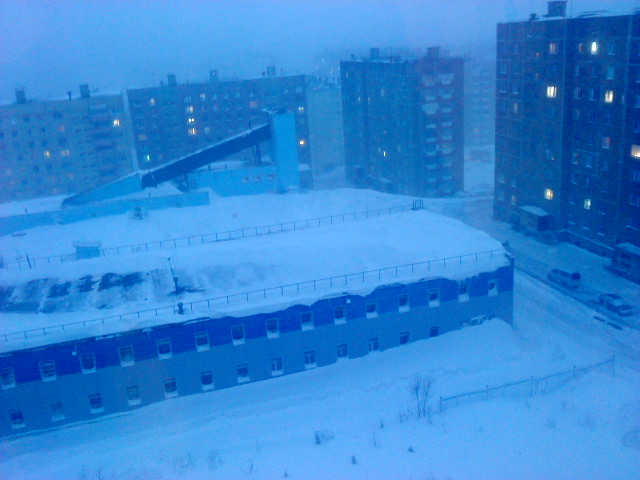
Military Mine Rescue Unit (VGSCh)

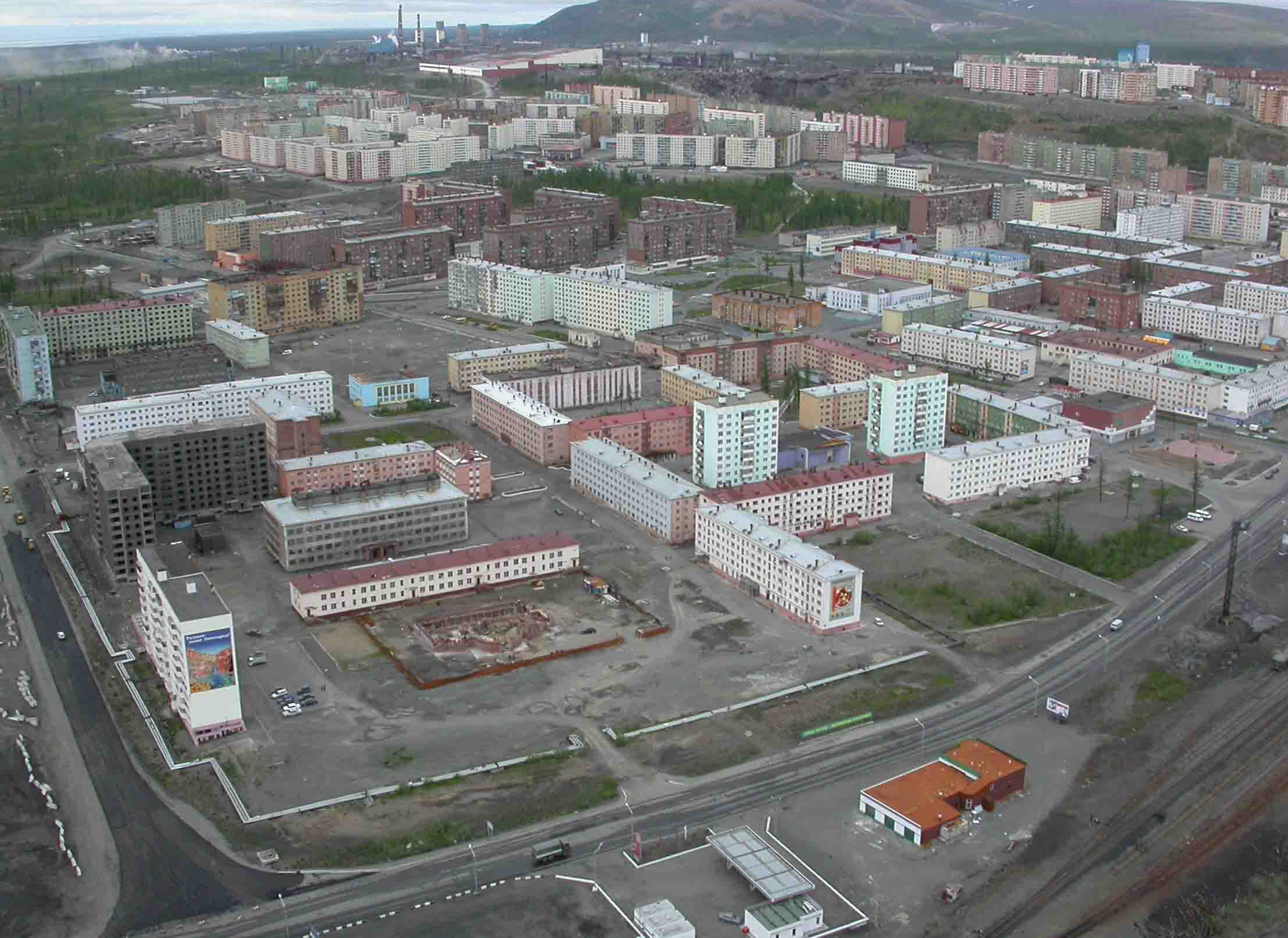
Microdistrict No. 1

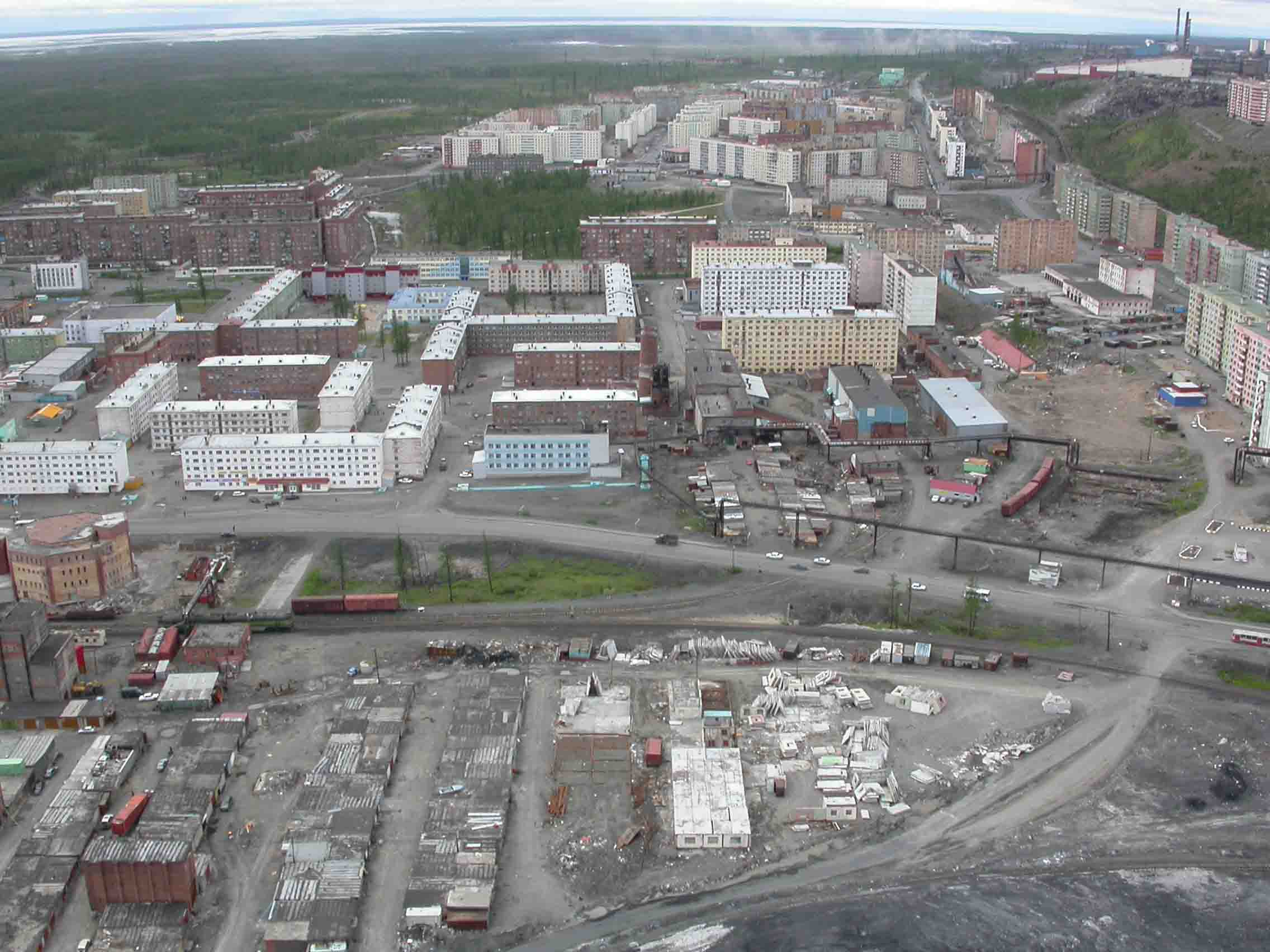
Microdistrict No. 2

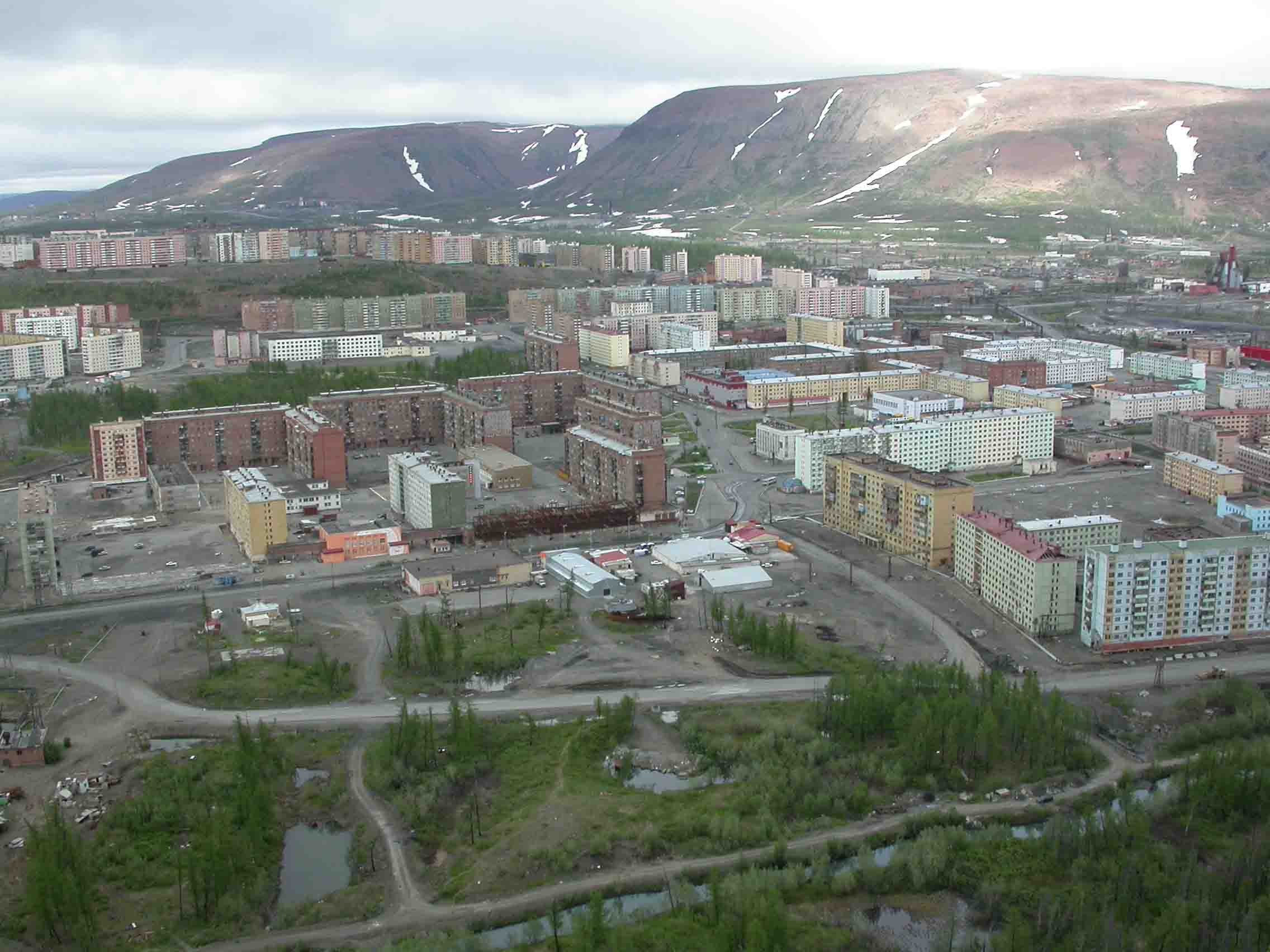
Microdistrict No. 3

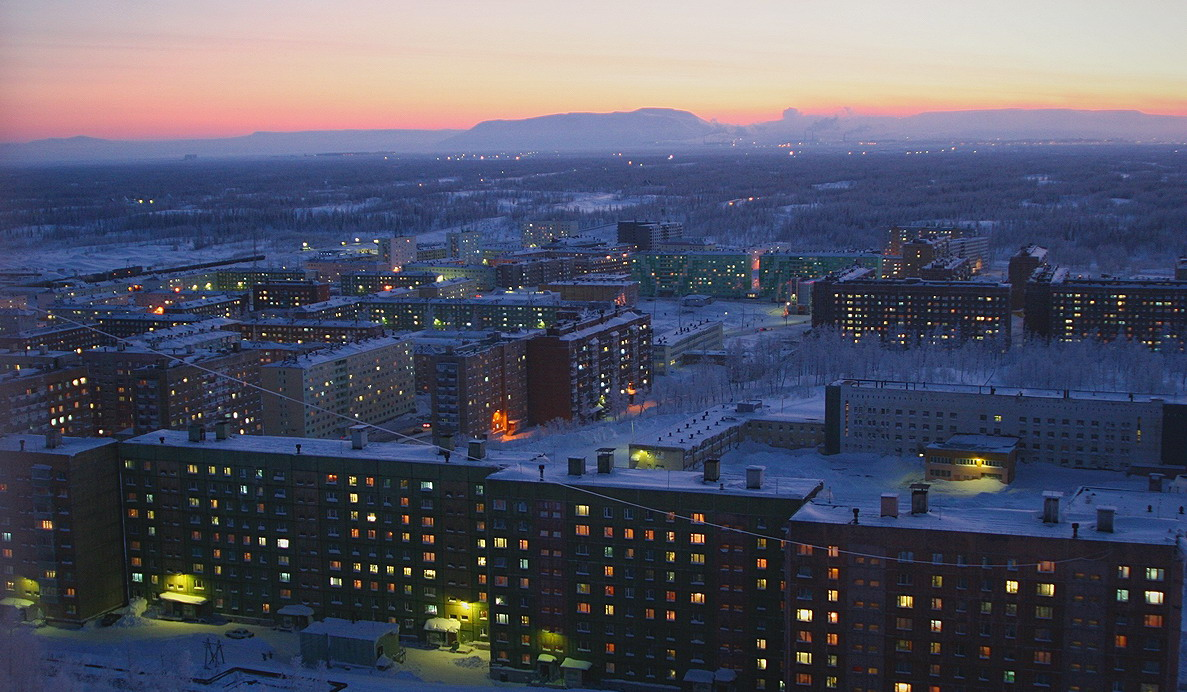
Microdistrict No. 3 in the evening

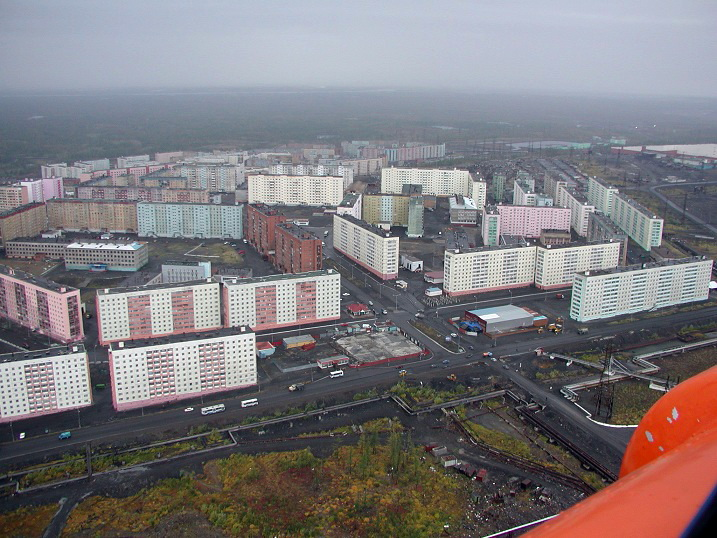
Microdistrict No. 5

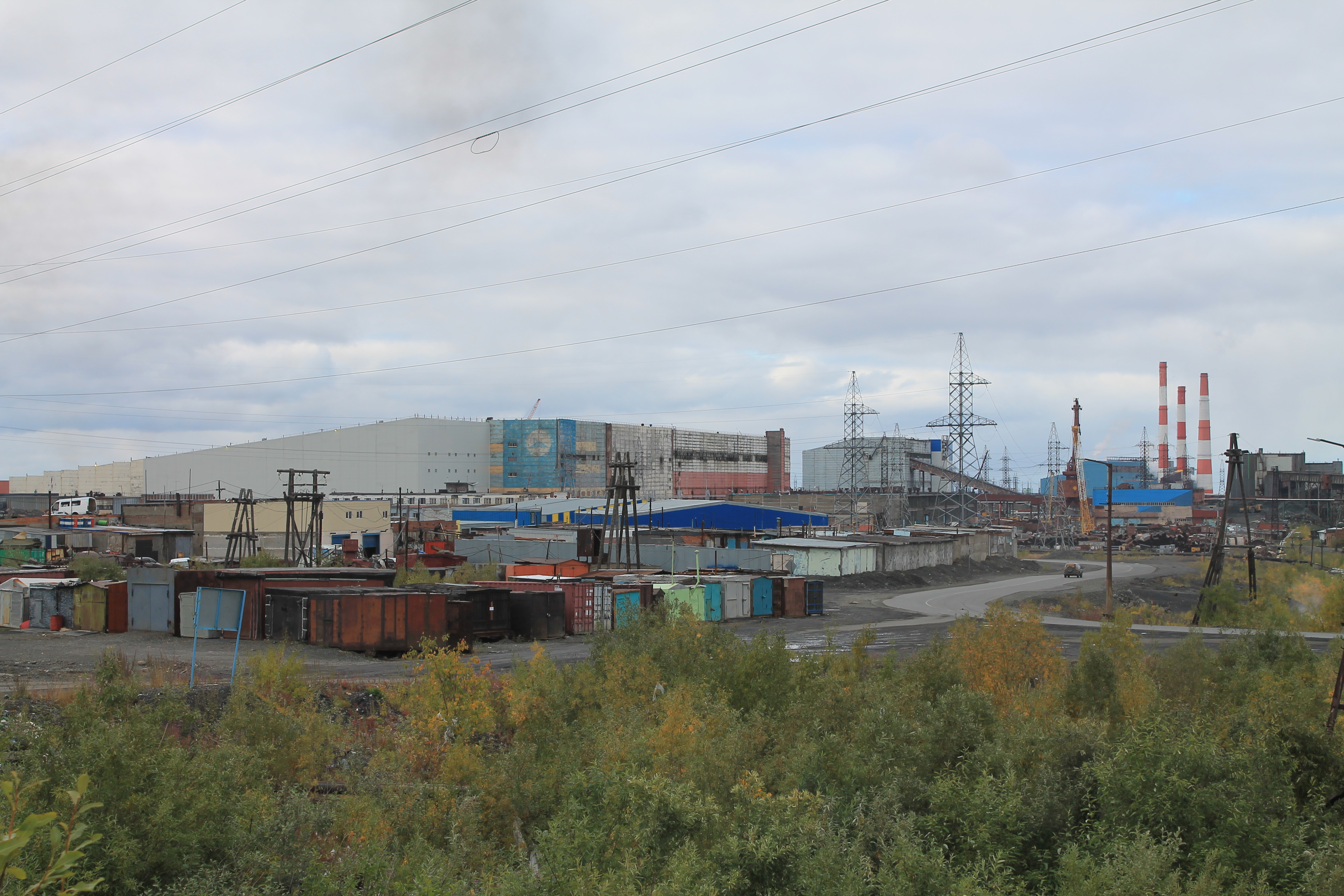
Production Association of Ore Enrichment Plants (POOF)

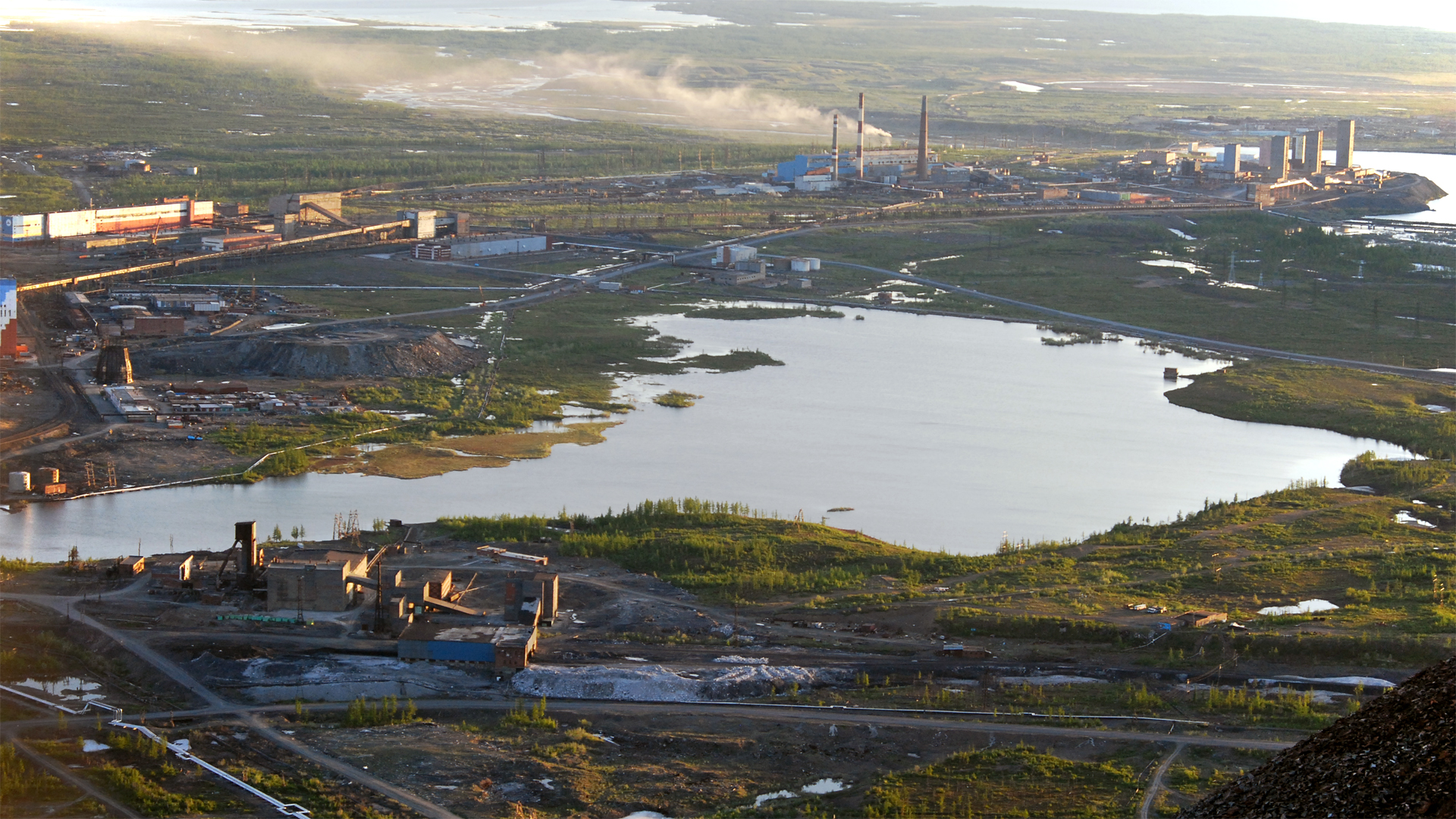
Kyllakh-Kyuyel Lake

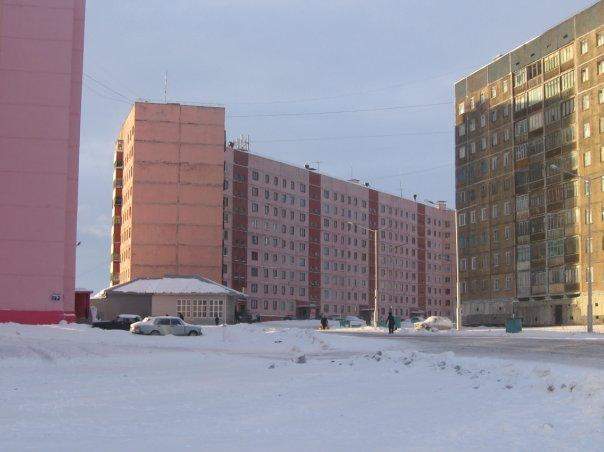
Ulitsa Yeniseiskaya 15 apartment blocks

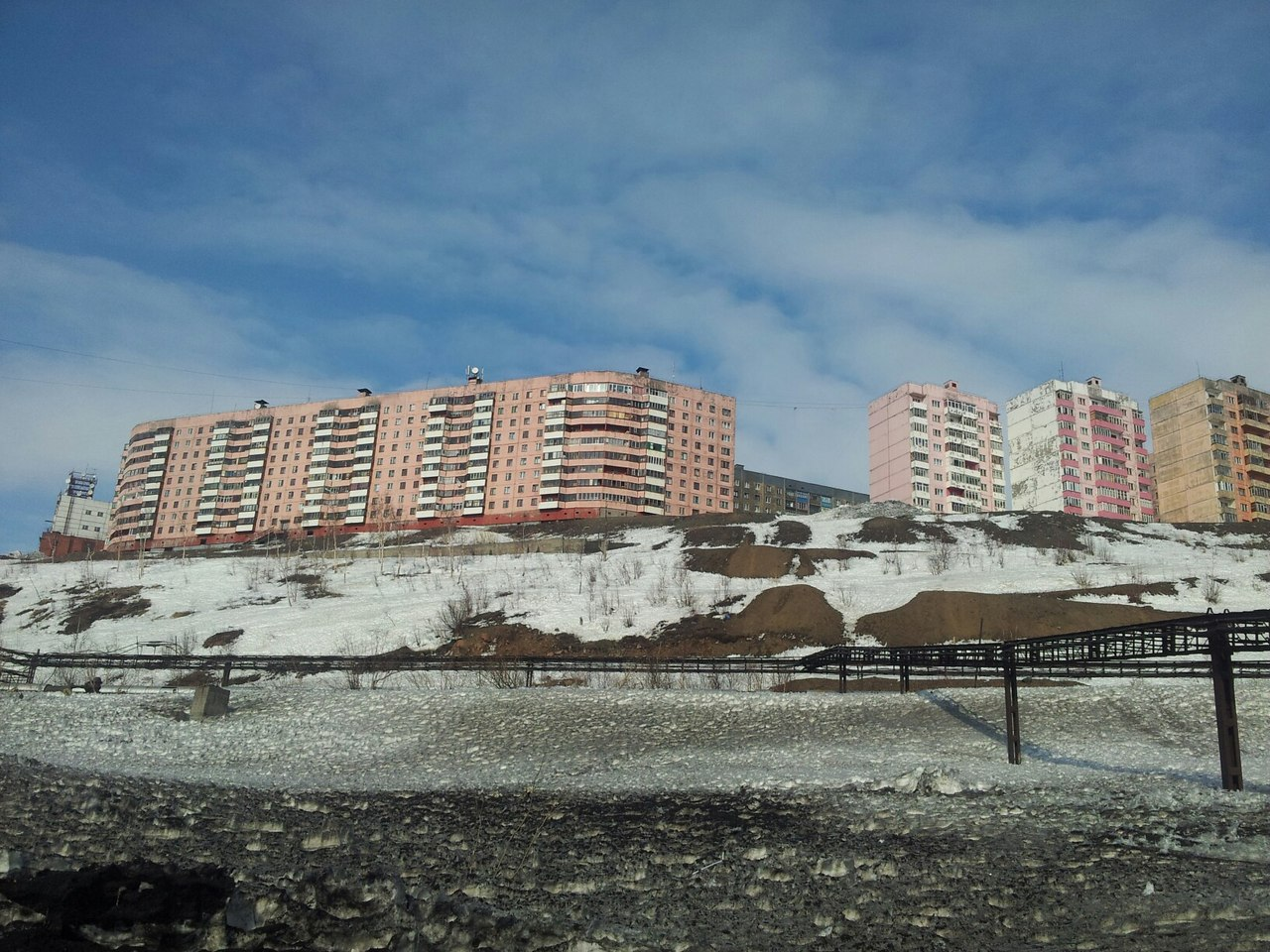
Ulitsa Yeniseiskaya 15

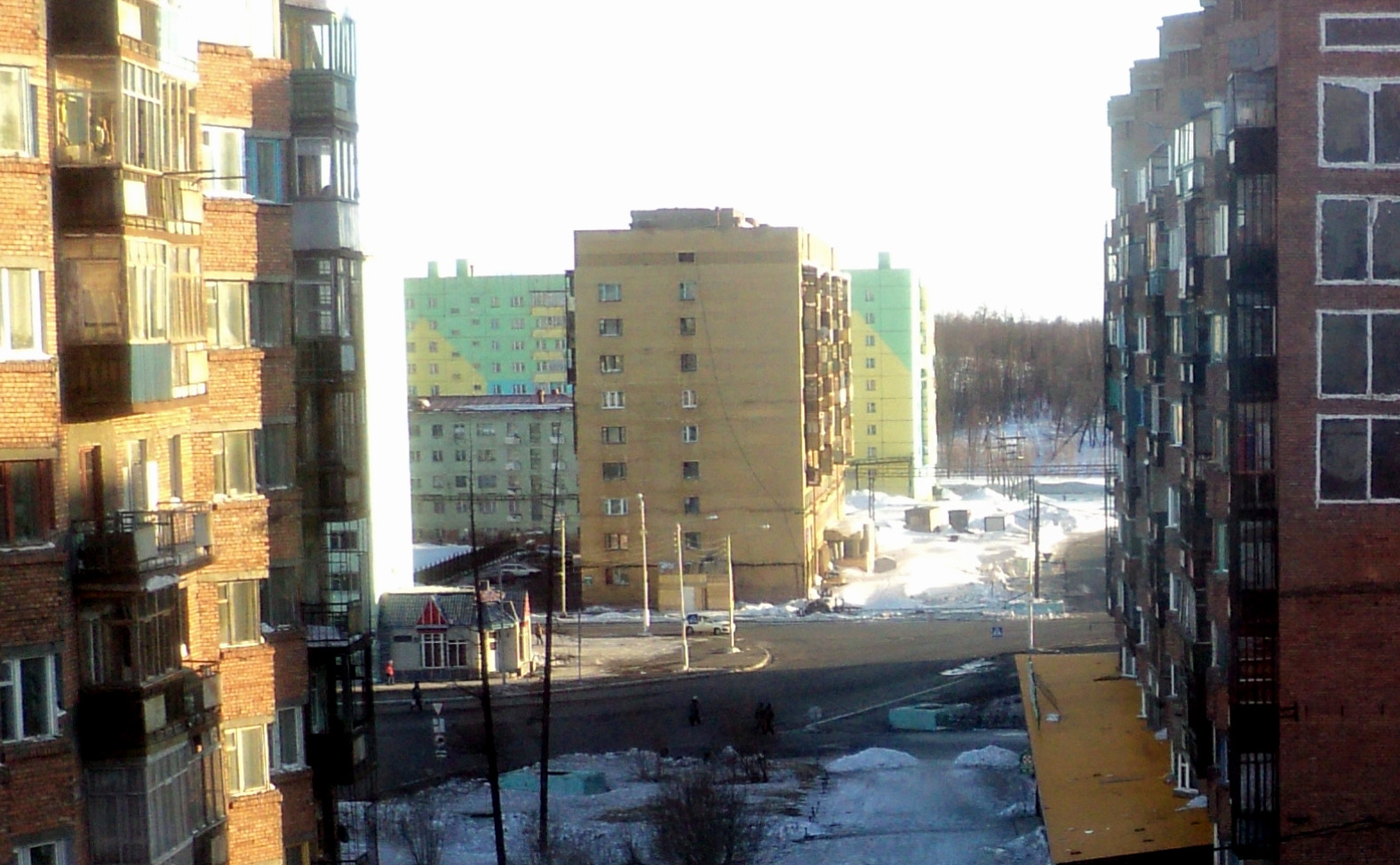
Ulitsa Diksona 6 view outside of an apartment block

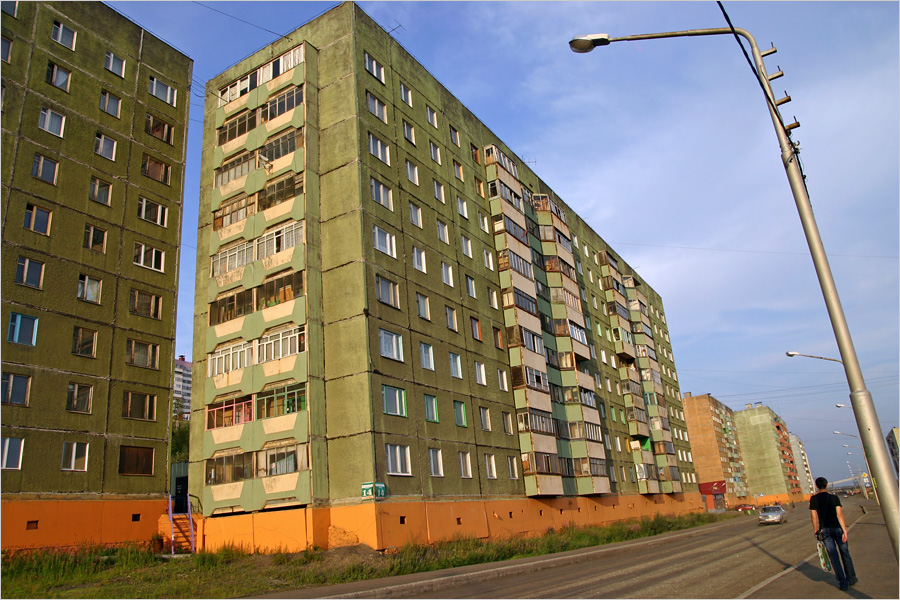
Apartment buildings on Fedorovsky Street 14

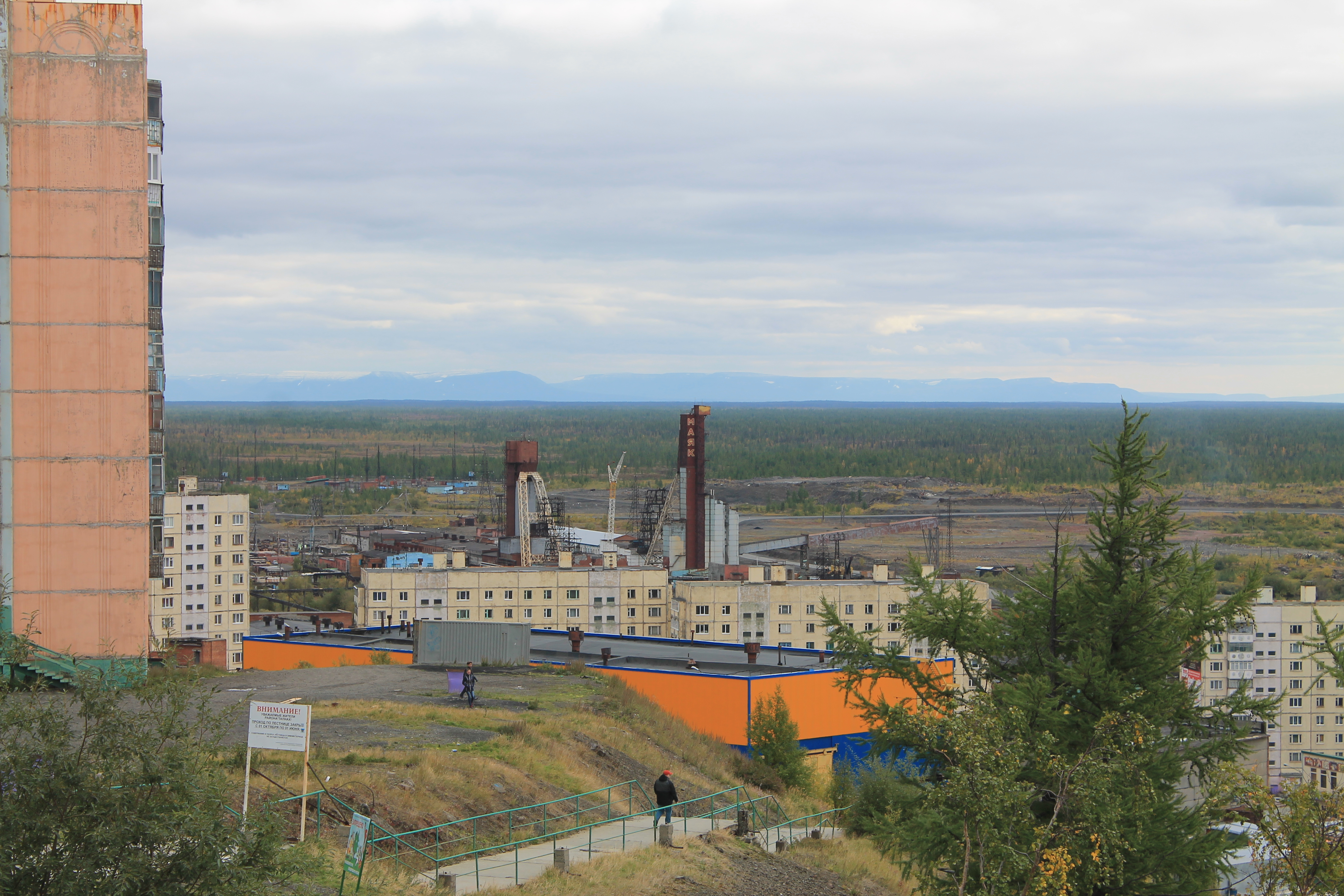
The Mayak shaft of the Komsomolsky mine

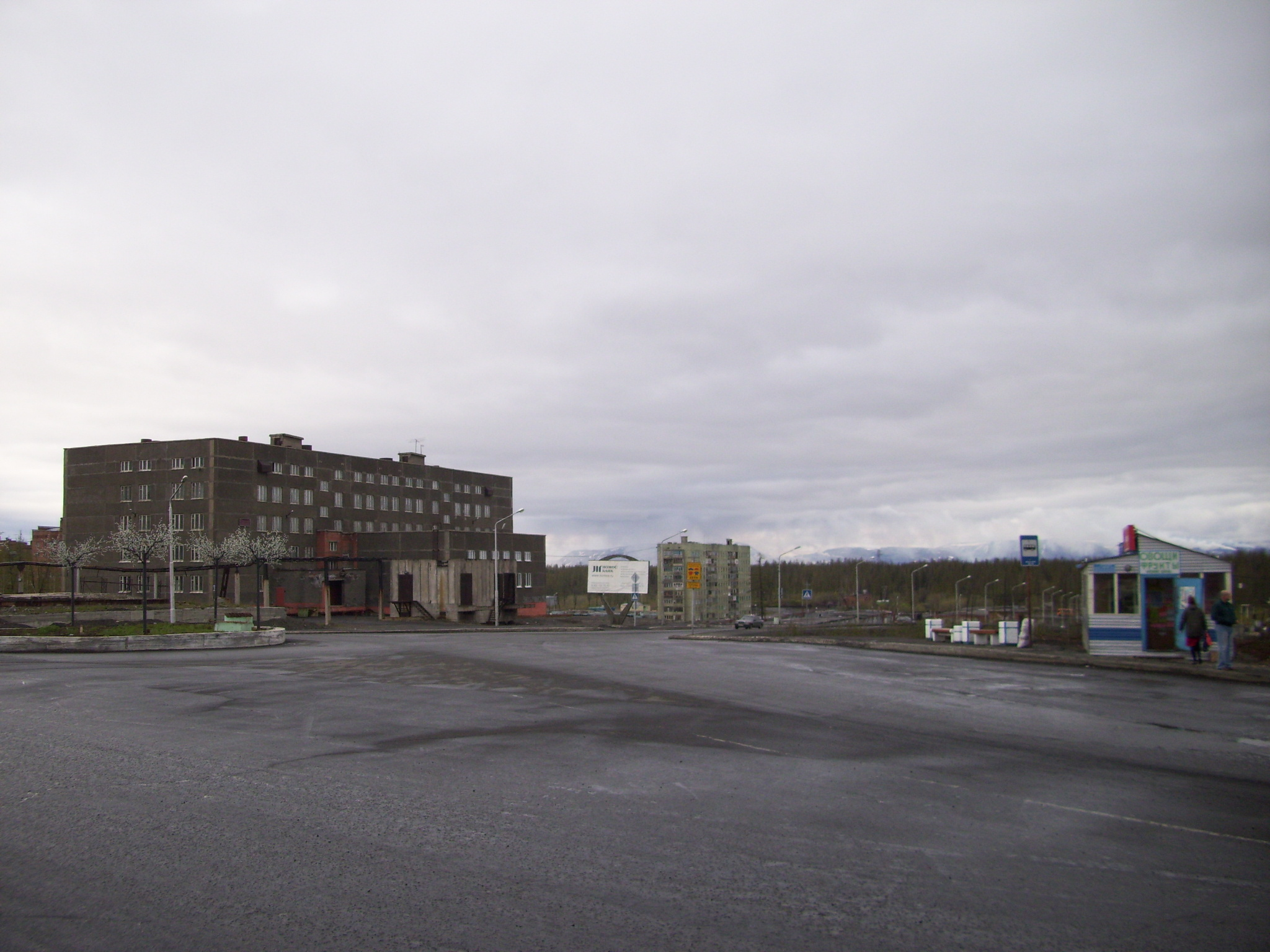
High School No. 48

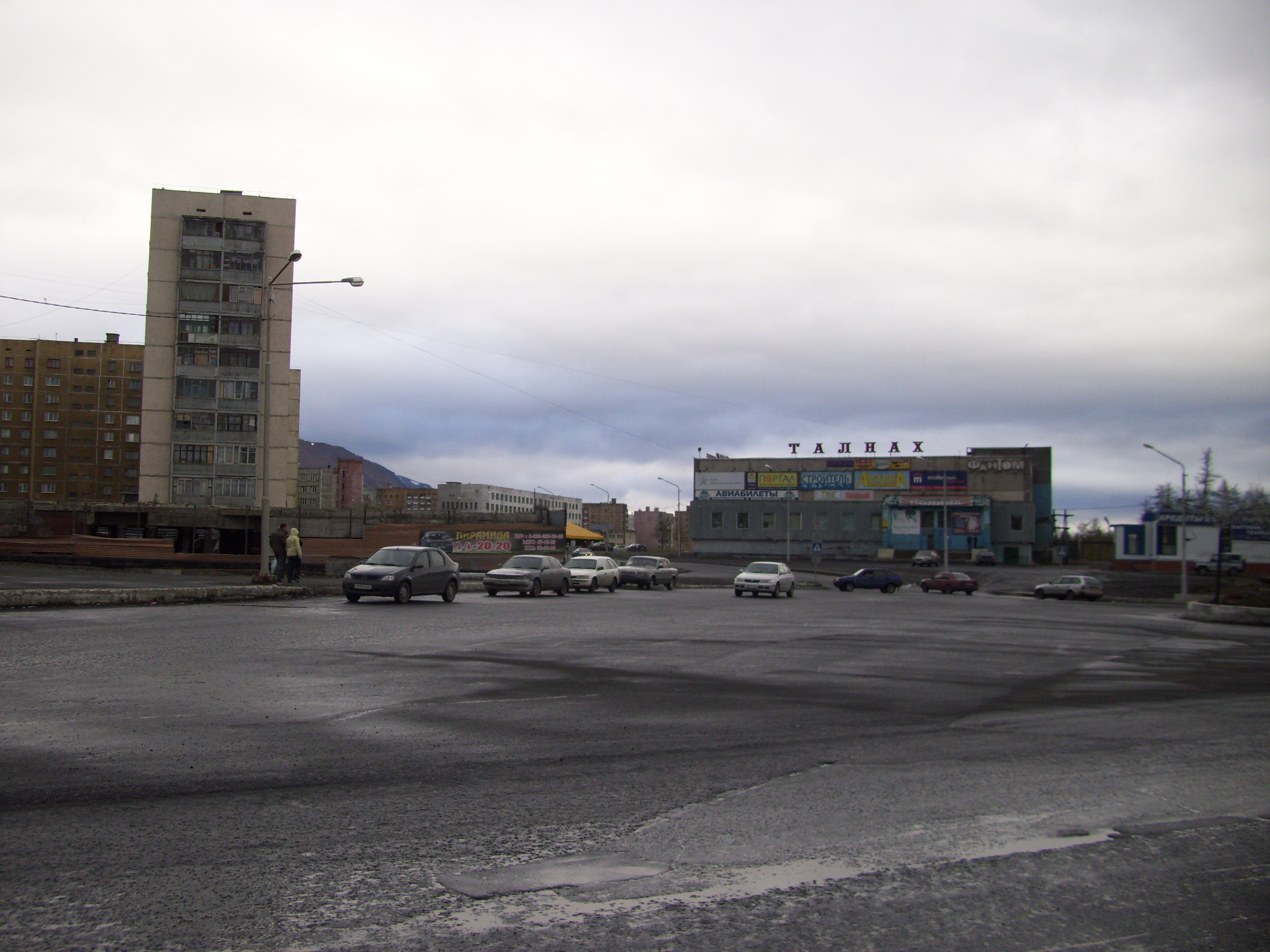
Talnakh Department Store

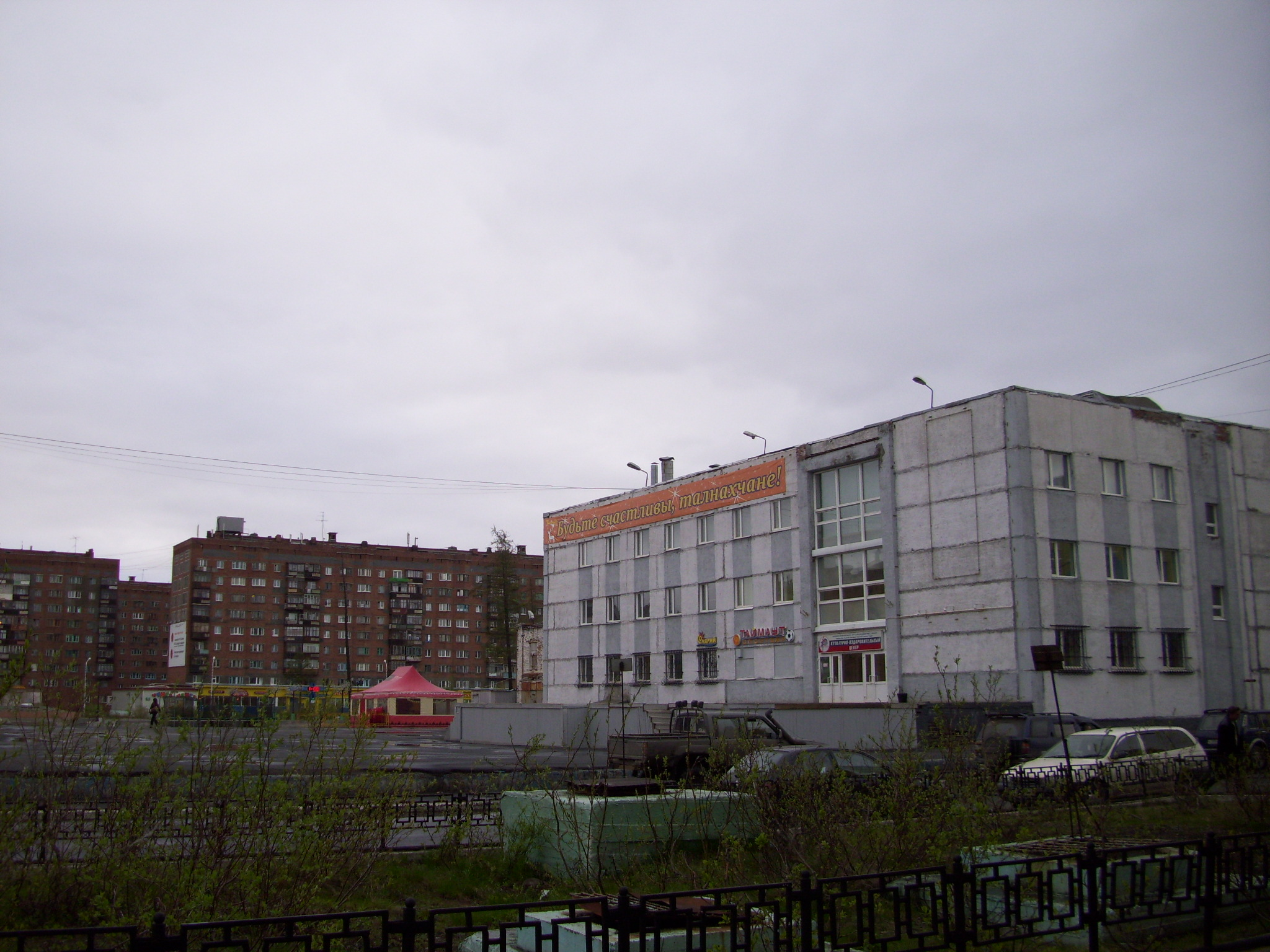
Cultural and health center of the Talnakh sports complex

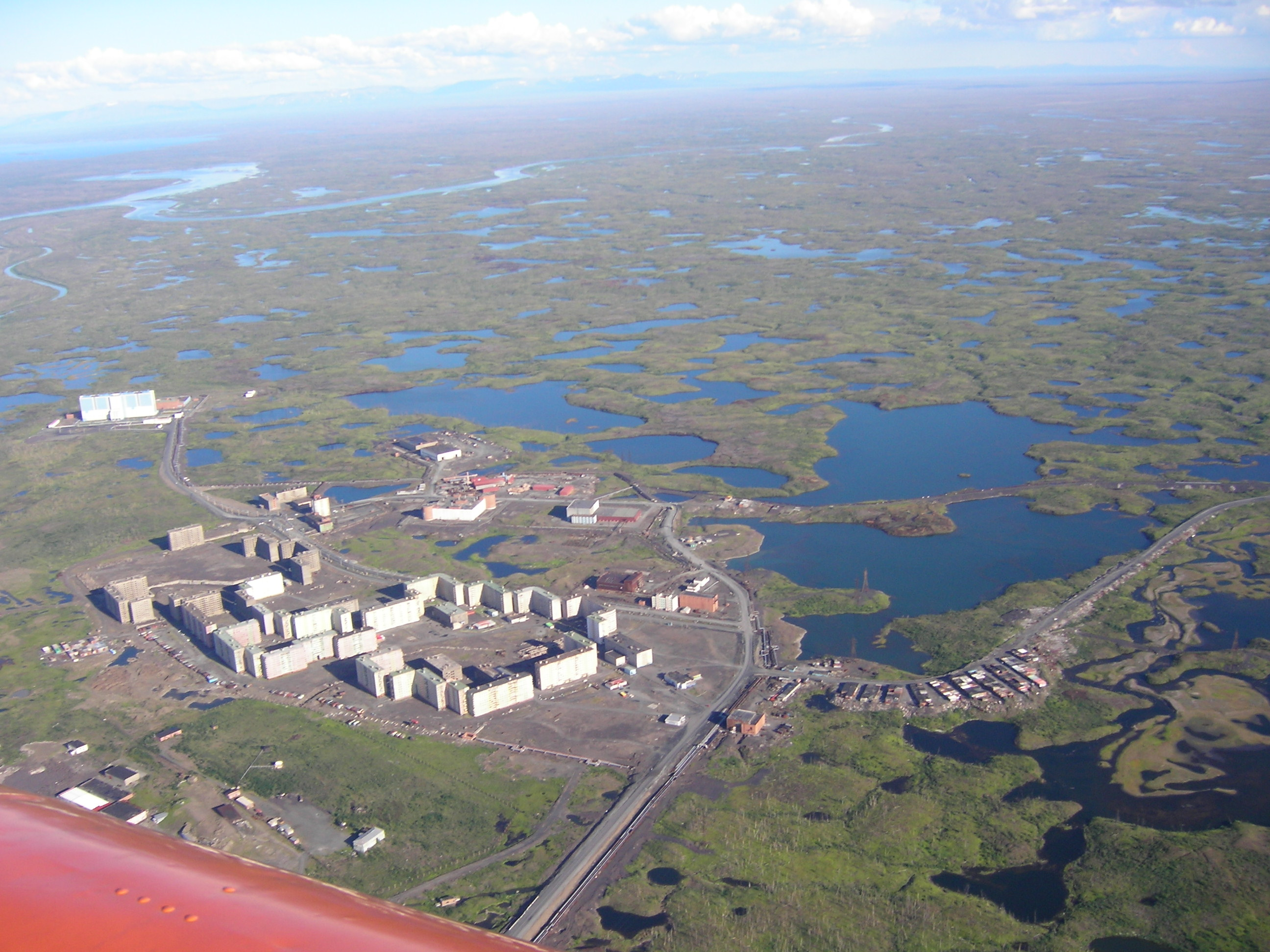
Oganer, an abandoned village near Talnakh and Norilsk

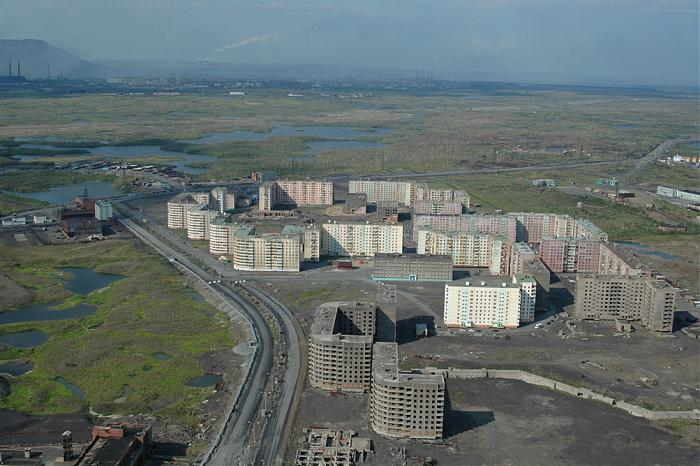
Oganer

== See also ==
- Northernmost settlements
