= Ak-Sugskoye mine =

Copper mine in Russia

Location
- Location: Tuva, Russia

Production
- Products: Copper

The Ak-Sugskoye mine is a large copper mine located in the south of Russia in Tuva. Ak-Sugskoye represents one of the largest copper reserve in Russia and in the world having estimated reserves of 326 million tonnes of ore grading 6.86% copper, 1.78 million oz of gold and 13.6 million oz of silver.

== See also ==
- List of mines in Russia
