= Pudozhsky =

Pudozhsky (masculine), Pudozhskaya (feminine), or Pudozhskoye (neuter) may refer to:

- Pudozhsky District, a district of the Republic of Karelia, Russia
- Pudozhskoye Urban Settlement, a municipal formation which the town of Pudozh and eleven rural localities in Pudozhsky District of the Republic of Karelia, Russia are incorporated as
- Pudozhsky mine, a titanium mine in the Republic of Karelia, Russia
