= Ebelyakh diamond mine =

Russian diamond mine

Ebelyakh mine
- Location within Sakha Republic Location within Russia
- Location: Anabarsky District, Sakha Republic, Russia; 70°56′04″N 113°40′03″E
- Products: diamonds
- Discovered: 1965

The Ebelyakh mine is one of the largest diamond mines in Russia and in the world. The mine is located in the Sakha Republic. The mine has estimated reserves of 25.1 million carats of diamonds and an annual production capacity of 1.5 million carats.

== See also ==
- List of mines in Russia
