= Karakul deposit =

Cobalt deposit in Russia

- Location: Kosh-Agachsky District, Altai Republic, Russia
- Products: Cobalt, Silver
- Company: Global Cobalt
- Website: http://www.globalcobaltcorp.com/projects/russia/

The Karakul deposit is one of the largest cobalt deposits in Russia. The deposit is located in Altai Republic. The deposit has reserves amounting to 180 million tonnes of ore grading 0.33% cobalt, 1.5% copper, 0.11% nickel and bismuth, 0.4% tungsten, 4.6 million oz of gold and 57.6 million oz of silver.

The mineral deposit was discovered by Soviet prospectors in the 1970s. Imperial Mining held a license to develop the field in 2010. It is possibly the world's largest source of primary cobalt outside of Africa. In 2015 it was owned by Global Cobalt. Global Cobalt had conducted a drilling exploration program in 2013, drilling 45 holes, for nearly 7,400 metres, with positive results. Global Cobalt, Imperial Mining Holding Limited and Global Energy Metals Corporation underwent an arrangement transaction in 2016. Global Cobalt retained its option over the Karakul Cobalt Property as its principal property. It also has an option to acquire four other nearby deposits known as the "Altai Sisters" in the Altai Republic. These four properties are Kuruozek, Yantau, Toshtuozek and Olendzhular.

The five deposits are bundled as the proposed Karakul cobalt mine. The proposal would be to export the ore overland to China for processing.

== Altai Sisters ==
Global Cobalt and Imperial Mining Holding also have interests in four other exploration targets nearby.

=== Kuruozek ===
The Kuruozek deposit is a cobalt deposit in Altai Republic of Russia. It has reserves amounting to 50 million tonnes of ore grading 0.35% cobalt, 0.5% nickel and 3.2 million oz of gold.

=== Yantau ===
The Yantau deposit is a silver deposit in the Altai Republic of Russia. It has estimated reserves of 288 million oz of silver.

=== Toshtuozek ===
The Toshtuozek deposit is a cobalt deposit in the Altai Republic of Russia. It has reserves amounting to 33 million tonnes of ore grading 0.15% cobalt, 0.6% copper, 0.75% tungsten and 2.11 million oz of gold.

=== Olendzhular ===
The Olendzhular deposit is a cobalt deposit in Altai Republic of Russia. It has reserves amounting to 67 million tonnes of ore grading 0.4% cobalt, 1% copper and 8.57 million oz of gold.

== See also ==
- List of mines in Russia
