= Inskoye mine =

Iron ore mine in Sakha, Russia

- Location: Sakha Republic, Russia
- Products: Iron ore

The Inskoye mine is a large iron mine located in eastern Russia in the Sakha Republic. Inskoye represents one of the largest iron ore reserves in Russia and in the world having estimated reserves of 250 million tonnes of ore grading 45.2% iron metal.

== See also ==
- List of mines in Russia
