= Solnechny mine =

Copper mine in Krasnoyarsk Krai, Russia

- Location: Krasnoyarsk Krai, Russia
- Products: Copper

The Solnechny mine is a large copper mine located in the center of Russia in Krasnoyarsk Krai. Solnechny represents one of the largest copper reserves in Russia and in the world, having estimated reserves of 1.92 billion tonnes of ore grading 1.17% copper.

== See also ==
- List of mines in Russia
