= Omolon mine =

Gold mine in Magadan, Russia

- Interactive map of Omolon mine
- Location: Magadan Oblast, Russia
- Products: Gold

The Omolon mine is one of the largest gold mines in Russia and in the world. The mine is located in Magadan Oblast. The mine has estimated reserves of 4.3 million oz of gold.

== See also ==
- List of mines in Russia
