= Central Zhdanovskoye mine =

Copper mine in Murmansk, Russia

- Interactive map of Central Zhdanovskoye mine

Location
- Location: Murmansk Oblast, Russia

Production
- Products: Copper

The Central Zhdanovskoye mine is a large copper mine located in the north-west of Russia in Murmansk Oblast. Central Zhdanovskoye represents one of the largest copper reserves in Russia as well as in the world, having estimated reserves of 4 billion tonnes of ore grading 0.24% copper.

== See also ==
- List of mines in Russia
