= Kyuchus mine =

Gold mine in Sakha, Russia

The Kyuchus mine is one of the largest gold mines in Russia and the world. The mine is located in Sakha Republic. The mine has estimated reserves of 6.9 million oz of gold.

== See also ==
- List of mines in Russia
