= Zolotushinsky mine =

Copper mine in Altai Krai, Russia

Coordinates: 50°59′29″N 81°26′04″E

- Interactive map of Zolotushinsky mine
- Location: Altai Krai, Russia
- Products: Copper

The Zolotushinsky mine is a large copper mine located in the south of Russia near the village of Gornyak, Altai Krai. Zolotushinsky represents one of the largest copper reserves in Russia and in the world having estimated reserves of 148.5 million tonnes of ore grading 0.79% copper.

== Overview ==
The Zolotushinsky mine, located near the town of Gornyak, Altai Krai in southern Russia, near the border with Kazakhstan. It was first opened in 1751 and the village of Zolotukha was founded nearby. The mine was operational until the mid 19th century before ceasing operation. It resumed operation in 1939, leading to the extablisment of Gornyak in 1942.

It is one of the largest copper deposits in the country and globally, with proven reserves of approximately 148.5 million tonnes of ore grading at 0.79 % copper. Geologically part of the Rudny Altai polymetallic belt, the mine is categorized as a volcanogenic massive sulfide (VMS) deposit and contains significant zinc and lead mineralization alongside copper. The site contributes substantially to Russia’s copper production and is one of several prominent mines in the region, including Zmeinogorsky and Rubtsovsky. Additionally, the mine and its workers have been the subject of recent photographic documentation by Valentin Sidorenko, capturing the daily life and labor conditions in this remote industrial community.

== See also ==
- List of mines in Russia
