= Letneye mine =

Copper mine in Orenburg, Russia

- Location: Orenburg Oblast, Russia
- Products: Copper

The Letneye mine is a large copper mine located in the south-west region of Russia in Orenburg Oblast. Letneye represents one of the largest copper reserve in not only Russia but also in the world having estimated reserves of 272 million tonnes of ore grading 2.89% copper.

== See also ==
- List of mines in Russia
