= Severny mine =

Copper mine in Murmansk, Russia

- Interactive map of Severny mine
- Location: Murmansk Oblast, Russia
- Products: Copper

The Severny mine is a large copper mine located in the north-west of Russia in Murmansk Oblast. Severny represents one of the largest copper reserves in Russia and in the world, having estimated reserves of 511.2 million tonnes of ore grading 0.72% copper.

== See also ==
- List of mines in Russia
