= Molodezhny mine =

Copper mine in Bashkortostan, Russia

- Location: Bashkortostan, Russia
- Products: Copper

The Molodezhny mine is a large copper mine located in the southwest of Russia in Bashkortostan. Molodezhny represents one of the largest copper reserves in the world, estimated at 982.8 million tonnes of ore grading 1.65% copper.

== See also ==
- List of mines in Russia
