= Sukhoi Log mine =

Gold mine in Irkutsk Oblast, Russia

- Interactive map of Sukhoi Log mine
- Location: Irkutsk Oblast, Russia
- Products: Gold

The Sukhoi Log is one of the largest gold reserves in Russia and in the world The reserve is located in Irkutsk Oblast and has estimated reserves of 64 million oz of gold, but has a low grade.

== Mining endeavours ==
During the 1990s a proposal was made to mine Sukhoi Log by the semi-private Russian company Lenzoloto with the British Virgin Islands company Star Technology Systems (previously known as Green Applied Systems Limited). Funds toward the venture were raised from the Australian Stock Exchange company Star Mining (previously known as Central Mining Corporation, now Argonaut Resources). Various legal, bureaucratic and political problems delayed progress. Sukhoi Log was the subject of a special hearing held by the State Duma's Security Committee under the watchful gaze of hardline communist Viktor Ilyukhin to investigate threats to Russia's national security from this "shadowy" Australian company. The Australian company wrote off $127 million on the failed venture after Russian courts overturned decisions by Russian politicians.

== Formation of the gold deposit ==
The majority of gold was imputed during diagenesis and early metamorphism. After the majority of the gold input was finished, many large scale tectonic and geological events have occurred. Such event ages obtained by the monazite, Rb–Sr, and paleomagnetic studies. During these events the gold was likely remobilized and other ore minerals (e.g. pyrite) formed to create the present day state of Sukhoi Log. A summary of the known ages and events is given in Hnatishin and Kravchinsky (2014)

== See also ==
- List of mines in Russia
