= Ebelyakh River diamond mine =

Russian diamond mine

Ebelyakh River mine
- Location within Sakha Republic Location within Russia
- Location: Anabarsky District, Sakha Republic, Russia; 70°56′04″N 113°40′03″E
- Products: diamonds
- Discovered: 1965

The Ebelyakh River mine is one of the largest diamond mines in Russia and in the world. The mine is located in the north-eastern part of the country in the Sakha Republic. The mine has estimated reserves of 25.08 million carats of diamonds and an annual production capacity of 0.2 million carats.

== See also ==
- List of mines in Russia
