= Bakr-Tay mine =

Copper mine in Russia

Location
- Location: Bashkortostan, Russia

Production
- Products: Copper

The Bakr-Tay mine is a large copper mine located in the south-west of Russia in Bashkortostan. Bakr-Tay represents one of the largest copper reserve in Russia and in the world having estimated reserves of 114 million tonnes of ore grading 1.81% copper.

== See also ==
- List of mines in Russia
