= Urupsky mine =

Copper mine in Karachay-Cherkessia, Russia

- Location: Karachay-Cherkessia, Russia
- Products: Copper

The Urupsky mine is a large copper mine located in the south-west of Russia in Karachay-Cherkessia. Urupsky represents one of the largest copper reserve in Russia and in the world having estimated reserves of 365.7 million tonnes of ore grading 1.51% copper.

== See also ==
- List of mines in Russia
