= Etykinskoye mine =

Tantalum mine in Russia

- Location: Zabaykalsky Krai, Russia
- Products: Tantalum

The Etykinskoye mine is a large tantalum mine located in the southern part of Russia in Zabaykalsky Krai. Etykinskoye represents one of the largest tantalum reserves in Russia having estimated reserves of 97.7 million tonnes of ore grading 0.013% tantalum.

== See also ==
- List of mines in Russia
