= Oleniy Ruchey mine =

Phosphate mine in Perm Krai, Russia

- Location: Perm Krai, Russia
- Products: Phosphates

The Oleniy Ruchey mine is a large mine located in the Perm Krai. Oleniy Ruchey represents one of the largest phosphates reserve in Russia having estimated reserves of 403.5 million tonnes of ore grading 15.8% P_{2}O_{5}.

As of 2014, the developer of the mine is North-Western Phosphorus Company (NWPC), part of Acron Group.

== See also ==
- List of mines in Russia
