= Sakhalin coal mine =

Coal mine in Sakhalin, Russia

Sakhalin Coal Mine
- Location: Sakhalin Oblast, Russia
- Products: Coking coal

The Sakhalin Coal Mine is a coal mine located in Sakhalin Oblast, Russia. The mine has coal reserves amounting to 2 billion tonnes of coking coal, one of the largest coal reserves in Asia and the world. The mine has an annual production capacity of 3.5 million tonnes of coal.

== See also ==
- List of mines in Russia
