= Voznesenovskoye mine =

Tantalum mine in Primorsky Krai, Russia

- Location: Primorsky Krai, Russia
- Products: Tantalum

The Voznesenovskoye mine is a large mine located in the southern part of Russia in Primorsky Krai in the Khorolsky District. Voznesenovskoye represents one of the largest tantalum reserves in Russia having estimated reserves of 17.2 million tonnes of ore grading 0.012% tantalum.

== See also ==
- List of mines in Russia
