= Yermakovsky mine =

Beryllium mine in Kizhinginsky District, Buryatia, Russia

- Location: Kizhinginsky District, Buryatia, Russia
- Products: Beryllium

The Yermakovsky mine is one of the largest beryllium mines in Russia. The mine is located in Buryatia. The mine has reserves amounting to 1.4 million tonnes of ore grading 1% beryllium.

It is the only beryllium deposit in Russia suitable for profitable development; it is characterised by favourable mining and hydrogeological conditions, the ease of ore beneficiation and concentrate processing, as well as its location in an easily accessible area.

== See also ==
- List of mines in Russia
