= Maslovskoye mine =

Nickel mine in Krasnoyarsk Krai, Russia

- Location: Krasnoyarsk Krai, Russia
- Products: Nickel

The Maslovskoye mine is a large mine in the center of Russia in the Krasnoyarsk Krai. Maslovskoye represents one of the largest nickel reserve in Russia having estimated reserves of 215 million tonnes of ore grading 0.33% nickel, 12.5 million oz of platinum, 35.5 million oz of palladium and 1.3 million oz of gold. The 215 million tonnes of ore contains 0.73 million tonnes of nickel metal.

== See also ==
- List of mines in Russia
