= Taymyrsky mine =

Copper mine in Krasnoyarsk Krai, Russia

- Location: Krasnoyarsk Krai, Russia
- Products: Copper

The Taymyrsky mine is a large copper mine in the center of Russia in Krasnoyarsk Krai. Taymyrsky represents one of the largest copper reserves in the world, having estimated reserves of 1.68 billion tonnes (1.65 billion long tons; 1.85 billion short tons) of ore grading 3.49% copper.

== See also ==
- List of mines in Russia
