= Selemdzha mine =

Phosphate mine in Amur, Russia

- Location: Amur Oblast, Russia
- Products: Phosphates

The Selemdzha mine is a large mine located in the Amur Oblast. Selemdzha represents one of the largest phosphates reserve in Russia having estimated reserves of 500 million tonnes of ore grading 35% P_{2}O_{5}.

== See also ==
- List of mines in Russia
