= Usinsky coal mine =

Coal mine in Komi Republic, Russia

Usinsky Coal Mine
- Location: Komi Republic, Russia
- Products: Coking coal

The Usinsky Coal Mine is a coal mine located in north-western Russia in Komi Republic. The mine has coal reserves amounting to 620 million tonnes of coking coal, one of the largest coal reserves in Asia and the world. The mine has an annual production capacity of 5 million tonnes of coal.

== See also ==
- List of mines in Russia
