= Turyinsky mine =

Copper mine in Orenburg, Russia

- Location: Orenburg Oblast, Russia
- Products: Copper

The Turyinsky mine is a large copper mine located in the south-west of Russia in Orenburg Oblast. Turyinsky represents one of the largest copper reserve in Russia and in the world having estimated reserves of 151.3 million tonnes of ore grading 1.2% copper.

== See also ==
- List of mines in Russia
