= Kholzunskoye mine =

Iron ore mine in Altai, Russia

- Location: Altai Republic, Russia
- Products: Iron ore

The Kholzunskoye mine is a large iron mine located in southern Russia in the Altai Republic. Kholzunskoye represents one of the largest iron ore reserves in Russia and in the world having estimated reserves of 680 million tonnes of ore grading 30% iron metal.

== See also ==
- List of mines in Russia
