= Tugnui coal mine =

Coal mine in Buryatia, Russia

Tugnui Coal Mine
- Location: Buryatia, Russia
- Products: Coking coal

The Tugnui Coal Mine is a coal mine located in Buryatia, Russia. The mine has coal reserves amounting to 301 million tonnes of coking coal, one of the largest coal reserves in Russia and the world, and has an annual production of 5.8 million tonnes of coal.

In the 1930s, coal deposits were first found in the Tungui Valley, and in 1981, the coal mine was officially approved for building, but didn't start construction until 1984, when the town of Sagan-Nur was constructed. The first coal was extracted from the so-called Olon-Shibir deposit in 1989, and in 2001, the mine was acquired by the Siberian Coal Energy Company (SUEK,) which set out to modernize the operations. Since the acquisition by SUEK, an expansion to the Nikolsky deposit was started in 2015, in addition to the Olon-Shibir deposit. A coal processing plant is also located in the northern part of the mine, which was opened in 2009 with a capacity of 10.3 million tons a year. In addition, single-operator training driving was introduced in 2023 with 18 locomotives used, with Bucyrus excavators and BelAZ trucks used to transport the coal.

In March 2024, the coal mine hit a quarter of a billion tons of coal mined. It is one of the top three coal mining enterprises in Buryatia under the company name АО «Разрез Тугнуйский», and is the largest coal mining enterprise in Buryatia. A decade prior, in 2014, the mine was named the best coal mining enterprise in Russia.

The coal is exported to the Asia-Pacific region and is also used in Russian power plants.

== See also ==
- List of mines in Russia
