= Prognoz mine =

Silver mine in Sakha, Russia

- Location: Sakha Republic, Russia
- Products: Silver

The Prognoz mine is one of the largest silver mines in Russia and in the world. The mine is located in Sakha Republic. The mine has estimated reserves of 205 million oz of silver.

== See also ==
- List of mines in Russia
