= Chulmakansky coal mine =

Coal mine in Russia

Chulmakansky Coal Mine
Location
- Location: Russia

Production
- Products: Coking coal

The Chulmakansky Coal Mine is a coal mine located in eastern Russia. The mine has coal reserves amounting to 199 million tonnes of coking coal, one of the largest coal reserves in Asia and the world. The mine has an annual production capacity of 0.6 million tonnes of coal.

== See also ==
- List of mines in Russia
