= Gora Rudnaya mine =

Gold mine in Sakha, Russia

- Location: Sakha Republic, Russia
- Products: Magnetite

The Gora Rudnaya mine is a chromite mine is located north of Iltmsk, in the Aldansky District of the Sakha Republic. The mine is Russia's most important chromite ore extraction site. The magnetite vein is 5 kilometers long, with a maximum thickness of 120 meters.

In 2013, 200 metric tons of gold were presumably discovered at the Gora Rudnaya site.

== See also ==
- List of mines in Russia
