= Khangalassky coal mine =

Coal mine in Sakha, Russia

Khangalassky Coal Mine
- Location: Sakha Republic, Russia
- Products: Coking coal

The Khangalassky Coal Mine is a coal mine located in Sakha Republic. The mine has coal reserves amounting to 3.45 billion tonnes of coking coal, one of the largest coal reserves in Asia and the world. The mine has an annual production capacity of 8 million tonnes of coal.

== See also ==
- List of mines in Russia
