= Neryungrinsky coal mine =

Coal mine in Russia

Coordinates: 56.7106°N 124.5928°E

Neryungrinsky Coal Mine
- Interactive map of Neryungrinsky Coal Mine
- Location: Russia
- Products: Coking coal

The Neryungrinsky Coal Mine is a coal mine located in eastern Russia. The mine has coal reserves amounting to 197 million tonnes of coking coal, one of the largest coal reserves in Asia and the world. The mine has an annual production capacity of 10 million tonnes of coal.

== See also ==
- List of mines in Russia
