= Mayak mine =

Copper mine in Krasnoyarsk Krai, Russia

Coordinates: 69.4833°N 88.4333°E

- Interactive map of Mayak mine
- Location: Krasnoyarsk Krai, Russia
- Products: Copper

The Mayak mine is a large copper mine located in the center of Russia in Krasnoyarsk Krai. Mayak represents one of the largest copper reserve in Russia and in the world having estimated reserves of 456.7 million tonnes of ore grading 2.05% copper.

== See also ==
- List of mines in Russia
