= Orlovskoye mine =

Tantalum mine in Zabaykalsky Krai, Russia

- Location: Zabaykalsky Krai, Russia
- Products: Tantalum

The Orlovskoye mine is a large mine located in the southern part of Russia in Zabaykalsky Krai. Orlovskoye represents one of the largest tantalum reserves in Russia having estimated reserves of 200 million tonnes of ore grading 0.015% tantalum.

== See also ==
- List of mines in Russia
