= Western Zhdanovskoye mine =

Copper mine in Murmansk, Russia

- Interactive map of Western Zhdanovskoye mine
- Location: Murmansk Oblast, Russia
- Products: Copper

The Western Zhdanovskoye mine is a large copper mine located in the north-west of Russia in Murmansk Oblast. Western Zhdanovskoye represents one of the largest copper reserves in Russia and in the world having estimated reserves of 1.4 billion tonnes of ore grading 0.3% copper.

== See also ==
- List of mines in Russia
