= Katuginskoy mine =

Tantalum mine in Russia

- Location: Zabaykalsky Krai, Russia
- Products: Tantalum

The Katuginskoy mine is a large mine located in the southern part of Russia in Zabaykalsky Krai. Katuginskoy represents one of the largest tantalum reserves in Russia having estimated reserves of 774 million tonnes of ore grading 0.025% tantalum.

== See also ==
- List of mines in Russia
