= Kotselvaara mine =

Copper mine in Murmansk, Russia

- Interactive map of Kotselvaara mine
- Location: Murmansk Oblast, Russia
- Products: Copper

The Kotselvaara mine is a large copper mine located in the north-west of Russia in Murmansk Oblast. Kotselvaara represents one of the largest copper reserve in Russia and in the world having estimated reserves of 996.4 million tonnes of ore grading 0.46% copper.

== See also ==
- List of mines in Russia
