= Kharlovskoye mine =

Iron ore mine in Sakha, Russia

- Location: Sakha Republic, Russia
- Products: Iron ore

The Kharlovskoye mine is a large iron mine located in eastern Russia in the Sakha Republic. Kharlovskoye represents one of the largest iron ore reserves in Russia and in the world having estimated reserves of 4 billion tonnes of ore grading 15.3% iron metal.

== See also ==
- List of mines in Russia
