= Sorsky mine =

Copper mine in Krasnoyarsk Krai, Russia

- Location: Krasnoyarsk Krai, Russia
- Products: Copper

The Sorsky mine is a large copper mine located in the center of Russia in Krasnoyarsk Krai. Sorsky represents one of the largest copper reserves in Russia and in the world, having estimated reserves of 9.43 billion tonnes of ore grading 0.046% copper.

== See also ==
- List of mines in Russia
