= Oktyabrskoye mine =

Copper mine in Krasnoyarsk Krai, Russia

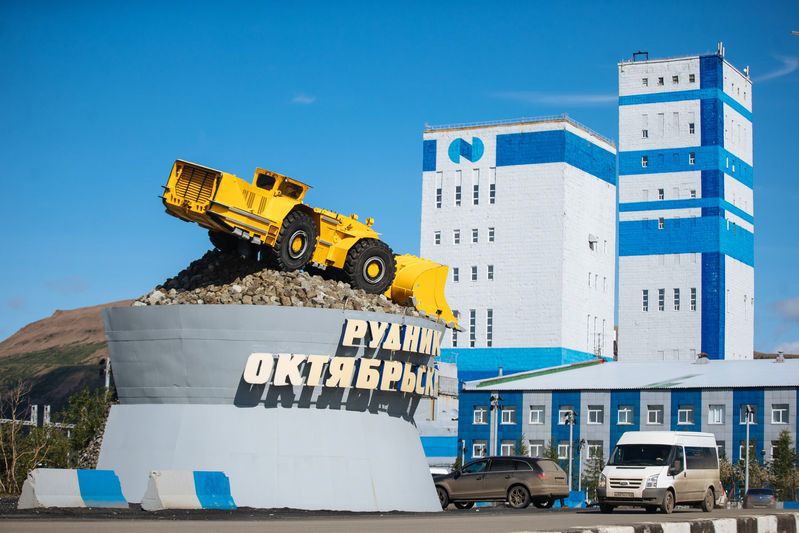
- Interactive map of Oktyabrskoye mine
- Location: Krasnoyarsk Krai, Russia
- Products: Copper

The Oktyabrskoye mine is a large copper mine located in the center of Russia in Krasnoyarsk Krai. Oktyabrskoye represents one of the largest copper reserve in Russia and in the world having estimated reserves of 3.23 billion tonnes of ore grading 7.74% copper.

== See also ==
- List of mines in Russia
