= Urgal coal mine =

Coal mine in Khabarovsk Krai, Russia

Urgal Coal Mine
- Location: Khabarovsk Krai, Russia
- Products: Coking coal
- Company: SUEK
- Website: http://www.suek.com/our-business/operations/?region=khabarovskiy_kray

The Urgal Coal Mine is a conglomeration of three coal mines (Bureinsky open-pit, Pravoberezhny open-pit and Severnaya underground mine) located in Khabarovsk Krai in Russia. The three mines at the end of 2019 had coal reserves amounting to 222 million tonnes of coking coal and had an annual production of 6.2 million tonnes of coal in 2019.

== See also ==
- List of mines in Russia
