= Vostok mine =

Copper mine in Krasnoyarsk Krai, Russia

- Location: Krasnoyarsk Krai, Russia
- Products: Copper

The Vostok mine is a large copper mine located in the center of Russia in Krasnoyarsk Krai. Vostok represents one of the largest copper reserve in Russia and in the world having estimated reserves of 115.2 million tonnes of ore grading 0.88% copper.

== See also ==
- List of mines in Russia
