= Kuznetsky Alatau mine =

Iron ore mine in Kemerovo, Russia

- Location: Kemerovo Oblast, Russia
- Products: Iron ore

The Kuznetsky Alatau mine is a large iron mine located in central-southern Russia in the Kemerovo Oblast. Kuznetsky Alatau represents one of the largest iron ore reserves in Russia and in the world having estimated reserves of 3 billion tonnes of ore grading 48% iron metal.

== See also ==
- List of mines in Russia
