= Gaysky mine =

Copper mine in Russia

- Location: Orenburg Oblast, Russia
- Products: Copper

The Gaysky mine is a large copper mine located in the south-west of Russia in Orenburg Oblast. Gaysky represents one of the largest copper reserve in Russia and in the world having estimated reserves of 3.06 billion tonnes of ore grading 1.7% copper.

== See also ==
- List of mines in Russia
