= Lavrovo-Nikolaevsky mine =

Copper mine in Orenburg, Russia

- Location: Orenburg Oblast, Russia
- Products: Copper

The Lavrovo-Nikolaevsky mine is a large copper mine located in the south-west of Russia in Orenburg Oblast. Lavrovo-Nikolaevsky represents one of the largest copper reserve in Russia and in the world having estimated reserves of 813.5 million tonnes of ore grading 0.8% copper.

== See also ==
- List of mines in Russia
