= Aganozersky mine =

Nickel mine in Russia

- Location: Republic of Karelia, Russia
- Products: Nickel

The Aganozersky mine is a large mine in the north of Russia in the Republic of Karelia. Aganozersky represents one of the largest nickel reserve in Russia having estimated reserves of 405 million tonnes of ore grading 0.15% nickel, 2.33 million oz of platinum, 1.66 million oz of palladium and 0.43 million oz of gold. The 405 million tonnes of ore contains 0.6 million tonnes of nickel metal. The mine contains a large chromium reserve as well, having estimated reserves of 181.6 million tonnes of ore grading 21.8% chromium. The 181.6 million tonnes of ore contains 38.7 million tonnes of chromium metal.

== See also ==
- List of mines in Russia
