= Elkon mine =

Uranium mine in Sakha Republic, Russia

Coordinates: 58.5667°N 126.2500°E

- Interactive map of Elkon mine
- Location: Sakha Republic, Russia
- Products: uranium

The Elkon mine is a large open pit mine in the eastern part of Russia in Sakha Republic. Elkon represents one of the largest uranium reserves in Russia having estimated reserves of 219.2 million tonnes of ore grading 0.15% uranium.

== See also ==
- List of mines in Russia
