= Padma mine =

Vanadium mine in Karelia, Russia

- Location: Republic of Karelia, Russia
- Products: Vanadium

The Padma mine is one of the largest vanadium mines in Russia. The mine is located in Republic of Karelia. The mine has reserves amounting to 4.6 million tonnes of ore grading 2.35% vanadium.

== See also ==
- List of mines in Russia
