= Vishnyakovskoe mine =

Lithium mine in Irkutsk, Russia

- Location: Irkutsk Oblast, Russia
- Products: Lithium

The Vishnyakovskoe mine is one of the largest lithium mines in Russia. The mine is located in southern Russia in Irkutsk Oblast. The Vishnyakovskoe mine has reserves amounting to 42 million tonnes of lithium ore grading 0.49% lithium thus resulting 0.2 million tonnes of lithium.

== See also ==
- List of mines in Russia
