= Uchalinsky mine =

Copper mine in Bashkortostan, Russia

- Location within Russia
- Location: Bashkortostan, Russia; 57°7′55″N 59°23′31″E
- Products: Copper

The Uchalinsky mine is a large copper mine located in Russia about 75 km northwest of Yekaterinburg, in Sverdlovsk Oblast. Uchalinsky represents one of the largest copper reserve in Russia and in the world having estimated reserves of 1.94 billion tonnes of ore grading 1.05% copper.

== See also ==
- List of mines in Russia
