= Alakhinskoye mine =

Mine in Russia

Location
- Location: Altai Republic, Russia

Production
- Products: Lithium

The Alakhinskoye mine is one of the largest lithium mines located in Russia. The mine is located in southern Russia in Altai Republic. The Alakhinskoye mine has reserves estimated at 218 million tonnes of lithium ore grading 0.8% lithium thus resulting 1.74 million tonnes of lithium.

== See also ==
- List of mines in Russia
