= Mikhaylovskiy mine =

- Location: Kursk Oblast, Russia
- Products: Iron ore

The Mikhaylovskiy mine is a large iron mine located in western Russia in the Kursk Oblast. Mikhaylovskiy represents one of the largest iron ore reserves in Russia and in the world having estimated reserves of 10.7 billion tonnes of ore grading 35% iron metal.

== See also ==
- List of mines in Russia
