= Degtyarsky mine =

Copper mine in Russia

Location
- Location: Sverdlovsk Oblast, Russia

Production
- Products: Copper

The Degtyarsky mine is a large copper mine located in the south-west of Russia in Sverdlovsk Oblast. Degtyarsky represents one of the largest copper reserve in Russia and in the world having estimated reserves of 224 million tonnes of ore grading 1.48% copper.

== See also ==
- List of mines in Russia
