= Yugo-Vostochnaya Gremyakha mine =

Titanium mine in Murmansk, Russia

- Location: Murmansk Oblast, Russia
- Products: Titanium

The Yugo-Vostochnaya Gremyakha mine is one of the largest titanium mines in Russia. Located in Murmansk Oblast, it has reserves amounting to 585.3 million tonnes of ore grading 8.51% titanium.

== See also ==
- List of mines in Russia
