= Uzelginskaya mine =

Copper mine in Bashkortostan, Russia

- Location: Bashkortostan, Russia
- Products: Copper

The Uzelginskaya mine is a large copper mine located in the south-west of Russia in Bashkortostan. Uzelginskaya represents one of the largest copper reserves in Russia and in the world having estimated reserves of 133 kilotonnes of ore grading 1.27% copper.

== See also ==
- List of mines in Russia
