= Talnakhite =

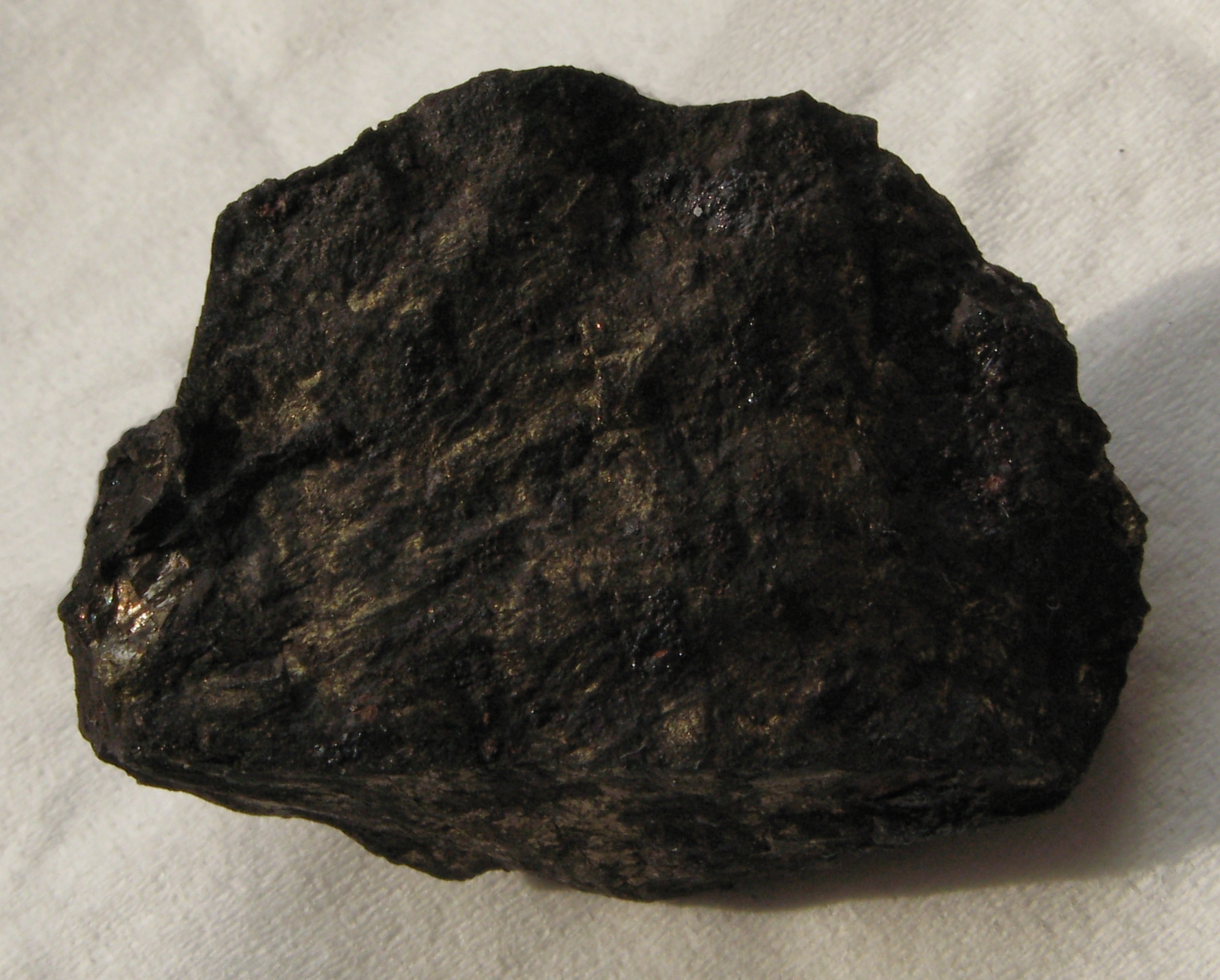
- Talnakhite and putoranite

General
- Category: Sulfide mineral
- Formula: Cu_{9}(Fe, Ni)_{8}S_{16}
- IMA symbol: Tlk
- Strunz classification: 2.CB.10b
- Crystal system: Isometric
- Crystal class: Hextetrahedral (4̅3m); H-M symbol: (4̅ 3m)
- Space group: I4̅ 3m

Identification
- Color: Brass-yellow, tarnishes to pink or brown tints, then iridescent
- Luster: Metallic
- Diaphaneity: Opaque

Talnakhite is a mineral of chalcopyrite group with formula: Cu_{9}(Fe, Ni)_{8}S_{16}. It was named after the Talnakh ore deposit, near Norilsk in Western Siberia, Russia where it was discovered as reported in 1963 by I. Budko and E. Kulagov. It was officially named "talnakhite" in 1968. Despite the initial announcement it turned out to be not a face centered high-temperature polymorph of chalcopyrite, but to have composition Cu_{18}(Fe, Ni)_{18}S_{32}. At 80 °C (176 °F) to 100 °C (212 °F) it decomposes to tetragonal cubanite plus bornite.
