= Tash-Tau mine =

Copper mine in Bashkortostan, Russia

- Location: Bashkortostan, Russia
- Products: Copper

The Tash-Tau mine is a large copper mine located in the south-west of Russia in Bashkortostan. Tash-Tau represents one of the largest copper reserves in Russia and in the world, having estimated reserves of 111.7 million tonnes of ore grading 8.63% copper.

== See also ==
- List of mines in Russia
