= Pereyaslavskoye coal mine =

Coal mine in Krasnoyarsk Krai, Russia

Pereyaslavskoye Coal Mine
- Location: Krasnoyarsk Krai, Russia
- Products: Coking coal

The Pereyaslavskoye Coal Mine is a coal mine located in Krasnoyarsk Krai, in southern Russia. The mine has coal reserves amounting to 900 million tonnes of coking coal, one of the largest coal reserves in Asia and the world. The mine has an annual production capacity of 4 million tonnes of coal.

== See also ==
- List of mines in Russia
