= Zhernovskoye coal mine =

Coal mine in Kemerovo, Russia

Zhernovskoye Coal Mine
- Location: Kemerovo Oblast, Russia
- Products: Coking coal

The Zhernovskoye Coal Mine is a coal mine located in southern Russia in Kemerovo Oblast. The mine has coal reserves amounting to 163 million tonnes of coking coal, one of the largest coal reserves in Asia and the world. The mine has an annual production capacity of 3.6 million tonnes of coal.

== See also ==
- List of mines in Russia
