= Talitsky mine =

Potash mine in Perm Krai, Russia

- Location: Perm Krai, Russia
- Products: Potash

The Talitsky mine is a large mine located in the Perm Krai. Talitsky represents one of the largest potash reserves in Russia having estimated reserves of 1.62 billion tonnes of ore grading 19.2% potassium chloride.

== See also ==
- List of mines in Russia
