= Blyavinsky mine =

Copper mine in Bashkortostan, Russia

Location
- Location: Bashkortostan, Russia

Production
- Products: Copper

The Blyavinsky mine is a large copper mine located in the south-west of Russia in Bashkortostan. Blyavinsky represents one of the largest copper reserve in Russia and in the world having estimated reserves of 139.3 thousand tonnes of ore grading 2.5% copper.

== See also ==
- List of mines in Russia
