= Verkhnekingashskoye mine =

Nickel mine in Norilsk, Krasnoyarsk Krai, Russia

- Location: Norilsk, Krasnoyarsk Krai, Russia
- Products: Nickel
- Company: Norilsk Nickel

The Verkhnekingashskoye mine is a large mine in the north of Russia near Norilsk in the Krasnoyarsk Krai. Verkhnekingashskoye represents one of the largest nickel reserve in Russia having estimated reserves of 484.6 million tonnes of ore grading 0.44% nickel. The 484.6 million tonnes of ore contains 2.16 million tonnes of nickel metal.

== See also ==
- List of mines in Russia
