= Taryno-Kurdatsky mine =

Silver mine in Sakha Republic, Russia

- Location: Sakha Republic, Russia
- Products: Silver

The Taryno-Kurdatsky mine is one of the largest silver mines in Russia and in the world. The mine is located in Sakha Republic. The mine has estimated reserves of 320 million ounces of silver.

== See also ==
- List of mines in Russia
