= Gusevogorskoye mine =

Iron ore mine in Sverdlovsk, Russia

- Location: Sverdlovsk Oblast, Russia
- Products: Iron ore, Vanadium, Titanium
- Acquired: 2004

The Gusevogorskoye mine is a large iron mine located in central-western Russia in the Sverdlovsk Oblast. Gusevogorskoye represents one of the largest iron ore reserves in Russia and in the world having estimated reserves of 2 billion tonnes of ore grading 15.8% iron metal.

== See also ==
- List of mines in Russia
