= Korpanga mine =

Iron ore mine in Karelia, Russia

- Location: Republic of Karelia, Russia
- Products: Iron ore

The Korpanga mine is a large iron mine located in north-western Russia in the Republic of Karelia. Korpanga represents one of the largest iron ore reserves in Russia and in the world, having estimated reserves of 527 million tonnes of ore grading 30% iron metal.

== See also ==
- List of mines in Russia
