= Tsentralnyi coal mine =

Coal mine in Russia

Tsentralnyi Coal Mine
- Location: Tuva, Russia
- Products: Coking coal

The Tsentralnyi Coal Mine is a coal mine located in Tuva, Russia. The mine has coal reserves amounting to 639 million tonnes of coking coal, one of the largest coal reserves in Russia and the world. It was acquired by Russian steel company Severstal in 2010 and has an annual production of 1 million tonnes of coal.

== See also ==
- List of mines in Russia
