= Voznesenka, Duvansky District, Republic of Bashkortostan =

Voznesenka Вознесенка
- Selo
- Location within Bashkortostan Location within Russia
- Coordinates: 55°47′N 57°55′E
- Country: Russia
- Region: Bashkortostan
- District: Duvansky District
- Time zone: UTC+5:00

Voznesenka (Russian: Вознесенка) is a rural locality (a selo) and the administrative centre of Voznesensky Selsoviet, Duvansky District, Bashkortostan, Russia. The population was 1,217 as of 2010. There are 5 streets.

== Geography ==
Voznesenka is located 42 km northwest of Mesyagutovo (the district's administrative centre) by road. Tastuba is the nearest rural locality.
