= Lednikovy-Sarmaka mine =

Tungsten mine in Russia

- Location: Siberia, Russia
- Products: Tungsten

The Lednikovy-Sarmaka mine is a large open pit mine located in the eastern part of Russia in Siberia. Lednikovy-Sarmaka represents one of the largest tungsten reserves in Russia having estimated reserves of 11 million tonnes of ore grading 0.37% tungsten.
