= Kyzyl-Tash Turk mine =

Lead and zinc mine in Tuva, Russia

- Location: Tuva, Russia
- Products: Lead, Zinc

The Kyzyl-Tash Turk mine is one of the largest lead and zinc mines in Russia. The mine is located in the Tyva Republic, and has 12.9 million metric tons of ore grading 1.55% lead and 10% zinc, or 0.2 million metric tons of pure lead and 1.29 million metric tons of pure zinc. The mine also has reserves amounting to 482,000 oz of gold and 21.7 million oz of silver. The mine is owned by China’s Zijin Mining Group and as of 2025 it's facing shutdown due to issues related to financial operations caused by international sanctions.

== See also ==
- List of mines in Russia
