= Pudozhsky mine =

Titanium mine in Karelia, Russia

- Location: Republic of Karelia, Russia
- Products: Titanium

The Pudozhsky mine is one of the largest titanium mines in Russia. The mine is located in Republic of Karelia. The mine has reserves amounting to 516.7 million tonnes of ore grading 8.1% titanium, 1 million oz of platinum and 2.4 million oz of gold.

== See also ==
- List of mines in Russia
