= Voznesenka, Iglinsky District, Republic of Bashkortostan =

Voznesenka Вознесенка
- Village
- Location within Bashkortostan Location within Russia
- Coordinates: 54°44′N 56°44′E
- Country: Russia
- Region: Bashkortostan
- District: Iglinsky District
- Time zone: UTC+5:00

Voznesenka (Russian: Вознесенка) is a rural locality (a village) in Austrumsky Selsoviet, Iglinsky District, Bashkortostan, Russia. The population was 4 as of 2010. There is 1 street.

== Geography ==
Voznesenka is located 41 km southeast of Iglino (the district's administrative centre) by road. Simskoye is the nearest rural locality.
