= Master Ulug =

Tang dynasty manichaean missionary

Master Ulug (Middle Persian：xrwhxw’n / xrōhxwān; Uyghur: Qutluɣ) was a Uyghur Manichaean missionary in the Tang Dynasty

== Life ==
When Wu Zong persecuted Buddhists, Manichaeism all over the country was hit hard. To escape persecution, Master Hulu entered Fujian and carried out missionary activities there, becoming the founder of Fujian Manichaeism-Mingjiao. He preached mainly in Fuqing, Fuzhou, and Quanzhou during his lifetime, and was later buried in Qingyuan Mountain, Quanzhou. Zhu Xi went to his tomb to pay a visit. Today there is still Mingjiao Caoan in Quanzhou, which is the remains of the Fujianese Manichaeism created by Master Ulug.

== Identity ==
Some scholars believe that the name of Master Ulug in Medieval Persian is synonymous with the "Hu Luhuan" mentioned in "Yilue", and ranks fourth among the five-level Manichaeism, meaning "missionary." Then it was judged that Master Hulu came from the Eastern Pure Church in Central Asia There are also scholars who believe that the status of "missionaries" is not consistent with that of Master Hulu, whose names are Qutluɣ (auspicious) or Uluɣ (big) in Uyghur language，and should be regarded as a Manichaean monk directly from Uighurs
