= Shalozersky chromium mine =

Chromium mine in Karelia, Russia

Shalozersky mine
- Location: Republic of Karelia, Russia
- Products: Chromium

The Shalozersky mine is a large mine in the north-west of Russia in Republic of Karelia. Shalozersky represents one of the largest chromium reserve in Russia having estimated reserves of 206.1 million tonnes of ore grading 15.4% chromium. The 206.1 million tonnes of ore contains 31.7 million tonnes of chromium metal.
