= Gornoye Ozero mine =

Niobium mine in Sakha Republic, Russia

- Location: Sakha Republic, Russia
- Products: Niobium

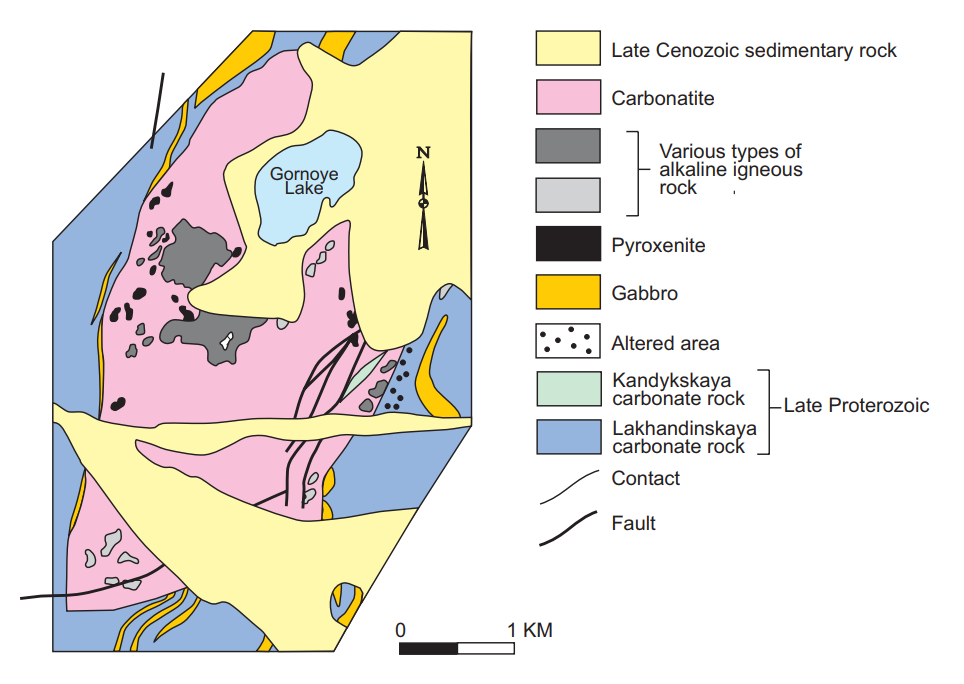
Gornoye Ozero geological map

The Gornoye Ozero mine is a large niobium mine located in eastern Russia in Sakha Republic. Gornoye Ozero represents one of the largest niobium reserves in Russia having estimated reserves of 24 million tonnes of ore grading 0.36% niobium.
