= Liublinskaya mine =

Bentonite mine in Novosibirsk, Russia

- Location: Novosibirsk Oblast, Russia
- Products: Bentonite

The Liublinskaya mine is a large mine located in the south of Russia in Novosibirsk Oblast. Liublinskaya represents the largest bentonite reserve in Russia having estimated reserves of 20.4 million tonnes.
