= Kyzyl-Tash, Republic of Bashkortostan =

Kyzyl-Tash Кызыл-Таш
- Village
- Location within Bashkortostan Location within Russia
- Coordinates: 54°32′N 53°52′E
- Country: Russia
- Region: Bashkortostan
- District: Tuymazinsky District
- Time zone: UTC+5:00

Kyzyl-Tash (Russian: Кызыл-Таш; Bashkir: Ҡызылташ, Qıźıltaş) is a rural locality (a village) in Gafurovsky Selsoviet, Tuymazinsky District, Bashkortostan, Russia. The population was 26 as of 2010. There is 1 street.

== Geography ==
Kyzyl-Tash is located 17 km southeast of Tuymazy (the district's administrative centre) by road. Vozdvizhenka is the nearest rural locality.
