= Preobrazhenovskoye mine =

Fluorite mine in Russia

- Location: Primorsky Krai, Russia
- Products: Fluorite

The Preobrazhenovskoye mine is a large mine located in the south-eastern Russia in Primorsky Krai. Preobrazhenovskoye represents one of the largest fluorite reserves in Russia having estimated reserves of 14.9 million tonnes of ore grading 6.22% fluorite.
