= Olovskoye mine =

Uranium mine in Russia

- Location: Zabaykalsky Krai, Russia
- Products: uranium

The Olovskoye mine is a large open pit mine located in the southern part of Russia in Zabaykalsky Krai. Olovskoye represents one of the largest uranium reserves in Russia having estimated reserves of 16.8 million tonnes of ore grading 0.082% uranium.
