= Urzarsaiskoye mine =

Tungsten mine in Russia

- Location: Siberia, Russia
- Products: Tungsten

The Urzarsaiskoye mine is a large open pit mine located in the eastern part of Russia in Siberia. Urzarsaiskoye represents one of the largest tungsten reserves in Russia having estimated reserves of 90.9 million tonnes of ore grading 0.11% tungsten.
