= Zhireken mine =

Molybdenum mine in Russia

- Location: Zhireken, Zabaykalsky Krai, Russia
- Products: Molybdenum

The Zhireken mine is one of the largest molybdenum mines in Russia. The mine is located near Zhireken in south-west Russia in Zabaykalsky Krai. The Zhireken mine has reserves amounting to 57.3 million tonnes of molybdenum ore grading 0.05% molybdenum thus resulting 28,700 tonnes of molybdenum.

== See also ==
- List of molybdenum mines
