= Lunnoye mine =

Silver mine in Russia

- Location: Siberia, Russia
- Products: Silver

The Lunnoye mine is one of the largest silver mines in Russia and in the world. The mine is located in Siberia. The mine has estimated reserves of 55 million oz of silver.
