= Aktashskoye mine =

Mercury mine in Russia

- Location: Siberia, Russia
- Products: Mercury

The Aktashskoye mine is one of the largest mercury mines in Russia and in the world. The mine is located in Siberia. The mine has estimated reserves of 1.38 million tonnes of ore grading 0.4% mercury.
