= Shalozersky mine =

Nickel mine in Russia

- Location: Republic of Karelia, Russia
- Products: Nickel

The Shalozersky mine is a large mine in the north of Russia in the Republic of Karelia. Shalozersky represents one of the largest nickel reserve in Russia having estimated reserves of 306.1 million tonnes of ore grading 0.14% nickel, 4.56 million oz of platinum, 3.91 million oz of palladium and 0.85 million oz of gold. The 306.1 million tonnes of ore contains 0.43 million tonnes of nickel metal.
