= Egitinskoye mine =

Fluorite mine in Russia

- Location: Primorsky Krai, Russia
- Products: Fluorite

The Egitinskoye mine is a large mine located in the south-eastern Russia in Primorsky Krai. Egitinskoye represents one of the largest fluorite reserves in Russia having estimated reserves of 4.2 million tonnes of ore grading 53.2% fluorite.
