= Ruchar mine =

Titanium mine in Russia

- Location: Far Eastern Federal District, Russia
- Products: Titanium

The Ruchar mine is one of the largest titanium mines in Russia. The mine is located in the Far Eastern Federal District. The mine has reserves amounting to 3 billion tonnes of ore grading 15% titanium.
