= Kun-Manie mine =

Nickel mine in Russia

- Location within Russia
- Location: Amur Oblast, Russia; 55°22′0.01″N 132°27′0″E
- Products: Nickel

The Kun-Manie mine is a large mine prospect in the Far East of Russia in the Amur Oblast. Kun-Manie represents one of the largest nickel reserves in the world, having current estimated reserves of over 1 million Nickel Equivalent tonnes of metals and likely to be closer to 2 million once full exploration is completed. It is among the largest 10 nickel discoveries in the world, and is still having its limits defined through further infill drilling. The amount of nickel and other metals will be very substantially more.

On 22 May 2015 the Russian Prime Minister issued final approval for the extraction of the contained metals, giving Amur Mineral 100% of the value of all extracted metals, subject to normal tax arrangements.

Kun Manie is also subject to an MOU with major Chinese producer Jinchuan who are currently undertaking due diligence on Amur Minerals with a view to help with its development.
