= Selgdarsky mine =

Phosphate mine in Russia

- Location: Sakha Republic, Russia
- Products: Phosphates

The Selgdarsky mine is a large mine located in the Sakha Republic. Selgdarsky represents one of the largest phosphates reserve in Russia having estimated reserves of 3 billion tonnes of ore grading 35.5% P_{2}O_{5}.
