= Dalmatovkoye mine =

Uranium mine in Russia

Dalmatovskoye mine
- Location: Kurgan Oblast, Russia
- Products: uranium

The Dalmatovskoye mine is a large open pit mine located in the southern part of Russia in Kurgan Oblast. Dalmatovskoye represents one of the largest uranium reserves in Russia having estimated reserves of 25.5 million tonnes of ore grading 0.04% uranium.
