= Agaskyrskoe mine =

Molybdenum mine in Russia

- Location: Khakassia, Russia
- Products: Molybdenum

The Agaskyrskoe mine is a large molybdenum mine located in the south of Russia in Khakassia. Agaskyrskoe represents one of the largest molybdenum reserve in Russia and in the world having estimated reserves of 310.5 million tonnes of ore grading 0.16% molybdenum, 0.032% copper and 16.3 million oz of silver.
