= Pioneer mine =

Gold mine in Amur, Russia

- Location: Amur Oblast, Russia
- Products: Gold

The Pioneer mine is one of the largest gold mines in Russia and in the world. The mine is located in Amur Oblast. The mine has estimated reserves of 6.7 million oz of gold.
