= Tomtor mine =

Mine in Sakha Republic, Russia

- Location: Sakha Republic, Russia
- Products: Phosphates

The Tomtor mine is a large mine located in the Sakha Republic (Yakutia). Tomtor represents one of the largest phosphates reserve in Russia having estimated reserves of 500 million tonnes of ore grading 35% P_{2}O_{5}.

Tomtor contains one of the world's largest concentration of rare earth minerals, estimated to be as high as 14.5%. As of 2025 the field remains undeveloped.
