= Komsomolsky mine =

Copper mine in Krasnoyarsk Krai, Russia

- Location: Krasnoyarsk Krai, Russia
- Products: Copper

The Komsomolsky mine is a large copper mine located in the center of Russia in Krasnoyarsk Krai. Komsomolsky represents one of the largest copper reserve in Russia and in the world having estimated reserves of 1.35 billion tonnes of ore grading 2.85% copper.

== See also ==
- List of mines in Russia
