= Lobash mine =

Molybdenum mine in Russia

- Location: Republic of Karelia, Russia
- Products: Molybdenum

The Lobash mine is one of the largest molybdenum mines in Russia. The mine is located in north-west Russia in Republic of Karelia. The Lobash mine has reserves amounting to 128.1 million tonnes of molybdenum ore grading 0.14% molybdenum thus resulting 132,000 tonnes of molybdenum.

== See also ==
- List of molybdenum mines
