= Safyanovskoe mine =

Mine in Russia

- Location: Novosibirsk Oblast, Russia
- Products: Lead, Zinc

The Safyanovskoe mine is one of the largest lead mines in Russia. The mine is located in southern Russia in Novosibirsk Oblast. The mine has reserves amounting to 19.2 million tonnes of ore grading 0.1% lead.
