= Listvianskaya coal mine =

Coal mine in Russia

Listvianskaya Coal Mine
- Location: Novosibirsk Oblast, Russia
- Products: Coking coal

The Listvianskaya Coal Mine is a coal mine located in Novosibirsk Oblast. The mine has coal reserves amounting to 895 million tonnes of coking coal, one of the largest coal reserves in Russia and the world and has an annual production of 5 million tonnes of coal.
