= Yaroslavsky mine =

Fluorite mine in Russia

- Location: Primorsky Krai, Russia
- Products: Fluorite

The Yaroslavsky mine is a large mine located in the south-eastern Russia in Primorsky Krai. Yaroslavsky represents one of the largest fluorite reserves in Russia having estimated reserves of 51.3 million tonnes of ore grading 30.9% fluorite.
