= Voznesenka, Birsky District, Republic of Bashkortostan =

Voznesenka Вознесенка
- Village
- Location within Bashkortostan Location within Russia
- Coordinates: 55°24′N 55°18′E
- Country: Russia
- Region: Bashkortostan
- District: Birsky District
- Time zone: UTC+5:00

Voznesenka (Russian: Вознесенка) is a rural locality (a village) in Kusekeyevsky Selsoviet, Birsky District, Bashkortostan, Russia. The population was 3 as of 2010. There are 2 streets.

== Geography ==
Voznesenka is located 23 km west of Birsk (the district's administrative centre) by road. Alexandrovka is the nearest rural locality.
