= Kirovgradsky mine =

Copper mine in Russia

- Location: Sverdlovsk Oblast, Russia
- Products: Copper

The Kirovgradsky mine is a large copper mine located in the south-west of Russia in Sverdlovsk Oblast. Kirovgradsky represents one of the largest copper reserve in Russia and in the world having estimated reserves of 200 million tonnes of ore grading 4.3% copper.
