= Gorlovsky coal mine =

Coal mine in Russia

Gorlovsky Coal Mine
- Location: Novosibirsk Oblast, Russia
- Products: Coking coal

The Gorlovsky Coal Mine is a coal mine located in Novosibirsk Oblast. The mine has coal reserves amounting to 5 billion tonnes of coking coal, one of the largest coal reserves in Russia and the world and has an annual production of 5 million tonnes of coal.
