= Bystrinskoye mine =

Gold mine in Russia

- Location: Zabaykalsky Krai, Russia
- Products: Gold

The Bystrinskoye mine is one of the largest gold mines in Russia and in the world. The mine is located in Zabaykalsky Krai. The mine has estimated reserves of 6.4 million oz of gold.
