= Kalanguyskoye mine =

Fluorite mine in Russia

- Location: Primorsky Krai, Russia
- Products: Fluorite

The Kalanguyskoye mine is a large mine located in the south-eastern Russia in Primorsky Krai. Kalanguyskoye represents one of the largest fluorite reserves in Russia having estimated reserves of 6.3 million tonnes of ore grading 60% fluorite.
