= Sorsk mine =

Molybdenum mine in Russia

- Location: Abakan, Khakassia, Russia
- Products: Molybdenum

The Sorsk mine is one of the largest molybdenum mines in Russia. The mine is located near Abakan in south Russia in Khakassia. The Sorsk mine has reserves amounting to 140.3 million tonnes of molybdenum ore grading 0.05% molybdenum thus resulting 70,000 tonnes of molybdenum.

== See also ==
- List of molybdenum mines
