= Albazino mine =

Gold mine in Khabarovsk Krai, Russia

- Location: Khabarovsk Krai, Russia
- Products: Gold

The Albazino mine is one of the largest gold mines in Russia and in the world. The mine is located in Khabarovsk Krai. The mine has estimated reserves of 5.3 million oz of gold. It is mined by conventional truck-shovel and drill-and-blast methods.
