= Ulur mine =

Graphite mine in Sakha, Russia

- Location: Sakha Republic, Russia
- Products: Graphite

The Ulur mine is one of the largest graphite mines in Russia and in the world. The mine is located in the east of the country in Sakha Republic. The mine has estimated reserves of 10 million tonnes of ore 30% graphite.
