= Ozyorny mine =

Mine in Russia

- Location: Buryatia, Russia
- Products: Lead, Zinc
- Company: MBC Corporation

The Ozyorny mine is one of the largest lead and zinc mines in Russia. The mine is located in south-eastern Russia in Buryatia. The mine has reserves amounting to 157 million tonnes of ore grading 1% lead and 5.2% zinc thus resulting 1.57 million tonnes of lead and 8.16 million tonnes of zinc. The mine also has reserves amounting to 800,000 oz of gold and 144 million oz of silver.
