= Kultumin mine =

Gold mine in Khabarovsk Krai, Russia

The Kultumin mine is a Russian gold mine in Khabarovsk Krai.
