= Usinskoe mine =

Manganese mine in Kemerovo, Russia

Coordinates: 54.01°N 88.71°E

- Location within Kemerovo Oblast Location within Russia
- Location: Kemerovo Oblast, Russia
- Products: Manganese

The Usinskoe mine is a mine located in the south of Russia in Kemerovo Oblast. Usinskoe represents one of the largest manganese reserve in Russia having estimated reserves of 276.5 million tonnes of manganese ore grading 19.1% manganese metal.
