= Kholodninsky mine =

Mine in Russia

- Location within Russia
- Location: Buryatia, Russia; 56°13′N 109°49′E
- Products: Lead, Zinc
- Company: MBC Corporation

The Kholodninsky mine is one of the largest lead and zinc mines in Russia. The mine is located in south-eastern Russia in Buryatia. The mine has reserves amounting to 519 million tonnes of ore grading 0.65% lead and 3.99% zinc thus resulting 3.37 million tonnes of lead and 21.2 million tonnes of zinc.
