= Zharchikhinski mine =

Molybdenum mine in Russia

- Location: Ulan-Ude, Buryatia, Russia
- Products: Molybdenum

The Zharchikhinski mine is one of the largest molybdenum mines in Russia. The mine is located near Ulan-Ude in south-east Russia in Buryatia. The Zharchikhinski mine has reserves amounting to 110 million tonnes of molybdenum ore grading 0.09% molybdenum thus resulting 100,000 tonnes of molybdenum.

== See also ==
- List of molybdenum mines
