= Metrekskoye mine =

Molybdenum mine in Russia

- Location: Abakan, Zabaykalsky Krai, Russia
- Products: Molybdenum

The Metrekskoye mine is one of the largest molybdenum mines in Russia. The mine is located near Abakan in south-west Russia in Zabaykalsky Krai. The Metrekskoye mine has reserves amounting to 47.5 million tonnes of molybdenum ore grading 0.1% molybdenum thus resulting 47,500 tonnes of molybdenum.

== See also ==
- List of molybdenum mines
