= Bugdai mine =

Gold mine in Russia

- Location: Zabaykalsky Krai, Russia
- Products: Gold

The Bugdai mine is one of the largest gold mines in Russia and in the world. The mine is located in Zabaykalsky Krai. The mine has estimated reserves of 22.4 million oz of gold, 54.4 million oz of silver and 594 million tonnes of ore grading 0.067% molybdenum.
