= Ulug Ulus =

Ulug Ulus or Uluγ Ulus may refer to:

- the Golden Horde
- the Mongol Empire
