= Gučevo (Rogatica) =

Gučevo Гучево
- Village
- Interactive map of Gučevo
- Coordinates: 43°50′50″N 18°58′18″E
- Country: Bosnia and Herzegovina
- Entity: Republika Srpska
- Municipality: Rogatica

Population
  - Total: 140
- Time zone: UTC+1 (CET)
  - Summer (DST): UTC+2 (CEST)

Gučevo (Serbian Cyrillic: Гучево) is a village in the Republika Srpska, Bosnia and Herzegovina. According to the 1991 census, the village is located in the municipality of Rogatica.
