= Medvezhy Ruchey mine =

Mine in Russia

- Location: Krasnoyarsk Krai, Russia
- Products: Copper

The Medvezhy Ruchey mine is a large copper mine located in the center of Russia in Krasnoyarsk Krai. Medvezhy Ruchey represents one of the largest copper reserves in Russia and in the world, having estimated reserves of 354.7 million tonnes of ore grading 0.39% copper.
