= Nezhdaninka mine =

Gold mine in Russia

- Location: Krasnoyarsk Krai, Russia
- Products: Gold

The Nezhdaninka mine is one of the largest gold mines in Russia and in the world. The mine is located in Krasnoyarsk Krai. The mine has estimated reserves of 16 million oz of gold.
