= Kyzyl-Tash, Altai Republic =

Kyzyl-Tash Кызыл-Таш
- Village
- Location within Altai Republic Location within Russia
- Coordinates: 50°12′N 87°56′E
- Country: Russia
- Region: Altai Republic
- District: Kosh-Agachsky District
- Time zone: UTC+7:00

Kyzyl-Tash (Russian: Кызыл-Таш; Altay: Кызыл-Таш, Kızıl-Taş) is a rural locality (a selo) in Kurayskoye Rural Settlement of Kosh-Agachsky District, the Altai Republic, Russia. The population was 785 as of 2016. There are 7 streets.

== Geography ==
Kyzyl-Tash is located 69 km northwest of Kosh-Agach (the district's administrative centre) by road. Kuray is the nearest rural locality.
