= Voznesenka, Buzdyaksky District, Republic of Bashkortostan =

Voznesenka Вознесенка
- Village
- Location within Bashkortostan Location within Russia
- Coordinates: 54°31′N 54°32′E
- Country: Russia
- Region: Bashkortostan
- District: Buzdyaksky District
- Time zone: UTC+5:00

Voznesenka (Russian: Вознесенка) is a rural locality (a village) in Gafuriysky Selsoviet, Buzdyaksky District, Bashkortostan, Russia. The population was 181 in 2010. There are three streets.

== Geography ==
Voznesenka is located 5 kilometres (3.1 mi) south of Buzdyak (the district's administrative centre) by road. Buzdyak is the nearest rural locality.
