= Suranskoye mine =

Fluorite mine in Russia

- Location: Bashkortostan, Russia
- Products: Fluorite

The Suranskoye mine is a large mine located in the south-western Russia in Bashkortostan. Suranskoye represents one of the largest fluorite reserves in Russia having estimated reserves of 2.01 million tonnes of ore grading 42.6% fluorite.
