= Voznesenka, Voronezh Oblast =

Voznesenka Вознесенка
- Selo
- Location within Voronezh Oblast Location within Russia
- Coordinates: 51°42′N 38°51′E
- Country: Russia
- Region: Voronezh Oblast
- District: Semiluksky District
- Time zone: UTC+3:00

Voznesenka (Russian: Вознесенка) is a rural locality (a selo) in Losevskoye Rural Settlement, Semiluksky District, Voronezh Oblast, Russia. The population was 261 as of 2010. There are 8 streets.

== Geography ==
Voznesenka is located on the right bank of the Veduga River, 19 km northwest of Semiluki (the district's administrative centre) by road. Losevo is the nearest rural locality.
