= Solonechnoye mine =

Fluorite mine in Russia

- Location: Primorsky Krai, Russia
- Products: Fluorite

The Solonechnoye mine is a large mine located in the south-eastern Russia in Primorsky Krai. Solonechnoye represents one of the largest fluorite reserves in Russia having estimated reserves of 2.8 million tonnes of ore grading 67% fluorite.
