= Noyon-Tologoisky mine =

Mine in Russia

- Location: Zabaykalsky Krai (Забайкальский край), Russia
- Products: Lead, Zinc

The Noyon-Tologoisky mine is one of the largest lead and zinc mines in Russia. The mine is located in southern Russia in Zabaykalsky Krai (In Russian - Забайкальский край). Along with other mines in eastern Transbaikalia, it has polymetallic ore deposits. The mine has reserves amounting to 14 million tonnes of ore grading 1.79% lead and 1.55% zinc thus resulting 0.25 million tonnes of lead and 0.22 million tonnes of zinc. The mine also has reserves amounting to 30.4 million oz of silver.
