= Taseevskoye mine =

Gold mine in Russia

Taseevskoye miine
- Location: Siberia, Russia
- Products: Gold

The Taseevskoye mine is one of the largest gold mines in Russia and in the world. The mine is located in Siberia. The mine has estimated reserves of 5.09 million oz of gold.
