= Ulug-Tanzekskoye mine =

Tantalum mine in Tuva, Russia

- Location: Tuva, Russia
- Products: Tantalum

The Ulug-Tanzekskoye mine is a large mine located in the southern part of Russia in Tuva. Ulug-Tanzekskoye represents one of the largest tantalum reserves in Russia having estimated reserves of 50 million tonnes of ore grading 0.01% tantalum.

== See also ==
- List of mines in Russia
