= Khiagdinskoye mine =

Uranium mine in Russia

- Location: Buryatia, Russia
- Products: uranium

The Khiagdinskoye mine is a large open pit mine located in the southern part of Russia in Buryatia. Khiagdinskoye represents one of the largest uranium reserves in Russia having estimated reserves of 22 million tonnes of ore grading 0.05% uranium.
