= Gusevogoroskoye mine =

Iron ore mine in Sverdlovsk, Russia

- Location: Sverdlovsk Oblast, Russia
- Products: Iron ore

The Gusevogoroskoye mine is a large iron mine located in western Russia in the Sverdlovsk Oblast. Gusevogoroskoye represents one of the largest iron ore reserves in Russia and in the world having estimated reserves of 2.82 billion tonnes of ore grading 15.7% iron metal.

== See also ==
- List of mines in Russia
