= Ulug Orda =

Ulug Orda or Uluğ Orda may refer to:

- the Crimean Khanate
- the Great Horde
