= Kingash mine =

Nickel mine in Krasnoyarsk Krai, Russia

- Location: Krasnoyarsk Krai, Russia
- Products: Nickel
- Company: Intergeo

The Kingash mine is a large mine in the north of Russia in the Krasnoyarsk Krai. Kingash represents one of the largest nickel reserve in Russia having estimated reserves of 219 million tonnes of ore grading 0.39% nickel. The 219 million tonnes of ore contains 0.85 million tonnes of nickel metal.
