= Voznesenka mine =

Fluorite mine in Russia

- Location: Primorsky Krai, Russia
- Products: Fluorite

The Voznesenka mine is a large mine located in the south-eastern Russia in Primorsky Krai. Voznesenka represents one of the largest fluorite reserves in Russia having estimated reserves of 450 million tonnes of ore grading 35% fluorite.
