= Kyzyltash, Russia =

Kyzyltash Кызылташ
- Village
- Location within Bashkortostan Location within Russia
- Coordinates: 52°27′N 56°47′E
- Country: Russia
- Region: Bashkortostan
- District: Kugarchinsky District
- Time zone: UTC+5:00

Kyzyltash (Russian: Кызылташ; Bashkir: Ҡыҙылташ, Qıźıltaş) is a rural locality (a village) in Kugarchinsky Selsoviet, Kugarchinsky District, Bashkortostan, Russia. The population was 3 as of 2010. There are 3 streets.

== Geography ==
Kyzyltash is located 33 km south of Mrakovo (the district's administrative centre) by road. 2-ye Tukatovo is the nearest rural locality.
