= List of iron mines =

This is a list of iron mines.

== North America ==
=== Canada ===
- Adams Mine
- Howells Lake-Howells River North mine
- KéMag mine
- LabMag mine
- Lac Otelnuk mine
- Lac Ritchie mine
- Mary River Mine
- Mont Wright (Quebec)
- Sheps-Perault Lake mine
- Sherman Mine

=== United States ===
- Benson Mines
- Cliffs Shaft Mine Museum
- Dorney Road Landfill
- Franklin Furnace
- Hibernia mines
- Hill-Annex Mine State Park
- Hull–Rust–Mahoning Open Pit Iron Mine
- The Iron Mine, Port Henry, New York
- Iron Mountain (Utah)
- Iron Mountain District
- Iron Mountain Mine
- Jackson Mine
- Lake Vermilion-Soudan Underground Mine State Park
- Lyon Mountain, New York
- Montreal Company Location Historic District
- Mountain Iron Mine
- Paulson Mine
- Pioneer Mine
- Portsmouth Mine Pit Lake
- Pyne Mine
- Rouchleau Mine
- Sloss Mines
- Sterling Lake
- Wenonah, Alabama

== South America ==
=== Bolivia ===
- El Mutún mine

=== Brazil ===
- Alegria mine
- Carajás Mine
- Corumbá (mine)
- Gongo Soco
- Minas-Rio
- S11D

=== Chile ===
- Boquerón Chañar (closed in the 1960s)
- Cerro Negro Norte
- Dominga (planned)
- El Algarrobo (closed 1998)
- El Carmen
- El Laco (closed in 1996)
- El Romeral mine
- El Tofo (closed 1974)
- Los Colorados
- Santo Domingo (planned)

=== Peru ===
- Marcona mine
- Pampa de Pongo

== Oceania ==
=== Australia ===
- Cairn Hill mine
- Iron Baron, South Australia
- Iron Knob

== Africa ==
=== Algeria ===
- Gâra Djebilet mine
- Ouenza mine

=== Angola ===
- Cassinga mine

=== Cameroon ===
- Mbalam mine
- Nkout mine

=== Congo-Brazzaville ===
- Nabeba mine

=== eSwatini ===
- Pigg's Peak mine

=== Guinea ===
- Kalia mine
- Mount Nimba mine
- Simandou mine

=== Liberia ===
- Bong mine
- Putu mine

=== Libya ===
- Shati Valley mine

=== Madagascar ===
- Bekisopa mine
- Betioky mine
- Fenoarivo mine
- Fenoarivo mine

=== Mauritania ===
- Askaf
- Kaouat mine
- Lebtheinia mine

=== Namibia ===
- Ongaba mine

=== Nigeria ===
- Agbaja mine
- Itakpe mine

=== The Republic of the Congo ===
- Zanaga mine
- Nabeba mine deposit shared with Mbabalm

=== Senegal ===
- Falémé mine

=== Sierra Leone ===
- Marampa mine
- Tonkolili mine

=== South Africa ===
- Beeshoek mine
- Khumani mine
- Sishen mine

=== Tanzania ===
- Liganga mine

=== Zimbabwe ===
- Mwanesi mine

== Europe ==
=== Austria ===
- Erzberg mine

=== Belarus ===
- Okulovsky mine

=== Bosnia and Herzegovina ===
- Ljubija mine

=== Finland ===
- Kolari mine
- Vuorokas mine

=== Germany ===
- Hansa Pit
- Huth Pit
- Konrad mine
- Roter Bär Pit

=== Greenland ===
- Isua Iron Mine
- Maamorilik

=== Norway ===
- Bjørnevatn mine

=== Portugal ===
- Mua mine

=== Romania ===
- Cacova Ierii mine
- Dognecea mine
- Gârliște mine
- Ghelari mine
- Lueta mine
- Muncelu Mic mine
- Ocna de Fier mine
- Rudăria-Bănia mine
- Băișoara mine
- Teliuc mine

=== Sweden ===
- Dannemora mine
- Herräng
- Kallak mine
- Kaunisvaara mine
- Kiruna mine
- Malmberget mine
- Mertainen
- Rällingsberg mining area
- Ruoutevare mine

=== Ukraine ===
- Belanovskoye mine
- Brovarkovskoye mine
- Gorishne mine
- Ingulets mine
- Kharchenkovskoye mine
- Manuilovskoye mine
- Shymanivske mine
- Vasilievskoye mine
- Yeristovskoye mine
- Zarudenskoye mine

=== United Kingdom ===
- Clearwell Caves
- Great Rock Mine
- Grinkle Mine
- Grosmont, North Yorkshire
- Hodbarrow RSPB reserve
- Kelly Mine, Devon
- Kilton Thorpe
- Lingdale
- North Skelton Mine
- Penrhyn Dû Mines
- Roseberry Mine
- Rosedale Chimney Bank
- Sharkham Point Iron Mine
- Warren Moor Mine

== Asia ==
=== Armenia ===
- Abovyan mine
- Hrazdan mine

=== China ===
- Baizhiyan mine
- Baoguosi mine
- Benxi mine
- Gongchangling mine
- Jinling mine
- Ma On Shan Iron Mine
- Pangjiapu mine
- Sanheming mine
- Shuichang mine
- Sijiaying mine
- Tadong mine
- Wuenduermiao mine
- Yuanjiachun mine
- Zhalanzhangzhi mine

=== Iran ===
- Gol Gohar mine

=== Japan ===
- Matsuo mine

=== Mongolia ===
- Tamir gol mine

=== North Korea ===
- Holdong mine
- Musan mine
- Oryong mine

=== Russia ===
- Abakanskoye mine
- Aldan mine
- Bakal mine
- Bakcharskoye mine
- Belokitatskoye mine
- Berezov mine
- Berezovskoye mine
- Chara mine
- Dyosovskoye mine
- Enashiminskoye mine
- Gar mine
- Gornaya Shoriya mine
- Gusevogoroskoye mine
- Gusevogorskoye mine
- Inskoye mine
- Itmatinskoye mine
- Karasugskoye mine
- Karelsky Okatysh mine
- Kavakta mine
- Kharlovskoye mine
- Kholzunskoye mine
- Korpanga mine
- Kostomuksha mine
- Kuznetsky Alatau mine
- Lebedinskiy mine
- Mikhaylovskiy mine
- Milkanskoye mine
- Nizhne-Angarskoye mine
- Olekma mine
- Olimpiyskoye mine
- Prioskolsky mine
- Sheregesh mine
- Sobstvenno-Kachkanarskoye mine
- Sukha Balka mine
- Tarynnakh mine
- Teiskoye mine
- Timir mine
- Toyozhnoye mine
- Turukhanskoye mine
- Tyya mine
- Yakovlevsky mine
- Yuzhno Khingan mine

=== Saudi Arabia ===
- Wadi Sawawin mine

=== South Korea ===
- Yemi mine

=== Turkey ===
- Attepe mine
- Avnik mine
- Divriği A-Kafa mine
- Divriği B-Kafa mine
- Hasançelebi mine
- Kesikköprü mine

=== Vietnam ===
- Quý Xa iron mine
- Thạch Khê iron mine

== See also ==
- List of countries by iron ore production
- Iron-ore exports by country
