= List of mines in Romania =

This is a list of mines in Romania. It is organized by product.

== Cobre ==
- Anina Mine
- Berbeşti Coal Mine
- Bărbăteni Coal Mine
- Comănești Coal Mine
- Câmpulung Coal Mine
- Căpeni Coal Mine
- Filipești Coal Mine
- Husnicioara Coal Mine
- Jilţ Coal Mine
- Livezeni Coal Mine
- Lonea Coal Mine
- Lupeni Coal Mine
- Motru Coal Mine
- Paroşeni Coal Mine
- Petrila Coal Mine
- Prigoria Coal Mine
- Rovinari Coal Mine
- Roşia – Peşteana Coal Mine
- Sărmăşag Coal Mine
- Uricani Coal Mine
- Voivozi Coal Mine
- Vulcan Coal Mine
- Şotânga Coal Mine
- Ţebea Coal Mine

== Iron ==
- Băişoara mine
- Dognecea mine
- Ghelari mine
- Lueta mine
- Muncelu Mic mine
- Ocna de Fier mine
- Teliuc mine
