= Kostomuksha =

Town in the Republic of Karelia, Russia

Kostomuksha Костомукша
- Town
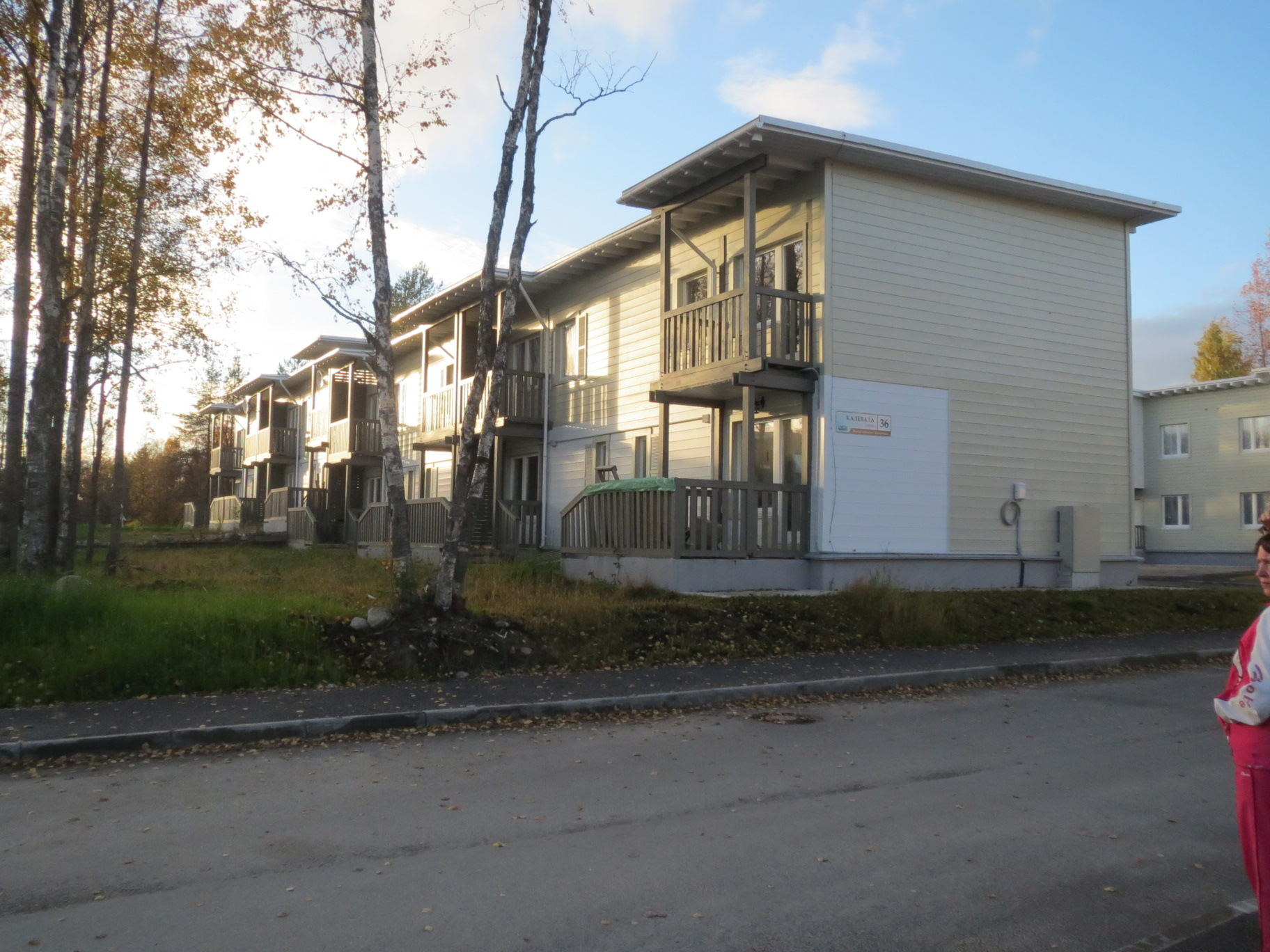
- Kontuvaara is a new district in Kostomuksha

- Flag Coat of arms
- Interactive map of Kostomuksha
- Location of Kostomuksha Kostomuksha (Karelia)
- Coordinates: 64°35′N 30°36′E
- Country: Russia
- Federal subject: Republic of Karelia
- Founded: 1977
- Town status since: 1983
- Elevation: 220 m (720 ft)

Population (2010 Census)
  - Total: 28,436
  - Estimate (2023): 25,928 (−8.8%)

Administrative status
  - Subordinated to: town of republic significance of Kostomuksha
  - Capital of: town of republic significance of Kostomuksha

Municipal status
  - Urban okrug: Kostomukshsky Urban Okrug
  - Capital of: Kostomukshsky Urban Okrug
- Time zone: UTC+3 (UTC+03:00)
- Postal code: 186930–186932
- OKTMO ID: 86706000001
- Website: www.kostomuksha-city.ru

Kostomuksha (Russian: Костому́кша; Karelian: Koštamuš; Finnish: Kostamus; Veps: Kostamukš) is a town in the northwest of the Republic of Karelia, Russia, located 30 kilometers (19 mi) from the border with Finland, on the shore of Lake Kontoki. Population: 29,746 (2002 census); 30,432 (1989 Soviet census).

== Geography ==
The nearest large cities in Russia are St. Petersburg and Petrozavodsk, which are connected to Kostomuksha by rail. The nearest towns in Finland are Kuhmo and Suomussalmi.

There is a large national park near the town with a reindeer population and a beaver population of Canadian origin, which were introduced in Finland and have migrated over into Russian territory. Part of the national park extends into Finnish territory. Tourism and recreational activities within the national park are subject to authorization.

== History ==
It was established in 1977 as an urban-type settlement and populated by people from various regions of the Northwestern Soviet Union. It was mostly built by Finnish building companies, according to an agreement between the Soviet and Finnish governments. Town status was granted to it in 1983. The town was later expanded by Soviet building companies but maintaining plenty of green areas.

== Administrative and municipal status ==
Within the framework of administrative divisions, it is, together with six rural localities, incorporated as the town of republic significance of Kostomuksha—an administrative unit with the status equal to that of the districts. As a municipal division, the town of republic significance of Kostomuksha is incorporated as Kostomukshsky Urban Okrug.

== Economy ==
The iron ore refinery JSC Karelsky Okatysh mine operates the Kostomuksha mine and employs approximately five thousand people and associated mining has left a huge hole near the factory. Wiring harness ("AEK" LLC) and electronics ("Electrokos" LLC) factories are part of Finnish company PKC Group Oyj. Other important industries include timber and furniture making. A wood processing complex being developed by Swedwood (an industrial group within IKEA) will include a sawmill, chip-board and furniture factory.

There is also a railway station, an airport (with no regular flights), and a federal road.

== Culture and recreation ==
Every summer there is a chamber music festival to which musicians, orchestras and theater groups come from Moscow, St. Petersburg, and other parts of Russia. In summer, the town enjoys more than two months of uninterrupted sunlight and many inhabitants spend time at their dachas, typically situated on the banks of one of the many lakes in the vicinity, which also attract anglers due to their large fish populations. As in Finland, saunas are very popular. In winter, skiing and biathlon are popular. Most visitors come from Finland.

== Sister city ==
- Kuhmo, Finland
- Robertsfors, Sweden
