= Țărmure =

Ţărmure may refer to several villages in Romania:

- Ţărmure, a village in Hălmagiu Commune, Arad County
- Ţărmure, a village in Sărmășag Commune, Sălaj County
