= Pralea Coal Mine =

Coal mine in Romania

Pralea Coal mine
- Location: Căiuți, Bacău County, Romania
- Products: Coal
- Company: Ploieşti National Coal Company

Pralea Coal Mine is an open-pit mining exploitation, one of the largest in Romania located in Căiuți, Bacău County with estimated coal reserves of 5.5 million tonnes. The legal entity managing the Pralea mine is the Ploieşti National Coal Company which was set up in 1957.
