= Radstube =

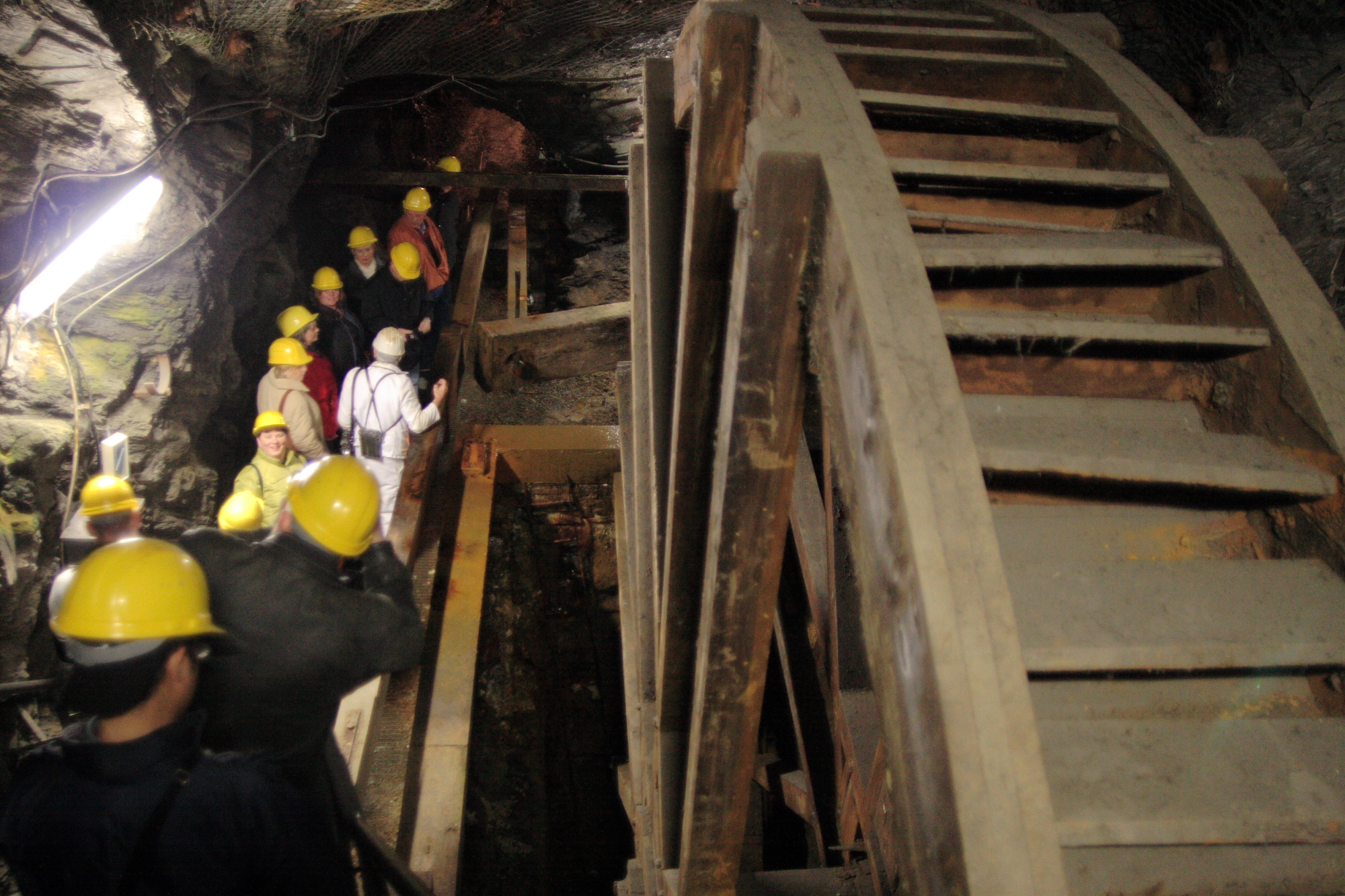
A Radstube with water wheel in the Rammelsberg Mine

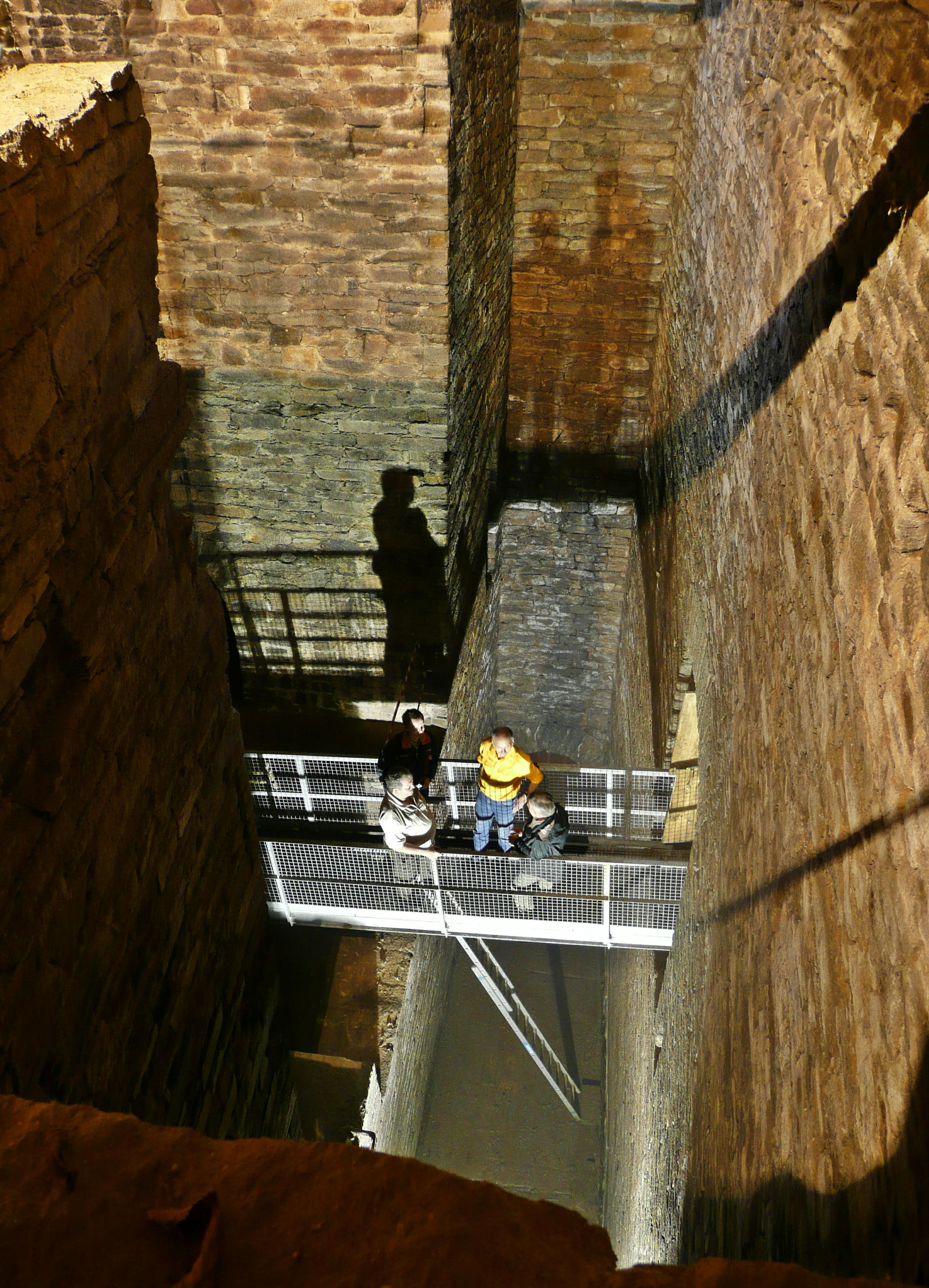
Reinsberg: looking into the Radstube chamber of the reversible water wheel of the Lichtloch IV of the Rothschönberger Stolln. In the Radstube used to be a wheel with a diameter of 11.9 metres and a width of 1.6 metres.

Radstube means something like "wheelhouse" or "wheel room" and is the German mining term for a surface or underground structure designed to house a water wheel in order to drive a flatrod system.

The fast-developing mining industry in Europe in the Middle Ages led to big increases in the quantities of materials used, mineshafts being sunk to ever increasing depths and, in particular, sharply rising demands on the water management of mines, all of which required suitable sources of power. One option for fulfilling these requirements was hydropower and the construction of water wheels. These were enclosed in buildings, or Radstuben, to protect them from the weather. The name Radstube was later also applied to underground chambers designed to accommodate a water wheel.

The installation of underground Radstuben was particularly difficult and expensive.

== Literature ==
- Alfred Nehls: Aller Reichtum lag in der Erde. Verlag Gronenberg, Gummersbach, 1993, ISBN 3-88265-180-6
