= Abovyan mine =

Iron ore mine in Armenia

Coordinates: 40.3°N 44.65°E

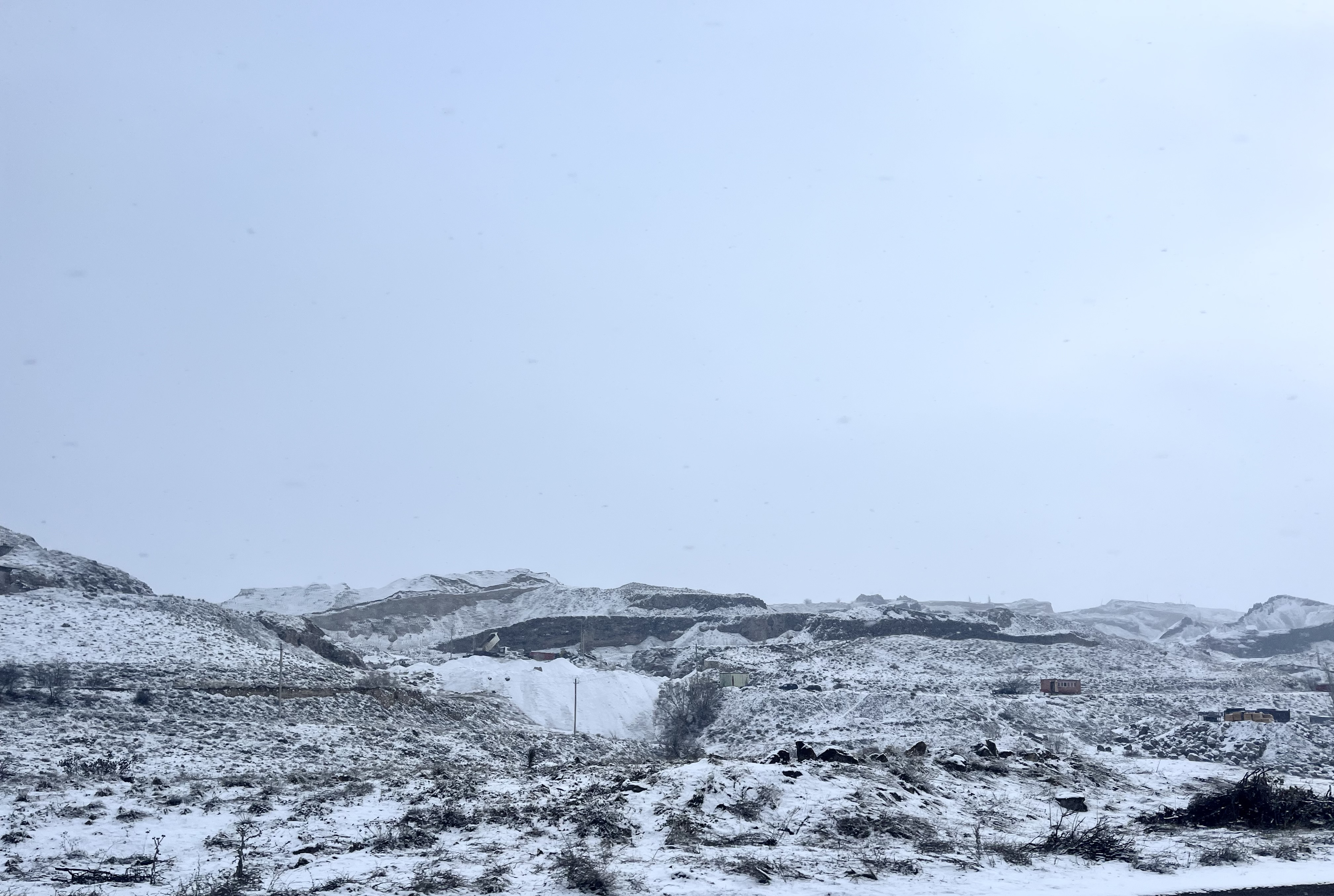

- Location within Armenia

Location
- Location: Abovyan, Kotayk Province, Armenia

Production
- Products: Iron

Owner
- Company
- Type: Private company

The Abovyan mine is a large iron mine operated by Fortune Oil in Kotayk Province, Armenia. Abovyan was reported to have an estimated reserve of 255 million tonnes of ore grading 40% iron, with 84 million tonnes being proven reserves, in 2011. Iron ore was first reported in the area in the 19th century and delineated in 1947.

== History ==
Iron ore was first reported in the area around Kaputan in the 19th century. The deposit was first delineated in 1947, based on magnetic anomalies. There is an estimated 255 million tonnes of ore grading 40% iron in the deposit according to a survey conducted in 2010. There was 84 million tonnes of proven reserves and 171 million tonnes of probable reserves. The mine has similar rail and water services to those at the Hrazdan mine.

The mineral concession rights were awarded to Fortune Oil. Fortune Oil stated in 2011, that it believed it could process 20 million tonnes per annum to produce 8 million tonnes per annum of iron ore concentrate. In 2011, protests against the Abovyan and Hrazdan mines took place in Hrazdan, Armenia, due to concerns about the impact that mines operated by Fortune Oil would have on the water supply in the region.

== Geography ==
The Abovyan mine is located 1,600 metres above sea level in the Gegham mountains of the Lesser Caucasus, which is part of the Tethyan metallogenic belt, and 22 kilometers (14 mi) northeast of Yerevan. The deposit in the mine is situated in volcanic rocks from the late Miocene to early Pliocene epoch. It is the second-youngest deposit of iron oxide-apatite after the deposit in El Laco.

== Works cited ==
=== Journals ===
- Nekrylov, Nikolai; Hovakimyan, Samvel; Meliksetian, Khachatur; Veress, Ervin (7 April 2025). "The role of evaporite in iron oxide-apatite ore deposit formation: Constraints of the late Miocene Abovyan deposit, Armenia". Lithos. 508. Elsevier.

=== News ===
- "Hrazdan Residents Plan Protest Against Iron Mine Exploitation". Epress. 7 November 2011. Archived from the original on 17 June 2025.

=== Web ===
- "Fortune Oil Acquires Significant Stake in Armenian Iron Ore Mines" (PDF). Fortune Oil. 12 January 2011. Archived from the original (PDF) on 4 March 2016.
- "Geologist: Abovyan Iron Mine Development More Dangerous than Harzdan Mine". Ecolur. 6 July 2011. Archived from the original on 17 June 2025.
