= Jinling (disambiguation) =

Jinling is a historic name for Nanjing, the provincial capital of Jiangsu province, China.

Jinling can also refer to:

- Jinling mine, mine in northern China
- Chu Jinling (Chinese: 楚金玲; born 1984), Chinese volleyball player
- Huang Jinling (Chinese: 曾金陵), Chinese structural chemist and educator
- Zeng Jinling (Chinese: 黄金陵), Taiwanese politician

== See also ==
- Jinling Shengmu, character in the 16th-century Chinese novel Fengshen Yanyi
