= Reformed Church, Ilișua =

Church building in Sărmășag, Romania

Reformed Church in Ilișua _{Református templom}
- Romania

Religion
- Affiliation: Reformed Church in Romania
- Region: Sălaj County
- Ecclesiastical or organizational status: parish church
- Year consecrated: 15th century

Location
- Location: Ilişua, Sălaj
- Municipality: Ilişua, Sălaj
- State: Romania
- Interactive map of Reformed Church in Ilișua _{Református templom}
- Coordinates: 47.29547°N 22.83674°E

The Reformed Church (Romanian: Biserica Reformată; Hungarian: Református templom) is a church in Ilişua, Sălaj, Romania, completed in the 15th century.
