= Ferrexpo =

Swiss-based commodity trading and mining company

Ferrexpo plc
- Type: Public
- Traded as: LSE: FXPO
- Industry: Iron Ore Mining and Processing
- Founded: 1960
- Headquarters: Baar (ZG), Switzerland; Horishni Plavni, Ukraine
- Key people: Lucio Genovese, Chairman; Nikolay Kladiev, CFO
- Products: Iron Ore Pellets
- Revenue: ▲$933.3 million (2024)
- Operating income: ▼$17.6 million (2024)
- Net income: ▲$(50.0) million (2024)
- Subsidiaries: PJSC Ferrexpo Poltava Mining, LLC Ferrexpo Yeristovo Mining, LLC Ferrexpo Belanovo Mining
- Website: www.ferrexpo.com

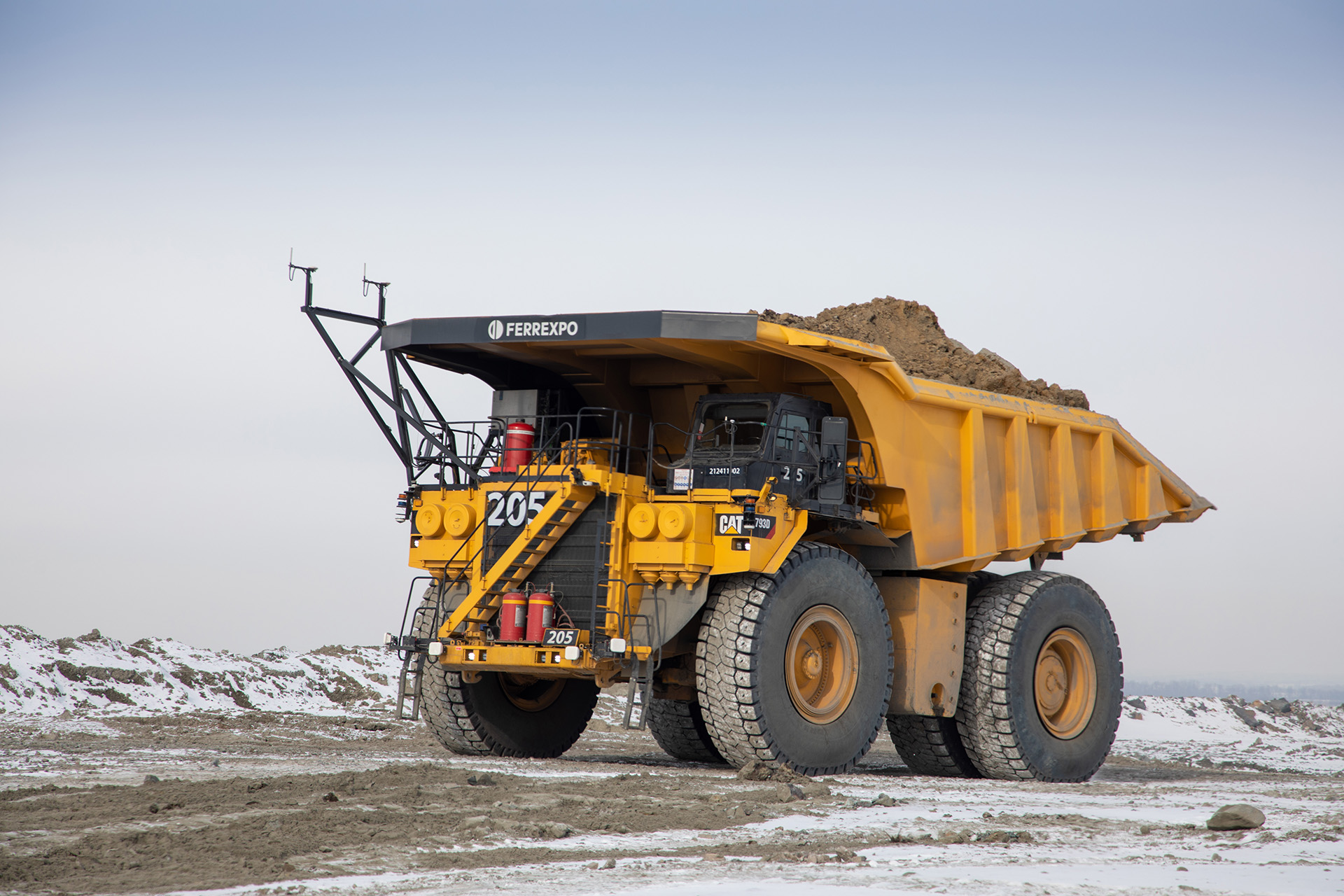
Ferrexpo unveiled Europe's first large scale autonomous haul trucks (CAT 793D) at its Yeristovo mine in late 2020.

Ferrexpo plc is a Swiss-based commodity trading and mining company which is the third largest exporter of iron ore pellets in the world. Ferrexpo's operating base is in central Ukraine, where it operates three iron-ore mines and an iron ore pellet production facility. The company's trading office is located in London where it is listed on the London Stock Exchange. It is also a constituent of the FTSE4Good Index.

== History ==
The business was founded by the Soviet government in 1960 as the "Poltava Mining and Extraction Combinat" to exploit iron ore reserves in Horishni Plavni (formerly Komsomolsk), Ukraine. In 1977 it started selling its product in the form of iron ore pellets.

In June 2007, Ferrexpo plc was listed on the London Stock Exchange, producing 8.6 million tonnes of iron ore pellets in the year prior to listing.

In 2008 and 2009 the company established additional new complexes around Horishni Plavni and Kremenchuk. In 2011, the Company opened its second iron ore mine, the Yeristovo mine, which is located immediately north of the Company's main iron ore mine - the Poltava iron ore mine. Upon opening Yeristovo, Ferrexpo became the first company to open a new mine in Ukraine since the country's independence.

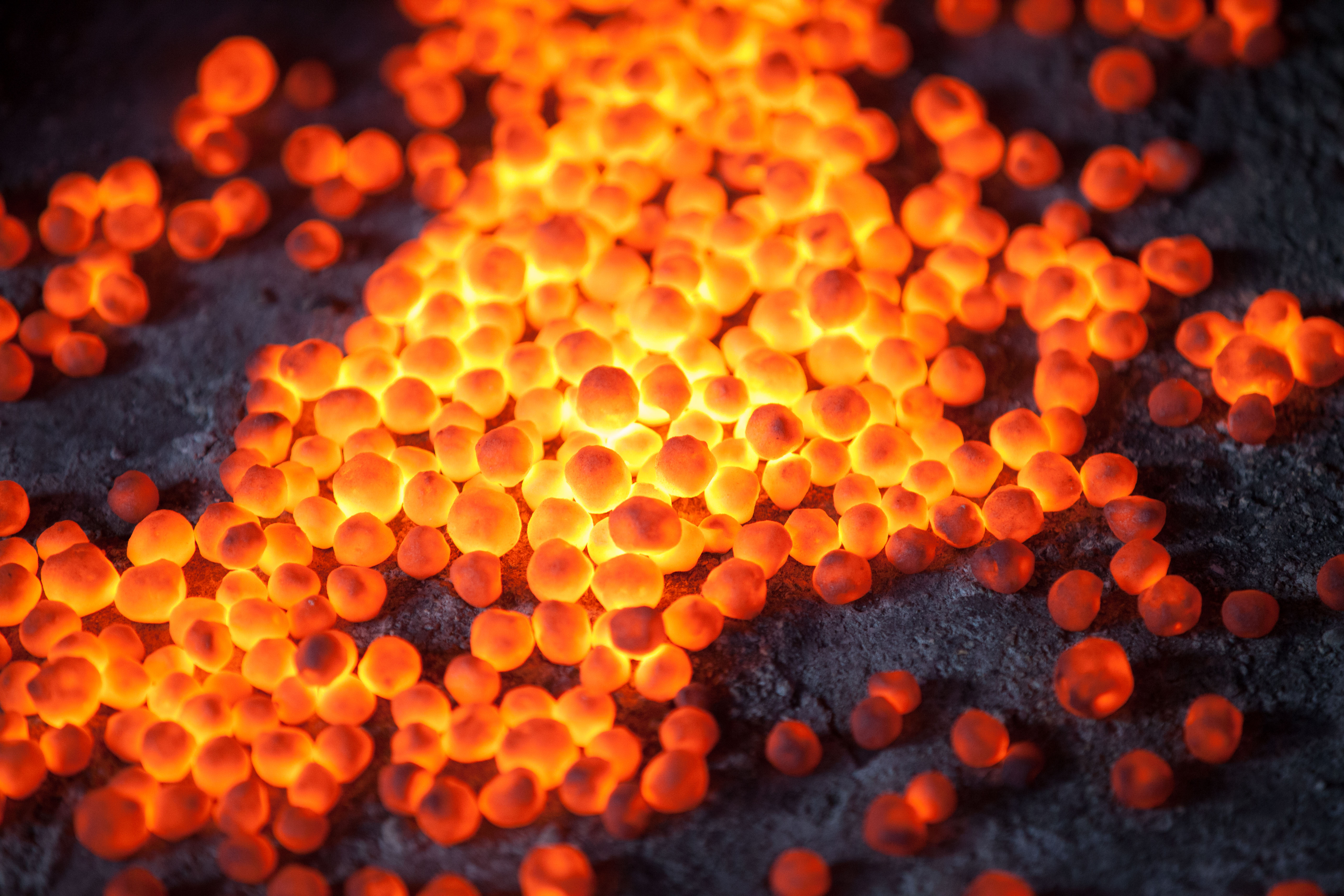
Ferrexpo produces high grade iron ore pellets, which are a premium product for use in the steel industry.

In March 2019 the company delayed publication of its results pending an investigation into charitable donations in Ukraine. In April 2019 its auditors Deloitte resigned, with Ferrexpo's former chief financial officer selling £400,000 of shares the day before the announcement. In August 2019 Ferrexpo announced that the charitable donations may have been misappropriated; it had donated $24 million to the charity in 2017 and $9.5 million in 2018. In October 2019, the CEO, Kostyantyn Zhevago, stood down from his post, following allegations of the embezzlement of $113 million from the Finance & Credit Bank.

Following Zhevago's departure, Jim North became acting CEO; the company announced his appointment as permanent CEO in February 2022.

On 28 April 2026, the company announced that, in the context of the Russo-Ukrainian war, the company would need US$100 million in new financing; however, because the company was unable to meet the conditions required by the new lenders before 30 April 2026, the company's listing on the London Stock Exchange would be suspended.

== Operations ==
Ferrexpo produces iron ore pellets, which are used in the global steel industry to produce high quality types of steel. Iron ore pellets are the highest quality form of iron ore that steel producers can utilise, offering steel producers the opportunity to improve blast furnace productivity, whilst simultaneously reducing carbon emissions by at least 30% for every tonne of pellets used instead of the more commonly used sinter fines, which are typically lower grade and require sintering prior to charging into the blast furnace.

The Company, which sells most of its product to steel mills of Central Europe and Asia, is organised into the following units:

- Ukraine - mining
- Switzerland - home base
- London - registered office, trading
- Dubai - distribution and sale
- Singapore - distribution and sale
- Shanghai - distribution and sale
- Tokyo - distribution and sale

The company's mining components are all based in central Ukraine and consist of:

- Poltava Mining and Enrichment Complex (1970s), Horishni Plavni
- Yeristovo Mining and Enrichment Complex (2008), Yerystivka village, Kremenchuk Raion (see: Yeristovskoye mine)
- Belanovo Mining and Enrichment Complex (est. 2009, under construction), Bazaluky village and Nova Haleshchyna, Kremenchuk Raion (see: Belanovskoye mine)

Additionally, the company owns several nearby iron deposits which are not yet being actively exploited. From north to south, these are:

- Brovarkovskoye mine
- Manuilovskoye mine
- Kharchenkovskoye mine
- Vasilievskoye mine
- Zarudenskoye mine

== Ownership ==
The founder, Kostyantyn Zhevago, owns 50.3% of the company. Kostyantyn Zhevago was arrested in December 2022 under an international arrest warrant, he is wanted in Ukraine in a major embezzlement case.
