= Belanovskoye mine =

Iron mine in Ukraine

- Location within Ukraine
- Location: Poltava Oblast, Ukraine; 49.1523°N 33.6994°E
- Products: Iron ore
- Opened: 2018
- Company: Ferrexpo plc
- Website: www.ferrexpo.com/what-we-do/operations/belanovo/

The Belanovskoye mine is a large iron mine located in central Ukraine in the Poltava Oblast. Belanovskoye represents one of the largest iron ore reserves in Ukraine and in the world having estimated reserves of 1.7 billion tonnes of ore grading 31% iron metal. The mine is 2km north of the Yeristovskoye mine and immediately south of the Zarudenskoye mine, both which are also iron deposits owned by Ferrexpo.

== Resources ==
- "Ferrexpo Annual Report 2013" (PDF). Archived from the original (PDF) on 2016-10-18.
