= List of countries by iron-ore exports =

The following are lists of countries by iron ore imports and exports.

== Exports ==
Data is for 2024, in United States dollars, from the Observatory of Economic Complexity.

List of countries by iron ore exports (2023)
Country	Trade value
Australia	93,204,202,612
Brazil	31,350,571,064
Canada	7,193,569,114
South Africa	6,971,379,691
India	3,766,948,185
Sweden	3,445,684,228
Oman	1,879,465,485
Ukraine	1,846,139,900
Bahrain	1,822,632,760
Chile	1,700,663,178
Peru	1,682,665,970
United States	1,462,494,946
Mauritania	1,360,421,827
Iran	1,296,908,459
Russia	1,222,725,326
China	1,121,331,018
Malaysia	1,074,514,388
Sierra Leone	897,113,387
Kazakhstan	792,259,131
Laos	384,156,499
Mongolia	364,638,755
Liberia	342,925,419
Norway	307,543,900
Turkey	218,533,239
Germany	179,513,973
New Zealand	136,546,367
Mexico	122,096,427
United Arab Emirates	115,698,870
Vietnam	113,391,735
Venezuela	93,388,435
Pakistan	86,845,673
Uganda	65,071,485
Indonesia	60,900,549
Switzerland	58,621,326
Cambodia	55,165,270
Thailand	54,022,417
Romania	49,828,394
South Korea	41,357,786
Singapore	39,160,630
Netherlands	28,219,756
Libya	24,654,126
Mali	21,934,546
Egypt	21,012,415
United Kingdom	17,486,336
Spain	16,959,754
Saudi Arabia	15,941,379
Bolivia	14,792,563
Myanmar	14,776,150
Philippines	14,375,672
Qatar	13,442,231
Mauritius	11,987,341
France	11,764,538
Uzbekistan	10,325,920
Algeria	9,234,281
Cuba	8,322,492
Trinidad and Tobago	7,932,889
Bulgaria	7,494,533
Honduras	6,659,715
Nigeria	5,774,158
Uruguay	5,701,951
Hungary	5,221,201
Fiji	4,246,462
Finland	2,922,208
Belgium	2,679,576
Colombia	1,805,871
Italy	1,554,185
Japan	1,385,694
Slovakia	1,189,011
Hong Kong	912,312
Luxembourg	871,607
Albania	843,571
Bahamas	574,187
Slovenia	536,253
Morocco	517,749
Zimbabwe	352,908
Botswana	218,371
Serbia	216,018
Jordan	215,814
Poland	213,418
Austria	206,986
Kenya	185,366
Greece	153,697
Ireland	145,621
Denmark	90,379
Bosnia and Herzegovina	85,057
Namibia	80,780
Czech Republic	79,376
Portugal	43,327
Lithuania	23,383
Guinea	22,503
Estonia	20,750
Gabon	13,609
Georgia	12,525
Tanzania	9,769
Marshall Islands	8,000
North Macedonia	7,642
Latvia	6,663
Guatemala	6,530
Kuwait	5,356
Ghana	4,516
Guinea-Bissau	4,368
Israel	4,000
Taiwan	3,541
Croatia	3,230
Montenegro	3,215
Eritrea	1,955
Congo	1,925
Paraguay	1,855
Mozambique	1,801
Cameroon	1,799
Argentina	1,177
Angola	894
Guyana	561
Senegal	450
Ethiopia	356
Papua New Guinea	313
Zambia	267
Malawi	195
Tajikistan	176
Malta	147
Cyprus	79
Cote d'Ivoire	51
New Caledonia	51
Curacao	44
Tunisia	33
Madagascar	5
Ecuador	5

== Imports ==
Data is for 2024, in thousands of United States dollars and tons, from the International Trade Centre.

List of countries by iron ore imports (2024)
Country	Value imported (thousands USD)	Trade balance (thousands USD)	Quantity imported (tons)
World	181,616,315	−28,902,561	0
China	133,226,590	−130,286,533	1,237,266,528
Japan	11,284,102	−11,283,810	96,402,231
South Korea	8,255,792	−8,237,213	69,487,783
Germany	4,204,095	−4,029,536	34,875,248
Taiwan	2,286,423	−2,286,423	20,058,925
Egypt	1,657,636	−1,657,636	0
Malaysia	1,600,254	−318,943	21,283,320
Indonesia	1,519,829	−1,519,829	13,915,134
Vietnam	1,468,435	−1,440,200	17,757,895
Bahrain	1,225,393	−766,209	13,509,609
Turkey	1,207,462	−1,020,917	10,006,113
France	1,148,852	−1,129,835	9,868,711
Netherlands	1,046,558	−872,691	0
Oman	954,081	759,029	12,408,822
United States	834,204	226,103	4,918,688
Philippines	797,166	−434,974	6,290,006
Canada	777,364	5,610,989	8,001,413
Belgium	766,724	−761,891	6,397,875
Algeria	693,484	−688,276	5,617,316
Argentina	652,865	−652,865	4,460,787
Poland	517,433	−515,867	0
Spain	515,449	−513,679	0
India	513,935	2,235,083	5,201,833
Slovakia	472,208	−470,390	4,717,774
United Kingdom	438,534	−437,434	3,409,897
Finland	436,834	−436,292	2,690,372
Italy	412,593	−412,284	0
Czech Republic	400,460	−400,257	2,804,150
Trinidad and Tobago	390,490	−390,490	1,991,936
Russia	379,601	635,227	4,612,385
Saudi Arabia	331,535	−330,588	1,821,765
Libya	263,403	−255,474	2,157,505
Qatar	226,034	−220,274	1,604,345
United Arab Emirates	199,705	−99,995	1,342,522
Serbia	170,258	−170,258	1,307,673
Australia	90,091	82,879,030	1,001,767
Romania	76,091	−74,262	0
Kenya	60,879	−60,879	738,957
Chile	36,607	1,517,849	277,196
Mozambique	23,347	−22,440	106,849
Sweden	13,262	2,596,054	79,388
Denmark	5,193	−5,192	0
Brazil	4,956	29,855,230	30,953
Kyrgyzstan	4,075	−4,075	57,853
Norway	3,307	131,649	26,357
Nepal	2,956	−2,956	227,954
Greece	2,507	−2,507	0
Iceland	2,148	−2,148	11,959
Switzerland	1,466	−1,368	10,670
Thailand	1,337	19,176	4,510
Mexico	1,253	−1,083	0
Paraguay	1,127	−1,127	20,589
Portugal	956	−956	0
Jordan	947	−947	24,998
Bulgaria	900	71	0
Iraq	789	−788	28,278
Hungary	674	12,087	0
Turkmenistan	654	−654	248
Mongolia	544	597,027	1,961
Congo	473	−410	1,475
Ukraine	414	2,802,792	2,042
Armenia	363	−363	955
Moldova	289	−289	7,545
Georgia	285	−257	10,953
Pakistan	277	52,339	1,892
Tanzania	220	−219	684
Estonia	188	−188	504
Botswana	180	−169	918
Israel	172	−172	1,430
Slovenia	168	−157	510
South Africa	154	6,340,533	3,121
Croatia	129	−128	4,228
Guatemala	129	−127	182
Ethiopia	127	−127	303
Iran	108	1,133,593	2,946
North Macedonia	106	167	3,580
New Zealand	91	124,453	288
Kuwait	89	−89	94
Bahamas	50	−50	698
Colombia	42	−42	37
Sierra Leone	40	847,717	160
Luxembourg	39	−39	0
Cyprus	38	−38	72
El Salvador	38	−38	12
Ireland	35	−34	0
Zambia	35	−35	142
Bosnia and Herzegovina	28	477	72
Lithuania	23	−20	2
Kazakhstan	22	780,698	30
Uzbekistan	22	−22	20
Zimbabwe	20	125	90
Gabon	20	1,291	245
Namibia	10	107	38
Singapore	9	−7	5
Eswatini	6	−6	35
Antigua and Barbuda	5	−5	0
Bolivia	4	12,528	3
Peru	4	1,787,163	22
Laos	4	482,328	47
Burkina Faso	4	−4	12
Malawi	3	−3	6
Bangladesh	3	−3	1
Cambodia	2	23,850	4
Nigeria	2	85	6
Guinea	1	20,784	1
Honduras	1	−1	1

== See also ==
- List of iron mines
- List of countries by iron ore production

== Sources ==
- atlas.media.mit.edu − Observatory of Economic complexity − Countries that export Iron Ore (2012)
- atlas.media.mit.edu − Observatory of Economic complexity − Countries that export Iron Ore (2016)
