= KéMag mine =

Iron ore mine in Quebec, Canada

- Location: Quebec, Canada
- Products: Iron ore

The KéMag mine is a large iron mine located in east Canada in Quebec. KéMag represents one of the largest iron ore reserves in Canada and in the world having estimated reserves of 3.5 billion tonnes of ore grading 26.5% iron metal.

== See also ==
- List of iron mines
