= Șotânga =

- Commune
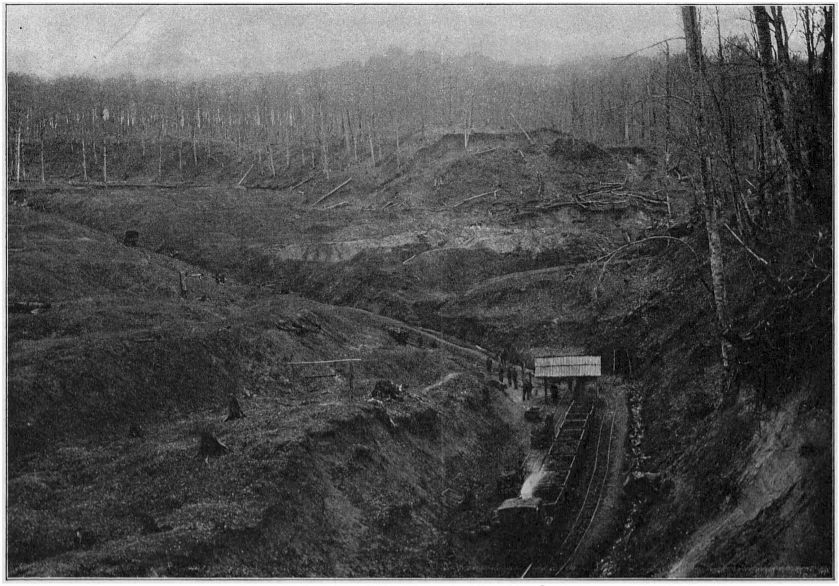
- Open-pit lignite mine Șotânga-Mărgineanca, 1899

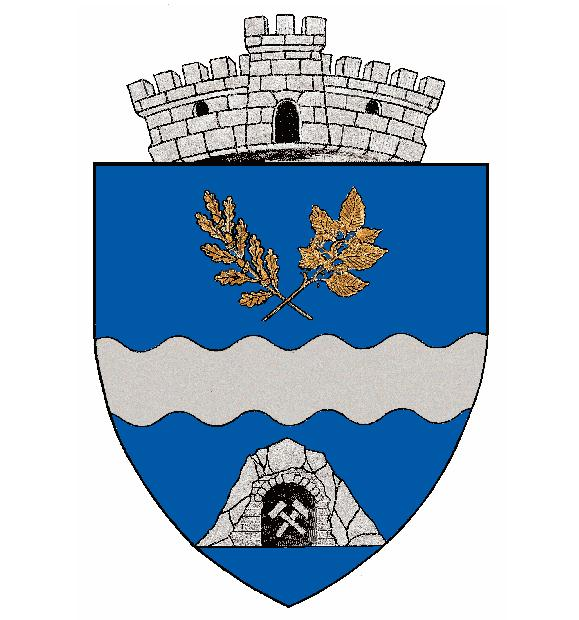
- Coat of arms

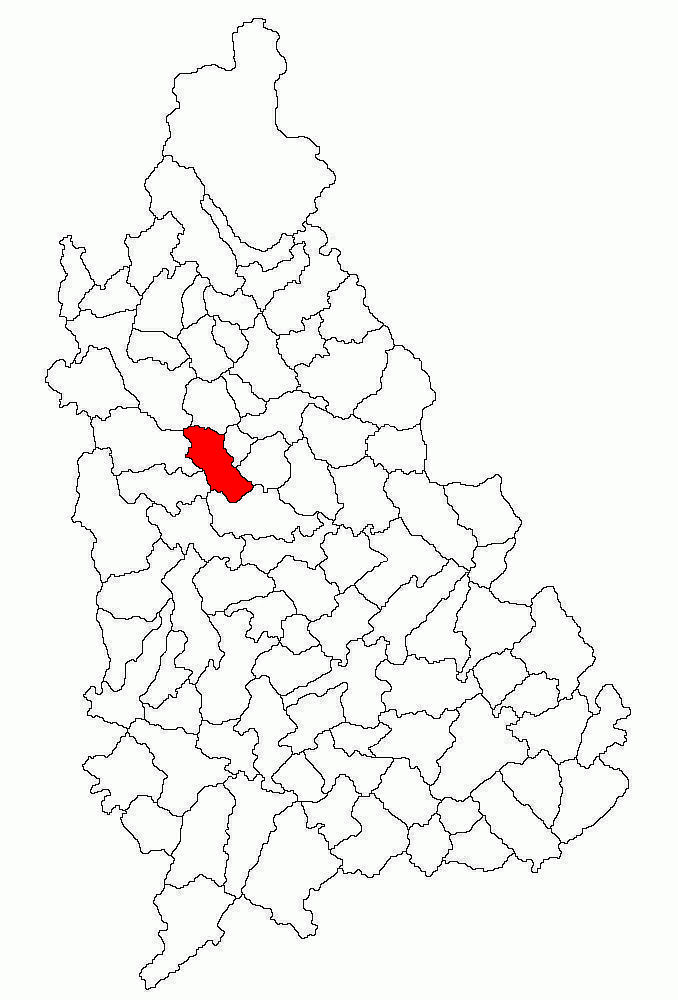
- Location in Dâmbovița County

- Location in Romania
- Coordinates: 44°59′N 25°22′E
- Country: Romania
- County: Dâmbovița

Government
  - Mayor (2024–2028): Constantin Stroe (PSD)
- Area: 35.15 km^{2} (13.57 sq mi)
- Elevation: 327 m (1,073 ft)
- Population (2021-12-01): 7,077
  - Density: 201.3/km^{2} (521.5/sq mi)
- Time zone: UTC+02:00 (EET)
  - Summer (DST): UTC+03:00 (EEST)
- Postal code: 137430
- Area code: +(40) 245
- Vehicle reg.: DB
- Website: www.sotanga.ro

Șotânga is a commune in Dâmbovița County, Muntenia, Romania with a population of 7,077 as of 2021. It is composed of two villages, Șotânga and Teiș. The Șotânga Coal Mine was a local open-pit and underground lignite mine.

Historical population
Year	Pop.	±%
2002	7,015	—
2011	7,143	+1.8%
2021	7,077	−0.9%
Source: Census data

== Natives ==
- Dona Dumitru Siminică (1926–1979), violinist and singer of lăutar music

== See also ==
- Teiș oil field
