= Câmpulung Coal Mine =

Coal mine in Romania

Câmpulung Coal mine
Location
- Location: Câmpulung, Argeș County, Romania

Production
- Products: Coal
- Production: 580,000 tonnes
- Financial year: 2008

History
- Opened: 1846

Owner
- Company: Ploiești National Coal Company

Câmpulung Coal Mine is an open-pit mining exploitation, one of the largest in Romania. It is located in Câmpulung, Argeș County, with estimated coal reserves of 16.5 million tonnes. The legal entity managing the Câmpulung mine is the Ploiești National Coal Company, which was set up in 1957.
