= Șotânga Coal Mine =

Coal mine in Romania

Șotânga Coal mine
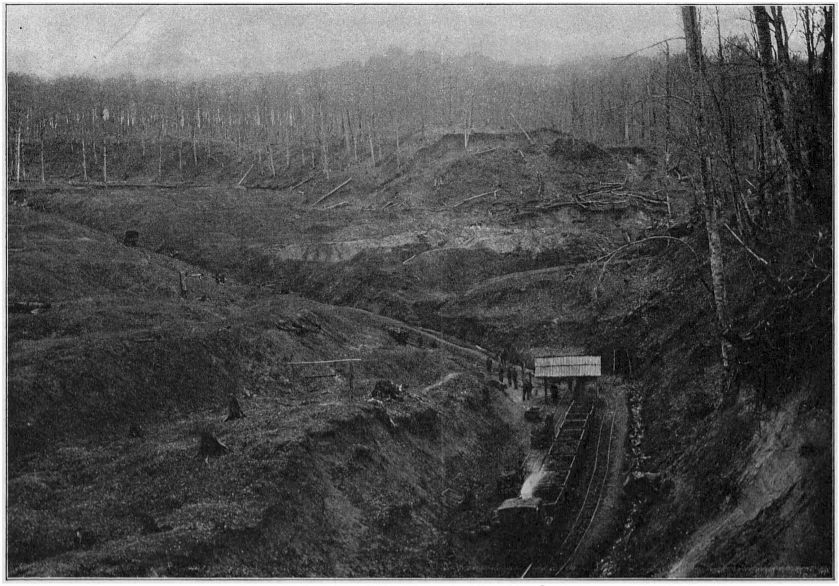
- Șotânga open-pit lignite mine, 1899
- Location: Șotânga, Dâmbovița County, Romania
- Products: Coal
- Production: 180,000 tonnes
- Financial year: 2008
- Opened: 1859
- Company: Ploieşti National Coal Company

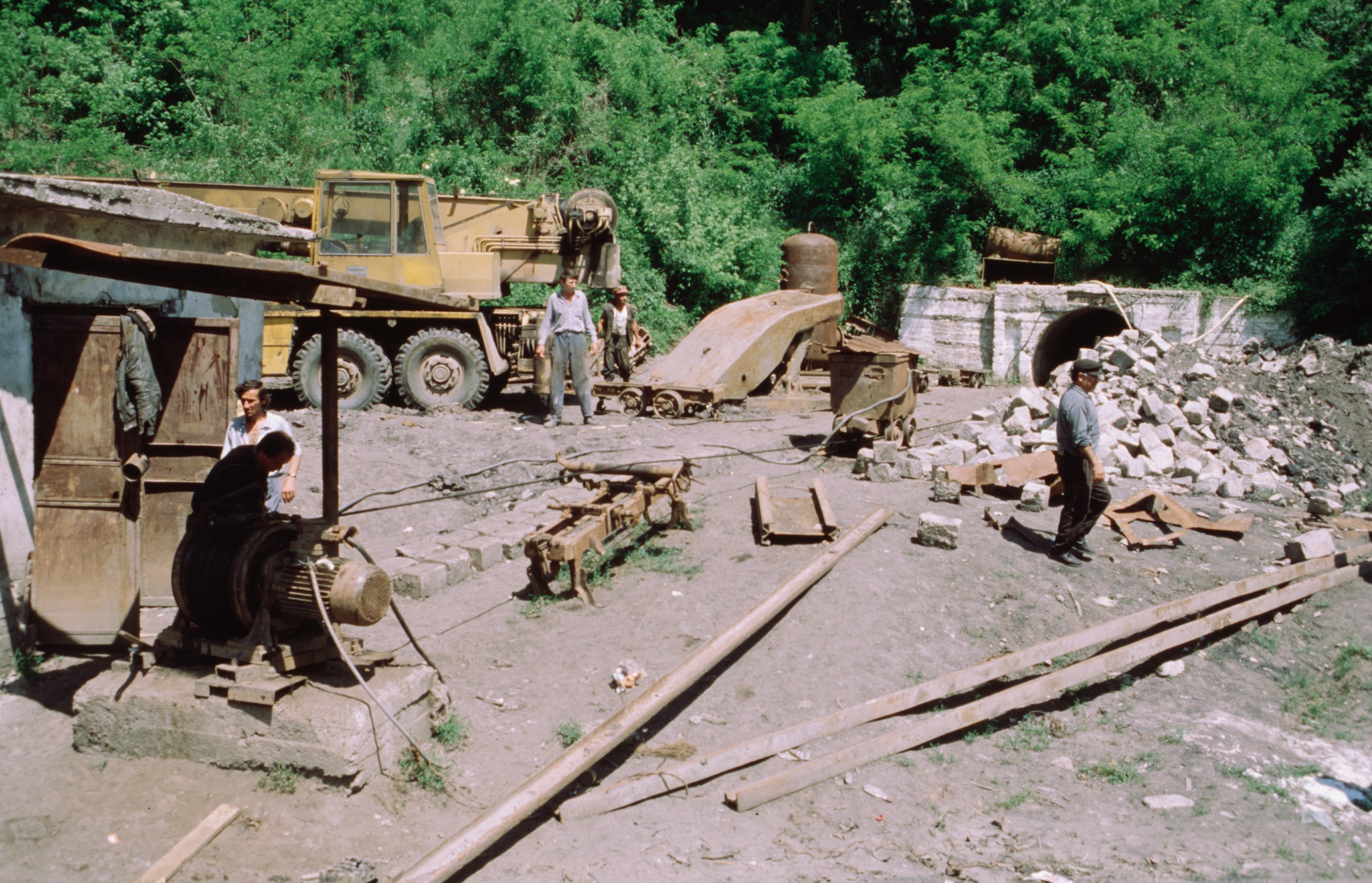
Remains of the 600 mm (1 ft 11 5/8 in) mining railway at Șotânga-Margineanca, 1999

Șotânga Coal Mine is an open-pit mining exploitation, one of the largest in Romania located in Șotânga, Dâmbovița County with estimated coal reserves of 5.01 million tonnes. The legal entity managing the Șotânga mine is the Ploieşti National Coal Company which was set up in 1957.
