= Huth Pit =

Mine in Rhineland-Palatinate, Germany

Huth
- Interactive map of Huth
- Location: Hamm (Sieg),Altenkirchen, Rhineland-Palatinate,Germany; 50°45′52.6″N 7°41′10.1″E
- Products: iron ore
- Greatest depth: 465 m
- Opened: 1560
- Closed: September 1944
- Company: Bergrevier Hamm an der Sieg

The Huth Pit (German: Grube Huth) was a mine on the territory of Hamm (Sieg) in the county of Altenkirchen in the German state of Rhineland-Palatinate.

It is first recorded in 1560. In 1763 a consolidation took place. In 1867 underground mining was begun. The Old Shaft (Alte Schacht) of the pit had a depth of 270 metres.

Spathic (carbonate) iron ores containing rhodochrosite were used around 1870s to produce spiegeleisen, a historically important ferromanganese alloy used in steelmaking.

Between 1890 and 1937 the mine was closed; it was then re-opened. That year a new shaft was driven, which had a diameter of 3.9 metres and reached a depth of 410 metres. The total depth (Gesamtteufe) of the pit was 465 metres. It had 70 employees and was close in September 1944.

== See also ==
- Mining in the Siegerland
