= Sărmășag Coal Mine =

Coal mine in Sălaj County, Romania

Sărmășag Coal mine
- Location: Sărmășag, Sălaj County, Romania
- Products: Coal
- Production: 380,000 tonnes
- Financial year: 2008
- Opened: 1846
- Company: Ploiești National Coal Company

Sărmășag Coal Mine is an open-pit mining exploitation, one of the largest in Romania located in Sărmășag, Sălaj County with estimated coal reserves of 10.6 million tonnes. The legal entity managing the Sărmășag mine is the Ploiești National Coal Company which was set up in 1957.
