= Shati Valley mine =

Iron ore mine in Libya

- Location: Libya
- Products: Iron ore

The Shati Valley mine is a large iron mine located in east Libya. With estimated reserves of 3.5 billion tonnes of ore grading 55% iron metal, Shati Valley represents one of the largest iron ore reserves in Libya and in the world.

== See also ==
- List of iron mines
