= Căpeni Coal Mine =

Open-pit coal mine in Romania

Căpeni Coal mine
Location
- Location: Baraolt, Covasna County, Romania

Production
- Products: Coal
- Production: 300,000 tonnes
- Financial year: 2008

History
- Opened: 1867

Owner
- Company: Ploieşti National Coal Company

Căpeni Coal Mine is an open-pit mining exploitation, one of the largest in Romania located in Baraolt, Covasna County with estimated coal reserves of 8.4 million tonnes. The legal entity managing the Căpeni mine is the Ploieşti National Coal Company which was set up in 1957.
