= Teiș oil field =

Oil field in Romania

Teiș
- Country: Romania
- Region: Dâmbovița County
- Offshore/onshore: onshore
- Operator: Petrom

Field history
- Discovery: 1974
- Start of production: 1975

Production
- Current production of oil: 2,000 barrels per day (~100,000 t/a)
- Estimated oil in place: 27.8 million tonnes (~ 32.9×10^{6} m^{3} or 207 million bbl)

The Teiș oil field is an oil field located in Șotânga, Dâmbovița County. It was discovered in 1974 and developed by Petrom. It began production in 1975 and produces oil and natural gas. The total proven reserves of the Teiș oil field are around 207 million barrels (27.8 million tonnes), and production is centered on 2,000 barrels per day (320 m^{3}/d).
