= Kolari mine =

Iron ore mine in Lapland, Finland

- Location: Lapland, Finland
- Products: Iron ore

The Kolari mine is a large iron mine located in northern Finland in the Lapland. Kolari represents one of the largest iron ore reserves in Finland and in the world having estimated reserves of 500 million tonnes of ore grading 35% iron metal.

== See also ==
- List of iron mines
