= Aethel Mining =

British mining company

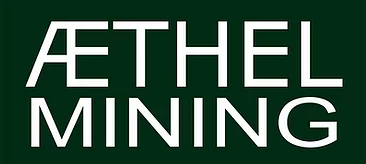
- Type: Private
- Industry: Mining
- Founded: 2015; 11 years ago
- Headquarters: London, United Kingdom
- Key people: Ricardo Santos Silva and Aba Schubert
- Products: Iron ore
- Website: www.aethelmining.com

Aethel Mining is a British mining company headquartered in London and owned by Ricardo Santos Silva and Aba Schubert. Aethel Mining is the operator of the Torre de Moncorvo mines in Portugal, the largest private iron ore deposit in Europe. The mine had been dormant for over 37 years before the Portuguese Directorate-General for Energy and Geology gave the mining concession to Aethel Mining in November 2019.

The Portuguese state cancelled the Moncorvo concession for "legal and contractual non-compliance" in April 2025.

== History ==
The company was founded in 2015 in the United Kingdom, after its predecessor Aethel Mining Portugal Limited was founded in 2012. In 2019 it obtained the concession and control of the Torre de Moncorvo mines in Portugal from the Portuguese government. It started its operations at the mine in 2020.

In 2011, before the company was founded, Rio Tinto made an offer of over 1 billion euros for the Torre de Moncorvo mines. However, Rio Tinto later decided to withdraw from the project, opting to focus on a narrower range of mine developments, such as iron ore projects in Western Australia and Guinea, and the Oyu Tolgoi copper project in Mongolia.

== Operations and production ==
The mine produces iron ore.

As of 2023, the Torre de Moncorvo mines had proven and probable reserves of 558 million tons, with an additional 254 million tons of possible reserves. They were valued at approximately 58.2 billion euros. This valuation corresponds to about one-third of the wealth in Portugal, highlighting the potential economic impact of the mine's development and operation on the local and national economies.

The Portuguese state cancelled the Moncorvo concession for "legal and contractual non-compliance" in April 2025.

- Iron Ore
- Torre de Moncorvo
- Rio Tinto
- LKAB
