= Filipești Coal Mine =

Coal mine in Romania

Filipești Coal mine
- Location: Filipeștii de Pădure, Prahova County, Romania
- Products: Coal
- Production: 300,000 tonnes
- Financial year: 2008
- Opened: 1906
- Company: Ploiești National Coal Company

Filipești Coal Mine is an open-pit mining exploitation, one of the largest in Romania located in Filipeștii de Pădure, Prahova County with estimated coal reserves of 8.4 million tonnes. The legal entity managing the Filipești mine is the Ploieşti National Coal Company which was set up in 1957.
