= Voivozi Coal Mine =

Coal mine in Bihor County, Romania

Voivozi Coal mine
- Location: Popeşti, Bihor County, Romania
- Products: Coal
- Production: 140,000 tonnes
- Financial year: 2008
- Opened: 1877
- Company: Ploieşti National Coal Company

Voivozi Coal Mine is an open-pit mining exploitation, one of the largest in Romania located in Popeşti, Bihor County with estimated coal reserves of 3.9 million tonnes. The legal entity managing the Voivozi mine is the Ploieşti National Coal Company which was set up in 1957.
