= Shuichang mine =

Iron mine in Inner Mongolia, China

- Location: Inner Mongolia, China
- Products: Iron ore

The Shuichang mine is a large iron mine located in northern China in the Inner Mongolia. Shuichang represents one of the largest iron ore reserves in China and in the world having estimated reserves of 100 million tonnes of ore grading 35% iron metal.
