= Oryong mine =

Iron ore mine in North Hamgyong, North Korea

- Location: North Hamgyong Province, North Korea
- Products: Iron

The Oryong mine(오룡광산) is one of the largest iron mines in North Korea and in the world. The mine is located in the north of the country in North Hamgyong Province. The mine has estimated reserves of 1.73 billion tonnes of 28.5% iron ore. The annual mining production was 3,000 tons in 2007.
