= Yuzhno Khingan mine =

Iron mine in Russia

- Location: Sakha Republic, Russia
- Products: Iron ore

The Yuzhno Khingan mine is a large iron mine located in eastern Russia in the Sakha Republic. Yuzhno Khingan represents one of the largest iron ore reserves in Russia and in the world having estimated reserves of 3 billion tonnes of ore grading 38% iron metal.
