= Marampa mine =

Iron ore mine in Northern Province, Sierra Leone

- Location: Northern Province, Sierra Leone
- Products: Iron ore
- Opened: 2012

The Marampa mine is a large iron mine located in central Sierra Leone in the Northern Province. Marampa represents one of the largest iron ore reserves in Sierra Leone and in the world having estimated reserves of 1 billion tonnes of ore grading 32% iron metal.
