= Vasilievskoye mine =

Iron mine in Ukraine

- Location: Poltava Oblast, Ukraine
- Products: Iron ore

The Vasilievskoye mine is a large iron mine located in central Ukraine in the Poltava Oblast. Vasilievskoye represents one of the largest iron ore reserves in Ukraine and in the world having estimated reserves of 1.4 billion tonnes of ore grading 31% iron metal. The deposit sits immediately north of the Zarudenskoye mine, and immediately south of the Kharchenkovskoye mine.

As of 2022, the deposit is owned by Ferrexpo, but is not yet developed.
