= Berezovskoye mine =

Location
- Location: Zabaykalsky Krai, Russia

Production
- Products: Iron ore

The Berezovskoye mine is a large iron mine located in southern Russia in the Zabaykalsky Krai. Evrazruda represents one of the largest iron ore reserves in Russia and in the world having estimated reserves of 750 million tonnes of ore grading 40% iron metal.
