= Bakcharskoye mine =

Iron mine in Russia

- Interactive map of Bakcharskoye mine
- Location: Tomsk Oblast, Russia; 56°59′00″N 82°04′04″E
- Products: Iron ore

The Bakcharskoye mine is a large iron mine located in western Siberia in the Tomsk Oblast. Bakcharskoye represents one of the largest iron ore reserves in Russia and in the world having estimated reserves of 28 billion tonnes of ore grading 37.4% iron metal.
