= Tarynnakh mine =

Iron mine in Russia

- Location within Russia
- Location: Sakha Republic, Russia; 58°19′N 119°17′E
- Products: Iron ore

The Tarynnakh mine is a large iron mine located in eastern Russia in Olyokminsky District, Sakha Republic . Tarynnakh represents one of the largest iron ore reserves in Russia and in the world having estimated reserves of 2 billion tonnes of ore grading 28.1% iron metal.
