= Gorishne mine =

- Location: Poltava Oblast, Ukraine
- Products: Iron ore

The Gorishne-Plavninskoye Lavrikovskoye mine is a large iron mine located in central Ukraine in the Poltava Oblast. Gorishne represents one of the largest iron ore reserves in Ukraine and in the world having estimated reserves of 3.7 billion tonnes of ore grading 30% iron metal.
