= Kaouat mine =

Iron mine in Adrar, Mauritania

- Location: Adrar Region, Mauritania
- Products: Iron ore

The Kaouat mine is a large iron mine permit 3748 owned by (twinsminings.com) located in central Mauritania in the Adrar Region. Kaouat represents one of the largest iron ore reserves in Mauritania and in the world having estimated reserves of 3.2 billion tonnes of ore grading 44% iron metal.
