= Attepe mine =

Iron mine in Turkey

- Location: Niğde, Niğde Province, Turkey
- Products: Iron
- Opened: 1960
- Company: Etibank

The Attepe mine is a large mine in the south of Turkey in Niğde Province 269 kilometres (167 mi) south of the capital, Ankara. Attepe represents the largest iron reserve in Turkey, having estimated reserves of 70 million tonnes of ore grading 40% iron. The 70 million tonnes of ore contains 28 million tonnes of iron metal.
