= Olimpiyskoye mine =

Iron mine in Russia

- Location: Sakha Republic, Russia
- Products: Iron ore

The Olimpiyskoye mine is a large iron mine located in eastern Russia in the Sakha Republic. Olimpiyskoye represents one of the largest iron ore reserves in Russia and in the world having estimated reserves of 900 million tonnes of ore grading 28% iron metal.
