= Manuilovskoye mine =

Iron mine in Ukraine

- Location: Poltava Oblast, Ukraine
- Products: Iron ore

The Manuilovskoye mine is a large iron mine located in central Ukraine in the Poltava Oblast. Manuilovskoye represents one of the largest iron ore reserves in Ukraine and in the world. It is estimated that it has reserves of 3.5 billion tonnes of ore grading 30% iron metal. The mine sits immediately north of the Kharchenkovskoye mine and immediately south of the Brovarkovskoye mine.

As of 2022, the deposit is owned by Ferrexpo, but is not yet developed.
