= Mwanesi mine =

Iron mine in Zimbabwe

- Location: Midlands Province, Zimbabwe
- Products: Iron ore
- Opened: 2014

The Mwanesi mine is a large iron mine located in central Zimbabwe in the Midlands Province. Mwanesi represents one of the largest iron ore reserves in Zimbabwe and in the world having estimated reserves of 30 billion tonnes of ore grading 43% iron metal.
