= Divriği B-Kafa mine =

Iron mine in Turkey

- Location: Divriği, Sivas Province, Turkey
- Products: Iron
- Opened: 1935
- Company: Etibank

The Divriği B-Kafa mine is a large mine in the east of Turkey in Sivas Province 245 km east of the capital, Ankara. Divriği B-Kafa represents the largest iron reserve in Turkey having estimated reserves of 50 million tonnes of ore grading 55% iron. The 50 million tonnes of ore contains 27.5 million tonnes of iron metal.
