= Prioskolsky mine =

Iron mine in Russia

- Location: Belgorod Oblast, Russia
- Products: Iron ore

The Prioskolsky mine is a large iron mine located in western Russia in the Belgorod Oblast. Prioskolsky represents one of the largest iron ore reserves in Russia, and in the world having estimated reserves of 2.1 billion tonnes of ore grading 38% iron metal.
