= Prigoria Coal Mine =

Coal mine in Gorj County, Romania

Prigoria Coal mine
- Location: Prigoria, Gorj County, Romania
- Products: Coal
- Production: 1,000,000 tonnes
- Financial year: 2008
- Opened: 1984
- Company: CEN Craiova

Prigoria Coal Mine is an open-pit mining exploitation, one of the largest in Romania located in Prigoria, Gorj County. The legal entity managing the Prigoria mine is the CEN Craiova which was set up in 2004.
