= Teiskoye mine =

Iron mine in Russia

- Location within Russia
- Location: Sakha Republic, Russia; 53°10′N 89°20′E
- Products: Iron ore

The Teiskoye mine is a large iron mine located in eastern Russia in Askizsky District, Khakassia. Teiskoye represents one of the largest iron ore reserves in Russia and in the world, having estimated reserves of 136.4 million tonnes of ore grading 29.9% iron metal.
