= Cassinga mine =

Iron mine in Huila, Angola

Location
- Location: Huíla Province, Angola

Production
- Products: Iron ore

History
- Opened: 2013

The Cassinga mine is a large iron mine located in south-western Angola in Huíla Province. Cassinga represents one of the largest iron ore reserves in Angola and in the world having estimated reserves of 1 billion tonnes of ore grading 30% iron metal.
