= Sheps-Perault Lake mine =

Iron mine in Canada

- Location: Quebec, Canada
- Products: Iron ore

The Sheps-Perault Lake mine is a large iron mine located in east Canada in Quebec. Sheps-Perault Lake represents one of the largest iron ore reserves in Canada and in the world having estimated reserves of 4.38 billion tonnes of ore grading 30.5% iron metal.
