= Kavakta mine =

Iron mine in Russia

- Location: Sakha Republic, Russia
- Products: Iron ore

The Kavakta mine is a large iron mine located in eastern Russia in the Sakha Republic. Kavakta represents one of the largest iron ore reserves in Russia and in the world having estimated reserves of 5 billion tonnes of ore grading 15% iron metal.
