= Zarudenskoye mine =

Iron mine in Ukraine

- Location: Poltava Oblast, Ukraine
- Products: Iron ore

The Zarudenskoye mine is a large iron mine located in central Ukraine in the Poltava Oblast. Zarudenskoye represents one of the largest iron ore reserves in Ukraine and in the world having estimated reserves of 1.5 billion tonnes of ore grading 31% iron metal. The deposit sits immediately north of the operational Belanovskoye mine, and immediately south of the undeveloped Vasilievskoye mine.

As of 2022, the deposit is owned by Ferrexpo, but is not yet developed.
