= Dyosovskoye mine =

Iron mine in Russia

- Location: Sakha Republic, Russia
- Products: Iron ore

The Dyosovskoye mine is a large iron mine located in eastern Russia in the Sakha Republic. Dyosovskoye represents one of the largest iron ore reserves in Russia and in the world having estimated reserves of 700 million tonnes of ore grading 66.7% iron metal.
