= Itmatinskoye mine =

Iron mine in Russia

- Location: Far Eastern Federal District, Russia
- Products: Iron ore

The Itmatinskoye mine is a large iron mine located in eastern Russia in the Far Eastern Federal District. Itmatinskoye represents one of the largest iron ore reserves in Russia and in the world having estimated reserves of 3.7 billion tonnes of ore grading 41.6% iron metal.
