= Quý Xa iron mine =

Iron ore mine in Lào Cai, Vietnam

Qui Xa mine
- Location: Lào Cai Province, Vietnam
- Products: Iron ore

The Qui Xa mine is a large iron mine located in northern Vietnam in the Lào Cai Province. Qui Xa represents one of the largest iron ore reserves in Vietnam and in the world having estimated reserves of 118 million tonnes of ore grading 55% iron metal.
