= Țebea Coal Mine =

Coal mine in Hunedoara County, Romania

Țebea Coal mine
- Location: Baia de Criş, Hunedoara County, Romania
- Products: Coal
- Production: 203,400 tonnes
- Financial year: 2008
- Opened: 1980
- Company: National Hard Coal Company

Țebea Coal Mine is an underground mining exploitation, one of the largest in Romania located in Baia de Criş, Hunedoara County. The legal entity managing the Țebea mine is the National Hard Coal Company, which was set up in 1998. The mine has reserves of 14.7 million tonnes of coal.

== See also ==
- Jiu Valley
- League of Miners Unions of the Jiu Valley
