= Torre de Moncorvo mines =

Iron mines in Torre de Moncorvo, Portugal

- Location within Portugal
- Location: Bragança District,Portugal; 41.185372°N 6.989021°W
- Products: Iron ore

The Torre de Moncorvo mines are a group of iron ore mines located in Torre de Moncorvo, Bragança in northeastern Portugal. Their deposits are among the largest in Europe, with estimated reserves of 2.56 billion tonnes of ore grading 37% iron metal.

They have been exploited at a small scale since the Iron Age by local communities. Over time, the mines developed through proto-industrial operations in the 18th and 19th centuries and became a major industrial site in the 20th century, employing up to 1,500 miners in the 1950s. Modern attempts to reactivate mining operations by Aethel Mining, were initiated in the 2020s but were halted by the Portuguese government in 2025, over lack of activity and contractual non-compliance.

== History ==
Iron mining in the Torre de Moncorvo region began during the Iron Age, when deposits near Serra do Reboredo and Mua were exploited to supply nearby communities. For centuries, the ore was collected directly from the surface, as it occurred naturally in accessible areas. Settlements such as Vale de Ferreiros, Felgal, Felgueiras, and Escoural developed around these deposits, relying on iron production to support agriculture, crafts, and daily life. Primitive exploitation of these deposits was carried out until the end of the 18th century.

The first experience of proto-industrial exploration took place in the 1790s and, from the 1870s on, interest in mining concessions in Moncorvo was renewed, with 35 concessions. In 1897 most of the concessions were acquired by the Syndicat Franco-Iberique Company, which began "methodical and systematic prospecting work with 1396 chemical analyses".

Between 1930 and 1934, galleries were opened in Mua, and 15,279 tons of ore were extracted, according to the Minas Bulletin. The exploration and exploration work of the Companhia Mineira de Moncorvo continued until 1942. After World War II the concessions of this German company were made by the Portuguese Government and, from 1957, that Company was managed by Exploration & Bergba of the Thyssen group, assuming the designation of Minacorvo, Lda.

That year the pilot wash was built and, in 1976, Minacorvo was dissolved and its concessions were integrated into Ferrominas SARL, then Ferrominas EP, ending with the creation of EDM EP, from 1986.

Between 1951 and 1976, a total of 1,796,535 tonnes of iron ore were exported from Moncorvo.

Torre de Moncorvo iron mines were the largest employer in the region in the 1950s, employing 1,500 miners.

=== Reactivation attempt ===
In 2016, MTI – Ferro de Moncorvo received a concession to explore a deposit in Cabeço da Mua. In 2020, this was purchased by Aethel Mining, with plans for a €550 million investment over 60 years. The company began extraction in October 2021, producing around 2,000 tonnes of certified high-density iron ore per day. However, the concession was revoked by the Portuguese government in April 2025 due to lack of operational activity and non-compliance with legal and contractual obligations.

As of August 2025, no other companies had expressed interest in taking over the concession. The government announced a review of the technical, financial, and environmental rules governing future tenders, including revised royalty conditions and community participation measures, before considering new bids for the mines' reactivation.

== Iron ore deposits ==
The Torre de Moncorvo iron ore deposits, of Ordovician age, are divided into four main areas located to the east of the town: Serra de Reboredo, Pedrada, Carvalhosa, and Cabeço da Mua, the latter situated further north. These deposits were shaped by the first and second phases of the Hercynian orogeny, which produced the fracture systems and displacements observed in the region, along with later tectonic structures. The ore exhibits a schistose and granular texture and is primarily composed of hematite, distributed as approximately 23% specular hematite, 7% martitic hematite, and 70% martitic-specular hematite, with minor amounts of magnetite and rare supergene limonite. The gangue consists mainly of quartz, sericite, chlorite, albite, and apatite.

The Moncorvo iron ore deposits are considered to be one of the largest in Europe, having estimated reserves of 2.56 billion tonnes of ore grading 37% iron metal.
