= Sobstvenno-Kachkanarskoye mine =

Mine in Russia

- Location: Sverdlovsk Oblast, Russia
- Products: Iron ore

The Sobstvenno-Kachkanarskoye mine is a large iron mine located in western Russia in the Sverdlovsk Oblast. Sobstvenno-Kachkanarskoye represents one of the largest iron ore reserves in Russia and in the world, having estimated reserves of 3.28 billion tonnes of ore grading 16.6% iron metal.
