= Putu mine =

Iron ore mine in Grand Gedeh County, Liberia

- Location: Grand Gedeh County, Liberia
- Products: Iron ore
- Opened: 2010

The Putu mine is a large iron mine located in south-east Liberia in Grand Gedeh County. Putu represents one of the largest iron ore reserves in Liberia and in the world having estimated reserves of 2.37 billion tonnes of ore grading 34.1% iron metal.
