= Benxi mine =

Iron mine in Liaoning, China

- Location: Liaoning, China
- Products: Iron ore
- Opened: 2010

The Benxi mine is a large iron mine located in north-eastern China in the Liaoning. Benxi represents one of the largest iron ore reserves in China and in the world having estimated reserves of 3 billion tonnes of ore grading 43.5% iron metal.
