= Shymanivske mine =

- Location: Dnipropetrovsk Oblast, Ukraine
- Products: Iron ore
- Opened: 2012

The Shymanivske mine is a large iron mine located in central Ukraine in the Dnipropetrovsk Oblast. Shymanivske represents one of the largest iron ore reserves in Ukraine and in the world having estimated reserves of 834 million tonnes of ore grading 32% iron metal.
