= Chara mine =

Iron mine in Russia

- Location: Zabaykalsky Krai, Russia
- Products: Iron ore

The Chara mine is a large iron mine located in southern Russia in the Zabaykalsky Krai. Chara represents one of the largest iron ore reserves in Russia and in the world having estimated reserves of 8 billion tonnes of ore grading 30% iron metal.
