= Timir mine =

Iron mine in Russia

- Location: Sakha Republic, Russia
- Products: Iron ore

The Timir mine is a large iron mine located in eastern Russia in the Sakha Republic. Timir represents one of the largest iron ore reserves in Russia and in the world having estimated reserves of 4.8 billion tonnes of ore grading 45% iron metal.
