= Kesikköprü mine =

Iron mine in Turkey

- Location: Kırşehir, Kırşehir Province, Turkey
- Products: Iron
- Opened: 1955
- Company: Etibank

The Kesikköprü mine is a large mine in the centre of Turkey in Kırşehir Province 12 km south of the capital, Ankara. Kesikköprü represents the largest iron reserve in Turkey having estimated reserves of 13.6 million tonnes of ore grading 54% iron. The 13.6 million tonnes of ore contains 7.34 million tonnes of iron metal.
