= Sheregesh mine =

Iron mine in Russia

- Location within Russia
- Location: Kemerovo Oblast, Russia; 52°33′N 87°34′E
- Products: Iron ore

The Sheregesh mine is a large iron mine located in Tashtagolsky District, Kemerovo Oblast, Russian. Sheregesh represents one of the largest iron ore reserves in Russia and in the world, having estimated reserves of 184.7 million tonnes of ore grading 35.8% iron content.
