= Alegria mine =

Iron mine in Brazil

Coordinates: 20.1599°S 43.4913°W

- Interactive map of Alegria mine
- Location: Minas Gerais, Brazil
- Products: Iron ore
- Opened: 1992

The Alegria mine is a large iron mine located in southeast Brazil in Minas Gerais. Alegria represents one of the largest iron ore reserves in Brazil and in the world having estimated reserves of 1.24 billion tonnes of ore grading 42.2% iron metal.
