= Enashiminskoye mine =

Iron mine in Russia

- Location: Sakha Republic, Russia
- Products: Iron ore

The Enashiminskoye mine is a large iron mine located in eastern Russia in the Sakha Republic. Enashiminskoye represents one of the largest iron ore reserves in Russia and in the world having estimated reserves of 450 million tonnes of ore grading 51% iron metal.
