= Yakovlevsky mine =

- Location: Belgorod Oblast, Russia
- Products: Iron ore

The Yakovlevsky mine is a large iron mine located in western Russia in the Belgorod Oblast. Yakovlevsky represents one of the largest iron ore reserves in Russia and in the world having estimated reserves of 9.6 billion tonnes of ore grading 61.7% iron metal.
