= Agbaja mine =

Iron mine in Kogi State, Nigeria

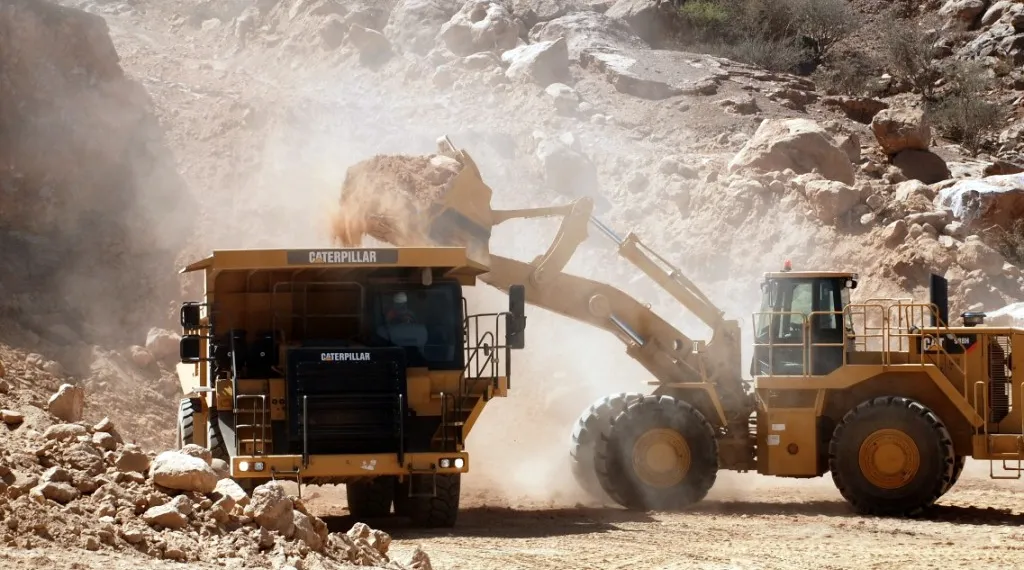

Location
- Location: Kogi State, Nigeria

Production
- Products: Iron ore

History
- Opened: 2012

Owner
- Company: KCM Mining

The Agbaja mine is a large iron mine located in central Nigeria in the Kogi State. Agbaja represents one of the largest iron ore reserves in Nigeria and in the world having estimated reserves of 1.25 billion tonnes of ore grading 48% iron metal.
