= Baizhiyan mine =

Iron mine in Inner Mongolia, China

- Location: Inner Mongolia, China
- Products: Iron ore

The Baizhiyan mine is a large iron mine located in Inner Mongolia in northern China. Baizhiyan represents one of the largest iron ore reserves in China and in the world, having estimated reserves of 179.7 million tonnes of ore grading 33.3% iron metal.
