= Sijiaying mine =

Iron mine in Inner Mongolia, China

- Location: Inner Mongolia, China
- Products: Iron ore

The Sijiaying mine is a large iron mine located in northern China in the Inner Mongolia. Sijiaying represents one of the largest iron ore reserves in China and in the world having estimated reserves of 2.2 billion tonnes of ore grading 30% iron metal.
