= Brovarkovskoye mine =

Iron mine in Ukraine

- Location: Poltava Oblast, Ukraine
- Products: Iron ore

The Brovarkovskoye mine is a large iron mine located in central Ukraine in the Poltava Oblast. Brovarkovskoye represents one of the largest iron ore reserves in Ukraine and in the world having estimated reserves of 4 billion tonnes of ore grading 30% iron metal. The mine sits immediately north of the Manuilovskoye mine.

As of 2022, the deposit is owned by Ferrexpo, but is not yet developed.
