= Tadong mine =

Iron mine in China

- Location: China
- Products: Iron ore

The Tadong mine is a large iron mine located in northern China. Tadong represents one of the largest iron ore reserves in China and in the world having estimated reserves of 177 million tonnes of ore grading 25.2% iron metal.
