= Howells Lake-Howells River North mine =

Iron mine in Newfoundland and Labrador, Canada

- Location: Newfoundland and Labrador, Canada
- Products: Iron ore

The Howells Lake-Howells River North mine is a large iron mine located in east Canada in Newfoundland and Labrador. Howells Lake-Howells River North represents one of the largest iron ore reserves in Canada and in the world having estimated reserves of 11.74 billion tonnes of ore grading 22% iron metal.
