= Tyya mine =

Iron mine in Russia

- Location: Buryatia, Russia
- Products: Iron ore

The Tyya mine is a large iron mine located in southern Russia in the Buryatia. Tyya represents one of the largest iron ore reserves in Russia and in the world having estimated reserves of 1.5 billion tonnes of ore grading 40% iron metal.
