= Abakanskoye mine =

Iron mine in Russia

- Location: Sakha Republic, Russia
- Products: Iron ore

The Abakanskoye mine is a large iron mine located in eastern Russia in the Sakha Republic. Abakanskoye represents one of the largest iron ore reserves in Russia and in the world having estimated reserves of 172.5 million tonnes of ore grading 38% iron metal.
