= Okolovskoye deposit =

Iron ore mine in Gomel, Belarus

- Location: Gomel Region, Belarus

The Okolovskoye deposit is a large deposit in the south of Belarus in Gomel Region. Okolovskoye represents one of the largest iron reserve in Belarus having estimated reserves of 1 billion tonnes of ore grading 26% iron.

As of 2025, it remained unmined.
