= Pangjiapu mine =

Iron mine in China

- Location: China
- Products: Iron ore

The Pangjiapu mine is a large iron mine located in northern China. Pangjiapu represents one of the largest iron ore reserves in China and in the world having estimated reserves of 100 million tonnes of ore grading 45% iron metal.
