= Cacova Ierii mine =

Iron mine in Romania

- Location: Băișoara, Cluj County, Romania
- Products: Iron ore
- Production: 415,000 tonnes of iron ore

The Cacova Ierii mine is a large open pit mine in the north-western of Romania in Cluj County. Cacova Ierii represents one of the largest iron ore reserves in Romania having estimated reserves of 16.6 million tonnes of ore grading 42% iron metal. The mine has the capability to produce around 415,000 tonnes of iron ore/year.
