= Turukhanskoye mine =

Iron mine in Russia

- Location within Russia
- Location: Krasnoyarsk Krai, Russia; 65°51′N 86°26′E
- Products: Iron ore

The Turukhanskoye mine is a large iron mine located in central Russia in Turukhansky District, Krasnoyarsk Krai. Turukhanskoye represents one of the largest iron ore reserves in Russia and in the world having estimated reserves of 3 billion tonnes of ore grading 30.3% iron metal.
