= Lac Ritchie mine =

Iron mine in Quebec, Canada

- Location: Quebec, Canada
- Products: Iron ore

The Lac Ritchie mine is a large iron mine located in east Canada in Quebec. LabMag represents one of the largest iron ore reserves in Canada and in the world having estimated reserves of 4.77 billion tonnes of ore grading 30.5% iron metal.

== See also ==
- List of mines in Canada
