= Kharchenkovskoye mine =

Iron mine in Ukraine

- Location: Poltava Oblast, Ukraine
- Products: Iron ore

The Kharchenkovskoye mine is a large iron mine located in central Ukraine in the Poltava Oblast. Kharchenkovskoye represents one of the largest iron ore reserves in Ukraine and in the world having estimated reserves of 2.8 billion tonnes of ore grading 30% iron metal. The mine sits immediately north of Vasilievskoye mine and immediately south of Manuilovskoye mine.

As of 2022, the deposit is owned by Ferrexpo, but is not yet developed.
