= Wuenduermiao mine =

Chinese iron mine

- Location: China
- Products: Iron ore

The Wuenduermiao mine is a large iron mine located in northern China. Wuenduermiao represents one of the largest iron ore reserves in China and in the world having estimated reserves of 120 million tonnes of ore grading 36% iron metal.
