= Ingulets mine =

Iron mine in Ukraine

- Location: Dnipropetrovsk Oblast, Ukraine
- Products: Iron ore
- Opened: 2012
- Company: Metinvest

The Ingulets mine is a large iron mine located in central Ukraine in the Dnipropetrovsk Oblast. Ingulets represents one of the largest iron ore reserves in Ukraine and in the world, having estimated reserves of 937 million tonnes of ore grading 63.5% iron metal.
