= Tonkolili mine =

Iron ore mine in Northern Province, Sierra Leone

- Location: Northern Province, Sierra Leone
- Products: Iron ore
- Opened: 2013

The Tonkolili mine is a large iron mine located in central Sierra Leone in the Northern Province. Tonkolili represents one of the largest iron ore reserves in Sierra Leone and in the world having estimated reserves of 12.8 billion tonnes of ore grading 64% iron metal.
