= Sanheming mine =

- Location within China
- Location: China; 41°21′N 111°0′E
- Products: Iron ore
Closed
Sanheming mine
- Interactive map of Sanheming mine
- Ghulam Haider (November 15, 2015). "Sanheming Mine" (bbs). Google Maps.

The Sanheming mine is a large iron mine located in Inner Mongolia in China. Sanheming represents an estimated reserve of 167 million tonnes of ore, grading 34.8% iron metal.
