= Baoguosi mine =

Iron mine in Inner Mongolia, China

- Location: Inner Mongolia, China
- Products: Iron ore

The Baoguosi mine is a large iron mine located in northern China in the Inner Mongolia. Baoguosi represents one of the largest iron ore reserves in China and in the world having estimated reserves of 107.9 million tonnes of ore grading 33.7% iron metal.
