= Lac Otelnuk mine =

Iron ore mine in Quebec, Canada

Coordinates: 55°58′N 68°17′W

- Interactive map of Lac Otelnuk mine
- Location: Quebec, Canada
- Products: Iron ore

Lac Otelnuk mine is the largest iron mine project in Quebec, Canada, with NI 43–101 compliant estimated reserves of 23.74 billion tonnes of ore grading 29.65% iron. In 2005, Bedford Resource Partners staked 129 claims over the deposit and optioned it to Adriana Resources. In 2012, 60% ownership of the iron deposit was sold to Wuhan Iron and Steel Corporation (WISCO). Over $150 million have been invested in the exploration, studies, the 2015 NI 43-101 compliant feasibility study, and the formation of the Lac Otelnuk Mining Company, a joint venture between Adriana Resources Inc and WISCO.

In 2017, Baosteel merged with WISCO and Adriana Resources merged with Sprott Holdings.

== See also ==
- List of mines in Canada
