= Belokitatskoye mine =

Location
- Location: Sakha Republic, Russia

Production
- Products: Iron ore

The Belokitatskoye mine is a large iron mine located in eastern Russia in the Sakha Republic. Belokitatskoye represents one of the largest iron ore reserves in Russia and in the world having estimated reserves of 200 million tonnes of ore grading 88.6% iron metal.
