= Yuanjiachun mine =

Iron mine in China

- Location: China
- Products: Iron ore

The Yuanjiachun mine is a large iron mine located in northern China. Yuanjiachun represents one of the largest iron ore reserves in China and in the world having estimated reserves of 895 million tonnes of ore grading 32.7% iron metal.
