= Gongchangling mine =

Iron mine in Inner Mongolia, China

- Location: Inner Mongolia, China
- Products: Iron ore

The Gongchangling mine is a large iron mine located in northern China in the Inner Mongolia. Gongchangling represents one of the largest iron ore reserves in China and in the world having estimated reserves of 760 million tonnes of ore grading 32.8% iron metal.
