= Avnik mine =

Iron mine in Turkey

- Location within Turkey
- Location: Bingöl, Bingöl Province, Turkey; 38°39′0″N 40°19′59.02″E
- Products: Iron
- Opened: 1973
- Company: Etibank

The Avnik mine is a large iron ore mine in Bingöl Province, eastern Turkey, 728 km (452 mi) east of the capital, Ankara.

Avnik represents the largest iron reserve in Turkey having estimated reserves of 104 million tonnes of ore grading 42% iron. The 104 million tonnes of ore contains 43.7 million tonnes of iron metal.
