= Sărmășag =

Sărmășag Sarmaság
- Commune
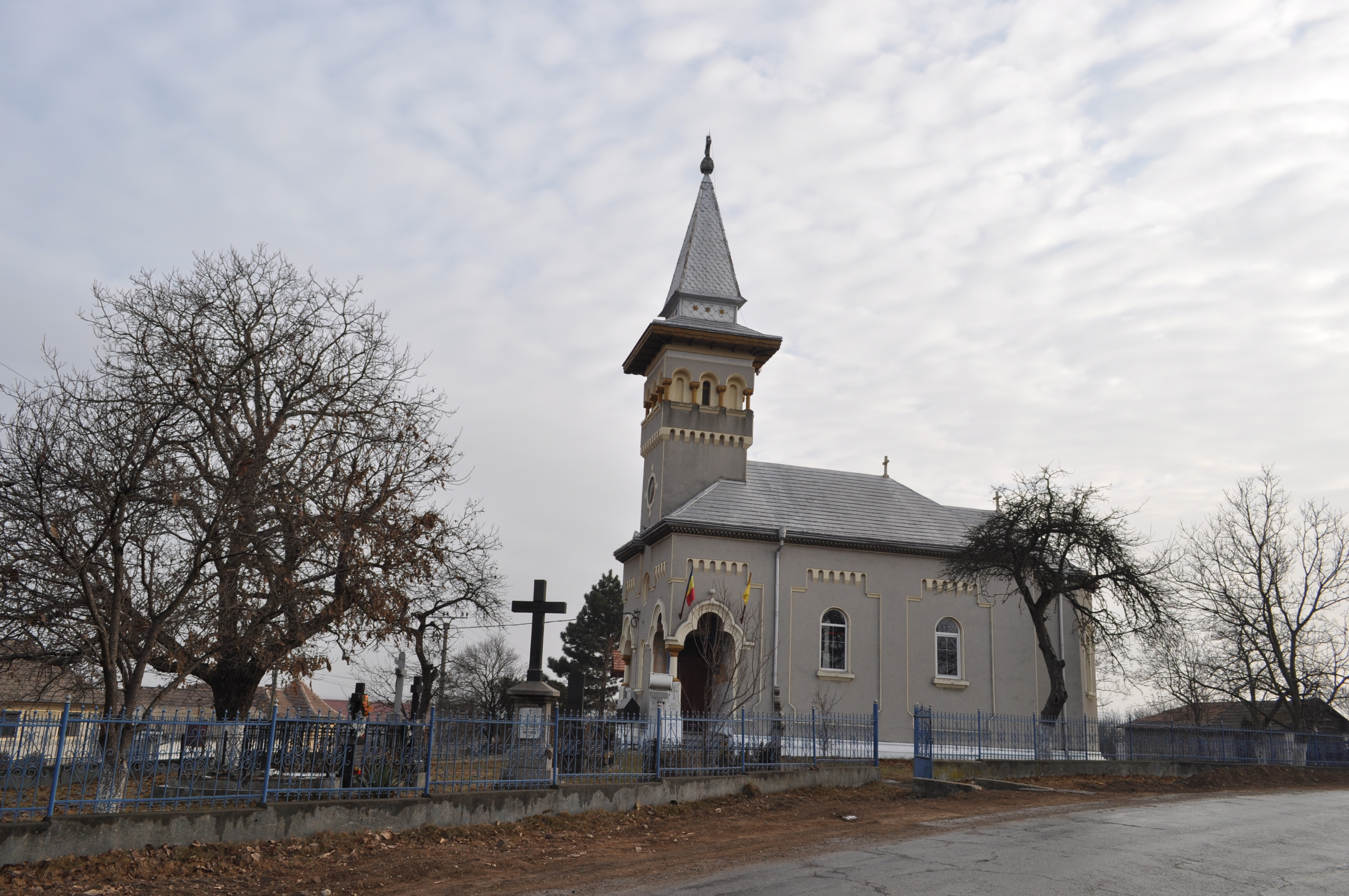
- St. Nicholas Church in Moiad

- Coat of arms

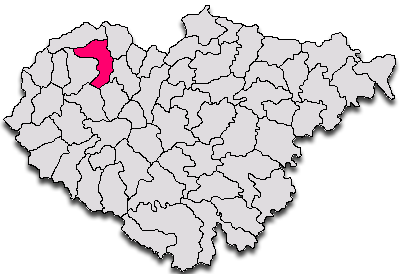
- Location in Sălaj County

- Location in Romania
- Coordinates: 47°20′55″N 22°49′40″E
- Country: Romania
- County: Sălaj

Government
  - Mayor (2020–2024): Attila-János Dombi (UDMR)
- Area: 58.62 km^{2} (22.63 sq mi)
- Elevation: 189 m (620 ft)
- Population (2021-12-01): 4,772
  - Density: 81.41/km^{2} (210.8/sq mi)
- Time zone: UTC+02:00 (EET)
  - Summer (DST): UTC+03:00 (EEST)
- Postal code: 457330
- Area code: +(40) 0260
- Vehicle reg.: SJ
- Website: www.sarmasag.ro

Sărmășag (Romanian: Sărmășag; Hungarian: Sarmaság) is a commune in Sălaj County, Crișana, Romania. It is composed of six villages: Ilișua (Selymesilosva), Lompirt (Szilágylompért), Moiad (Mojád), Poiana Măgura (Magurahegy), Sărmășag, and Țărmure (Parttanya).

== Geography and climate ==
The commune is located in the northwestern part of Sălaj County, 28 km (17 mi) from the county seat, Zalău, at an altitude between 160 m (520 ft) and 379 m (1,243 ft). The climate is continental, the average temperature in January is -3 °C, in July 21.1 °C. The average annual precipitation is about 627 mm (24.7 in). The most important fossil fuel in the area is coal.

== History ==
Sărmășag was already inhabited in the Iron Age. The first written documents date back to 1355. The name of the locality probably comes from László Sarmassághy who received the town from the Báthory family.

== Demographics ==
As of the census of 2002 there were 6,547 people residing in the commune. The ethnic makeup of the commune was 5,168 Hungarians, 1,156 Romanians, 217 Roma, 4 Ukrainians, and one German. Religious beliefs:

- Reformed – 4,635
- Romanian Orthodox – 1,164
- Roman Catholic – 426
- Baptist – 232
- Greek Catholic – 25
- Pentecostal – 13
- Evangelical – 2

At the 2021 census, Sărmășag had a population of 4,772; of those, 57,75% were Hungarians, 35.94% Romanians, and 3.73% Roma.

== Sights ==
- Reformed church in Lompirt (built in the 18th century)
- Reformed church in Ilișua (built in the 15th century)
- Reformed church in Sărmășag (built 1806j
- St. Nicholas Church in Moiad (c. 1936)

== Sister cities ==
- Soltvadkert, Hungary

== See also ==
- Sărmășag Coal Mine
