= Milkanskoye mine =

Iron mine in Russia

- Location: Far Eastern Federal District, Russia
- Products: Iron ore

The Milkanskoye mine is a large iron mine located in eastern Russia in the Far Eastern Federal District. Milkanskoye represents one of the largest iron ore reserves in Russia and in the world having estimated reserves of 2.7 billion tonnes of ore grading 31.5% iron metal.
