= Gornaya Shoriya mine =

- Location: Kemerovo Oblast, Russia
- Products: Iron ore

The Gornaya Shoriya mine is a large iron mine located in central-southern Russia in the Kemerovo Oblast. It represents one of the largest iron ore reserves in Russia and in the world having estimated reserves of 2.17 billion tonnes of ore grading 34% iron metal.
