= Berezov mine =

Location
- Location: Amur Oblast, Russia

Production
- Products: Iron ore

The Berezov mine is a large iron mine located in eastern Russia in the Amur Oblast. Berezov represents one of the largest iron ore reserves in Russia and in the world having estimated reserves of 1 billion tonnes of ore grading 55% iron metal.
