= Karasugskoye mine =

- Location: Siberia, Russia
- Products: Iron ore

The Karasugskoye mine is a large iron mine located in eastern Russia in Siberia. Karasugskoye represents one of the largest iron ore reserves in Russia and in the world having estimated reserves of 270 million tonnes of ore grading 25.8% iron metal.
