= Zhalanzhangzhi mine =

Iron mine in China

- Location: China
- Products: Iron ore

The Zhalanzhangzhi mine is a large iron mine located in central China. Zhalanzhangzhi represents one of the largest iron ore reserves in China and in the world having estimated reserves of 200 million tonnes of ore grading 45% iron metal.
