= Kaputan =

Village in Kotayk, Armenia

Kaputan Կապուտան
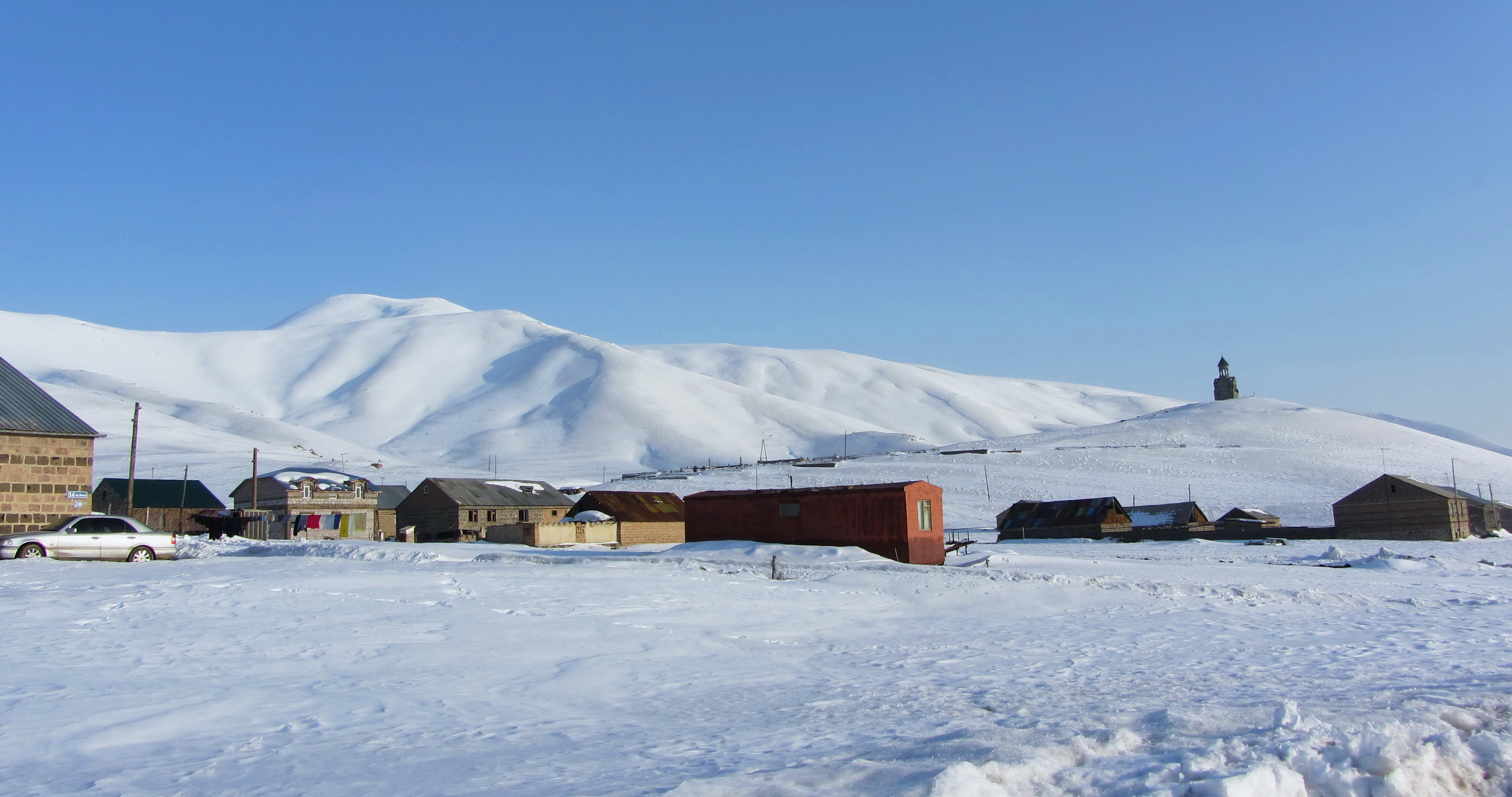
- Kaputan Village, Kaptavank Church, and Mount Hatis

- Location within Armenia
- Coordinates: 40°19′28″N 44°41′38″E
- Country: Armenia
- Marz (Province): Kotayk

Population (2011)
  - Total: 1,210
- Time zone: UTC+4 ( )

Kaputan (Armenian: Կապուտան), is a village in the Kotayk Province of Armenia.

== Gallery ==
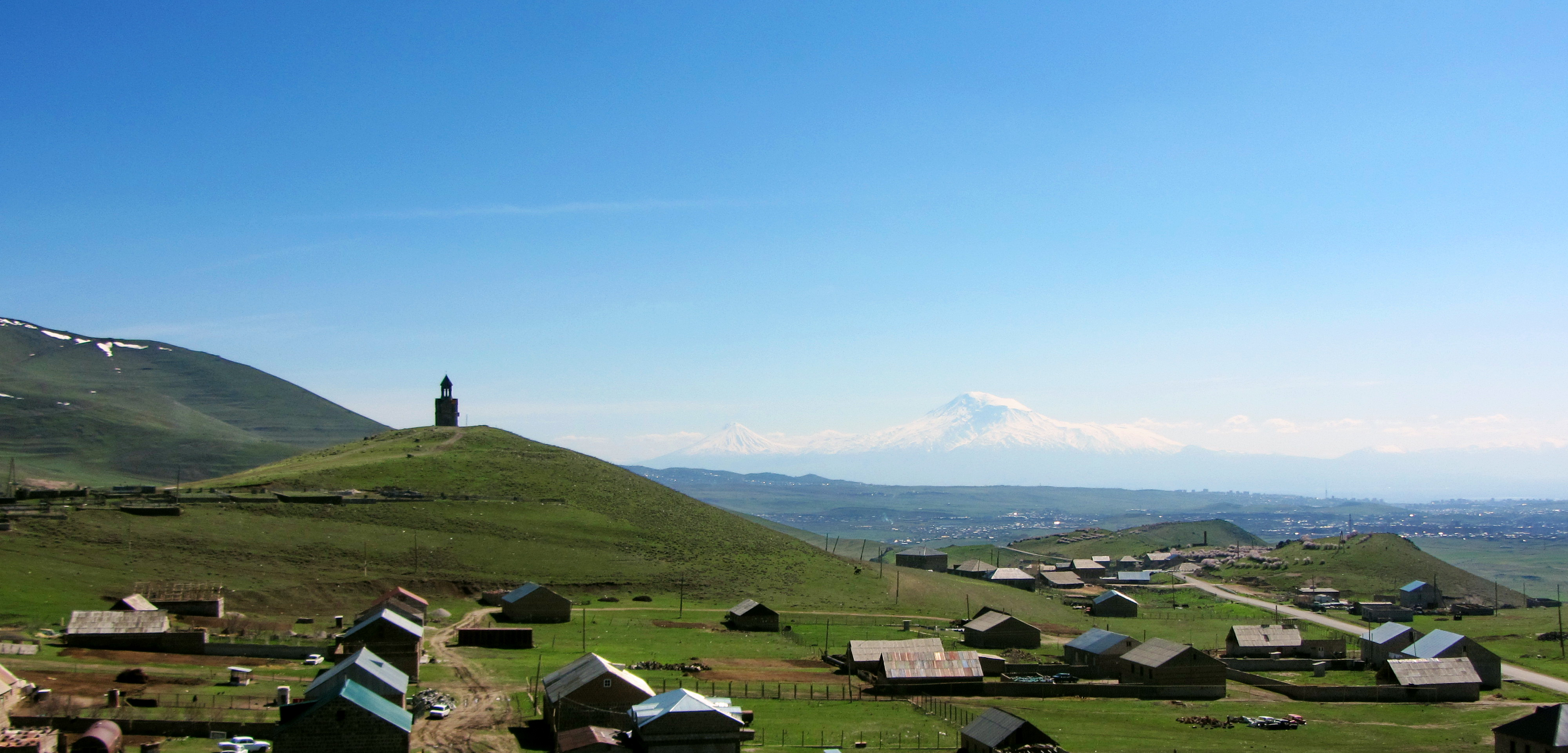
Kaputan village

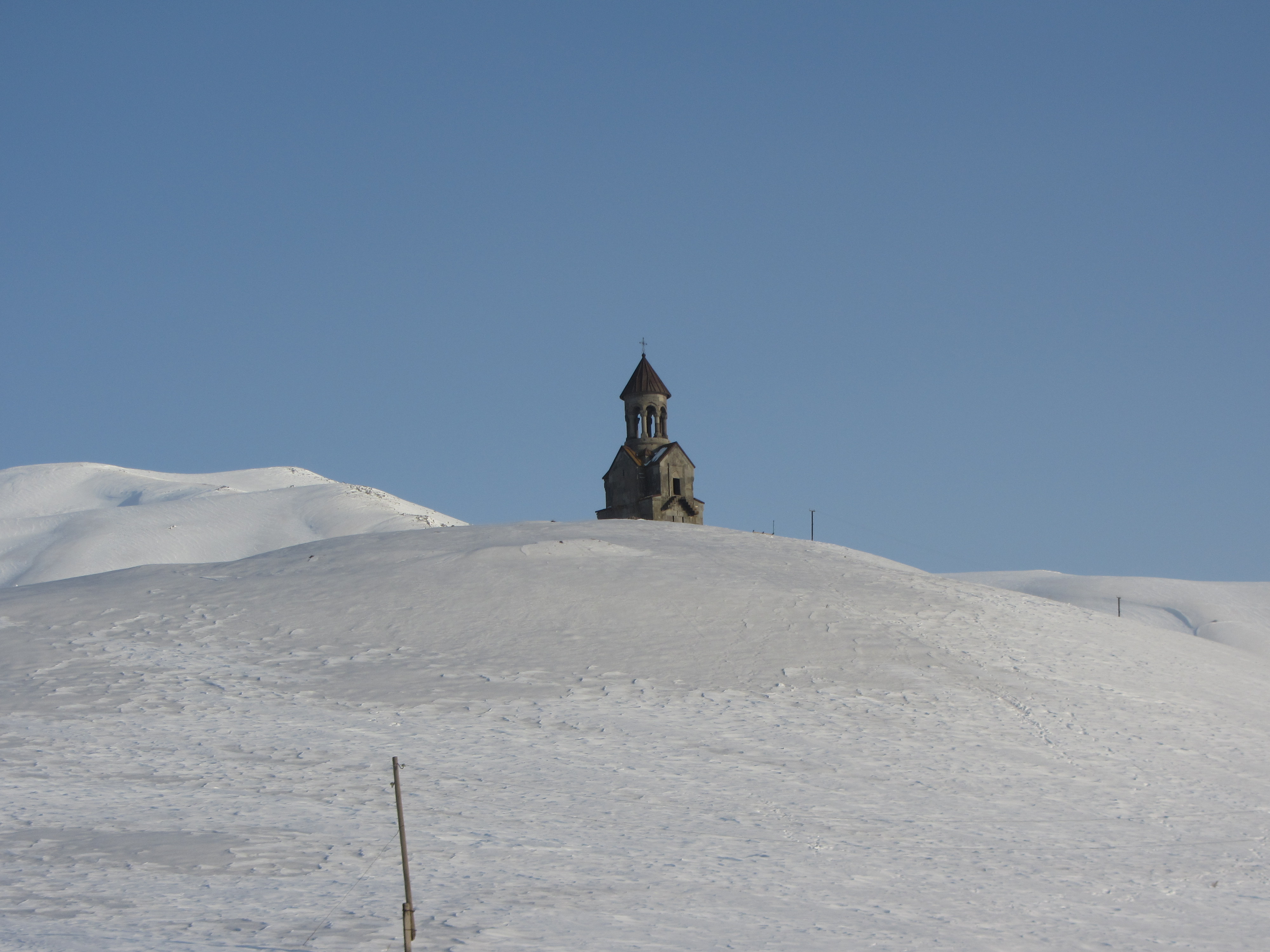
Kaptavank Church

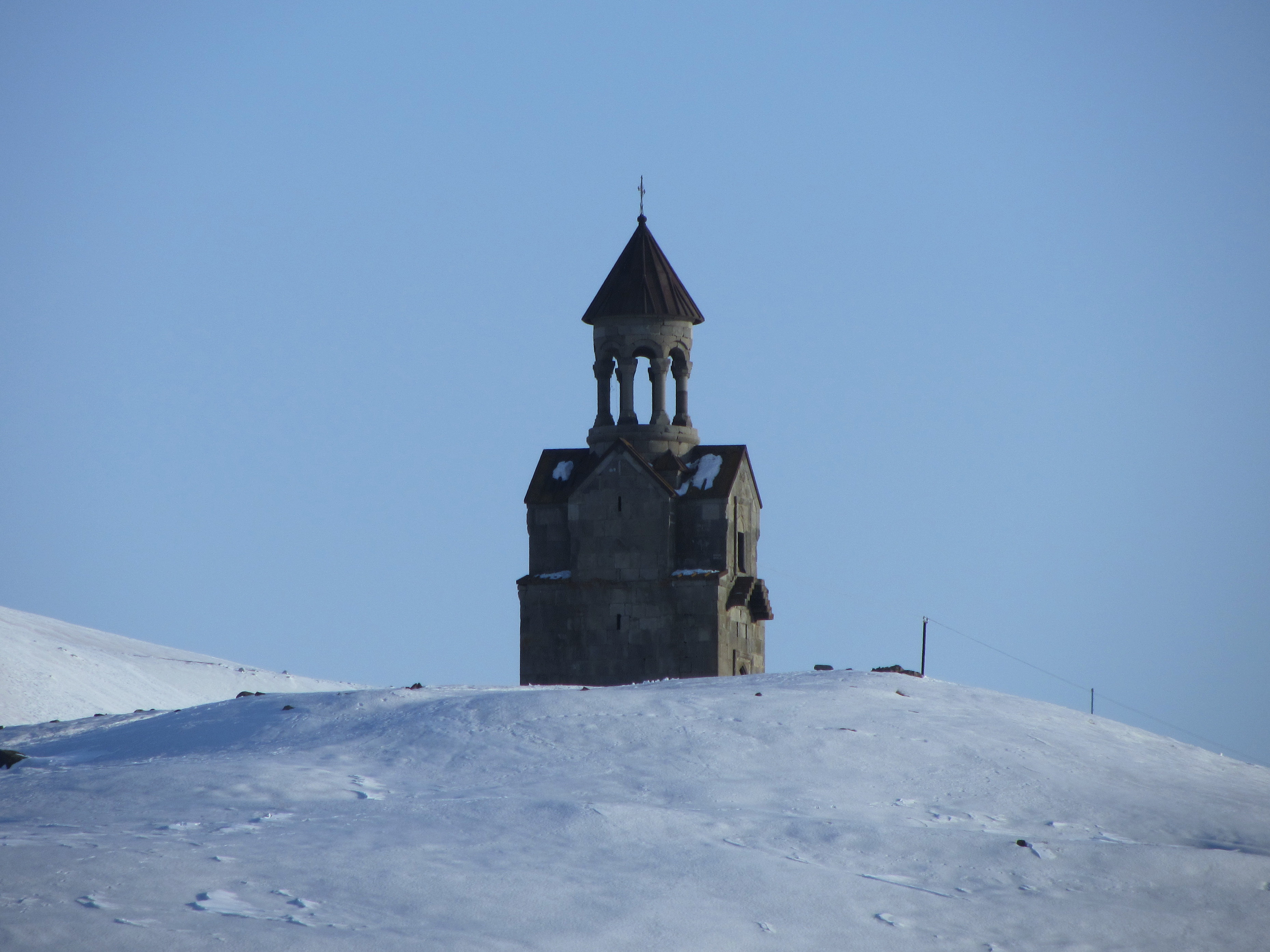
Kaptavank Church

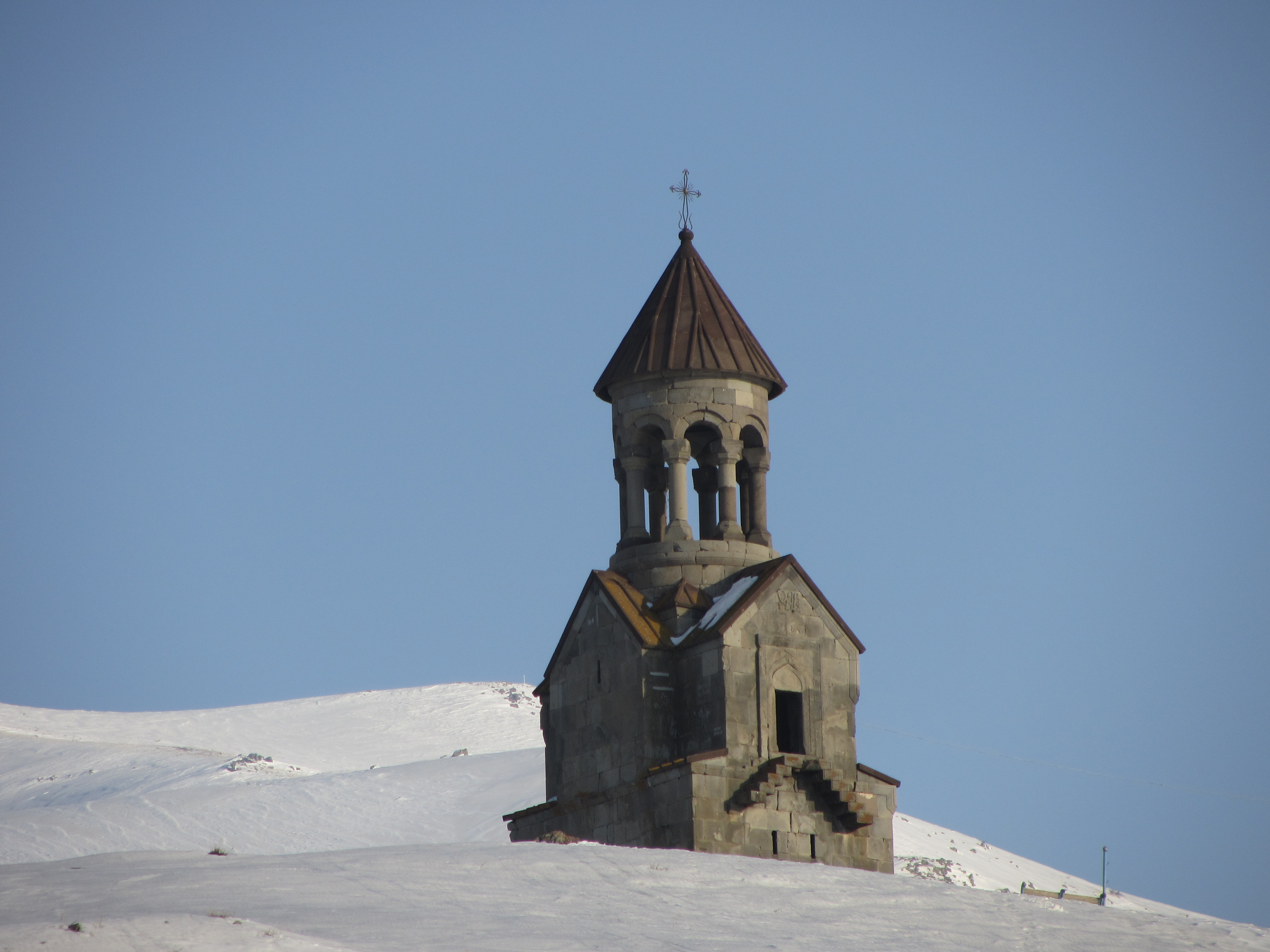
Kaptavank Church

== See also ==
- Kotayk Province
