= Toyozhnoye mine =

Iron mine in Russia

- Location: Sakha Republic, Russia
- Products: Iron ore

The Toyozhnoye mine is a large iron mine located in eastern Russia in the Sakha Republic. Toyozhnoye represents one of the largest iron ore reserves in Russia and the world with estimated reserves of 1.2 billion tonnes of ore grading 39.8% iron metal.
