= Lebedinskiy mine =

- Location: Kursk Oblast, Russia
- Products: Iron ore

The Lebedinskiy mine is a large iron mine located in western Russia in the Kursk Oblast. Lebedinskiy represents one of the largest iron ore reserves in Russia and in the world having estimated reserves of 20.2 billion tonnes of ore grading 35% iron metal.
