= Holdong mine =

- Location: North Hwanghae Province, North Korea
- Products: Gold, Copper, Silver, Iron

The Holdong mine (Korean: 홀동광산) is one of the largest gold mines in North Korea and in the world. The mine is located in the south of the country in Yonsan County, North Hwanghae Province. The mine has estimated reserves of 63.2 million oz of gold and 149.8 million oz of silver. The mine also has reserves amounting to 520 million tonnes of ore grading 0.35% copper metal and 266 million tonnes of ore grading 26% iron metal.
