= Bjørnevatn mine =

Mine in Norway

Coordinates: 69°39′19″N 30°00′53″E

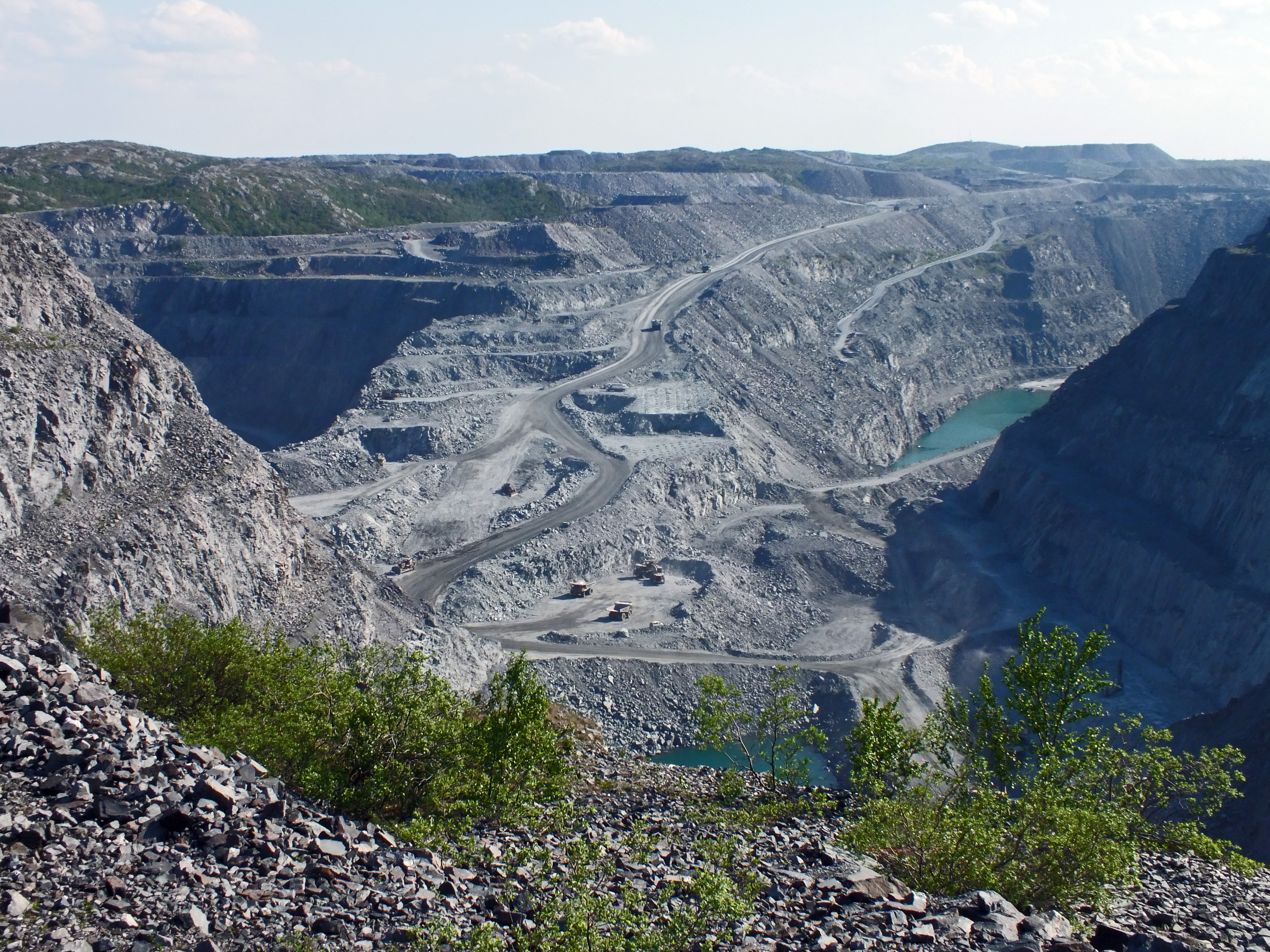
- Bjørnevatn Mine in Finnmark, close to the Russian border

- Location within Norway
- Location: Bjørnevatn, Finnmark, Norway
- Products: Iron

The Bjørnevatn mine is a large mine in the north of Norway in Finnmark. Bjørnevatn represents one of the largest iron reserves in Norway, having estimated reserves of 565 million tonnes of ore grading 31% iron.
