= Wadi Sawawin mine =

- Location: Al Madinah Province, Saudi Arabia
- Products: Iron

The Wadi Sawawin mine is an iron ore mine located in the west of Saudi Arabia in Al Madinah Province. Wadi Sawawin covers one of Saudi Arabia's largest iron deposits, with an estimated reserve of 383 million tonnes of ore grading 40% iron.

== See also ==
- Maaden (company)
