= Nizhne-Angarskoye mine =

Iron mine in Russia

- Location: Sakha Republic, Russia
- Products: Iron ore

The Nizhne-Angarskoye mine is a large iron mine located in eastern Russia in the Sakha Republic. Nizhne-Angarskoye represents one of the largest iron ore reserves in Russia and in the world having estimated reserves of 1.2 billion tonnes of ore grading 40.4% iron metal.
