= Yeristovskoye mine =

Iron mine in Ukraine

Yeristivske mine
- Location within Ukraine
- Location: Poltava Oblast, Ukraine; 49.0999°N 33.6767°E
- Products: Iron ore
- Opened: 2011
- Company: Ferrexpo plc
- Website: www.ferrexpo.com/what-we-do/operations/yeristovo/
- Company
- Key people: Taras Zinchenko (Director)
- Revenue: 8,773,725,000 hryvnia (2025)
- Total assets: 19,095,738,000 hryvnia (2025)
- Number of employees: 192,609 (2025)

The Yeristivske mine is a large iron mine located in central Ukraine in the Poltava Oblast. Yeristivske represents one of the largest iron ore reserves in Ukraine and in the world having estimated reserves of 1.19 billion tonnes of ore grading 32% iron metal.
