= Băișoara mine =

Iron ore mine in Cluj County, Romania

- Location within Romania

Location
- Location: Băișoara, Cluj County, Romania; 46°35′15.5″N 23°22′24.29″E

Production
- Products: Iron ore
- Production: 50,000 tonnes of iron ore
- Financial year: 2008

The Băișoara mine is a large open pit mine in the north-western of Romania in Cluj County, 60 km south of Cluj-Napoca and 466 km north-west of the capital, Bucharest. Băișoara represents one of the largest iron ore reserves in Romania having estimated reserves of 6 million tonnes of ore. The mine produces around 50,000 tonnes of iron ore/year.
