= Hrazdan mine =

Iron ore mine in Kotayk, Armenia

- Location within Armenia
- Location: Hrazdan, Kotayk Province, Armenia; 40°34′37.78″N 44°47′58.2″E
- Products: Iron
- Company: Etibank

The Hrazdan mine is a large mine in the center of Armenia in Kotayk Province. Hrazdan represents one of the largest iron reserve in Armenia having estimated reserves of 77 million tonnes of ore grading 40% iron.
