= Ghelari mine =

Mine in Romania

- Location: Ghelari, Hunedoara County, Romania
- Products: Iron ore, sometimes Magnetite, Siderite, Limonite, in pockets: Hematite.
- Production: 200,000 tonnes of iron ore
- Financial year: 2008
- Opened: 1900
- Closed: September 2005
- Company: Minvest SA Deva

The Ghelari mine was a large open pit, also an underground iron ore mine in the western of Romania in Hunedoara County, 20 km south-west of Hunedoara and 411 km north-west of the capital, Bucharest. Ghelari represents one of the largest iron ore reserves in Romania having estimated reserves of 14 million tonnes of ore. The mine produced around 200,000 tonnes of iron ore/year.
