= Muncelu Mic mine =

Iron and gold mine in Hunedoara County, Romania

- Location: Vețel, Hunedoara County, Romania
- Products: Iron ore, Gold, Iron
- Production: 0 tonnes of iron ore
- Financial year: 2008
- Opened: 1951
- Closed: 1998

The Muncelu Mic mine was a large open pit mine in the western of Romania in Hunedoara County, 16 km southeast of Simeria and 387 km north-west of the capital, Bucharest. Muncelu Mic represents one of the largest iron ore reserves in Romania having estimated reserves of 6.5 million tonnes of ore. When it was operational it produced around 200,000 tonnes of iron ore/year. The mine also has a gold and silver reserves of around 5.4 million tonnes grading 1g/t gold and 8g/t silver resulting 173,000 oz of gold and 1.38 million oz of silver.
