= Lueta mine =

Iron mine in Romania

- Location: Lueta, Harghita County, Romania
- Products: Iron ore
- Production: 10,000 tonnes of iron ore
- Financial year: 2008
- Opened: 1900

The Lueta mine is a large open pit mine in central Romania in Harghita County, 36 km west of Miercurea Ciuc and 299 km north of the capital, Bucharest. Lueta represents one of the largest iron ore reserves in Romania having estimated reserves of 6 million tonnes of ore. The mine produces around 10,000 tonnes of iron ore/year.
