= Teufe =

German mining term for depth

Teufe is the German mining term for depth. The Teufe (h_{T}) indicates how deep a given point lies below the surface of an open-cast pit or below the ground level in the area surrounding the pit. By contrast, the height, h, refers to its distance from a reference surface 'above'. The vertical distance between the surface and a point in the mine (Grubengebäude), i.e. the vertical depth, was formerly also called the Seigerteufe. This difference is no longer made today. The terms Teufe and Seigerteufe are synonymous.

== Reference points ==
The Teufe is always given from a reference point. In earlier times, during the construction of galleries (Stollen) there was the concept of "gallery depth" or Stollenteufe. For this purpose, the survey engineer or Markscheider determined a fixed reference point from which measurements were made. The gallery was either above or below the reference point. If the gallery lay above the Markscheider's reference point, it had a positive "vertical height difference" (Seigerteufe). If the gallery lay below the reference point, it had a negative vertical height difference.With the emergence of mining engineering the upper surface of the terrain was used as the reference point, usually at the headgear.

Today the reference surface for mining in Germany is standard sea level (Normalhöhennull, NHN, formerly Normalnull). As a result there are negative and positive heights, however, these heights are not an indication of depth. If a point is below NHN, it is give a minus sign (-); if it is above, a plus sign (+). A height based on the NHN has the symbol H.
