= Jinling mine =

Iron mine in northern China

- Location: China
- Products: Iron ore

The Jinling mine is a large iron mine located in northern China. With estimated reserves of 166.1 million tonnes of ore grading 51% iron metal, Jinling not only represents one of the largest iron ore reserves in China, but also in the world.
