= Dognecea mine =

Iron ore mine in Romania

- Location within Romania

Location
- Location: Dognecea, Caraș-Severin County, Romania; 45°16′26.08″N 21°45′1.9″E (estimated)

Production
- Products: Iron ore
- Production: 10,000 tonnes of iron ore
- Financial year: 2008

History
- Opened: 1911

The Dognecea mine is a large open pit mine in the western of Romania in Caraș-Severin County, 23 km west of Reșița and 509 km north-west of the capital, Bucharest. Dognecea represents one of the largest iron ore reserves in Romania having estimated reserves of 9 million tonnes of ore. The mine produces around 10,000 tonnes of iron ore/year.
