= Ocna de Fier mine =

Iron ore mine in Caraș-Severin County, Romania

- Location within Romania
- Location: Ocna de Fier, Caraș-Severin County, Romania; 45°20′31″N 21°46′35″E (approximate)
- Products: Iron ore
- Production: 10,000 tonnes of iron ore
- Financial year: 2008
- Opened: 1900

The Ocna de Fier mine is a large open pit mine in the western of Romania in Caraș-Severin County, 25 km west of Reșița and 511 km north-west of the capital, Bucharest. Ocna de Fier represents the largest iron ore reserves in Romania having estimated reserves of 200 million tonnes of ore grading 25% iron metal. The mine produces around 10,000 tonnes of iron ore/year.
