= Karelsky Okatysh mine =

Iron mine in Russia

Karelskiy Okatysh mine
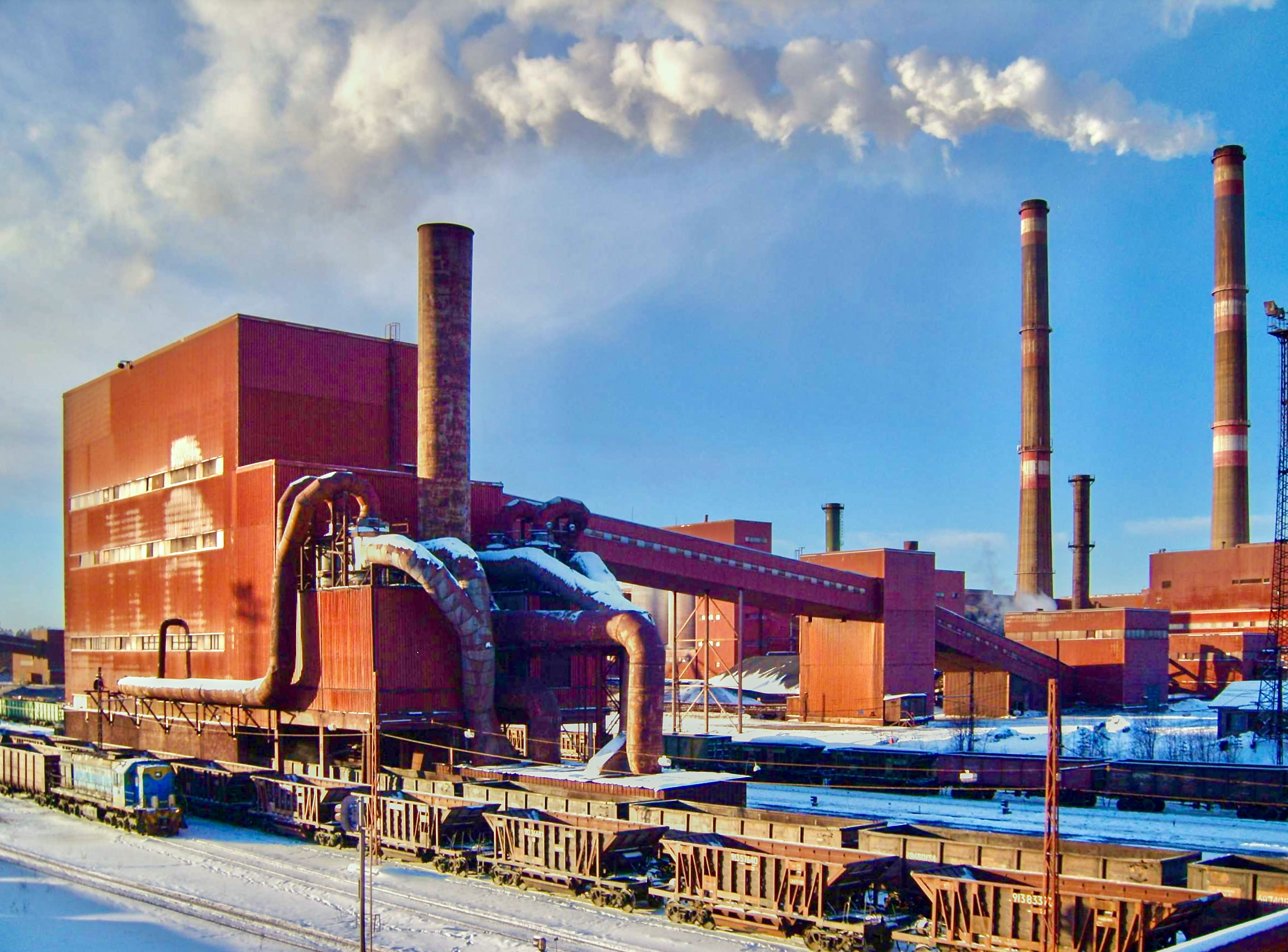
- Interactive map of Karelskiy Okatysh mine
- Location: Republic of Karelia, Republic of Karelia, Russia; 64.69°N 30.66°E
- Products: Iron ore, pellets
- Opened: 1982
- Company: Severstal
- Website: http://www.kostomuksha.ru/rus/index.phtml

The Karelskiy Okatysh mine is a large iron mine located in the northwest of Russia in the Republic of Karelia. Karelskiy Okatysh represents one of the largest iron ore reserves in Russia and in the world having estimated reserves of 1.29 billion tonnes of ore grading 63.2% iron metal.

== Products ==
The mine produce about 10.6 million tonnes of high quality iron pellets annually.

== Technologies ==
The mine is using 3D CAD mine planning software for quality and volumes control. Fully integrated with fleet management systems for the dump truck flow optimisation. Drills fleet equipped by high precision system for navigation and data integrity for blast optimization. The high precision system on excavators are used for ore quality management from slaughtering to stockpiles. High precision dozer systems working to improve quality, reduce costs in road maintenance and construction.
