= Kostomuksha mine =

- Location within Russia
- Location: Republic of Karelia, Russia; 64°43′N 30°30′E
- Products: Iron ore

The Kostomuksha mine is a large iron mine located in north-western Russia in the Republic of Karelia. Kostomuksha represents one of the largest iron ore reserves in Russia and the world, having estimated reserves of 10 billion tonnes of ore grading 45% iron metal.
