= Ploiești National Coal Company =

Societatea Naționala a Cărbunelui Ploiești
- Company type: Public
- Industry: Coal
- Founded: 1957
- Headquarters: Ploiești, Romania
- Key people: Leonida Badin, CEO
- Products: Bituminous coal
- Revenue: US$50 million (2009)
- Number of employees: 100 (2009)
- Website: http://www.snc-ploiesti.ro

The Ploiești National Coal Company (Romanian: Societatea Națională a Cărbunelui Ploiești) was set up as a commercial endeavor by the Government of Romania in 1957. The main headquarters of the company is placed in Ploiești, Prahova County. The company has its material base in eight counties Argeș County, Covasna County, Bihor County, Sălaj County, Bacău County, Prahova County, Dâmbovița County and Harghita County with total reserves of 59 million tonnes of coal.

The annual production is around 2 million tonnes of bituminous coal and the total number of employees is around 100.
