= List of mines in Norway =

This list of mines in Norway is subsidiary to the list of mines article and lists working, defunct and future mines in the country and is organised by the primary mineral output. For practical purposes stone, marble and other quarries may be included in this list.

== Coal ==
- Camp Morton, Svalbard

== Copper ==
- Jakobsbakken
- Løkken Mine
- Røros Copper Mines

== Iron ==
- Bjørnevatn mine

== Phosphate ==
- Ødegården Verk

== Pyrite ==
- Løkken Mine

== Silver ==
- Kongsberg Silver Mines

== Titanium ==
- Engebø mine
- Engebøfjell mine
- Kodal mine
- Ødegården Verk
- Rødsand mine
- Selvåg mine
- Storgangen mine
- Tellnes mine

== Tungsten ==
- Målviken mine

== Zinc ==
- Allmannajuvet
- Jakobsbakken

== See also ==
- Norwegian Directorate of Mining
