= List of mines in Egypt =

This list of mines in Egypt is subsidiary to the list of mines article and lists working, defunct and future mines in the country and is organised by the primary mineral output. For practical purposes stone, marble and other quarries may be included in this list.

- Coal mines
  - El Maghara mine
- Gold mines
  - Sukari mine
- Phosphate mines
  - Abu Tartur mine
- Tantalum mines
  - Abu Dabab mine
  - El Nuweiba mine
  - Umm Naggat mine
