= Kameno =

Kameno Камено
- Location of Kameno
- Coordinates: 42°34′N 27°18′E
- Country: Bulgaria
- Provinces (Oblast): Burgas

Government
  - Mayor: Zhelyo Vardunski
- Elevation: 15 m (49 ft)

Population (December 2009)
  - Total: 4,848
- Time zone: UTC+2 (EET)
  - Summer (DST): UTC+3 (EEST)
- Postal Code: 8120
- Area code: 05515

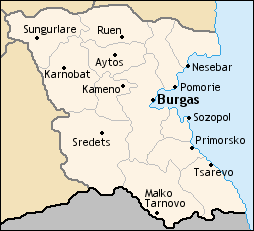
Map of Burgas Province

Kameno (Bulgarian: Камено, pronounced [ˈkamɛno]) is a small town in southeastern Bulgaria, part of Burgas Province. It is the administrative centre of the homonymous Kameno Municipality, which lies in the central part of the Province. As of December 2009, the town had a population of 4,848.

The town has a community centre (chitalishte) opened in 1927 and named Prosveta ("Enlightenment"). Kameno lies close to the towns of Balgarovo and Burgas.

== Municipality ==
Kameno municipality includes the following 13 places:

- Cherni Vrah
- Kameno
- Konstantinovo
- Krastina
- Livada
- Polski Izvor
- Rusokastro
- Svoboda
- Trastikovo
- Troyanovo
- Vinarsko
- Vratitsa
- Zhelyazovo
