= Lists of mines =

This lists of mines is a meta-list (list of lists) containing links to mine-related lists.

== By production ==
- List of coal mines by location
  - List of coal mines in Canada
  - List of coal mines in Japan
  - List of collieries in Newcastle (Australia)
  - List of coal mines in Queensland
  - List of coal mines in the United Kingdom
    - List of collieries in Yorkshire (1984–2015)
  - List of coal mines in the United States
- List of copper mines
  - List of copper mines in Canada
  - List of copper mines in the United States
- List of diamond mines
- List of gold mines
  - List of gold mines in Australia
    - List of active gold mines in Western Australia
  - List of gold mines in Canada
  - List of gold mines in Japan
  - List of largest gold mines by production
  - List of gold mines in Tanzania
  - List of gold mines in the United States
    - List of active gold mines in Nevada
    - List of gold mines in Georgia
- List of iron mines
  - List of iron mines in the United States
  - List of iron ore mines in Australia
- List of molybdenum mines
- List of nickel mines in Canada
- List of silver mines
- List of uranium mines

== By location ==
=== Africa ===
- List of mines in Africa
  - List of mines in Algeria
  - List of mines in Angola
  - List of mines in Botswana
  - List of mines in Burkina Faso
  - List of mines in Cameroon
  - List of mines in Egypt
  - List of mines in South Africa
  - List of gold mines in Tanzania

=== North America ===
==== Canada ====
- List of coal mines in Canada
- List of copper mines in Canada
- List of gold mines in Canada
- List of nickel mines in Canada
- List of uranium mines in Canada
- List of mines in Alberta
- List of mines in British Columbia
- List of mines in Manitoba
- List of mines in New Brunswick
- List of mines in Newfoundland and Labrador
- List of mines in the Northwest Territories
- List of mines in Nova Scotia
- List of mines in Nunavut
- List of mines in Ontario
- List of mines in Quebec
- List of mines in Temagami
- List of mines in Saskatchewan

==== Mexico ====
- List of mines in Mexico

==== United States ====
- Lists of mines in the United States
  - List of coal mines in the United States
  - List of copper mines in the United States
  - List of gold mines in the United States
    - List of active gold mines in Nevada
    - List of gold mines in Georgia
  - List of iron mines in the United States
  - List of mines in California
  - List of mines in Michigan
  - List of mines in Oregon

=== Oceania ===
- List of mines in Australia
  - List of coal mines in Queensland
  - List of collieries in Newcastle (Australia)
  - List of gold mines in Australia
    - List of active gold mines in Western Australia
  - List of iron ore mines in Australia

=== South America ===
- List of mines in Bolivia
- List of mines in Chile
- List of mines in Peru
- List of mines in Brazil

=== Europe ===
- List of mines in Belgium
- List of mines in Bulgaria
- List of mines in Denmark
- List of mines in Estonia
- List of mines in Germany
- List of mines in Greece
- List of mines in Ireland
- List of mines in Kosovo
- List of mines in Norway
- List of mines in Poland
- List of mines in Portugal
- List of mines in Romania
- List of mines in Russia
- List of mines in Serbia
- List of mines in Ukraine
- List of mines in the United Kingdom
  - List of coal mines in the United Kingdom
    - List of collieries in Yorkshire (1984–2015)

=== Asia ===
- List of mines in Afghanistan
- List of mines in China
- List of mines in India
- List of mines in Indonesia
- List of mines in Japan
  - List of coal mines in Japan
  - List of gold mines in Japan
- List of mines in Kyrgyzstan
- List of mines in Mongolia
- List of mines in Pakistan
- List of mines in the Philippines

== Other ==
- List of deepest mines
- List of open-pit mines
- List of show mines
- List of lost mines

== See also ==
- Lists of countries by mineral production
