= List of mines in Bulgaria =

This list of mines in Bulgaria is subsidiary to the list of mines article and lists working, defunct and future mines in the country and is organised by the primary mineral output. For practical purposes stone, marble and other quarries may be included in this list.

== Coal ==
- Troyanovo-1 coal mine
- Troyanovo-3 coal mine

== Copper ==
- Assarel mine
- Elatsite mine

== Gold ==
- Chelopech mine

== Salt ==
- Mirovo mine
