= List of mines in Kyrgyzstan =

This list of mines in Kyrgyzstan is subsidiary to the list of mines article and lists working, defunct and future mines in the country and is organised by the primary mineral output. For practical purposes stone, marble and other quarries may be included in this list.

== Beryllium ==
- Kalesay mine

== Copper ==
- Bozymchak

== Gold ==
- Kumtor Gold Mine
- Makmal gold mine
- Talas mine
- Unkurtash mine

== Uranium ==
- Mailuu-Suu
