= List of mines in Burkina Faso =

The following list of mines in Burkina Faso is subsidiary to the lists of mines in Africa article and Lists of mines articles. This list contains working, defunct and future mines in the country and is organised by the primary mineral output(s) and province. For practical purposes stone, marble and other quarries may be included in this list. Operational mines are demarcated by bold typeface, future mines are demarcated in italics.

== Gold mines ==
- Bissa mine
- Kiaka mine

== Manganese ==
- Tambao
