= List of companies listed on Oslo Axess =

Oslo Axess is a regulated and licensed market under the auspices of the Oslo Stock Exchange. The purpose is to promote growth among smaller companies, and give them the benefits achieved by having shares traded on a regulated market.

== Currently listed companies ==
Company	Ticker	First day of listing	GICS Industry
Aega	OSE: AEGA	7 November 2011	Asset Management & Custody Banks
African Petroleum Corporation	OSE: APCL	30 May 2014	Oil & Gas Exploration & Production
Aqua Bio Technology	OSE: ABT	10 January 2008	Specialty Chemicals
Awilco LNG	OSE: ALNG	6 September 2011	Oil & Gas Storage & Transportation
EAM Solar	OSE: EAM	26 March 2013	Renewable Electricity
Hofseth BioCare	OSE: HBC	2 December 2011	Biotechnology
Hugo Games	OSE: HUGO	26 June 2015	Home Entertainment Software
Hunter Group	OSE: HUNT	12 June 2007	Oil & Gas Exploration & Production
NattoPharma	OSE: NATTO	30 January 2008	Health Care Distributors
Nordic Mining	OSE: NOM	14 September 2007	Diversified Metals & Mining
North Energy	OSE: NORTH	5 February 2010	Oil & Gas Exploration & Production
Philly Shipyard	OSE: PHLY	17 December 2007	Construction Machinery & Heavy Trucks
Pioneer Property Group	OSE: PPG+PREF	19 June 2015	Real Estate Operating Companies
Rem Offshore	OSE: REM	16 September 2009	Oil & Gas Equipment & Services
RomReal	OSE: ROM	11 June 2007	Real Estate Development
Saga Tankers	OSE: SAGA	18 June 2010	Oil & Gas Storage & Transportation
Scanship Holding	OSE: SSHIP	11 April 2014	Industrial Machinery
Songa Bulk	OSE: SBULK	24 May 2017	Marine

== See also ==
- List of companies listed on the Oslo Stock Exchange
