= List of mines in Cameroon =

The following list of mines in Cameroon is subsidiary to the lists of mines in Africa article and Lists of mines articles. This list contains working, defunct and future mines in the country and is organised by the primary mineral output(s) and province. For practical purposes stone, marble and other quarries may be included in this list. Operational mines are demarcated by bold typeface, future mines are demarcated in italics.

Cameroon has developed a reputation for failed mining projects, many of which never break ground and some of which are later revealed to have been outright scams. Also, much of the mining is done through small-scale artisanal operations or semi-mechanized mining. As such, the list of mines within the country may not fully reflect on-the-ground reality.

== Bauxite ==
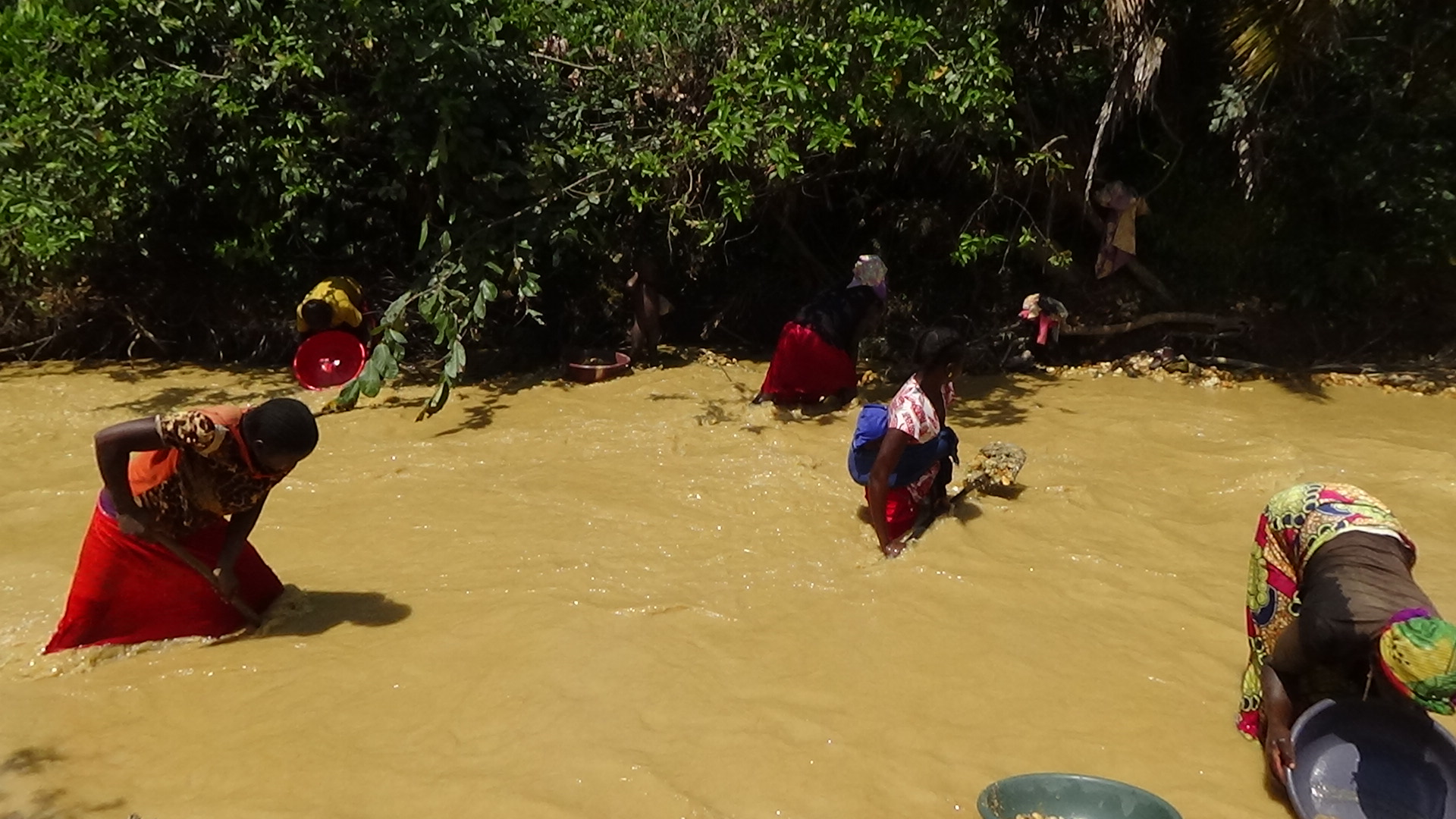
Mining operations in Cameroon are often small-scale ("artisanal") undertakings, such as these women panning for gold in the Adamawa Region.

- Minim Martap mine (operations beginning in 2026)

== Diamond ==
- Mobilong diamond mine (never operational)

== Iron ==
- Mbalam mine (cross-border mining site with the Republic of the Congo; various abortive attempts since the 2000s, planned operations beginning in December 2025)
- Nkout mine (exploratory work as of August 2025)
