= List of mines in Africa =

This list of mines in Africa is subsidiary to the list of mines article and lists working, defunct and future mines on the continent and is organised by the primary country location. For practical purposes stone, marble and other quarries may be included in this list.

== Democratic Republic of Congo ==
=== Gold ===
Kibali gold mine

== Lesotho ==
=== Diamond ===
- Letseng diamond mine
- Liqhobong diamond mine

== Liberia ==
=== Iron ===
- Bong mine

== Namibia ==
Diamonds

- Sperrgebiet Diamond Mining <https://www.sperrgebietdiamonds.com/elizabeth-bay-mine/>
- DebMarine <https://debmarine.com/>

=== Tin ===
- Uis mine

== Mauritania ==
=== Uranium ===
- A238 mine

== Niger ==
=== Gold ===
- Samira Hill Gold Mine

=== Uranium ===
- Adrar Emoles mine
- Arlit mine
- Imouraren mine
- Madaouéla mine
- Takardeit mine

== Senegal ==
=== Iron ===
- Falémé mine

== Tanzania ==
=== Diamond ===
- Williamson diamond mine

gold

== Zimbabwe ==
=== Diamond ===
- Murowa diamond mine

=== Gold ===
- Madziwa Mine
