= Mimi Berdal =

Norwegian lawyer and businessman

- Born: 15 June 1959 (age 66)
- Education: University of Oslo (cand. jur.)
- Occupations: lawyer and businessperson
- Known for: having the most board memberships of all women in Norway, with approximately 90
- Notable work: chaired Stabæk Fotball, Rec, Rocksource and Infratek

Mimi Kristine Berdal (born 15 June 1959) is a Norwegian lawyer and businessperson.

A lawyer by profession, she graduated as cand. jur. (Candidate of Law) from the University of Oslo in 1987. She was a research assistant from 1985 to 1986, worked for Total from 1989 and worked as a lawyer from 1990.

== Achievement ==
She chaired the board of directors of Stabæk Fotball from 2005 to 2009, became chair of Rec in 2013, has chaired Rocksource and Infratek, and is a member of the board of Itera, Synnøve Finden, Q-Free and Gassco and a former member of the board of Norsk Rikstoto and Øvrevoll Galopp. She has been recognised as having the most board memberships of all women in Norway, with approximately 90.
