= Nordic Mining =

Norwegian company

Nordic Mining ASA
- Type: ASA
- Industry: Mining
- Founded: 23 February 2006
- Founder: Rocksource ASA
- Headquarters: Munkedamsveien 45, N-0250 Oslo, Norway
- Products: Au; Co; Cu; Li; Ni; Pt/Pd; Quartz; Rutile
- Number of employees: 6 (2026)
- Website: NordicMining.com

Nordic Mining ASA is an Anglo-Norwegian mining company based in Norway. Focussing on exploration and production of industrial minerals and metals, the company is primarily involved in rutile, quartz, and lithium. The company's shares are listed on Oslo Axess.

The company's Engebø Mine by Førde Fjord in Western Norway has been the centre of controversy because waste from the mine is deposited in the fjord. The Norwegian government approved this in 2015, but after an extensive legal process, in June 2026, the Supreme Court of Norway found the permit to be against EU law. In September 2026, the government granted a temporary permit allowing Nordic Mining to continue dumping waste in the fjord.

== History ==
Originally an integrated part of Norwegian petroleum company Rocksource ASA, today's Nordic Mining ASA was de-merged and established as an independent public limited company on 23 February 2006, and received Rocksource ASA's assets and liabilities related to metals and minerals. In September 2006, Nordic Mining ASA also acquired claims to the Engebøfjell rutile deposit from ConocoPhillips Investments Norge AS.

In 2014, Nordic Mining applied for permits to dump 6 tonnes of mining waste in Førde Fjord every year for the 50 year lifespan of the mine, which the government approved in 2024 after years of protests and legal challenges, despite a 2021 statement from the European Free Trade Association Surveillance Authority (ESA) that the permit was against the EU Mining Directive. In June 2026, after a series of court cases, the Norwegian Supreme Court found that the permits were illegal. In September 2026, the Norwegian government revoked the permanent permit that had been given in 2015, but gave a new, temporary, three-year permit allowing the company to continue to dump tailings in the fjord. In October 2026, the environmental group Natur og ungdom organised protests against the government ignoring the court's ruling.

Nordic Mining signed an exclusive five-year contract with Barton Mines in 2023 to sell all their garnet. However, in 2026 Barton broke the contract on the grounds that neither the quality nor quantity of garnet was good enough.

In the Arctic Environmental Responsibility Index (AERI) Nordic Mining is ranked no. 42 out of 120 oil, gas, and mining companies involved in resource extraction north of the Arctic Circle.

== Information ==
Nordic Mining ASA is a Norwegian public limited company (allmennaksjeselskap), registered with VAT number NO 989 796 739 in the Norwegian Register of Business Enterprises. Listed on the Oslo Stock Exchange market Oslo Axess since 14 September 2007, Nordic Mining ASA shares have ticker symbol NOM.OAX and ISIN NO 001 031 7340. They are also listed on the Nasdaq OMX market First North (ticker symbol: NOMo.ST) in Stockholm, Sweden.

== Subsidiaries and projects ==
Subsidiaries

Company	Country	VAT no.
Nordic Rutile AS (100 %)	Norway	NO 990 691 606
Nordic Quartz AS (100 %)	Norway	NO 996 814 025
Nordic Ocean Resources AS (80 %)	Norway	NO 996 814 114
Keliber Oy (c. 25%)	Finland	

Domestic projects

Name	Location	Region	Metals/minerals	Status	R.
Engebø	Engebø, Sunnfjord Municipality	Western Norway	Rutile (high-grade), Garnet	Production (2026)	
Kvinnherad	Nesodden, Kvinnherad Municipality	Western Norway	Quartz (high-purity)	Scoping (2015)	
Øksfjord	Reinfjord and Lokkarfjord, Øksfjord	Northern Norway	Cobalt, Copper, Gold, Nickel, Platinum/Palladium	Exploration (2015)	

International projects

Name	Country	Metals/minerals	Status	R.
Keliber	Finland	Lithium	Pre-feasibility (2015)	

=== Engebø Project ===
The Engebø Project at Engebø in Sunnfjord Municipality, Vestland, is operated and fully owned by Nordic Mining ASA via Nordic Rutile AS. The rutile deposit at Engebø is among the largest in the world. Engebø also contains almandine garnet, which is used as an abrasive. The project has an estimated production time of 50 years.

The project is highly controversial because it involves depositing large amounts of waste called tailings into Førde Fjord. In April 2015, The Ministry of Local Government and Modernisation approved the Engebø Project, parallelly with The Ministry of Climate and Environment granting a related discharge permit. However, after a series of court cases, in 2026 the Norwegian Supreme Court found that the government permits given in 2015 broke EU law, and yet after this ruling, the government gave a new temporary permit for three years.

=== Kvinnherad Project ===
The Kvinnherad Project at Nesodden in Kvinnherad Municipality, Vestland, is operated and fully owned by Nordic Mining ASA via Nordic Quartz AS. Kvinnherad contains both normal and high-purity quartz.

=== Øksfjord Peninsula Project ===
The Øksfjord Peninsula Project in Reinfjord and Lokkarfjord in Øksfjord, in Loppa Municipality in Finnmark – Finnmárku county, is operated and fully owned directly by Nordic Mining ASA. The project is located in the Seiland Igneous Province, known for several types of metals: nickel, copper, cobalt, platinum/palladium, and gold.

=== Subsea mineral resources ===
Nordic Ocean Resources AS is a subsidiary of Nordic Mining ASA (80 percent) and Ocean Miners AS (20 percent). The company co-operates with Norwegian petroleum company Statoil ASA and the Norwegian University of Science and Technology regarding subsea mineral resources.

=== Keliber Oy ===
Keliber Oy (in Finnish) is a Finnish limited company operating lithium deposits in Kaustinen and Kokkola, Central Ostrobothnia. Approximately 16.3 percent of Keliber Oy's shares are owned by Nordic Mining ASA.

=== Alumina patent ===
In October 2015, Nordic Mining ASA and the Institute for Energy Technology were granted a patent, the so-called 'alumina patent', on a new technology, the so-called 'Aranda-Mastin process', for extraction of alumina from alternative mineral sources.

=== Maps ===
Vestland

Finnmark – Finnmárku

Central Ostrobothnia
