= List of mines in Greece =

The following list of mines in Greece is subsidiary to the lists of mines in Europe article and Lists of mines articles. This list contains working, defunct and future mines in the country and is organised by the primary mineral output(s) and province. For practical purposes stone, marble and other quarries may be included in this list. Operational mines are demarcated by bold typeface, future mines are demarcated in italics.

== Coal ==
- Drama coal mine
- Megalopoli Mine
- Ptolemaida-Florina coal mine

== Gold ==
- Olympias mine
- Siderocausa
- Skouries mine
