= List of mines in California =

This list of mines in California is subsidiary to the list of mines article and lists working, defunct and future mines in the U.S. state of California. It is organized by the primary mineral output. For practical purposes stone, marble and other quarries may be included in this list.

== Gold ==
Mine	Coordinates	Town	Owner	Dates	Comments
Argonaut Mine	38°21′47″N 120°47′7″W	Jackson	Argonaut Mining Company	1893–1942	registered as California Historical Landmark #786.
Bodie		Bodie		1861-1915	Is now a California State Historic Park
Golden Fleece Tunnel	39.185735°N 120.617152°W	Westville	Golden Fleece Mining & Milling Co.		
Iron Mountain Mine		Redding			
Kennedy Mine		Jackson		1886–1942	South of Sutter Gold Mine
Locarno Mine	35.394681°N 118.327025°W				
McLaughlin Natural Reserve					
Mesquite Mine					
Monte Cristo Gold Mine					
North Star Mine					
Sutter Gold Mine		Sutter Creek	Sutter Gold Mining Inc.		Tourist tours shut down in September 2011
Cerro Gordo Mine	36.537630883074755, -117.7919741219899	Keeler	Brent Underwood, Jon Bier	1866–1920	

== Silver ==
- Waterloo mine
