= List of mines in the United Kingdom =

This list of mines in the United Kingdom is subsidiary to the list of mines article and lists working, defunct and future mines in the country and is organised by the primary mineral output. This list does not include collieries (which are given at List of coal mines in the United Kingdom). For practical purposes stone, marble and other quarries may be included in this list.

== Operational ==
Mine	Commodity	Coordinates	Associated town	County	Owner	Dates	Notes	Refs
Barrow Mine	Gypsum (plaster)	52.744°N 1.123°W	Barrow upon Soar	Leicestershire	British Gypsum	1987–present	Output is used for plasters, renders etc.	
Boulby Mine	Potash/Polyhalite, rock salt	54.553°N 0.824°W	Staithes	North Yorkshire	Israel Chemical Limited	1973–present		
Cononish Mine	Gold/silver	56.418°N 4.770°W	Tyndrum	Stirling	Scotgold	2018–present	Developed in an old lead mine	
Fauld Mine	Gypsum	52.852°N 1.732°W	Tutbury	Staffordshire	British Gypsum	?–present	Product is used in cement manufacture	
Kilroot salt mine	Rock salt	54.728°N 5.748°W	Carrickfergus	Antrim	Irish Salt Mining	1965–present	Produces rock salt for roads, and salt licks for animals	
Lochaline Mine	Silica sand	56.541°N 5.774°W	Lochaline	Highland	Lochaline Quartz Sand	1940–2008; 2012–present	Produces glass sand	
Milldam Mine (closed)	Fluorspar/lead ore	53.299°N 1.737°W	Great Hucklow	Derbyshire		1985–2023	Produces around 150,000 tonnes (170,000 tons) of fluorspar per year	
Winsford Mine	Halite	53.209°N 2.519°W	Winsford	Cheshire	Compass Minerals	1928–present		
Woodsmith Mine	Polyhalite	54.435°N 0.623°W	Whitby	North Yorkshire	Anglo-American	2017–present		

== Defunct or closed ==
Mine	Commodity	Coordinates	Associated town	County	Owner	Dates	Notes
Odin Mine	Lead	53.34823°N 1.80168°W	Castleton	Derbyshire	Romans	Unknown–1869	
Silver Glen	Silver	56.1583°N 3.7852°W	Alva	Clackmannanshire	The Woodland Trust	18th century	The richest deposit of native silver ever found in the British Isles
Clogau	Gold	52.7618°N 3.9647°W	Bontddu	Gwynedd	Midas Exploration	1862–1998	
Dolaucothi	Gold	52.045°N 3.950°W	Pumsaint	Carmarthenshire		Unknown–1938	
Parys Mountain	Copper	53.386°N 4.344°W	Amlwch	Anglesey			
Sygun	Copper	53.0183°N 4.081°W	Beddgelert	Gwynedd		Unknown–1903	
Drakelands	Tungsten and tin	50.410°N 4.010°W	Plymouth	Devon	Wolf Minerals	1918–2018	
