= Locarno (disambiguation) =

Locarno is a town in Switzerland.

Locarno may also refer to:

== Places ==
- Locarno District, Ticino, Switzerland
- Locarno Beach, in Vancouver, British Columbia, Canada
- Locarno Dam, in Ticino, Switzerland
- Locarno Mine, in California, United States

== Other uses ==
- Locarno (Bristol), now O2 Academy Bristol, a music venue
- Locarno (typeface)
- 1937 Locarno, a minor planet
- FC Locarno, a Swiss football club
- Locarno Airport, in Switzerland
- Locarno Ballroom, in Glasgow, Scotland
- Locarno Festival, a Swiss film festival
- Locarno railway station, in Switzerland
- Locarno Treaties, concluded 1925
- Locarno Dance Hall, a dance hall in Coventry referred to in The Specials songs "Ghost Town" and "Friday Night and Saturday Morning"
