= Mobilong =

Mobilong may refer to the following places on the west bank of the Murray River in South Australia:

- Hundred of Mobilong, the historic cadastral land unit
- Murray Bridge, South Australia, formerly known as Mobilong
- Mobilong, South Australia, satellite locality of Murray Bridge, South Australia
  - Mobilong Swamp, waterbody on west bank of the Murray River within the Mobilong locality.
- District Council of Mobilong, former municipality surrounding the Murray Bridge township
- Mobilong Prison, Murray Bridge
- Port Mobilong, historic river port, Murray Bridge

== See also ==
- Mobilong diamond mine, Cameroon
