= List of mines in Angola =

This list of mines in the Angola is subsidiary to the list of mines article and lists working, defunct and future mines in the country and is organised by the primary mineral output. For practical purposes stone, marble and other quarries may be included in this list.

== Diamonds ==
- Camafuca diamond mine
- Catoca diamond mine
- Fucauma diamond mine
- Luarica diamond mine
- Luele Diamond Mine
- Lulo diamond mine
- Luminas diamond mine

== Iron ==
- Cassinga mine
