= List of mines in Portugal =

This list of mines in Portugal is subsidiary to the list of mines article and lists working, defunct and future mines in the country and is organised by the primary mineral output. For practical purposes stone, marble and other quarries may be included in this list.

== Coal ==
- Camadas de Guimarota
- Cloete

== Copper ==
- Neves-Corvo mine
- Sao Domingos Mine

== Gold ==
- Sao Domingos Mine

== Lead ==
- Aljustrel mine

== Pyrite ==
- Lousal mine
- Sao Domingos Mine

== Silver ==
- Sao Domingos Mine

== Tungsten ==
- Panasqueira
- Tabuaço mine

== Zinc ==
- Aljustrel mine
- Neves-Corvo mine
