= Cherni Vrah, Burgas Province =

Cherni Vrah
- Village
- Location in Bulgaria
- Coordinates: 42°26′40″N 27°20′30″E
- Country: Bulgaria
- Province: Burgas Province
- Municipality: Kameno Municipality
- Time zone: UTC+2 (EET)
  - Summer (DST): UTC+3 (EEST)

Cherni Vrah is a village in Kameno Municipality, in Burgas Province, in southeastern Bulgaria.
