= Troyanovo-3 coal mine =

Coal mine in Troyanovo, Burgas, Bulgaria

- Location: Troyanovo, Burgas Province, Bulgaria
- Products: Coal
- Production: 2,000,000
- Opened: 1964
- Company: Maritsa Iztok Complex

The Troyanovo-3 coal mine is a large coal mine located in Burgas Province, Bulgaria. Troyanovo-3 represents one of the largest coal reserve in Bulgaria having estimated reserves of 336.2 million tonnes of coal and an annual coal production of around 2 million tonnes.
