= Polski Izvor =

- Village
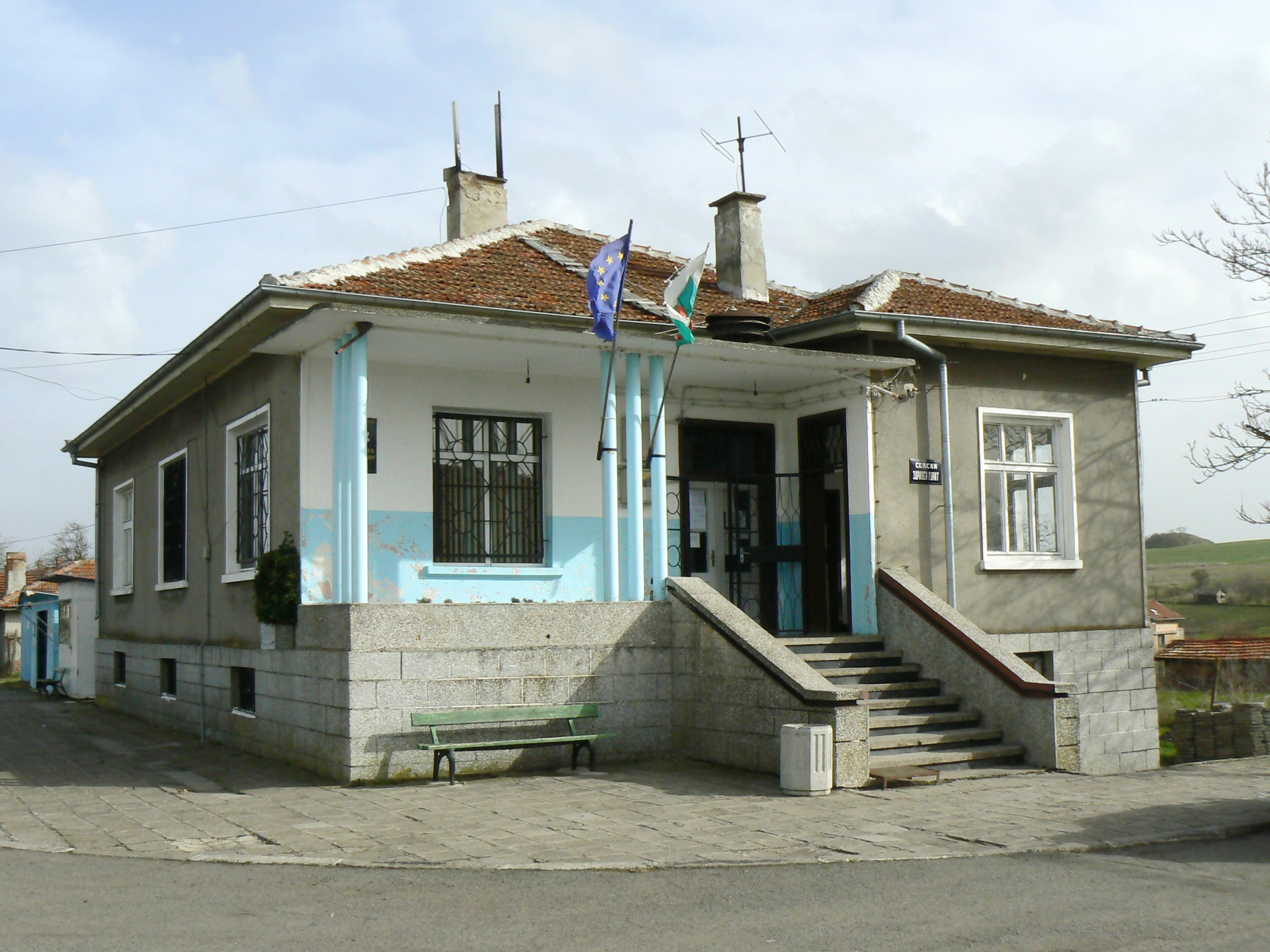

- Location within Bulgaria
- Coordinates: 42°27′N 27°17′E
- Country: Bulgaria
- Province: Burgas Province
- Municipality: Kameno Municipality
- Time zone: UTC+2 (EET)
  - Summer (DST): UTC+3 (EEST)

Polski Izvor is a village in Kameno Municipality, in Burgas Province, in southeastern Bulgaria.
