= Nkout mine =

Iron mine in south Cameroon

The Nkout mine is a large iron mine located in Cameroon's South Region, and one of the largest iron ore reserves in Cameroon and in the world having estimated reserves of 3 billion tonnes of iron ore. In 2013, IMIC signed an agreement with Hebei Iron & Steel for offtake of iron ore production. IMIC, who operated the mine through its subsidiary Caminex (Cameroon Mining Exploration), was bankrupted and ownership of the mine, as well as the total value of investments made by various companies, is disputed.

== See also ==
- List of mines in Cameroon
- List of iron mines
