= Minim Martap mine =

Bauxite mine in Adamawa Region, Cameroon

- Location: Adamawa Region, Cameroon
- Products: Bauxite; Silica
- Type: Open pit
- Company: Canyon Resources Ltd.
- Website: www.canyonresources.com.au/minim-martap-project/

The Minim Martap mine is a bauxite mine in the Adamawa Region in northern Cameroon. As of 2020, it has estimated reserves of 832 million tonnes. It takes its name from the nearby village of Minim. As of 2025, it is expected to open in 2026.

== See also ==
- List of mines in Cameroon
