= Pioneer Mine =

Iron mine in Ely, Minnesota, United States

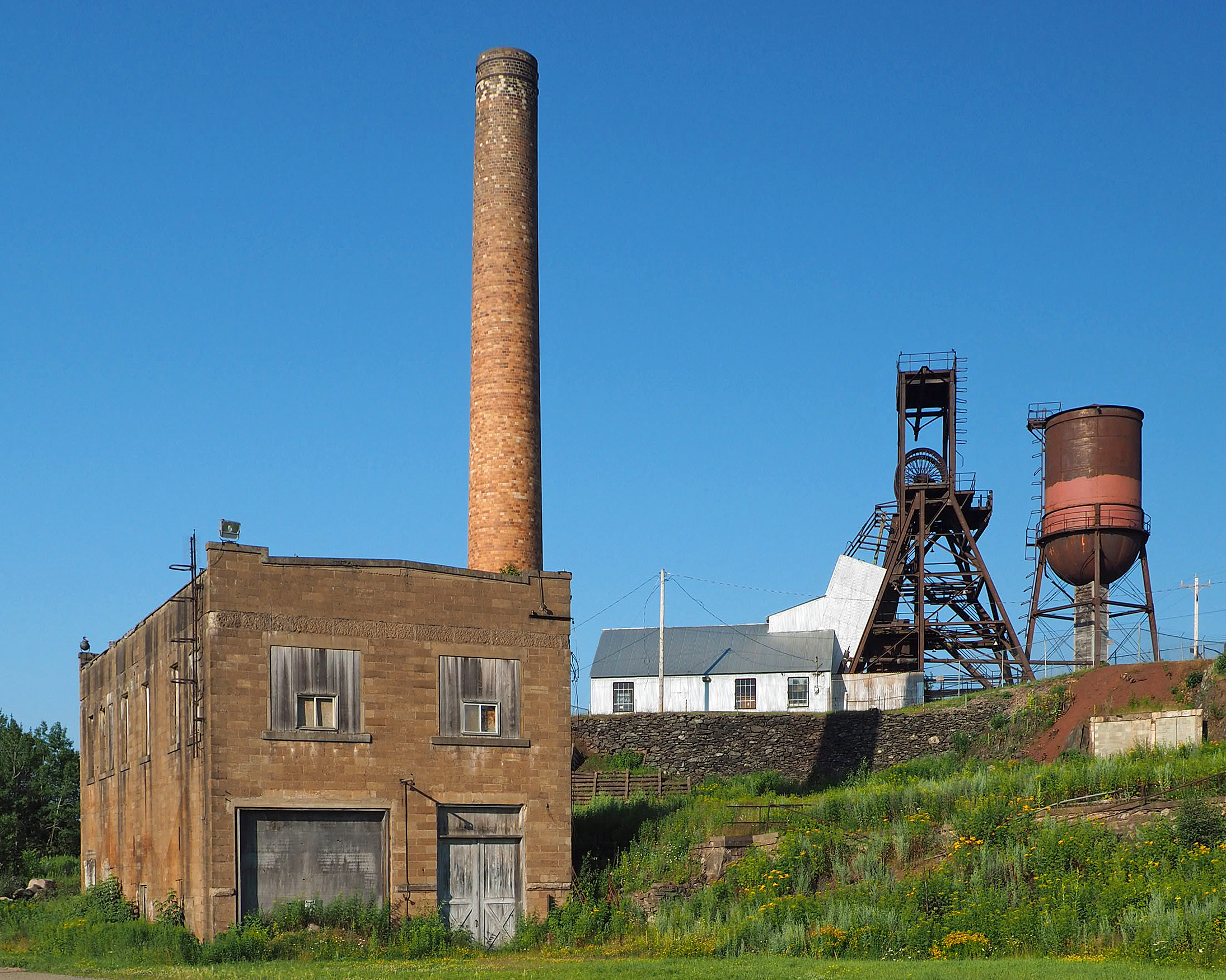
- The Pioneer Mine's surface structures viewed from the northeast

- Location within Minnesota
- Location: Vermilion Range, Minnesota, United States; 47°54′43″N 91°51′39″W
- Products: Iron ore
- Type: Underground
- Greatest depth: 1,700 feet (520 m)
- Opened: 1889
- Closed: 1967
- Pioneer Mine Buildings and "A" Headframe
- U.S. National Register of Historic Places
- U.S. Historic district
- Location: 401 N. Pioneer Road, Ely, Minnesota
- Area: Less than one acre
- NRHP reference No.: 78003127
- Added to NRHP: November 28, 1978

The Pioneer Mine was an underground iron mine in Ely, Minnesota, United States, in operation from 1889 to 1967. It is one of only two such mines on the Vermilion Range whose above-ground structures are still standing, the other being the Soudan Mine. The Pioneer Mine Buildings and "A" Headframe were listed on the National Register of Historic Places as a historic district in 1978 for their state-level significance in the themes of engineering and industry. They were nominated for being some of the last vestiges of a once-common mining technique on the Vermilion Range.

The complex is undergoing adaptive reuse as the Ely Arts & Heritage Center.

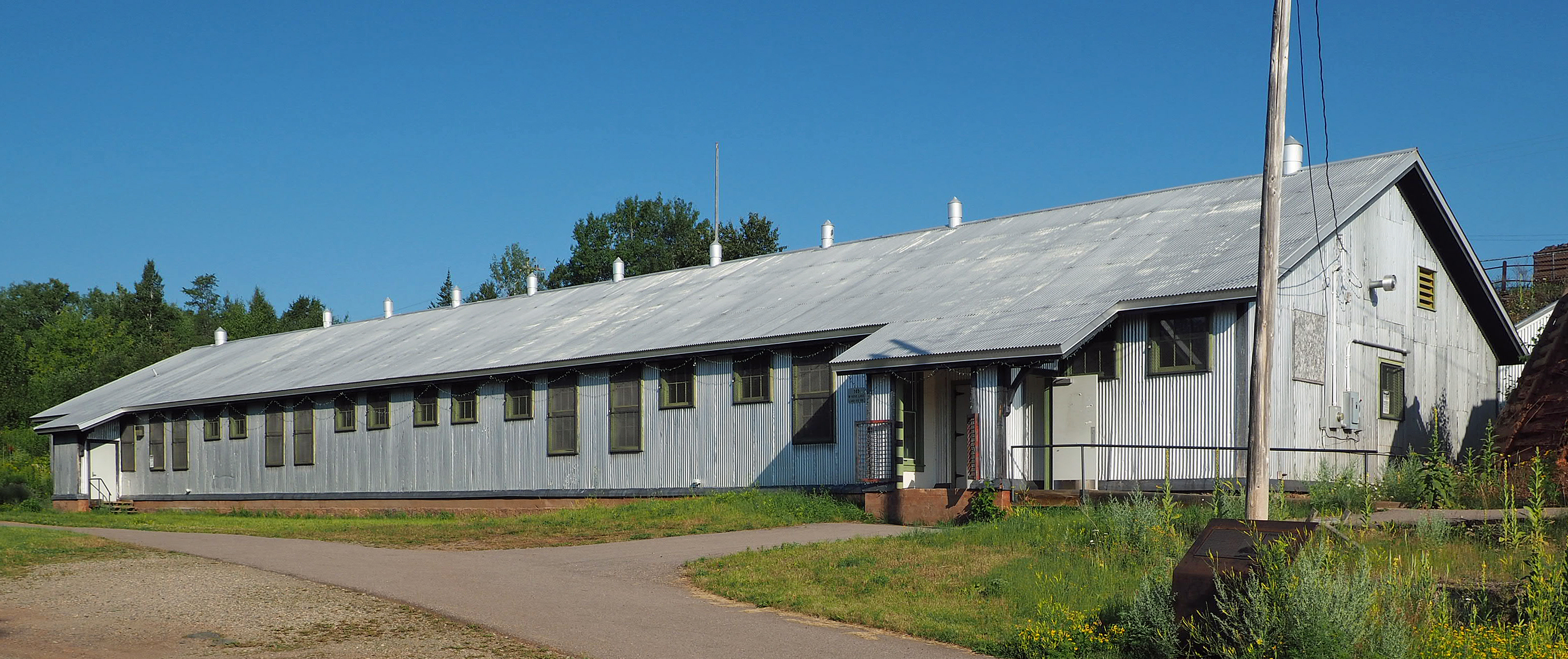
The Miners' Dry House

== See also ==
- List of iron mines in the United States
- National Register of Historic Places listings in St. Louis County, Minnesota
