= List of mines in Bolivia =

This list of mines in Bolivia is subsidiary to the list of mines article and lists working, defunct and future mines in the country and is organised by the primary mineral output. For practical purposes stone, marble and other quarries may be included in this list.

Mine	Produce	Coordinates	Associated town	Owner	Dates	Notes
Siglo XX	tin	18°25′S 66°38′W	Llallagua		1910–Present	
