= List of mines in Estonia =

This is the list of mines located in Estonia. The list is incomplete.

Name	Extracting mineral or natural resource	Location (county, parish)	Further info	Image
Aidu quarry				
Estonia quarry	oil shale			
Käina seamud deposit	seamud	Hiiu County	Of national importance	
Kohtla mine	oil shale	Ida-Viru County	Opened in 1937	
Marinova dolostone quarry				
Narva quarry	oil shale			
Piusa sand mine	sand	Võru County, Võru Parish		
Rummu quarry				
Sillamäe	uranium	Ida-Viru County	Closed	
Sirgala quarry	oil shale			
Viivikonna quarry	oil shale			
Viru quarry	oil shale			
