= Waterloo mine =

Silver mine in San Bernardino County, California, U.S.

Coordinates: 34.9528°N 116.88810°W

- Interactive map of Waterloo mine
- Location: San Bernardino County, California, United States
- Products: silver

The Waterloo mine is a large silver mine located in California. Waterloo has reserves estimated at 100.9 million ounces (2,860 metric tons).

== See also ==
- List of mines in California
