= Krastina =

- Village
- Location within Bulgaria
- Coordinates: 42°35′N 27°14′E
- Country: Bulgaria
- Province: Burgas Province
- Municipality: Kameno Municipality
- Time zone: UTC+2 (EET)
  - Summer (DST): UTC+3 (EEST)

Krastina is a village in Kameno Municipality, in Burgas Province, in southeastern Bulgaria.
