= List of gold mines in Japan =

This list of mines in Japan is subsidiary to the list of mines article and lists working, defunct and future mines in the country and is organised by the primary mineral output.

Mine	Coordinates	Associated town	Owner	Dates	Comments
Toi gold mine		Toi	Sumitomo Group	1370-1965	
Sado gold mine		Sado	Mitsubishi Group	1601-1989	
