= List of iron ore mines in Australia =

This list of iron ore mines in Australia is subsidiary to the list of mines article and lists working, defunct and planned mines in the country organised by state.

== Western Australia ==
=== Pilbara ===
Mine	Alternative names	Majority Owner	Status	1st Production Year	Output (mtpa)!
Area C mine	Mining Area C (MAC Mine)	BHP	Producing	2001	55
Balmoral South		Australasian Resources	Deposit	-	0
Brockman 4 mine		Rio Tinto	Producing	2010	22
Brockman 2 mine	Brockman mine	Rio Tinto	Producing	1992	8.7
Channar mine		Rio Tinto	Producing		20
Christmas Creek mine		Fortescue Metals Group	Producing		50
Cloud Break mine		Fortescue Metals Group	Producing		40
Cockatoo Island		Pluton Resources (under administration)	Not producing		0
Eastern Ridge mine	Orebody 23/25, Newman East	BHP			
Hope Downs mine		Rio Tinto / Hancock Prospecting	Producing		
Iron Valley mine		Mineral Resources Ltd	Producing		6
Jimblebar mine	Orebody 18 mine	BHP	Producing	2013	
Karara mine		Karara Mining	Producing	2013	8
Marandoo mine		Rio Tinto	Producing	1994	15
Mesa A mine	Waramboo mine, Mesa J mine (part of Mesa A)	Rio Tinto	Producing	1992	
Mt Tom Price mine		Rio Tinto	Producing	1966	28
Mt. Whaleback mine		BHP	Producing	1968	
Nammuldi mine		Rio Tinto	Producing	2006	6.6
Paraburdoo mine		Rio Tinto	Producing	1972	20
Pardoo mine		Atlas Iron Ltd	Producing	2008	2.4
Roy Hill		Hancock Prospecting	Producing	2014	
Shay Gap		Mount Goldsworthy Mining Associates	Closed in 1993	1973	
Solomon hub mine		Fortescue Metals Group	Producing	2013	72
South Flank mine		BHP	Under construction in 2020		
West Angelas mine		Rio Tinto	Producing	2002	35
Wodgina mine		Atlas Iron Ltd	Exhausted in 2017	2010	0
Yandicoogina mine		Rio Tinto	Producing	1998	52
Yandi mine		BHP	Producing	1991	79
Yarrie mine	Goldsworthy	BHP	Suspended in 2014	1993	0

=== Esperance Port ===
Mine	Alternative names	Majority Owner	Status	1st Production Year	Output (mtpa)
Koolyanobbing, Western Australia		Cliffs Natural Resources Limited			
Mt. Jackson		Cliffs Natural Resources Limited			
Yilgarn Iron Producers Association					

=== Geraldton / Mid West ===
Mine	Alternative names	Majority Owner	Status	1st Production Year	Year ceased	Output (mtpa)
Extension Hill/Iron Hill		Mount Gibson Iron	Reworking stockpiles	2011	2019	
Karara mine		Karara Mining	Producing	2013	-	8
Tallering Peak		Mount Gibson Iron	Closed	2003	2014	0

=== Offshore islands ===
- Koolan Island
- Koolan Island mine

== South Australia ==
- Cairn Hill mine
- Iron Baron
- Iron Duke
- Iron Knob, South Australia
- Iron Monarch
- Iron Prince
- Peculiar Knob - mothballed by Arrium in 2015
- Port Adelaide (multi-commodity port, export port for Cairn Hill ore)
- Whyalla port and Whyalla Steelworks (Processing plant and export port for iron ore and steel products)

== Northern Territory ==
- Frances Creek
- Union Reef - rail to Darwin

== Proposed ==
- New South Wales
  - Lockhart - Standard Mining.
