= Iron mining in the United States =

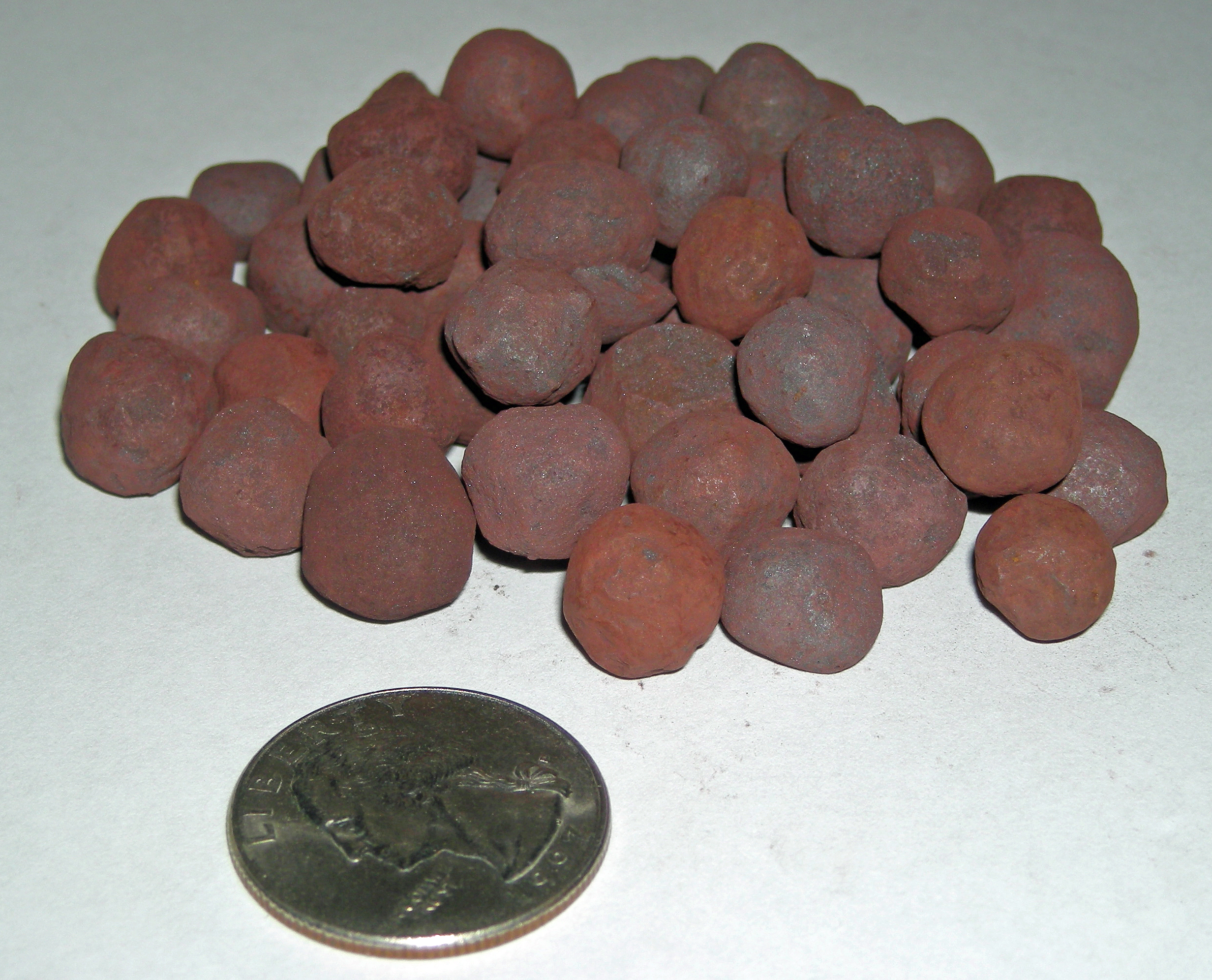
Processed taconite pellets as used in the steelmaking industry, with a US quarter (0.96 in./24.3 mm) shown for scale.

Iron mining in the United States produced 48 million metric tons of iron ore in 2019. Iron ore was the third-highest-value metal mined in the United States, after gold and copper. Iron ore was mined from nine active mines and three reclamation operations in Michigan, Minnesota, and Utah. Most of the iron ore was mined in northern Minnesota's Mesabi Range. Net exports (exports minus imports) were 3.9 million tons. US iron ore made up 2.5 percent of the total mined worldwide in 2015. Employment as of 2014 was 5,750 in iron mines and iron ore treatment plants.

US iron ore mining is dominated by the Precambrian banded iron formation deposits around Lake Superior, in Minnesota and Michigan; such deposits were also formerly mined in Wisconsin. For the past 50 years, more than 90 percent of US iron ore production has been mined from the Lake Superior deposits. None of the iron ore now mined in the US is “direct shipping” ore ready to be fed into the iron- and steel-making process. The ore is concentrated to raise the iron content before use. All the iron ore currently mined is from open pits.

== Minnesota ==
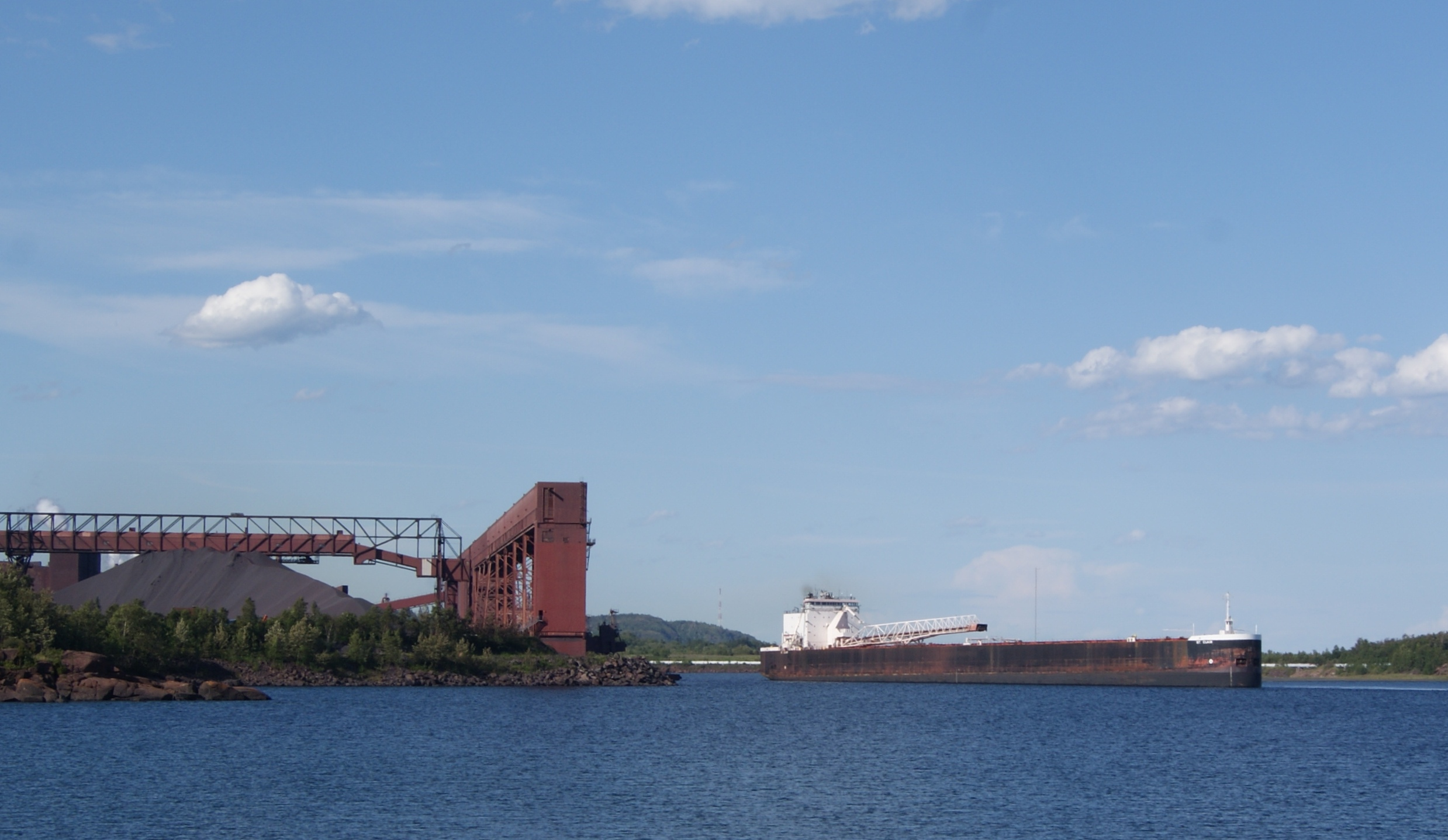
The St. Clair backing into the iron ore loading dock at Silver Bay, Minnesota, to take on taconite pellets

Minnesota provides the great bulk of the iron ore mined in the US. Iron ore comes from seven open-pit mines, and two tailings reclamation operations, one in St. Louis County, and one in Itasca County. Three of the mines are operated by Cleveland Cliffs, two by U.S. Steel, and one each by Mesabi Nugget Delaware LLC and Arcelor Mittal S.A. The two reclamation projects are operated by Magnetation, Inc.

== Michigan ==
Michigan iron ore came from two active mines on the Marquette Iron Range: the Tilden Mine, and the Empire Mine, both operated by Cleveland-Cliffs. In 2014, the two mines produced 12.1 million tons of pelletized iron ore concentrate. In 2016 the Empire Mine was shut down.

== Utah ==
The only recently operating iron mine in the US outside the Lake Superior area was the Iron Mountain mine, formerly called the Comstock-Mountain Lion mine, west of Cedar City, in Iron County, Utah. The mine shut down in October 2014. Operated by CML Metals, Inc. the mine produced ore with 54% iron. The ore was treated onsite, producing a concentrate containing 65% iron. The concentrate was transported by rail to California, then shipped to China.

== History of US iron ore mining ==
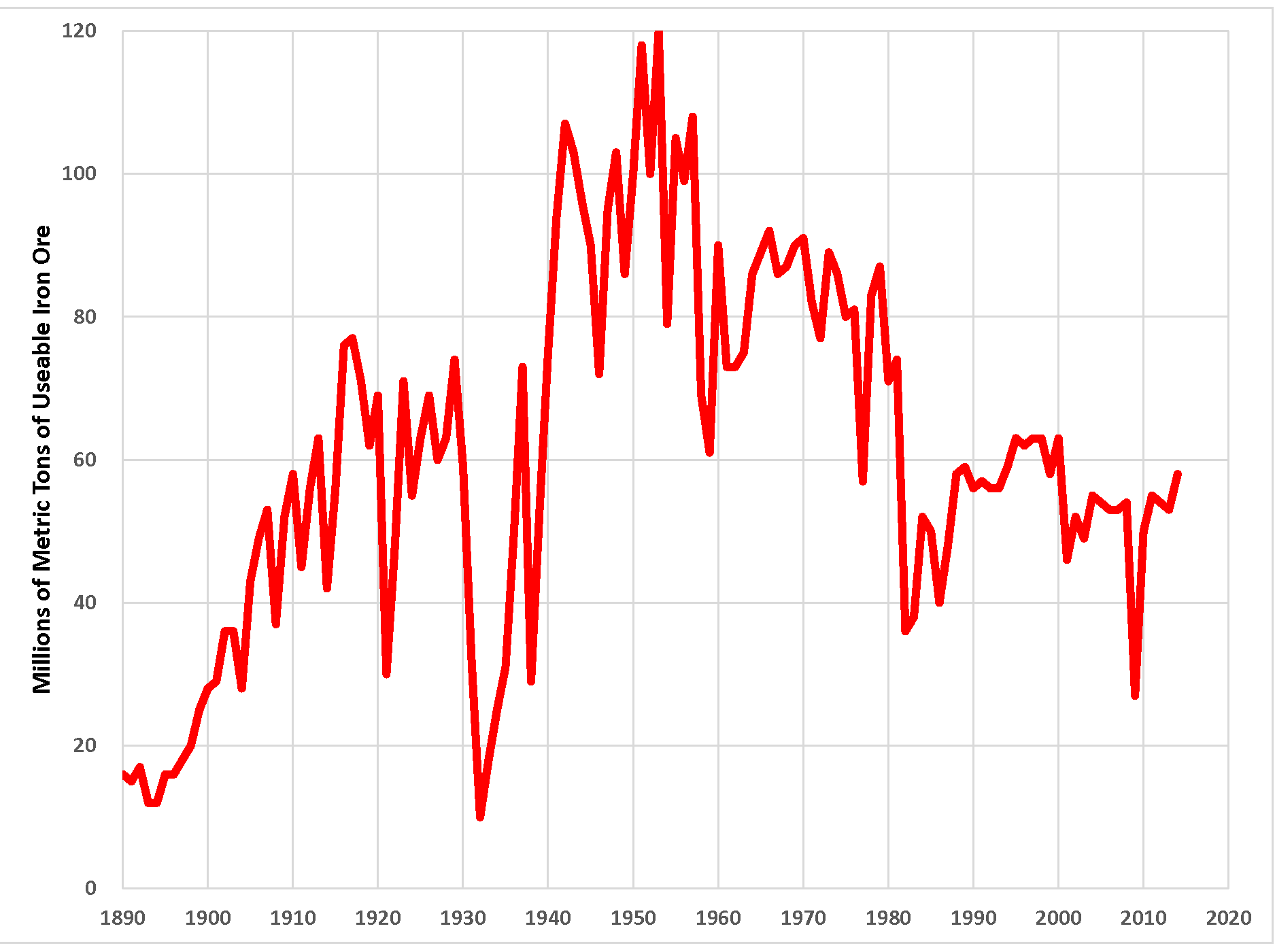
Graph of usable iron ore mined in the United States 1890–2014, data from USGS

In common with other commodities, the history of iron mining in the United States includes a shift to larger but lower-grade ore deposits, a shift from underground to open-pit mining, and a shift from labor-intensive mining to highly mechanized mining.

Although in 2014, the US mined only 1.8 percent of all iron ore mined worldwide, the US was previously a much larger factor in the world iron ore market. From 1937 through 1953, US iron ore made up more than a third of the world's iron ore production; the proportion of world iron ore mined in the US peaked in 1945 at 56 percent.

=== Colonial ===
Iron mining in the United States began in 1608, when a ship returning from the Jamestown Colony in Virginia carried a load of iron ore back to England. The manufacturing of iron from ore likely began in 1622, in what is now Chesterfield County, Virginia, but was halted when American Indians killed everyone in the establishment. John Winthrop, Jr. established an iron furnace at Quincy, Massachusetts (then part of Braintree, Massachusetts), which started making iron in 1644, but closed when it ran out of nearby ore in 1647. A more successful effort was established at Saugus, Massachusetts.

Iron production in the 1700s was done with charcoal, of which American forests could provide a seemingly endless supply. Numerous small iron mines supplied iron furnaces scattered throughout the colonies in the 1700s. Bog iron ore common around the Chesapeake Bay fed numerous iron furnaces in Maryland and Virginia set up to export to Britain.

=== Early republic ===
Although the bog iron ores mined in colonial days were widespread, the deposits were also small, and quickly exhausted. In the late 1700s the iron furnaces moved away from the bog iron ore of the coastal swamps, to larger iron ore deposits further inland. Inland locations also allowed the furnaces to be closer to sources of limestone, which was used as a flux in iron smelting. The proximity to larger ore deposits favored larger, more permanent iron smelters.

Most US iron mining before 1850 took place in eastern Pennsylvania, New York, and northern New Jersey. New Jersey's principal iron ore district, at Randolph, began mining in 1710. The Cornwall iron mine, the largest iron-producer in Pennsylvania, began mining in 1740. The Adirondack district of New York began mining in 1775.

Starting about 1820, coke from coal replaced charcoal as the fuel and reducing agent in iron furnaces. Coke has a higher crushing strength than charcoal, allowing larger smelting furnaces. Because iron and steel-making at the time consumed more coal than iron ore, the steel mills moved closer to the coal mines to minimize transportation costs. Although later overshadowed by production from the Lake Superior mines, iron ore mining in New Jersey and New York continued until the 1960s. Iron mining in Pennsylvania ended in 1973.

=== Lake Superior mining ===
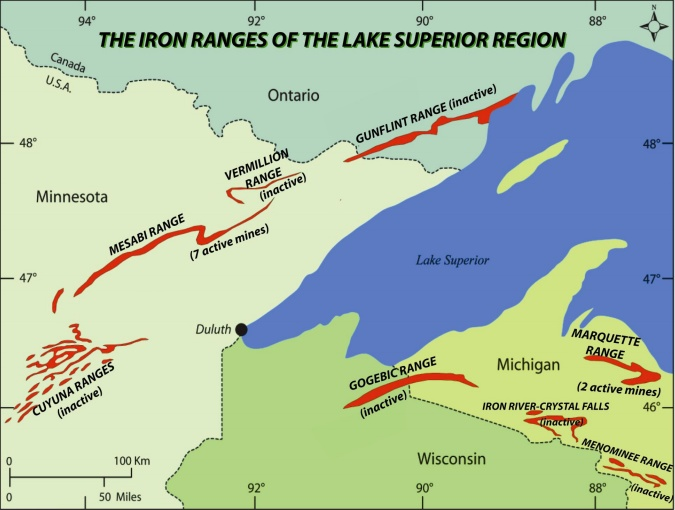
Lake Superior Iron Ranges

Iron ore was discovered on the Marquette Range in 1844, and mining started in 1848. Mining increased after the opening of the ship canal at Sault Ste. Marie provided cheap water transportation between the iron mines to the lower Great Lakes. The Lake Superior iron deposits were the largest ever discovered in the United States, and by the late 1800s, dominated American iron mining.

The Lake Superior iron ores occur in Precambrian banded iron formation, in long, linear belts called iron ranges. After the Marquette Range in Michigan, iron ore was discovered in the Menominee Range (Michigan) in 1867, the Gogebic Range (Michigan and Wisconsin) in 1884, Vermilion Range (Minnesota) in 1885, Mesabi Range (Minnesota) in 1890, and the Cuyuna Range (Minnesota) in 1903.

Prior to the start of iron mining on the Lake Superior iron ranges, US iron mining was done close to the iron furnaces. The large size of the Lake Superior deposits, and the access to cheap Great Lakes water transportation, enabled iron mining on a massive scale, located far from the iron furnaces. The Lake Superior iron ores, however, are located far from coal deposits, and the greater tonnage of coal required in steelmaking favored the location of furnaces closer to the coal mines. Favorable locations for steelworks using Lake Superior ore included Great Lakes ports such as Chicago, Cleveland, and Gary, as well as cities close to coal and with good water transportation, such as Pittsburgh. Although Lake Superior provides cheap shipping most of the year, from ports such as Duluth and Marquette, shipping by water halts in the winter months, and most ore is stockpiled until shipping resumes in the spring.

In the 1950s, the Lake Superior mines were running out of the high-grade “direct-shipping” ore. Experiments in concentrating the ores had been ongoing since the 1915. In 1954 the hematite ore (jasper, or jaspilite) began to be concentrated, and in 1956, the magnetite ore (taconite) was concentrated on a large scale. The concentrated ore is commonly formed into pellets for ease of handling.

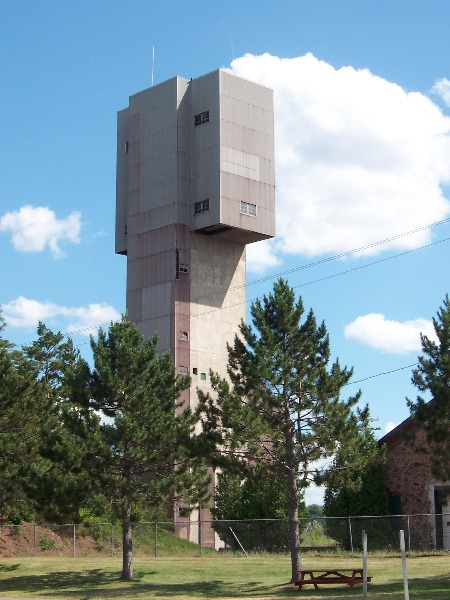
Cliffs Mine on Marquette Range

Through 1965, the Lake Superior iron ranges had produced 3.66 billion tons of ore, about 70 percent of which came from the Mesabi Range. Totals through 1965 were:

Mesabi Range 2,511 million tons

Marquette Range 339 million tons

Gogebic Range 323 million tons

Menominee Range 290 million tons

Vermilion Range 102 million tons

Cuyuna Range 100 million tons

=== Birmingham, Alabama ===
The largest production of US iron ore outside the Great Lakes districts was the Birmingham, Alabama district. Sedimentary iron ore in the Red Mountain formation of Silurian age was first used to make iron in 1864. Production was small until 1881, when major steelmaking began in Birmingham.

The last iron mine shut down in 1975, after the district had produced 376 million long tons of ore.

== See also ==
- Iron and steel industry in the United States
- List of iron mines in the United States
