= Troyanovo-1 coal mine =

Coal mine in Burgas Province, Bulgaria

- Interactive map of Troyanovo-1 coal mine
- Location: Troyanovo, Burgas Province, Bulgaria
- Products: Coal
- Production: 8,000,000
- Opened: 1952
- Company: Maritsa Iztok Complex

The Troyanovo-1 coal mine is a large coal mine located in Burgas Province. Troyanovo-1 represents one of the largest coal reserves in Bulgaria, having an estimated 525.3 million tonnes of coal reserves, and an annual coal production of around 8 million tonnes.
