= Svoboda, Burgas Province =

Svoboda
- Village
- Location in Bulgaria
- Coordinates: 42.571°N 27.317°E
- Country: Bulgaria
- Province: Burgas Province
- Municipality: Kameno Municipality
- Time zone: UTC+2 (EET)
  - Summer (DST): UTC+3 (EEST)

Svoboda is a village in Kameno Municipality, in Burgas Province, in southeastern Bulgaria.
