= Takardeit mine =

Uranium mine in Agadez Region, Niger

- Location: Agadez Region, Niger
- Products: uranium

The Takardeit mine is a large mine located in the northern part of Niger in Agadez Region. Takardeit represents one of the largest uranium reserves in Niger having estimated reserves of 23.5 million tonnes of ore grading 0.018% uranium.
