= Kiaka mine =

Gold mine in Zoundwéogo Province, Burkina Faso

- Location: Zoundwéogo Province, Burkina Faso
- Products: Gold

The Kiaka mine is one of the largest gold mines in the Burkina Faso . The mine is located in the center of the country in Zoundwéogo Province. The mine has estimated reserves of 5 million oz of gold.
