= Storgangen mine =

Titanium mine in Norway

- Interactive map of Storgangen mine
- Location: Rogaland, Norway; 58°21′46″N 6°20′41″E
- Products: Titanium

The Storgangen mine is one of the largest titanium mines in Norway. The mine is located near Sandbekk, Rogaland. The mine has reserves amounting to 60 million tonnes of ore grading 17-18% titanium.
