= Troyanovo, Burgas Province =

Troyanovo
- Village
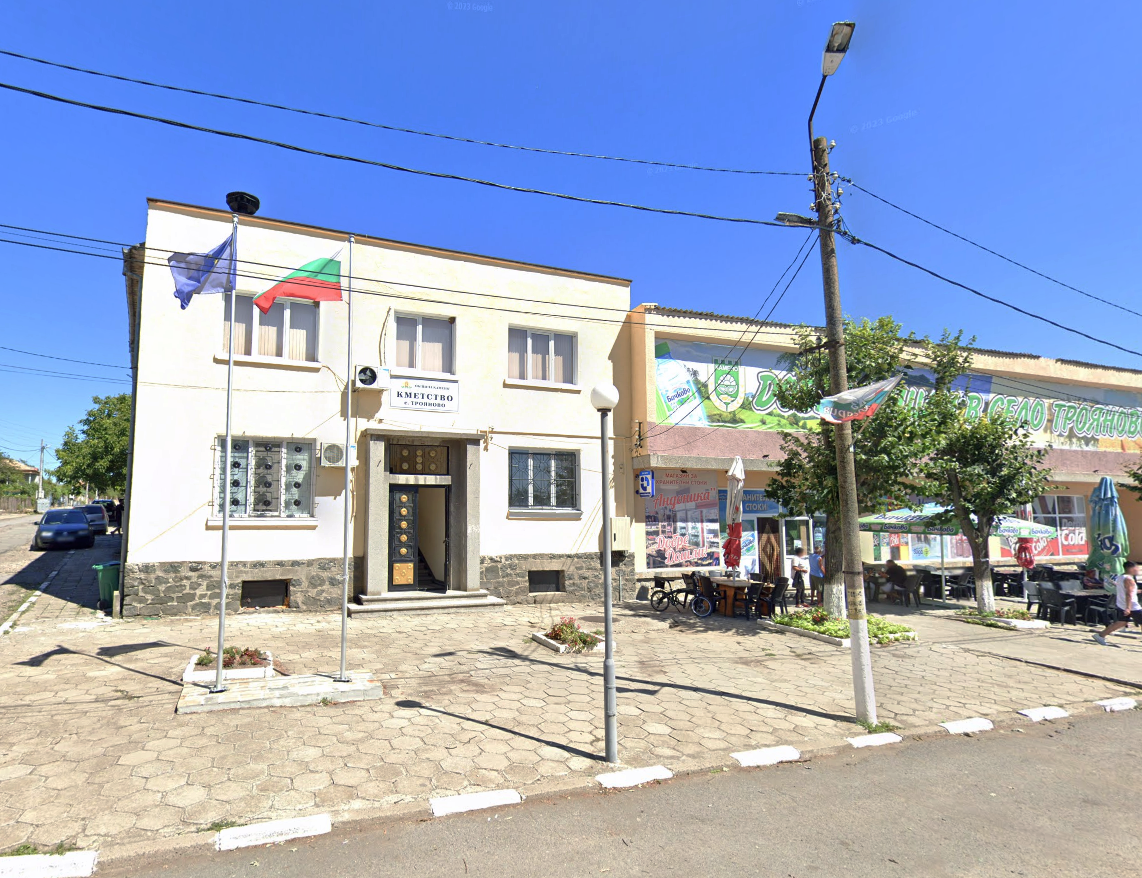
- Village hall

- Location in Bulgaria
- Coordinates: 42.554°N 27.146°E
- Country: Bulgaria
- Province: Burgas Province
- Municipality: Kameno Municipality
- Time zone: UTC+2 (EET)
  - Summer (DST): UTC+3 (EEST)

Troyanovo is a village in the Kameno municipality, of Burgas, in southeast Bulgaria.
