= Drama coal mine =

Mine in Greece

Drama Coal Mine
- Location: Drama, East Macedonia and Thrace, Greece
- Products: Lignite

The Drama Coal Mine is a coal mine in Greece. The mine is located in Drama regional unit in East Macedonia and Thrace. The mine has coal reserves amounting to 1 billion tonnes of lignite, one of the largest lignite reserves in Europe.

== See also ==
- Energy in Greece
