= Camafuca diamond mine =

Diamond mine in Lunda Norte, Angola

Camafuca mine
Location
- Location: Lunda Norte Province, Angola

Production
- Products: diamond

The Camafuca mine is one of the largest diamond mines in Angola and in the world. The mine is located in Lunda Norte Province. The mine has estimated reserves of 23.04 million carats of diamonds and an annual production capacity of 0.2 million carats.
