= Mirovo mine =

Salt mine in Bulgaria

- Location: Veliko Tarnovo Province, Bulgaria
- Products: Sodium chloride

The Mirovo mine is a large salt mine located in eastern Bulgaria in Veliko Tarnovo Province. Mirovo represents one of the largest salt reserves in Bulgaria having estimated reserves of 4,357 million tonnes of NaCl.
