= Unkurtash mine =

Gold mine in Jalal-Abad, Kyrgyzstan

- Location: Jalal-Abad Province, Kyrgyzstan
- Products: Gold
- Company: Gold Fields

The Unkurtash mine is one of the largest gold mines in the Kyrgyzstan and in the world. The mine is located in the west of the country in the Jalal-Abad Province. The mine has estimated reserves of 3 million oz of gold. In 2012 Highland Gold announced that they had been awarded mining permits in these prospects. They aim to further increase their current resource base in hopes of developing a large scale open-pit operation.
