= Awilco LNG =

Norwegian shipping company

- Company type: Allmennaksjeselskap
- Traded as: OSE: ALNG
- Industry: LNG carrier shipping
- Headquarters: Oslo, Norway
- Subsidiaries: Awilco LNG Technical Management AS
- Website: www.awilcolng.com

Awilco LNG is a Norwegian LNG transportation company. The company was listed on Oslo Axess on 6 September 2011.

== Fleet ==
The technical management of the fleet is handled by subsidiary Awilco LNG Technical management AS. As of 2023, Awilco's fleet is composed of two 156,000 m^{3} vessels. In 2023, the company charters its vessels for approximately $120,000 per trading day.

=== Current fleet ===
Name	Year built	Capacity (m^{3})	Operating notes
WilForce	2013	156,007	Tri-fuel diesel electric propulsion; membrane tanks
WilPride	2013	156,007	Tri-fuel diesel electric propulsion; membrane tanks

=== Former fleet ===
Name	Year built	Capacity (m^{3})	Year disposed	Operating notes
WilPower	1983	125,660	2015 (sale)	Steam propulsion; Moss-type tanks
WilEnergy	1983	125,556	2016 (sale)	Steam propulsion; Moss-type tanks
WilGas	1984	125,631	2016 (sale)	Steam propulsion; Moss-type tanks

== Incidents ==
In 2019, the WilForce was involved in a collision off the coast of Singapore. The WilForce collided with the bulker Western Moscow, owned by Ratu Shipping. A court found the bulker primarily liable for the collision, which caused $17.6 million in damages. The company stated that no bunker fuel was spilled and that the LNG tanks were empty at the time.
