= Kodal mine =

Titanium mine in Norway

- Interactive map of Kodal mine
- Location: Vestfold, Norway; 59°13′37″N 10°02′31″E
- Products: Titanium

The Kodal mine is one of the largest titanium mines in Norway. The mine is located in Vestfold. The mine has reserves amounting to 70 million tonnes of ore grading 8% titanium.
