= Scanship =

Norwegian waste management system manufacturer

Scanship AS
- Company type: Aksjeselskap
- Traded as: OSE: SSHIP
- Industry: Industrial machinery
- Founded: 2007
- Headquarters: Tønsberg (Vestfold), Norway
- Website: www.scanship.no

Scanship is a Norwegian company that produces wastewater purification and waste management systems for ferries, cruise ships, disaster relief and merchant shipping.

The company is headquartered in Tønsberg, Norway while the publicly listed holding company which holds all the shares in the company is located in Lysaker.

Scanship has operations in Norway, the United States, Canada, Poland and Italy.

The company started trading on Oslo Axess on April 11, 2014.
