= A238 mine =

Uranium mine in Mauritania

Coordinates: 24°53′N 11°17′W

- Interactive map of A238 mine
- Location: Mauritania
- Products: uranium

The A238 mine is a large open pit mine located in the western part of Mauritania. A238 represents one of the largest uranium reserves in Mauritania having estimated reserves of 45 million tonnes of ore grading 0.02% uranium.
