= Rødsand mine =

Titanium mine in Norway

- Interactive map of Rødsand mine
- Location: Møre og Romsdal, Norway; 62°47′56″N 8°10′11″E
- Products: Titanium

The Rødsand mine is one of the largest titanium mines in Norway. The mine is located in Møre og Romsdal. The mine has reserves amounting to 131 million tonnes of ore grading 4% titanium.
