= Talas mine =

Gold mine in Talas, Kyrgyzstan

- Location: Talas Province, Kyrgyzstan
- Products: Gold
- Company: Gold Fields

The Talas mine is one of the largest gold mines in the Kyrgyzstan and in the world. The mine is located in the north-west of the country in the Talas Province. The mine has estimated reserves of 3.7 million oz of gold.
