= Marinova dolostone quarry =

Quarry in Estonia

Coordinates: 57°44′21″N 27°31′18″E

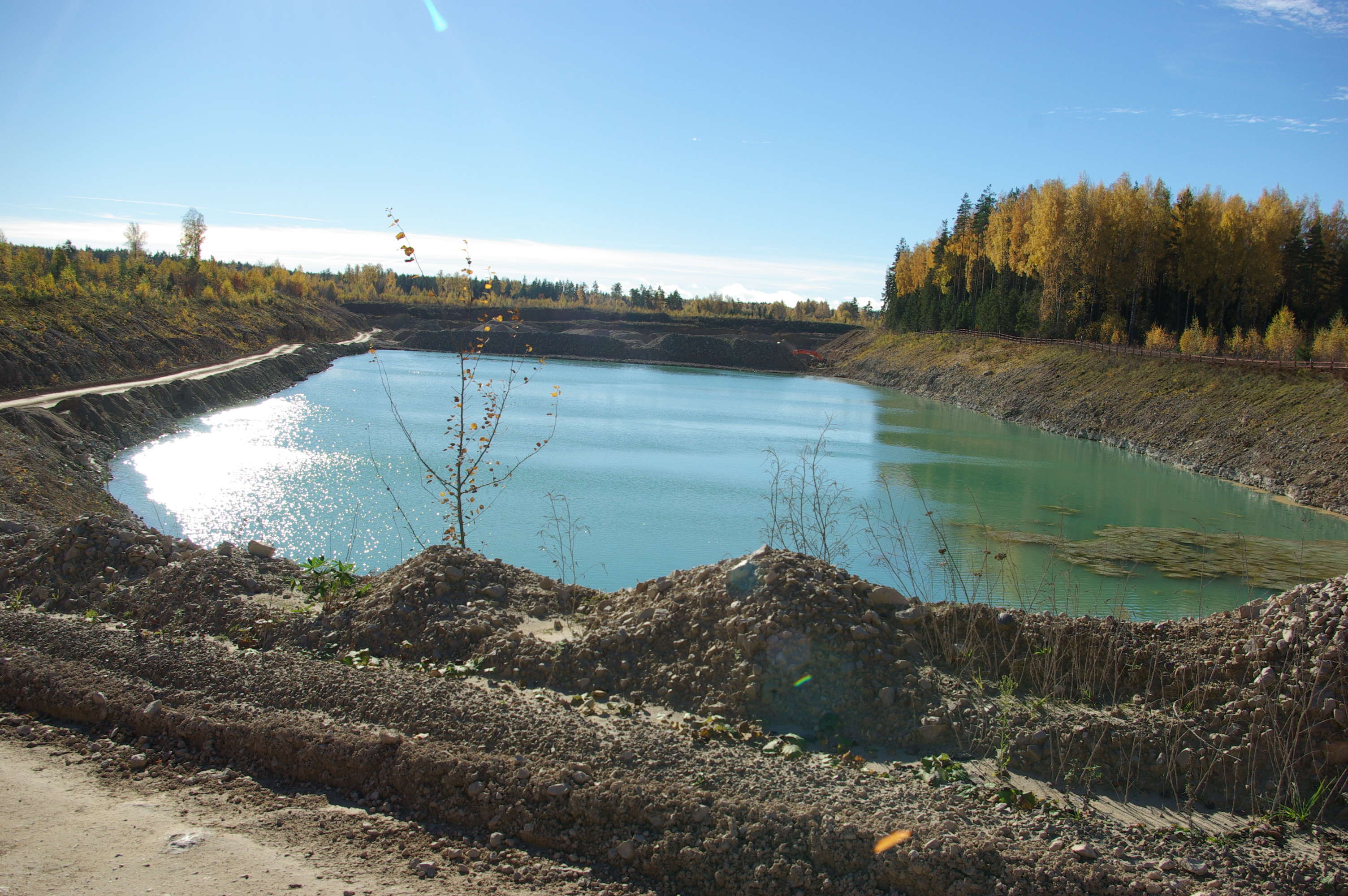
Marinova dolostone quarry

Marinova dolostone quarry is a quarry in a mineral deposit situated on a dolostone deposit of Pskov formation with a thickness of about ten metres in Võru County, Meremäe rural municipality in Estonia. Marinova quarry is mining and crushing construction dolomite.

The area contains mostly Upper Devonian series clastic rocks. Carbonate rocks in south-east Estonia and carbonate rock outcrops are very rare in that area. The outcrops can be seen in Mõniste parish on the bank outcrops of Peetri River and on a small bench north of Meremäe village. The rock outcrops from the same formation are situated in Meremäe rural municipality, in the old limestone quarry of Tiirhanna and Marinova dolostone quarry. According to the geological studies of Marinova mineral deposit, the upper half of the roughly ten metre thick dolostone deposit of Pskov formation is heavily crushed and karstified. The dolostone bed mined in the quarry is up to ten metres thick, half of which is above groundwater level, half of it below. The groundwater is not pumped out of the quarry and the rock below groundwater is mined by underwater explosion. The dolostone above groundwater level is characterised by strong crushing and the crumbling of the upper part of the deposit. Dolostone settled below groundwater level is less crushed.

There are karst caves roughly one metre high and wide in the limestone deposit. In the southern end of the quarry, one can observe many local bends in the walls of the quarry, which can be associated with the sag of rock layers above the karst caves. The nearby Belka River valley has aided the water running between the cracked rocks and therefore, the formation of extensive karst phenomena. There are numerous springs on the west slope of the valley that feed from the water traversing Marinova quarry dolostones. At the same time, it is not quite certain as to why the upper part of dolostones is that much cracked in the Marinova quarry area. The tectonic processes could have had a crushing influence on the open dolostones in the Marinova quarry.
