= Selvåg mine =

Titanium mine in Norway

- Interactive map of Selvåg mine
- Location: Nordland, Norway; 68°44′25″N 14°32′11″E
- Products: Titanium

The Selvåg mine is a titanium mine in Norway. The mine is located in Kobbvågfjellet, Langøya, Nordland and has reserves amounting to 44 million tonnes of ore grading 2.5% titanium.
