= Målviken mine =

Tungsten mine in Norway

Coordinates: 65°53′03″N 13°15′21″E

- Location: Nordland, Norway
- Products: Tungsten

The Målviken mine is a large open pit mine located near Mosjøen in the northern part of Norway in Nordland. Målviken represents one of the largest tungsten reserves in Norway having estimated reserves of 2.51 million tonnes of ore grading 0.9% tungsten.
