= Madaouéla mine =

Uranium mine in Agadez Region, Niger

- Location: Agadez Region, Niger
- Products: uranium

The Madaouéla mine is a large mine located in the northern part of Niger in Agadez Region. Madaouéla represents one of the largest uranium reserves in Niger having estimated reserves of 39.4 million tonnes of ore grading 0.1% uranium.
