= Umm Naggat mine =

Tantalum mine in South Sinai, Egypt

- Location: South Sinai Governorate, Egypt
- Products: Tantalum

The Umm Naggat mine is a large mine located in the northern part of Egypt in South Sinai Governorate. Umm Naggat represents one of the largest tantalum reserves in Egypt having estimated reserves of 25 million tonnes of ore grading 0.015% tantalum.
