= Adrar Emoles mine =

Uranium mine in Agadez Region, Niger

- Location: Agadez Region, Niger
- Products: uranium

The Adrar Emoles mine is a large mine located in the northern part of Niger in Agadez Region. Adrar Emoles represents one of the largest uranium reserves in Niger having estimated reserves of 27.7 million tonnes of ore grading 0.07% uranium.
