= El Nuweiba mine =

Tantalum mine in Egypt

- Location: South Sinai Governorate, Egypt
- Products: Tantalum

The El Nuweiba mine is a large mine located in the northern part of Egypt in South Sinai Governorate. El Nuweiba represents one of the largest tantalum reserves in Egypt having estimated reserves of 114.7 million tonnes of ore grading 0.016% tantalum.
