= Abu Dabab mine =

Tantalum mine in Egypt

- Location within Egypt
- Location: Red Sea Governorate, Egypt; 25.3366°N 34.6868°E
- Products: Tantalum
- Company
- Type: Private company

The Abu Dabab mine is a large proposed mine located in the eastern part of Egypt in Red Sea Governorate. Abu Dabab represents one of the largest tantalum reserves in Egypt having estimated reserves of 39.9 million tonnes of ore grading 0.025% tantalum.

In 2002, the mine was to be developed by Tantalum International Ltd., a 50-50 joint venture between Australia-based company Gippsland and the Egyptian state owned Egyptian Company for Mineral Resources into the world's largest tantalum mine. However, the project was halted in 2015 and the company's exploration license was revoked. In 2019, Gippsland (which had rebranded as the Esports company Emerge Gaming Ltd.) sued the Egyptian government in the International Centre for Settlement of Investment Disputes. The parties settled in 2021.
