= Abu Tartur mine =

Phosphate mine in Egypt

- Location within Egypt
- Location: New Valley Governorate, Egypt; 25.37892°N 30.08777°E
- Products: Phosphates

The Abu Tartur mine is a large proposed mine located in New Valley Governorate. Abu Tartur represents one of the largest phosphates reserve in Egypt having estimated reserves of 980 million tonnes of ore grading 30% P_{2}O_{5}.

As of 2019, the Egyptian minister Tarek El-Molla signed agreements with China State Construction Engineering and the Guizhou state-owned phosphate producer the Wengfu Group to develop the mine.
