= El Maghara mine =

Coal mine in North Sinai, Egypt

- Location within Egypt
- Location: North Sinai, Egypt; 30°41′05″N 33°19′10″E
- Products: Coal
- Opened: 1964
- Company: Egyptian General Authority for Mineral Resources

The El Maghara mine is an underground coal mine in Egypt's Sinai peninsula. Opened in 1964, the mine produces low-rank bituminous coal. Located about 250 km northeast of Cairo, it is the only coal mine in Egypt. Operations were approved to resume in 2014, with reserves estimated at 21 million tons of coal.

The mine is run by the state-owned Egyptian General Authority for Mineral Resources.
