= List of collieries in Derbyshire =

There were 68 collieries in the Derbyshire coalfield when the British coal industry was nationalised in 1947. By 1994 they were all closed.

The last six to close, following the miners' strikes of 1984, were Arkwright, Cadley Hill, Creswell, Shirebrook, Bolsover and finally Markham in 1994. Bolsover, Markham and Shirebrook had been three of the county's largest coal mines.

Colliery Name	Town	Year of opening	Year of closure	Notes	Photo
Alfreton	Alfreton	1895	1968		
Arkwright	Arkwright Town	1899	1988		
Avenue Shaft	Wingerworth	1950	1950		
Bentinck	Kirkby-in-Ashfield	1895	1988 merged	Combined with Annesley (Nottinghamshire)	
Blackwell A Winning	Alfreton	1861	1969		
Blackwell B Winning	Alfreton	1880	1964		
Bolsover	Bolsover	1890	1993		
Bond's Main	Temple Normanton	1896	1949		
Bretby	Newhall	1875	1962		
Brittain Pit	Ripley	1918	1946		
Brookhill	Pinxton	1908	1968 merged	Combined with Bentinck	
Butterley Drift	Denby	1945	1947		
Cadley Hill	Swadlincote	1869	1988		
Church Gresley	Church Gresley	1855	1967 merged	Combined with Cadley Hill	
Coppice	Shipley	1874	1966		
Coppice No.2	Shipley	1900	1966		
Coppice No.3	Shipley	1930	1966		
Cotes Park	Alfreton	1854	1963		
Creswell	Creswell	1895	1991		
Denby	Denby	1854	1968		
Denby Hall	Denby	1875	1967 merged	Combined with Denby	
Field Shaft	Shipley	1947	1950		
Ford's	Denby	1950	1950		
Glapwell	Glapwell	1885	1974		
Granville No.1	Swadlincote	1850	1967 merged	Combined with Rawdon (Leicestershire)	
Granville No.2	Swadlincote	1854	1967 merged	Combined with Rawdon (Leicestershire)	
Grassmoor	Temple Normanton	1854	1950 merged	Combined with Williamthorpe	
High Moor	Killamarsh	1957	1989		
Holmewood	Holmewood	1874	1968		
Ireland	Staveley	1875	1986		
Langton	Alfreton	1842	1967 merged	Combined with Kirkby	
Langwith	Langwith	1876	1978		
Manners	Ilkeston	1874	1949		
Mapperley	Stanley Common	1870	1965		
Markham	Staveley	1881	1994	In 1938 79 miners were killed in the Markham Colliery disaster.	
Markham No.1	Staveley	1881	1967 merged	Combined with Markham	
Markham No.2	Staveley	1887	1967 merged	Combined with Markham	
Markham No.4	Staveley	1930	1967 merged	Combined with Markham	
Morton	Morton	1866	1965		
Netherseal	Netherseal	1870	1947		
New Langley	Heanor	1859	1960 merged	Combined with Ormonde	
Ormonde	Loscoe	1905	1970		
Oxcroft	Clowne	1900	1974		
Park House	Clay Cross	1880	1962		
Pilsley	Pilsley	1867	1957		
Pinxton	Pinxton	1938	1950		
Pleasley	Pleasley	1871	1984		
Plymouth No.2	Pinxton	1940	1950		
Ramcroft	Heath	1915	1966		
Renishaw Park	Eckington	1859	1989		
Reservoir Pit	Overseal	1875	1948		
Ripley	Ripley	1846	1949 merged	Combined with Denby Hall	
Shirebrook	Shirebrook	1896	1993		
Shirland	Shirland	1864	1965		
Southgate	Clowne	1877	1929		
South Normanton	South Normanton	1895	1951		
Stanhope Bretby	Newhall	1960	1966		
Stanley	Stanley	1895	1961		
Swadlincote	Swadlincote	1854	1965		
Swanwick	Alfreton	1854	1968		
Thorntree Drift	Newhall	1930	1947		
Westthorpe	Killamarsh	1923	1984		
Whitwell	Whitwell	1890	1986		
Williamthorpe	Temple Normanton	1854	1970		
Wingfield Manor	Oakerthorpe	1908	1963 merged	Combined with Swanwick	
Woodside No.1	Shipley	1875	1966		
Woodside No.2	Shipley	1900	1960		
Woodside No.3	Shipley	1920	1961 merged	Combined with Coppice	
Woolley Moor	Stretton	1955	1955		

In 1880 there were 235 coal mines recorded in Derbyshire.

== See also ==
- List of coal mines in the United Kingdom
