= Tabuaço mine =

Tungsten mine in Portugal

- Location: Norte Region, Portugal
- Products: Tungsten

The Tabuaço mine is a large open pit mine located in the eastern part of Portugal in Norte Region. Tabuaço represents one of the largest tungsten reserves in Portugal having estimated reserves of 2.72 million tonnes of ore grading 0.57% tungsten.
