= List of iron mines in the United States =

The following is an incomplete list of iron mines in the United States. For more information, see Iron mining in the United States.

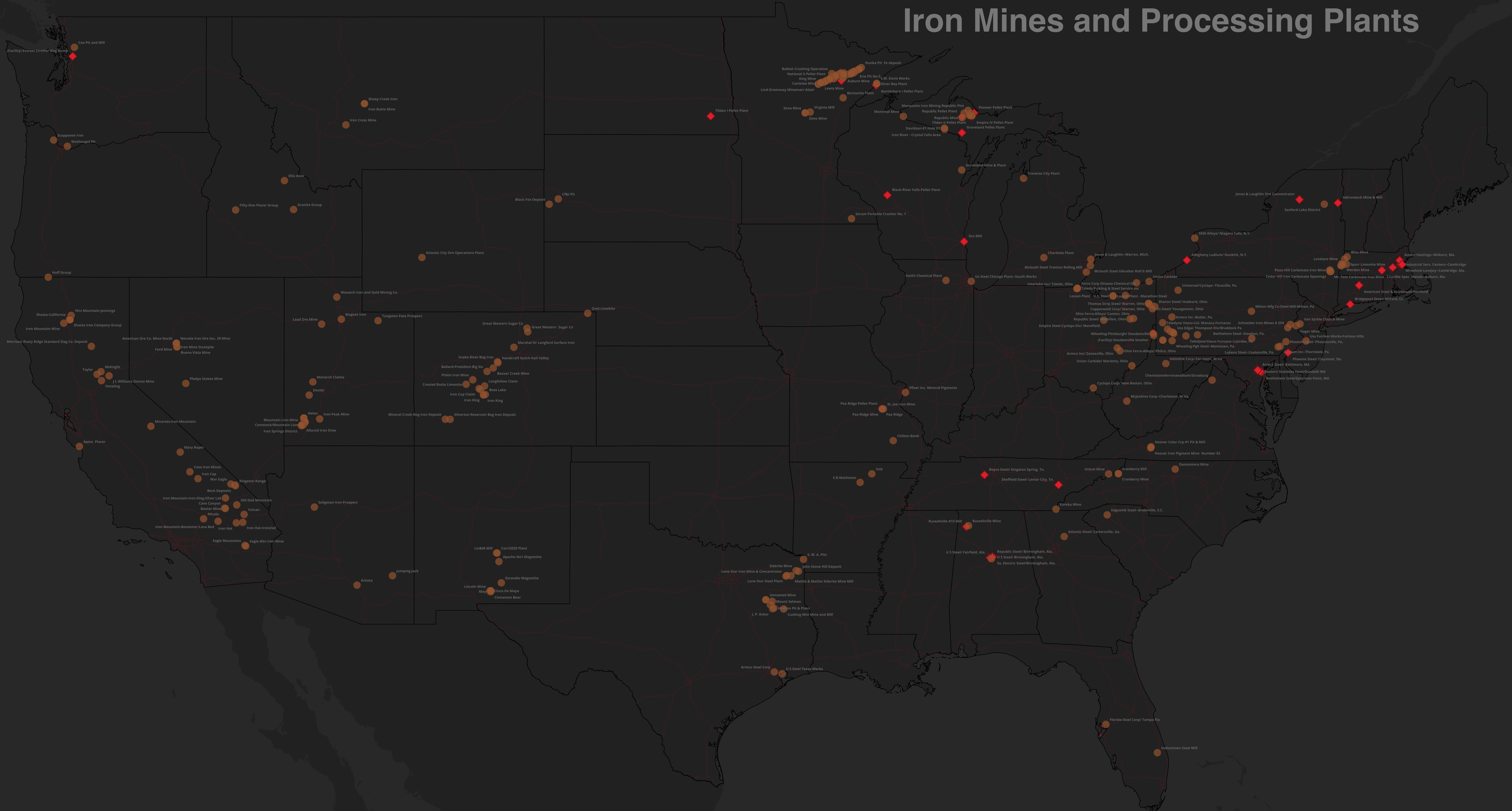
Iron mines and processing plants

== Active mines ==
- Hull–Rust–Mahoning Open Pit Iron Mine in Hibbing in St. Louis County, Minnesota (taconite)
- Keetac Mine near Keewatin in Itasca County, Minnesota (taconite)
- Minntac Mine near the city of Mountain Iron in St. Louis County, Minnesota (taconite)

== Inactive mines ==
- Cliffs Shaft Mine in Ishpeming in Marquette County, Michigan (mining ended 1967, museum opened 1999)
- Hibernia mines in and around Rockaway Township in Morris County, New Jersey (mining ceased 1916, closed by 1989)
- Iron Mountain District near Cedar City in Iron County, Utah (inactive, still maintained)
- Iron Mountain Mine, aka Richmond Mine at Iron Mountain near Redding in Shasta County, California (mining ceased 1963, a federal Superfund site since 1983)
- Jackson Mine in Negaunee in Marquette County, Michigan (closed 1924)
- Minorca Mine along with Elba and Corsica mines, in the ghost town of Elcor near Gilbert in St. Louis County, Minnesota (closed 1954)
- Milford Mine in Wolford Township in Crow Wing County, Minnesota (site of Milford Mine Disaster in 1924, closed 1932)
- Mountain Iron Mine in the city of Mountain Iron in St. Louis County, Minnesota (mining ceased 1956)
- Pioneer Mine in Ely in St. Louis County, Minnesota (closed 1967)
- Pyne Mine near Bessemer in Jefferson County, Alabama (closed 1971)
- Rouchleau Mine bordering Virginia in St. Louis County, Minnesota (mining ended 1977, now a water source for Virginia, MN)
- Sloss Mines in southwestern Jefferson County, Alabama (active until 1960s, currently a recreational park)
- Soudan Underground Mine on the south shore of Lake Vermilion in Breitung Township in St. Louis County, Minnesota (active until 1962, now a state and recreational park)
- Wenonah, Alabama, site of multiple mining camps on the Red Mountain ridge south of Birmingham in Jefferson County, Alabama, the last closed in 1971.

== See also ==
- Iron mining in the United States
