= Infratek =

Infratek is a system for removing ice from aircraft using heat (infrared radiation).

Infrared panels powered by natural gas are installed inside a big hangar-like tent with openings in both ends. When the aircraft is inside, the infrared rays will melt the ice off its wings and body. The advantage is that no chemical deicing fluids such as glycol, which is harmful to the environment and very expensive, need to be used. A minor drawback might be that natural gas adds to CO_{2} pollution.

Infratek systems exist at New York's JFK and Newark airports. It was also set up at Oslo Airport, Gardermoen in January 2006, but as of February 2007 the system was still unsuccessful, due to the cold Norwegian winter climate.
