= Engebøfjell mine =

Titanium mine in Norway

Coordinates: 61°29′29″N 5°25′40″E

- Location: Sogn og Fjordane, Norway
- Products: Titanium

The Engebøfjell mine is one of the largest titanium mines in Norway. The mine is located in Sogn og Fjordane. The mine has reserves amounting to 400 million tonnes of ore grading 4% titanium.
