= List of mines in Alberta =

List of mines in Alberta, Canada.

Mine	Major commodities	Coordinates	Associated town	Owner	Dates	Comments	References
Atlas Coal Mine	Coal	Latitude: 51.4573° N Longitude: 112.7455° W	East Coulee				
Hillcrest Mine	Coal	Latitude: 49.7764° N Longitude: 114.0395° W	Hillcrest		?-1939	Location of Canada's worst coal mining disaster.	
Whitewood mine	Coal	Latitude: 50.2967° N Longitude: 102.2319° W		TransAlta	1962-2010		
