= Kalesay mine =

Beryllium mine in Kyrgyzstan

- Location: Issyk Kul Province, Kyrgyzstan
- Products: Beryllium

The Kalesay mine is one of the largest beryllium mines in Kyrgyzstan. The mine is located in Issyk Kul Province. The mine has reserves amounting to 9.24 million tonnes of ore grading 0.13% beryllium.
