= List of coal mines in the United Kingdom =

This is a list of coal mines in the United Kingdom, sorted between those operating in the 21st century and those closed earlier.

The last operating deep coal mine in the United Kingdom, Kellingley colliery in North Yorkshire, closed in December 2015. After 2015, most continuing coal mines were collieries owned by freeminers, or open pit mines of which there were 26 in 2014. However, since the closure of Ffos-y-fran in November 2023, no opencast coal mine operates, and opencast production is zero according to the UK Coal Authority. The largest mine is Aberpergwm, which is a drift mine. Aberpergwm (and other small scale underground mines) produced around 106,000 tonnes in 2024 while opencast production was zero (except for 800 tonnes in January, 2024).

== 21st century ==
These coal mines closed in the 21st century or still operate.

Mine	Owner	Region	Production (tonnes)^{[a]}	Manpower^{[a]}	Status
Bradley Surface Mine	Banks Group	County Durham	340,000	<30 (2018)	Closed August 2020
Clipstone Colliery	RJB Mining	Nottinghamshire	?	1,300 (?)	Closed 2003
Daw Mill	UK Coal	West Midlands	3.25 million (2008)	683 (2008)	Closed 7 March 2013
Hatfield Colliery	Hatfield Colliery Ltd	Yorkshire	704,740 (2011)	400 (2011)	Closed July 2015
Hill Top Colliery	Grimebridge Colliery Company Ltd	Lancashire	?	3 (2011)	Closed, 2014
Kellingley Colliery	UK Coal Operations Ltd	Yorkshire	2,276,434 (2011)	695 (2011)	Closed 18 December 2015
Maltby Main Colliery	UK Coal	Yorkshire	?	<400	Closed April 2013
Thoresby Colliery	UK Coal Operations Ltd	Nottinghamshire	1,283,346 (2011)	613 (2011)	Closed July 2015
Hartington	?	Derbyshire	87,000	?	Closed September, 2020
Danygraig 4 drift mine	Three D's Mining Limited	Wales	?	?	Closed March 2021
Ffos-y-fran Land Reclamation Scheme	Merthyr Tydfil	South Wales	1,000,000 (at peak)	?	Closed November 2023
Aberpergwm drift mine	Energybuild Ltd	Wales	<100,000	160 (2021)	Operating
Ayle Colliery (Quarry Drift)	Ayle Colliery Company Ltd	Cumbria	1,000	?	Operating in Feb 2020
Hopewell Colliery	Rich Daniels (Freeminer)	Forest of Dean	?	~1 (2018)	Operating
Wallsend Colliery & Morse's Level	Mike Howells (Freeminer)	Forest of Dean	?	?	Operating
Monument Colliery	Ray Ashly, Richard Daniels & Neil Jones (Freeminers)	Forest of Dean	250 (2011)	3 (2011)	One of the only freemines in Forest of Dean operating as of 2002

^{a} For the year given.

== Earlier ==
These coal mines closed before the 21st century.

Mine	Traditional county	Opened	Closed	Peak manpower^{[a]}	Notes
North East England
Boldon Colliery	County Durham	1866	1982	(?)	
Castle Eden colliery	County Durham	1842	1959	891 (1880s)	
Dawdon Colliery	County Durham	5 October 1907	25 July 1991	3,798 (1930)	
Newbottle Colliery	County Durham	1774	1956	1,199 (1921)	
Shincliffe colliery	County Durham	1839	1875	(?)	
East Midlands and Yorkshire
Asfordby Colliery	Leicestershire	1991	1997	490	Last deep coal mine to be sunk in England.
Babbington Colliery	Nottinghamshire	1841	1986		
Bagworth Colliery	Leicestershire	1832	1991		
Hucknall No.1 Colliery	Nottinghamshire	1861	1943		
Hucknall No.2 Colliery	Nottinghamshire	1865	1986		
Ollerton Colliery	Nottinghamshire	1920s	1994		
Silverwood Colliery	Yorkshire	1900	1994		
North West and North Staffordshire
Ellerbeck Colliery	Lancashire	1876	1965	(?)	
Golborne Colliery	Lancashire	1860s	1989	(?)	Site of explosion (1979) in which 10 workers died.
Silverdale Colliery	Staffordshire	(?)	1998	(?)	Last active coal mine in Staffordshire.
South East England
Snowdown Colliery	Kent	1907	1987		
Betteshanger Colliery	Kent	1927	1989		
Tilmanstone Colliery	Kent	1906	1986		
Chislet Colliery	Kent	1914	1969		

Ww^{a} With given year of peak.

== See also ==
- List of collieries in Derbyshire
- List of collieries in Yorkshire (1984–2015)
- Coal mining in the United Kingdom
