= Mobilong diamond mine =

Diamond mine in Yokadouma, East Region, Cameroon

Mobilong mine
- Location: Yokadouma, East Region, Cameroon
- Products: diamond

The Mobilong mine is a diamond deposit in the East Region of Cameroon.

In December 2010, the resource was reported to the Korean stock exchange as being 736 million carats. In 2013, the resource was estimated to have reserves of 416 million carats of diamonds and an annual production capacity of 0.8 million carats. It was owned by C&K Mining, a joint venture between Cameroon and the South Korean state. The adjustment led to legal action in Korea relating to manipulating the stock market. In 2014, a majority interest was sold to a Chinese-American investor.

The deposit was reported to be under revaluation in 2016 to determine exactly what is in it.

Mobilong appears to be one of many failed mining ventures in Cameroon. It got further than most by having a camp and some mining equipment on site.
