= Locarno Mine =

Mine in California, United States

Coordinates: 35°23′41″N 118°19′37″W

The Locarno Mine is situated in Kern County, California, USA. Gold and tungsten have been mined there. It was used from 1924 to 1942.
