= Engebø mine =

Titanium mine in Norway

- Interactive map of Engebø mine
- Location: Sogn og Fjordane, Norway; 61°29′19″N 5°26′35″E
- Products: Titanium
- Company: Nordic Mining

The Engebø mine is one of the largest titanium mines in Norway. The mine is located in Sogn og Fjordane. The mine has reserves amounting to 154 million tonnes of ore grading 3.8% titanium.
