= Rocksource =

Petroleum company

Rocksource ASA
- Company type: Public (OSE: RGT)
- Industry: Oil and gas
- Headquarters: Bergen, Norway
- Key people: Trygve Pedersen (CEO); Dag Dvergsten (Chairman)
- Products: Geophysical services
- Revenue: NOK 10,9 million (2005)
- Net income: NOK 47,4 million (2005)
- Number of employees: 40 (Dec 2007)

Rocksource was a technology-based exploration and production petroleum company listed on the Oslo Stock Exchange. The company was established as a partnership between Norwegian entrepreneurs, oil industry professionals and academics, Jonny Hesthammer and John Howell from the University of Bergen. The company focused on two areas. For exploration the company developed algorithms for the processing of Controlled Source Electromagnetic (CSEM) data which were used as part of an integrated exploration process. Secondly the company successfully exported "North Sea style" reservoir management techniques to the highly conservative onshore gas fields of east Texas where it bought old oil and gas fields and revitalized them.

Rocksource built up a portfolio of exploration acreage that was suitable for de-risking using CSEM. The first tranche of wells were drilled in 2011 with mixed results, including a marginal discovery in the Barents Sea. The results were perceived negatively by investors and the share price fell sharply. The subsequent discovery of the Pil and Bue fields in 2014 saw the company as successful but underfunded. This led to the company being delisted and purchased by Hitech Vision. Rocksources was combined with other Hitech companies to create Var Energi.
