= Kameno Municipality =

Coordinates: 42.5670°N 27.3000°E

Kameno Municipality Община Камено
- Municipality (Obshtina)
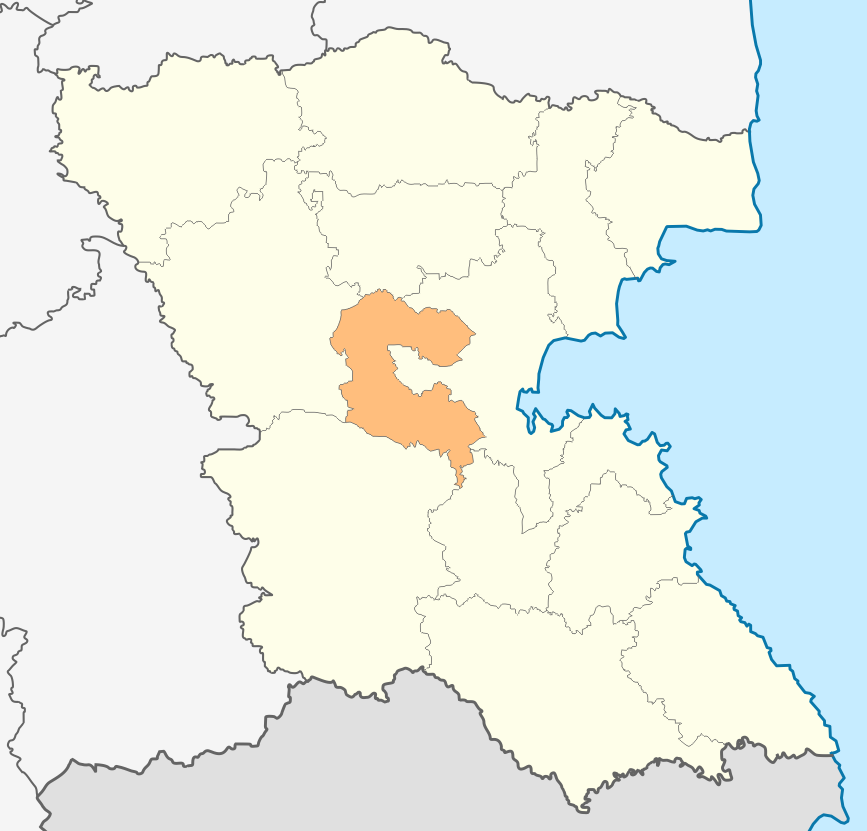
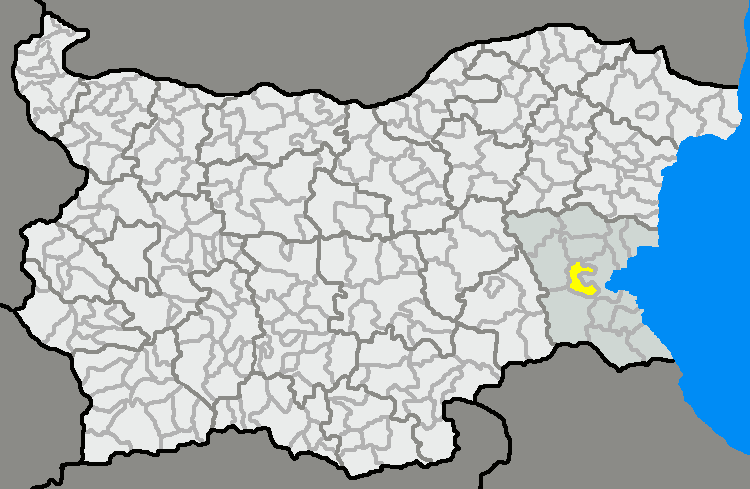
- Location in Burgas province Location on map of Bulgaria
- Country: Bulgaria
- Province (Oblast): Burgas
- Seat: Kameno

Area
  - Total: 354.95 km^{2} (137.05 sq mi)

Population (2011)
  - Total: 10,393
  - Density: 29.280/km^{2} (75.835/sq mi)
- Time zone: UTC+2 (EET)
  - Summer (DST): UTC+3 (EEST)
- Website: www.kameno.bg

Kameno Municipality (Bulgarian: Община Камено, Obshtina Kameno) is a municipality in Burgas Province, Bulgaria. It includes the towns of Kameno and a number of villages.

== Demographics ==
=== Religion ===
According to the latest Bulgarian census of 2011, the religious composition, among those who answered the optional question on religious identification, was the following:

Religious composition of Kameno Municipality
Orthodox Christianity	82.6%
Catholicism	0.5%
Protestantism	0.9%
Islam	2.6%
No religion	5.0%
Prefer not to answer, others and aindefinable	8.4%
