= Tinkham =

Tinkham is a surname. Notable people with the surname include:

- Ernest Robert Tinkham (1904–1987), American entomologist
- Eugene M. Tinkham (1842–1909), American Civil War soldier
- Frank L. Tinkham (1884–1963), American college football and basketball coach
- George Henry Tinkham (1849–1945), American historian on California, writer
- George H. Tinkham (1870–1956), American politician
- Hugh Tinkham (born 1946), Canadian politician
- Michael Tinkham (1928–2010), American physicist
- Richard Tinkham (1932–2018), American basketball executive
- Stan Tinkham (1931–2019), American swimmer and swimming coach
- Lieutenant Abiel W. Tinkham (1824–1871), American railroad surveyor. The two mountains below were both named after him.

== See also ==
- Tinkham Mountain, mountain in the Lewis Range, Montana, United States
- Tinkham Peak, a mountain in the Cascade Range, Washington, United States
