= Abiel Peak =

Mountain in Washington (state), United States

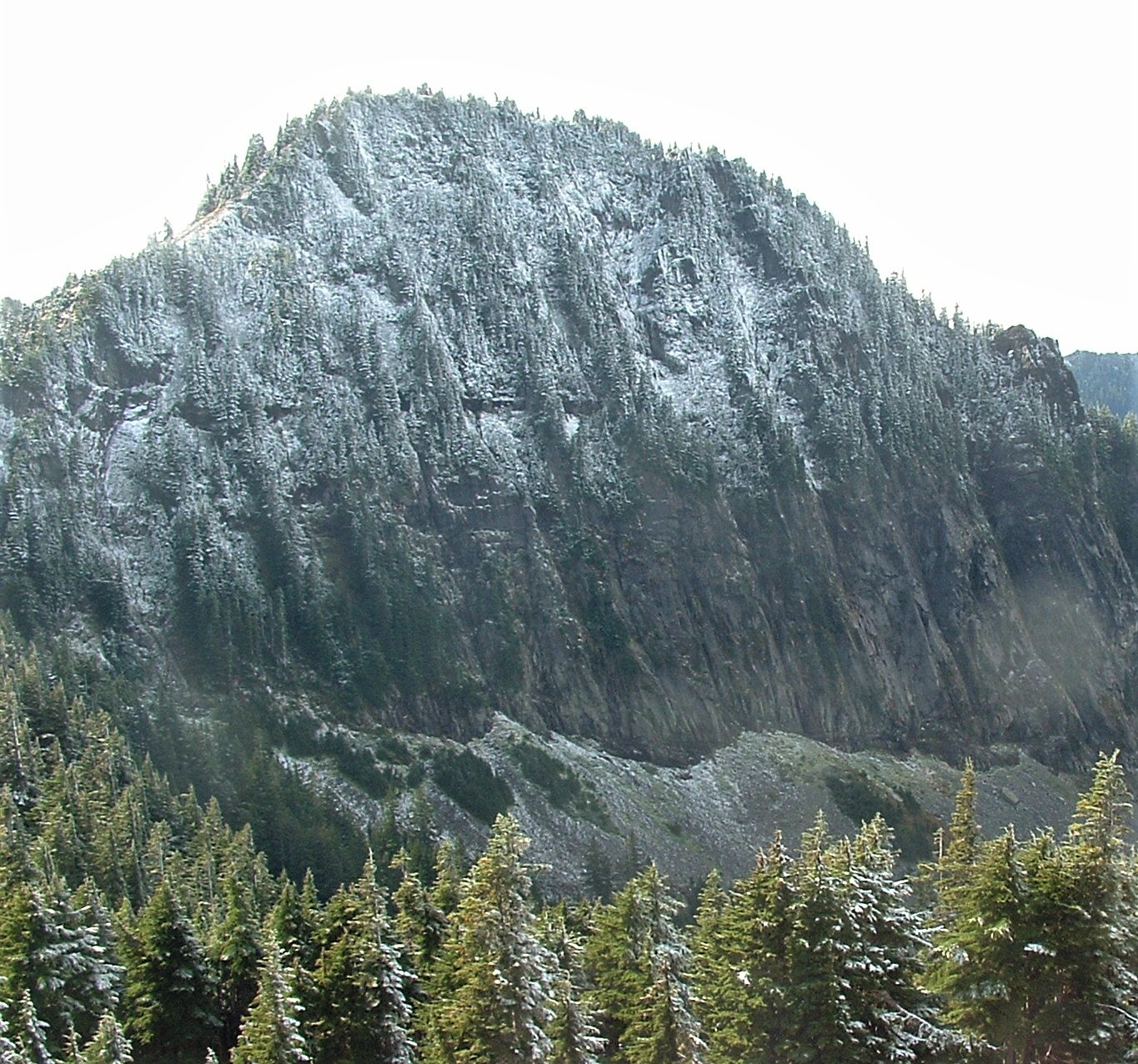
- North aspect

Highest point
- Elevation: 5,365 ft (1,635 m)
- Prominence: 445 ft (136 m)
- Parent peak: Silver Peak (5,605 ft)
- Isolation: 0.71 mi (1.14 km)
- Coordinates: 47°21′07″N 121°28′09″W

Naming
- Etymology: Abiel W. Tinkham

Geography
- Location within Washington (state) Location within the United States
- Interactive map of Abiel Peak
- Location: King County; Washington state, U.S.
- Parent range: Cascade Range
- Topo map: USGS Lost Lake

Climbing
- Easiest route: class 1+ hiking

Abiel Peak is a 5,365 ft (1,640 m) mountain summit located in eastern King County of Washington state. It is set 1,000 feet west of the crest of the Cascade Range, on land managed by Mount Baker-Snoqualmie National Forest. Abiel Peak is situated six miles south-southwest of Snoqualmie Pass, and neighbors include Silver Peak, three-quarters mile to the north-northeast, Tinkham Peak three-quarters mile to the east, and Humpback Mountain two miles to the northwest. Precipitation runoff from the south side of the mountain drains into headwaters of Tinkham Creek which is a tributary of the North Fork Cedar River, whereas the north side of the mountain drains into Annette Lake, thence the South Fork Snoqualmie River via Humpback Creek. Topographic relief is significant as the north aspect rises 1,860 feet (570 meters) above Annette Lake in one-half mile.

== Etymology ==
This geographic landform was named by The Mountaineers and has been officially adopted by the U.S. Board on Geographic Names to honor Lieutenant Abiel W. Tinkham. He worked as a railroad surveyor when he explored the Snoqualmie Pass area in 1853 and 1854. He is also the namesake of nearby Tinkham Peak, and Tinkham Mountain in Glacier National Park, Montana.

== Climate ==
Abiel Peak is located in the marine west coast climate zone of western North America. Most weather fronts originate in the Pacific Ocean, and travel northeast toward the Cascade Mountains. As fronts approach, they are forced upward by the peaks of the Cascade Range, causing them to drop their moisture in the form of rain or snowfall onto the Cascades (Orographic lift). As a result, the west side of the Cascades experiences high precipitation, especially during the winter months in the form of snowfall. Because of maritime influence, snow tends to be wet and heavy, resulting in high avalanche danger. During winter months, weather is usually cloudy, but, due to high pressure systems over the Pacific Ocean that intensify during summer months, there is often little or no cloud cover during the summer. The months July through September offer the most favorable weather for viewing or climbing this peak.

== Gallery ==
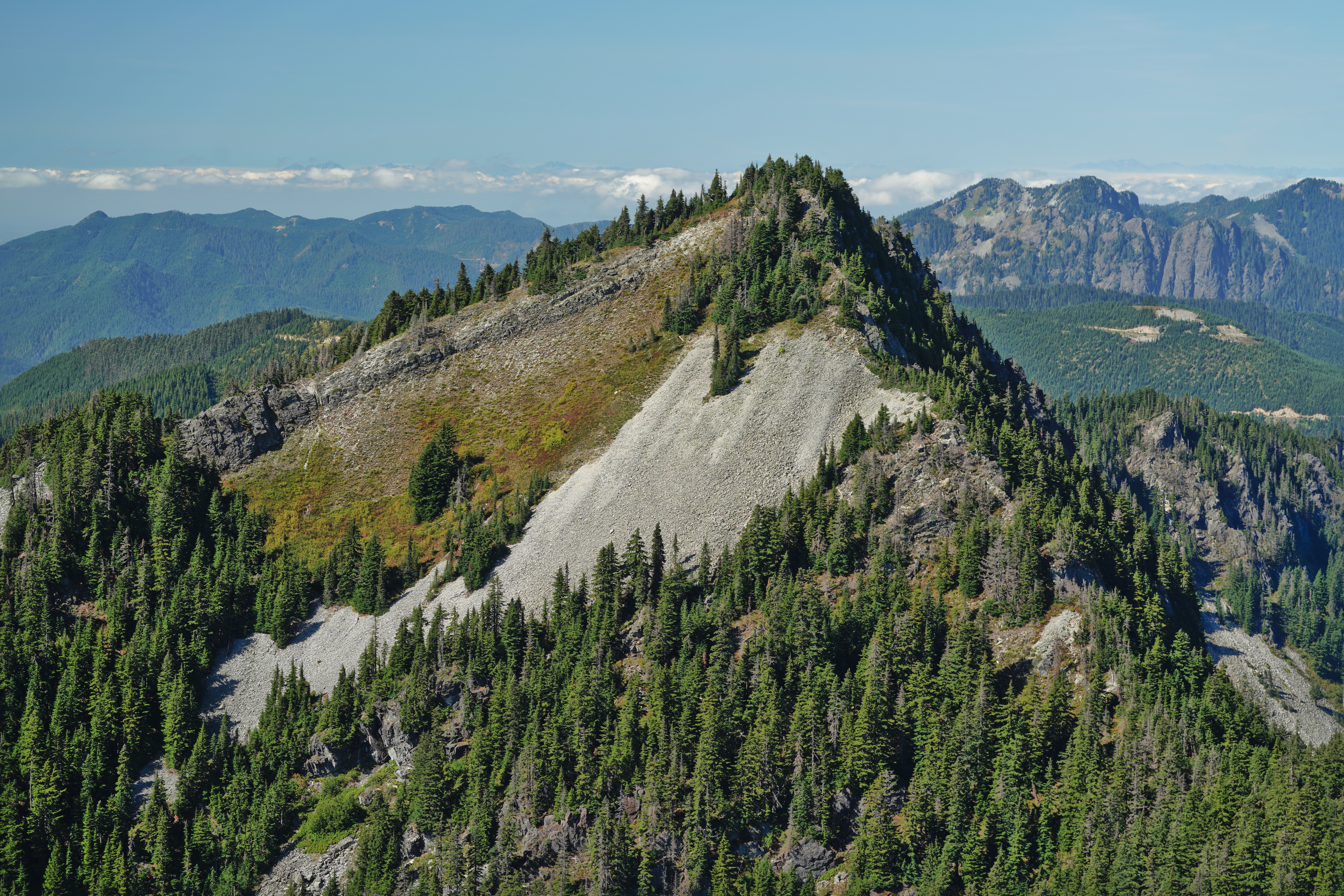
East aspect of Abiel Peak viewed from Tinkham Peak

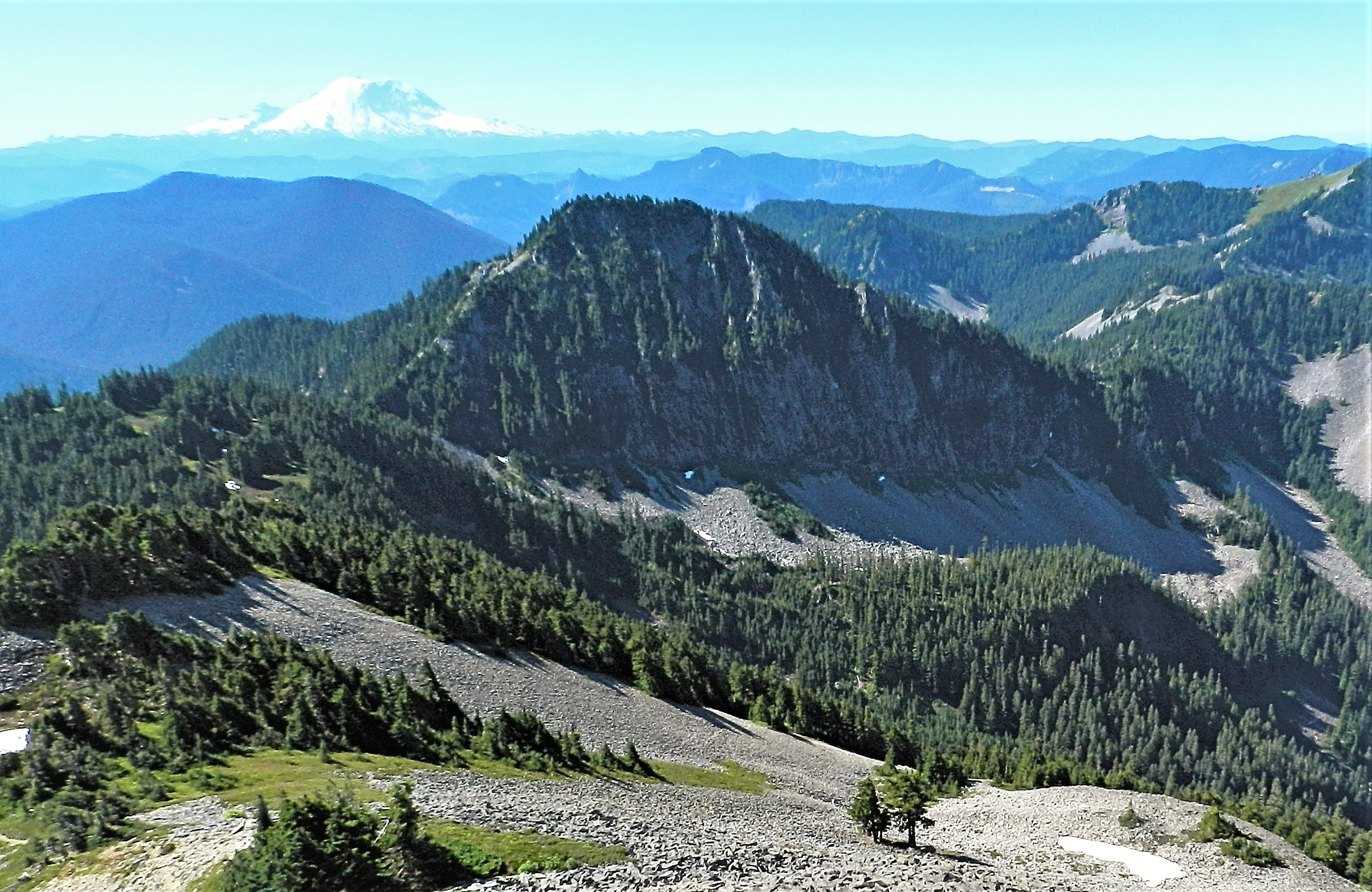
Abiel Peak (centered), Mt. Rainier on the horizon

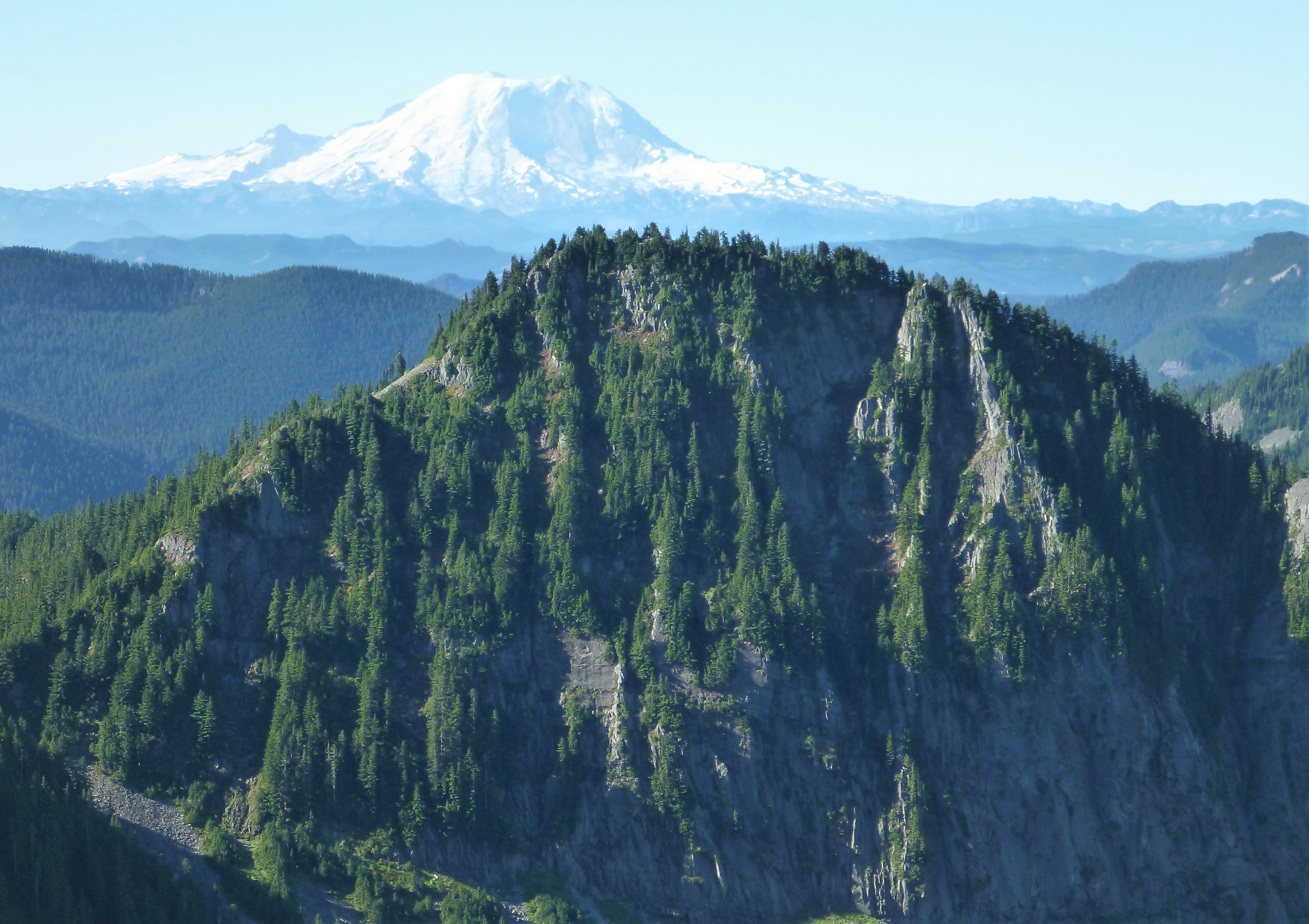
North aspect of Abiel Peak, with Mt. Rainier in the distance.

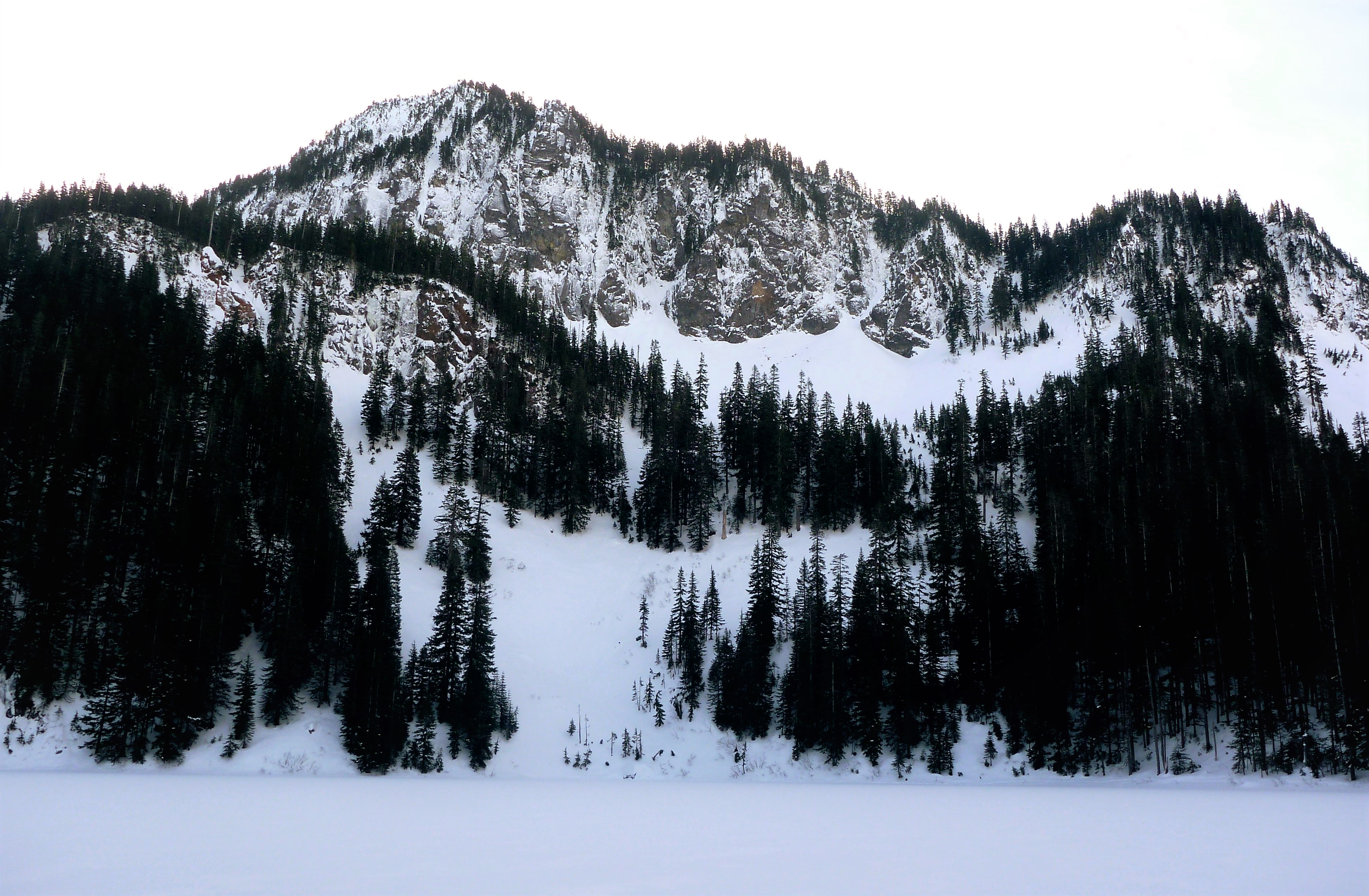
Abiel Peak in winter, from Annette Lake

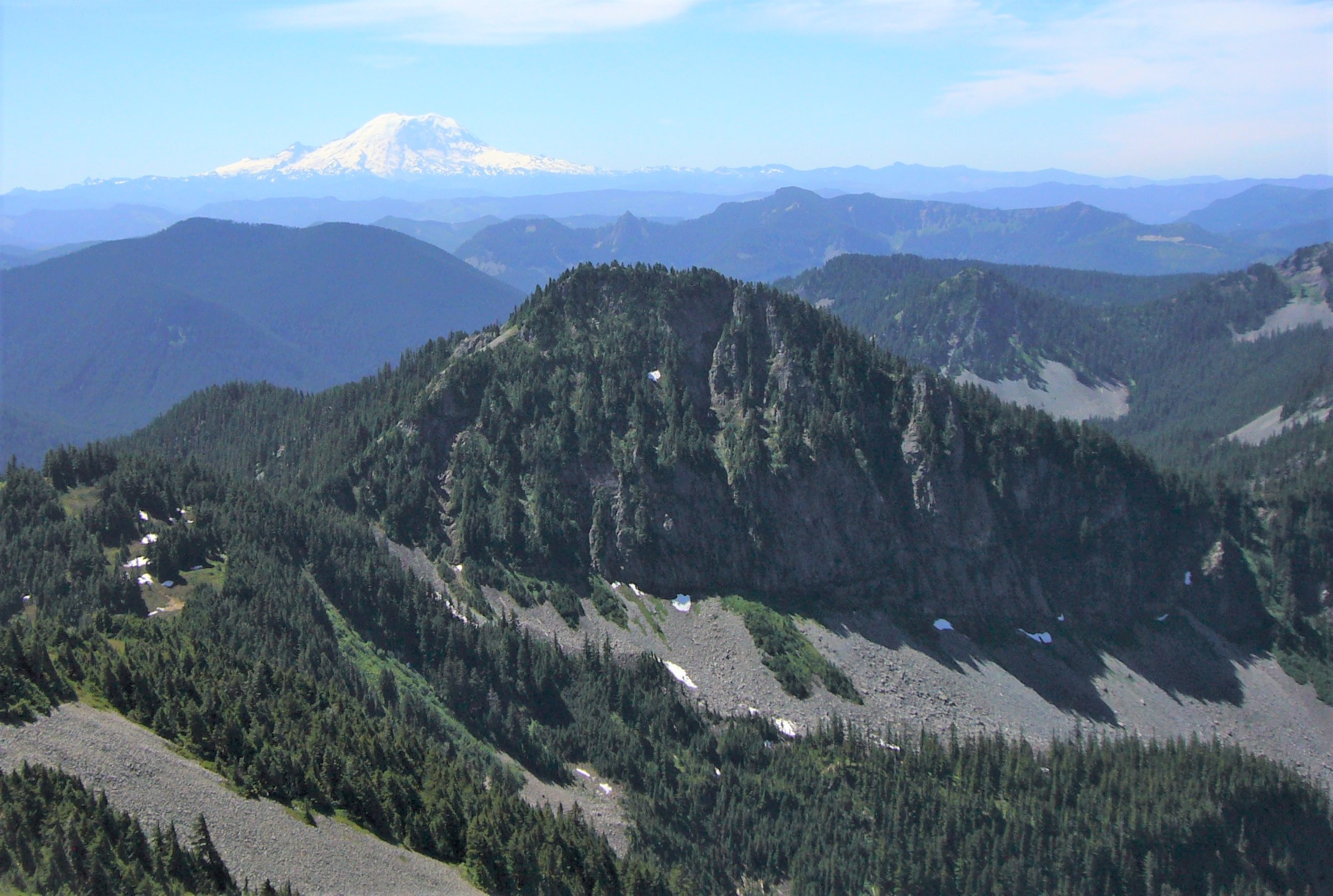
Abiel Peak from Silver Peak

== See also ==
- Geology of the Pacific Northwest
