= Tinkham Peak =

Mountain in Washington (state), United States

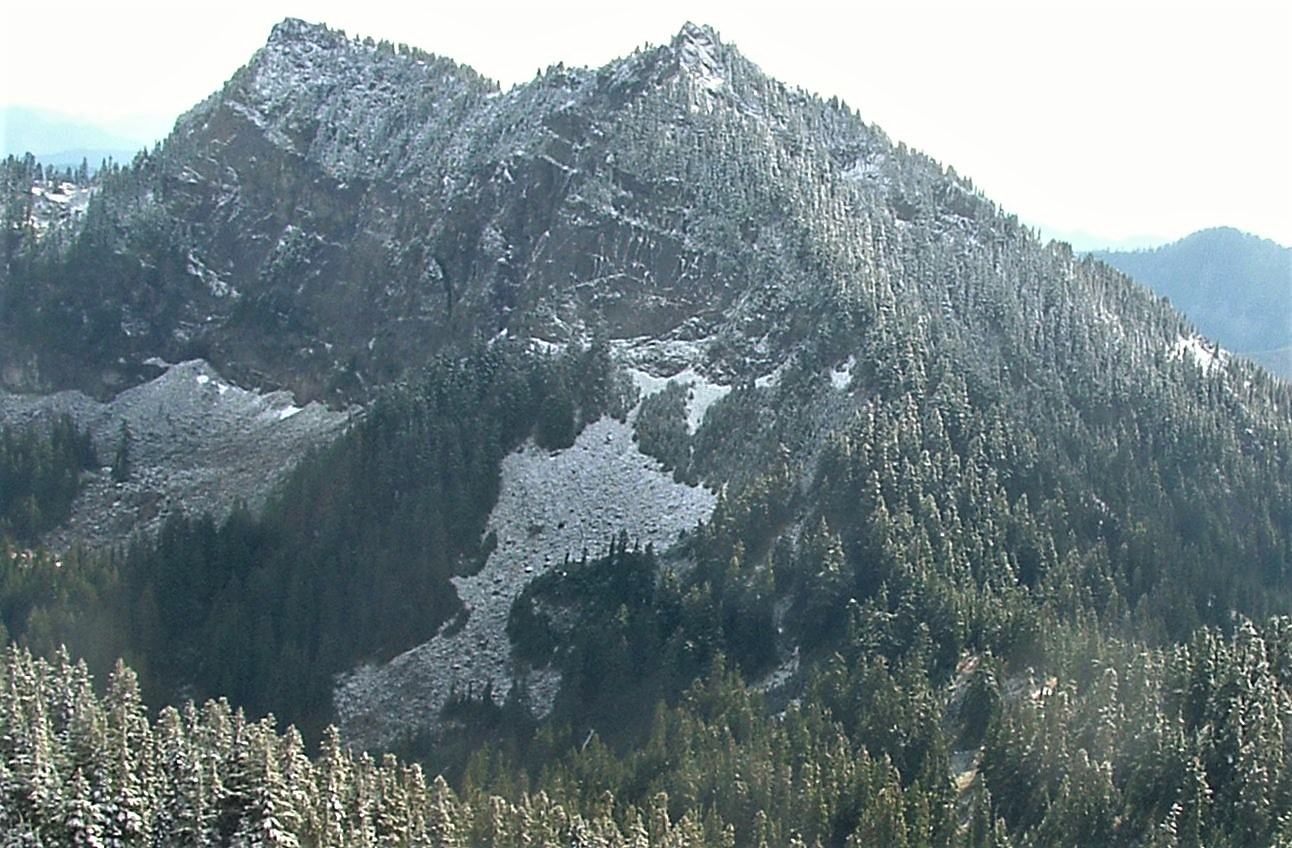
- Northwest aspect

Highest point
- Elevation: 5,398 ft (1,645 m)
- Prominence: 638 ft (194 m)
- Parent peak: Silver Peak (5,605 ft)
- Isolation: 0.91 mi (1.46 km)
- Coordinates: 47°20′52″N 121°27′00″W

Naming
- Etymology: Abiel W. Tinkham

Geography
- Location within Washington (state) Location within the United States
- Location: King / Kittitas Counties; Washington state, U.S.
- Parent range: Cascade Range
- Topo map: USGS Lost Lake

Climbing
- Easiest route: class 2+ scrambling

Tinkham Peak is a double summit mountain located on the common boundary of King County and Kittitas County in Washington state.

== Description ==
Tinkham Peak is situated on the crest of the Cascade Range, on land managed by Mount Baker-Snoqualmie National Forest and Okanogan-Wenatchee National Forest. The east summit, elevation 5,395 feet, is regarded as Tinkham Peak by the USGS, but the west summit, one-quarter mile away, is slightly higher. Tinkham Peak is situated six miles south of Snoqualmie Pass, and neighbors include Silver Peak, one mile to the north-northwest, and Abiel Peak three-quarters mile to the west. Precipitation runoff from the north and east sides of the mountain drains to Keechelus Lake via Cold Creek and Roaring Creek, whereas the south side of the mountain drains to the North Fork Cedar River. Topographic relief is significant as the south aspect rises 2,000 feet (610 meters) above the Cedar in approximately one mile. The Pacific Crest Trail traverses the flanks of the peak and provides access to the Northwest Ridge and Southeast Spur non-technical climbing routes.

== Etymology ==
This geographic landform was named by The Mountaineers and was officially adopted in 1916 by the U.S. Board on Geographic Names to honor Lieutenant Abiel W. Tinkham. He worked as a railroad surveyor when he explored the Snoqualmie Pass area in 1853 and 1854. He is also the namesake of nearby Abiel Peak, and Tinkham Mountain in Glacier National Park, Montana.

== Climate ==
Tinkham Peak is located in the marine west coast climate zone of western North America. Most weather fronts originate in the Pacific Ocean, and travel east toward the Cascade Mountains. As fronts approach, they are forced upward by the peaks of the Cascade Range, causing them to drop their moisture in the form of rain or snowfall onto the Cascades (Orographic lift). As a result, the west side of the Cascades experiences high precipitation, especially during the winter months in the form of snowfall. Because of maritime influence, snow tends to be wet and heavy, resulting in avalanche danger. During winter months, weather is usually cloudy, but due to high pressure systems over the Pacific Ocean that intensify during summer months, there is often little or no cloud cover during the summer. The months July through September offer the most favorable weather for viewing or climbing this peak.

== Gallery ==
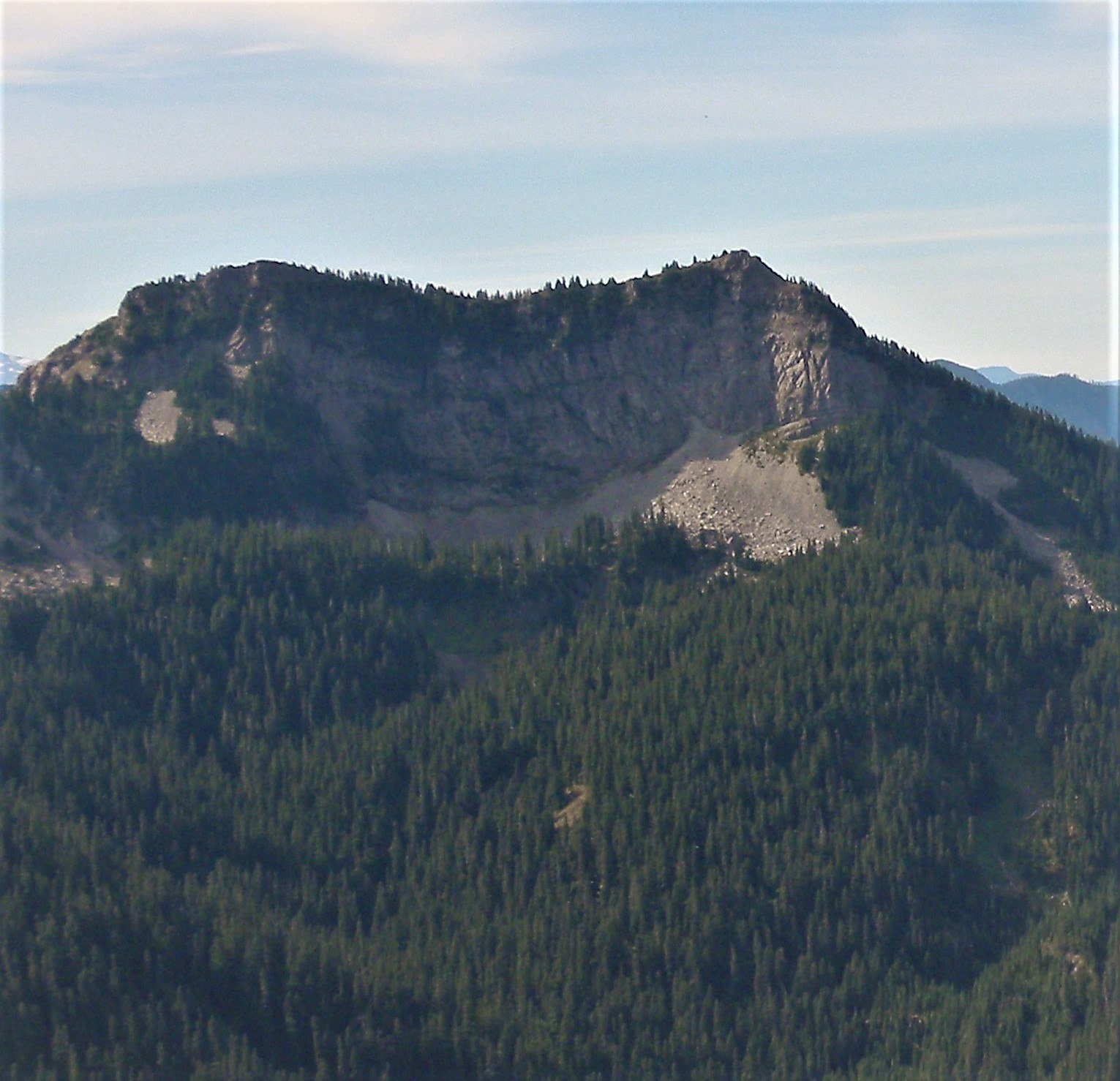
Northeast aspect of Tinkham seen from Mount Catherine

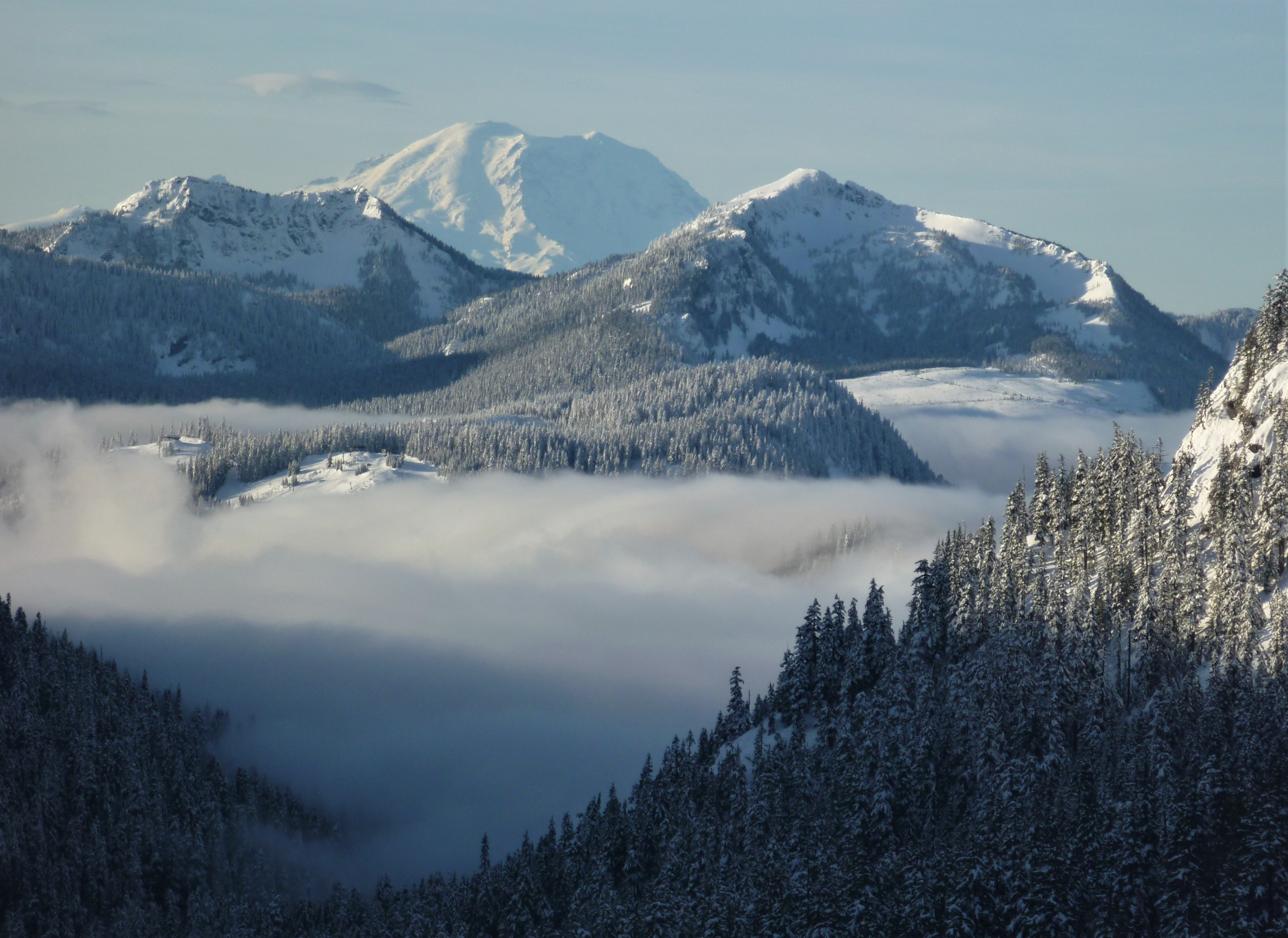
Tinkham Peak (left), Mt. Rainier, Silver Peak seen from Red Mountain

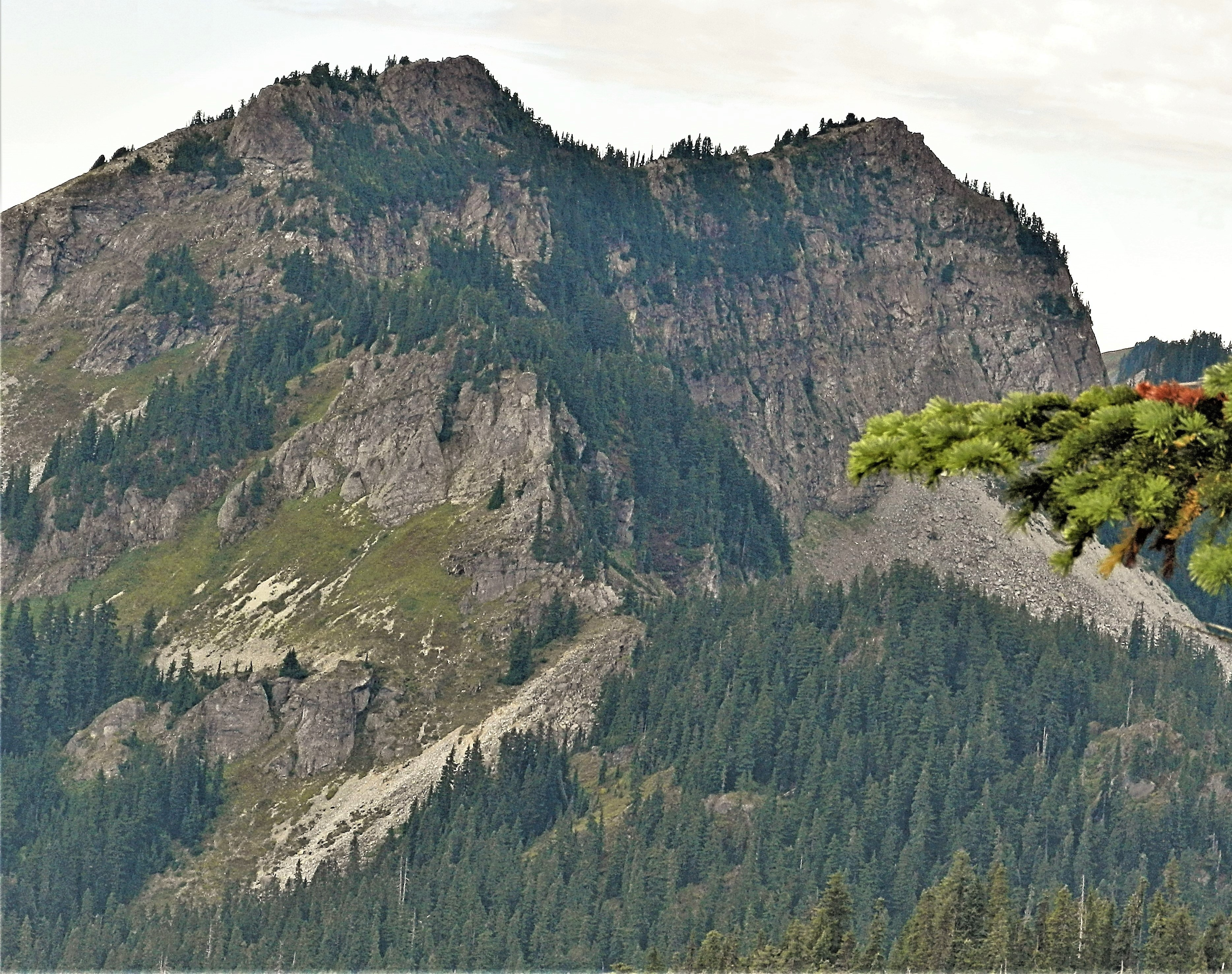
Tinkham Peak

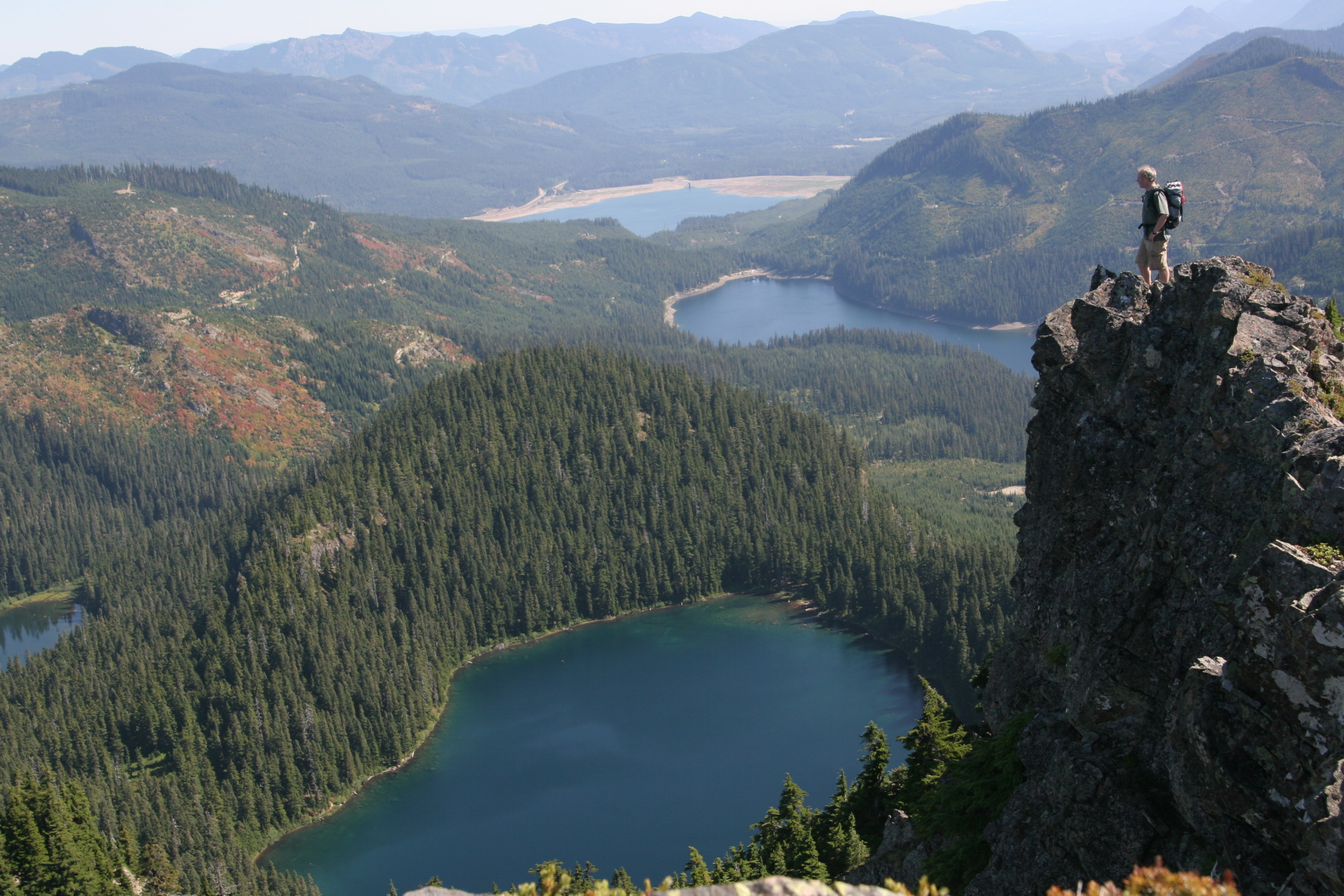
View from Tinkham Peak looking east-southeast. Cottonwood Lake (left), Mirror Lake (bottom), Lost Lake (right of center), Keechelus Lake (top).

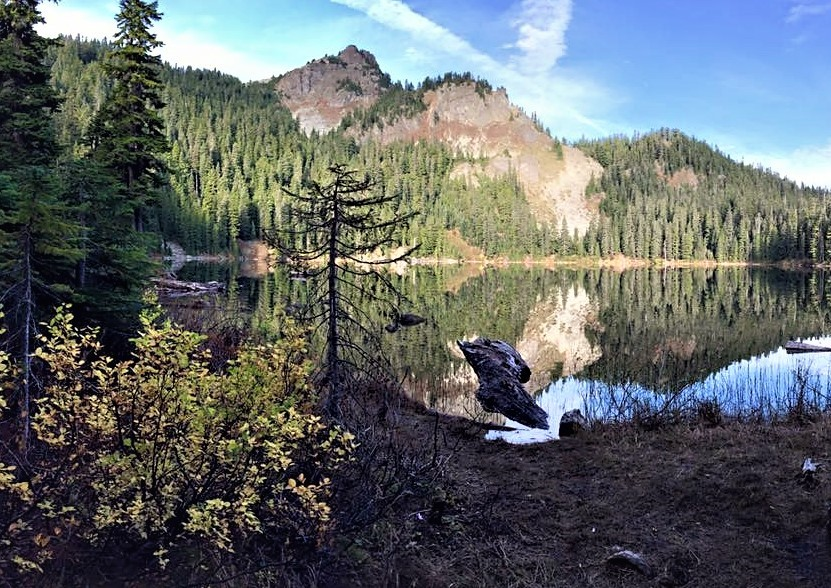
Tinkham Peak reflected in Mirror Lake

== See also ==
- Geology of the Pacific Northwest
