= Humpback Mountain (Cascades) =

Mountain in Washington state, USA

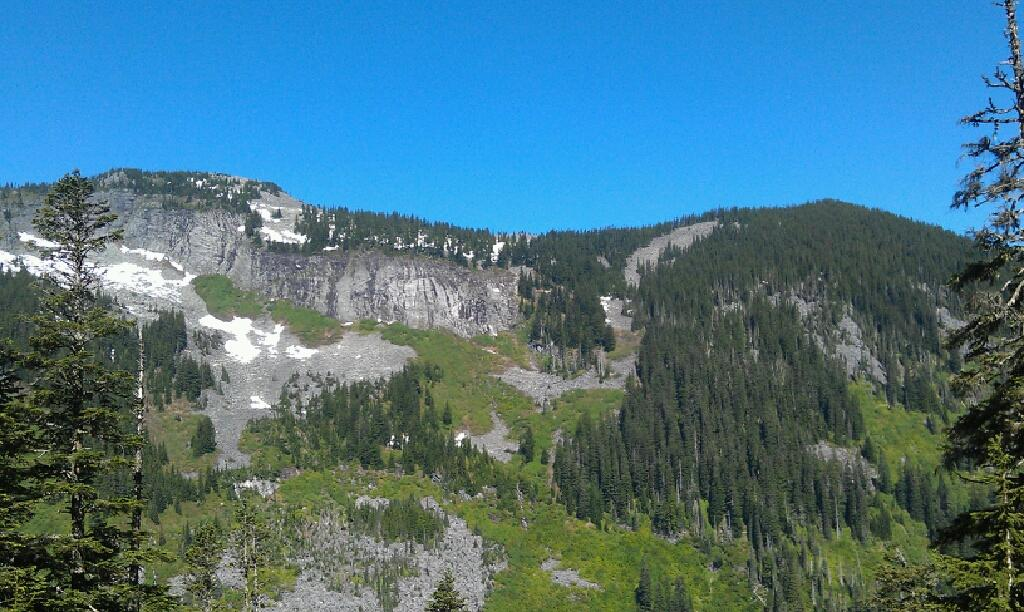
- Humpback Mountain, from the Annette Lake trail

Highest point
- Elevation: 5,174 ft (1,577 m) NGVD 29
- Prominence: 614 ft (187 m)
- Coordinates: 47°22′22″N 121°29′42″W

Geography
- Location within Washington (state) Location within the United States
- Location: King County, Washington, U.S.
- Parent range: Cascades
- Topo map: USGS Lost Lake

Humpback Mountain is a 5,174-foot (1,577 m) mountain peak in the Cascade Range, in King County, Washington.

== Climate ==
Humpback Mountain is located in the marine west coast climate zone of western North America. Most weather fronts originate in the Pacific Ocean, and travel northeast toward the Cascade Mountains. As fronts approach, they are forced upward by the peaks of the Cascade Range, causing them to drop their moisture in the form of rain or snowfall onto the Cascades (Orographic lift). As a result, the west side of the Cascades experiences high precipitation, especially during the winter months in the form of snowfall. During winter months, weather is usually cloudy, but, due to high pressure systems over the Pacific Ocean that intensify during summer months, there is often little or no cloud cover during the summer.

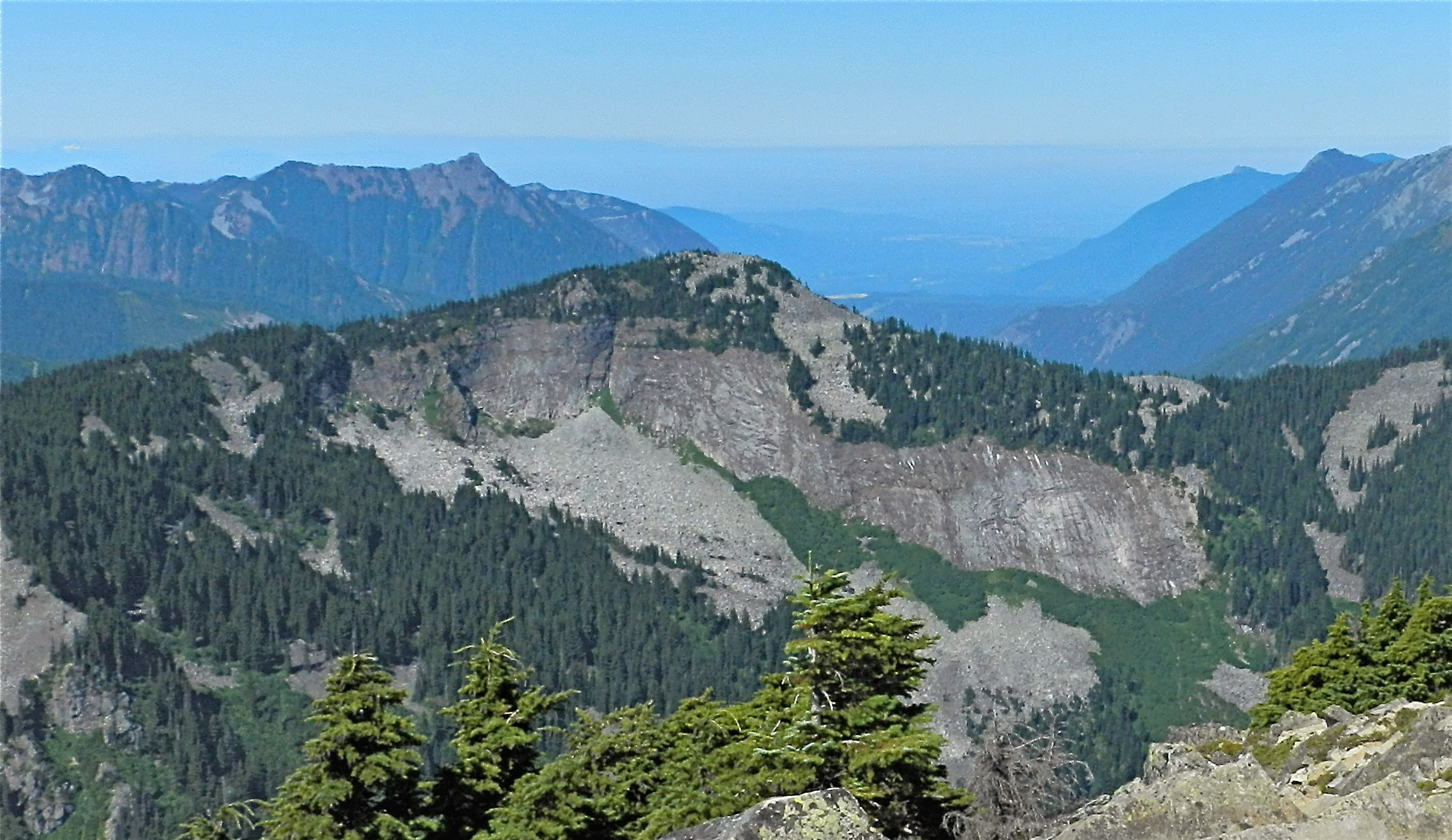
East aspect, seen from Silver Peak
