= Silver Peak (Washington) =

Mountain in Washington (state), United States

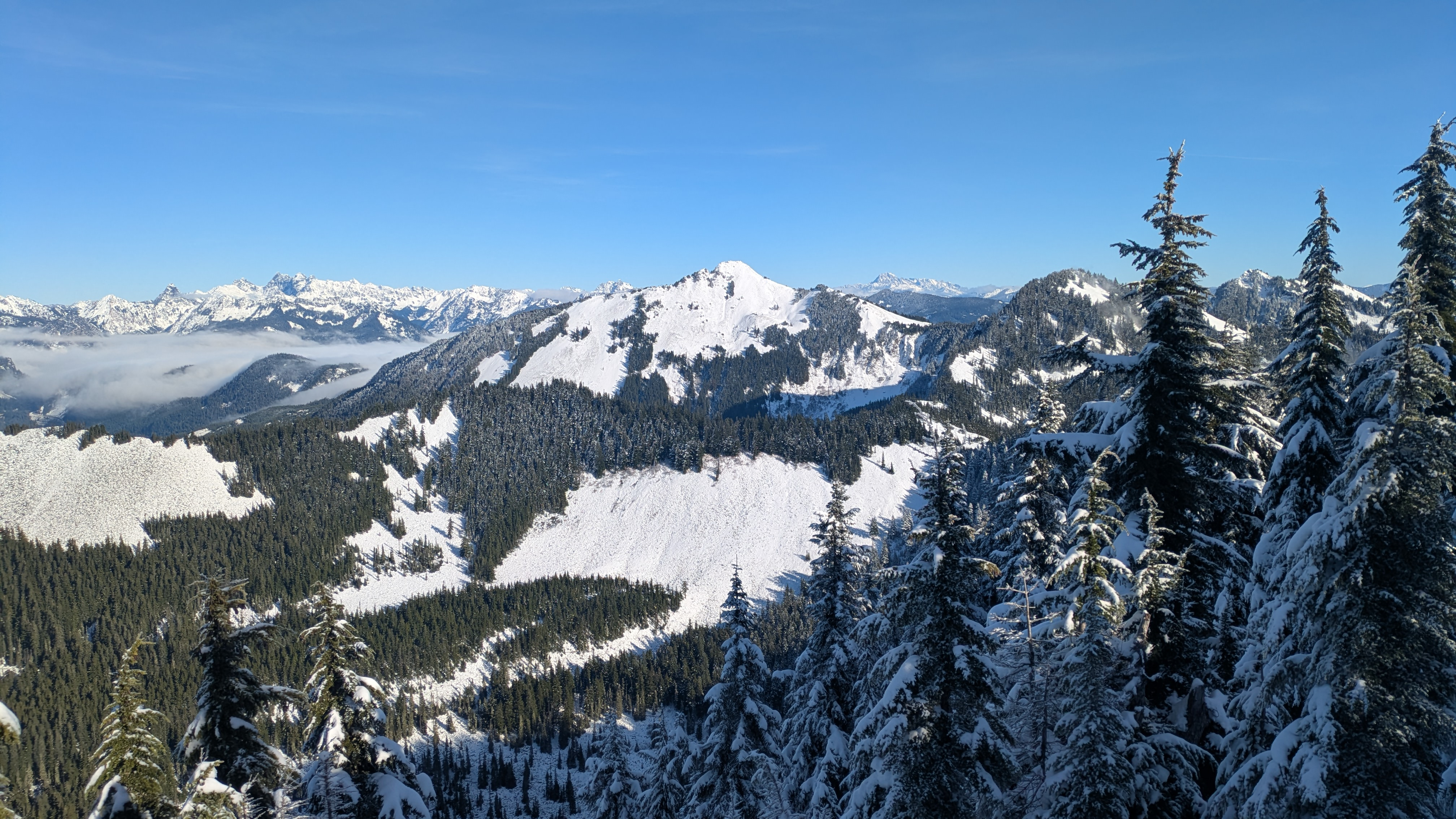
- Silver Peak seen from Bearscout Peak to the west

Highest point
- Elevation: 5,609 ft (1,710 m)
- Prominence: 2,170 ft (661 m)
- Isolation: 4 mi (6.4 km)
- Coordinates: 47°21′41″N 121°27′41″W

Geography
- Location within Washington (state) Location within the United States
- Country: United States
- State: Washington
- County: King / Kittitas
- Parent range: Cascade Range
- Topo map: USGS Lost Lake

Climbing
- Easiest route: Hiking

Silver Peak is a prominent 5,609 ft (1,710 m) mountain located on the shared border between King County and Kittitas County of Washington state. It is set on the crest of the Cascade Range, on land managed by Mount Baker-Snoqualmie National Forest. Silver Peak is situated 4.5 miles southwest of Snoqualmie Pass, and three miles west of Keechelus Lake. The Pacific Crest Trail traverses its east flank and provides easiest access. The nearest higher neighbor is Granite Mountain, 3.98 miles (6.41 km) to the north-northwest. Precipitation runoff from the east side of the mountain drains into Cold Creek, a tributary of the Yakima River, whereas the west side of the mountain drains into the South Fork Snoqualmie River via Humpback Creek.

== Climate ==
Silver Peak is located in the marine west coast climate zone of western North America. Weather fronts originating in the Pacific Ocean travel northeast toward the Cascade Mountains. As fronts approach, they are forced upward by the peaks of the Cascade Range, causing them to drop their moisture in the form of rain or snow onto the Cascades. As a result, the west side of the Cascades experiences high precipitation, especially during the winter months in the form of snowfall. Because of maritime influence, snow tends to be wet and heavy, resulting in high avalanche danger. During winter months, weather is usually cloudy, but due to high pressure systems over the Pacific Ocean that intensify during summer months, there is often little or no cloud cover during the summer. The months of July through September offer the most favorable weather for viewing or climbing this peak.

== See also ==
- Geography of Washington (state)

== Gallery ==
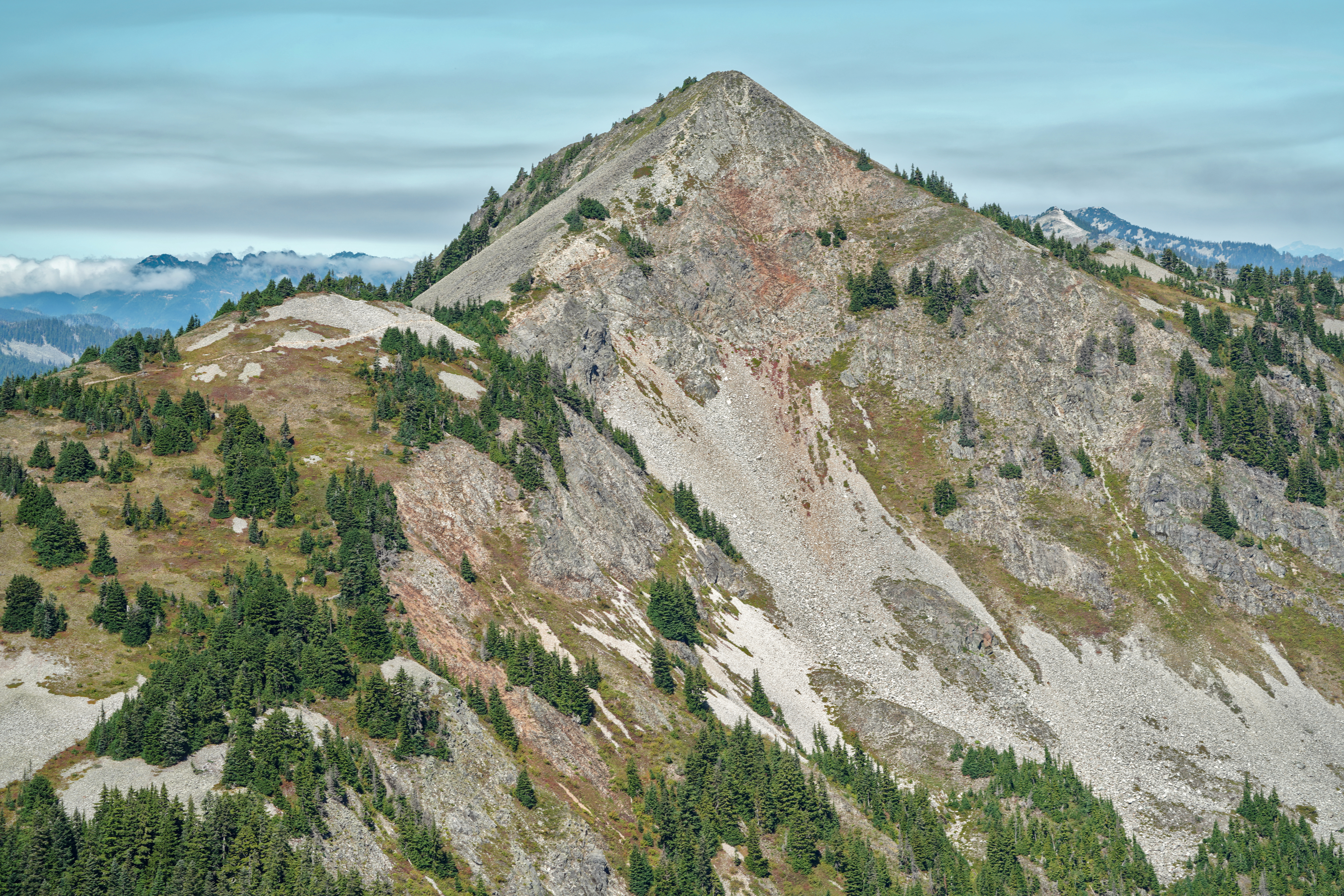
Southeast aspect, from Tinkham Peak

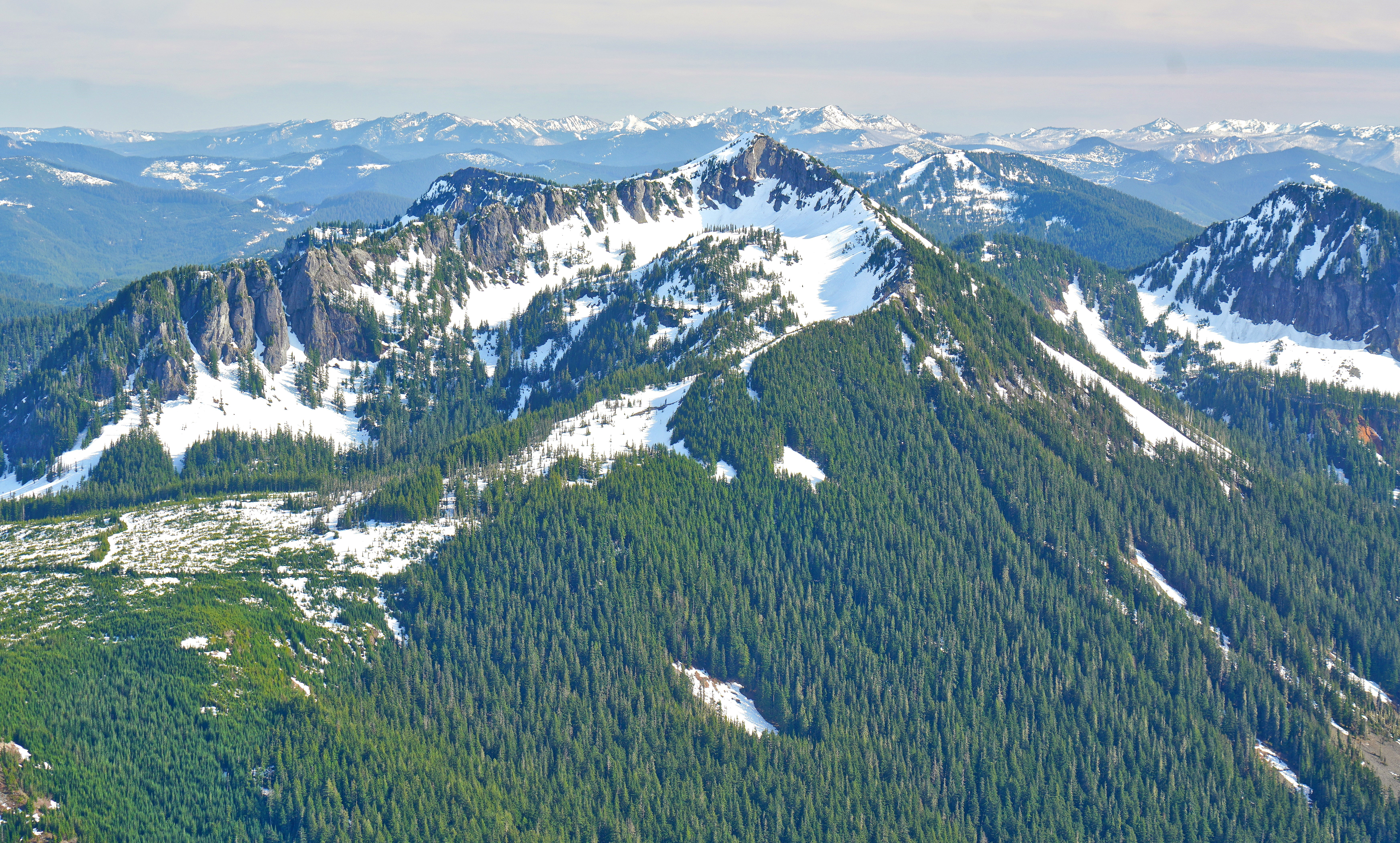
North aspect, from Granite Mountain

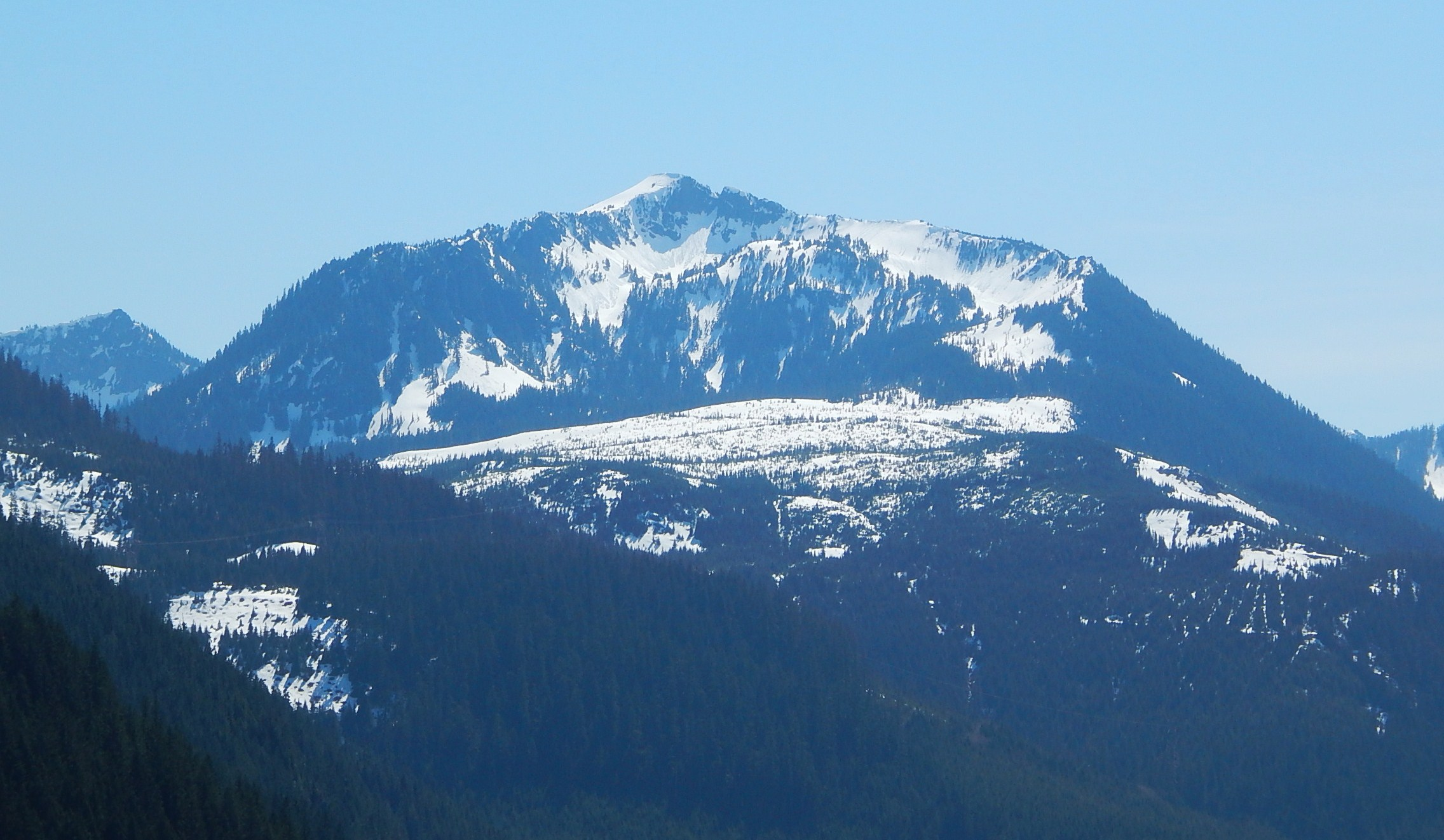
The north aspect of Silver Peak seen from Interstate 90

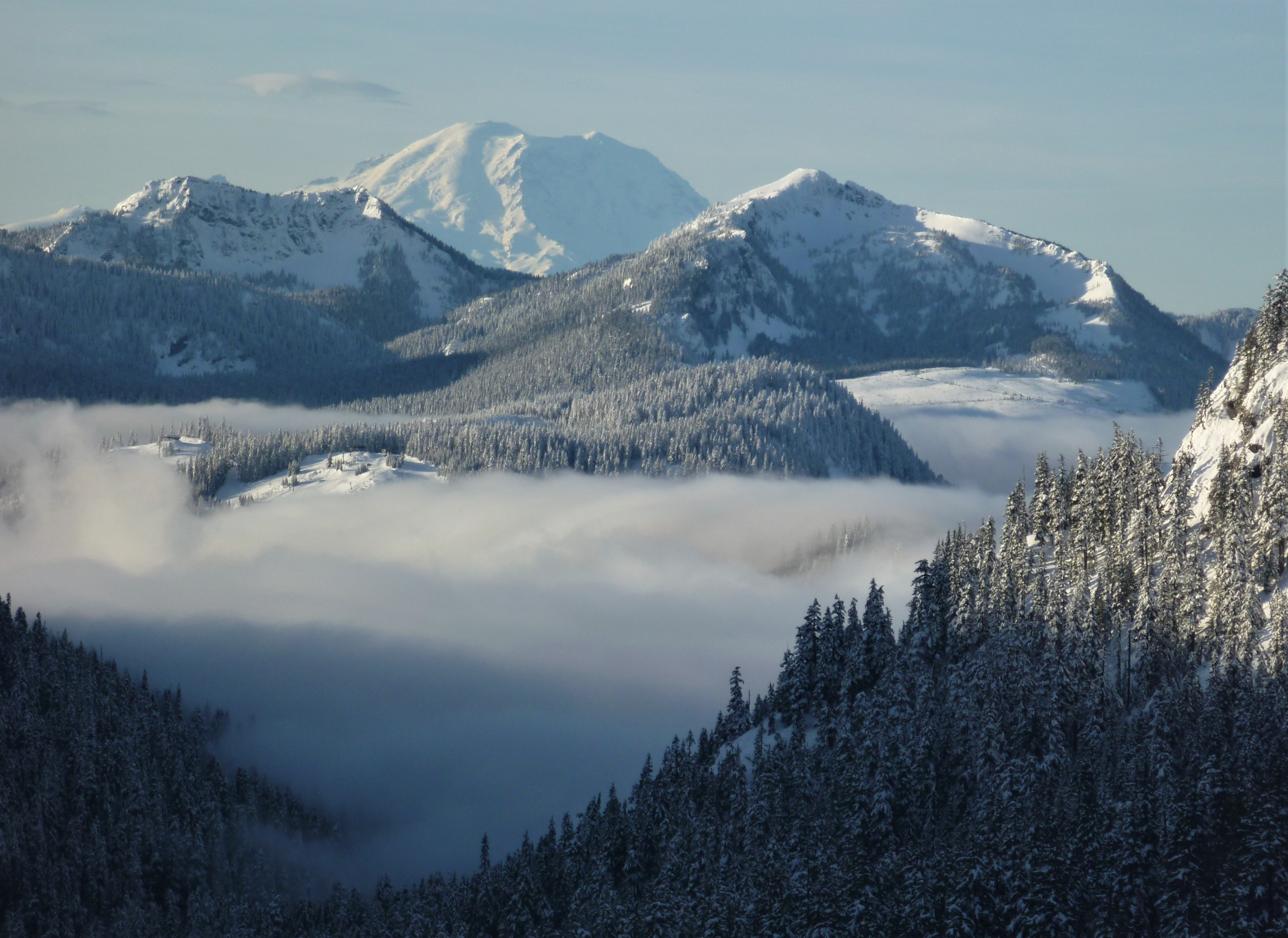
Tinkham Peak, Mt. Rainier, Silver Peak seen from Red Mountain
