= George Henry Tinkham =

California pioneer historian (1849–1945)

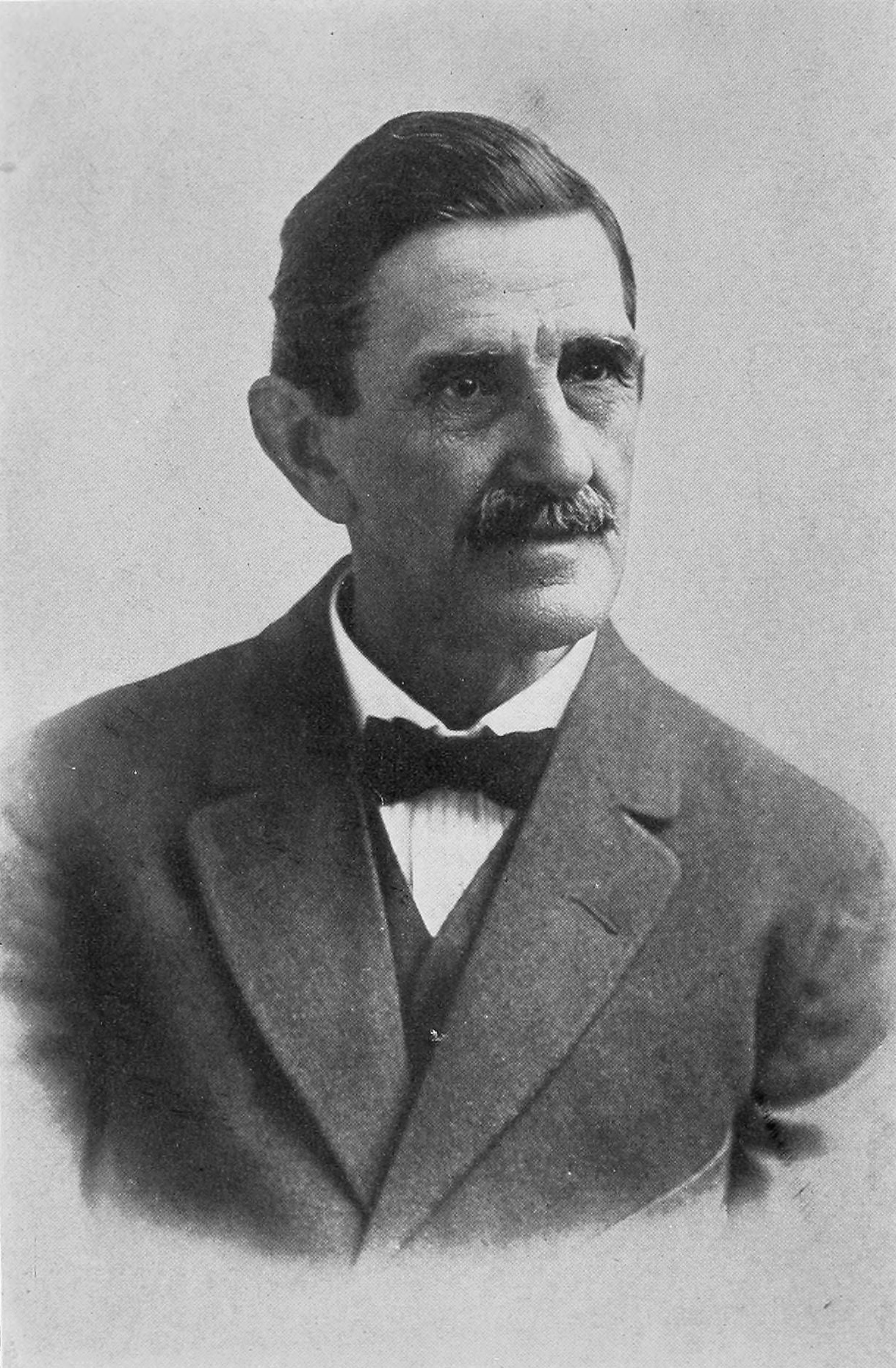
- Tinkham, in his 60s: frontispiece of his book, California Men and Events, 2nd ed. (1915)
- Born: George Henry Tinkham; March 15, 1849; Boston, Massachusetts, US
- Died: March 9, 1945 (aged 95); French Camp, California, US
- Resting place: Stockton Rural Cemetery, Stockton, California, US
- Other name: Geo. H. Tinkham
- Occupations: Historian, writer
- Known for: Early history of Stockton, San Joaquin County, and California

George Henry Tinkham (often cited as George H. Tinkham; March 15, 1849 – March 9, 1945) was an American journalist and pioneer historian during the late 19th and early 20th century. He was a writer and compiler of early local history in California, especially in Stockton and San Joaquin Valley, where he grew up and lived the rest of his life.

== Early life ==
George Henry Tinkham was born March 1849 in Boston, Massachusetts, to parents of Scottish-English (father) and Dutch (mother) ancestry. Two months later, his father joined the California gold rush and immigrated to Stockton, California. Four years later, his mother brought first-born Tinkham (and baby sister) across Panama by mule to join him in Stockton; the family eventually grew to eight children.

Tinkham attended the newly established public schools at Stockton before a high school was formed and worked for his father, a butcher at the city market. After his younger brother took over his job at the city market, he roamed for fourteen years seeking some occupation that would satisfy; he tried ranching, sheepherding, clerking (grocery, drug store), driving (streetcar, water-sprinkling wagon), editing the weekly Record, and writing occasional news items for the Stockton Independent newspaper.

In 1915, he reflected on his life: "In boyhood he mingled with the pioneers. He attended the public schools and grew to manhood with other pioneer sons. He has seen the majority of the '49ers pass on to the land whose streets are paved with gold. And he now sees a second generation of native sons spring into birth and active life."

== Writing career ==
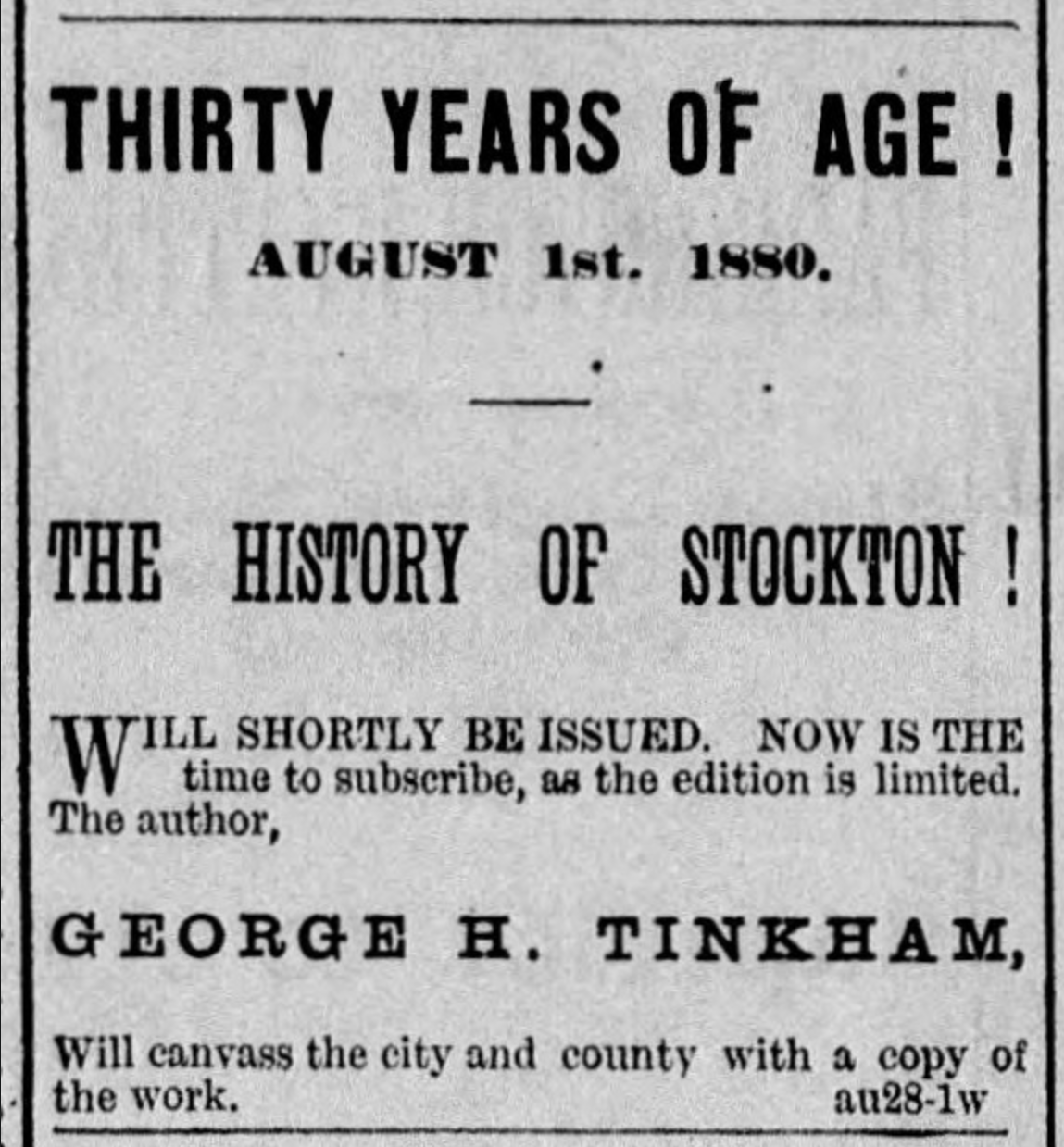
Ad in Stockton newspaper (August 1880) that Tinkham himself will be canvassing for his own limited edition book

In 1878, while Tinkham was working as a book agent, a friend from his schoolboy days suggested he should write a history of Stockton. That was the trigger he needed to devote the next two years preparing and writing his first major historical work, A History of Stockton from its organization up to the present time, which was a labor of love with no remuneration. The book's frontispiece featured a signed portrait of the founder of Stockton, whom Tinkham consulted, Charles M. Weber, with the date, July 4, 1880. In its preface, he wrote: "the low state of finances compelled me to do all of my own labor". By canvassing hard door to door for his own book, Tinkham was able to sell enough copies to cover the publishing cost. But when the publisher wanted to charge him $20 for storage of the remainder, he told them to sell all 1500 of his remainder books to the paper mill. Looking back, he considered his History of Stockton as a financial failure; all told, he made $800 for his efforts over more than two years.

He [Tinkham] is merely saturated with the romances of past years, and is culling their fruitage for men and women yet to come, knowing that however his work might be ignored in the present, it will live!

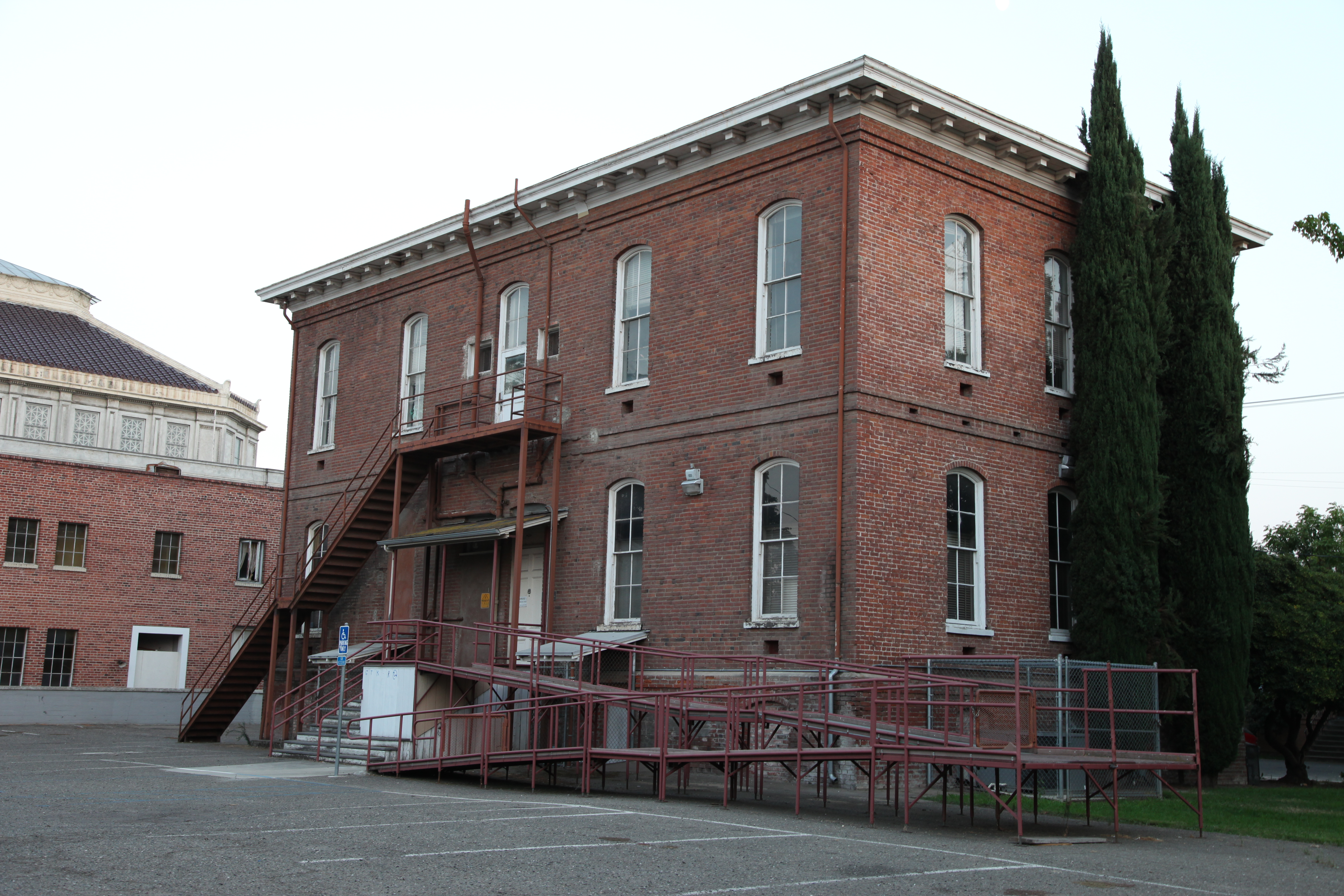
The back of the Weber School building where Tinkham, in his 30s on, was janitor to support his writing

To support his newly found labor of love, Tinkham took on a salaried position at $40 per month as janitor at the Weber public school building, which he held for fourteen years. During this time, he wrote four hours a day and compiled pages of manuscript for his next history book California Men and Events. He reportedly followed the Macaulay's historical style and was determined to make his California history a financial success. In addition, he produced daily "20 Years Ago Today" vignettes for the Stockton Record for six years. He also wrote many historical sketches for the Stockton Mail. He was known as the historian of Stockton.

In 1907, H. A. Preston from the Historic Record Company in Los Angeles, which was producing large handsome volumes of early histories of California counties together with extensive biographies compiled by the company as prestige collectibles marketed to subscribers, approached Tinkham to ask him to write a history of San Joaquin County for the company. Tinkham hesitated and tried to decline before he accepted the offer, which proved to be easy money and was the beginning of his transition from a local Stockton historian/journalist to a contract writer of county histories to accompany the subscription biographies by the company.

His first Historic Record Company publication appeared in 1909 in two volumes, copyrighted by the company, with James Miller Guinn writing the history of the State of California and Tinkham writing the history of San Joaquin County, all in Volume I, and the biographical sketches in Volume II. The following year he wrote a history of San Benito County, which was published in a historical compilation by the company. A decade later, while he was in his seventies, Tinkham compiled for the company a history of Stanislaus County in 1921. In 1923 he completed an expanded stand-alone history of San Joaquin County, which featured a steel-engraved image of himself on the frontispiece (same image as in his 1915 book, 2nd ed.) and a biography of himself by the company in the biographical sketches. Both the 1909 and 1923 editions of the history of San Joaquin county carried the commemorative biography of his father, Henry Tinkham, who died in 1894.

== Death ==
After his last book was published in 1923, capping 45 years of writing historical works, Tinkham spent two more decades in Stockton, known as the historian of San Joaquin County and California. He died of arteriosclerosis in March 1945, six days before his 96th birthday, survived only by a brother. His obituary was carried by the Stockton Record on its front page. He was buried in Stockton Rural Cemetery.

== Major works ==
- Tinkham, George H. (1880). A History of Stockton From its Organization Up to the Present Time, including a sketch of San Joaquin County: comprising a history of the government, politics, state of religion, fire department, commerce, secret societies, art, science, manufactures, agriculture and miscellaneous events within the past thirty years. San Francisco, California: W. M. Hinton, Printers – via archive.org.
- Tinkham, George H. (1906). "The Half Century of California Odd Fellowship". Stockton, California: Record Publishing Co. – via archive.org.
- Guinn, J. M. (James Miller); Tinkham, George H. (1909). History of the State of California and Biographical Record of San Joaquin County; Containing Biographies of Well-Known Citizens of the Past and Present. Los Angeles, California: Historic Record Co. – via archive.org.
- Tinkham, George H. (1915). California Men and Events: Time 1769-1890 (2 ed.). Stockton, California: Record Publishing Company – via archive.org. First edition (Panama Pacific Exhibition edition) published in February 1915; revised 2nd edition published in December 1915.
- Tinkham, George H. (1921). History of Stanislaus County California: with Biographical Sketches of the Leading Men and Women of the County Who Have Been Identified With its Growth and Development From the Early Days to the Present. Los Angeles, California: Historic Record Company – via archive.org.
- Tinkham, George H. (1923). History of San Joaquin County, California: with biographical sketches of leading men and women of the county who have been identified with its growth and development from the early days to the present. Los Angeles, California: Historic Record Company – via archive.org.
