= Frank L. Tinkham =

American football and basketball coach

Biographical details
- Born: May 12, 1884; New York, U.S.
- Died: August 1, 1963 (aged 79); Lancaster, California, U.S.
- Education: Coe (1909); Princeton Theo. Sem.

Coaching career (HC unless noted)

Football
- 1909–1910: Westminster (MO)
- 1911: Daniel Baker
- 1913–1914: Westminster (PA)

Basketball
- 1909–1910: Westminster (MO)

Administrative career (AD unless noted)
- 1910–1911: Westminster (MO)
- 1911–1912: Daniel Baker

Head coaching record
- Overall: 3–4 (basketball)

Frank Louis Tinkham (May 12, 1884 – August 1, 1963) was an American college football and college basketball coach.

== Biography ==
Tinkham was a native of Russell, Iowa, and graduated from Coe College in Cedar Rapids, Iowa, in 1909.

Tinkham served as the head football coach, athletic director, and head men's basketball coach at Westminster College in Fulton, Missouri, during the 1909–10 academic year. He served as the head football coach at Daniel Baker College in Brownwood, Texas in 1911 and Westminster College in New Wilmington, Pennsylvania from 1913 to 1914.

Tinkham was later a school teacher in Los Angeles and live in Palmdale, California. He died on August 1, 1963, at a rest home in Lancaster, California.
