= Mount Catherine (Washington) =

Mountain in Washington (state), United States

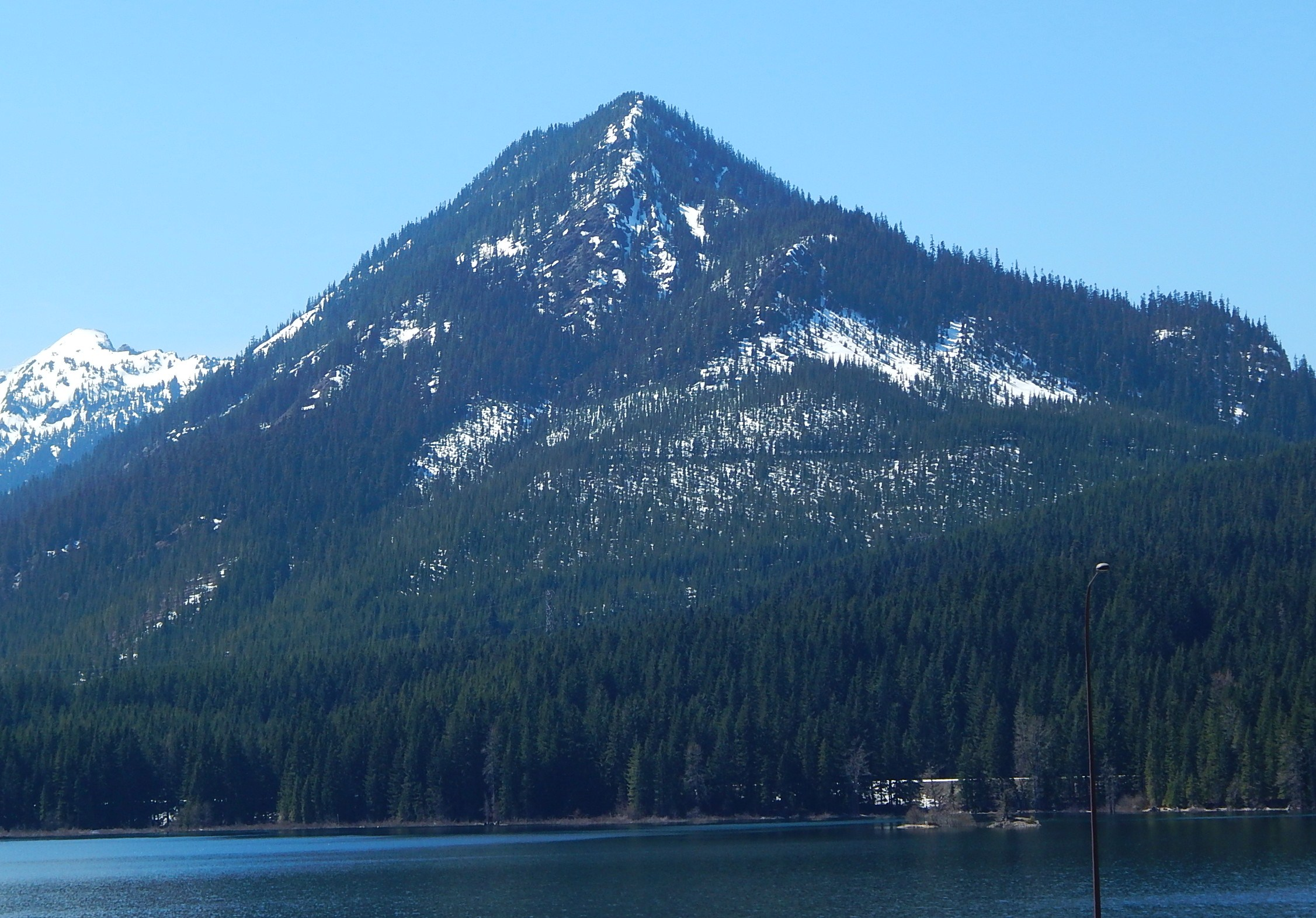
- Mount Catherine

Highest point
- Elevation: 5,052 ft (1,540 m) NGVD 29
- Prominence: 1,212 ft (369 m)
- Coordinates: 47°22′20″N 121°25′37″W

Geography
- Location: Kittitas County, Washington, U.S.
- Parent range: Cascades
- Topo map: USGS Lost Lake

Mount Catherine is a mountain peak in the Cascade Range in Washington state located near Snoqualmie Pass and Keechelus Lake. It is accessible via Forest Road 9070 except in winter. The Nordic Pass snowshoe trail starts near the Summit East ski area (formerly called Hyak), and ends at this popular destination at a low point on the west ridge of Mount Catherine. Winter ascents of Mount Catherine are frequently done by continuing up the ridge to the summit.

== Climate ==
Mount Catherine is located in the marine west coast climate zone of western North America. Most weather fronts originate in the Pacific Ocean, and travel northeast toward the Cascade Mountains. As fronts approach, they are forced upward by the peaks of the Cascade Range, causing them to drop their moisture in the form of rain or snowfall onto the Cascades. As a result, the west side of the North Cascades experiences high precipitation, especially during the winter months in the form of snowfall. Due to its temperate climate and proximity to the Pacific Ocean, areas west of the Cascade Crest very rarely experience temperatures below 0 °F (−18 °C) or above 80 °F (27 °C). During winter months, weather is usually cloudy, but, due to high pressure systems over the Pacific Ocean that intensify during summer months, there is often little or no cloud cover during the summer. Because of maritime influence, snow tends to be wet and heavy, resulting in high avalanche danger.
