= Red Mountain (King County, Washington) =

Mountain in Washington (state), United States

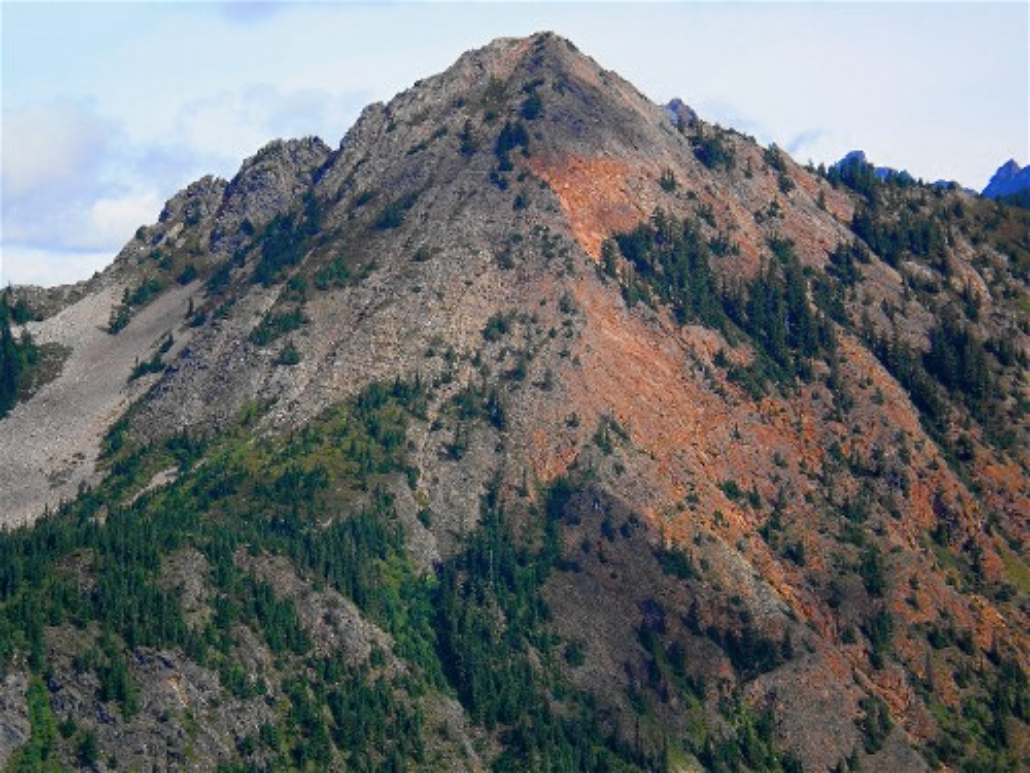
- Red Mountain seen from Guye Peak

Highest point
- Elevation: 5,890 ft (1,795 m)
- Prominence: 530 ft (162 m)
- Parent peak: Snoqualmie Mountain (6,278 ft)
- Isolation: 1.3 mi (2.1 km)
- Coordinates: 47°27′22″N 121°23′21″W

Geography
- Location within Washington (state)
- Country: United States
- State: Washington
- County: King
- Protected area: Alpine Lakes Wilderness
- Parent range: Cascade Range
- Topo map: USGS Snoqualmie Pass

Climbing
- First ascent: 1898 W.C. Mendenhall
- Easiest route: Scrambling

Red Mountain is a 5,890-foot (1,795-metre) mountain summit located in King County of Washington state. It is set within the Alpine Lakes Wilderness which is part of the Cascade Range. Red Mountain is situated three miles north of Snoqualmie Pass on land managed by Mount Baker-Snoqualmie National Forest. The nearest higher neighbor is Lundin Peak, 0.7 mi (1.1 km) to the northwest. Precipitation runoff on the north side of the mountain drains into Middle Fork of the Snoqualmie River, whereas the south side of the mountain drains into the South Fork Snoqualmie River via Commonwealth Creek.

== Climate ==
Red Mountain is located in the marine west coast climate zone of western North America.

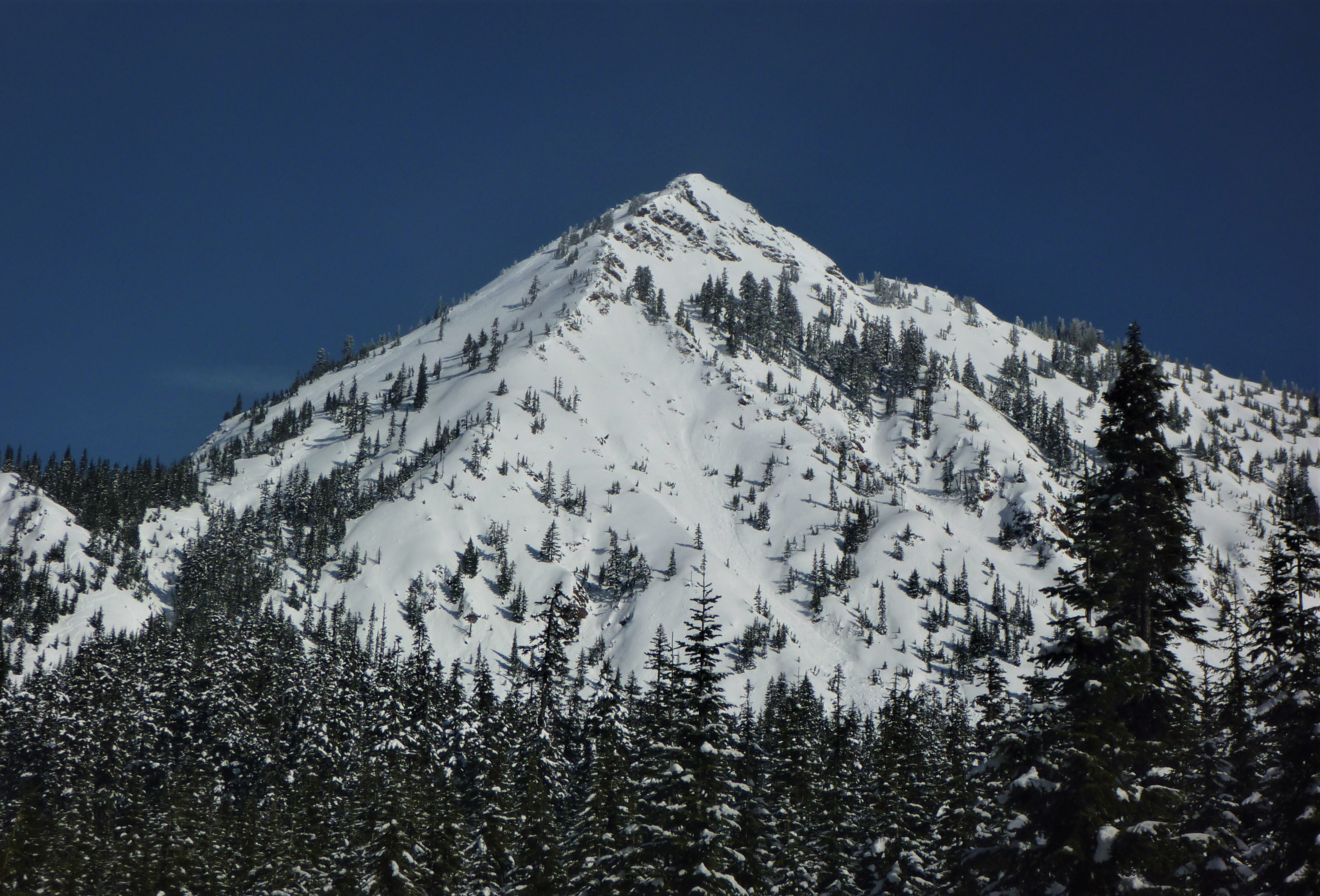
Red Mountain in winter

Weather fronts originating in the Pacific Ocean travel northeast toward the Cascade Mountains. As fronts approach, they are forced upward by the peaks of the Cascade Range, causing them to drop their moisture in the form of rain or snow onto the Cascades (Orographic lift). As a result, the west side of the Cascades experiences high precipitation, especially during the winter months in the form of snowfall. Because of maritime influence, snow tends to be wet and heavy, resulting in high avalanche danger. During winter months, weather is usually cloudy, but due to high pressure systems over the Pacific Ocean that intensify during summer months, there is often little or no cloud cover during the summer. The months of July through September offer the most favorable weather for viewing or climbing this peak.

== Geology ==
The Alpine Lakes Wilderness features some of the most rugged topography in the Cascade Range with craggy peaks and ridges, deep glacial valleys, and granite walls spotted with over 700 mountain lakes. Geological events occurring many years ago created the diverse topography and drastic elevation changes over the Cascade Range leading to the various climate differences.

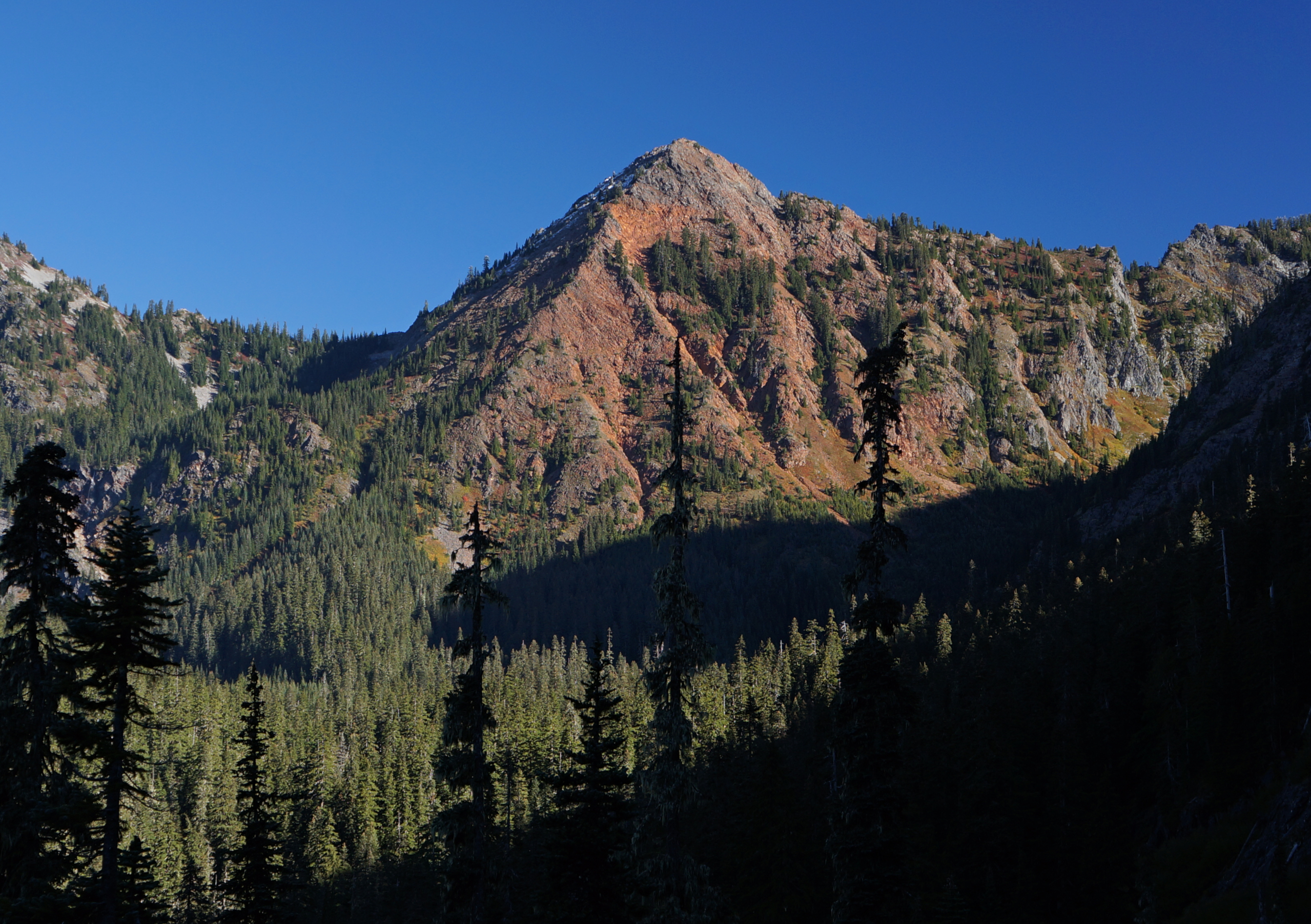
Red Mountain from Commonwealth Basin

The history of the formation of the Cascade Mountains dates back millions of years ago to the late Eocene Epoch. With the North American Plate overriding the Pacific Plate, episodes of volcanic igneous activity persisted. In addition, small fragments of the oceanic and continental lithosphere called terranes created the North Cascades about 50 million years ago.

During the Pleistocene period dating back over two million years ago, glaciation advancing and retreating repeatedly scoured and shaped the landscape. The last glacial retreat in the Alpine Lakes area began about 14,000 years ago and was north of the Canada–US border by 10,000 years ago. The U-shaped cross section of the river valleys is a result of that recent glaciation. Uplift and faulting in combination with glaciation have been the dominant processes which have created the tall peaks and deep valleys of the Alpine Lakes Wilderness area.

== See also ==
- List of peaks of the Alpine Lakes Wilderness
