= Tinkham Mountain =

Mountain in Montana, United States

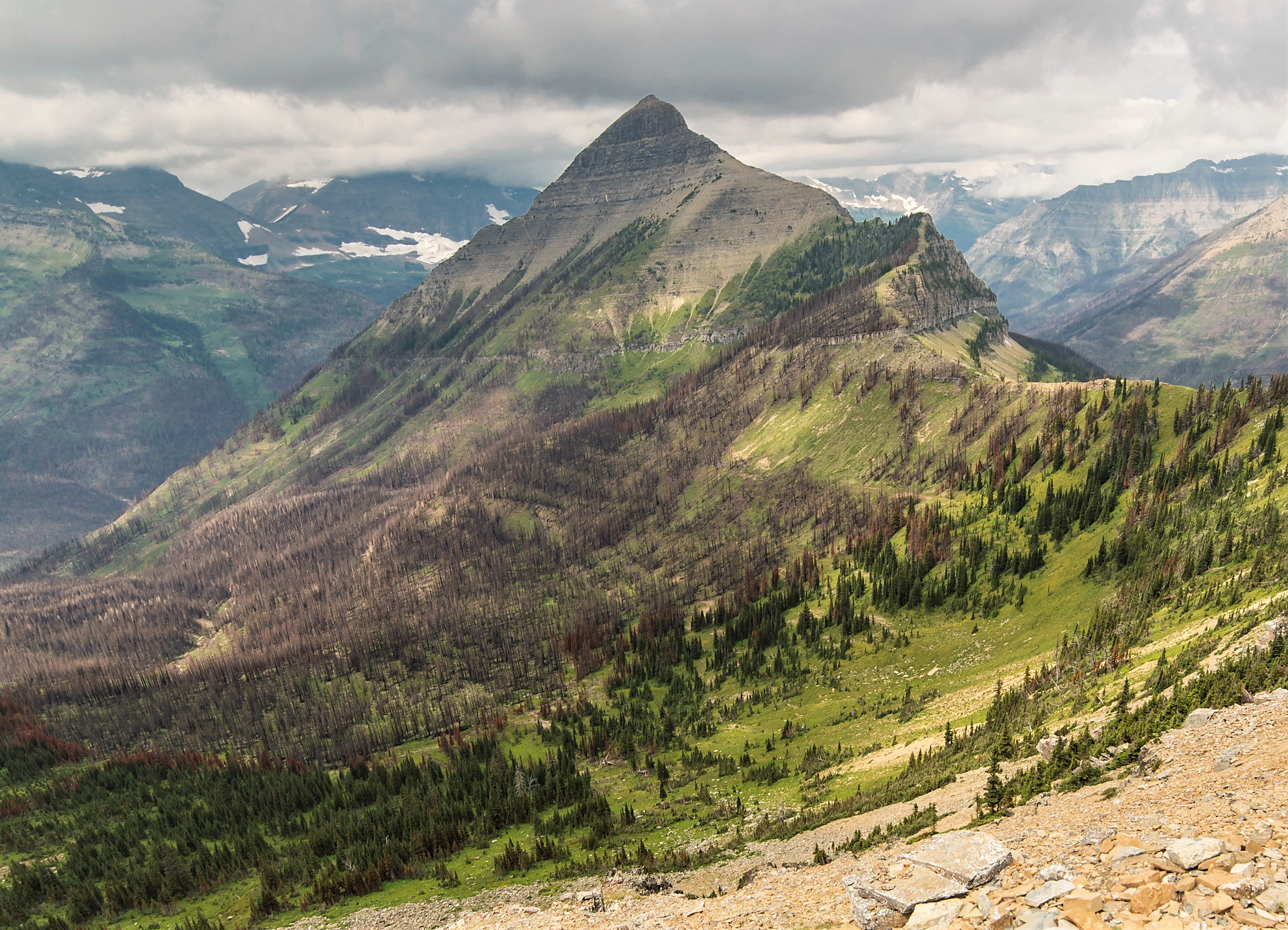
- East aspect, from Cutbank Pass (Scars from 2015 Thompson Fire visible)

Highest point
- Elevation: 8,447 ft (2,575 m)
- Prominence: 1,082 ft (330 m)
- Coordinates: 48°31′30″N 113°30′23″W

Naming
- Etymology: Abiel W. Tinkham

Geography
- Location within Montana Location within the United States
- Location: Flathead County, Montana, U.S.
- Parent range: Lewis Range
- Topo map(s): USGS Mount Stimson, MT

Climbing
- Easiest route: class 3

Tinkham Mountain (8,447 feet (2,575 m)) is located in the Lewis Range, Glacier National Park in the U.S. state of Montana. This mountain's name was officially adopted in 1929 by the United States Board on Geographic Names to recognize Lieutenant Abiel W. Tinkham, the first white man to cross the Continental Divide at what would later become Glacier National Park.

== See also ==
- Mountains and mountain ranges of Glacier National Park (U.S.)

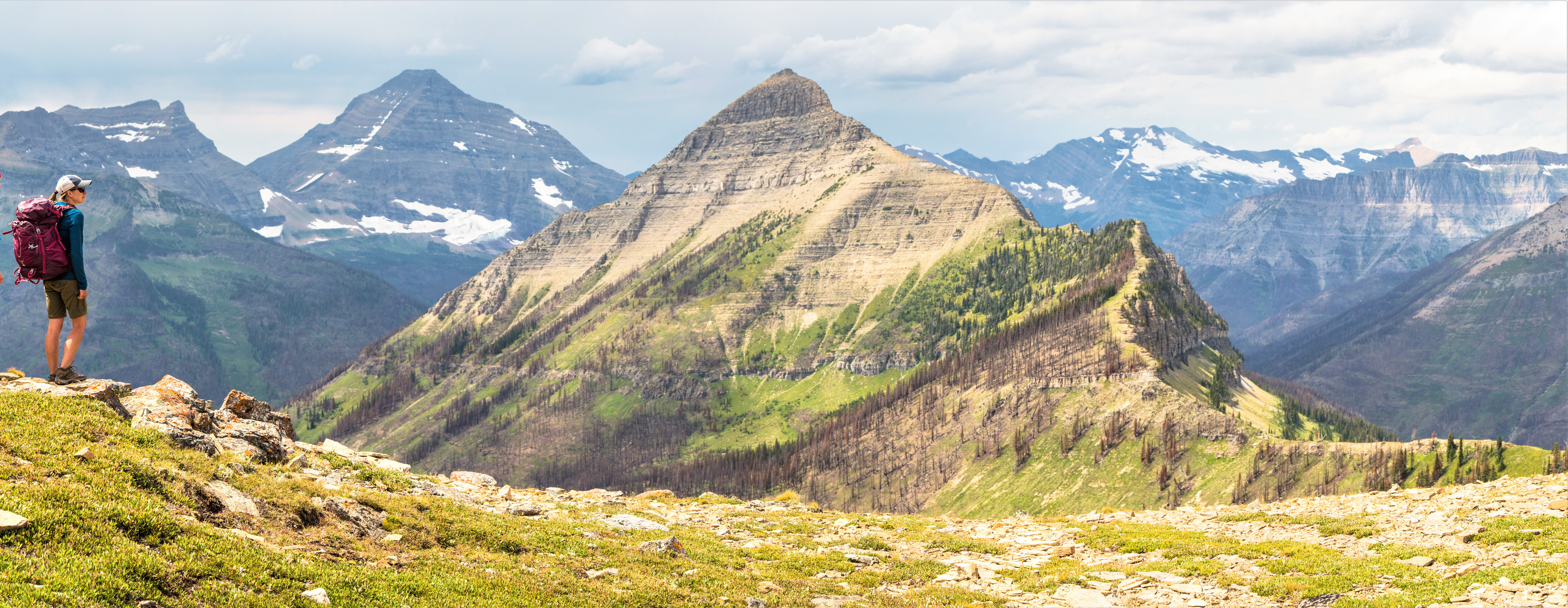
Tinkham Mountain from Cutbank Pass
