= Natural resources of the Republic of Ireland =

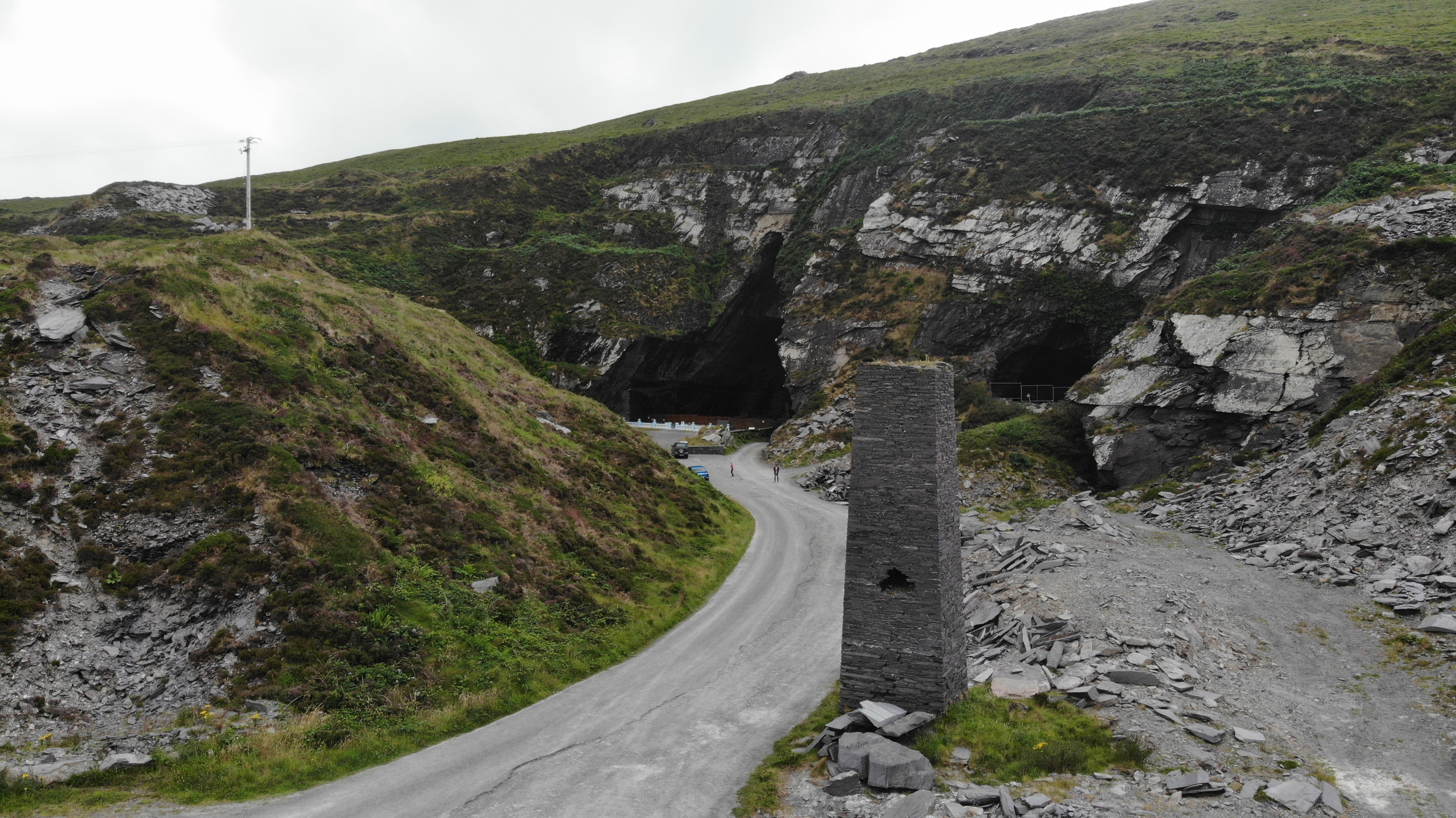
Entrance to Valentia Slate Quarry

The primary natural resources of the Republic of Ireland include natural gas, petroleum, peat, copper, lead, dolomite, barite, limestone, gypsum, silver and zinc. Key industries based on these and other natural resources include fishing, mining, and various forms of agriculture and fish farming. The Department of Communications, Energy and Natural Resources is charged with the legislative protection of Ireland's natural resources.

== Mining ==
The historic and archaeological record of the island demonstrates a history of mining dating to Bronze Age Ireland, when the south was an important copper producer – including from sites at Ross Island, Kerry, Allihies, Cork and later Bunmahon, Waterford.

Mining became more industrialised during the Industrial Revolution, and gold mining experienced some growth – including a "gold rush" in the late 18th and early 19th centuries at Gold Mines River, Wicklow. Later 20th and 21st century gold-mining plans were met with significant opposition owing to the expected environmental impact.

By the late 20th century, Ireland became a significant player in the industry, ranking highly in a Fraser Institute survey. As of 2007, Ireland produced 38% of Western Europe's zinc and 25% of its lead, from lead and zinc mines including Lisheen Mine, Tipperary, Tara Mine, Meath, and Galmoy Mine, Kilkenny.

As of the 21st century, mining companies operating in Ireland include Anglo-American plc, Arcon, New Boliden, Conroy Diamonds and Gold, Hereward Ventures plc, Minco Mining & Metals Corporation, and others.

Primary raw material industries in Ireland include those involving steel, lead, zinc, silver, aluminium, barite, and gypsum mining processing. Heavy industry relying on these materials is centered around key port cities such as Dublin, Cork, and Belfast (the latter in Northern Ireland).

== Energy sources ==
=== Peat ===
Peat has been Ireland's staple fuel for centuries and as of 2005 it provided about 9% of the country's energy needs. Peatlands cover approximately 17% of the area of Ireland, and Bord na Móna (the "Peat Board") is a semi-state company charged with the mechanised harvesting of peat – extracting more than 4 million tonnes in 2014. Bord na Móna reduced peat harvesting in 2017 and implemented a "Brown to Green" transition to eliminate peat harvesting from 2018. In recent years, peat harvesting has been continued by individuals who generally use the fuel in their domestic fireplaces and appliances.

=== Gas ===
Major fossil fuel finds include the Kinsale Head gas field and Corrib gas field. The latter entails the extraction of gas from a natural gas deposit off the northwest coast of Ireland. The project includes a development of the Corrib gas field, and constructions of the natural gas pipeline and a gas processing plant. The Corrib project attracted significant and sustained controversy owing to concerns about its environmental impact, safety issues (due to proximity to residential areas), alleged planning irregularities, debate on the conditions in which private interests benefit from state resources, and the perceived poor contribution that the project returns to the economy. A number of groups, notably the Rossport Five and Shell to Sea campaign, gained national attention for their opposition to the project. While, as of 2024, the Corrib gas field had been substantially depleted, an adjacent gas find called Iniskea is seeking to connect to the Corrib subsea infrastructure and maintain the jobs and onshore investment in County Mayo.

=== Oil ===
An Irish oil exploration company called Providence Resources announced in July 2012 that it had discovered a field with in excess of 1 billion barrels of oil at the Barryroe oil well, 70 km from the coast of County Cork. Providence later revised the amount of oil obtainable to approximately 300 million barrels, worth several billions of euro. Providence has interests in other Irish oil and gas fields, including one off the coast of Spanish Point in Clare. Other potential offshore oil and gas fields have yet to be explored for viability.

=== Renewable resources ===
Ireland's experience with state-sponsored renewable energy projects dates from 1925, and the Ardnacrusha project. Other new and renewable energy projects include hydroelectric, solar, and wind power initiatives, including one of the country's first wind farms at Bellacorick in 1992.

== Agriculture, aquaculture and forestry ==
Farming (including livestock rearing, dairy products, cereals, potatoes), is a key contributor to the Economy of Ireland. In 2005, Ireland exported approximately €7.3 billion worth of agri-food and drink (about 8.6% of its exports), mainly as cattle, beef, and dairy products, and mainly to the United Kingdom (including Northern Ireland). Agriculture products include turnips, barley, potatoes, wheat, beef, and dairy products. The warmer and more moist conditions in the south and southwest have the potential to support other crops – including soybeans.

The fishing grounds around Ireland's territorial seas and waters include the Irish Conservation Box – a 100,000 km^{2} zone specifically protected from overfishing. In addition, Ireland has many thousands of kilometres of fish-bearing rivers and lakes. These fresh water habitats support native fish species including char, eel, brown trout, perch, pike, pollan, and roach. The North Atlantic Drift warms the waters off the coast, increasing the number of warm water fish species caught offshore.

Ireland has amongst the lowest forest cover of all European countries, with 11% coverage compared to a European average of over 30%. Coillte is the state-sponsored entity responsible for forestry management – it is responsible to the Minister for Agriculture, Food and the Marine and Minister for Finance.

Mushrooms are a significant industry in Ireland and one that bears the significant exposure from Brexit negotiations. Irish producers grow around 70,000 tons of mushrooms each year, 80% of which are sold in the UK, for a value of €120 million each year. Fresh mushrooms need to be sold very quickly after harvest, about 5 to 7 days. The industry is heavily dependent on the open border between Northern Ireland and the Republic of Ireland with producers poised close to the border and working together on a cross-border basis to purchase supplies and transport their harvested produce.

== Legislation affecting natural resource management ==
=== Wildlife Act of 1976 ===
The Wildlife Act 1976 sought to protect certain wildlife (including game) and flora. Under its terms, the Wildlife Advisory Council (later abolished in 1987) was established, responsible for wildlife reserves, protection of breeding grounds, herd management, and migration. The act also covered new legislation relating to land, inland waters and territorial waters. The act was amended several times. The first in 1985 sought to manage and protect birds, and the second in 1986 added controls on wild bird species. The Wildlife (Amendment) Act 2000 provided protection for Natural Heritage Areas as well as legislation relating to hunting of birds in protected forests.

=== Forestry Act 1988 ===
The Forestry Act 1988, made provisions for the enlargement of forestry in the state, and provided the establishment of a company – later named Coillte – which was mandated with the management of state owned forests, and with providing grant aid to commercial and privately owned forest farming and planted woodland. It was amended on 15 August 2000.

=== Sea Pollution Act 1991 ===
Originally constituted on 11 August 1959, the Sea Pollution Act set out to prevent the pollution of the sea, gave effect to the International Convention for the Prevention of Pollution from Ships, and related matters. Also included was the maintenance of marine pollution, oil pollution, and waste water.

=== Protection of the Environment Act 2003 ===
The Protection of the Environment 2003 provided for the execution of Directive 96/61/EC concerning integrated pollution prevention and control. It also amended the Environmental Protection Agency Act of 1992 and the Waste Management Act of 1996 and the Litter Pollution Act 1997. It mainly sought to prevent water pollution and protect land and soil quality.

=== Fisheries acts ===
The Fisheries (Amendment) Act 2001 sought to modify and extend the Fisheries (Amendment) Act 1997; to confirm fees for certain fish culture and aquaculture licenses. The Fisheries (Amendment) Act 2001 sought to support the United Nations Convention on the Law of the Sea. This related to the conservation and management of fish stocks; licensing of sea-fishing boats, to amend the Foreshore Act 1933, the Fisheries Acts 1959 to 2001 and the Merchant Shipping (Certification of Seamen) Act of 1979.
