= List of mines in Brazil =

This is a list of mines in Brazil organized by mineral.

== Bauxite ==
- Paragominas mine — Pará

== Gold ==
- Chapada — Goiás
- Jacobina mine — Bahia
- Morro Velho — Nova Lima, Minas Gerais
- Paracatu — Minas Gerais
- Serra Grande — Crixás, Goiás
- Serra Pelada — Pará

== Iron ore ==
- Alegria mine — Minas Gerais
- Anglo Ferrous Metals (AFM) Minas-Rio Project — Minas Gerais
- Carajás Mine — Parauapebas, Pará
- Corumbá (mine) — Corumbá, Mato Grosso do Sul
- Serra Sul (S11D) — near Canaã dos Carajás, Pará

== Manganese ==
- Azul mine — Pará

== Tungsten ==
- Currais Novos — Northeast Region, Brazil

== See also ==
- List of mines
- List of companies of Brazil
