= Golden, County Tipperary =

Golden Irish: An Gabhailín
- Village
- Location in Ireland
- Coordinates: 52°29′54″N 7°58′51″W
- Country: Ireland
- Province: Munster
- County: County Tipperary

Population (2016)
  - Total: 267
- Time zone: UTC+0 (WET)
  - Summer (DST): UTC-1 (IST (WEST))

Golden (Irish: An Gabhailín) is a village in County Tipperary in Ireland. The village is situated on the River Suir. It is located between the towns of Cashel and Tipperary on the N74 road. In older times the village was known as Goldenbridge. It is also a parish in the Roman Catholic Archdiocese of Cashel and Emly, and is in the historical barony of Clanwilliam.

== History ==
The bridge at Golden, which straddles an island in the River Suir, was the scene of an event of some significance in 1690, when King William III renewed, by letter in his own hand, the Royal Charter of the city of Cashel as an act of gratitude to the people of Cashel for the hospitality received by his followers following their attack on Limerick. There is a medieval castle on the island, currently in a ruinous state. Located in the castle ruins is a memorial sculptured bust of Thomas MacDonagh (1878–1916), Tipperary-born poet and leader of the Easter Rising in 1916.

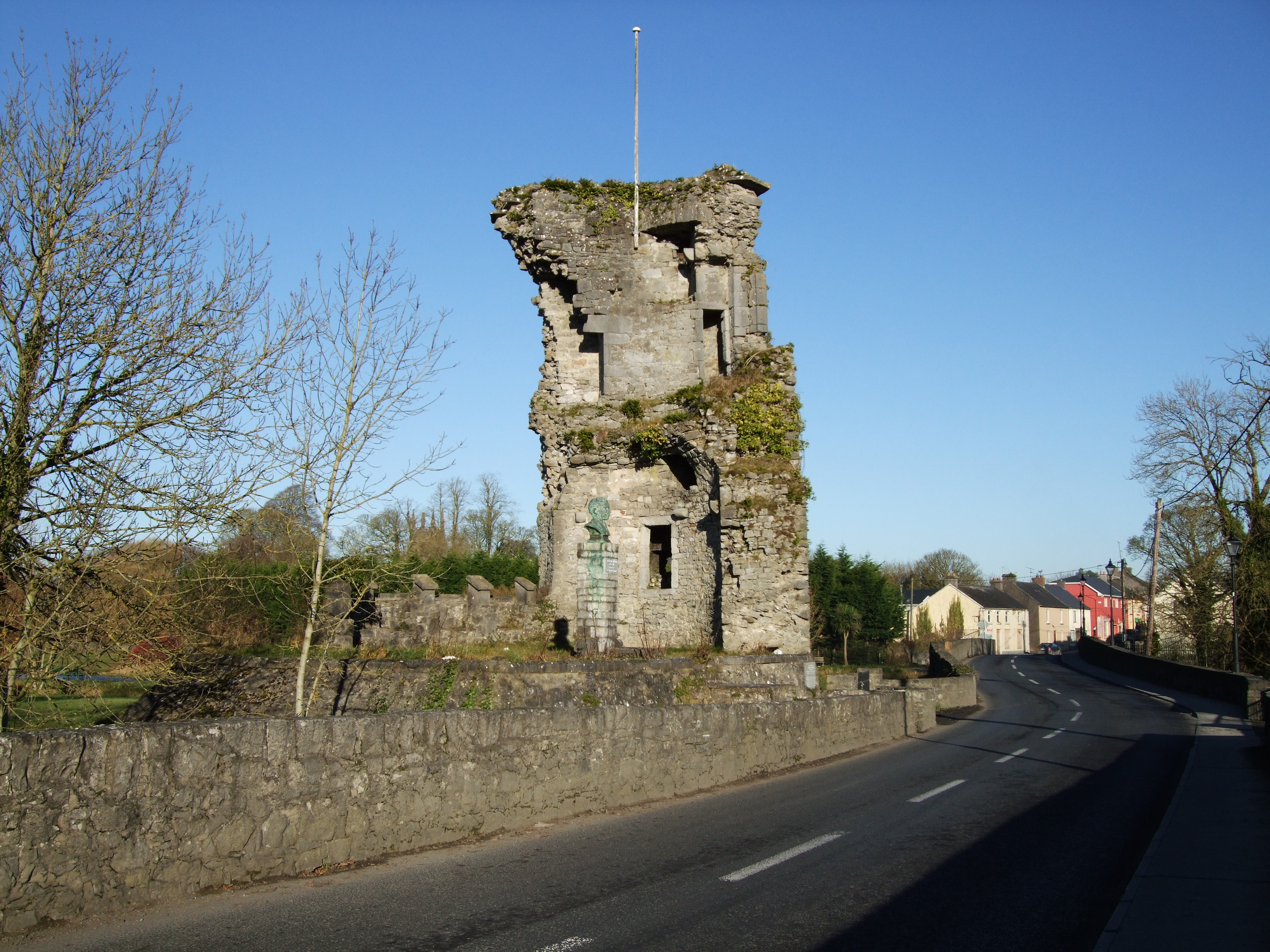
Medieval castle on island in the River Suir

The Augustinian Athassel Priory is located south of the village. The abbey was founded by William de Burgh in the last decades of the 12th century. It was once the largest abbey in Ireland and was surrounded by a small town named Athassel which was burned twice, in 1319 by Lord Maurice Fitzthomas and in 1419 by Bryan O'Brien. No fragment of the settlement survives today, though an aerial survey exposes to view, a faint tracery of old foundations close to the Abbey ruin.

Father Theobold Mathew, OFM (Cap), was born at Thomastown Castle, close to Golden on 10 October 1790. It is also sometimes claimed that Rathclogheen House, close to the castle, was the place of his birth – that residence being part of the extensive family estate of the Mathew family, Earls Landaff. Father Mathew was the best known Irish temperance reformer and founded the Abstinence Society in 1838 and became widely known as the "Apostle of Temperance". To mark the centenary of the foundation of the society, a statue in his honour was raised at Thomastown Cross in 1938 and is a visible landmark on the N74 road, west of Golden.

Golden was once home to the Judkin-Fitzgerald baronets of Lisheen. Sir John Judkin-Fitzgerald, the second baronet and first of the family to live here was also Mayor of Cashel and Sheriff of Tipperary. The third baronet, Sir Thomas Judkin-Fitzgerald's residence was located just outside of Golden in the townland of Golden Hills.

== Amenities ==
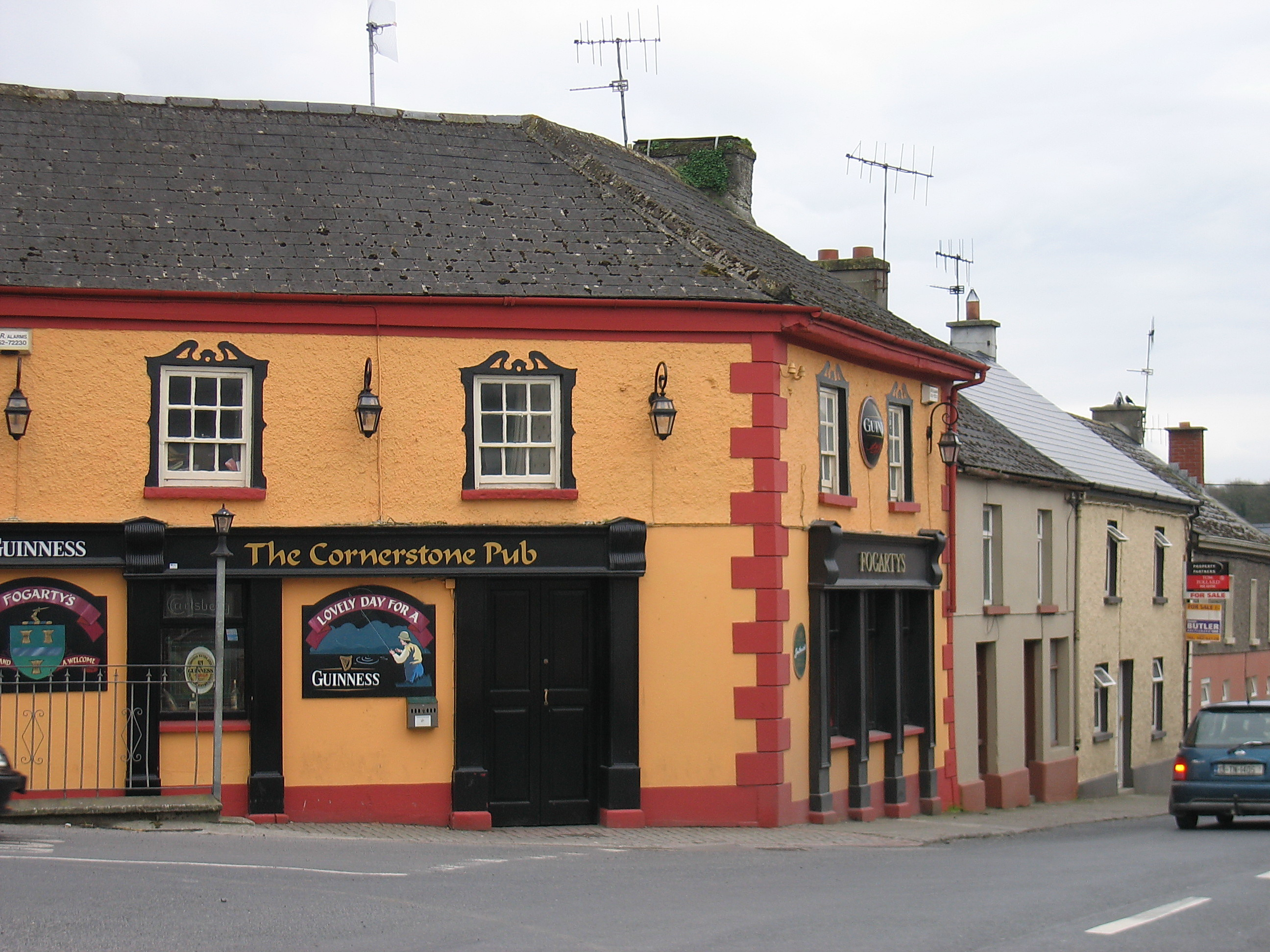
Main Street, Golden

The local church, the Church of the Blessed Sacrament, is in the parish of Golden & Kilfeacle in the Roman Catholic Archdiocese of Cashel and Emly.

There are two hamlets close by at Kilfeacle and Thomastown, the latter being an estate village which co-existed with the demesne of Thomastown Castle, home of the Matthew family, Earls of Llandaff. The valley of the Suir is a fertile agricultural area and is part of the region known as the "Golden Vale". The N74 connects Golden with Tipperary Town and Cashel, while the L3121 links it with the nearby village of New Inn.

Golden contains a sports field, home to the local club of the Gaelic Athletic Association, Golden–Kilfeacle, once called the Golden Fontenoys. The club's facilities include an indoor hall and floodlighting.

The village, which had a population a population of 267 as of the 2016 census, is home to a number of local businesses including an agricultural museum, a dog cafe, butchers, a supermarket and several public houses.

== See also ==
- List of museums in the Republic of Ireland
