= Lundin Mining =

Mining company in Canada

Lundin Mining Corporation
- Formerly: South Atlantic Ventures; South Atlantic Resources; South Atlantic Diamonds
- Type: Public company
- Traded as: TSX: LUN; S&P/TSX Composite Index component
- Industry: Mining
- Founded: September 9, 1994; 32 years ago
- Founder: Adolf Lundin
- Headquarters: Vancouver, British Columbia, Canada
- Key people: Jack Lundin (CEO, 2023–present)
- Products: Copper, gold, silver, nickel
- Website: lundinmining.com

Lundin Mining Corporation, headquartered in Vancouver, owns and operates mines that produce base metals such as gold, silver, copper, and nickel. The company's major properties are the copper mines of Candelaria (Note: 80% interest, the remaining 20% is owned by Sumitomo Group.) and Caserones (Note: 70% interest, the remaining 30% is owned by JX Nippon Mining & Metals.) in Atacama Region, Chile, the Chyapada gold-silver-copper mine in Goiás, Brazil and the Eagle nickel-copper mine in Michigan, United States. Besides productive mines Lundin Mining owns a 50% interest in the exploratory projects of Filo del Sol and Josemaria near the Argentina–Chile border in partnership with BHP. Approximately 15.4% of the company is owned by affiliates of the billionaire Lundin family.

== History ==
The company was founded in 1994 by Adolf Lundin as South Atlantic Diamonds Corp for the purpose of investing in a diamond mine in Brazil. The company changed its name to South Atlantic Resources acquired a 39% ownership interest in North Atlantic Natural Resources, which explored the Storliden and Norrbotten mineral deposits in northern Sweden. Along with Boliden AB, the Storliden mine was developed and began producing zinc and copper in 2002. In March 2002, the company was renamed South Atlantic Ventures and raised funding on the Nasdaq Stockholm in December 2003 and then on the Toronto Stock Exchange in August 2004.

In June 2004, the company acquired the Zinkgruvan mine (zinc-lead-silver; Zinkgruvan, Örebro County, Sweden) from Rio Tinto for US$100 million and in August 2004, the company was renamed Lundin Mining. That was the first year the company recorded attributable mineral production, with over 150,000 tonnes of zinc, 2 million ounces of silver, along with lead and copper produced. The silver from the mine was attributed to Wheaton Precious Metals based on precious metals streaming contracts.

In March 2005, the company acquired Arcon International Resources and its Galmoy Mine (zinc-lead-silver mine; County Kilkenny, Ireland) for US$63 million in cash and a 14% ownership stake in Lundin Mining. It acquired full ownership of the Storliden mine.

In October 2006, the company acquired Eurozinc, owner of the Neves-Corvo mine (silver-copper-zinc-lead mine; Alentejo Region, Portugal). In April 2007, it acquired Tenke Mining, owner of a 24% stake in the Tenke Fungurume Mine which was being developed by Phelps Dodge. In July 2007, it acquired Rio Narcea Gold Mines, which owned the Aguablanca mine (nickel-copper; Province of Guadalajara, Spain).

In March 2008, the Storlinden mine ceased production due to depletion of reserves.

In June 2008, the company moved its headquarters from Vancouver to Toronto.

In late 2008, the company entered into a merger agreement with Hudbay, which at the time owned 20% of Lundin Mining. However, the proposed transaction failed to receive investor support due to the 2008 financial crisis and was terminated in February 2009; Hudbay sold its stake in Lundin in May 2009.

In May 2009, the company shut the Galmoy mine. This was earlier than planned due to a drop in zinc prices during the Great Recession.

In 2011, the company proposed a merger with Inmet Mining; however the deal was terminated after failing to gain shareholder support. That year, Equinox Minerals launched a hostile takeover of Lundin; however, it too failed to receive support of its shareholders and was terminated.

In January 2013, the company acquired a 24% interest in a cobalt refinery in Kokkola, Finland. In July 2013, the company acquired the Eagle Mine project in Michigan from Rio Tinto for $325 million; it began production in 2014. In October 2014, it acquired Freeport-McMoRan's 80% ownership stake in the Candelaria mine in Chile for US$1.8 billion.

In November 2016, the company sold the Aguablanca mine to Sacyr.

In April 2017, the company sold its interest in the Tenke Fungurume Mine for $1.5 billion to BHR Partners as part of a larger deal between Freeport-McMoRan and China Molybdenum. That month, the company also sold the Galmoy mine to Lanes Group.

In June 2019, it sold its stake in the Kokkola cobalt refinery to Umicore for $150 million.

In 2016, the company joined the United Nations Global Compact for corporate sustainability.

In 2018, the company attempted to acquire Nevsun Resources but was outbid by Zijin Mining.

In 2019, the company acquired the open-pit Chapada mine in Brazil from Yamana Gold for US$1 billion.

In 2022, Lundin Mining acquired Josemaria Resources (copper-gold; San Juan Province, Argentina; under development) for C$625 million in cash and stock.

In 2023, the company moved its headquarters back to Vancouver.

In March 2023, the company acquired a 51% interest in the Caserones copper-molybdenum mine from JX Nippon Mining & Metals for $950 million. Ownership was later increased to 70% for a payment of $350 million pursuant to an option.

In July 2024, in a 50/50 joint venture, BHP and Lundin Mining acquired the Filo del Sol (gold-silver; San Juan Province, Argentina and Atacama Region, Chile) and Lundin contributed Josemaria Resources to the joint venture.

In April 2025, Lundin sold the Neves-Corvo mine and the Zinkgruvan mine to Boliden AB for US$1.4 billion plus up to an additional US$150 million in contingency payments.

In September 2025 the First Environmental Court of Antofagasta ordered the closure of the copper mine of Alcaparrosa in Chile whose controlling company, Minera Ojos del Salado, is owned in 80% by Lundin Mining. In 2022 the mine had damaged the local aquifer system by developing a hydraulic connection with it which caused the appearance of a large sinkhole on agricultural fields in the surface.

In November 2025, the Supreme Court of Canada allowed a class action lawsuit by Lundlin's investors against the company for the late disclosure of a 2017 rockslide at its Candelaria copper mine in Chile. Despite detecting an instability in the wall of the open pit mine days before a 700,000 metric tonnes collapse, it only disclosed it just under a month later. The day after the announcement, the stock had fallen 16% and lost more than $1 billion USD in market capitalization. The court set aside a lower court ruling on the definition of "material information" that had denied the class action.

=== Management history ===
==== Chief executive officers ====
- Edward F. Posey (1998-2005)
- Karl-Axel Waplan (2005–2008)
- Phil Wright (2008–2011)
- Paul Conibear (2011–2018)
- Marie Inkster (2018–2021)
- Peter Rockandel (2021–2023)
- Jack Lundin (2023–present)

==== Chairmen ====
- Lukas Lundin (1997-2022)
