= Copiapó (disambiguation) =

Copiapó is a city and commune in Chile.

The term may also refer to:

- Copiapó River
- Copiapó Valley
- Copiapó Province
- Atacama Province, formerly Copiapó Department
- Copiapó Volcano
- 2006 Copiapó mining accident
- 2010 Copiapó mining accident
- Version 1.6 of the QGIS application
