= Alcaparrosa =

Copper mine in Chile

- Location within Atacama Region Location within Chile

Location
- Location: Tierra Amarilla, Atacama Region, Chile; 27°27′55.25″S 70°16′31.39″W

Production
- Products: Copper

Owner
- Company: Minera Ojos del Salado: Lundin Mining (80%); Sumitomo Group (20%)

The Alcaparrosa is an underground copper mine located in the Copiapó Valley of northern Chile. More precisely it lies in the inland commune of Tierra Amarilla in the Atacama Region. The mine is owned by the Sociedad Contractual Minera Minera Ojos del Salado which is owned in 80% by Lundin Mining and in 20% by Sumitomo Group. The life of mine ore grade of Alcaparrosa was estimated at 0.94% copper as of 2016.

In July 30 2022 a "non-natural hydraulic connection" between the mine and a local aquifer that had formed as consequence of mining activity caused the formation of a 32x33 m wide and 64-m deep sinkhole in a nearby agricultural field. As consequence of this Consejo de Defensa del Estado sued Minera Ojos del Salado and in September 2025 the First Environmental Court of Antofagasta ordered its closure. The court also ordered the sinkhole to be filled.
