= List of mines in the Republic of Ireland =

The following list of mines in Ireland is subsidiary to the lists of mines articles. This list contains working, defunct and proposed mines in the country and is organised by the primary mineral output(s).

== Mines ==
=== Coal mines ===
- Arigna Coal Mine, see also Arigna Mining Experience
- Ballingarry Coal Mines
- Deerpark Mines
- Drumskehey Colliery
- Coalbrook & Drominagh Colliery
- Drominagh Colliery
- Dromagh Colliery
- Lisnacon Colliery

=== Copper mines ===
- Allihies, see also Allihies Copper Mine Museum
- Mount Gabriel Bronze Age copper mine

=== Lead mines ===
- Ballycorus Leadmines
- Galmoy Mine
- Lisheen Mine
- Tara Mine

=== Zinc mines ===
- Galmoy Mine
- Lisheen Mine
- Tara Mine

== Mining companies ==
Historically, mines were operated privately, but in 1824 an Act of Parliament established the Mining Company of Ireland.

In the 21st century, mining companies operating in Ireland include:

- Boliden AB - Boliden operates the Tara zinc-lead-silver mine in County Meath, the largest zinc mine in Europe.
- Conroy Gold and Natural Resources - Developing the Clontibret gold project of Co. Monaghan.
- Minco Exploration - Minco engages in base metals exploration in Counties Galway, Meath, and Westmeath.

== See also ==
- Irish gold
