= Royal College of Science for Ireland =

Former institute of higher education in Dublin

Coordinates: 53.339282°N 6.254187°W

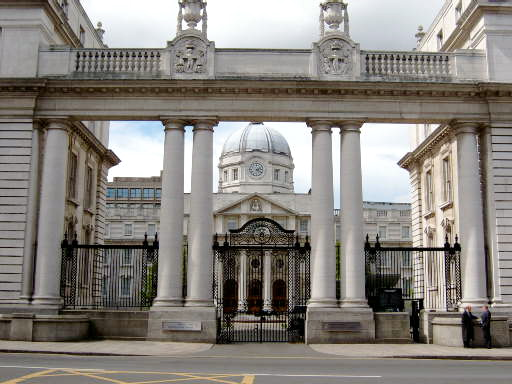
- The Royal College of Science building from 1911 to 1926; now Government Buildings
- Type: Public
- Active: 1867–1926
- Location: Dublin, Ireland (later Irish Free State)

The Royal College of Science for Ireland (RCScI) was an institute for higher education in Dublin which existed from 1867 to 1926, specialising in physical sciences and applied science. It was originally based on St Stephen's Green, moving in 1911 to a purpose-built Royal College of Science building on Merrion Street, now known as Government Buildings. In 1926 it was absorbed into University College Dublin (UCD) as the faculty of Science and Engineering.

== Foundation ==
The Museum of Economic Geology was founded by the Dublin Castle administration in 1845, with chemist Robert Kane as curator, and a focus on mining in Ireland similar to the Museum of Practical Geology in London. In 1847, Kane was promoted to director, expanding its remit, and renaming it the Museum of Irish Industry (MII). In 1853 a new Science and Art Department was created within the Whitehall administration, and in 1854 the MII placed under its remit. A School of Science applied to Mining and the Arts was created, modelled on the Royal School of Mines in London, with four professorships shared jointly by the MII school and the Royal Dublin Society (RDS). The MII and School shared premises at 51 St Stephen's Green, acquired in 1846 and fitted out by 1852. In 1864, a select committee of the UK parliament recommended that the MII and School be entirely separated from the RDS and broadened into a government-supported College of Science for Ireland. In 1865, HM Treasury agreed and in 1867 a commission was appointed by the education committee of the Privy Council. The commission, headed by William Parsons, 3rd Earl of Rosse, outlined the scope and functions of the proposed college, and the RCScI mission statement on 11 September 1867 was:

The object of the Royal College of Science is to supply as far as practicable a Complete Course of instruction in Science applicable to the Industrial Arts, especially those which may be classed broadly under the heads of Mining, Agriculture, Engineering, and Manufactures, and to aid in the instruction of Teachers for the local Schools of Science

George Sigerson complained in 1868 that the RCScI was less open to Catholics than the MII had been.

== Later development ==
The RCScI's remit was later changed to exclude agriculture and include "Physics and Natural Science". The number of students enrolled increased gradually.

Students enrolled in RCScI day courses
Year ending	1869	1879	1889	1899	1909	1919
Number enrolled	32	60	103	97	117	258

By 1898 the RCScI had chairs of Mining and Mineralogy, Physics, Chemistry, Zoology, Botany, Geology, Applied Mathematics and Mechanism, Descriptive Geometry and Engineering. In 1900, control was transferred from the Science and Art Department in London to the Department of Agriculture and Technical Instruction in Dublin, headed by Horace Plunkett. A new building was proposed in 1897 and a site from Merrion Street to Kildare Street was chosen in 1898; in 1899 the plan was extended to include government administrative offices as well as the new college. The new building was designed by Sir Aston Webb; the foundation stone was laid in 1904 by Edward VII and it was opened in 1911 by George V.

In 1926 the RCScI was absorbed into UCD where it became the UCD Science and Engineering faculties. Science moved to UCD's Earlsfort Terrace building, and on to Belfield in the 1960s; Engineering moved from Merrion Street to Belfield in 1989. The RCScI building was then absorbed into Government Buildings with the rest of Aston Webb's complex, lavishly renovated by Charles Haughey and used to house the Department of the Taoiseach.
