= N74 =

N74 may refer to:

== Roads ==
- Route des Grands Crus, in France
- N74 road (Ireland)
- Surigao–Davao Coastal Road, in the Philippines
- Nebraska Highway 74, in the United States

== Other uses ==
- N74 (Long Island bus)
- BMW N74, an automobile engine
- London Buses route N74
- HMS Rorqual (N74), a submarine of the Royal Navy
- Ndjébbana language
- Northrop N-74, a proposed transport aircraft
- Penns Cave Airport, near Centre Hall, Pennsylvania, United States
