= Wildlife Act =

Wildlife Act may refer to:

- Wildlife Act 1953 in New Zealand
- Wildlife Act 1976, Ireland
- Wildlife Act 2000, Ireland
- Wildlife and Countryside Act 1981, of the United Kingdom
- Canada Wildlife Act
- Wildlife Protection Act of 1972, India
- Fish and Wildlife Act, United States
- National Parks and Wildlife Act 1974 (NSW), Australia
- Wildlife Conservation Act 1950, Western Australia
- National Parks and Wildlife Act 1972, South Australia
