= Yamana Gold =

Canadian-based gold producer

Yamana Gold Inc.
- Formerly: Yamana Resources
- Type: Subsidiary
- Traded as: TSX: YRI; NYSE: AUY
- Industry: Mining
- Founded: March 17, 1994
- Headquarters: Toronto, Ontario, Canada
- Key people: Victor Bradley (CEO, 1994–2003); Peter Marrone (CEO, 2003–2018); Daniel Racine (CEO, 2018–current)
- Products: Gold, silver
- Revenue: ▼$1.612 billion (2019); ▼$1.799 billion (2018); ▲$1.804 billion (2017
- Number of employees: 5,372
- Parent: Pan American Silver
- Subsidiaries: Canadian Malartic Corporation; Minera Yamana Chile SpA; Estelar Resources S.A. (Argentina); Jacobina Mineração e Comercio Ltd. (Brazil)
- Website: www.yamana.com

Yamana Gold Inc. was a Canadian company that owned and operated gold, silver and copper mines in Canada, Chile, Brazil and Argentina. Headquartered in Toronto, the company was founded in 1994 and became listed on the Toronto Stock Exchange in 1995, the New York Stock Exchange in 2007, and the London Stock Exchange in 2020. The company became a gold producer after its 2003 re-restructuring in which Peter Marrone took over as chief executive officer and it merged with Brazilian company Santa Elina Mines Corporation. The combined company was able to use Yamana's access to capital with Santa Elina development properties to bring the Chapada mine into production. From there, the company combined with other TSX-listed companies RNC Gold, Desert Sun Mining, Viceroy Exploration, Northern Orion Resources, Meridian Gold, Osisko Mining and Extorre Gold Mines which each contributed either a producing mine or a development project that was able to come into commercial production. Yamana was acquired by Pan American Silver in March 2023.

Yamana produced over 1 million ounces of gold per year between 2009 and 2016 until it spun off Brio Gold as a separate company with several of its Brazilian assets. With the company facing criticism for its executive compensation packages and debt load, Daniel Racine replaced Marrone as CEO in 2018 and the company sold its Chapada and Gualcamayo mines.

Yamana was recognized for its environmental, social, and governance (ESG) performance. In 2021, Yamana Gold was named as one of Canada's Best 50 corporate citizens by Corporate Knights.

== Corporate history ==
Minera Yamana was founded on March 19, 1994, headquartered in Toronto and headed by Victor Bradley as chief executive officer (CEO), as a mineral exploration company focused on properties within Argentina. The private company went public, effective February 7, 1995, through a reverse takeover of Toronto Stock Exchange-listed of Wiscan Resources Inc. with the combined company emerging with the new name Yamana Resources Inc. The company acquired and assessed numerous mineral properties in South America and Indonesia until 2000 when it settled on developing a silver mine in Santa Cruz Province, Argentina. However, the company was unable to manage the development phase and was forced to sell the property in April 2002 to avoid bankruptcy.

Yamana restructured in July–August 2003 with its new CEO, Peter Marrone. In addition to changing its name to Yamana Gold Inc., incorporating a subsidiary in the British Virgin Islands, and consolidating its shares on a 28:1 basis, Yamana acquired the Brazilian company Santa Elina Mines Corporation. In exchange for stock ownership in Yamana Gold, Santa Elina ownership of the Fazenda Nova, São Francisco, and Chapada development projects were transferred to Yamana. In the same month, they also purchased the aging Fazenda Brasileiro gold mine from Companhia Vale do Rio Doce, immediately making Yamana a gold producer. Investment decisions to commence construction on the three Santa Elina projects were made in 2004, with the Fazenda Nova mine achieving commercial production in 2005 followed by São Francisco and Chapada mines in 2006.

Marrone continued to quickly expand Yamana in 2006 by merging with TSX-listed RNC Gold which owned two small gold mines in Nicaragua and had recently acquired the San Andrés mine in Honduras, and then with TSX and AMEX-listed Desert Sun Mining Corp for its Jacobina mine in Brazil, and then with TSX-listed Viceroy Exploration for its Gualcamayo exploration project in Argentina. Along with Northern Orion Resources, the company spent 2007 engaged in a hostile takeover of Meridian Gold. Meridian had resisted, the merger was agreed to after Yamana increased their offer to $3.5 billion (in cash and shares). Yamana had increased their gold production numbers from 101,000 ounces of gold in 2004 to 597,304 oz in 2007, to 1,201,200 oz in 2009.

Yamana continued to produce over a million ounces of gold each year, even though it sold the San Andrés, Sao Francisco and Sao Vicente mines to Victor Bradley's Aura Minerals in late-2009. The Gualcamayo mine achieved production in July 2009 followed by the Mercedes mine in February 2012. In 2014, Yamana formed a joint venture with Agnico Eagle Mines Limited to make a white knight bid for Osisko Mining Corporation who was in the midst of fighting a hostile takeover by Goldcorp; Yamana emerged with a 50% stake in the Canadian Malartic Corporation which would quickly surpass Meridian's El Peñón mine as their most productive gold producer. Yamana would fall under the one million ounces of gold in 2017 as they spun off Brio Gold as a separate company with control of the Fazenda Brasileiro mine and several development projects. The company's next mine, the Cerro Moro mine in Argentina, acquired as a development project in Yamana's 2012 acquisition of Extorre Gold Mines, began production in 2018.

By 2018, Yamana had accumulated a high debt load of US$1.6 billion, mostly from Canadian Malartic, and taken criticism from industry analysts and shareholders for its excessive executive compensation packages. That year Daniel Racine succeeded Marrone as CEO, with Marrone staying with the company on staff and on the board, as Executive Chairman. The next year, Yamana sold the Chapada copper-gold mine to Lundin Mining for $800 million and its Gualcamayo mine to Colombian company Mineros S.A. for $85 million to pay down its debt.

Yamana was acquired by Pan American Silver in March 2023 in a deal worth nearly US$4.8 billion.

== Mining operations ==
Along with several exploration and development properties, as of 2020, Yamana Gold operates five gold mines:

- The Canadian Malartic gold-silver mine, located in Quebec, was acquired as a producing mine in 2014 as a 50/50 joint venture with Agnico Eagle Mines Limited. It is an open pit mine that uses cyanidation following by electrowinning and smelting to produce doré bars.
- The El Peñón gold-silver mine, located in the Atacama Desert of the Antofagasta Province, Chile, was acquired as a producing mine in 2007 as a result of Yamana's acquisition of Meridian Gold. It uses principally underground mining to target specific veins and the Merrill–Crowe process with a precipitate furnace to produce doré bars.
- The Minera Florida gold-silver-zinc mine, located in the Santiago Metropolitan Region of Chile, was acquired from Yamana's acquisition of Meridian Gold. It uses principally underground mining to target specific veins with ore being processed in a Carbon in pulp system and doré bars being produced through electrowinning.
- The Jacobina gold mine, located in Bahia, Brazil, was acquired as a producing mine in 2006 as a result of Yamana's acquisition of in the Desert Sun Mining. It uses principally underground mining to target specific veins with ore being processed in a Carbon in pulp system and doré bars being produced through electrowinning.
- The Cerro Moro gold-silver mine, located in Santa Cruz Province, Argentina, was brought into production by Yamana in 2018 after the mineral property was acquired in the Yamana's acquisition of Extorre Gold Mines Limited in 2012. The mine is a combined open pit and underground operation that uses the Merrill–Crowe process to produce doré bars.

=== Past operations ===
- The Chapada gold-silver-copper mine, located in Goiás, Brazil, was acquired by Yamana Gold as part of its 2003 re-structuring. The mine began producing gold, silver and copper for Yamana Gold in February 2007 until it was sold in 2019.
- The Gualcamayo gold mine, located in San Juan Province, Argentina, was acquired as a development project with Yamana's merger with Viceroy Exploration. Yamana brought it into production in 2009 and operated it for 10 years before selling it to another mining company.
- The Fazenda Brasileiro gold mine, located in Bahia, Brazil, was Yamana's first operating mine. Purchased from Vale in 2003, Yamana relinquished control in 2017 as part of the spin off of Brio Gold as a separate company.
- The Mercedes gold-silver mine, located in Sonora, Mexico, was Meridian Gold's development project that Yamana brought into production in 2012. The mine was sold to Premier Gold Inc. in 2016.
- The Fazenda Nova Mine was a small gold mine in Goiás, Brazil, which was among the first properties acquired in Yamana's 2003 re-structuring. It was the first mine the company developed itself. It was opened in 2004 with only a four-year expected mine life and was subsequently placed in care and maintenance.
- The São Francisco gold mine in Mato Grosso, Brazil, was also among the first properties acquired in Yamana's 2003 re-structuring. It was developed by the company and operated from 2006 until its sale to Aura Minerals in 2009.

== Carbon footprint ==
Yamana Gold reported Total CO2e emissions (Direct + Indirect) for 31 December 2020 at 180 Kt (-116 /-39.2% y-o-y).

Yamana Gold's Total CO2e emissions (Direct + Indirect) (in kilotonnes)
Dec 2019	Dec 2020
296	180
