= Sir Thomas Judkin-Fitzgerald, 1st Bt =

Sir Thomas Judkin-Fitzgerald, 1st Baronet (born 1754; died Cork, 24 September 1810) was an Anglo-Irish lawyer and sheriff. As High Sheriff of Tipperary, Judkin-Fitzgerald suppressed the Irish Rebellion of 1798 in his county with great severity.

== Early life ==
Judkin-Fitzgerald was born Thomas Fitzgerald; his father Robert had originally borne the last name "Uniacke" but adopted "Fitzgerald" in accordance to the will of his grandmother's brother. His mother was Frances Fitzgerald, née Judkin, and Thomas adopted the surname of Judkin as well in accordance to the will of his maternal uncle, John Judkin of Cashel. Judkin-Fitzgerald became a lawyer in Tipperary.

His eldest brother Col. Robert Uniacke Fitzgerald (1751-1814) was an MP both in the Parliament of Ireland and in the new Parliament of the United Kingdom.

== The Irish Rebellion of 1798 ==
A visitor to Judkin-Fitzgerald later in his life described him as "The most extraordinary man I ever saw. ... He is of an amazing size and the strongest man in the world. The most gentle and mild tempered but most violent on occasions..."

Judkin-Fitzgerald was asked to become the High Sheriff of Tipperary early in 1798. As a Loyalist Protestant who spoke both Irish and English, he was tasked with suppressing potential rebellion in the county amid rumors of a French invasion. This he did, although with such severity and sometimes on such flimsy accusations that several lawsuits were filed against him later. A teacher of French named Wright in the town of Clonmel was flogged and mistreated so badly that he later won a judgement of five hundred pounds against Judkin-Fitzgerald. Fitzgerald had in part accused Wright based on a brief letter in French found in his possession, which when translated proved innocuous. After hearings before a secret committee, Parliament passed a special indemnity act to protect Judkin-Fitzgerald, but not without considerable debate and criticism. Nevertheless, he was given a pension and on 5 August 1801 was awarded a baronetcy.

The bitterness of Irish Republicans towards Judkin-Fitzgerald can be seen in the obituary published in The Irish Magazine, October 1810, which said in part, "The history of his life and his loyalty is written in legible characters on the backs of his countrymen, his enormities were so various, and the fertility of his imagination in devising new modes of desolation and torture were so truly original that expresses and relays of horses were every day employed to give the earliest intelligence of their effect through the country, for the instruction of other gentlemen, who had the management of Whipping Districts."

== Family ==
Judkin-Fitzgerald married Elizabeth Capel and they had three sons. John Judkin-Fitzgerald (1787-1860) succeeded to the baronetcy; he also served as High Sheriff of Tipperary (in 1819) and as mayor of Cashel; he died in the wreck of the PS Nimrod. The younger sons were Joseph Capel Judkin-Fitzgerald (1789-1840) and Robert Uniacke Judkin-Fitzgerald (1792-1812), an officer in the 32nd Regiment, who died at the Battle of Salamanca.
