= Filo del Sol =

Copper mining project in the Andes mountains

Filo del Sol mine
- Interactive map of Filo del Sol mine
- Location: Atacama Desert, San Juan Province, Argentina, Argentina; 28°29′26″S 69°39′26″W
- Products: Copper, gold, silver
- Company: Lundin Mining; BHP

Filo del Sol (lit. "Edge of the Sun") is a copper and gold mining project in the high Andes along the Argentina-Chile border. The project was initially carried out by Filo Mining which is part of Lundin Mining, but after July 2024 BHP and Lundin Mining agreed to form together a new mining company to develop the projects of Filo del Sol and Josemaría.

The project lies in the Atacama Region of the Andes, within the Argentine province of San Juan Province, Argentina Mining operations are expected to last 13 years once the mine is opened. Geologically the project is developing on a high-sulfidation epithermal ore deposit associated with a wider copper-gold porphyry system. The material to be mined has an ore grade of 0.38% copper, 0.33g/t gold, and 0.33g/t silver. Probable ore reserves are 259.1 million tons.

The planned mine is to have a strip ratio of 1.57 to 1.

Filo del Sol and Josemaría have generated expectation in Atacama Region albeit mining unions in neighbouring areas of Argentina have expressed concern about the possible dependency of the projects on Chilean supplies and mine workers, and Chilean ports as export routes.
