= Scheelite =

Calcium tungstate mineral

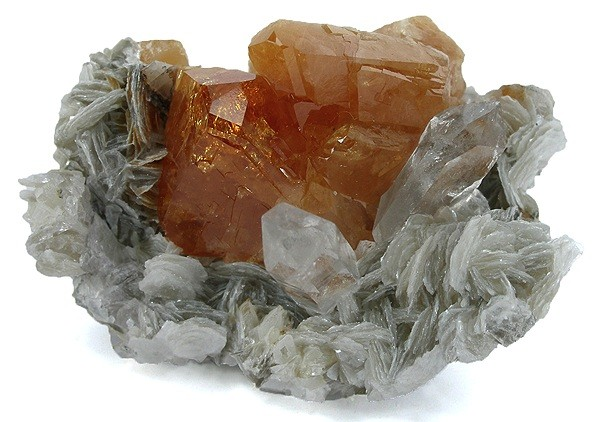

General
- Category: Tungstate mineral
- Formula: CaWO_{4}
- IMA symbol: Sch
- Strunz classification: 7.GA.05
- Crystal system: Tetragonal
- Crystal class: Dipyramidal (4/m); H-M symbol: (4/m)
- Space group: I4_{1}/a
- Unit cell: a = 5.2429(3), Å c = 11.3737(6) Å; Z = 4

Identification
- Color: Colorless, white, gray, dark brown, brown, tan, pale yellow, yellow-orange, golden yellow, pale shades of orange, red, green, etc.; colorless in transmitted light and may be compositionally color zoned
- Crystal habit: Pseudo-octahedra, massive, columnar, granular
- Twinning: Common, penetration and contact twins, composition plane {110} or {001}
- Cleavage: On {101}, distinct; on {112}, interrupted; on {001}, indistinct
- Fracture: Subconchoidal to uneven
- Tenacity: Brittle
- Mohs scale hardness: 4.5–5
- Luster: Vitreous to adamantine
- Streak: White
- Diaphaneity: Transparent to opaque
- Specific gravity: 5.9–6.1
- Optical properties: Uniaxial (+)
- Refractive index: n_{ω} = 1.918–1.921, n_{ε} = 1.935–1.938
- Birefringence: δ = 0.017
- Pleochroism: Definite dichroic in yellow (yellow to orange-brown)
- Fusibility: With difficulty
- Solubility: Soluble in alkalis. Insoluble in acids
- Other characteristics: Fluorescence under short-wave UV is bright blue, bluish white to yellow. Specimens with more molybdenum tend to fluoresce white to yellow, similar to powellite. Occasionally, it fluoresces red under mid-wave UV.

Scheelite is a calcium tungstate mineral with the chemical formula CaWO_{4}. It is an important ore of tungsten (wolfram). Scheelite is originally named after Swedish chemist Carl Wilhelm Scheele (1742–1786). Well-formed crystals are sought by collectors and are occasionally fashioned into gemstones when suitably free of flaws. Scheelite has been synthesized using the Czochralski process; the material produced may be used to imitate diamond, as a scintillator, or as a solid-state lasing medium. It was also used in radium paint in the same fashion as was zinc sulphide, and Thomas Edison invented a fluoroscope with a calcium tungstate-coated screen, making the images six times brighter than those with barium platinocyanide; the latter chemical allowed Röntgen to discover X-rays in early November 1895. The semi-precious stone marketed as 'blue scheelite' is actually a rock type consisting mostly of calcite and dolomite, with occasional traces of yellow-orange scheelite.

== Properties ==
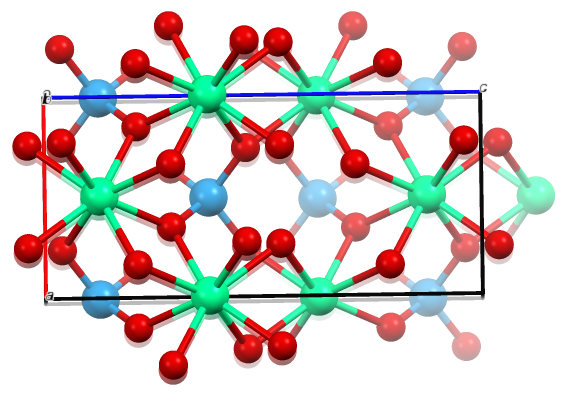
Structure of CaWO_{4} (Green is Ca, Red is O, blue is W)

Its crystals are in the tetragonal crystal system, appearing as dipyramidal pseudo-octahedra. Colors include golden yellow, brownish green to dark brown, pinkish to reddish gray, orange and colorless. Transparency ranges from translucent to transparent, and crystal faces are highly lustrous (vitreous to adamantine). Scheelite possesses distinct cleavage, and its fracture may be subconchoidal to uneven. Its specific gravity is high at 5.9–6.1 and its hardness is low at 4.5–5. Aside from pseudo-octahedra, scheelite may be columnar, granular, tabular or massive in habit. Druzes are pretty rare and occur almost exclusively at Cínovec, Czech Republic. Twinning is also commonly observed, and crystal faces may be striated. Scheelite has a white mineral streak and is brittle.

Gems cut from transparent material are fragile. Scheelite's refractive index (1.918–1.937 uniaxial positive, with a maximum birefringence of 0.016) and dispersion (0.026) are both moderately high. These factors combine to result in scheelite's high lustre and perceptible "fire", approaching that of diamond.

Scheelite fluoresces under shortwave ultraviolet light, the mineral glows a bright sky-blue. The presence of molybdenum trace impurities occasionally results in a green glow. Fluorescence of scheelite, sometimes associated with native gold, is used by geologists in the search for gold deposits.

== Occurrence ==
Scheelite occurs in contact metamorphic skarns; in high-temperature hydrothermal veins and greisen; less commonly in granite pegmatites. Temperature and pressure of formation is between 200 and 500 °C (400 and 900 °F) and from 200 to 1,500 bars (2,900 to 21,800 psi). Typical mineral association includes cassiterite, wolframite, topaz, fluorite, apatite, tourmaline, quartz, grossular–andradite, diopside, vesuvianite and tremolite.

Scheelite usually occurs in tin-bearing veins and is sometimes found in association with gold. Fine crystals have been obtained from Caldbeck Fells in Cumbria, Cínovec and Loket in the Czech Republic, Guttannen in Switzerland, the Giant Mountains in Silesia, Dragoon Mountains in Arizona and elsewhere. At Trumbull in Connecticut and Kimpu-san in Japan, large crystals of scheelite completely altered to wolframite have been found: those from Japan have been called “reinite.” It was mined until 1990 at King Island, Australia, Glenorchy in Central Otago and Macraes Flat in North Otago and also at The Golden Bar mine at Dead Horse Creek during World War I in Nelson, New Zealand. There is a high concentration of scheelite in the Northeast of Brazil, mainly in the Currais Novos mine in Rio Grande do Norte State. One of the world's largest scheelite mining companies is in Luoyang, China.

== History ==
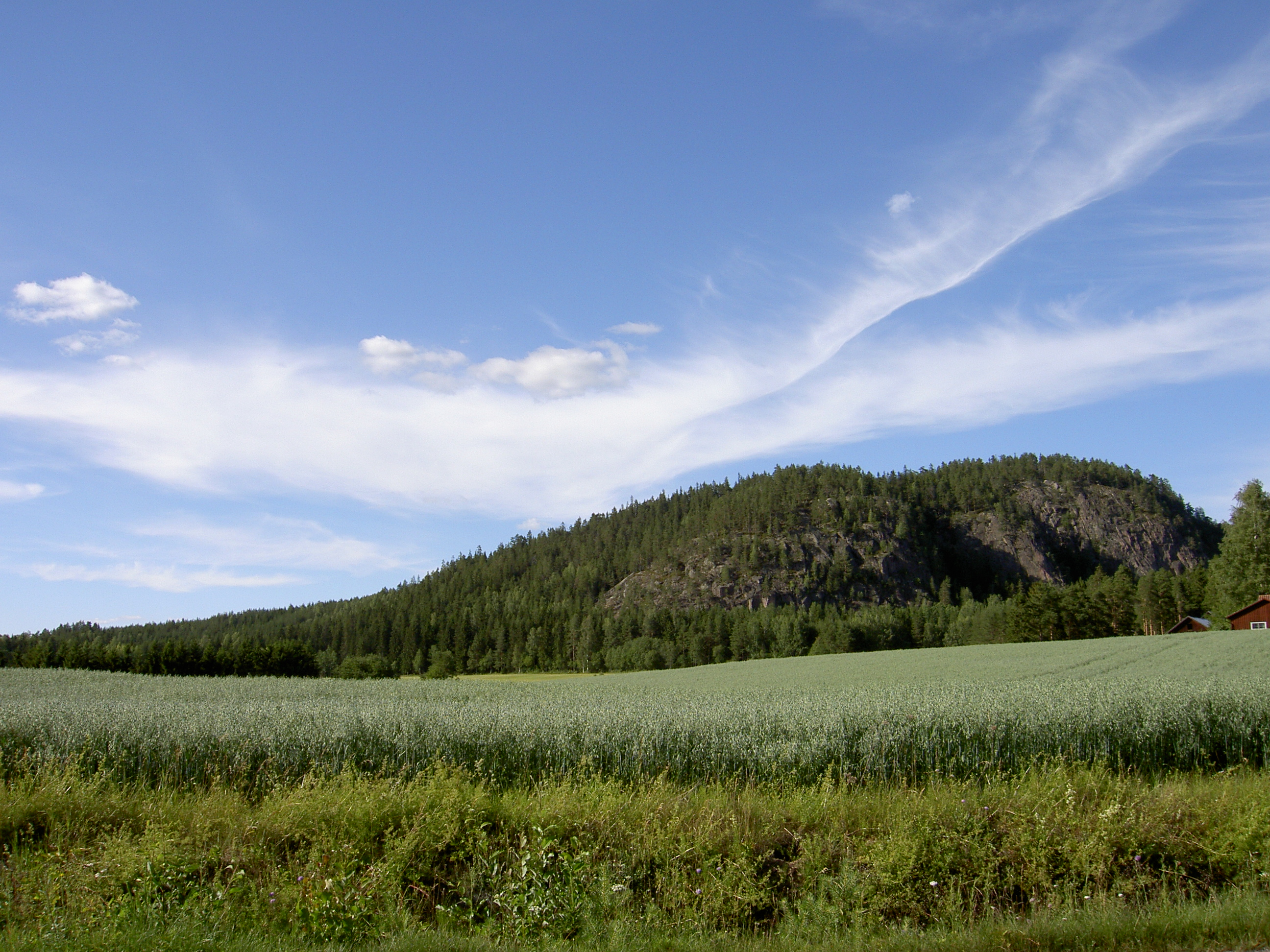
Mount Bispbergs klack

Scheelite was first described in 1751 for an occurrence in Mount Bispbergs klack, Säter, Dalarna, Sweden, and named for Carl Wilhelm Scheele (1742–1786). Owing to its unusual heaviness, it had been given the name tungsten by the Swedes, meaning “heavy stone.” The name was later used to describe the metal, while the ore itself was given the name scheelerz or scheelite.

== Synthetics ==
Scheelite as a diamond imitation has been surpassed by more convincing products, like cubic zirconia and moissanite. Synthetic scheelite is occasionally offered as natural scheelite, and collectors may thus be fooled into paying high prices for it. Gemologists distinguish natural scheelite from synthetic material mainly by microscopic examination: Natural material is very seldom without internal growth features and inclusions (imperfections), while synthetic material is usually spotless. Distinctly artificial curved striae and clouds of minute gas bubbles may also be observed in synthetic scheelite.

The visible absorption spectrum of scheelite, as seen by a hand-held (direct-vision) spectroscope, may also be of use: most natural stones show several faint absorption lines in the yellow region of the spectrum (~585 nm) due to praseodymium and neodymium trace impurities. Conversely, synthetic scheelite is often without such a spectrum.

== Applications ==
Scheelite is widely used in phosphors, particularly in scintillators for X-ray and gamma-ray detection. The second and third iterations of the Cryogenic Rare Event Search with Superconducting Thermometers dark matter detector experiment use calcium tungstate as a scintillator as well. It is also utilized in fluorescent lighting systems for its ability to convert ultraviolet light into visible light. In some cathode-ray tubes (CRTs), calcium tungstate (scheelite) is used as a phosphorescent screen material.

== In popular culture ==
Scheelite figures in the manga series Dr. Stone, as a precursor to tungsten, and for its fluorescence.
