= Galmoy Mine =

Mine in Ireland

- Location within Ireland
- Location: Galmoy, County Kilkenny, Ireland; 52.806325°N 7.594740°W
- Products: lead, zinc
- Type: carbonate-hosted lead-zinc ore deposits
- Greatest depth: 545 metres (1,788 ft)
- Discovered: 1987
- Opened: 1997
- Company: Lundin Mining
- Website: www.mining-technology.com/projects/galmoy/

Galmoy Mine is an abandoned zinc and lead mine 50 km (31 mi) northwest of Kilkenny, Ireland. Located in the Rathdowney Trend, Galmoy was an underground mine that operated from 1997 to 2012, initially by Arcon International Resources, then by Lundin Mining from 2005.

The Rathdowney Trend stretches 40 km (25 mi), between the towns of Abbeyleix and Thurles. The region is a broad plain drained by the Rossetown and Drish Rivers, tributaries of the River Suir, which flows into the sea at Waterford. Exploration of the Rathdowney Trend during the late 1960s and early 1970s identified sporadic occurrences of lead and zinc, although the first significant mineralisation was not discovered until 1984. Lisheen Mine is also in the Rathdowney Trend.

Galmoy was exclusively an underground operation. Initially the mine used room and pillar methods exclusively, but subsequent modifications introduced both benching and drift and fill systems where conditions were appropriate, as a means of maximising ore recoveries. At the same time, the mining method was designed to ensure that no waste rock needed to be hauled to the surface.

Concentrates were transported by truck to New Ross port, County Wexford, about 80 km (50 mi) away, and loaded onto ships for transport to smelters, located mainly in Europe.

A miner was killed in an accident in 2007.

In 2008 workers at Galmoy Mines were told the mine was to close completely on a phased basis by July 2011, due to dwindling zinc resources at Galmoy and a drop in the price for metal worldwide. Production from the mine ceased in May 2009. Some ore remained unmined and plans were being formulated to recover of some or all of this ore. The mine finally closed in 2012.

== Geology ==
The Galmoy ore bodies are breccia-hosted, generally stratabound lenses of mainly massive sulphides consisting of sphalerite, argentiferous galena and pyrite/marcasite in different combinations. Hosted in Lower Carboniferous rocks, they occur at the junction of an argillaceous bioclastic limestone beneath dolomitised Waulsortian limestone.

== See also ==
- Mining
- Tara Mine
- Lisheen Mine
