= Aura Minerals =

Mining company

Aura Minerals Inc.
- Formerly: Baldwin Consolidated Mines Limited (1946-89), Canadian Baldwin Holdings Limited (1989-2005), Aura Gold (2006-07)
- Type: Public
- Traded as: Nasdaq: AUGO; TSX: ORA; Russell 1000 component
- Industry: Mining
- Founded: 1946
- Headquarters: Road Town, British Virgin Islands
- Key people: Paulo Carlos de Brito (Chair); Rodrigo Barbosa (President and CEO)
- Products: Gold and copper
- Revenue: US$150 million (2017)
- Subsidiaries: Minerales de Occidente S.A. de C.V., San Andres (Honduras) Ltd., Apoena Minerals (B.V.I.) Inc., Aranzazú Holding S.A. de C.V.
- Website: www.auraminerals.com

Aura Minerals Inc. is a Canadian multi-national mining company that owns and operates gold and copper mines in Honduras, Brazil and Mexico. The company is headquartered in the British Virgin Islands, operated from its corporate office in Florida and has its stocks traded on the Toronto Stock Exchange and BDR on the B3.

== Operations ==
The company's producing assets include the San Andres gold mine in Honduras and the Ernesto/Pau-a-Pique gold mine in Brazil. On July 16, 2018, the company announced the results of the NI 43-101 Feasibility Study for the restart of operations at its Aranzazu mine in Zacatecas, Mexico. In addition, the company has two additional gold exploration projects in Brazil, Almas and Matupá, and one gold project in Colombia, Tolda Fria.

== Executives of Aura Minerals ==
The Corporate Executives

The Chief Executive Officer is currently the Brazilian mechanical engineer Rodrigo Barbosa, The Chief Operating Officer is currently the Brazilian mining engineer, The Chief Financial Officer is currently the Brazilian economist Kleber Cardoso.

The Operations Executives

The General Manager for Operations at the Aura Minerals subsidiary Minerales de Occidente S.A. de C.V. or Aura Minosa in Honduras, is the Brazilian engineer Wilton Muricy that has been working on the company since 2021.

The Head for Operations at the Aura Minerals subsidiary Almas, is the Brazilian mining engineer Andréia Nunes that has been working on the company since 2022.

The General Manager for Operations at the Aura Minerals subsidiary Apoena is the Brazilian production engineer that has been working on mining for over 17 years.

The General Manager for Operations at the Aura Minerals subsidiary Aranzazu is the Brazilian metallurgical engineer, that has been working for the company since 2018.

== History ==
Formerly Canadian Baldwin Holdings Limited, the company changed its name to Aura Gold, with former-Yamana Gold CEO Victor Bradley as its new CEO, and listed shares on the Toronto Stock Exchange in 2006 in order to pursue exploration of gold properties in Brazil. In 2016, the company re-located its corporate offices from Toronto to Miami, Florida and, re-incorporated under the BVI Business Companies Act with its headquarters in Road Town, British Virgin Islands.

Mineraçāo Apoena, a subsidiary of Aura, closed the Sāo Vicente gold mine, located in Nova Lacerda, in July 2013. The closure is due to the natural depletion of the mine. The mine started commercial production in 2009 and in the first year of operations produced 49,584 ounces of gold from 2.16 million tons of ore with a 0.43 grams of gold per tonne content.

Aura Minerals reported it 206,747 ounces of gold were produced in 2013, an increase of 20% from the 172,500 in 2012.

The Aranzazu mine, which produces copper in Mexico, had its activities suspended in January 2015. The company said it would spend the first half reviewing the development plans, costs and expenses of the project

In May 2015, Aura Minerals signed an agreement with Serra da Borda Mineraçāo e Metalurgia (SBMM), a subsidiary of Yamana Gold, to acquire the Ernesto / Pau-a-Pique gold mine, located near Pontes e Lacerda, through the issuance of shares, call options and payment of royalties on future production. The operation was approved by the Administrative Council for Economic Defense (CADE) in July 2015.

In March 2018 the company completed a merger with TSX-listed Rio Novo Gold Inc in an all-stock deal with former Rio Novo shareholders forming 22% of the new Aura Minerals.
