= Tierra Amarilla, Chile =

Tierra Amarilla
- City and Commune
- Coat of arms Location in Chile
- Coordinates (city): 27°28′56″S 70°15′57″W
- Country: Chile
- Region: Atacama
- Province: Copiapó Province

Government
  - Type: Municipality

Area
  - Total: 11,190.6 km^{2} (4,320.7 sq mi)
- Elevation: 497 m (1,631 ft)

Population (2012 Census)
  - Total: 12,898
  - Density: 1.1526/km^{2} (2.9852/sq mi)
  - Urban: 8,578
  - Rural: 4,310

Sex
  - Men: 7,277
  - Women: 5,611
- Time zone: UTC−4 (CLT)
  - Summer (DST): UTC−3 (CLST)
- Area code: 56 + 52

Tierra Amarilla is a Chilean commune and city in Copiapó Province, Atacama Region. According to the 2012 census, the commune population was 12,898 and has an area of 11,191 km^{2}.

== Demographics ==
According to the 2002 census of the National Statistics Institute, Tierra Amarilla had 12,888 inhabitants (7,277 men and 5,611 women). Of these, 8,578 (66.6%) lived in urban areas and 4,310 (33.4%) in rural areas. The population grew by 9.9% (1,164 persons) between the 1992 and 2002 censuses.

== Administration ==
As a commune, Tierra Amarilla is a third-level administrative division of Chile administered by a municipal council, headed by an alcalde who is directly elected every four years.

Within the electoral divisions of Chile, Tierra Amarilla is represented in the Chamber of Deputies by Alberto Robles (PRSD) and Giovanni Calderón (UDI) as part of the 6th electoral district, (together with Caldera, Vallenar, Freirina, Huasco and Alto del Carmen). The commune is represented in the Senate by Isabel Allende Bussi (PS) and Baldo Prokurica Prokurica (RN) as part of the 3rd senatorial constituency (Atacama Region).

== History ==
A 25 m (80 ft) wide and more than 200 m (700 ft) deep sinkhole appeared in the commune of Tierra Amarilla, close to the Alcaparrosa copper mine on August 1, 2022. The sinkhole continued to grow and stretched 50 m (200 ft) in diameter on August 8.
