= Eagle Mine (Michigan) =

Mining project in the United States

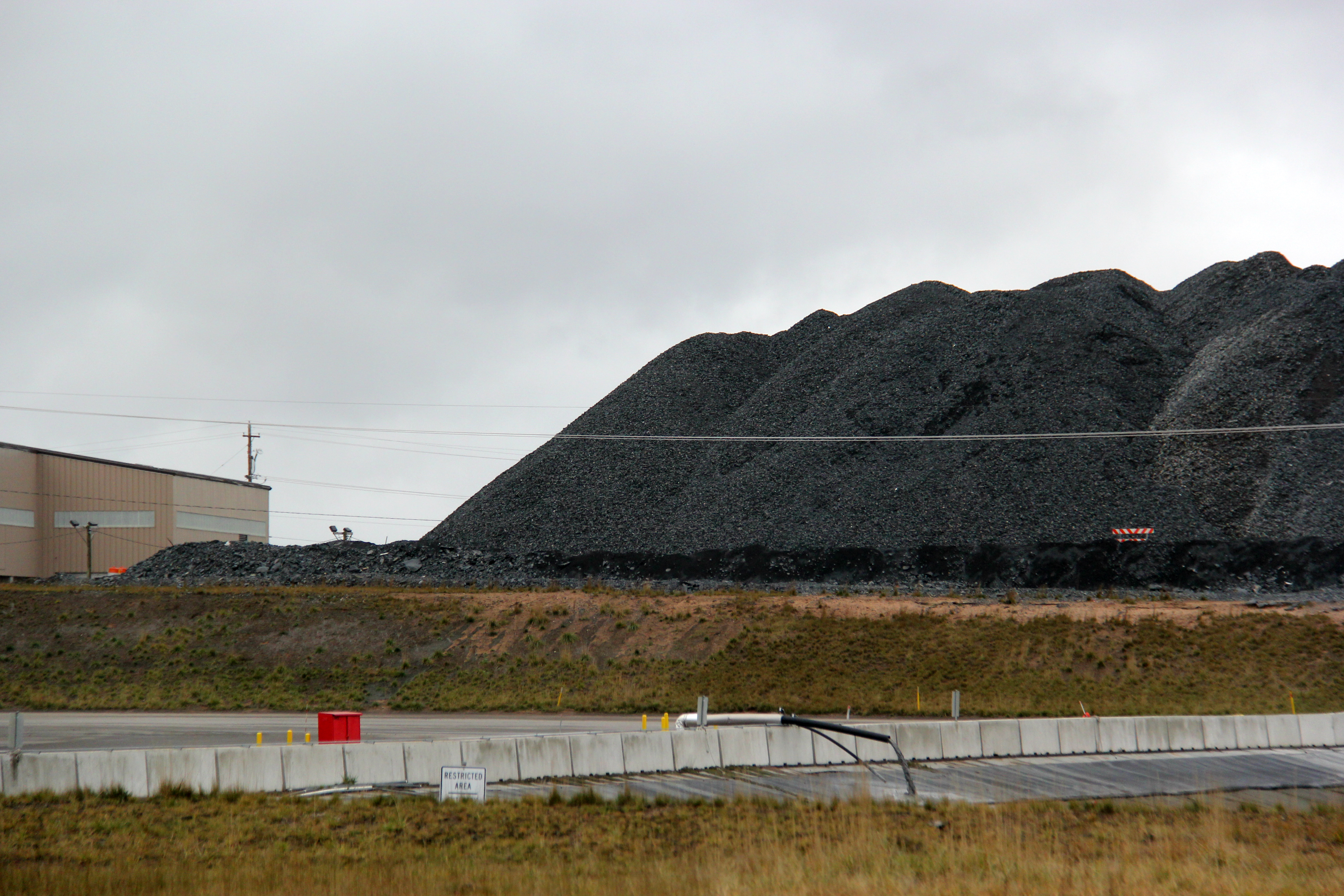
- Eagle Mine in 2015

- Location of mine in Michigan
- Location: Michigamme Township, Marquette County, Michigan, United States; 46°44′47″N 87°52′50″W
- Products: Copper, nickel
- Company: Talon Metals
- Website: https://www.eaglemine.com/

The Eagle Mine is a small, high-grade nickel mining and copper mining project owned by Talon Metals. The mine is located on the Yellow Dog Plains in the Upper Peninsula of Michigan in the United States. Eagle is the only primary nickel mine in the United States. The mine began production in fall 2014 and is expected to produce 440 million pounds of nickel, 429 million pounds of copper and small amounts of other metals (platinum, palladium, silver, gold, and cobalt) over its estimated mine life (2014-H2 2030).

The mine has a steady decline plunging to 1,774 feet below sea level. The mine is the deepest point in the United States where a car can be driven, down a ramp used by specialist mining vehicles. In 2022, Eagle Mine was used to set a Guinness World Record for the greatest altitude change achieved by an electric vehicle.

== Overview ==
Eagle is a decline-accessed underground mine, primarily utilizing long hole stoping for production. Surface construction at the mine started in 2010, with underground construction taking place in 2011. Production commenced in September 2014 ahead of schedule and on budget. The surface facilities for the mine cover 150 acres (61 ha), and ore processing is done off site at the nearby Humboldt Mill, a former iron-ore milling site. The mine will be backfilled as mining progresses. Once mining ceases, both facilities will be reclaimed to their natural state.

The Eagle deposit was formed during the Midcontinent Rift tectonic event approximately 1.1 billion years ago. The bottom of the ore body is about 1,000 feet deep and covers roughly 6 acres. The Eagle deposit is mostly nickel and copper, with trace amounts of cobalt, platinum, palladium, silver, and gold.

== Permitting ==
On July 30, 2007, the Michigan Department of Environmental Quality (DEQ) re-issued preliminary approval for the mining permit. The permit was initially approved in January 2007, however it was found that the DEQ failed to release documents relating to the crown pillar of the mine. As a result, the preliminary approval was withdrawn and the permit process was put on hold until the issue could be further investigated. The resulting investigation cleared the DEQ of any wrongdoing and the consideration of the permit application was able to proceed.

On December 14, 2007, the DEQ announced that it would issue permits for mining to take place at the Eagle project. DEQ Director Steven Chester said: "In the end, Kennecott's proposal met the high standard set by Michigan's environmental laws."

The Department of Natural Resources (DNR) issued a Surface Use Lease to Kennecott on February 7, granting use of a parcel of state land for surface facilities to be associated with the mine. The same four petitioners also filed suit in Ingham Circuit Court challenging the DNR decision to grant the lease. Kennecott also submitted an application for an Underground Injection Control permit from the U.S. Environmental Protection Agency (EPA) for its proposed disposal system for treated wastewater. The EPA has not indicated a timeframe for acting on the application.

Interest in the project both locally and statewide had increased due to the submission of a mining permit application for the project. However, the project garnered local opposition as well as support. The opposition groups claimed that the mine would produce environmental damage, while supporters and the company claimed the mine will protect the environment while producing much-needed jobs.

Some Native Americans believe that the mine site is sacred. In 2010, environmental activists and members of Native American tribes protested the development of the site. The Keweenaw Bay Indian Community sued to prevent construction of Eagle Mine over concerns about the potential for groundwater contamination. In 2014, a three-judge panel on the Michigan Court of Appeals ruled that state regulators were within their rights to permit the construction of a nickel and copper mine.

On January 9, 2026, Talon Metals Corp. acquired Eagle Mine and Humboldt Mill from Lundin Mining.

== See also ==
- Copper mining in Michigan
- Hard rock mining
