= Jacobina mine =

Gold mine in Bahia, Brazil

- Interactive map of Jacobina mine
- Location: Bahia state, Brazil
- Products: Gold
- Company: Yamana Gold

The Jacobina mine is one of the largest gold mines in the Brazil, and in the world.

The mine is located in Bahia state, in the eastern region of Brazil .

The mine has estimated reserves of 4.5 million oz of gold. It is owned by Yamana Gold.

== See also ==
- Brazilian Gold
- List of mines in Brazil
