= Azul mine =

Manganese mine in Brazil

- Location: Pará, Brazil
- Products: Manganese
- Opened: 1903

The Azul mine is a mine in the north of Brazil in Pará. Azul represents one of the largest manganese reserves in Brazil, having estimated reserves of 64.2 million tonnes of manganese ore grading 28% manganese metal.
