= N74 road (Ireland) =

Road in Ireland

N74 road
- Bóthar N74
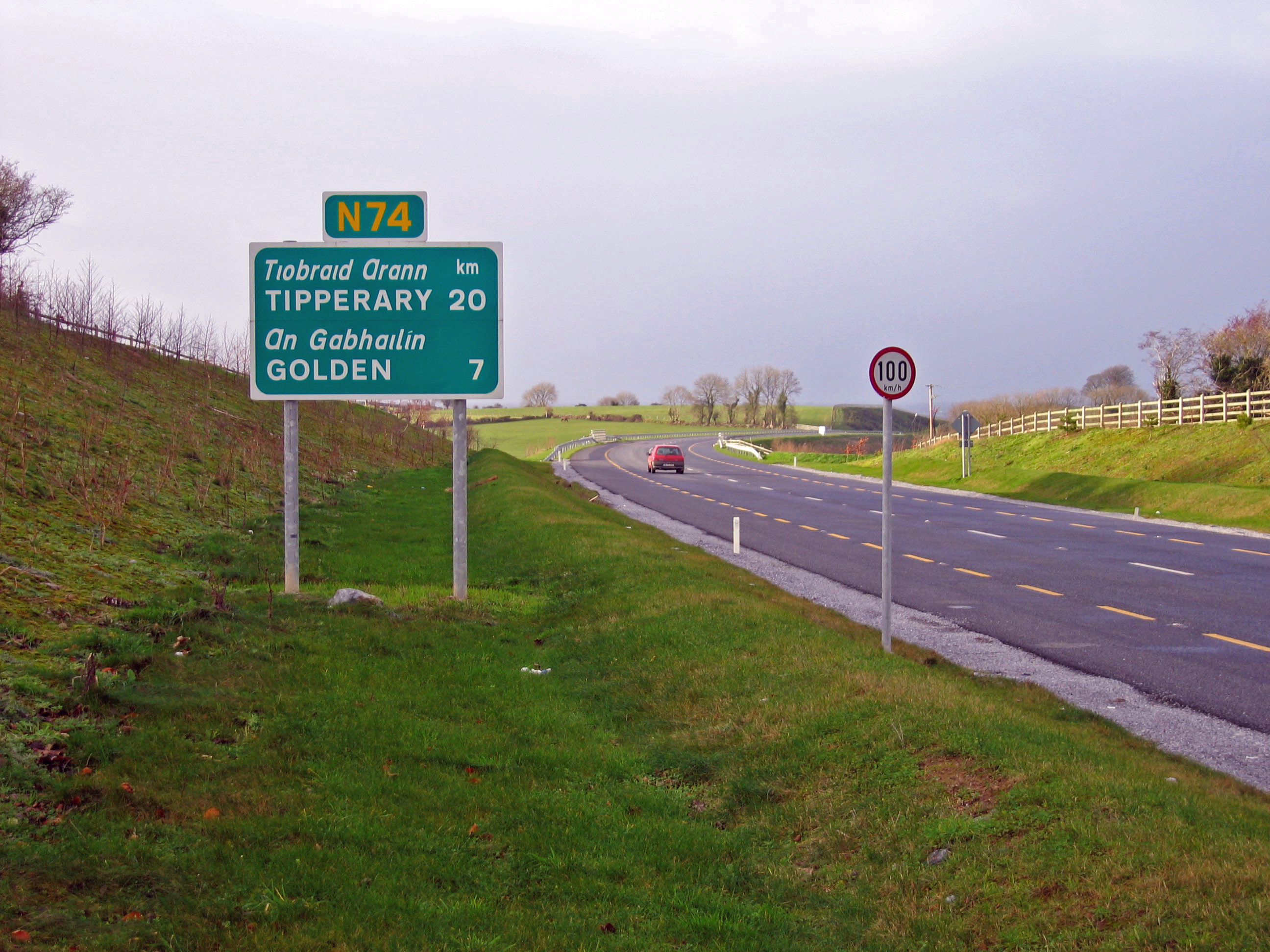
- N74 Cashel Bypass

Route information
- Length: 19.915 km (12.375 mi)

Location
- Country: Ireland
- Primary destinations: County Tipperary; Cashel; Golden; Thomastown; Kilfeakle; Tipperary

Highway system
- Roads in Ireland; Motorways; Primary; Secondary; Regional

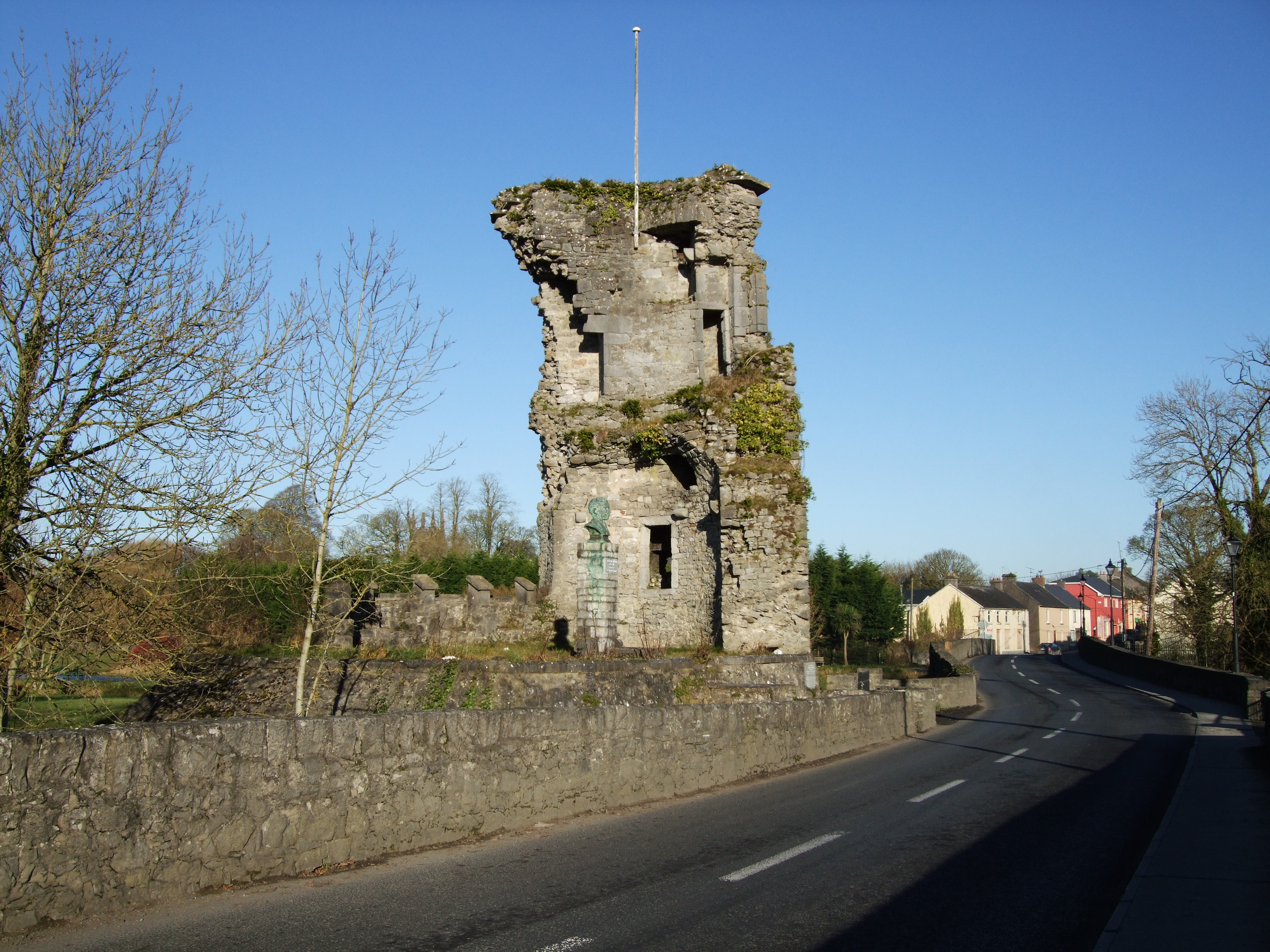
The N74 bridge over the River Suir at Golden

The N74 road is a national secondary road in Ireland. It runs for its entire length in County Tipperary, east to west from Cashel to Tipperary town, passing through the villages of Golden, Thomastown and Kilfeakle.

The N74 is 19.915 km (12.375 mi) in length. It also connects the N24 which passes through Tipperary Town with the M8 at Cashel.

== See also ==
- Roads in Ireland
- Motorways in Ireland
- National primary road
- Regional road
