= Wildlife Act 1976 =

Oireachtas
- Citation: Wildlife Act (No. 39 of 1976). Act of the Oireachtas. Retrieved from Irish Statute Book.
- Territorial extent: Ireland
- Enacted: 1976; 49 years ago

Amended by
- European Communities (Wildlife Act 1976) (Amendment) Regulations 1985; European Communities (Wildlife Act 1976) (Amendment) Regulations 1986; Wildlife (Amendment) Act 2000 (Act No. 38 of 2000)

Related legislation
- Wildlife Advisory Council Order; Wildlife Act 1976 (Protection of Wild Animals) Regulations; Wildlife Act 1976 (Acquisition of Land) Regulations

Summary
- Protection of certain wildlife and flora
- Status: Amended

The Wildlife Act 1976 is an Act of the Oireachtas protecting certain wildlife (including game) and flora in Ireland. With the Wildlife (Amendment) Act 2000, it is the principal national legislation for the protection of wildlife species and habitats in Ireland.

== Provisions ==
The Act included a schedule of protected species, but it was relatively weak on habitat protection, particularly in the case of habitats on privately owned land. Subsequent measures to transpose the European Union's Birds Directive (originally 1979, replaced 2009) and Habitats Directive (1992) into Irish law have strengthened habitat protection.

== Implementation ==
The Wildlife Act of 1976 was followed by:

- the "Wildlife Advisory Council Order" on 13 March 1978. Under the terms of the 1976 act, a Wildlife Advisory Council was established – known officially in the Irish language as "An Chomhairle Fhiadhulra". The functions of this body, which was abolished in 1987, included the establishment and maintenance of reserves and refuges for wildlife, the ongoing protection of breeding grounds, herd management, migration, etc. It would also make certain provisions relating to land, inland waters and the territorial waters of the state.
- the "Wildlife Act 1976 (Protection of Wild Animals) Regulations" on 10 September 1980,
- the "Wildlife Act 1976 (Acquisition of Land) Regulations" on 6 February 1978, and others.

== Amendments ==
Since 1976 the Act has since been amended several times, first by the "European Communities (Wildlife Act, 1976) (Amendment) Regulations, 1985", which sought to manage, conserve, and protect birds. The second amendment was the "European Communities (Wildlife Act, 1976) (Amendment) Regulations, 1986", which added the control of species of wild bird which may cause damage or injury to specified interests. The most recent was the "Wildlife (Amendment) Act, 2000 (Act No. 38 of 2000)", which provided statutory protection for Natural Heritage Areas as well as legislation relating to the management and conservation of forests, including the hunting and capture of birds in protected forests.

== See also ==
- Legislation affecting natural resource management in Ireland
