= Lanes Group =

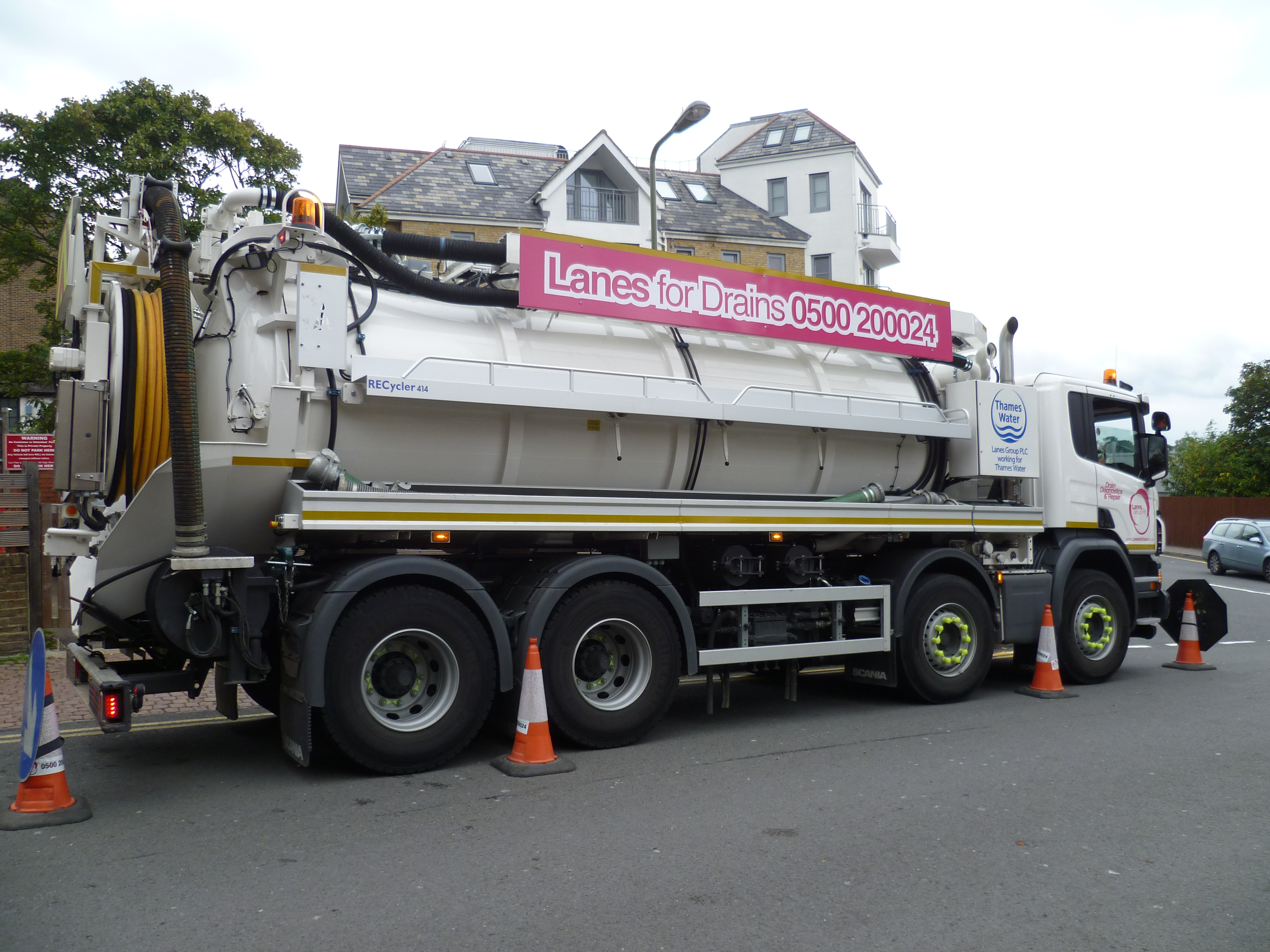
A Lanes Group vehicle working on behalf of Thames Water in north London with whom Lanes Group was awarded a £216 million contract in 2013.

Lanes Group Ltd are a British civil engineering group specialising in drainage and sewerage repair and railway works.

== Activities ==
The principal activities of the group are drainage and sewerage repair as Lanes for Drains, trenchless repair of sewers and drains as Lanes Reline and civil engineering for railways, trams and the London Underground as Lanes Group Rail Division. The firm has completed work for the Crossrail project.

== History ==
Lanes Group was formed in Leeds in 1992 as a drain cleaning and repair specialist at which time they employed just five people.

In 2010, Lanes Assistance Services, a claims management company owned by the group, was the subject of a £12 million management buyout backed by private equity firm Gresham.

In 2013, the firm won a £750 million contract to provide emergency blockage clearance and remedial drainage work to Thames Water in north London and the Thames Valley.

In April 2014, it was announced that Lanes had become the first British company to carry out a no-dig lateral junction (known as a top hat) repair on a wastewater network sewer.

In 2014, it was announced that Lanes were one of the contractors that would help refit 70 London Underground stations over seven years in a £330 million programme.

To date the company exists as the largest UK Waste Water Utility Solutions provider with c. £60 million in capital asset

In 2017 Lanes Utilities discovered the largest ever fatberg in history, located in Whitechapel, East London, it is thought to be 250 metres long, weighing 130 tonnes, which took specialist sewer working 3 weeks to clear. Coverage on the story gained worldwide interest. The story has reached over a billion people from more than 115 countries. The Fatberg was discover as part of routine maintenance carried out for water company giant, Thames Water, in which the company operates and maintains 109,000 km of underground network asset across a land mass of 5,000 square miles.
