= Chapada mine =

Gold mine in Brazil

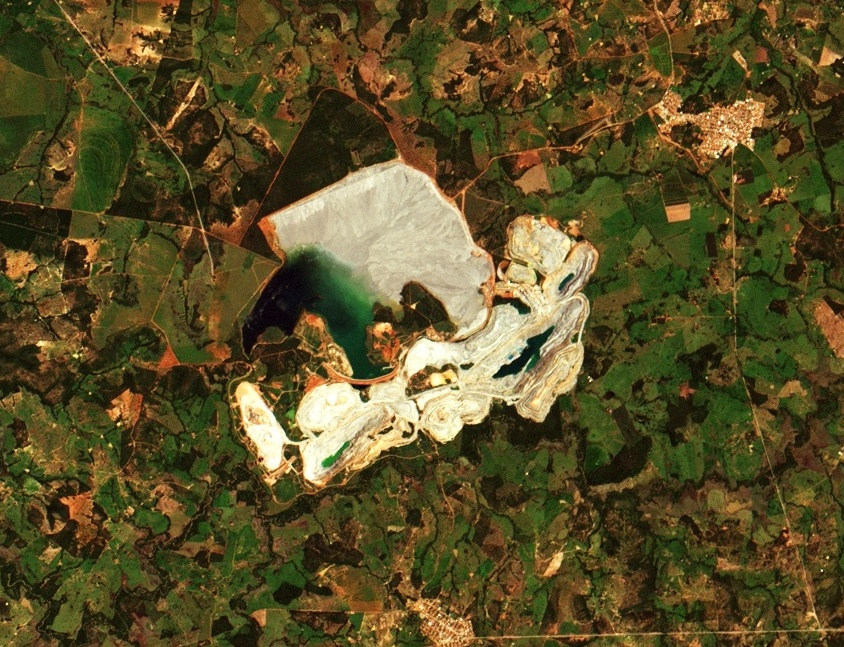
- Satellite image of Chapada mine. The cities of Alto Horizonte (upper right) and Nova Iguaçu de Goiás (bottom) can be seen.

Location
- Location: Goiás, Brazil

Production
- Products: Gold

Owner
- Company: Lundin Mining
- Acquired: Apr 2019

The Chapada mine is one of the larger gold mines in Brazil, and in the world.

The mine is located in Goiás state, in the central part of Brazil.

The mine has estimated reserves of 6 million oz of gold and 3.8 million oz of silver. In a transaction between two Canadian mining companies, Yamana Gold announced the sale of the Chapada mine to Lundin Mining on the 15th of April 2019.
