= Carbonate-hosted lead-zinc ore deposits =

Type of ore deposits

World-wide distribution of MVT deposits (red), clastic sediment-hosted (green), and unclassified (blue) lead-zinc deposits. Source: USGS

Carbonate-hosted lead-zinc ore deposits are important and highly valuable concentrations of lead and zinc sulfide ores hosted within carbonate (limestone, marl, dolomite) formations and which share a common genetic origin.

These ore bodies range from 0.5 million tonnes of contained ore, to 20 million tonnes or more, and have a grade of between 4% combined lead and zinc to over 14% combined lead and zinc. These ore bodies tend to be compact, fairly uniform plug-like or pipe-like replacements of their host carbonate sequences and as such can be extremely profitable mines.

This classification of ore deposits is also known as Mississippi Valley Type or MVT ore deposits, after a number of such deposits along the Mississippi River in the United States, where such ores were first recognised; these include the famed Southeast Missouri Lead District of southeastern Missouri, and deposits in northeast Iowa, southwest Wisconsin, and northwest Illinois.

Similarly Irish-type carbonate lead-zinc ores, exemplified by Lisheen Mine in County Tipperary, are formed in similar ways.

== Sources ==
The ultimate source of the mineralizing fluid(s) in MVT deposits is unknown. The ore fluids of MVT deposits are typically low temperature (100 °C–150 °C) and have the composition of basinal brines (10–30 wt.% NaCl equivalent) with pH's of 4.5–5 (buffered by host carbonates). This hydrothermal fluid may or may not carry the required sulfur to form sulfide minerals. Mobile hydrocarbons may have played a role in delivering reduced sulfur to certain MVT systems, while methane and other organic matter can potentially reduce sulfate carried by an acidic fluid. The ore fluid is suspected to be derived from clastic red bed sequences (potential metal source) that contain evaporites (potential sulfur source).

== Transport ==
Two potential transportation mechanisms for the metal-bearing ore fluid have been proposed. The first involves compaction of sediments in basins with rapid sedimentation. Mineralizing fluids within the basin become trapped within discrete, over-pressured aquifers and escape episodically and rapidly. The second fluid transportation mechanism is topographically-driven gravitational fluid flow. This occurs during uplift that is commonly associated with an orogenic event. One edge of a basin is uplifted during the formation of a foreland fold and thrust belt, and basinal fluids migrate laterally away from the deformation front as the basin is uplifted. Migration of the fluids through deep portions of the basin may result in the acquisition of metals and sulfur contained within the basin.

== Trap ==
The trap for carbonate-hosted lead-zinc sulfides is a chemical reaction which occurs as a consequence of concentration of sulfur, often hydrocarbons, and zinc and lead which are absorbed by the hydrocarbons. The hydrocarbons can either leak out of the fault zone or fold hinge, leaving a stockwork of weakly mineralized carbonate-sulfide veins, or can degrade via pyrolysis in place to form bitumens.

Once hydrocarbons are converted to bitumen, their ability to chelate metal ions and sulfur is reduced and results in these elements being expelled into the fluid, which becomes saturated in zinc, lead, iron and sulfur. Sulfide minerals such as galena, sphalerite, marcasite and pyrite thus form.

Commonly MVT deposits form by the combination of hydrocarbon pyrolysis liberating zinc-lead ions and sulfur to form an acidic solution which dissolves the host carbonate formation and replaces it with massive sulfide accumulations. This may also take the morphology of fault-hosted stockworks, massive tabular replacements and so forth.

Porous limestones may form disseminated ores, however most MVT deposits are massive sulfides with knife-like margins between carbonate and sulfide mineralogies.

== Mineralogy and alteration ==
Ore minerals in carbonate replacement deposits are typically lead sulfide, galena, and zinc sulfide sphalerite. Weathered equivalents form anglesite, cerussite, smithsonite, hydrozincite and secondary galena and sphalerite within the supergene zone.

MVT and Irish type deposits are commonly associated with a 'dolomite front' alteration, which manifests as a yellow-cream wash of dolomite (calcium-magnesium carbonate) within calcite-aragonite assemblages of unaltered carbonate formations.

Most ore bodies are quite sulfidic, and most are very low-iron, with pyrite-marcasite contents typically below 30% of the mass of sulfides. This makes MVT lead-zinc deposits particularly easy to treat from a metallurgical view. Some MVT deposits can, however, be very iron-rich and some sulfide replacement and alteration zones are associated with no lead-zinc at all, resulting in massive accumulations of pyrite-marcasite, which are essentially worthless.

There is sometimes an association with quartz veining and colloform silica, however silicate gangue minerals are often rare.

== Oil synergies ==
The importance and synergies between hydrocarbon source-transport-trap 'fairways' and MVT and Irish Type lead-zinc deposits has been known for several decades. Often the prospectivity of particular carbonate formations for lead-zinc deposits of this nature is first identified by core drilling by oil explorers.

This concept of a cogeneration of hydrocarbons and precursor brines by the same process allows many lead-zinc explorers to use hydrocarbon basin models to predict if a carbonate sequence is likely to host MVT or Irish Type mineralization.

== Exploration ==
Exploration for MVT deposits is relatively complex in theory and straightforward in practise. During the area selection phase, attention must be paid to the nature of the carbonate sequences, especially if there is a 'dolomite front' alteration identified within oil exploration wells, which is commonly associated with lead-zinc mineralisation.

Thereafter, attention must be paid to picking floral facies of any reef carbonates formed from coral reef accumulations. The facies of the carbonate sequence is critical, as this is controlled mostly by faults which are the ultimate target of exploration. A fore-reef/back-reef transition is the 'sweet spot', and thus depending on the age of the carbonate sequence, familiarity with coral palaeontology is considered essential.

Finally, once a basin model of the carbonate sequence is formulated, and the primary basin-margin faults are roughly identified, a gravity survey is often carried out, which is the only geophysical technique which can directly detect MVT deposits. Gravity surveys aim to detect significant accumulations of lead and zinc due to their greater density relative to their surrounding host rocks.

Finally, the 'pointy end' of an exploration programme is to drill each and every one of the gravity targets in sequence, with no favour or prejudice given to the strength or amplitude of any anomaly. It is well known that unsubtle and unsophisticated methods of pattern drilling have found MVT deposits missed by more selective explorers, for instance the Lennard Shelf Deposits in Western Australia were found on the second last hole of an extensive drilling programme.

== Similar deposit styles ==
Similar deposit styles may be encountered in sheared and deformed carbonate belts where zinc-lead sulfides are hosted at the sheared contact of carbonates with siliciclastic sequences. Examples include the Dharwar Basin zinc-lead deposits, India where sulfides are hosted in shears within dolomite sequences.

== Examples ==
- Admiral Bay, Zn-Pb-Ag deposit, Northwest Shelf, Western Australia, theorised to be an MVT replacement type (undeveloped)
- Pine Point Mine, Zn-Pb, deposit, Northwest Territories, Canada. (producer, 1964–1988)
- Manbarrum-Sorby Hills zinc and lead deposits, Bonaparte Basin, Western Australia and Northern Territory (undeveloped)
- Lennard Shelf Lead-Zinc deposits, Lennard Shelf, Kimberleys, Western Australia.
- Tara Mine, Ireland
- Topla and Mežica mines on Petzen, Austrian-Slovenian border.

== See also ==
- Lead, zinc
- Limestone
- Coral reef
- Ore genesis
- Fault (geology)
- Metasomatism
