= Copiapó Valley =

27°27′S 70°00′W

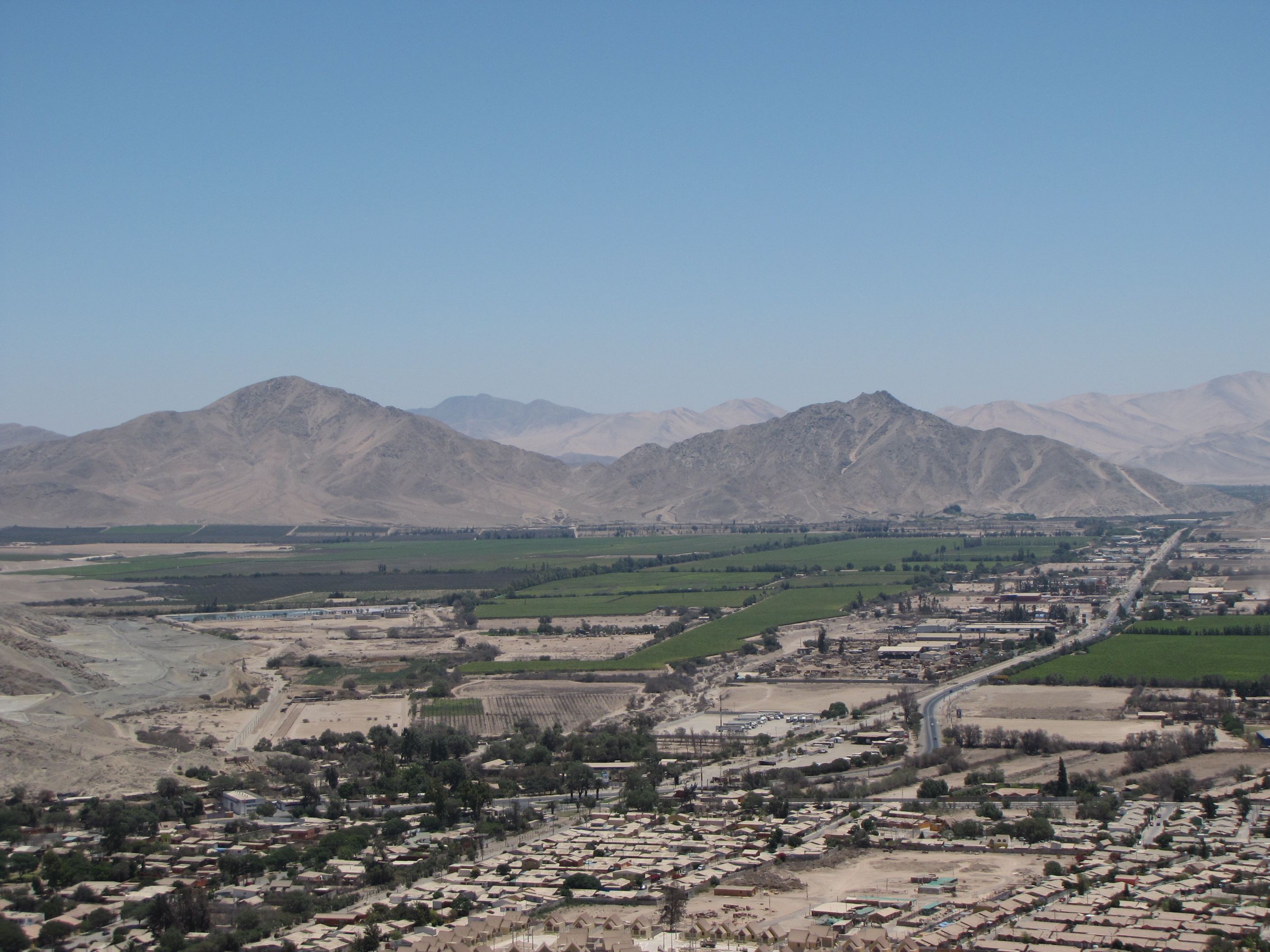
View of vineyards in Copiapó Valley next to the city of Copiapó.

Copiapó Valley is a wine-producing region of Chile. It extends through the entirety of the Copiapó Province and has been considered in the law since 1994.
