= Epithermal vein deposit =

Mineral deposit that forms in the shallow subsurface

The epithermal vein deposit (EVP) is a type of mineral deposit that forms in the shallow subsurface, typically at depths of less than 1,500 meters below the Earth's surface. These deposits are formed by hot, mineral-rich fluids that circulate through fractures and cracks in rocks. As the fluids cool, they deposit minerals, such as gold, silver, copper, lead, and zinc, into the veins. EVP are typically small in size, but they can be very high-grade, meaning that they contain a high concentration of valuable minerals.

This makes them attractive targets for mining, despite the challenges of their small size and depth.

== Types of deposits ==
=== High sulfidation deposit ===
High-sulfide epithermal (HSE) deposits, or also known, high sulfidation deposit, are notable for their high concentrations of sulfide minerals such as pyrite, galena, and sphalerite.

=== Low sulfidation deposit ===
Low-sulfide epithermal (LSE) deposits, or also known as low sulfidation deposit, represent a distinct category of mineral deposits formed within the shallow subsurface, generally at depths less than 1,500 meters beneath the Earth's surface.

Examples of notable LSE deposits include the Carlin Trend in Nevada, USA, renowned for being one of the largest gold deposits globally, the Cripple Creek district in Colorado, USA, historically recognized for its gold and silver production, and the Guanajuato district in Mexico, a significant producer of silver since the 16th century. Despite their potential, exploring and developing LSE deposits pose challenges due to complex geology and remote locations, much like HSE deposits. However, their allure lies in the high concentration of valuable metals, especially gold and silver, making them attractive targets for mining companies.

Several additional considerations underscore the nature of LSE deposits. The boiling of hydrothermal fluids, triggered by a decrease in pressure as they ascend closer to the surface, is a key factor in their formation, crucial in concentrating gold and silver.

== Examples of mining areas ==
Here are some examples of mining areas with epithermal vein deposits:

- The Comstock Lode, Nevada, USA: This historic mining district was one of the most productive in the world, having produced over $400 million in gold and silver during its peak in the 19th century. The epithermal veins at Comstock are hosted in volcanic rocks and are known for their rich pockets of gold and silver.
- The Waihi District, New Zealand: This region is home to several epithermal vein deposits, including the Martha Mine, one of the largest gold mines in New Zealand.
- The Guanajuato Mining District, Mexico: This district has been mined for centuries and is known for its high-grade epithermal veins containing gold and silver.
- The Baguio Mineral District, Philippines: This district is home to numerous epithermal vein deposits, including the Acupan Mine, one of the largest gold mines in the Philippines.
