= Judkin-Fitzgerald baronets =

Extinct baronetcy in the Baronetage of the United Kingdom

The Baronetcy of Lisheen, County Tipperary, was created in the Baronetage of the United Kingdom on 5 August 1801 for Col. Thomas Judkin-Fitzgerald (Uniacke), who had adopted the surname of Judkin in compliance with the will of his maternal uncle Judge John Lapp Judkin, of Cashel. The title was a reward for suppressing the United Irish Rebellion of 1798 in Co Tipperary as High Sheriff of Tipperary.

On his death in 1810, in a "criminatory obituary" and in reference to his excessive use of the cat o' nine tails at this time, it was said that "The history of his life and loyalty is written in legible characters on the backs of his fellow countrymen."

He was succeeded by his son John, the second Baronet. John was Mayor of Cashel, and High Sheriff of Tipperary in 1819; the third Baronet Thomas was also a magistrate, and a Deputy Lieutenant for the County Tipperary. With the death of the fourth Baronet in 1917, the baronetcy became apparently extinct or dormant.

== Judkin-Fitzgerald baronets, of Lisheen (1801) ==
- Sir Thomas Judkin-Fitzgerald, 1st Baronet (1754–1810), High Sheriff of Tipperary 1798
- Sir John Judkin-Fitzgerald, 2nd Baronet (1787–1860) High Sheriff of Tipperary 1819, Mayor of Cashel, died aboard the PS Nimrod.
- Sir Thomas Judkin-Fitzgerald, 3rd Baronet (1820–1864), magistrate and Deputy Lieutenant for the County Tipperary. His residence "Golden Hills" was named after the townland in which it was located Golden Hills, near the village of Golden, in the barony of Clanwilliam. Dr. Matthew S. Kennedy. Death from temporary insanity. Reported by Thomas Mack. Source: A return of inquisitions held by the coroner for the South Riding of the County of Tipperary commencing 1st Feb 1864 and ending June 1864.
- Sir Joseph Capel Judkin-Fitzgerald, 4th Baronet (1853–1917)

== Heraldic insignia ==
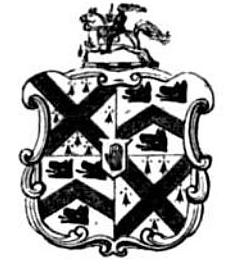
Sir John Judkin-Fitzgerald, 2nd Bt

Coat of arms

- Shield: The heraldic badges of Sir John Judkin-Fitzgerald 2nd Bt & grandson Sir Joseph Capel 4th Bt were derived from the
- Arms: quarterly: 1st and 4th, ermine, a saltire, gules St Patrick's Cross [representing Ireland] (FitzGerald dynasty); and 2d and 3d, argent, a chevron, gules, between three boars' heads, sable, langued, gules of (Judkin).
- Crest

The crest represents a chevalier in complete armour, on horseback, at full speed, with his sword drawn, and his beaver up.

- Seat: The Seat of baronets was Lisheen.
- Motto: unknown - see also Uniacke Unicus est & faithful and brave Fitzgerald Black & Green Knights of Glyn or Glin & Kerry Shanit a boo

== Ancestry ==
Ancestors of Judkin-Fitzgerald baronets

16. Maurice Uniacke
8. Thomas Uniacke
4. Thomas Uniacke
18. Sir Garrett FitzGerald of Lisquinlan and Corkbeg
9. Eleanor or Helena FitzGerald
19. Elizabeth Tynte widow of Ballycrenane, Co Cork
2. Col Robert Uniacke-FitzGerald of Lisquinlan and Corkbeg, co. Cork
10. Christian Borr of Bor Mount, Co Wexford
5. Helena Borr of Bor Mount, Co Wexford
11. Ellen Hore
1. Col Sir Thomas Judkin-FitzGerald 1st Bt of Lisheen, Co Tipperary
6. Judge John Lepp Judkin of Cashel, Co Tipperary
3. Frances Lepp Judkin of Greenhills, Co Tipperary

Baronetage of the United Kingdom
| Preceded by Hardinge baronets | Judkin-Fitzgerald baronets of Lisheen; 5 August 1801 | Succeeded by Goold baronets |
