= PS Nimrod =

19th century shipwreck

Coordinates: 51.91025°N 5.29924°W

History

United Kingdom
- Name: Nimrod
- Owner: Cork Steamship Co. Ltd.
- Route: Cork to Liverpool
- Builder: Vernon T. & Sons, Liverpool
- Launched: September 1843
- Out of service: 28 February 1860
- Fate: Ran aground (wrecked)

General characteristics
- Class & type: Coastal paddle steamer
- Tonnage: 583 GRT
- Length: 53.9 m (177 ft)
- Height: 7.6 m (25 ft)
- Installed power: 300 ihp (224 kW)
- Propulsion: side lever engines
- Speed: 10 knots (19 km/h; 12 mph)

PS Nimrod was an Irish passenger-carrying paddle steamer. Built in 1843, it took passengers from Cork in the south of Ireland to the ports of Liverpool, the first leg for emigrants wishing to start a new life in the United States. It operated for 17 years, until it ran aground at St David's Head in 1860. It smashed into three pieces and sank, with the loss of 45 lives.

== History ==
The PS Nimrod was a paddle steamer built by Vernon T. & Sons, in Liverpool in 1843. Owned by the Cork Steamship Co., its main use was to ferry passengers from Cork, Ireland to the ports of Liverpool, where they would take a passenger ship to the United States. An iron built steamer, Nimrod had a gross register tonnage of 582 tons and was rigged with sails in the event of engine problems.

On 27 February 1860, under the command of captain Lyall, Nimrod was making the journey from Liverpool to Cork. Carrying passengers and some general goods to the sum of £7,000 it experienced a problem with its engines roughly 15 miles from Smalls Lighthouse. After failing to negotiate the price of being towed by the Cork to Milford ferry, City of Paris, the captain made the decision to set sail for the deep ports of Milford Haven in the south of Wales. En route the weather worsened and what started as a moderate breeze became a gale-force storm. Nimrod was observed in the morning of 28 February, with sails now tattered, off the St David's Head, being driven to the cliffs. The captain ordered both her anchors to be lowered which at first appeared to save the ship, but both anchor chains broke and the ship was dashed onto the cliffs. Would be rescuers on the rocks attempted to cast ropes to the ship, and the crew attempted to cast ropes ashore, but all attempts failed. The ship eventually broke up and sank. All 25 crew and 20 passengers died in the accident. Of note among the dead was Sir John Judkin-FitzGerald 2nd Bt of the Judkin-FitzGerald baronets of Lisheen, Co Tipperary.

== Wreck ==
The wreck of Nimrod is located in three sections in the Porth Llong Cove off St David's Head. Lying in 20 metres (66 ft) of water, the ship broke into stern, bow and engine. In 1999 divers recovered items from the wreck, including cutlery and glassware.
