= Gualcamayo mine =

Gold mine in San Juan, Argentina

Coordinates: 29.7231°S 68.6508°W

- Interactive map of Gualcamayo mine
- Location: San Juan Province, Argentina
- Products: Gold
- Company: Mineros

The Gualcamayo mine is one of the largest gold mines in Argentina and in the world. The mine is located in the north-western part of Argentina in San Juan Province. The mine has estimated reserves of 3.3 million oz of gold.
