= Environmental courts of Chile =

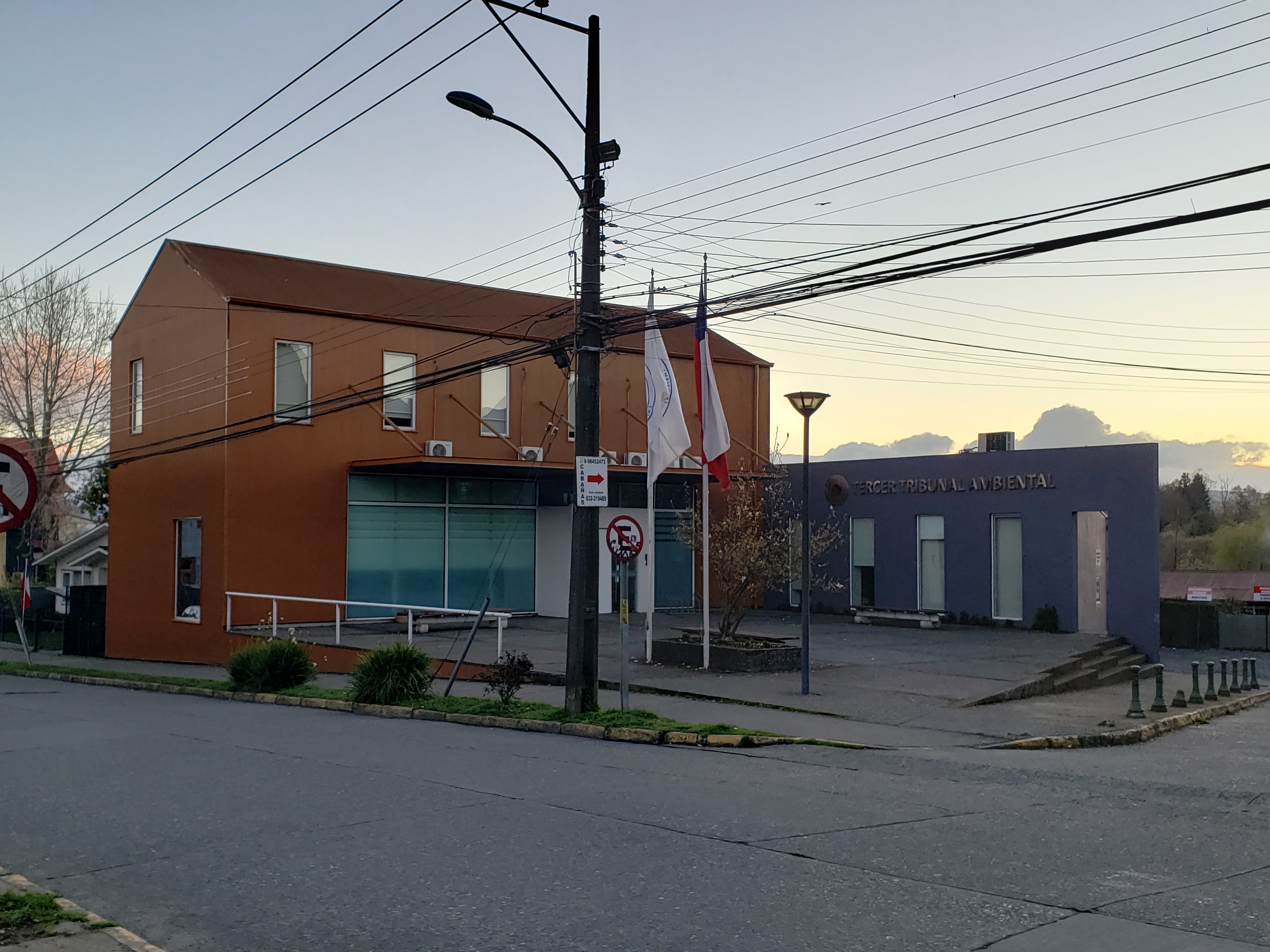
Building of the Third Environmental Court of Valdivia.

The Environmental Courts of Chile (Spanish: Tribunales Ambientales) is a system of three courts in Chile with jurisdiction over environmental matters. These courts are the First Environmental Court of Antofagasta covering the north, the Second Environmental Court of Santiago covering the center, and the Third Environmental Court of Valdivia covering the south. Among the most recurrent complaints received in the environmental courts are those on environmental damages and those questioning the legality of government agency decisions about environmental issues. The origin of the courts has been traced to pressure from environmental citizen's movements and from the entry of Chile into the OECD in 2010. According to lawyer Luis Cordero there was also a dissatisfaction with how ordinary courts handled environmental cases which were perceived by some as lacking expertise in environmental law and highly technical environmental issues.

Each court has three ministers who have been lawyers. Some cases judged by the environmental courts can be taken to the appellate court (Spanish: Corte de Apelaciones) of the city in which the court resides.

Name	Seat city	Regions served
First Environmental Court of Antofagasta; Primer Tribunal Ambiental de Antofagasta	Antofagasta	Arica y Parinacota; Tarapacá; Antofagasta; Atacama; Coquimbo
Second Environmental Court of Santiago; Segundo Tribunal Ambiental de Santiago	Santiago	Valparaíso; Santiago; O'Higgins; Maule
Third Environmental Court of Valdivia; Tercer Tribunal Ambiental de Valdivia	Valdivia	Ñuble; Biobío; Araucanía; Los Ríos; Los Lagos; Aysén; Magallanes
