= Lisheen Mine =

Mine in County Tipperary, Ireland

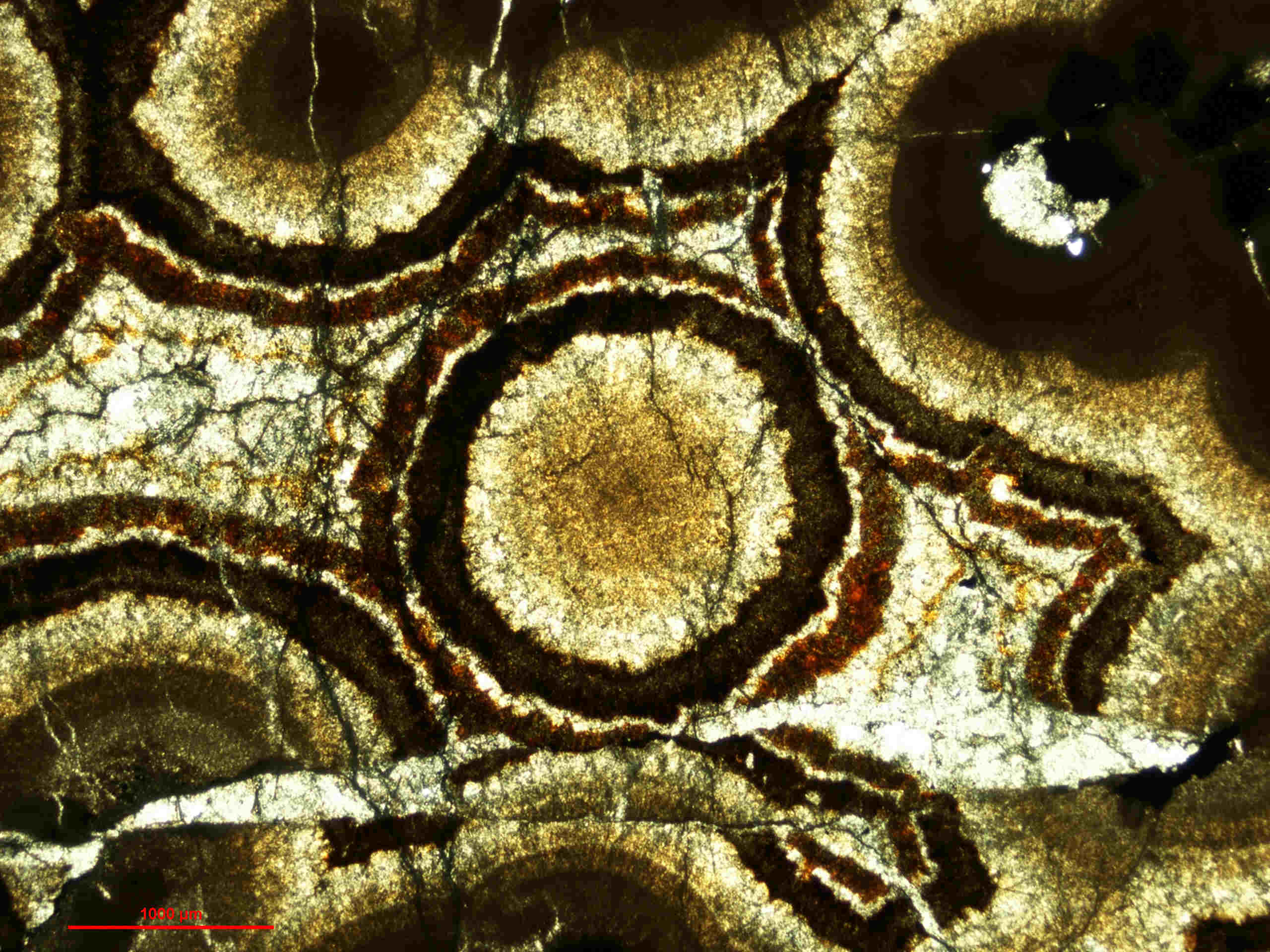
- Sphalerite (a crystal of zinc sulfide and iron) from Lisheen Mines

- Location within Ireland
- Location: Templetuohy, County Tipperary, Ireland; 52°44′52″N 07°40′24″W
- Products: lead, zinc, silver
- Type: carbonate-hosted lead-zinc ore deposits
- Greatest depth: 200 metres (660 ft)
- Discovered: 1990
- Opened: 1999
- Closed: 2015
- Company: Vedanta Resources
- Website: www.vedanta-zincinternational.com/our-operations/lisheen-mine

Lisheen Mine is a former lead-zinc-silver mine located between the villages of Moyne and Templetuohy in County Tipperary, Ireland. In the Rathdowney Trend, Lisheen was an underground mine where the Lisheen deposit lies at an average depth of 170 metres (560 feet) below surface. The mine closed in 2015.

== Accidents and incidents ==
The Lisheen Mine had two fatal accidents within two years. The first was an explosion in April 2011, and the second occurred on 4 April 2013 when a roof collapsed. In each case, a man died.

== History ==
The Lisheen Deposit was discovered in April 1990 by Murray Hitzman who at the time was working for Chevron. A full feasibility study was conducted by SRK, Kilborn, and Kelsey Engineering and development of the mine began in 1997. In September 1999 the first (production) ore was brought to the surface and in December the first shipment of Zinc concentrates departed from the Port of Cork. Lisheen was expected to produce approximately 4.83 million dry metric tonnes of zinc and lead concentrates over the estimated 14-year lifespan of the mine.

The mine was accessed via a 1.5 kilometre long decline, at –15%, 6.3 metres wide by 5 metres high. Underground drilling rigs bore holes in the ore face, which were charged with explosives and fired. The resultant broken ore was removed by large Load Haul Dump (LHD) machines and loaded into trucks which transported the ore to the crusher. The ore was first emptied onto 'grizzly' bars which prevent oversized material from entering the crushing chamber before being fed into the underground crusher. Approximately 6,300 tonnes of ore-grade material was transported daily via a conveyor system from the mine to the surface where it was stored in a covered stockpile of approximately 12,000 tonnes live capacity prior to processing in the Concentrator plant. Following various process the concentrate was then trucked south to Cork for onward shipment to various customers.

Until its closure, the mine was owned and operated by Vedanta Resources Zinc International, being acquired from Anglo American in 2011.

In total, 22.4 million tonnes of ore were produced, at an average grade of 11.63% zinc, 1.96% lead and 26 ppm silver.

== See also ==
- Judkin-Fitzgerald Baronets, of Lisheen (1801)
- Sedimentary exhalative deposits
- Ore genesis
- Mining
- Tara Mine
- Galmoy Mine
