= Copiapó Province =

Copiapó Province Provincia de Copiapó
- Province
- Seal

- Location in the Atacama Region

- Location in Chile
- Coordinates: 27°27′S 70°00′W
- Country: Chile
- Region: Atacama
- Capital: Copiapó
- Communes: Copiapó; Caldera; Tierra Amarilla

Government
  - Type: Provincial
  - Presidential Provincial Delegate 3: None

Area
  - Total: 32,538.5 km^{2} (12,563.2 sq mi)

Population (2012 Census)
  - Total: 183,973
  - Density: 5.65401/km^{2} (14.6438/sq mi)
  - Urban: 148,101
  - Rural: 7,612

Sex
  - Men: 79,436
  - Women: 76,277
- Time zone: UTC-4 (CLT)
  - Summer (DST): UTC-3 (CLST)
- Area code: 56 + 52

Copiapó Province (Spanish: Provincia de Copiapó) is one of three provinces of the northern Chilean region of Atacama (III). Its capital is the city of Copiapó.

== Geography and demography ==
According to the 2012 census by the National Statistics Institute (INE), the province spans an area of 32,538.5 km^{2} (12,563 sq mi) and had a population of 183,973 inhabitants, giving it a population density of 4.8/km^{2} (12/sq mi). It is the tenth largest province in the country. Between the 1992 and 2002 censuses, the population grew by 24.9% (31,021 persons).

== Administration ==
As a province, Copiapó is a second-level administrative division of Chile, which is further divided into three communes (comunas). The province is administered by a presidentially appointed regional delegate.

=== Communes ===
1. Copiapó
2. Caldera
3. Tierra Amarilla
