= Currais Novos mine =

Tungsten mine in Brazil

- Location within Brazil
- Location: Northeast Region, Brazil; 6°15′55.79″S 36°31′1.85″W (estimated)
- Products: Tungsten

The Currais Novos mine is a large open pit mine located in Rio Grande do Norte state of Brazil. Its purpose is the recovery of tungsten from two tailings piles, from the Barra Verde and Boca de Laje mines. Currais Novos represents one of the largest tungsten reserves in Brazil having estimated reserves of 4.31 million tonnes of ore grading 0.1% tungsten.
