= Tara Mines =

Zinc and lead mine in Ireland

Tara Mine
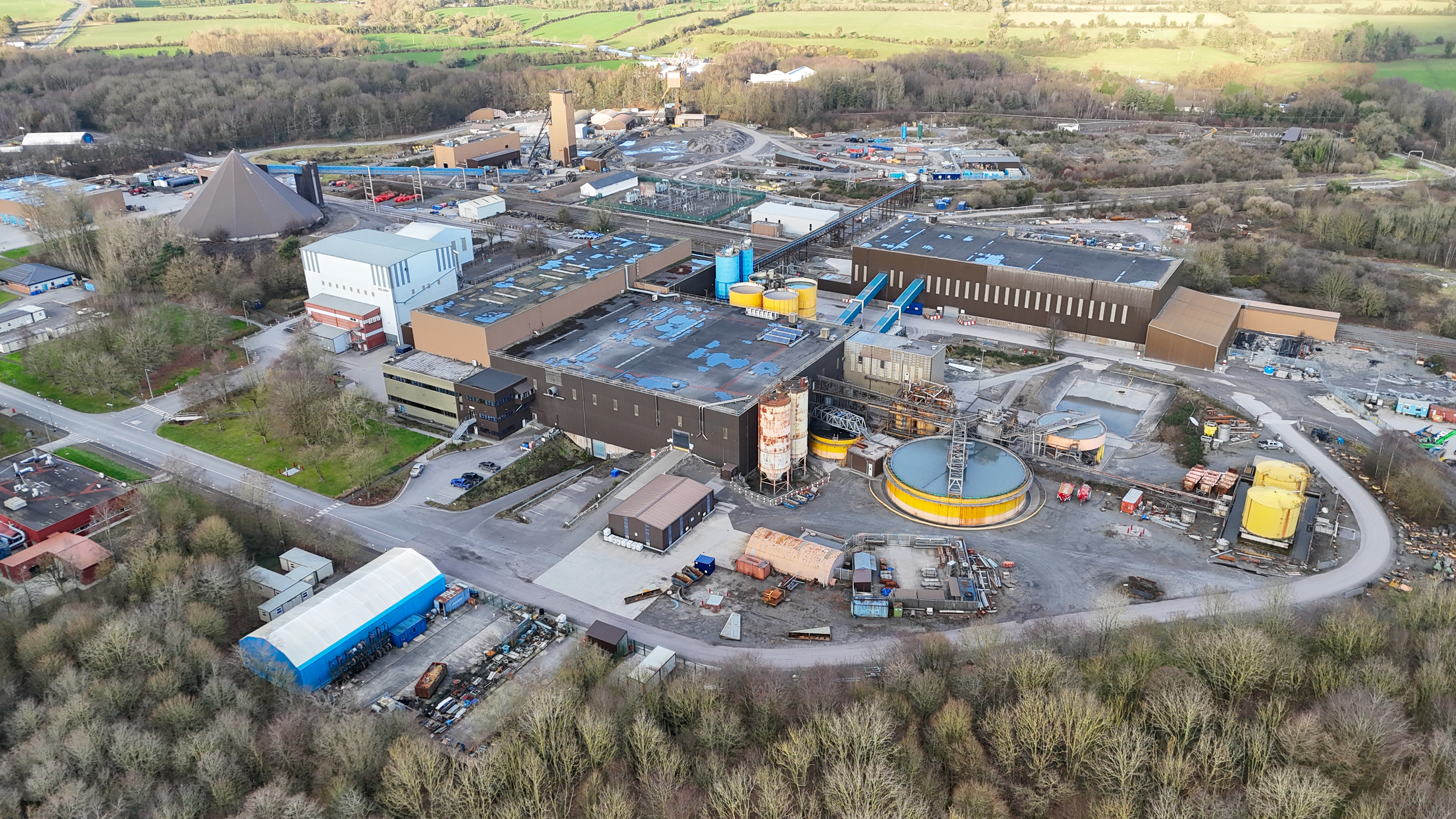

- Location within Ireland
- Location: Navan, County Meath, Ireland; 53°39′19″N 06°42′54″W
- Products: lead, zinc
- Type: carbonate-hosted lead-zinc ore deposits
- Greatest depth: 1,000 metres (3,300 ft)
- Opened: 1977
- Company: Boliden
- Website: www.boliden.com/operations/mines/boliden-tara

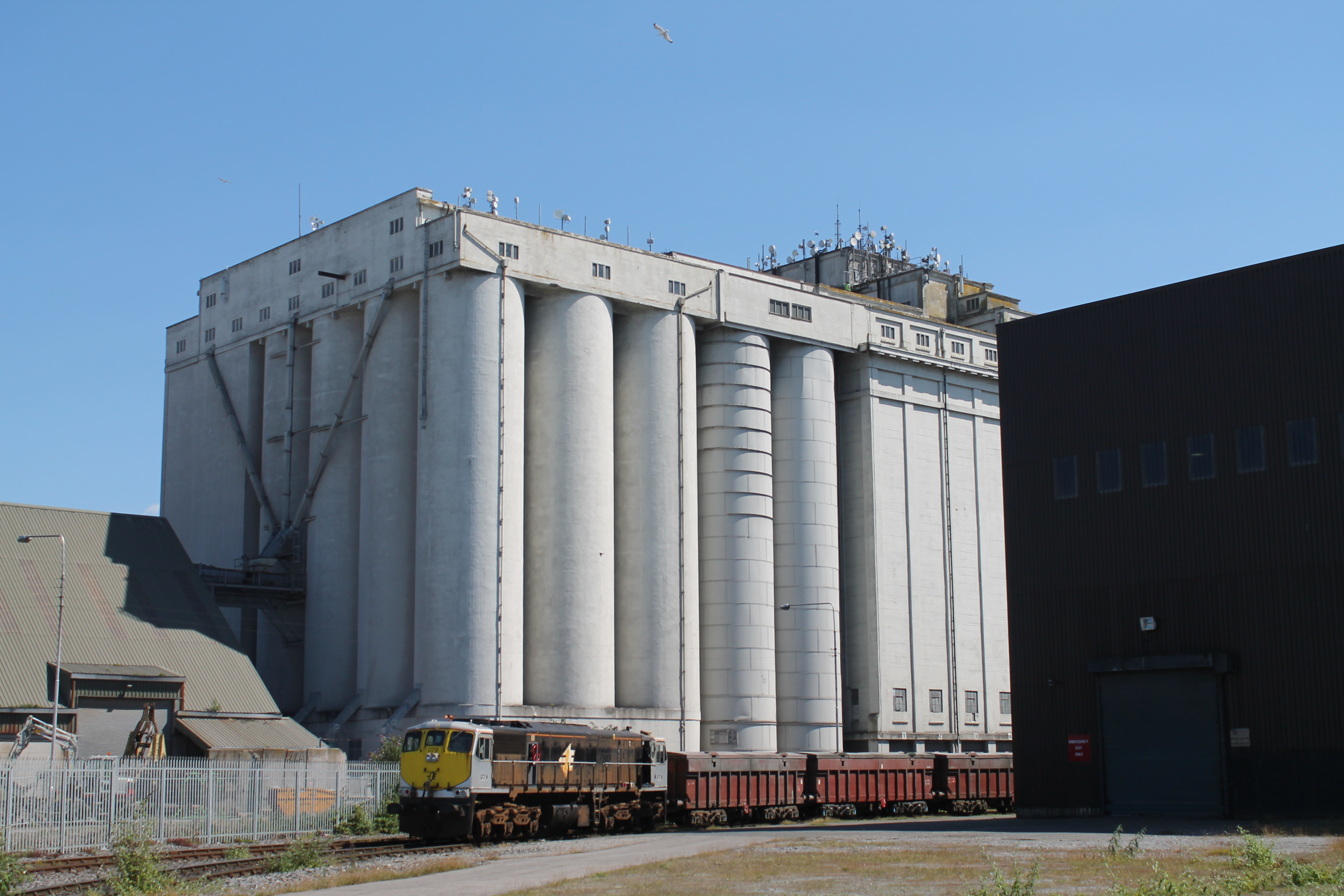
Iarnród Éireann 071 Class Shunting a train of ore at the terminal on Alexandra Road, Dublin Port.

Tara Mines is a zinc and lead mine near Navan, County Meath, Ireland. Tara is an underground mine where the orebody lies between 50–900 metres (160–2,950 ft) below the surface. The orebody is within the carbonate-hosted lead-zinc ore deposits of the Navan Deposit.

The deposit was discovered in 1970 by Brian Byrne in conjunction with Derek Michael Romer while working for Pat Hughes' Northgate Exploration. Development started in 1973 and production began in 1977. Tara Mine is operated by Boliden, who acquired the mine in 2004. It is the largest zinc mine in Europe and the eighth largest in the world producing 200,000 tonnes (200,000 long tons; 220,000 short tons) of zinc concentrate and 40,000 tonnes (39,000 long tons; 44,000 short tons) of lead concentrate annually.

Broken ore is delivered to one of five underground crushers and reduced in size to less than 150 millimetres (5.9 in) before being carried by conveyor to a 3,600-tonne (3,500-long-ton; 4,000-short-ton) capacity storage bin at the base of the production shaft. Skip loading and hoisting are automatic. Ore is supplied, at an hourly rate of 570 tonnes (560 long tons; 630 short tons), to the surface coarse ore storage building, with a 30,000-tonne (30,000-long-ton; 33,000-short-ton) capacity, known as the Tepee. The concentrates are shipped via Dublin Port to Boliden's smelters in Kokkola, Finland and Odda, Norway and to other smelters throughout Europe. Tara Mines is connected by railway to Drogheda via Navan, where daily loads of ore are sent to Dublin Port.

Due to low zinc prices, production was halted between 2001 and 2003. In 2009 production was again threatened as demand for zinc, used to galvanise steel for the car and construction industries, declined sharply due to the slowdown in the global economy. The mine was temporarily closed again in July 2023 due low zinc prices and increased energy costs. It was reopened at the end of 2024.

A brand new Autogenous Grinding mill, which replaces large sections of the original crushing and grinding plant, became operational in October 2009.

Production at the mine temporarily ceased when the mine was flooded in 2021. It again stopped operating in 2023 after production was suspended due to high costs, temporarily laying off 650 employees. Following an agreement with the Workplace Relations Commission, the mines returned to operation in October 2024.
