= List of companies of North Korea =

Location of North Korea

North Korea is a country in East Asia, in the northern part of the Korean Peninsula. It claims sovereignty over South Korea. Over time North Korea has gradually distanced itself away from the world communist movement. Juche, an ideology of national self-reliance, was introduced into the constitution as a "creative application of Marxism–Leninism" in 1972. The means of production are owned by the state through state-run enterprises and collectivized farms. Most services such as healthcare, housing, and food production are subsidized or state-funded. From 1994 to 1998, North Korea suffered from a famine that resulted in the deaths of between 0.24 and 3.5 million people, and the country continues to struggle with food production. North Korea follows Songun, or "military-first" policy. It is the country with the highest number of military and paramilitary personnel, with a total of 9,495,000 active, reserve, and paramilitary personnel. Its active duty army of 1.21 million is the fourth largest in the world, after China, the United States, and India.

Due to the command economy of North Korea, there are relatively few companies in North Korea and they are all managed by the government.

== Notable firms ==
This list includes notable companies with primary headquarters located in the country. The industry and sector follow the Industry Classification Benchmark taxonomy. Organizations which have ceased operations are included and noted as defunct.

Notable companies Status: P=Private, S=State; A=Active, D=Defunct
Name	Industry	Sector	Headquarters	Founded	Notes	Status	
Air Koryo	Consumer services	Airlines	Pyongyang	1950	Flag carrier	S	A
Central Bank of the Democratic People's Republic of Korea	Financials	Banks	Pyongyang	1959	Central bank	S	A
Foreign Languages Publishing House	Consumer services	Publishing	Pyongyang	1949	Publishing	S	A
Foreign Trade Bank of the Democratic People's Republic of Korea	Financials	Banks	Pyongyang	2005	Bank	S	A
Kangsong NET	Telecommunications	Mobile telecommunications	Pyongyang	2015	3G and 4G provider	S	A
Kim Chong-t'ae Electric Locomotive Works	Industrials	Railroads	Pyongyang	1945	Railways	S	A
Korea Computer Center	Technology	Internet	Pyongyang	1990	IT research, internet	S	A
Korea General Chemicals Trading	Basic materials	Commodity chemicals	Pyongyang	1965	Chemical group, plastics	S	A
Korea General Machinery Trading Corporation	Industrials	Diversified industrials	Pyongyang	1954	Machine tools, hydroelectrics	S	A
Korea General Magnesia Clinker Industry Group	Basic materials	Nonferrous metals	Pyongyang	?	Heavy industrial group, non-ferrous metals, mining	S	A
Korea General Zinc Industry Group	Basic materials	Nonferrous metals	Pyongyang	?	Non-ferrous metals, mining	S	A
Korea Mining and Development Trading Corporation	Industrials	Defense	Pyongyang	?	State-owned arms dealer	S	A
Korea Ponghwa General Corporation	Consumer goods	Clothing & accessories	Pyongyang	?	Light industrial group, clothing, rucksacks, bags	S	A
Korea Sinhung Trading Corporation	Consumer goods	Durable household products	Pyongyang	?	Household appliances and furniture	S	A
Korea Sogyong Trading Corporation	Consumer goods	Tobacco	Pyongyang	?	Carpets, tobacco	S	A
Korea Unha General Trading Corporation	Consumer goods	Clothing & accessories	Pyongyang	?	Import/export, textiles	S	A
Korean Ocean Shipping Agency	Industrials	Marine transportation	Pyongyang	1956	Shipping, pilotage, logistics	S	A
Koryolink	Telecommunications	Mobile telecommunications	Pyongyang	2008	3G provider, part of Veon (Netherlands)	P	A
Mansudae Art Studio	Consumer services	Broadcasting & entertainment	Pyongyang	1959	Art studio	S	A
Mansudae Overseas Project Group of Companies	Industrials	Heavy construction	Pyongyang	1967	Monuments and memorials, part of Mansudae Art Studio	S	A
Naegohyang	Various	Various			Multi-industry congloerate	S	A
Noko Jeans	Consumer goods	Clothing & accessories	Pyongyang	2007	First denim jeans production company in North Korea, defunct 2011	P	D
Nosotek	Technology	Computer services	Pyongyang	2008	IT joint venture	P	A
Okryu-gwan	Consumer services	Restaurants & bars	Pyongyang	1960	Restaurant in Pyongyang	S	A
Pyongyang	Consumer services	Restaurants & bars	Pyongyang	?	Restaurant chain	S	A
Pyongyang Chewing Gum Factory	Consumer goods	Food products	Pyongyang	2003	Gum	S	A
Ryonbong	Industrials	Industrial machinery	Pyongyang	?	Machine/materials export	S	A
SEK Studio	Consumer services	Broadcasting & entertainment	Pyongyang	1957	Animation services	S	A
Sungri Motor Plant	Industrials	Industrial Machinery	Tokchon	1950	Motors	S	A
SunNet	Telecommunications	Mobile telecommunications	Pyongyang	2002	Mobile network, defunct 2010	P	D
Taedonggang Brewing Company	Consumer goods	Brewers	Pyongyang	2000	Brewery	S	A
Taep'oong International Investment Group of Korea	Financials	Investment services	Pyongyang	?	Investments	S	A

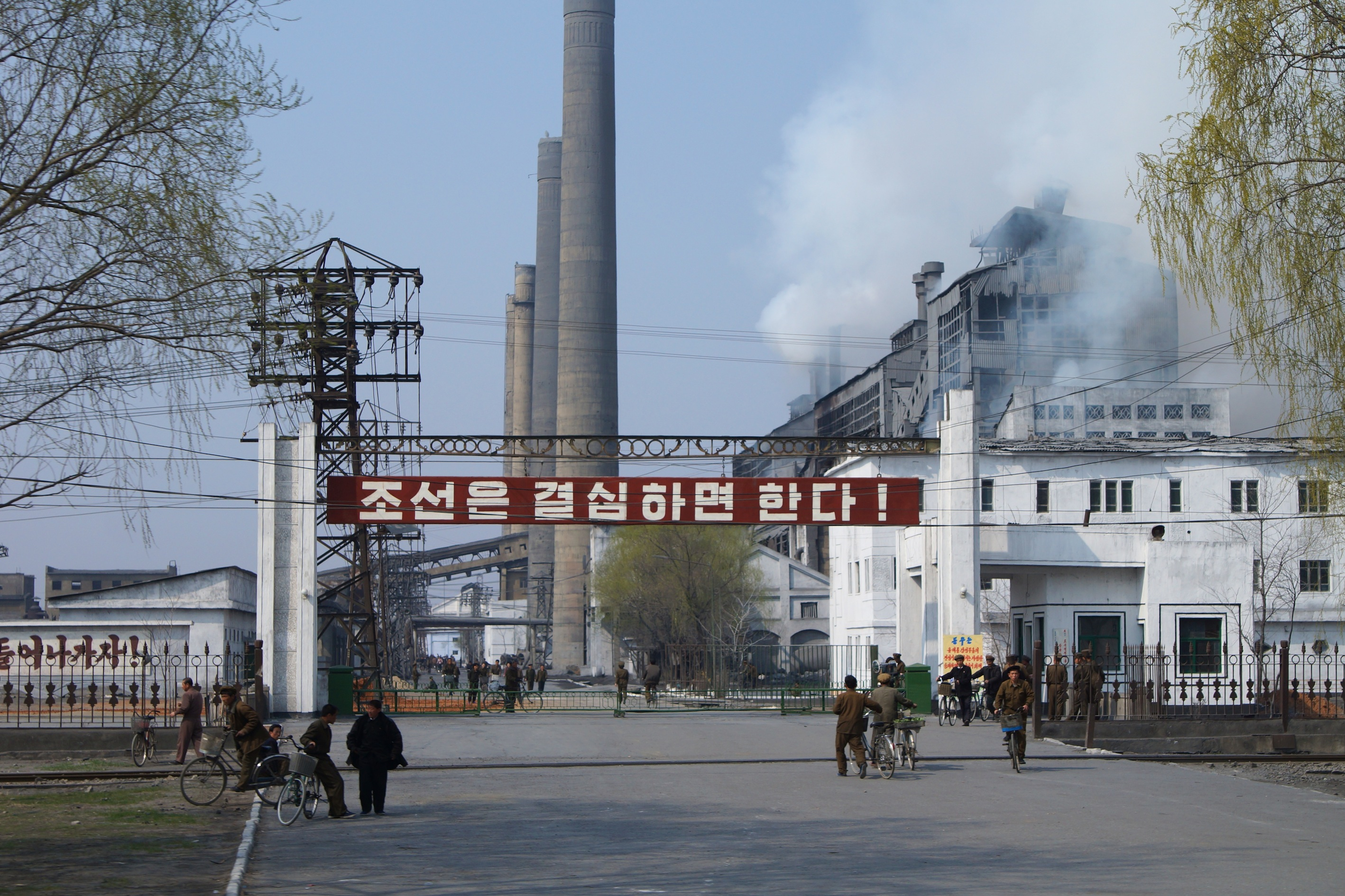
An industrial plant in Hamhung.

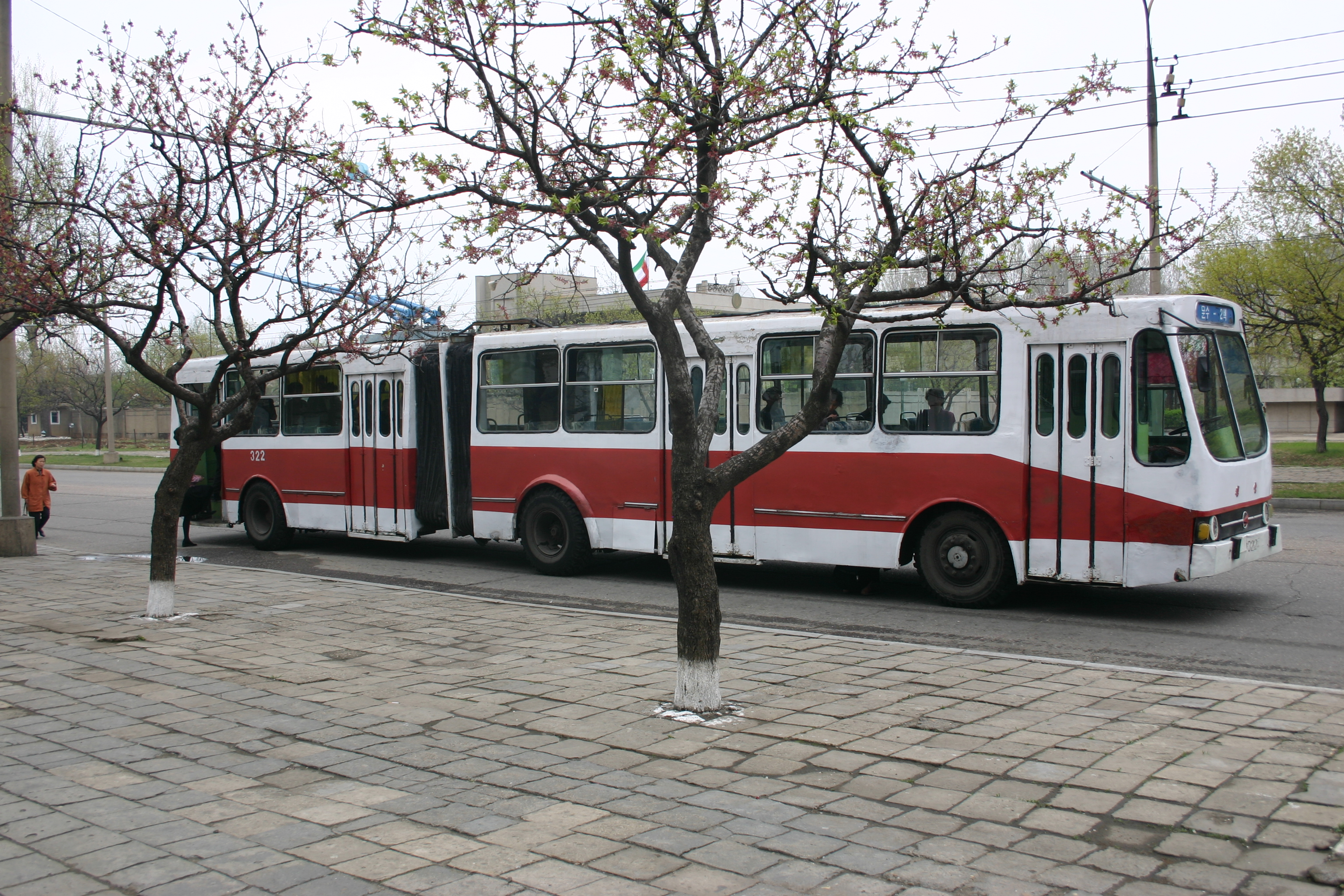
A North Korean manufactured trolleybus, a Chollima 90.

== See also ==
- Foreign Trade of the DPRK
- Naenara
