= List of mining companies =

This is an incomplete alphabetical list of mining companies.

== A ==
- Adex Mining
- Aditya Birla Group
- African Rainbow Minerals
- Agnico Eagle
- Aiteo
- Almonty Industries
- Alumina
- Anaconda Copper
- Andes Iron
- Anglo American (mining)
- Anglo American Sur
- Anglo Platinum
- AngloGold Ashanti
- Antofagasta Minerals
- Aricom
- Arctic Canadian Diamond Company
- Astra Resources
- Atalaya Mining
- Aurubis
- Avalon Advanced Materials

== B ==
- Bard Ventures Company
- Barrick Gold
- BHP
- Blaafarveværket
- Blackfire Exploration
- Boliden
- Bougainville Copper
- Breakwater Resources

== C ==
- Cambior
- Candente Copper
- Canico Resource
- Cape Breton Development Corporation
- Capstone Copper
- Chinalco
- China Molybdenum
- Cleveland-Cliffs
- CNK International
- Coal & Allied
- Coal India
- Codelco
- Colorado Fuel & Iron
- Compañía Minera del Pacífico
- Companhia Siderúrgica Nacional
- Compass Minerals
- Compass Resources
- Cosayach
- Consolidated Zinc
- Cordero Mining Company
- Crowflight Minerals
- Cuniptau Mines
- Cuprom
- Cyprus Mines Corporation

== D ==
- De Beers
- Debswana
- Doe Run Company
- Dominion Steel and Coal Corporation
- Drummond Company
- Dundee Corporation

== E ==
- Echo Bay Mines
- Eldorado Gold
- Eldorado Resources
- Empire Zinc Company
- Empresa Nacional de Minería
- ENDIAMA
- Energy Resources of Australia

== F ==
- Falconbridge Nickel Mines
- First Quantum Minerals
- FNX Mining
- Fortescue
- Freeport-McMoRan

== G ==
- Gécamines
- Glamis Gold
- Glencore
- Gogebic Taconite
- Gold Fields
- Gold Reserve
- Goldcorp
- Growmax Resources
- Grupo México

== H ==
- Haldeman Mining
- Harmony Gold
- Hearst, Haggin, Tevis and Co.
- Hillsborough Resources
- Hindustan Zinc
- Hochschild Mining
- Hollinger Mines

== I ==
- International Coal Group
- Iron Ore Company of Canada

== K ==
- Kazakhmys
- Kenmare Resources
- Kennecott Utah Copper
- KGHM Polska Miedz
- Kinross Gold
- Korea General Magnesia Clinker Industry Group
- Korea General Zinc Industry Group

== L ==
- LKAB
- Lonmin
- Lucara Diamond
- Lundin Mining
- Luzenac Group

== M ==
- Ma'aden
- Managem
- Martin Marietta Materials
- Massey Energy
- Metallica Resources
- Minera Escondida
- Mineral Resources
- MMG
- Mond Nickel Company
- Mosaic
- Mount Lyell Mining & Railway Company
- MSPL

== N ==
- Nan Nan Resources
- NERCO
- Nevsun Resources
- New Hope Group
- New Jersey Zinc Company
- Newcrest
- Newmont
- Nirex
- Noranda
- Nordic Mining
- North American Palladium
- North Limited
- Northern Star Resources
- NovaGold Resources

== O ==
- Orex Exploration
- Outokumpu

== P ==
- Pacific Coast Borax Company
- Palabora Mining Company
- Pampa Norte
- Pan American Silver Corporation
- Pasminco
- Peko-Wallsend
- Peter Hambro Mining
- Petra Diamonds
- Phelps Dodge
- Pilbara Iron
- Polymetal
- Polyus Gold
- PotashCorp

== Q ==
- QCoal
- QIT-Fer et Titane
- QIT Madagascar Minerals

== R ==
- Reading Anthracite Company
- Rio Tinto
- Rio Tinto Coal Australia
- Rockwell Diamonds

== S ==
- Saskatchewan Minerals
- Semafo
- Sesa Goa
- Sherritt International
- Sibanye Gold
- Siberian Business Union
- Sifto Canada
- Silver Standard Resources
- Silver Wheaton
- Silvercorp Metals
- Sociedad Química y Minera
- Soma Kömür İşletmeleri A.Ş.
- South32
- South American Silver Corporation
- ST International
- Store Norske Spitsbergen Kulkompani

== T ==
- Teck Cominco
- Thompson Creek Metals
- Titanium Resources Group
- Tiwest Joint Venture

== U ==
- UK Coal

== V ==
- Vale
- Vale Inco
- Vedanta Resources
- Victor-American Fuel Company
- Vulcan Materials Company

== W ==
- Walter Energy

== X ==
- Xstrata

== Y ==
- Yamana Gold
- Yancoal

== Z ==
- Zinifex
