= TSX Venture 50 =

The TSX Venture 50 is a yearly ranking done by the TMX Group of 50 upcoming companies on the TSX Venture Exchange.

The list is chosen annually by assigning equal weighting assigned to share price appreciation, trading volume, market capitalization growth and analyst coverage.

== 2020 TSX Venture 50 ==
The 2020 TSX Venture 50 was released on December 31, 2019. The top performing companies from each industry sector are:

Symbol	Company	Industry
DYA	dynaCERT Inc.	Clean Technology & Life Sciences
WELL	Well Health Technologies Corp.	Diversified Industries
TAL	PetroTal Corp.	Energy
BTU	BTU Metals Corp.	Mining
SCR	Score Media and Gaming Inc.	Technology

Entry in italic text indicates number 1 company overall

== 2019 TSX Venture 50 ==
The 2019 TSX Venture 50 was released on December 31, 2018. The top performing companies from each industry sector are:

Symbol	Company	Industry
ALEF	Aleafia Health Inc.	Clean Technology & Life Sciences
SCR	theScore, Inc.	Diversified Industries
ALV	Alvopetro Energy Ltd.	Energy
WHN	Westhaven Ventures Inc.	Mining
PNG	Kraken Robotics Inc.	Technology

Entry in italic text indicates number 1 company overall

== 2018 TSX Venture 50 ==
The 2018 TSX Venture 50 was released on December 31, 2017. The top performing companies from each industry sector are:

Symbol	Company	Industry
EMH	Emerald Health Therapeutics, Inc.	Clean Technology & Life Sciences
RTI	Radient Technologies Inc.	Diversified Industries
GIII	GEN III Oil Corporation	Energy & Energy Services
GGI	Garibaldi Resources Corp.	Mining
RHT	Reliq Health Technologies Inc.	Technology

Entry in italic text indicates number 1 company overall

== 2017 TSX Venture 50 ==
The 2017 TSX Venture 50 was released on December 31, 2016. The top performing companies from each industry sector are:

Symbol	Company	Industry
DYA	dynaCERT Inc.	Clean Technology & Life Sciences
MJN	Cronos Group Inc.	Diversified Industries
LIX	Lithium X Energy Corp.	Mining
BBI	Blackbird Energy Inc.	Oil & Gas
PEEK	Keek Inc.	Technology

Entry in italic text indicates number 1 company overall

The full list of companies in the 2017 TSX Venture 50 is:

Symbol	Company	Sector
AT	AcuityAds Holdings Inc.	Technology
AFE	Africa Energy Corp.	Oil & Gas
APH	Aphria Inc.	Clean Technology & Life Sciences
BBI	Blackbird Energy Inc.	Oil & Gas
BKD	Breaking Data Corp.	Technology
BTL	BTL Group Ltd.	Technology
CDN	CanaDream Corporation	Diversified Industries
CZO	Ceapro Inc.	Clean Technology & Life Sciences
CDB	Cordoba Minerals Corp.	Mining
MJN	Cronos Group Inc.	Diversified Industries
DLS	DealNet Capital Corp.	Diversified Industries
DYA	dynaCERT Inc.	Clean Technology & Life Sciences
ESU	EEStor Corporation	Clean Technology & Life Sciences
EMH	Emerald Health Therapeutics, Inc.	Clean Technology & Life Sciences
EGD	Energold Drilling Corp.	Diversified Industries
FRK	Front Range Resources Ltd.	Oil & Gas
GSI	Gatekeeper Systems Inc.	Technology
GRG	Golden Arrow Resources Corporation	Mining
GPY	Golden Predator Mining Corp.	Mining
GOLD	Goldmining Inc.	Mining
BUS	Grande West Transportation Group Inc.	Diversified Industries
JTR	GreenSpace Brands Inc.	Diversified Industries
IKM	Ikkuma Resources Corp.	Oil & Gas
IPT	IMPACT Silver Corp.	Mining
JSE	Jadestone Energy Inc.	Oil & Gas
JNX	Junex Inc.	Oil & Gas
PEEK	Keek Inc.	Technology
LXE	Leucrotta Exploration Inc.	Oil & Gas
LIX	Lithium X Energy Corp.	Mining
OEE	Memex Inc.	Technology
MT	Mettrum Health Corp.	Clean Technology & Life Sciences
NNO	Nano One Materials Corp.	Clean Technology & Life Sciences
NXO	NexOptic Technology Corp.	Technology
OPS	OPSENS Inc.	Technology
OGI	OrganiGram Holdings Inc.	Clean Technology & Life Sciences
PTF	Pender Growth Fund Inc.	Diversified Industries
PHO	Photon Control Inc.	Technology
PTE	Pioneering Technology Corp.	Clean Technology & Life Sciences
PGM	Pure Gold Mining Inc.	Mining
SIL	SilverCrest Metals Inc.	Mining
SVI	StorageVault Canada Inc.	Diversified Industries
SRX	Storm Resources Ltd.	Oil & Gas
SY	Symbility Solutions Inc.	Technology
TWM	Tidewater Midstream and Infrastructure Ltd.	Diversified Industries
TOO	Toro Oil & Gas Ltd.	Oil & Gas
VIT	Victoria Gold Corp.	Mining
WEE	Wavefront Technology Solutions Inc.	Clean Technology & Life Sciences
WML	Wealth Minerals Ltd.	Mining
WIL	Wilton Resources Inc.	Oil & Gas
RNK	Wow Unlimited Media Inc.	Diversified Industries

== 2016 TSX Venture 50 ==
The 2016 TSX Venture 50 was released on December 31, 2015. The top performing companies from each industry sector are:

Symbol	Company	Industry
NPH	VANC Pharmaceuticals Inc.	Clean Technology & Life Sciences
PTG	Pivot Technology Solutions Inc.	Technology
PE	Pure Energy Minerals Limited	Mining
PQD	Petrodorado Energy Ltd.	Oil & Gas
LM	Lingo Media Corporation	Technology & Life Sciences

Entry in italic text indicates number 1 company overall

== 2015 TSX Venture 50 ==
The 2015 TSX Venture 50 was released on December 31, 2014. The top performing companies from each industry sector are:

Symbol	Company	Industry
LPS	Legend Power Systems Inc.	Clean Technology & Renewable Energy
SCR	theScore, Inc.	Diversified Industries
NB	Niocorp Developments Ltd.	Mining
IKM	Ikkuma Resources Corp.	Oil & Gas
PHM	Patient Home Monitoring Corp.	Technology & Life Sciences

Entry in italic text indicates number 1 company overall

== 2014 TSX Venture 50 ==
The 2014 TSX Venture 50 was released on February 12, 2014. The top performing companies from each industry sector are:

Symbol	Company	Industry
QST	Questor Technology Inc.	Clean Technology
MCR	Macro Enterprises Inc.	Diversified Industries
ZEN	Zenyatta Ventures Ltd.	Mining
ALX	Alexander Energy Ltd.	Oil & Gas
KLH	Stellar Biotechnologies Inc.	Technology & Life Sciences

Entry in italic text indicates number 1 company overall

== 2013 TSX Venture 50 ==
The 2013 TSX Venture 50 was released on February 13, 2013. The top performing companies from each industry sector are:

Symbol	Company	Industry
OPL	OPEL Technologies Inc.	Clean Technology
LOY	Loyalist Group Limited	Diversified Industries
ZEN	Zenyatta Ventures Ltd.	Mining
AOI	Africa Oil Corp.	Oil & Gas
ICO	iCo Therapeutics Inc.	Technology & Life Sciences

Entry in italic text indicates number 1 company overall

== 2012 TSX Venture 50 ==
The 2012 TSX Venture 50 was released on February 15, 2012. The top performing companies from each industry sector are:

Symbol	Company	Industry
CVR	Canadian Oil Recovery & Remediation Enterprises Ltd.	Clean Technology
ISC	IROC Energy Services Corp.	Diversified Industries
ROG	Roxgold Inc.	Mining
PEA	Petrolia Inc.	Oil & Gas
VRS	Verisante Technology, Inc.	Technology & Life Sciences

Entry in italic text indicates number 1 company overall

The full list of companies in the 2012 TSX Venture 50 is:

Symbol	Company	Sector	Headquarters
AYA	Amaya Gaming Group Inc.	Technology & Life Sciences	Pointe-Claire, QC
BOE	Americas Petrogas Inc.	Oil & Gas	Calgary, AB
ARW	Aroway Energy Inc.	Oil & Gas	Vancouver, BC
AZA	Azabache Energy Inc.	Oil & Gas	Calgary, AB
BTI	biOasis Technologies Inc.	Technology & Life Sciences	Vancouver, BC
RX	BioSyent Inc.	Technology & Life Sciences	Toronto, ON
BLP	BluePoint Data, Inc.	Technology & Life Sciences	Boca Raton, FL
CVR	Canadian Oil Recovery & Remediation Enterprises Ltd.	Clean Technology	Toronto, ON
CEV	Cap-Ex Ventures Ltd.	Mining	Montreal, QC
CMI	C-Com Satellite Systems Inc.	Technology & Life Sciences	Ottawa, ON
OYL	CGX Energy Inc.	Oil & Gas	Toronto, ON
CWC	CWC Well Services Corp.	Diversified Industries	Calgary, AB
DAN	d'Arianne Resources Inc.	Mining	Chicoutimi, QC
DMA	DiaMedica Inc.	Technology & Life Sciences	Winnipeg, MB
DNI	DNI Metals Inc.	Mining	Toronto, ON
EGD	Energold Drilling Corp.	Diversified Industries	Vancouver, BC
ENW	EnWave Corporation	Clean Technology	Vancouver, BC
GWY	Galway Resources Ltd.	Mining	Toronto, ON
HEO	H2O Innovation Inc.	Clean Technology	Quebec City, QC
IZN	Iberian Minerals Corp.	Mining	Toronto, ON
IC	Innovative Composites International Inc.	Clean Technology	Toronto, ON
IGX	IntelGenx Technologies Corp.	Technology & Life Sciences	Montreal, QC
ISC	IROC Energy Services Corp.	Diversified Industries	Red Deer, AB
KLS	Kelso Technologies Inc.	Diversified Industries	Delta, BC
LEA	Leader Energy Services Ltd.	Diversified Industries	Calgary, AB
LSI	Lonestar West Inc.	Diversified Industries	Sylvan Lake, AB
MMT	Mart Resources Inc.	Oil & Gas	Calgary, AB
NAT	Naturally Advanced Technologies Inc.	Clean Technology	Victoria, BC
NES	Newstrike Capital Inc.	Mining	Vancouver, BC
OPL	OPEL Technologies Inc.	Clean Technology	Toronto, BC
PPY.A	Painted Pony Petroleum Ltd.	Oil & Gas	Calgary, AB
PRO	Pershimco Resources Inc.	Mining	Rouyn-Noranda, QC
POP	Petro One Energy Corp.	Oil & Gas	Vancouver, BC
PEA	Petrolia Inc.	Oil & Gas	Rimouski, QC
PDG	Prodigy Gold Inc.	Mining	Vancouver, BC
AAR.UN	Pure Industrial Real Estate Trust	Diversified Industries	Vancouver, BC
RMS	RMS Systems Inc.	Technology & Life Sciences	Calgary, AB
ROG	Roxgold Inc.	Mining	Toronto, ON
RPM	Rye Patch Gold Corp.	Mining	Vancouver, BC
SDS	Seair Inc.	Clean Technology	Spruce Grove, AB
TR.UN	Temple Real Estate Investment Trust	Diversified Industries	Winnipeg, MB
TLA	Titan Logix Corp.	Diversified Industries	Edmonton, AB
TMD	Titan Medical Inc.	Technology & Life Sciences	Toronto, ON
TIC	Titanium Corporation Inc.	Clean Technology	Calgary, AB
BTB.UN	UN BTB Real Estate Investment Trust	Diversified Industries	Montreal, QC
VRS	Verisante Technology, Inc.	Technology & Life Sciences	Vancouver, BC
WEE	Wavefront Technology Solutions Inc.	Clean Technology	Edmonton, AB
WND	Western Wind Energy Corp.	Clean Technology	Vancouver, BC
WZR	WesternZagros Resources Ltd.	Oil & Gas	Calgary, AB

== 2011 TSX Venture 50 ==
The 2011 TSX Venture 50 was released on 31 December 2010. The top performing companies from each industry sector are:

Symbol	Company	Industry
FSH	AgriMarine Holdings Inc.	Clean Technology
WRG	Western Energy Services Corp.	Diversified Industries
CUU	Copper Fox Metals Inc.	Mining
XEL	Xcite Energy Limited	Oil & Gas
TMD	Titan Medical Inc.	Technology & Life Sciences

Entry in italic text indicates number 1 company overall

== See also ==
- TSX Venture Exchange
- S&P/TSX 60
- S&P/TSX Composite
