= Anna Åbergsson =

Swedish activist

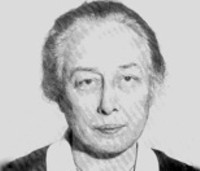
- Born: 6 January 1871; Stockholm, Sweden
- Died: 18 April 1937 (aged 66); Oscar parish, Stockholm
- Burial place: Norra begravningsplatsen, Stockholm
- Education: Stockholm University
- Occupations: Financial accountant, allotment gardening activist, social reformer
- Parents: Andreas Viktor Åbergsson; Augusta Resén

Anna Mathilda Augusta Åbergsson (6 January 1871 – 18 April 1937) was a leading figure in the Swedish allotment garden movement.

== Personal life ==
Anna Åbergsson was born in Stockholm in 1871 to Andreas Viktor Åbergsson (26 March 1835 in Stockholm – 7 August 1897 in Furusund), a public official, justice and politician, and his wife Augusta Resén. Growing up in a wealthy family in the district of Östermalm, she received a comprehensive education that included language studies in England and the Netherlands as well as practical training at the Gardening school Åtvidabergs trädgårdsskola. She then took up studies at Stockholm University College (Stockholms högskola) law faculty and from 1897 to 1898 worked as assistant accountant for the Nordic Museum (Nordiska Museet).

Interested in women's education and rights issues, Åbergsson also gave private courses in the English language as well as the Föreningen studenter och arbetare (the association of Students and workers), Stockholms Borgarskola and Beskowska skola between 1896 and 1910. Her main source of income, however, was bank accounting. She worked as an office clerk for the insurance institution Ränte och Kapitalförsäkringsanstalten in Stockholm (1989–1908) and as a temporary accountant (since 1909 financial controller) for the mining company Luossavaara-Kirunavaara AB and transport company Trafik AB Grängesberg-Oxelösund before becoming a bank clerk at Enskilda banken in Stockholm, where she stayed until her retirement in 1926. She never married and did not have any children; her main interests being the support of women's rights and the promotion of allotment gardening in Sweden, for which she became an early pioneer together with her close friend Anna Lindhagen.

Anna Åbergsson died on 18 April 1937 and was buried one week later on Norra begravningsplatsen in Solna, Stockholm.

== Allotment gardening and social reform ==
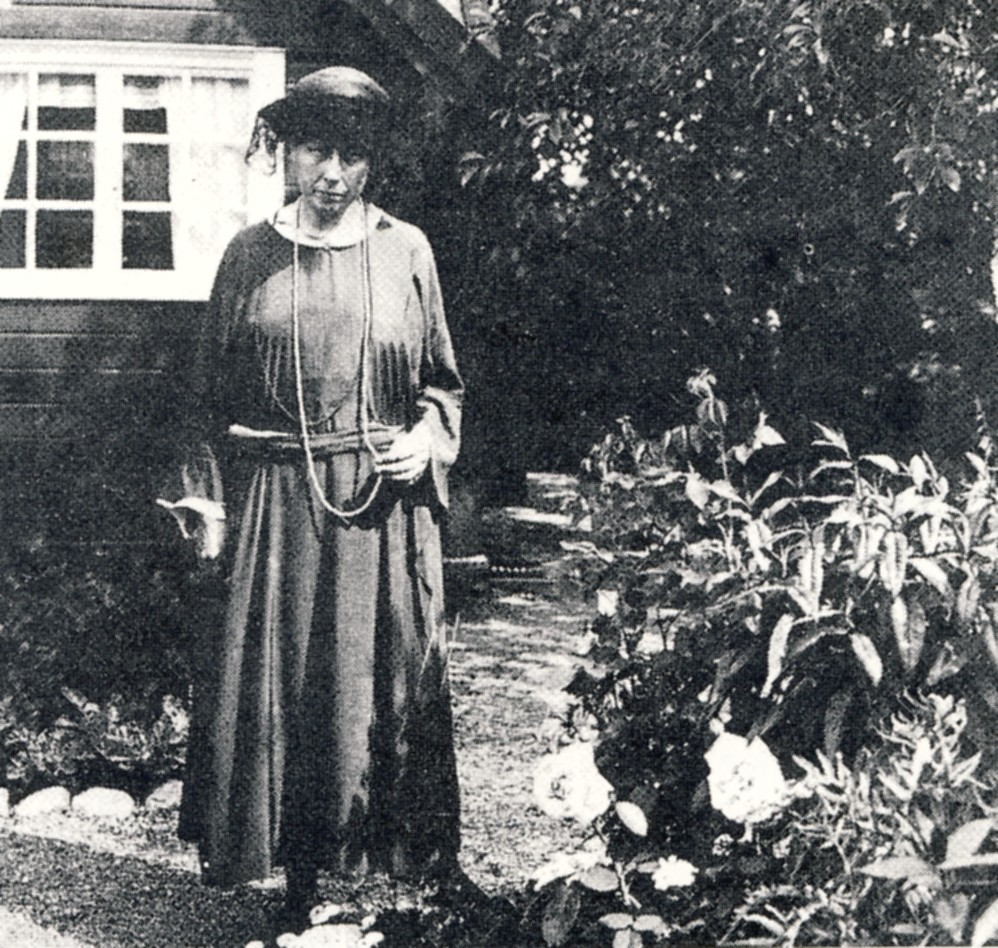
Anna Åbergsson at the allotment gardening society Bergshamra, 1920s.

Anna Åbergsson was introduced to allotment gardening through her friend, the social democratic politician and social reformer Anna Lindhagen. Lindhagen had first encountered allotment gardens in Copenhagen in 1903 and was immediately taken by the health-related benefits that the small garden compounds offered urban working-class families who at the time often suffered from squalor living conditions, a lack of fresh air and poor nutrition. In 1906 Åbergsson and Lindhagen initiated the establishment of Sweden's first association for allotment gardens, Föreningen koloniträdgårdar in Stockholm (today Föreningen Stor-Stockholms Koloniträdgårdar, FSSK); Lindhagen becoming director and Åbergsson financial accountant. When Stockholm municipality in 1921 took over the management of the garden colony, Åbergsson took over the position of director from her friend. By 1918 she had also become the accountant for Frisinnade landsföreningen (National Association of the Liberal-Minded), was secretary of Folkhushållningskommissionens koloniavdelning (the Department for Allotment Gardening of the Public Housekeeping Commission) and together with a group of fellow allotment gardeners had founded Odlingssällskapet Stockholms Omnejd (Cultivation Society Stockholm’s Region) with the gardening colony Bergshamra, for which she continued to work until her death in 1937.

One of the first allotment gardens that were established in Sweden according to the social reformist ideas that Lindhagen and Åbergsson promoted was Söderbrunns koloniområde in Norra Djurgården, Stockholm, founded in 1905. As the number of interested people grew, more colonies were opened in Barnängen (1905) and Eriksdalslunden (1906). To be fair to the applicants, the gardening societies gave out the allotments by lottery and even distributed Fruit trees. In the years that followed, allotment gardening colonies were established among others in Söderbrunn, Stocksund, Tureberg, Bällsta in Bromma, Solna (Bergshamra, Lilla Frösunda and Hagalund), as well as estates Antuna in Sollentuna and Norrby in Västerhaninge. Most of them followed the ‘classical’ model with small Cottages with kitchen and ornamental garden plots, but during the years of the First and Second World War there were even gardens purely for the cultivation of Potatoes.

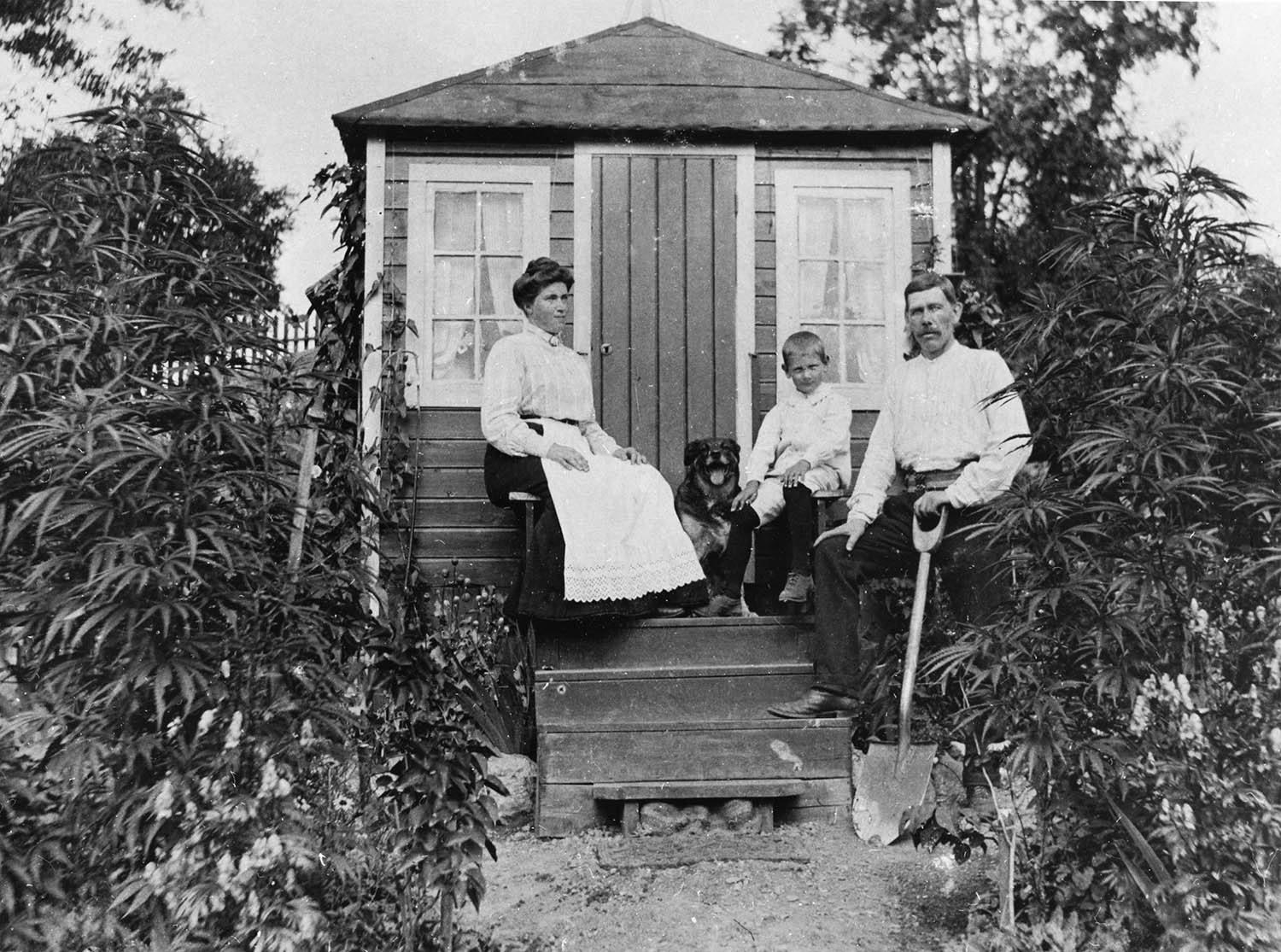
A family with dog in front of their allotment garden cottage in Eriksdalslunden, Stockholm (between 1906 and 1915).

For the financially trained Åbergsson, allotment gardens did not only provide benefits for the health and nutrition of those who cultivated them but also had economic significance as they offered working-class families and single mothers a place where they could grow their own vegetables and potatoes and invest their money long-term and with immediate, tangible benefit, thereby reducing public spending on health care and poor relief:

"Spending time in the garden is of course of extraordinary hygienic importance. It offers fresh air. The fun and healthy variety in the work that comes with gardening – whether it is done by a machinist, a clerk, a seamstress or a housewife – cannot be overestimated. Allotment gardens are valiant warriors in the fight against the two main diseases of our time – tuberculosis and overexerted nerves.” / "Vistelsen i trädgården är naturligtvis av utomordentlig hygienisk betydelse. Den erbjuder frisk luft. Den roliga och hälsosamma arbetsomväxling som medföljer trädgårdsarbetet – antingen det är från verkstadsarbetarens, kontoristens, sömmerskans eller husmoderns arbete – kan ej skattas nog högt. Koloniträdgårdar äro goda stridsmän i kampen mot våra båda tidssjukdomar – tuberkulos och överansträngda nerver."

Bergshamra in particular had been established as a kind of model allotment gardening community. Opened in 1919 by Anna Åbergsson and her younger brother, the lawyer Sven Ivar Åbergsson, it consisted of allotments of 300 to 400 square metres each, with strict rules on how to cultivate the beets and with cottages not allowed to exceed an area of 22 square metres. She once described it as "her greatest creation" and managed the community until the gardeners – or ‘colonists’ as they were called in Swedish – founded their own association, Koloniföreningen Bergshamra U.P.A. in 1931. Although she was respected as the initial founder of Bergshamra, the relationship between Åbergsson and the colonists could sometimes be tense, as the association's archives testify:

“But just as a mother in good faith admonishes her children so too ms. Åbergsson admonished her colonists, but while doing so she forgot that she was dealing with adult people, a relationship that many members did not appreciate to find themselves in. / “Men som en mor i all välmening förmanar sina barn så förmanade även fr. Åbergsson sina kolonister, men glömde därvid bort att hon hade med fullväxta personer att göra, ett förhållande som många medlemmar ej ville finna sig i.”

When allotment gardening in Stockholm came under pressure in the late 1920s and 1930s due to the city's expansion and modernization of residential areas and infrastructure, Anna Åbergsson and Anna Lindhagen were at the forefront of political protest against the pending closure of the colonies, highlighting their social importance for a large part of Stockholm's poorer urban population. In the end it was decided to keep the gardens and move some of them a bit further away from the city centre. A meeting between the two women, mayor Carl Lindhagen – who was brother to Anna Lindhagen – and the director and engineer of the city planning department Lilienberg and Dahlberg, is described in Dagens Nyheter (17 September 1928) as follows:

“Both the mayor, Miss Anna Lindhagen, Miss Åbergsson and representatives of the colonists gave the city planners a piece of their mind for how they handled their measurement scales. And the mayor even finished one of his speeches with a ‘long live the people and down with the measurement scales!’” / “Såväl borgmästaren, fröken Anna Lindhagen, fröken Åbergsson och representanter för kolonisterna gåvo stadsplaneherrarna skäppan full för deras sätt att sköta sina linjaler. Och borgmästaren slutade t.o.m. ett av sina anföranden med ett leve för människan och ett ve över linjalerna!”

Anna Åbergsson spent the last years of her life in Stockholm. When she died in 1937, she was mourned as “koloniträdgårdarnas klockarmor” – the “bell-ringer mother of allotment gardens”.

== Legacy ==
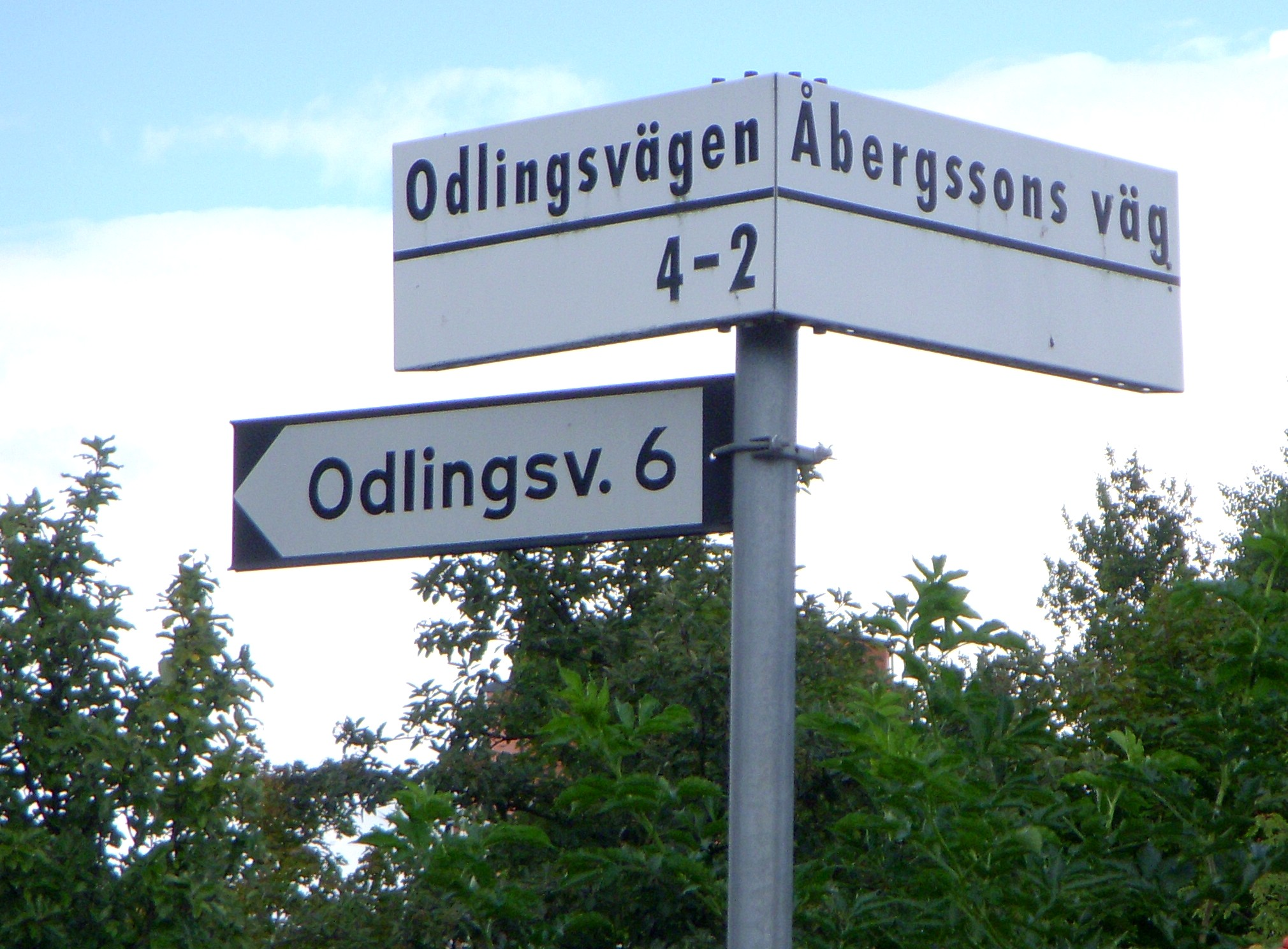
Road sign in remembrance of Anna Åbergsson in Bergshamra, 2010.

In 1986 the allotment gardening association at Eriksdalslundens koloniområde named one of their streets "Anna Åbergssons väg". Another street named "Åbergssons" can be found in the allotment garden colony Bergshamra.

A Scholarship foundation, S och A Åbergssons stipendiestiftelse, was established by testamentary order of Anna Åbergsson from 3 July 1934 to support female law students at Uppsala University "who have shown talent and interest in law, with preference to the daughters of a member of the Supreme Court". The foundation is managed by Uppsala Akademiförvaltning, the Uppsala University Foundations Management of Estates and Funds.

== Bibliography (selection) ==
Anna Åbergsson has published multiple articles on financial security for women, women's rights issues and allotment gardening. For a more detailed overview see Libris.

- Hur kvinnornas intressen tillvaratagas. Ålderdomsförsäkringskommitténs förslag [How women's interests are safeguarded. The old-age insurance committee's proposal]. Rösträtt för kvinnor 1(1912):19. pp. 1–2.
- Kvinnor i pensionsnämnderna [Women in the pension committees]. Rösträtt för kvinnor 2(1913):15. p. 2.
- Kvinnornas ställning i ålderdomsförsäkringskommitténs förslag till allmän pensionsförsäkring. Föredrag [The position of women in the old-age insurance committee's proposal for general pension insurance. Lecture]. Stockholm: Eklund, 1913.
- Kvinnornas ojämna kamp för tillvaron. Den nya pensionskassan [Women’s uneven struggle for existence. The new pension fund]. Rösträtt för kvinnor 1917(6):1 pp. 4–5.
- De svenska städernas trädgårdskolonier och möjligheten av deras inläggande i stadsplan [The allotment garden colonies of Swedish cities and the possibility of their incorporation into the city plan]. Svenska stadsförbundets tidskrift 1926(18):4. pp. 183–192.
