= GPY =

GPY may refer to:

- GPY method, another name for the Goldston–Pintz–Yıldırım sieve, technique used in number theory
- GPY Arquitectos, 2009 winner of the LEAF Award
- GPY, TSX Venture Exchange symbol for Golden Predator Mining Corp., a company on the TSX Venture 50
