= Wavefront (disambiguation) =

In physics, a wavefront is the locus (a line, or, in a wave propagating in 3 dimensions, a surface) of points having the same phase.

Wavefront may also refer to:

- Wave front set, WF(f), a mathematical set in the field of microlocal analysis that characterizes the singularities of a generalized function in space and with respect to its Fourier transform at each point
- Wavefront arbiter, a circuit used to make decisions which control the crossbar of a high capacity switch fabric in parallel.
- Wavefront coding, a method for increasing the depth of field in an image to produce sharper images
- Wavefront Technologies, a computer graphics company that developed and sold animation software used in Hollywood motion pictures and other industries
  - Wavefront .obj file A 3D mesh format
- Wavefront Technology Solutions Inc., an improved injection company for the petroleum and environmental sectors
