= Noko (disambiguation) =

Noko may refer to:

== People ==
- Noko (born 1962), English multi-instrumentalist musician, composer and producer
- Noko Matlou (born 1985), South African women's footballer
- Ishmael Noko (born 1943), southern African Lutheran priest who was the General Secretary of the Lutheran World Federation
- Noko, stage name of Ryōsuke Ōshima, lead vocalist for Shinsei Kamattechan

== Other uses ==
- Noko Jeans, a fashion company that import jeans from North Korea
- Noko Shikanoko, nicknamed "Noko-tan", main character of My Deer Friend Nokotan
- North Korea, a sovereign state in Asia
