= Korean Ocean Shipping Agency =

State-owned North Korean shipping agency

- Chosŏn'gŭl: 조선외국선박사업회사
- Hancha: 朝鮮外國船舶事業會社
- Revised Romanization: Joseon oeguk seonbak saeop hoesa
- McCune–Reischauer: Chosŏn oeguk sŏnbak saŏp hoesa

The Korean Ocean Shipping Agency (Korean: 조선외국선박사업회사) is a state-owned North Korean shipping agency. It handles all business relating to incoming foreign ships, such as pilotage, logistics and food/water supply. It was founded in 1956 and joined the Baltic and International Maritime Council (BIMCO) in 1980.

== See also ==
- List of companies of North Korea
