= Synthetic-aperture sonar =

Form of sonar using post-processing of sonar data

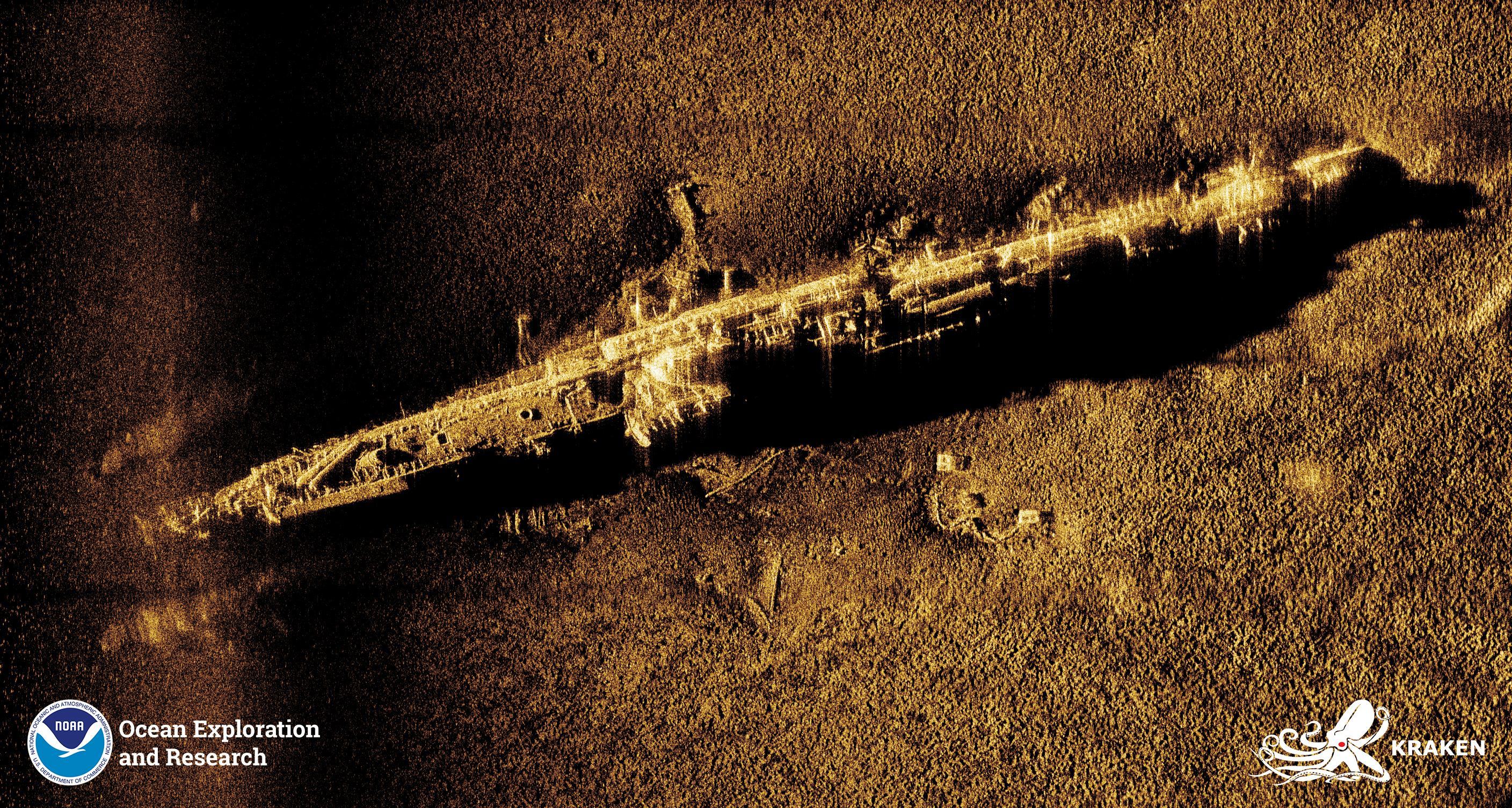
Synthetic aperture sonar imagery of the German submarine U-853

Synthetic-aperture sonar (SAS) is a form of sonar in which sophisticated post-processing of sonar data is used in ways closely analogous to synthetic-aperture radar.

Synthetic-aperture sonars combine a number of acoustic pings to form an image with much higher along-track resolution than conventional sonars. The along-track resolution can approach half the length of one sonar element, though is downward limited by 1/4 wavelength.

The principle of synthetic-aperture sonar is to move the sonar while illuminating the same spot on the sea floor with several pings. When moving along a straight line, those pings that have the image position within the beamwidth constitute the synthetic array. By coherent reorganization of the data from all the pings, a synthetic-aperture image is produced with improved along-track resolution. In contrast to conventional side-scan sonar (SSS), SAS processing provides range-independent along-track resolution. At maximum range the resolution can be magnitudes better than that of side-scan sonars.

A 2013 technology review with examples and future trends is also available. For academics, the IEEE Journal of Oceanic Engineering article: Synthetic Aperture Sonar, A Review of Current Status gives an overview of the history and an extensive list of references for the community achievements up to 2009.

The length of the synthetic aperture is

$L_{sa} \approx R \eta \frac{ \lambda }{ d }$

Where R is the range, $\lambda$ is the wavelength at center frequency and d is the along-track element size in the array. $\eta$ is a programmable parameter which controls the process beamwidth—the beamwidth actually processed.

== Challenges ==
The SAS system relies on a stable sensor platform, being able to determine to a high accuracy where the sensors are over several meters of travel distance—all the pings captured will be used in the formation of a synthetic aperture. Due to currents, heave or sway, a sensor platform may undergo lateral movement known as "crabbing", which have the potential to heavily impact SAS image formation. SAS arrays may not be the best choice for a sensor platform in rough terrain nor areas where one can expect currents from the sides. Mission planning and selection of sensor platform can alleviate some of these challenges.

When operating a SAS system in shallow waters, multiple reflections may come back to the sensor from the sea surface, impacting the quality of the data. This also depends on the seafloor conditions, sound velocity profile as well as how rough the sea surface is. One way to alleviate this issue is to angle the beams up slightly—to reduce reflections from the nearest bottom.

== Comparison between SSS and SAS ==
Traditional side scan sonars (SSS) have along-track resolution, along-track sampling and range closely coupled. This means that the maximum range and resolution depends primarily on the transmit frequency. A higher transmit frequency gives increased along-track resolution but reduced range. Synthetic-aperture sonars (SAS) on the other hand, limited by cost and complexity, allow free selection of these parameters, providing the potential for long range as well as high resolution.

=== Along-track resolution ===
Along-track resolution $\delta_x$ in a traditional side-scan sonar will deteriorate with range in the far field, an object will be imaged with a higher resolution when closer to the sensor, and less when further away.

Along-track resolution $\delta_x$ is constant at all ranges for a synthetic-aperture sonar system, this means an object should be equally visible at most ranges from the sensor.

$\delta_x = \frac{R\lambda}{L}$

Where $R$ is the range to target, $L$ is the array length, and $\lambda$ is the acoustic wavelength, a function of frequency. This means that a traditional side-scan sonar with high along-track resolution will require a very long array length for a distant target. Attenuation of the acoustic energy as frequency is increased and wavelength thus decreased, reduces the effective range.

A synthetic-aperture sonar creates a synthetic array of a long length, moving preferably in a straight line, providing a theoretical along-track resolution of a few centimeters. In practice, resolution will be somewhat worse, but still much better than an equivalent sized traditional side-scan sonar.

=== Across-track resolution ===
The across-track (range) resolution $\delta_y$ of a SAS, with a broadband FM signal, is given by:

$\delta_y = \frac{C}{2B}$

Where $C\approx1500 ms^{ - 1}$ is the speed of sound in water and $B$ is the bandwidth of the transmitted pulse.

=== Range ===
The range of a synthetic-aperture sonar depends on the transmission loss of an acoustic ping as well as the number of elements in the array and the speed of the sensor platform. Transmit frequency is one of the primary factors, and maximum imaging ranges are commonly from 100 meters (220–280 kHz) for HiSAS 2040 up to and beyond 300 meters (60–120 kHz) for HiSAS 1030 in commercially available sonars, depending on configuration. The synthetic-aperture sonars as installed on an Autonomous underwater vehicle or Towed array sonar do commonly have a Nadir gap, as is also the case in traditional side-scan sonars, where no data is available. The size of this gap depends on the lower beam angle. In very shallow waters, multipath is another limiting factor for the range of both SSS and SAS; this effect can be reduced by carefully shaping the transmit beam pattern to avoid bouncing off pings of the surface.

With frequency sufficiently low to allow reception from maximum range, the ground range is determined by receiver array length and platform speed v:

$R=\frac{cD\cos{ \varphi }}{ 4v \alpha }$

Where $\alpha \geq 1$ is an overlap factor chosen to allow for ping to ping cross-correlation, $\varphi$ is depression angle at maximum range.

=== Post-processing ===
Traditional sidescan-sonar is normally available immediately after capturing without any further processing needed, while synthetic-aperture sonars depend on complex post-processing done on powerful computers, increasing the time from data capture to analysis. Some systems allow real-time processing at a reduced resolution, which allows for in-situ mission updates based on observations, as well as providing a machine learning platform for object classification. This also means that data storage rates needed for SAS are profound, from 60 to 90 GB per hour of raw data is common.

=== Area coverage ===
Area coverage is one of the most important factors in commercial applications of hydro-acoustics. For both SSS and SAS systems, the instantaneous area coverage $IACR$ for a two-sided system (i.e. both port and starboard sensor) is:

$IACR=2 (R-r) v$

Where $R$ is the max ground range and $r$ is the shortest ground range before the Nadir gap, and $v$ is the speed of the sonar. The actual area coverage is somewhat less than this.

Area coverage with a traditional side-scan sonar depends on range and at what range the resolution gets too low for the target goal of the scan. Area coverage with a synthetic-aperture sonar, with an across-track resolution that is constant all the way until the end of the range, is practically closer to the instantaneous area coverage.

== Military applications ==
Synthetic-aperture sonar deployed from autonomous underwater vehicles has proven useful for detecting unexploded ordnance as well as naval mines.

== Civilian applications ==
Synthetic-aperture sonar deployed from autonomous underwater vehicles has been used to find sunken ships and debris. It was among several sensor types used in the search for Malaysia Airlines Flight 370.

This type of sonar is also starting to see use in ocean research. NOAA, Kraken Robotics and ThayerMahan conducted a joint technology demonstration in 2019, where synthetic-aperture sonar was one of the technologies demonstrated.

Detection of carbon dioxide gas seeps has been using synthetic-aperture sonar coupled with advanced signal processing has been proven possible, and is an ongoing research topic.

Hunting for lost fishing gear, pots and nets has been done using synthetic-aperture sonar on an AUV in Norway.

== See also ==
- Beamforming
- Phased array
