= Pyongyang Ostrich Farm =

Ostrich farm in North Korea

Coordinates: 39.1740°N 125.7295°E

- Native name: 평양타조목장
- Type: State-owned enterprise
- Industry: Agriculture, livestock
- Founded: 1998
- Founder: Kim Jong Il (proposed)
- Headquarters: Sunan-guyok, Pyongyang, North Korea
- Area served: North Korea
- Products: Ostrich meat, eggs, leather goods
- Owner: Government of North Korea

The Pyongyang Ostrich Farm (Korean: 평양타조목장) is a state-run ostrich farm and tourist facility located in Sunan-guyok, Pyongyang, the capital of North Korea. The farm is located about six kilometers southeast of Pyongyang Sunan International Airport. The farm is known for breeding ostriches for meat, eggs, and leather. It has also been promoted domestically as a site of scientific innovation and economic self-sufficiency.

== History ==
The farm was reportedly personally proposed by Kim Jong Il in November 1997 during the 1990s North Korean famine. He ordered officials to raise ostriches since ostriches consume little feed while producing a large amount of meat, leather, and feathers. Another reason was that ostrich meat was a good source of protein and its leather can be used to make goods.

The farm was established to diversify its agricultural production. 560,000 trees were planted in the bare land, where the farm would be built. Ostriches were brought from Africa during the winter, which led to North Koreans making vests for the ostriches to wear to protect them from the harsh winter. Each ostrich cost $10,000. Equipment such as $1.2 million dismembering machine and sausage maker were imported from France and Italy. 110 ostrich houses were built to house the ostriches.

The farm was completed and was opened on September 3rd, 1998 to commemorate the 50th anniversary of the founding of the DPRK. In 2019, the Pyongyang Ostrich Farm was renovated and upgraded. A ceremony was held in August to commemorate the end of the revamp.

in 2020, 80 female ostriches died in mid-May. A team of 10 veterinary disease experts was sent to investigate the deaths and prevent the spread of the disease. The exact cause of what led to the deaths is still unknown. The Ministry of State Security officials ordered the farm employees to prevent any leaks about the incident, and the Central Committee has reportedly ordered that all efforts must be taken to avoid the spread of the disease.

In 2022, there was an outbreak of avian flu (bird flu) in Pyongyang Ostrich Farm and in a chicken farm in Anju, South Pyongan Province.

== Overview ==
There are 10,000 ostriches grouped in pens that lines a long road. It is known as the "Ostrich Alley".

Tourists can visit the farm. Visitors can observe ostriches in enclosures and can learn about the breeding practices. It cost €2 per person as entry fee and €1 per person to ride the electric vehicle. Visitors can ride an ostrich drawn cart which costs €2 per person per ride.

There is a small shop from where visitors can purchase ostrich products like sausages, high heels, men's loafers, wallets, purses, feather dusters and painted eggs on carved wooden stands.

== See also ==
- Pyongyang Chewing Gum Factory
- Taedonggang Brewing Company
- Pyongyang Wheat Flour Processing Factory
