= Albert Lindhagen =

Swedish city planner, lawyer and politician

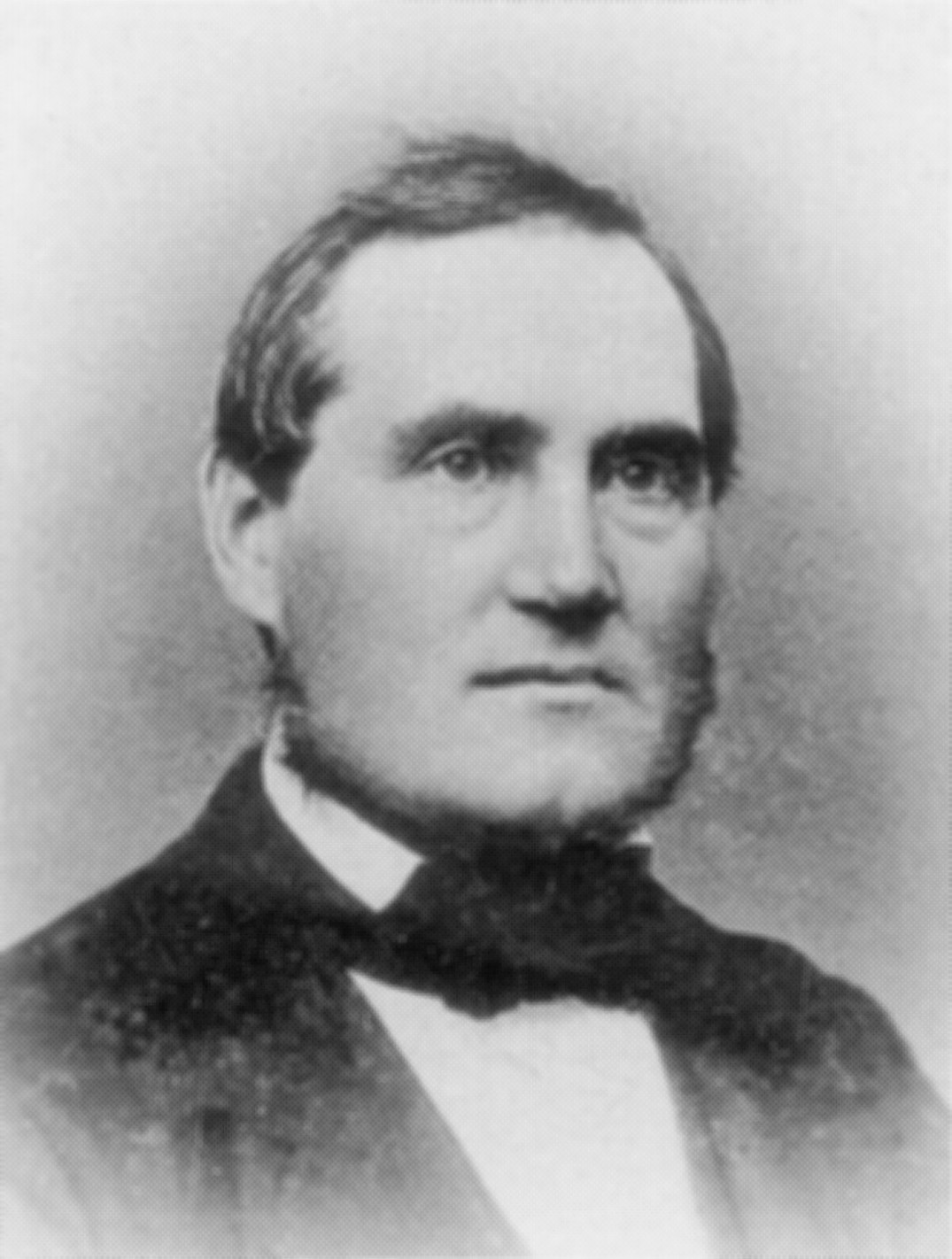
Lindhagen in the 1880s

Klas Albert Lindhagen (July 25, 1823 – October 21, 1887) was a Swedish city planner, lawyer, and politician. He is mostly remembered for his city plans for Stockholm produced in the late 19th century.

== Biography ==
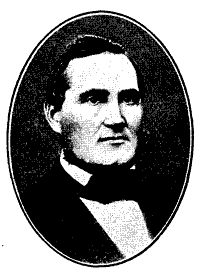
Albert Lindhagen

Lindhagen studied at Uppsala from 1841, received a Ph.D. in 1848, and graduated in 1849. He worked at the Svea Court of Appeal from 1854, at the Ministry for Civil Service Affairs from 1864, the Office of the Minister for Justice (Justitiestatsexpeditionen) from 1869, was member of the Legislation Committee (Lagbyrån) from 1871, and Justice of the Supreme Court 1874–1886.

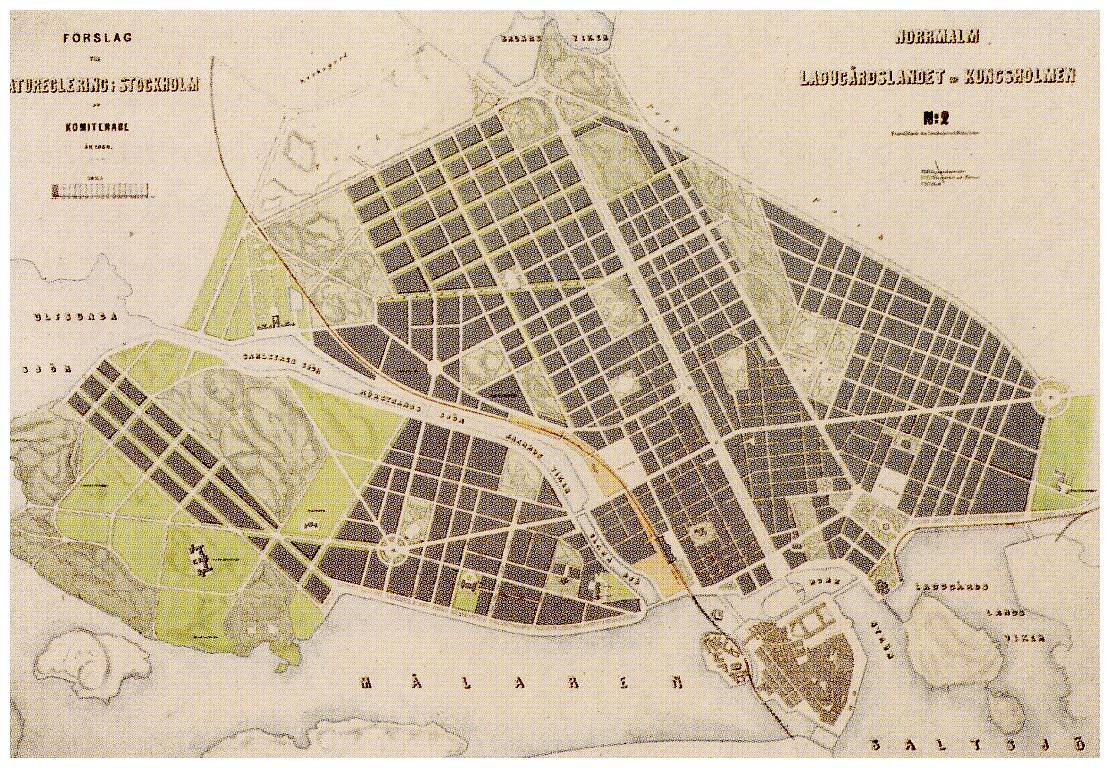
Lindhagen's 1886 city plan for northern central Stockholm.

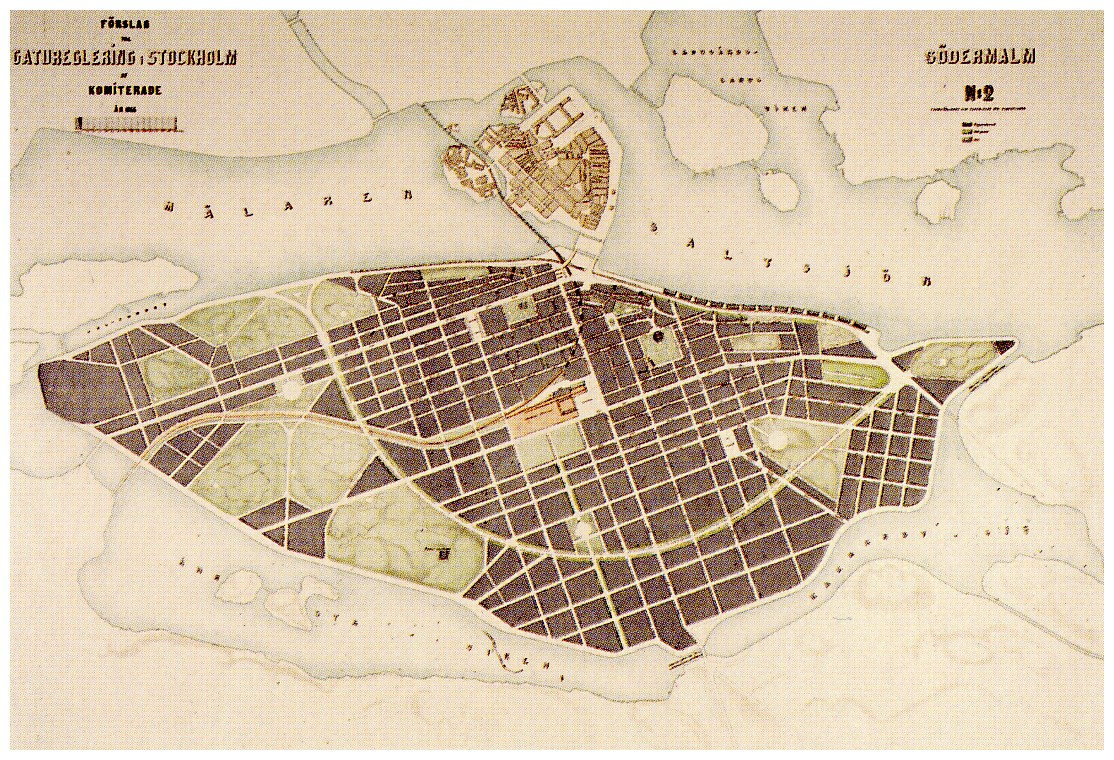
Lindhagen's 1886 city plan for southern central Stockholm.

He made important contributions to the health, fire safety, and construction charters of 1868 and 1874. He was member of the board of Stockholm's folk schools (folkskola) 1862–79 and from 1863 member of the Stockholm Municipal Assembly. As such, he had a lasting impact on the redevelopment of Stockholm's city plans and sanitary conditions, and was a leading force behind the reorganisation of the Stockholm University.

In 1869, he was elected member of the second chamber of the Riksdag, and in 1883 member of the first chamber.

Albert Lindhagen was the father of Carl Lindhagen, Anna Lindhagen, and Arthur Lindhagen.
