= Sunan-guyok =

District of Pyongyang, North Korea

Sunan-guyŏk 순안구역
- Guyŏk of Pyongyang

Korean transcription(s)
  - Hanja: 順安區域
  - McCune-Reischauer: Sunan-guyŏk
  - Revised Romanization: Sunanguyeok
- Location of Sunan-guyok within Pyongyang
- Coordinates: 39°12′10″N 125°42′20″E
- Country: North Korea
- Direct-administered city: P'yŏngyang-Chikhalsi

Area
  - Total: 141.2 km^{2} (54.5 sq mi)

Population (2008)
  - Total: 91,791
  - Density: 650.1/km^{2} (1,684/sq mi)

- Sunan-guyok
- Hangul: 순안구역
- Hanja: 順安區域
- Revised Romanization: Sunanguyeok
- McCune–Reischauer: Sunan-guyŏk

Sunan-guyŏk, or Sunan District is one of the 19 guyok which constitute the city of Pyongyang, North Korea.

Pyongyang Sunan International Airport and Pyongyang Ostrich Farm are in the district.

Air Koryo is headquartered in Sunan District.

== Administrative divisions ==
Sunan-guyŏk is divided into 5 dong (neighbourhoods) and 9 ri (villages):

- Namsan-dong 남산동 (南山洞)
- Sinsŏng-dong 신성동 (新成洞)
- Sŏkpak-dong 석박동 (石博洞)
- Taeyang-dong 대양동 (大陽洞)
- Yŏkchŏn-dong 역전동 (驛前洞)
- Anhŭng-ri 안흥리 (安興里)
- Chaegyŏng-ri 재경리 (在京里)
- Ch'ŏndong-ri 천동리 (川東里)
- Kusŏ-ri 구서리 (九瑞里)
- Osan-li 오산리 (梧山里)
- Ryongbung-ri 룡복리 (龍伏里)
- San'yang-ri 산양리 (山陽里)
- Tongsal-ri 동산리 (東山里)
- T'aeg'am-ri 택암리 (宅庵里)
