= Cooljarloo, Western Australia =

Cooljarloo
- Town
- Interactive map of Cooljarloo
- Coordinates: 30°39′S 115°22′E
- Country: Australia
- State: Western Australia
- LGA: Shire of Dandaragan

Area
  - Total: 672.2 km^{2} (259.5 sq mi)

Population
  - Total: 13 (SAL 2021)

Cooljarloo, also known as Cooljarloo Well, is a location in Western Australia. It is located at 30°39'S 115°22'E, around 170 kilometres north of Perth, and about ten kilometres north of Cataby. It is best known as the location of a major mineral sands deposit, mined by the Tronox, previously Tiwest Joint Venture.
