= Ryonbong =

North Korean corporation

- Hangul: 조선련봉총회사
- Hanja: 朝鮮連峰總會社
- RR: Joseon ryeonbong chong hoesa
- MR: Chosŏn ryŏnbong ch'ong hoesa

Ryonbong General Corp. (also known as Korea Ryonbong General Corporation, or Korea Yonbong General Corporation, or Lyongaksan General Trading Corporation (룡각산총무역회사)) is a North Korean government-owned corporation involved in the export of metals, minerals and machines. It has branch offices in many countries. It used to partially-own the Pyonghwa Motors car factory in Nampo in a joint venture with the Unification Church of South Korea before Pyonghwa becoming a part of the North Korean state.

== Sanctions ==
The Ryonbong general Corp. is part of a UN weapon embargo since November 2006.

== See also ==
- List of North Korean companies
- Economy of North Korea
- Korea Pugang Corporation
