= Coloured Ties Capital =

Coloured Ties Capital Inc.
- Formerly: Americas Petrogas
- Company type: Public
- Traded as: TSX-V: C.TIE
- Industry: Mining
- Headquarters: Vancouver, British Columbia, Canada
- Products: Potash
- Website: www.colouredtiescapital.com

Coloured Ties Capital Inc., formerly known as GrowMax Resources, is a Canadian mining and speciality chemicals and minerals company.

The company adopted its current name in November 2021.

== Subsidiaries ==
GrowMax Agri Corp is a subsidiary of Growmax Resources (formerly Americas Petrogas), a Canadian-based natural resource company. Americas Petrogas owns 80% of GrowMax, the remaining 20% are owned by the Indian Farmers Fertiliser Cooperative Limited (IFFCO). GrowMax is in the process of developing a potash fertilizer plant in the Bayovar area of Northern Peru, where it plans on producing various types of fertilizers and specialty minerals. Management has forecast production start-up by 2012.

== Concession ==
GrowMax has the surface rights and access to a 202,600 acre (82,000 hectare) concession situated in the Sechura Desert of Peru. GrowMax acquired the rights to the concession from the Peruvian government and entered into an agreement with the local community for the right of surface access for 33 years, it has the option to extend this contract to 100 years. The concession is immediately adjacent to Vale's phosphate development, which is scheduled to start production in the second half of 2010.

The concession is located six degrees south of the equator, in one of the world's driest areas. The climate there allows for the recovery of potash and other minerals from brine using solar pond evaporation technology; this was proven by a pilot plant constructed on the concession in the 1960s. Solar evaporation has both a shorter set up time as well as a lower capital expenditure cost, than conventional and solution mining. GrowMax has the immediate objective of building a plant capable of producing 250,000 tons of potash fertilizer a year, and plans on eventually expanding the capacity to 500,000 tons per year.

The Bayovar project is surrounded by existing infrastructure. The Interoceanic Highway connects the concession to Brazil, Chile and Bolivia; while the Pan-American Highway links the concession to Colombia, Panama and North America – including Alaska. There are two deep sea ports in close proximity of the concession – Port of Bayovar and Port of Paita. The Port of Paita is the second largest container port in Peru. Both the Port of Bayovar and the Piura Airport are located approximately 60 kilometers from the centre of the project.

== History ==
The concession was initially explored by Texada Mines and was later acquired by Kaiser Chemical in the 1960s. Kaiser performed a detailed analysis of the site; which included mapping, surface and subsurface testing, core drilling of reservoirs, testing of experimental supply ditches, pump testing of wells, experimental pond construction, metallurgical and chemical studies, and laboratory simulation of solar evaporation. Kaiser constructed a pilot plant on the concession, where it was successful at producing high quality potash – both potassium chloride (99% pure KCl) and potassium sulphate (K_{2}SO_{4}).

GrowMax has retained the services of Luis Coronel and Vicente Palacio, two chemical engineers who worked on the concession with Kaiser Chemical. Luis Coronel is the president of LAC Business Group, a solar evaporation technology consulting firm. He has over 40 years of experience in the analysis, planning, design, engineering, project management, and implementation of solar evaporation technology for processing of brines for producing potash, salt, and chemical by-products.

== Indian Farmers Fertiliser Cooperative ==
With over 50 million members, IFFCO is the largest farmers cooperative in the world. Its annual output of more than 7 million tonnes, makes it the largest producer of fertilizer in India. It has assets worth more than $10 billion.

In February 2010, America's Petrogas issued a press release announcing that GrowMax had entered into a joint venture partnership with IFFCO. IFFCO owns 20% of GrowMax and has representation on its board. IFFCO plans on purchasing 50% of the annual potash output from the Bayovar site.

== Potash and specialty chemicals ==
GrowMax plans on producing various types of fertilizers and specialty chemicals. It has identified the following mineral potentials:

- Potassium chloride
- Potassium sulphate
- Magnesium chloride
- Calcium sulphate
- Sulphate
- Sodium chloride
- Bromine
- Phosphate
- Diatomite
- Lithium
- Nitrates
