= Anna Lindhagen =

Swedish politician, social reformer and women's rights activist

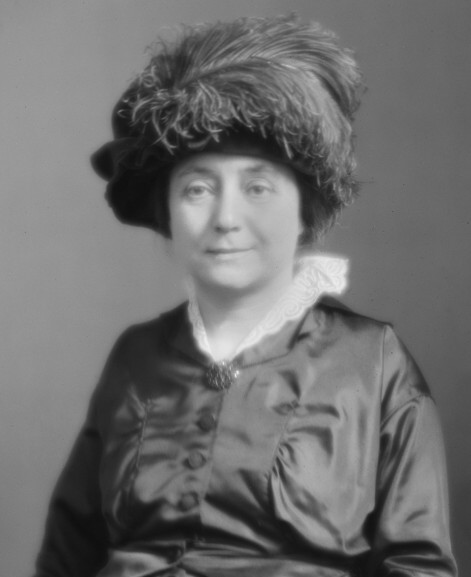
- Born: Anna Jakobina Johanna Lindhagen; 7 April 1870; Stockholm, Sweden
- Died: 15 May 1941 (aged 71); Stockholm, Sweden
- Occupations: Politician, Suffragist

Anna Jakobina Johanna Lindhagen (7 April 1870 – 15 May 1941) was a Swedish politician (Social Democrat), social reformer and women's rights activist. In collaboration with Anna Åbergsson, she was a leading force in the introduction of allotment in Sweden. She was one of the driving forces behind the foundation of the National Association for Women's Suffrage. Lindhagen was a member of the Stockholm City Council in 1911–1923.

== Life ==
Anna Lindhagen was the daughter of Albert Lindhagen and the sister of Carl Lindhagen and Arthur Lindhagen. She was a licensed nurse and an activist within the Labour movement: from 1902 until 1925, she worked as a child care inspector for the Stockholm Poor care. In 1902, Lindhagen was one of the leading figures who called for the formation of a women's organisation for women suffrage, which was founded as the Swedish Society for Woman Suffrage. With her combined membership in the upper-classes and her social democratic and radically socialistic views, she functioned as a uniting force between right wing and left wing women within the suffrage union. From 1911 until 1916, she was the editor of Morgonbris, the paper on the social democratic women.

In 1906, Anna Lindberg and Anna Åbergsson founded the Föreningen koloniträdgårdar i Stockholm (The Society of the Stockholm Allotment), the first allotment society in Stockholm.

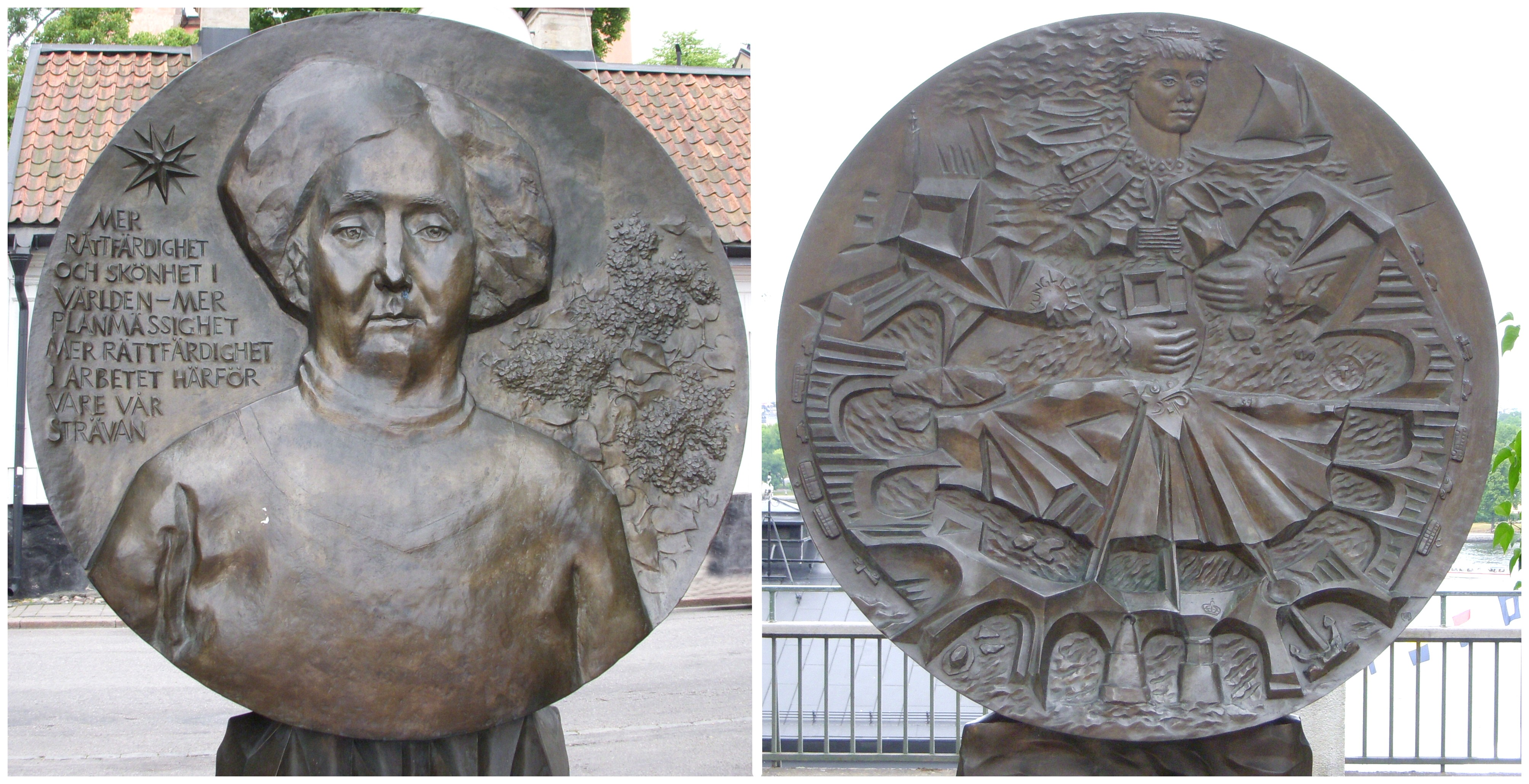
Sculpture of Anna Lindhagen by Kerstin Kjellberg-Jacobsson at Fjällgatan in Stockholm.

== Legacy ==
At Fjällgatan in Stockholm, there is a museum called Borgarrummen (The Bourgeoisie Rooms) depicting a merchant class home from the mid-19th century, furnished by Anna Lindhagen and where she herself lived prior to her death. Close by, there is a small park, Anna Lindhagens täppa, named after her. At Fjällagatan not long from there, there is also a sculpture of Anna Lindhagen.

== Sources ==
- Ur Stockholmsliv II, Staffan Tjerneld, 1950
- CD:n Söder i våra hjärtan, Topsy Bondesson
- Barbro Hedvall (2011). Susanna Eriksson Lundqvist. red. Vår rättmätiga plats. Om kvinnornas kamp för rösträtt.. Förlag Bonnier. ISBN 978-91-7424-119-8
