= Korea Sinhung Trading =

Trading company in Pyongyang, North Korea

- Chosŏn'gŭl: 조선신흥무역총회사
- Hancha: 朝鮮新興貿易總會社
- Revised Romanization: Joseon sinheung muyeok chonghoesa
- McCune–Reischauer: Chosŏn sinhŭng muyŏk ch'onghoesa

Korea Sinhung Trading Corporation (Korean: 조선신흥무역총회사) is a trading company in Pyongyang, North Korea. It is involved in seafood export and is also involved in the import of household appliances and furniture. The company registered the trademark "chotnun" (첫눈, 'first snow') at the World Intellectual Property Organization in 2019.

== Names ==
Old Korean names were Choson sinhungmuyok sangsa (Korean: 조선신흥무역상사; Hanja: 朝鮮新興貿易商社; name in the early 2000s), Choson sinhung muyok hoesa (조선신흥무역회사; 朝鮮新興貿易會社), and many others.

== Leadership ==
The company was led by Om Kyong Chol or Om Kwang Chol in the early 2010s, who is part of the North Korean secret police.

== Address ==
Tongan-dong Chung-guyok, Pyongyang.

== See also ==
- List of North Korean companies
- Economy of North Korea
