= Astra Resources =

Astra Resources, PTY, LTD
- Industry: Mining
- Headquarters: Adelaide, Australia
- Key people: Jaydeep Biswas (CEO), Silvana De Cianni (managing director)
- Products: Coal, iron ore, gold

Astra Resources plc (FWB:9AR) is a UK-based mining company, the parent of Astra Mining, a producer of raw materials related to the steel industry, including iron ore, coal, gold and other materials.

== T-Steel ==
The firm's largest asset is its 45% share in the intellectual property of T-Steel. The basic product is a combination of highly specialized processes and alloying technologies invented over 30 years ago in Hungary. The technology is based on the modification of the metallurgical properties of steel at a molecular level. The result is a product that Astra claims is stronger, less expensive, and uses less raw materials to make than conventional steel. As of February 2011, Astra Resources's 45% IP stake in the T-Steel technology was reported to be worth $2.01 billion euros.
