= Korea General Chemicals Trading =

North Korean chemical conglomerate

Korea General Chemicals Trading Corporation (Korean: 조선화학무역총회사) is a North Korean chemical conglomerate. Its headquarters are in Pyongyang. Including plastic, it produces a wide variety of chemicals for domestic commercial and industrial use. The company also imports chemicals into North Korea.

== Products ==
Products of Korea General Chemicals include liquified gas, urea fertilizer, ammonium nitrate fertilizer, explosives, blasting fuses, percussion caps, potassium nitrate, sodium nitrate, rubber, rubber asbestos packing materials, aluminum silicon, plastics, alcohols, inks, carbides, dyes, chrome yellow, potassium alum and aluminium hydroxide.

=== Imported products ===
The company imports industrial chemical stock including caustic soda, potassium carbonate, normal hexane, chromic anhydride, zinc dusting powder, titanium white, other pigments, glycerine, seamless steel pipes, high alumina cement, nickel, silver, and various ingredients for the production of plastic.
