= Tiwest Joint Venture =

Former mining company in Western Australia

- Industry: Mining
- Founded: 1988; 38 years ago
- Defunct: June 2012
- Fate: Operations absorbed by Tronox
- Headquarters: Bentley, Western Australia, Australia
- Owners: Tronox Western Australia Pty Ltd; Subsidiaries of Exxaro Australia Sands Pty Ltd.
- Website: tiwest.com.au

The Tiwest Joint Venture was a joint venture between Tronox Western Australia Pty Ltd and subsidiaries of Exxaro Australia Sands Pty Ltd. The Tiwest Joint Venture was a mining and processing company, established in 1988, to extract ilmenite, rutile, leucoxene and zircon from a mineral sands deposit at Cooljarloo, 14 km north of Cataby, Western Australia. As of June 2012, the joint venture was formally dissolved, when Tronox acquired the mineral-sands-related divisions of Exxaro outright.

Tiwest's corporate office (sales/marketing/accounting/administration/IT/etc) was located in Bentley, five minutes drive south of the Perth central business district. During the joint-venture phase of operations, from 1988 through 2012, heavy mineral concentrate was trucked from Cooljarloo, 1 hour and 15 minutes south to the Chandala mineral sands processing plant, near Muchea, 70 km north of Perth. The concentrate was then separated in a facility known as a dry mill, using a magnetic separation-process. Ilmenite was further processed on-site into synthetic rutile, which is used by pigment plants to manufacture paints and similar products. Additional minerals, produced as a byproduct of the rutile production process, were sold as-is. Most synthetic rutile from Chandala was then trucked to Kwinana, 30 km south of Perth, to the Tiwest-owned pigment plant, which produces titanium dioxide a.k.a. TiO_{2}. A $100M upgrade to this Kwinana pigment plant was approved by the boards of both Tronox and Exxaro, and was expected to increase TiO_{2} pigment production by up to 50% before 2013. TiO_{2} is the best commercially viable whiting agent known, and is typically used in the manufacture of paints, plastics, and food stuffs.

As part of the 2012 acquisition, the assets of the TIWEST Joint Venture have been folded into the sole parent company, Tronox, which continues to operate in the mineral-sands industry.
