= Korea Ponghwa General =

North Korean industrial company

Korea Ponghwa General Corporation (Chosongul: 조선봉화 총회사) is an industrial group headquartered in Pyongyang, North Korea.

== Products ==
Ponghwa produces knitwear, business suits, underwear, shoes, nylon rucksacks and bags, winter coats, skiwear, sportswear, golf bags, and hockey bags. The company is involved in Korea's eelskin garment and accessory industry. Ponghwa also produces embroidery. It produces much of its own packaging material at a polystyrene plastics facility.

The company owns non-ferrous metals processing facilities, fisheries, and produces mushrooms and vegetables such as broad bellflower and aralia.

The company imports sport fishing equipment, packing materials and high-pressure polyethylene. It owns restaurants and shops.

== Factories ==
- Changgwang Export Clothing Factory(창광수출피복공장)
- Okryu Export Clothing Factory(옥류수출피복공장)
- Munsu Export Clothing Factory(문수수출피복공장)
- Ragwon Export Clothing Factory(락원수출피복공장)
- Mangyongdae Export Clothing Factory(만경대수출피복공장)
- Nampho Light Industry Factory(남포경공업공장)
- Pyongyang Chewing Gum Factory
