= Korea General Zinc Industry Group =

North Korean mining and industrial group

- Chosŏn'gŭl: 조선아연공업총회사
- Hancha: 朝鮮亞鉛工業總會社
- Revised Romanization: Joseon ayeon gongeop chong hoesa
- McCune–Reischauer: Chosŏn ayŏn kongŏp ch'ong hoesa

Korea General Zinc Industry Group (Korean: 조선아연공업총회사) is a North Korean mining and industrial group headquartered in Pyongyang founded in the year 2000. The group produces zinc, lead, base bullion, lead concentrates, zinc concentrates, cadmium, arsenic, zinc residues and copper concentrate for export and domestic use. The group imports some industrial and mining accessories, including industrial chemical reagents and animal feed.

== See also ==
- List of North Korean companies
- Economy of North Korea
