= Pyongyang Chewing Gum Factory =

North Korean chewing gum factory

- Built: 2003; 23 years ago
- Location: Rangnang District, Pyongyang, DPR Korea; Pyongyang, North Korea
- Coordinates: 38°58′14″N 125°42′41″E
- Industry: Food manufacturing
- Products: Chewing gum
- Area: 11,900 square metres (128,000 sq ft)
- Owner: Korea Ponghwa General

- Pyongyang Chewing Gum Factory
- Hangul: 평양 껌 공장
- Hanja: 平壤 껌 工場
- RR: Pyeongyang kkeom gongjang
- MR: P'yŏngyang kkŏm kongjang

The Pyongyang Chewing Gum Factory is a factory that manufactures chewing gum in Pyongyang, North Korea. The plant is run by Korea Ponghwa General.

== History ==
The Pyongyang Gum Factory began operations in October 2003 in a 4,400 square metres (47,000 sq ft) floor area facility located on a 11,900 square metres (128,000 sq ft) plot of land in Rakrang-guyok. Its annual production capacity was reported to be 1,200 tons. In 2008, it moved to a new location on Tong'il Street, Chung-guyok. The new building was constructed by soldiers from the Korean People's Army. Kim Jong-il made an inspection of the factory in January 2009. A picture book featuring the factory was published by Korea Pictorial in 2010.

== Menu ==
Among their products is Unbangul Chewing Gum (은방울 껌). The KCNA reports that it strengthens gums and teeth, prevents dental caries, counteracts tartar and halitosis, and promotes digestion and cerebration. Available flavours include grape, peppermint, and strawberry, in flat, round, and square shapes. There is also a lemon-flavored gum which contains vitamin c. The main ingredients of the gum are edible rubber, sugar, glycerine, flavouring, and natural food colouring.

== See also ==
- Pyongyang Ostrich Farm
