= Law Faculty of Stockholm University =

The Faculty of Law at Stockholm University commenced its activities in the autumn term of 1907 as the Department of Political and Legal Science at the University College of Stockholm, with seven professors and 81 registered students.

By the decision of the Swedish Riksdag in 1959, Stockholm University College was ordered to move to Frescati located outside the town centre. It would take over ten years, however, before the faculty could move into the six blue high-rise blocks in the early 1970s.

Today, the law faculty is the largest faculty in the country. The Department of Law has between 2500 and 4000 students every year. They either follow the undergraduate law programme or study independent law courses for non-degree purposes. The department employs over a hundred full-time teachers and researchers.

The faculty has about 30 professors specialising in traditional legal subjects, such as jurisprudence, private law, fiscal law, international law, public law, procedural law, legal history and criminal law. These scientists have further specialised knowledge of various other fields of law, such as labour law, company law, export law, real property law, insurance law, intellectual property law, marketing law, the law of damages and transportation law. In addition to that there is a special chair in European integration Law.

In total, the department employs about 155 persons, of which approximately 45 persons represent administrative and technical staff.
