= Naegohyang =

North Korean state-run conglomerate

Naegohyang (Korean: 내고향, "My Homeland") is a North Korean state-run conglomerate.

== History ==
Naegohyang began as a manufacturer of cigarettes, including the premiere brand "7.27", and diversified into other goods, including soju and electronics. The conglomerate also produces sports apparel. The company opened clothing stores in Pyongyang in 2015, including at the Mirae Scientists Street. The Naegohyang Sul soju brand began appearing around 2017.
