= Americas Petrogas =

Canadian exploration and oil production company

- Company type: Public
- Traded as: TSX-V:BOE
- Founded: 2005; 21 years ago
- Defunct: 2016; 10 years ago
- Successor: GrowMax Resources Corp.
- Headquarters: Calgary, Alberta, Canada
- Key people: Barclay Hambrook (CEO); Carlos Lau (Chairman)
- Products: Oil & Gas, Potash, Minerals
- Website: http://www.americaspetrogas.com

Americas Petrogas, Inc. was a Canadian exploration and oil production company active in Argentina's Neuquén Basin. After ending its involvement in oil in 2016, the company changed its name to GrowMax Resources Corp.

Ryder Scott Company petroleum engineers assessed the Company with 7.6 Billion BOE P50 Best Case Unrisked Prospective (Recoverable) Shale Resources (Lower Agrio, Vaca Muerta, Los Molles). Americas Petrogas was sought out by ExxonMobil and others, to partner on its shale blocks. Subsequently, Americas Petrogas entered into a joint venture with ExxonMobil on 4 of its 9 shale blocks with Americas Petrogas retaining Operatorship. Together the partners have announced 3 Vaca Muerta discoveries.

Subsidiary GrowMax Agri Corp is exploring and developing a large phosphate and potash and carnallite fertilizer project in Northern Peru's Sechura Desert adjacent to Vale's Bayovar surface phosphate mine. Vale's partners in this venture include Mitsui and Mosaic.

== History ==
In 2004, Americas Petrogas was founded by oil and gas entrepreneur Barclay Hambrook and his long-time business partner Carlos Lau. They decided to focus on the continent of South America. The business partners sought to leverage Lau's knowledge of the history, politics and business cultures of South America as well as the knowledge of hydrocarbon basins provided by a former chief geoscientist who joined their team. They also considered the fiscal regimes, the geology, and access to infrastructure to enable early asset monetization for oil and gas discoveries. At the time, Ecuador and Venezuela did not meet their risk criteria due to the political landscapes in those countries. Brazil was unattractive to them because of the tight control of the oil and gas industry under Petrobras; for example, there is a requirement to use Petrobras to transport oil and gas. In Chile, there were few oil and gas opportunities as well as a scarcity of equipment and expertise. Colombia, at the time, was experiencing serious security issues. Peru offered lands that were in jungle environments which were much too risky and costly to operate for a start up company.

Eventually, they decided on the hydrocarbon basins of Argentina. The project was initially funded privately with their own and family money. They chose the site at Neuquén Basin, where oil had been discovered over 100 years ago, as its geological setting was similar to that of Western Canada, and only a tiny fraction of wells had been drilled historically.

== Operations ==
In 2004, Barclay and Carlos began assembling a large land portfolio along with a management and operations team with the aim of creating an attractive investment opportunity, first for those investors who could appreciate the attractive risk reward scenarios and, later, for leading oil and gas companies. Americas Petrogas is now one of the largest landholders in the Neuquén Basin with almost 900,000 net acres spread over 12 large blocks, 11 of which the company operates. This includes 4 blocks with partner ExxonMobil with Americas Petrogas as the operator. Americas Petrogas has specialized in drilling and discovering unconventional shale oil and, shale gas, while undertaking conventional exploration and production in the Medanito Sur, Rinconada Norte, and Vaca Mahuida blocks. Americas Petrogas has drilled 5 Vaca Muerta shale wells, all discoveries. Testing of these wells has placed them as some of the best performing of all shale wells drilled in the Neuquen Basin to date.

In 2013, an independent Houston engineering firm, Ryder Scott, provided Americas Petrogas a Resource Report on the company's unconventional blocks. The report, updated in 2014, finds that a Net 7.6 billion barrels of oil equivalent P50 Best Case recoverable, unrisked prospective resources attributed to the Vaca Muerta, Lower Agrio and Los Molles shales was estimated on 9 western shale blocks.

The Neuquén Basin has been assessed by the U.S. Energy Information Administrator with recoverable resources from shale of 585 TCF of gas and 20 Billion barrels of oil, making Argentina the second largest gas provider globally, after China, and the fourth largest among oil providers.

As of 2014, the Buenos Aires offices of Americas Petrogas Argentina employed almost 35 people and 15 field personnel (representing a total 800 combined years oil and gas experience), many of whom worked together in the past under Chauvco Resources Argentina and Pioneer Natural Resources (Argentina). Most have also worked for American and Canadian companies and many have worked abroad.
