= Bard Ventures =

Defunct Canadian Mining and Exploration Company

Bard Ventures Ltd.
- Formerly: Consolidated Bard Silver & Gold Ltd.
- Company type: Public
- Traded as: TSX-V: CBS
- Industry: Mining
- Headquarters: Vancouver, British Columbia, Canada

Bard Ventures Ltd. (TSX-V: CBS) was a Canadian mining and exploration company headquartered in Vancouver. The company conducted exploratory drilling to assess mineral rights within the Lone Pine Molybdenum Property outside of Houston, British Columbia, specifically focusing on molybdenum. The company has also held interests in several other projects, including a 50% interest in the Wasi Creek Zinc Lead Silver Project, outside of Mackenzie, British Columbia.

== History ==
The Lone Pine property has seen extensive historical exploration. A Minister of Mines and Resources (Canada) annual report from 1914 was the first mention of workings on the property, detailing a shaft intersection of a narrow silver-lead-zinc-copper-gold bearing quartz vein. Various surface workings continued in the 1920s as additional veins were discovered.

Numerous companies from 1959 to 1971 conducted a variety of exploration over the property, however, it wasn't until 1976 that molybdenum mineralization was being sought after as a primary commodity. Between 1976 and 1992 continued exploration resulted in moderate molybdenum mineralization on the property.

The Lone Pine Property consists of seven mineral claims covering 1051 hectares, which are approximately 15 kilometers north-northwest of Houston, BC, and are situated in the Omineca Mining Division. The Property area extends over several molybdenum showings including Quartz Breccia, Alaskite Zone, Mineral Hill and Granby.

The Alaskite Zone is aptly named for the white, fine to medium grained quartz feldspar porphyry intrusive that was recognized and mapped in outcrop in 1967 as alaskite. The alaskite intrusive is the main focus of the Lone Pine Property drilling and has been interpreted as being the most favorable lithology for molybdenum mineralization. The alaskite intrusive to date continues to be drilled to the northwest of its original outcropping occurrence, BD-07-01 area, with exploration advancement to the northwest ongoing.
