= Korea Unha General Trading =

North Korean retail company

Korea Unha General Trading Corporation
- Native name: 조선 은하 무역 총 회사
- Industry: Export-Import
- Headquarters: Pyongyang, North Korea
- Area served: North Korea
- Products: Koryo Phalbong, Koryo Changphyong, Clothes, Shoes

Korea Unha General Trading Corporation (Chosongul: 조선은하무역총회사) is headquartered in Pyongyang, North Korea. It exports clothing and spring water, and imports textile and shoe industry raw materials, grain, gasoline and diesel oil. The company has a number of subsidiaries and has plants inside and outside North Korea. It was chartered in July 1976 and as of 2001 was one of the country's largest garment exporters.

During the COVID-19 pandemic in North Korea, textile factories of the Korea Unha General Trading Company largely suspended operations because of the COVID-19 pandemic affecting shipments from China.
