= Kraken Robotics =

Canadian marine technology company

Kraken Robotics Inc.
- Company type: Public
- Traded as: TSX-V: PNG OTCQB: KRKNF
- Industry: Marine technology
- Founded: 2012
- Headquarters: Mount Pearl, Newfoundland and Labrador, Canada
- Products: Synthetic aperture sonar (SAS); Underwater LiDAR systems; Subsea batteries
- Revenue: ▲CA$91.3 million (2024)
- Number of employees: 378 (2025)
- Website: krakenrobotics.com

Kraken Robotics Inc. is a Canadian marine technology company based in Newfoundland and Labrador. Founded in 2012, the company manufactures seabed imaging technology including synthetic aperture sonar (SAS) systems.

== History ==
Kraken Robotics was founded in 2012 as Kraken Sonar Systems Inc. by Karl Kenny, a marine technologist and businessman from Newfoundland and Labrador. The company focused on commercial synthetic aperture sonar (SAS) systems for imaging, with early customers including Defence Research and Development Canada for their 2014 search for the ships involved in Franklin's lost expedition. After Kraken's SAS technology was used to locate an Avro Arrow in Lake Ontario, the company secured a contract with Ocean Infinity to supply their Seabed Constructor with sonar equipment during their search for Malaysia Airlines Flight 370. The company went public on the TSX Venture Exchange on February 25, 2015, and, in 2017, changed its name to Kraken Robotics.

In 2025, Kraken expanded operations into the United States after acquiring 3D at Depth, an underwater LiDAR imaging company. In May 2025, the company received $3 million in orders for its SAS systems from customers in the Asia Pacific, Europe, and North America regions, including the Roger F. Wicker Center for Ocean Enterprise at the University of Southern Mississippi.
