= Korea General Magnesia Clinker Industry Group =

North Korean heavy industrial company

- Chosŏn'gŭl: 조선마그네샤크링카공업총회사
- Hancha: 朝鮮마그네샤크링카工業總會社
- Revised Romanization: Joseon Mageunesya Keuringka Gongeop Chong Hoesa
- McCune–Reischauer: Chosŏn Magŭnesya K'ŭringk'a Kongŏp Ch'ong Hoesa

Korea General Magnesia Clinker Industry Group is a mining and heavy industrial corporate group headquartered in Pyongyang, North Korea. The company produces magnesia clinker, slightly burnt magnesia, chlorite, firebricks and fireproofing materials.

The group imports some raw materials and some mining and industrial accessories.

In 2010, Vesuvius USA Corporation received a licence, from Office of Foreign Assets Control (OFAC), to import dead-burned magnesite into the United States from the Korea General Magnesia Clinker Industry Group.

== See also ==
- List of North Korean companies
- Economy of North Korea
