= Radient Technologies =

Canadian cannabis company

Radient Technologies Inc.
- Company type: Public
- Traded as: TSX-V: RTI; OTC Pink Current: RDDTF
- Industry: Cannabis
- Founded: 2001; 25 years ago
- Founder: Dr. Steven Splinter
- Headquarters: Edmonton, Canada
- Area served: Canada, Germany
- Key people: Steven Splinter (CEO), Frank Ferlaino (COB), Steven Splinter (CTO),
- Revenue: ▲ Can$2.489 million (2022)
- Operating income: ▼ Can$ -13.865 million (2022)
- Net income: ▼ Can$ -42.265 million (2022)
- Total assets: ▲ Can$ 28.860 million (2022)
- Total equity: ▲ Can$ 29.294 million (2022)
- Number of employees: 75-100
- Subsidiaries: Tunaaaaroom Xtracts, PBR Labs
- Website: www.radientinc.com

Radient Technologies is a Canadian licensed commercial manufacturer of cannabis derivatives and products, headquartered in Edmonton. It trades on the Toronto Venture Exchange and OTC Pink as RTI and RDDTF.

== History ==
The company says that its patented extraction technology Microwave Assisted Processing (MAP) extracts a higher amount of the desired cannabinoids from the leaf, and that the process allows it to heat the cannabis biomass with more precision, using less solvent than the methods being used by other companies, with higher throughput and improved economies of scale.

In 2017 Aurora Cannabis made an investment of $6.2 million in the company.

On March 21, 2023, Radiant Technologies Inc. filed for receivership.
