= Bayóvar =

Port in north Peru

Coordinates: 05°49′55″S 81°01′30″W

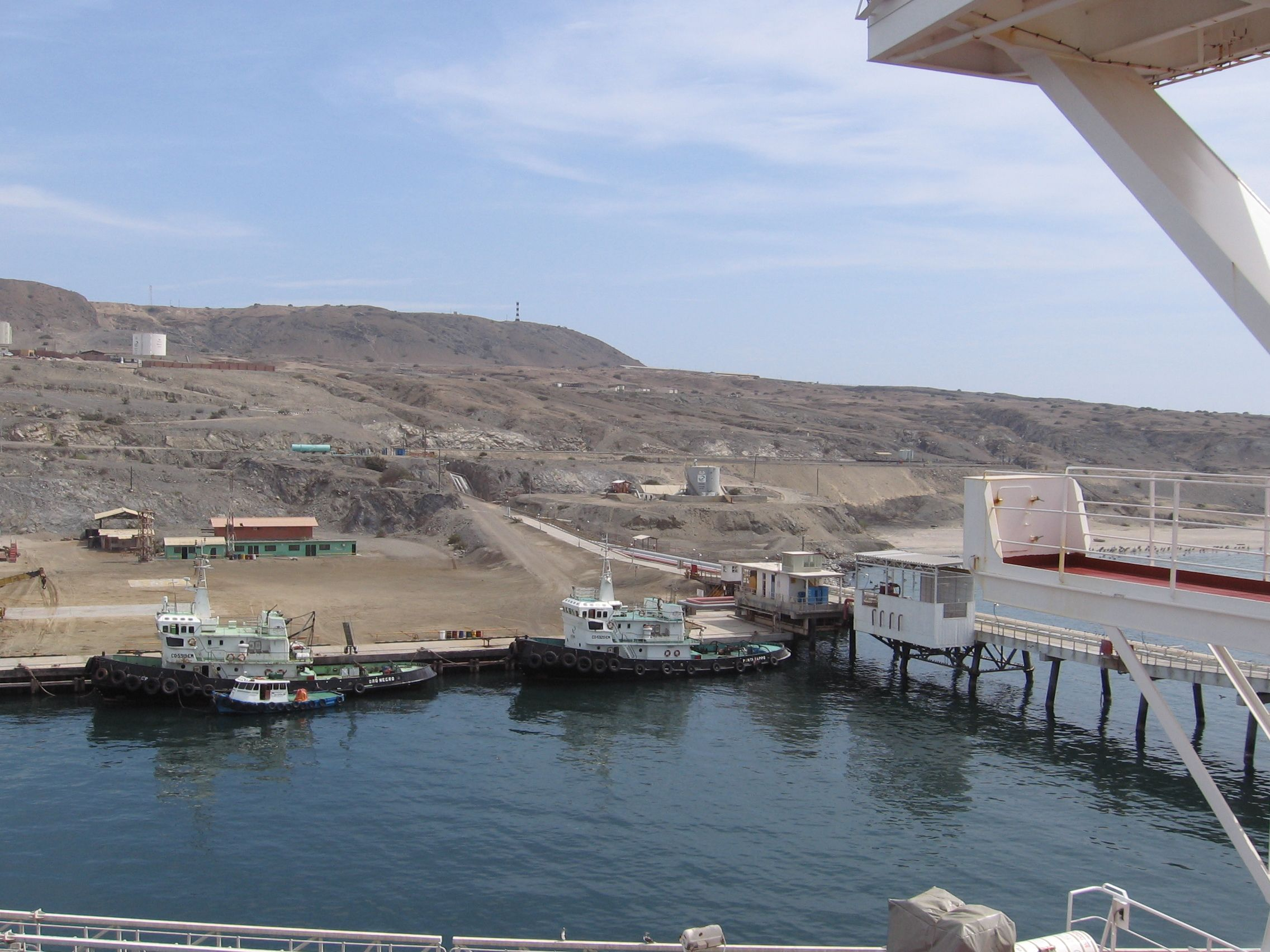
Puerto Bayovar

The Port of Bayóvar is located in the north of Peru. It has a capacity for ships - tanks of 16 thousand 500 to 250 thousand TM. The port has shelter in the form of a large bay.

== Transport ==
In 2009, it was proposed to build a railway for mineral traffic to this port by 2019. Also to Paita port.

Another plan proposes the construction of a railway over the Andes via Pucallpa to Cruzeiro do Sul in Brazil.
