= Wavefront Technology Solutions =

Wavefront Technology Solutions Inc.
- Company type: Public
- Traded as: TSX-V: WEE; Expert Market: WFTSF
- Industry: Petroleum industry
- Founded: 1997 by Brett Davidson
- Headquarters: Edmonton, Alberta, Canada
- Products: Powerwave; Primawave
- Revenue: ▲US$1.61 million (2021)
- Operating income: ▼$1.57 million (2021)
- Net income: ▼$1.37 million (2021)
- Number of employees: 27 (2010)
- Website: www.onthewavefront.com

Wavefront Technology Solutions Inc. is a provider of secondary oil recovery and environmental technologies. The company was founded in 1997 as PE-TECH by Brett Davidson and University of Alberta professor Tim Spanos. The company was later renamed to Wavefront Technology Solutions Inc. The company provides technology to aid in the recovery of stranded oil, which uses pulse technology to simulate the effects of the aftershock of an earthquake. This technology is used for fluid flow optimization having applications in both the environmental and energy sectors. In the environmental sector, the process is marketed as Primawave, while in the energy sector it is marketed as Powerwave.

The company's Powerwave technology has been put to use in more than 175 well applications throughout North America, including applications in California, Oklahoma, and Alberta.

The company is headquartered in Edmonton, Alberta, Canada, and has offices in Calgary, Alberta, and Cambridge, Ontario. The company also has offices in Houston, Texas and Raleigh, North Carolina.

== History ==
Brett Davidson and University of Alberta professor Tim Spanos teamed up in 1997 to fulfill a need that they believed to exist in the onshore oil drilling industry. While working on an oil well stimulation site in Alberta, Canada, Davidson heard from a friend in the industry that there was a need for fast, effective, and inexpensive stimulation treatment for oil wells.

In 1997 Davidson and Spanos established PE-TECH Inc. (Pulse Enhancement Technology Inc.). PE-TECH operated three subsidiaries; Prism Production Technologies Inc., Wavefront Environmental Technologies Inc., and E2 Solutions Inc. (US subsidiary standing for "Energy and Environmental"). In 2000 the shareholders of the privately held PE-TECH Inc. entered an agreement with a publicly listed company (or in this case a shell of a company) on the TSX Venture Exchange.

A reverse takeover of that entity transformed PE-TECH Inc., from a privately held company to a publicly traded company under the name Wavefront Energy and Environmental Services Inc. For consistency in name branding, Prism Production Technologies was renamed Wavefront Reservoir Technologies Inc., Wavefront Environmental Technologies was rolled into Wavefront Reservoir Technologies Inc., and E2 Solutions Inc. was renamed Wavefront Energy and Environmental Services USA Inc. Effective March 27, 2009, the company's name was changed to "Wavefront Technology Solutions Inc."

== Products ==
Wavefront offers two primary products, Powerwave targeting the Energy sector and Primawave targeting the Environmental sector. The two technologies operate on the same basic scientific principal, utilizing a pulse that momentarily expands the pore structure of rock and soil to improve liquid flow in the ground.

=== Powerwave ===
In the energy sector, Wavefront Technology Solutions Inc. has trademarked the Power Pulse Technology as Powerwave, which is primarily focused on secondary oil recovery. Powerwave utilizes this technology to improve the flow of water through geological materials, including sedimentary soils and fractured rock. These materials are composed of a solid matrix and pore structure, which contain fluids such as gas and oil.

The Powerwave tool generates a fluid displacement wave in the porous media akin to ripples from a stone thrown in a pond. These ripples generate high liquid accelerations in the pores facing liquids out or treatment fluids in.

=== Primawave ===
In the environmental sector, Wavefront Technology Solutions Inc. has trademarked the Power Pulse Technology as Primawave. Primawave is used largely in the United States. It is licensed to service providers to use the process in conjunction with established methods to treat and eliminate hazardous chemicals from contaminated groundwater.

== See also ==
- Enhanced Oil Recovery
- Water injection (oil production)
- Oil reserves
- Oil sands
