= Noko Jeans =

Swedish company which sold North Korean clothes

- Type: Private
- Industry: Clothing
- Founded: 2007; 19 years ago in Sweden
- Founder: Jakob Ohlsson, Jacob Aström, Tor Rauden Källstigen
- Defunct: 2011
- Fate: Dissolved
- Headquarters: Sweden
- Production output: 1,100 jeans (2009)
- Brands: Kara, Oke

Noko Jeans (Korean: 노코진스) was a Swedish fashion company. The company was best known for importing jeans from North Korea. Although the company was not the first to import jeans from North Korea, it was the first company to insist to keep the label 'Made in North Korea' on the jeans. The company was founded in 2007 and ceased operations in 2011, however the company continued to post on social media until 2013.

== History ==
Noko Jeans was founded by Swedish entrepreneurs Jakob Ohlsson, Jacob Aström and Tor Rauden Källstigen. The idea for the company came after they got drunk.

On July 20, 2007, they were scrolling through a North Korean website and noticed a new page titled "Business". After clicking on a button, they found a list of goods that North Korea claimed to be able to export. They sent a email to the contact address and claimed that they were import-export managers of a fictitious company. A few hours later, they received a response thanking them for their interest.

In November 2007, North Korean Embassy in Stockholm made a call to them. A North Korean attempted to convince them to buy a zinc factory and make jackets instead. In December 2007, they provided two pairs of jeans, one of them being a used pair, to North Korean delegation for inspection at a textile factory.

On July 27, 2008, the trio arrived in Pyongyang on a train from Beijing. The next 10 days were spent visiting textile factories. They were rejected by North Korea’s biggest textile producing company, but struck a deal with North Korea’s largest mining company, Trade4, which was also involved in textile on their last day in North Korea. They signed a contract to produce 1,100 pairs of black jeans.

On November 11, 2009, after two years, the jeans arrived at last in Stockholm. The jeans were intended to be sold at The Noko Jeans shop on December 4, which the label describes as its "museum", as well as at Aplace, a retail space within the PUB department store. The department store refused to cooperate, claiming that it did not wish to become involved in politics. In 2010, the North Korean manufacturer also annulled their agreements with company.

The company remained in business until 2011. In 2013, the company claimed to have only 100 pairs of jeans left. From December 18, 2009 to February 6, 2010, Noko Jeans had a museum in Södermalm, Stockholm.

== Design ==
The two unisex models were designed in collaboration with fashion designer Julia Hederus. Both models are designed based on the Noko Jeans story. Both of the models were made in black denim.

Kara Slim Fit is a tighter model with a regular waist.

Oke Loose Fit is more baggy, with a drop-crotch. Oke Loose Fit has a regular waist.

The karaoke bar where the founders spent their first evening in Pyongyang served as the inspiration for the names, Kara and Oke.

== Production ==
The founders claimed that they had packed spools of sewing thread and large amounts of cash in their bags when they went to North Korea. They brought the cash for the production with them because it was too complicated to do it through ordinary bank channels. They also said they had to supply everything all the materials needed as North Korea doesn't produce anything.

At one point they were asked to import a zinc smelting oven and another asked for a pirated copy of Adobe Acrobat as the person couldn't read the files they were sending him.

In 2009, when the founders returned to North Korea to see the progress, the jeans were not yet ready as the buttons were stuck somewhere between Pakistan and Pyongyang.

A total of 1,100 pairs of jeans were made by a mining company in Pyongyang during 2009. Each pair of jeans cost 1,500 kronor (£131) or ($220) which is more than two years' wages for the average North Korean.
