= Lundin =

Lundin is a Swedish surname. Notable people with the surname include:

- Adolf H. Lundin (1932–2006), Swedish oil and mining entrepreneur
- Albin Lundin (born 1996), Swedish ice hockey player
- Alexander Lundin (born 1992), Swedish football player
- Alva Lundin (1889–1972), Swedish title card and credit designer and artist
- Anders Lundin (born 1958), Swedish television host
- Andrew Peter Lundin III (1944–2001), nephrologist
- Andreas Petrus Lundin (1869–1929), Swedish marine engineer
- Augusta Lundin (1840–1919), Swedish fashion designer
- Bert Lundin (1921–2018), Swedish union leader
- Cody Lundin (born 1967), American survivalist
- Deanne Lundin, American poet
- Erik Lundin (1904–1988), Swedish chess master
- Frederick Lundin (1868–1947), American politician
- Fredrik Lundin (born 1963), Danish jazz saxophonist, composer and bandleader
- Göran Lundin (born 1950), Swedish author
- Hjalmar Lundin (1870–1941), Swedish wrestler
- Hulda Lundin (1847–1921), Swedish tailor
- Ian Lundin (born 1960), Swedish billionaire
- Kristian Lundin (born 1973), Swedish composer, music producer and songwriter
- Lova Lundin (born 1995), Swedish footballer
- Lukas Lundin (1958–2022), Swedish billionaire
- Marietta de Pourbaix-Lundin (born 1951), Swedish politician
- Marika Bergman-Lundin (born 1999), Swedish football player
- Mike Lundin (born 1984), American ice hockey player
- Morgan Lundin, Swedish archer
- Pål Lundin (born 1964), Swedish football player
- Peter Lundin (born 1971), Danish criminal
- Roger Lundin, Swedish football manager
- Sofie Lundin (born 2000), Swedish ice hockey player
- Stefan Lundin (born 1955), Swedish football player and manager
- Sten Lundin (1931–2016), Swedish motocross racer
- Tage Lundin (1933–2019), Swedish biathlon competitor
- Therese Lundin (footballer) (born 1979), Swedish footballer
- Therèse Lundin (swimmer) (born 1970), Swedish swimmer
- Thomas Lundin, Swedish football manager
- Thomas de Lundin, 13th-century Scottish nobleman
- Ulf Lundin (born 1965), Swedish artist
- Victor Lundin (1930–2013), American character actor

== See also ==
- de Lundin, surname of an old Norman noble family

== Places ==
- Lundin Links, Fife, Scotland, United Kingdom
- Lundin Peak, a summit in Washington state
- Lundin's Neck, a mountain pass in Lesotho

== Companies ==
- Carson and Lundin, a former architectural firm
- Lundin Mining, a copper, zinc, and nickel mining company
- Lundin Petroleum, a petroleum company
