= Johan Sverdrup oil field =

Norwegian oil field in the North Sea

Johan Sverdrup field
- Location within North Sea
- Country: Norway
- Region: Southern North Sea
- Location: Utsira High
- Block: 16/2 and 16/3
- Offshore/onshore: offshore
- Coordinates: 59.22°N 2.49°E
- Operator: Equinor
- Partners: Equinor; Lundin Petroleum; Total E&P Norge; Petoro; Aker BP

Field history
- Discovery: 2010
- Start of production: October 2019
- Peak year: 2023

Production
- Current production of oil: 700,000 barrels per day (~3.5×10^{7} t/a)
- Year of current production of oil: 2025
- Estimated oil in place: 2,800 million barrels (~3.8×10^{8} t)

The Johan Sverdrup oil field (Sverdrup Field) is an oil field in the North Sea, about 140 kilometres (87 mi) west of Stavanger, Norway. The field lies in two different production licenses and consists of two different discoveries, Avaldsnes (where Aker BP is the operator) and Aldous Major South (where Equinor is the operator). When it was revealed that these discoveries constituted a single field, it was renamed Johan Sverdrup after the father of Norwegian parliamentarism. The field has not yet been unitized between production licenses 501, 501B, and 265. According to Statoil, the field is in 110 to 120 metres water depth, and the reservoir is at 1,900 meters depth.

== Field development ==
In March 2012, after the signing of a pre-unit agreement between the different licensees, Statoil (now Equinor) was appointed working operator. Production began in 2019. Originally, peak production was estimated to be over 500,000 barrels per day (79,000 m^{3}/d), which would make it by far the largest producing oil field in the North Sea by the time it reaches its peak. However, the field continuously exceeded such original expectations, and as in June 2021, a new peak increase from 720 to 755 thousand bpd was announced by Equinor for Phase 2. The oil produced at the field will be transported by pipelines to the Mongstad refinery where it will be shipped and refined.

The first stage of development Phase 1 will consist of four-platform field hub producing 440,000 barrels per day after startup in late 2019. Its front-end engineering and design work was awarded to Aker Solutions, who were also awarded the contract for the detailed engineering phase in January 2015. The platform jacket work for 3 Platforms (P1, DP and RP) was awarded to Kværner built in Verdal Yard near Trondheim. Dragados was awarded the contract for the LQ jacket to be built in Spain.

The field development includes high-voltage direct current (HVDC) link that will supply the Johan Sverdrup offshore oilfield development with electricity from the onshore grid. Supplying power from shore to run the oil platforms, instead of using local generation, this lowers CO_{2} emissions from the production by 85% (Or 14,33Kg). On the other hand this will only lower CO_{2} emissions by 3,2% in total (From 447Kg to 432,67Kg). ABB will design, engineer, supply and commission the equipment for two ±80 kilovolt 100 MW HVDC converter stations, using Voltage-Sourced Converters (VSC) technology. The Martin Linge oil field is also supplied via Sverdrup.

The project includes installation, supervision and site services. One station will be situated on-shore at Haugsneset, near the Statoil Kårstø plant on the Norwegian west coast, the other on the platform situated 155 km west of the Norwegian coastline. Further studies will examine if HVDC power can be fed to other platforms in nearby fields. The first 100 MW came online in 2018, with further 100 MW phases to start in 2023.

Phase 2 will be for a fifth Platform P2 capable of processing 220,000 barrels per day. This contract was awarded to Aibel to be built in their yard in Haugesund, Norway. Electricity is to be supplied from shore by 62 km of 132kV AC seacables.

On February 13, 2015, Statoil announced it will proceed to develop the Johan Sverdrup field despite disagreements over ownership stakes with fellow Norwegian upstream Aker BP.

== Production ==
Norway's crude oil production stood at 1.75 million barrels per day in February 2020, up 26% from a year ago thanks to the ramp-up of Johan Sverdrup oilfield.

Equinor in March 2020 expected Sverdrup to hit a daily output of 470,000 bpd in early May 2020, up from around 350,000 bpd at end-2019. The cost of NOK 83 billion were paid off in 2021.

Production hit 537,000 bpd in October 2021. Production was expected to increase to 755,000 bpd in 2022.

The field reached its plateau production target of 755,000 bpd in May 2023.

Production started to decline from early 2025.

== Contractors ==
- Aker Solutions - (FEED, RP Riser Platform and P1 Production Platform, and Offshore Hookup)
- Aibel - (FEED)
- Aibel - (DP Drilling Platform)
- Aibel - (Phase 2 P2 Production Platform)
- Dragados - (LQ Jacket)
- Kvaerner - (3 Jackets and Offshore Hookup)
- Kvaerner & KBR Joint Venture (K2JV) - (LQ Utility & Living Quarters Platform)
- Energomontaż-Północ Gdynia S.A.
- Mitsui & Co
- Nippon Steel & Sumitomo Metal (NSSMC)
- Wasco Coatings Malaysia Sdn Bhd
- Saipem Ltd
