= HB Antwerp =

Diamond company

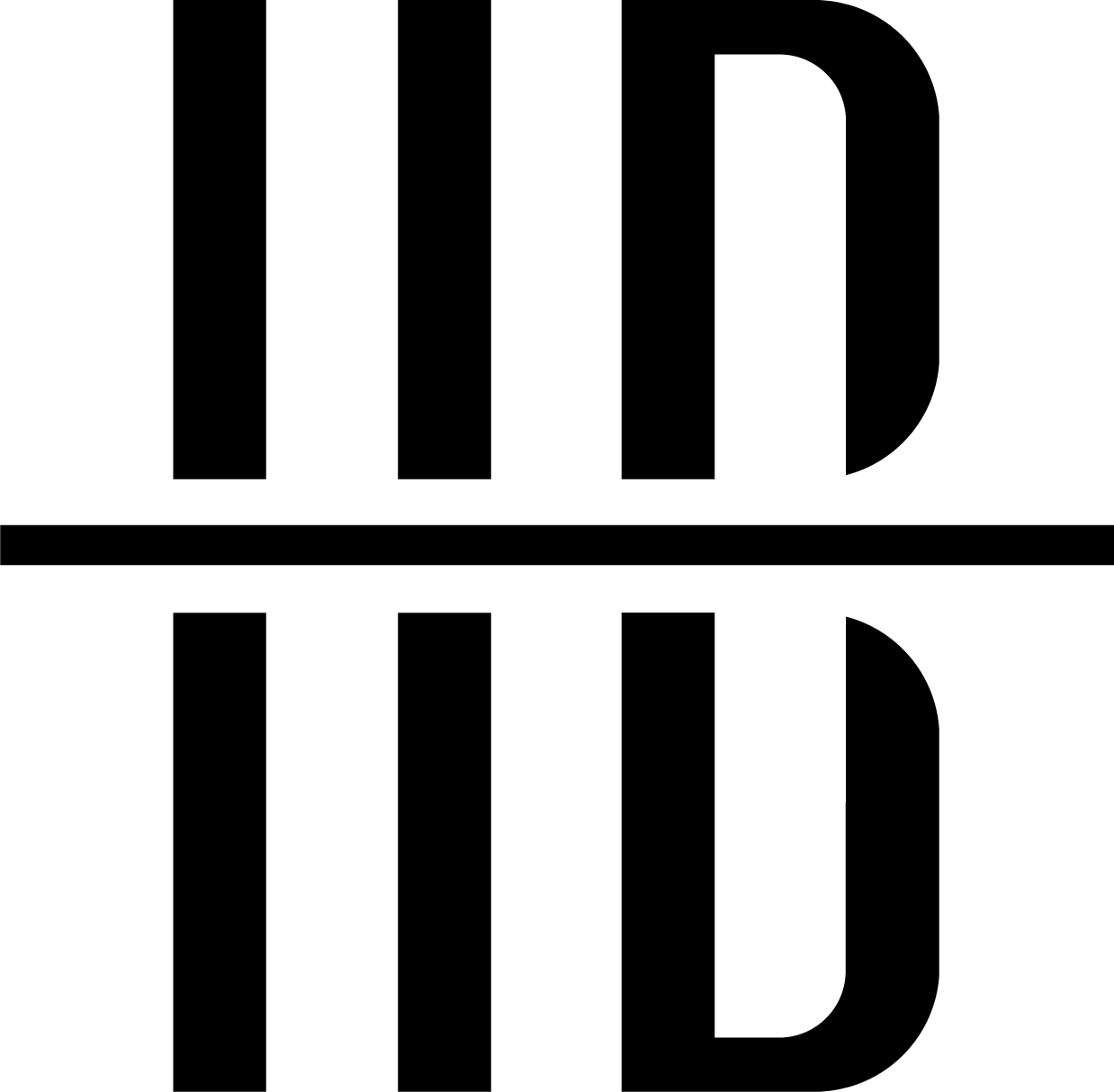
- Company type: Private
- Industry: Technology; Diamond manufacturing
- Founded: 2020
- Headquarters: Antwerp, Belgium
- Key people: Oded Mansori (Founder, Managing Partner); Shai de Toledo (Founder, Managing Partner); Rafael Papismedov (Founder, Managing Partner); Boaz Lev (Founder, Managing Partner)
- Number of employees: 107 (2022)

HB Antwerp is a diamond cutting and technology company based in Antwerp, Belgium. It was founded in 2020 by Shai de Toledo, Rafael Papismedov, Oded Mansori and Boaz Lev.

== History ==
HB Antwerp purchases rough diamonds from the Karowe mine in Botswana through a deal with Canadian mining company Lucara Diamond Corporation and works in partnership with the Botswana government.

In 2020, HB Antwerp partnered with Lucara and Louis Vuitton to work on several large stones, including the "Sewelo" diamond, the "Sethunya", a 549-carat diamond, and a 1,175-carat rough diamond, all discovered in the Karowe mine in Botswana. In August 2020, they entered an agreement to purchase all of Lucara’s large stones (10.8 carats and up) and, in 2022, they signed a ten-year contract. The contract was terminated in October 2023. In February 2024 a new 10-year diamond sales agreement was signed with Lucara. In 2022, the company partnered with Microsoft to verify and track mined gems; all data about their trajectory is stored on a blockchain. Later that year it partnered with engineering company Comate to devise mini safes in which diamonds are stored and tracked.

In September 2022, during the United Nations General Assembly, Botswana president Mokgweetsi Masisi referred to the government's arrangement with the HB Antwerp as a model for other African countries. He also pointed to the agreement during his negotiations with diamond corporation De Beers, threatening to end the partnership if new terms weren't agreed upon. In March 2023, Masisi announced that Botswana would acquire a 24% stake in HB Antwerp.

The company established Signum, a rough diamond brand which sells directly to the public and sold 12 Non-fungible token diamonds in January 2022.

HB Antwerp opened HB Botswana, a new cutting and polishing facility in Gaborone, Botswana, in 2023.
