= MIET =

MIET may refer to:

- Member of the Institution of Engineering and Technology

== Organisations in Greece ==
- Cultural Foundation of the National Bank (Greece) (transliteration: Morfotiko Idryma Ethnikis Trapezis)

== Organisations in India ==
- Model Institute of Engineering and Technology, Jammu, Jammu and Kashmir
- Modern Institute of Engineering and Technology, Hooghly, West Bengal

== Organisations in Russian Federation ==
- Moscow Institute of Electronic Technology (currently National Research University of Electronic Technology), Zelenograd, Moscow
