= Cultural Center of the National Bank of Greece in Thessaloniki =

Museum in Thessaloniki, Greece

Coordinates: 40.6048°N 22.9521°E

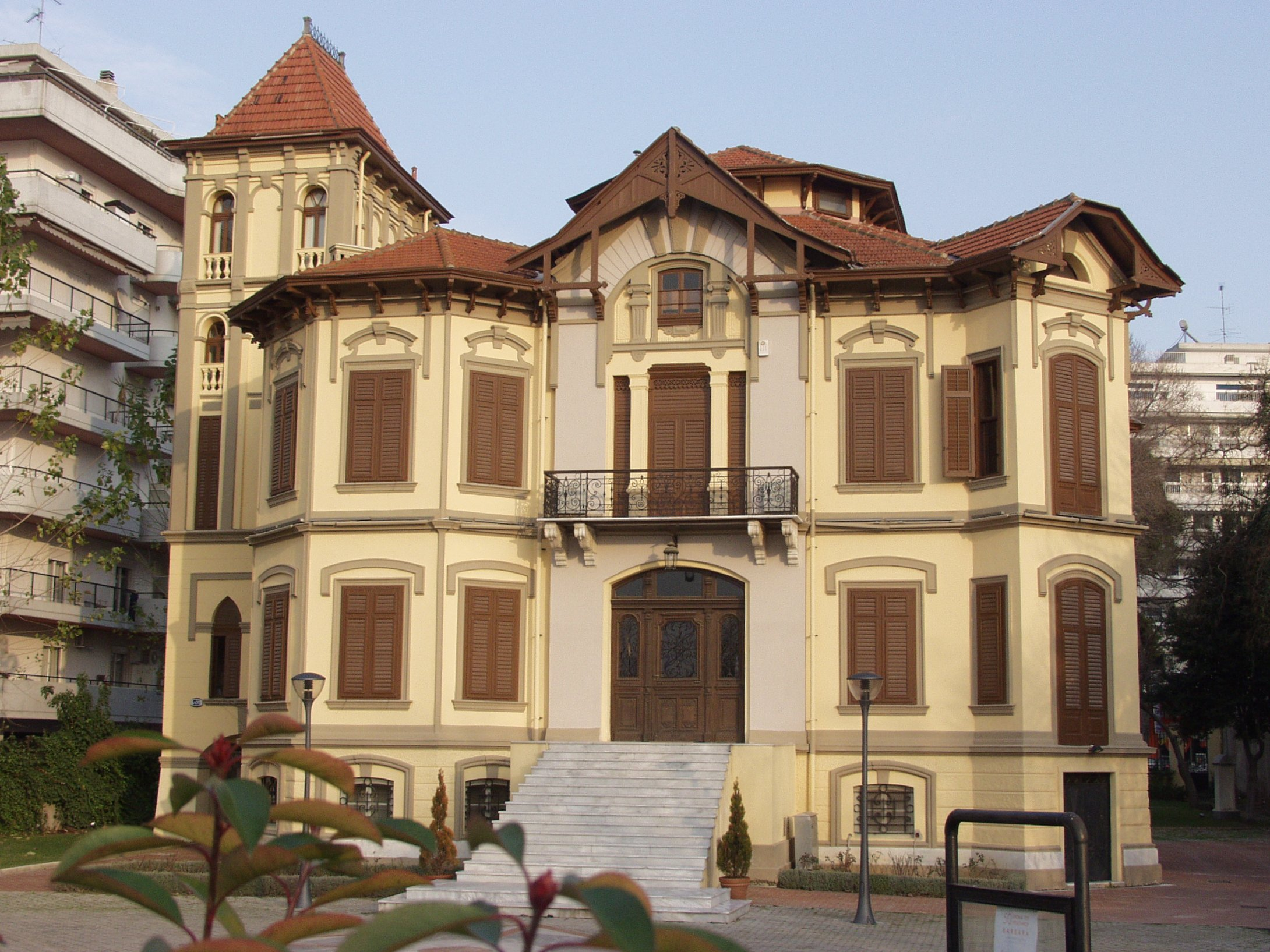
View from Megas Alexandros Avenue

The Cultural Center of the National Bank of Greece in Thessaloniki (Πολιτιστικό Κέντρο του Μ.Ι.Ε.Τ. στη Θεσσαλονίκη) is a museum in Thessaloniki, Central Macedonia, Greece. It belongs to the Cultural Foundation of the National Bank.

== History ==
The centre was established in 1989 in the restored Villa Mehmet Kapanci, which was built between 1890 and 1895, designed by Pietro Arrigoni for Mehmet Kapanci, a Dönmeh of Thessaloniki. From 1938 to 1940 and from 1945 to 1972 the building was housed the state secondary school Fifth Boys’ Gymnasium.

Eleftherios Venizelos also used the historic building when he was in Thessaloniki in 1916–17 during the Movement of National Defence and in later years it was a high school. The centre houses the collection of contemporary Greek art owned by the Cultural Foundation of the National Bank.

== Description ==
The Cultural Centre is a department of the National Bank of Greece, which was established in 1989 with the aim of contributing to the intellectual life of northern Greece. It mounts exhibitions, holds lectures, shows films, and liaises with other cultural institutions in Thessaloniki.

It also mounts exhibitions on the history of Thessaloniki, Mount Athos and northern Greece in general, backed up by scholarly papers, publications, and experimental lessons in landscape painting for schools.

It mounts frequent exhibitions of visual art, applied art, and architecture. The first half of 2000 saw an exhibition titled Likourgos Koyevinas: Drawings and Copperplate Engravings, three exhibitions of photographs by Nick Wapplington (England), Ulf Lundin (Sweden), and Chistina Vazou (Greece) as part of the Photosynkyria festival, and an exhibition of autochrome photographs titled Thessaloniki 1913 and 1918: The First Colour Photographs of the Century.

== Gallery ==
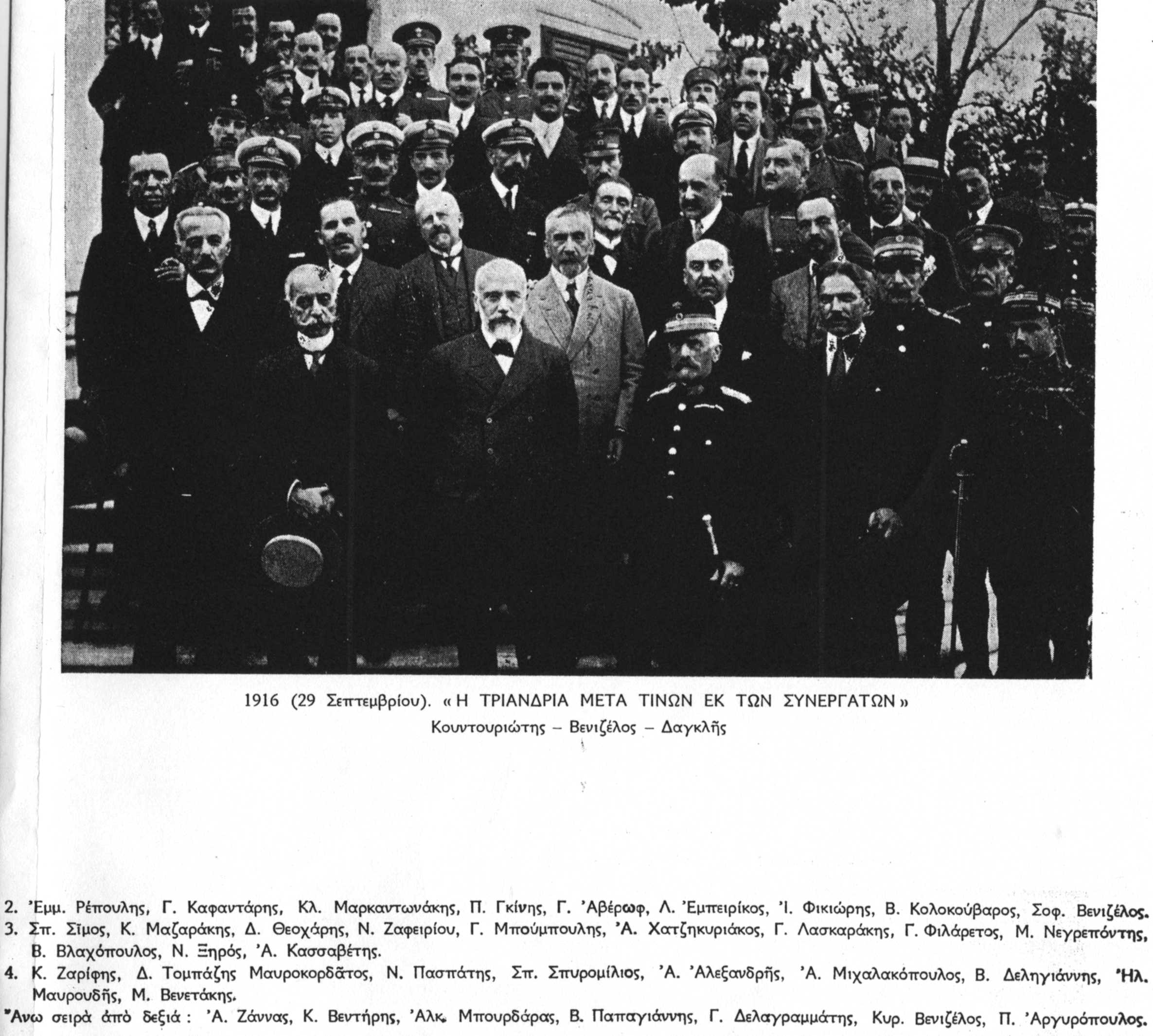
The "National Defence" government in front of the building

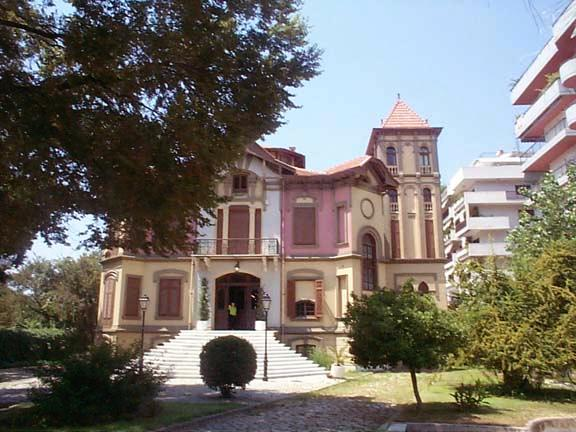
View from outside

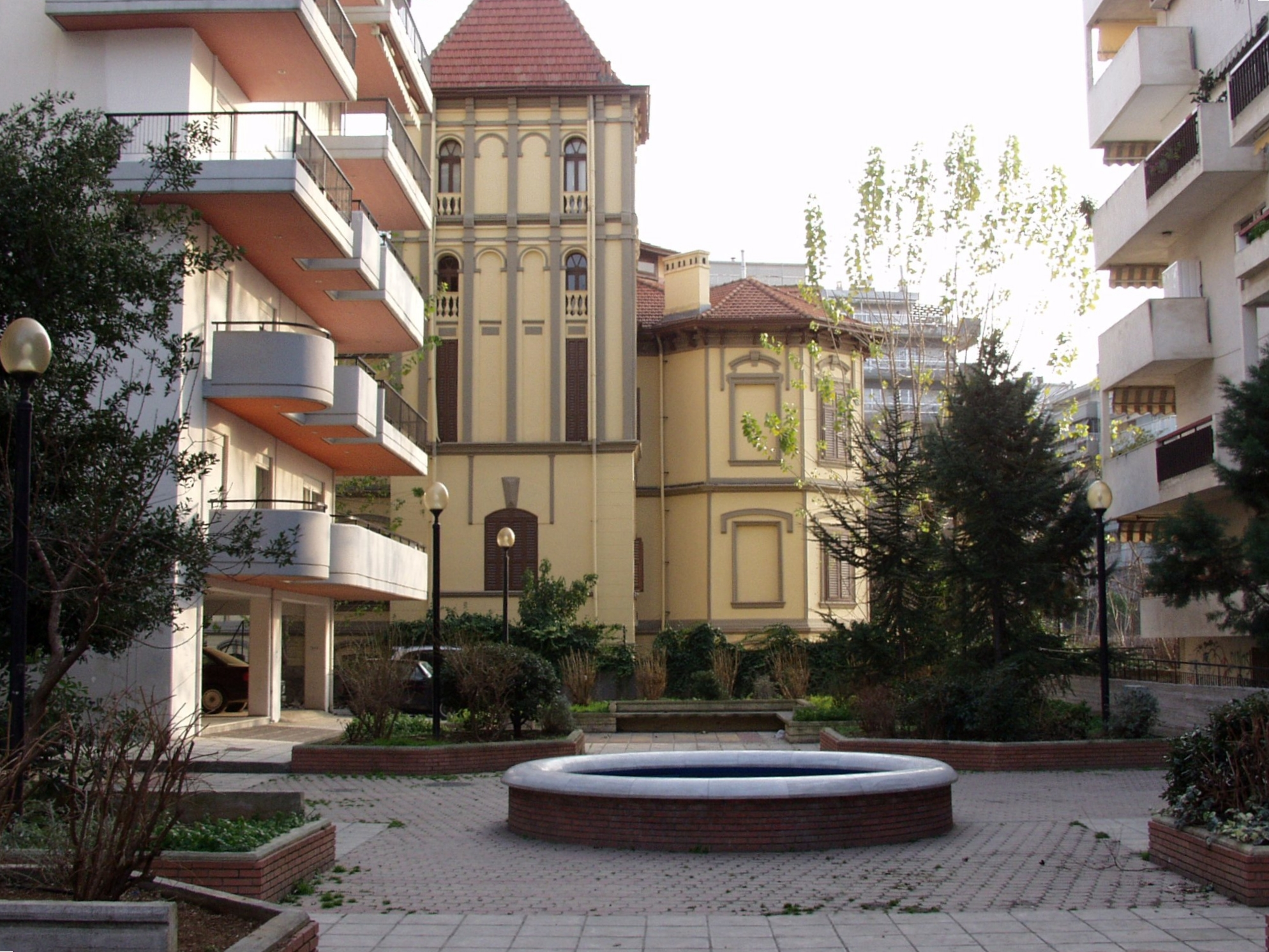
Side view

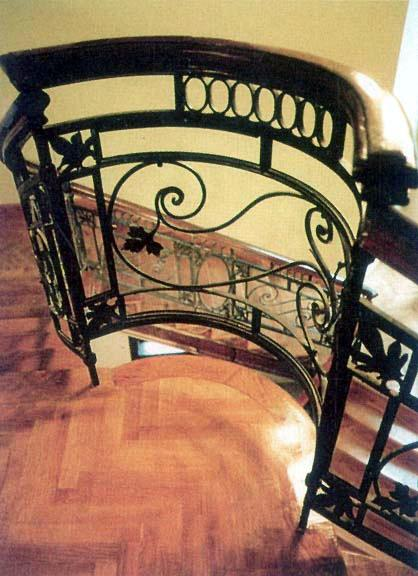
Detail of the interior

== Sources ==
- This article incorporates text from the corresponding article at the Museums of Macedonia website, commissioned by the Macedonian Heritage foundation, written by Vlasis Vlasidis, and published under a CC-BY-SA-3.0 license.
