= Sewelô =

Fourth largest rough diamond ever found

The Sewelô diamond is the fourth-largest rough diamond ever found. The diamond was recovered in April 2019 by the Lucara Diamond Corp in its Karowe diamond mine in Botswana. The diamond is 1,758 carats and weighs 352 grams or 12.39 oz.

At the time it was found, Sewelô was the largest diamond in Botswana's history, surpassing the 1,111 carats (222 g, 7.83 oz.) Lesedi La Rona extracted at the same mine on 16 November 2015. The Lesedi La Rona was the fourth-largest diamond ever found, and the third-largest of gem quality.

The gem was named through a competition held by Lucara. Out of 22,000 submissions the name Sewelô was chosen, which translates 'rare find' in Setswana. In January 2020 it was announced that Louis Vuitton had purchased the diamond for an undisclosed sum. Louis Vuitton will work with HB Antwerp to polish the diamond and cut it into smaller stones.

The stone is covered with a thin layer of opaque black carbon and its surface is pitted. It is the size of a tennis ball but weighs six times more. The HB Company has applied novel mapping methods using artificial intelligence in order to optimise the design and to maximize the chance of success in cutting the diamond. The diamond has been described as a "near-gem of variable quality, including domains of high-quality white gem", an industrial diamond with sections that could produce gem-quality stones. Further analysis was in progress as of April 2021.

== See also ==
- Kimberlite
- Lesedi La Rona
- List of diamonds
- List of largest rough diamonds
- List of diamond mines
- List of mines in Botswana
