= Jacket (disambiguation) =

A jacket is a garment for the upper body. The word may also mean:

== Coverings ==
- Bullet jacket, the plating/covering of a bullet's core with metal to give it a higher velocity
- Dust jacket, the detachable outer cover of a book
- Record jacket, the outermost cardboard covering of a record
- Water jacket, a water-filled casing surrounding a device

== Arts and entertainment ==
- Jacket (magazine), an online poetry magazine
- The Jacket (2005), an American film directed by John Maybury
- "The Jacket" (Seinfeld), 1991 television episode
- "The Jacket" (Atlanta), 2016 television episode
- The Jacket (novel) or The Star Rover, a 1915 novel by Jack London
- The Jacket (book), a 2001 children's book by Andrew Clements
- The main character in Hotline Miami and a supporting character in Hotline Miami 2: Wrong Number

== People ==
- Barbara Jacket (1934–2022), American retired track and field coach
- Ileana Jacket (born 1947), German-born Venezuelan actress

== Other uses ==
- Jacket, Missouri, United States, an unincorporated community
- Jacket (software), the GPU engine for MATLAB
- The supporting legs and lattice framework of an offshore fixed platform or wind turbine
- Berkeley High Jacket, the student newspaper of Berkeley High School, California

== See also ==
- Jacket matrix, a square matrix that is a generalization of the Hadamard matrix
- Jacket potato, a baked potato filled with other ingredients
- Greenjackets (disambiguation)
- Red Jacket (disambiguation)
- Yellowjacket (disambiguation)
