= Black Earth Farming =

- Company type: Public
- Industry: Agriculture
- Founded: 2005 in Russia
- Founder: Michel Orlov
- Defunct: 2019
- Fate: Liquidated
- Headquarters: St Helier, Jersey
- Area served: Russia
- Key people: Richard Warburton (CEO)
- Products: Land acquisition, farming
- Net income: 231m roubles (2013)
- Subsidiaries: LLC Managing Company AGRO-Invest
- Website: blackearthfarming.com at the Wayback Machine (archived January 12, 2019)

Black Earth Farming was a foreign investment-run agriculture business based in Russia. The company was registered in the British island of Jersey and operating as LLC Managing Company AGRO-Invest to invest and operate Russian farm land.

At its peak it controlled more than 3,000 square kilometres (1,200 sq mi) of land in the Central Russian Black Earth Region. Their business goal had been described as the acquisition of "cheap, neglected, but fertile land in the fertile Black Earth regions of Russia" by CEO Richard Warburton.

It was sometimes described as a land grab company. The company was liquidated in 2019.

== History ==
They had a contract with PepsiCo, growing sugar beets and potatoes for them. Other crops include winter wheat, oilseeds, and a variety of other grains.

The company raised its initial funding from the family backed Swedish investment companies Vostok Nafta and Kinnevik who remain major shareholders.

The company sold all its assets and entered voluntary liquidation in 2019.
