= Karowe diamond mine =

Mine in Botswana

- Location of Karowe diamond mine
- Location: Central District, Botswana; 21°29′59″S 25°28′16″E
- Products: Diamonds
- Company: Lucara Diamond

Karowe diamond mine is a mine located in Botswana. It is an open-pit mine. In 2021, Lucara Diamond secured $220 million to take the mine underground.

== History ==
The Karowe Mine ("Karowe" is a local Sesarwa term for "a precious stone"), situated in northern Botswana was discovered in 1970 by De Beers, which also found the Orapa, the country's first diamond mine, plus three others in the mid-1970s.

De Beers discovered the kimberlite A/K6, but their early evaluation showed low economic importance, the mine having only a 3.4-hectare surface area. The ownership was transferred three times. In 2009, De Beers sold their 70% shareholding in the mine to Canadian company Lucara Diamond for $49 million. Later, Lucara acquired full ownership of the mine.

The mine was commissioned in 2012. In June, the first sale of rough diamonds from the mine was held. Generally, its first years of production went better.

The company uses modern equipment, giving them the ability to recover large diamonds that the mine has become known for. One piece of equipment is X-ray Transmission (XRT) technology, introduced in 2015, which later resulted in the recovery of a number of diamonds over 300 carats or 60 grams each.

By mid-2018, the mine was employing over 800 people, more than 98% of them were local citizens.

== Notable diamond discoveries ==
In 2015, seven diamonds were recovered in the mine, more than 60 g (300 carats) each; three of them within a week in November: "Lesedi La Rona" (originally 222.2 g (1,111 carats); after cleaning, 221.8 g (1,109 carats)) "The Constellation" (160.6 g (803 carats)) and an unnamed 374-ct gem. Along with the earlier-recovered 68.4 g (342 carats) "Queen of the Kalahari", all of them, with a combined weight of 527.6 g (2,638 carats) were sold for $154 million.

Notably, "Lesedi La Rona" (Tswana term for "Our Light") was then the world's second largest gem-quality rough diamond, following the Cullinan Diamond recovered in 1905 in the present-day South Africa. At the same time, it was also Botswana's largest, surpassing that found at the Jwaneng Mine in 1993. In 2017, it was sold to London-based jeweller Graff for $53 million.

Lucara later beat its own record discovery twice. In 2019, Sewelô, a 351.6 g (1,758 carats) diamond, was found at the same mine. It was later bought by French brand Louis Vuitton for an undisclosed amount.

On August 22, 2024, Lucara announced the discovery of a 498.4 g (2,492 carats) rough diamond there. Currently, it is the second-largest gem-quality diamond ever found and, according to the government of Botswana, the largest ever discovered in the country.
