= Ippokrateio General Hospital, Thessaloniki =

Hospital in Thessaloniki, Greece

Ippokrateio General Hospital
- National Health System

Geography
- Location: Thessaloniki, Greece
- Coordinates: 40°36′47″N 22°57′45″E

History
- Former name: Hirsch Hospital
- Constructed: 1908

Links
- Website: www.ippokratio.gr
- Lists: Hospitals in Greece

Ippokrateio General Hospital of Thessaloniki (Greek: Ιπποκράτειο Γενικο Νοσοκομείο Θεσσαλονίκης) is a public hospital in Thessaloniki, Greece.

The main building was constructed in 1908 as Hirsch Hospital funded by Maurice de Hirsch (architect Pietro Arrigoni) and served the needs of the Jewish community of Thessaloniki.

During the Axis occupation of Greece it was used by the German army. It was renamed after World War II. Today it is part of the National Health System and is the largest hospital in Thessaloniki.

== Sources ==
- Ιπποκράτειο Νοσοκομείο
- ippokratio.gr
