= SEK Class Δα =

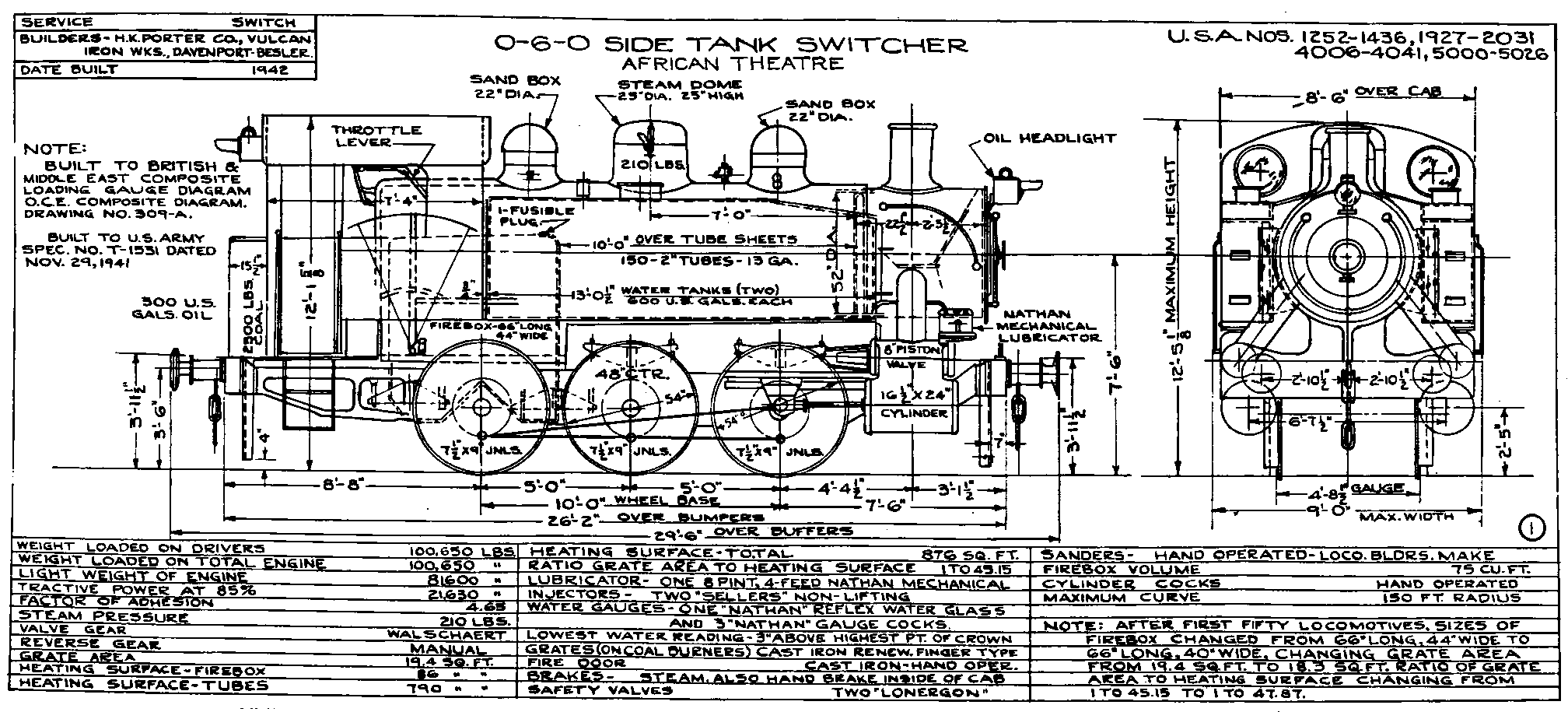
Original drawings for the S100 (1941)

SEK Class Δα (or Class Da; Delta-alpha) was a class of twenty 0-6-0T steam locomotives of the Hellenic State Railways in Greece. These were ex-United States Army Transportation Corps (USATC) S100 Class. They were delivered to SEK in 1946-1947 and were numbered Δα51-70. Eight have survived the steam scrappings of the 1980s.

Numbers		Location
USATC	SEK	Location
1415	Δα53	Stored Thessaloniki
1999	Δα55	Preserved, Railway Museum of Thessaloniki
4400	Δα57	Stored Thessaloniki.
6013	Δα59	Stored Thessaloniki.
6172	Δα60	Stored Thessaloniki
1310	Δα61	Stored Thessaloniki. Last in service as yard steam cleaner
6008	Δα63	Preserved, Railway Museum of Thessaloniki
1987	Δα65	Stored Tithorea

== Gallery ==
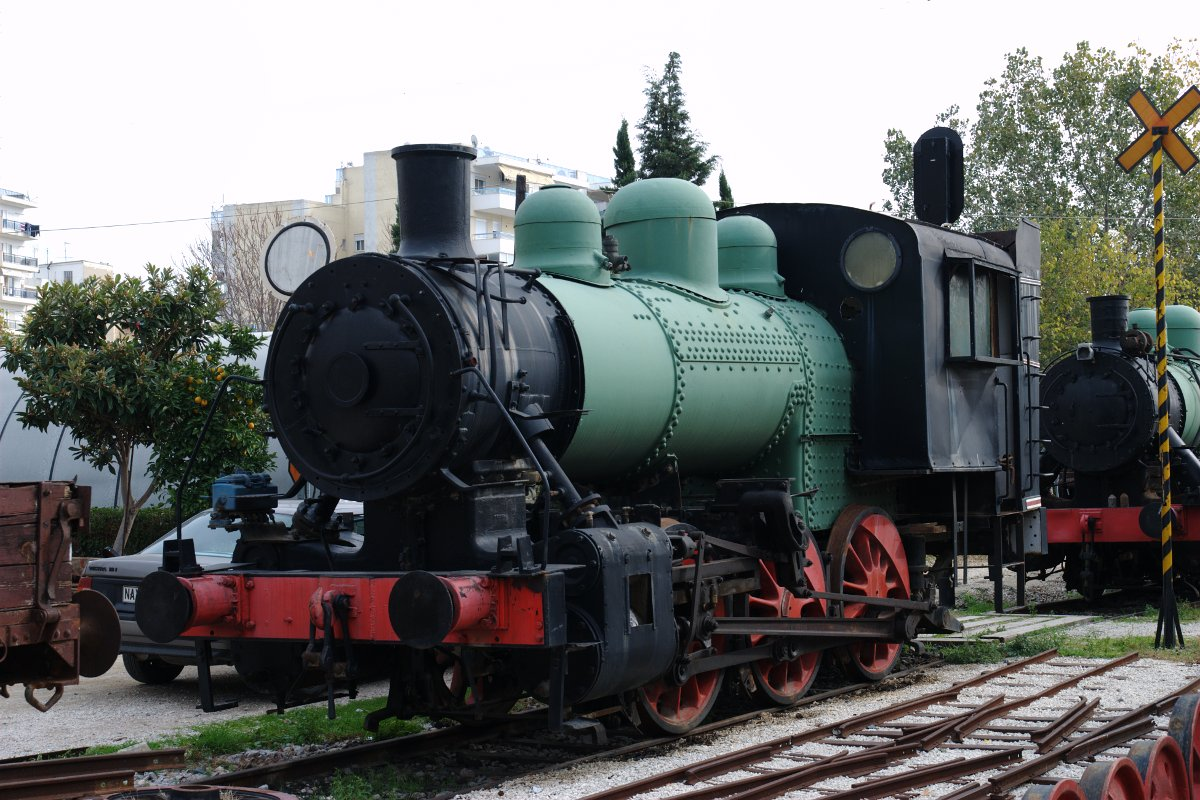

== See also ==
- USATC S100 Class
