= Edvard Grieg oil field =

Norwegian oil field

Edvard Grieg Oil Field
- Country: Norway
- Region: North Sea
- Location: Utsira High
- Block: Block 16/1
- Offshore/onshore: Offshore
- Operator: Aker BP

Field history
- Discovery: 2007
- Start of production: 2015

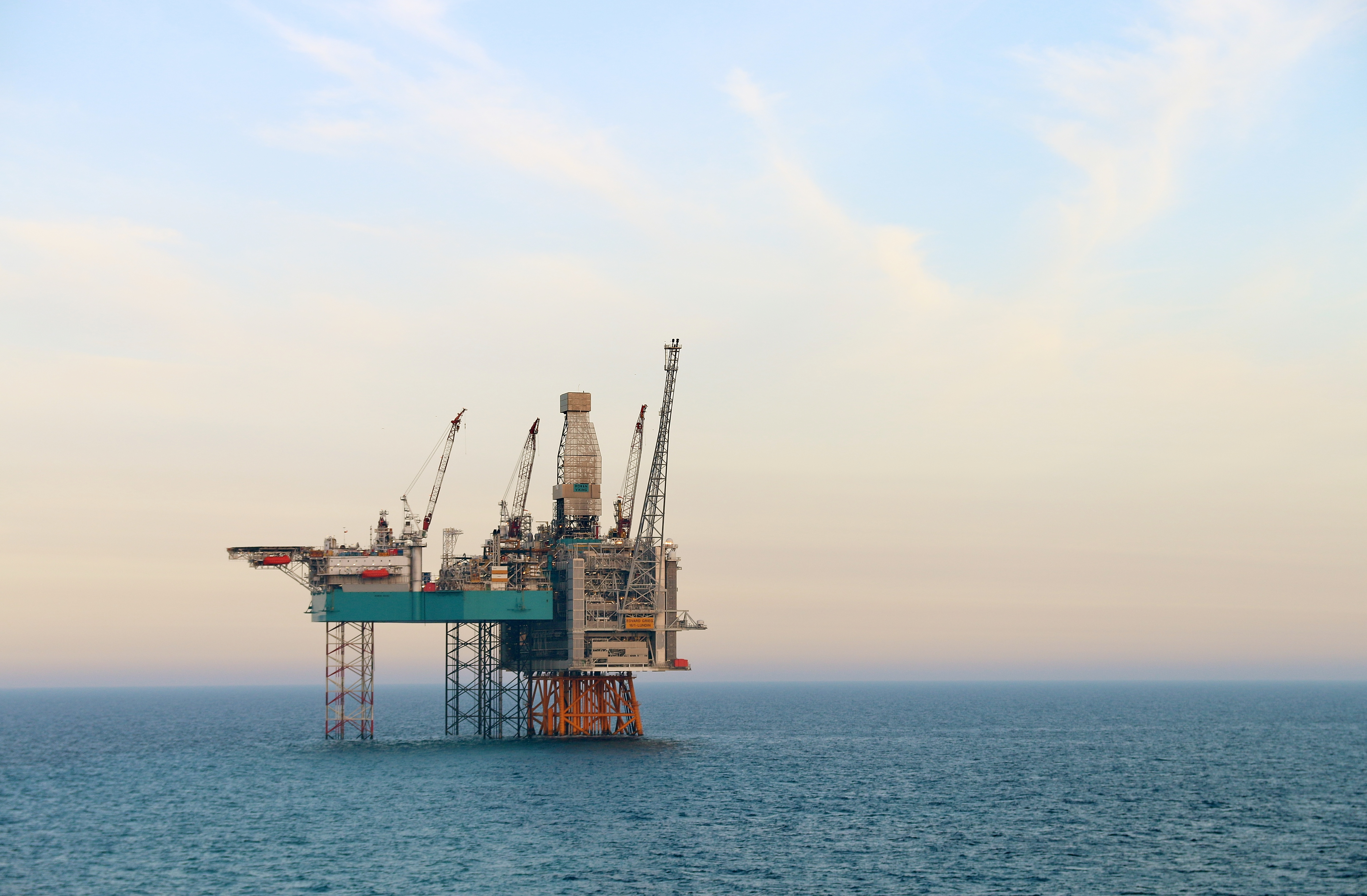
A platform on the Edvard Grieg oil field. Photo: Øyvind Knoph Askeland

The Edvard Grieg oil field (known until 2012 as Luno oil field) is an oil field on the Utsira High. It was discovered in 2007 and expected to hold around 150 million barrels of oil.

The field is operated by Aker BP who has 50% share of ownership, while the rest is shared between OMV (20%), Statoil (15%) and Wintershall (15%).

Production commenced in November 2015. Oil is recovered using pressure from water injection. It is transported by pipeline to the Sture terminal on the Norwegian mainland. Gas is also extracted and transported through a different pipeline to Great Britain.

The reservoir is located 1,900 meters deep and is formed by a conglomerate from the Late Triassic to Early Cretaceous.

The field is named after Norwegian composer and pianist Edvard Grieg.

== See also ==
- List of oil fields
