= Lucara Diamond =

Canadian mining company

Lucara Diamond Corp.
- Type: Public company
- Traded as: TSX: LUC
- Industry: Mining
- Founded: 2009; 17 years ago
- Headquarters: Suite 2000 885 West Georgia Street, Vancouver, BC, Canada
- Key people: Lukas Lundin (Chairman); William Lamb (President and CEO)
- Products: Diamonds
- Revenue: $265 million (2014)
- Operating income: $191 million (2014)
- Net income: $45 million (2014)
- Total assets: $317 million (2014)
- Total equity: $228 million (2014)
- Parent: Lundin Group of Companies
- Website: www.lucaradiamond.com

Lucara Diamond Corp. is a diamond exploration and mining company, founded in 2009 by two Canadian mining executives, Eira Thomas, Catherine McLeod-Seltzer, and Swedish-Canadian mining billionaire Lukas Lundin, operating in Southern Africa but established in Canada. In August 2024, the world's second largest gem-quality diamond ever found, was found at the Karowe mine in Botswana.

== Operations ==
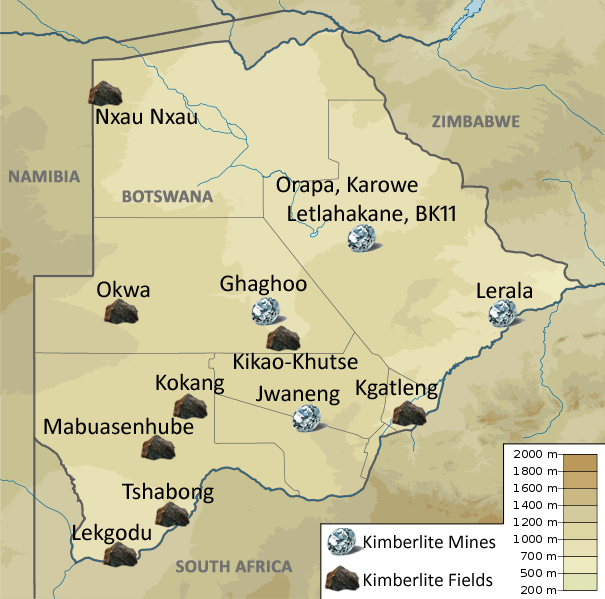
Diamond mines and kimberlite fields in Botswana

Lucara owned a 40% share of the AK6 kimberlite project (now the Karowe mine) in Botswana. In October 2010, Lucara bought African Diamonds, giving it a 100% share in the mine. The mine has an estimated US$2.2 billion of diamonds. AK6 is in the Orapa/Letlhakane district.

Other operations include the Mothae diamond project in Lesotho, where kimberlite processing began in June 2010, and where a 53.5 carat diamond has already been discovered; the Kavango project in Namibia; and planned mines and applications for mining licenses in Zimbabwe, Cameroon, and Botswana.

== Noted stones ==
On 18 November 2015, the company announced the discovery of the Lesedi La Rona. At the time of discovery, it was the world's second largest gem-quality diamond ever (second only to the 3,106 carat Cullinan). The type IIa diamond was found in the company's Karowe mine in north-central Botswana. The diamond weighs 1,111 carat and measures 65 by 56 by 40 mm (2.6 by 2.2 by 1.6 in). A day later, two more diamonds weighing 813 and 374 carat, were also found. All the stones came from the AK6 pipe opened 18 months earlier, it has since yielded over 1 million carats of diamonds. The company has sold the 813 carat Constellation in May 2016 for $63.1 million and a 341.9 carat diamond in July 2015 for $20.6 million. The Lesedi has since sold for $53 million.

The Lesedi was later surpassed as the world's second largest diamond by a 2,492-carat piece that was also discovered at the Karowe mine in August 2024.

== Company structure ==
Chairman of the board from 2010 to 2022 was Lukas Lundin, son of Adolf H. Lundin the founder of Lundin Mining and Lundin Petroleum. The president and CEO of Lucara was Eira Thomas from 2018-2023. She stepped down in 2023.

As of January 2020 over half of the company's executives, in Botswana and around the world, were women.

In March 2011, Lucara was reported to be discussing a merger with Gem Diamonds.

After the discovery of the Lesedi La Rona, the company's shares increased by 28%.

== See also ==
- List of largest rough diamonds
