= Pietro Arrigoni =

Italian architect

Pietro Arrigoni (August 9, 1856 – 1940) was an Italian architect from Milan, mostly known for his work in the city of Thessaloniki in northern Greece.

== Life ==
Arrigoni was born in 1856 in Milan. He studied architecture at the Accademia Reale di Belle Arti, where he won a prize for his Palazzo design.

In 1890 he settled in Thessaloniki. He was hired by the "Compagnie de Tramways et d' Éclairage Électrique de Salonique". In 1894, he designed the city's railway station. Along with the works of Alexandre Vallaury, Arrigoni's project introduced new construction technologies and helped disseminate the use of concrete and iron structures in the Ottoman Empire. Among his works in the city are also Villa Bianca, Villa Achmet Kapanci, Villa Mechmet Kapanci, Aslanian mansion, the old building of the Ippokrateio Hospital (Hirsch), the "Limodon" Hospital (former Regina Margarita), Villa Hirsch, Moskof mansion, the Railway Museum of Thessaloniki and others. He operated also a mine in Chalkidiki.

He temporarily left the city due to the Italo-Turkish War and returned in 1912. In 1921 he founded an architectural office with his son, and between 1923 and 1926 he designed a settlement for Greek refugees.

Arrigoni died in 1940, when he was murdered by a thief that had broken into his house. He is buried in the Catholic cemetery of St Vincent in Thessaloniki.

The Thessaloniki poet Kostis Moskof was his grandson.

== Gallery ==
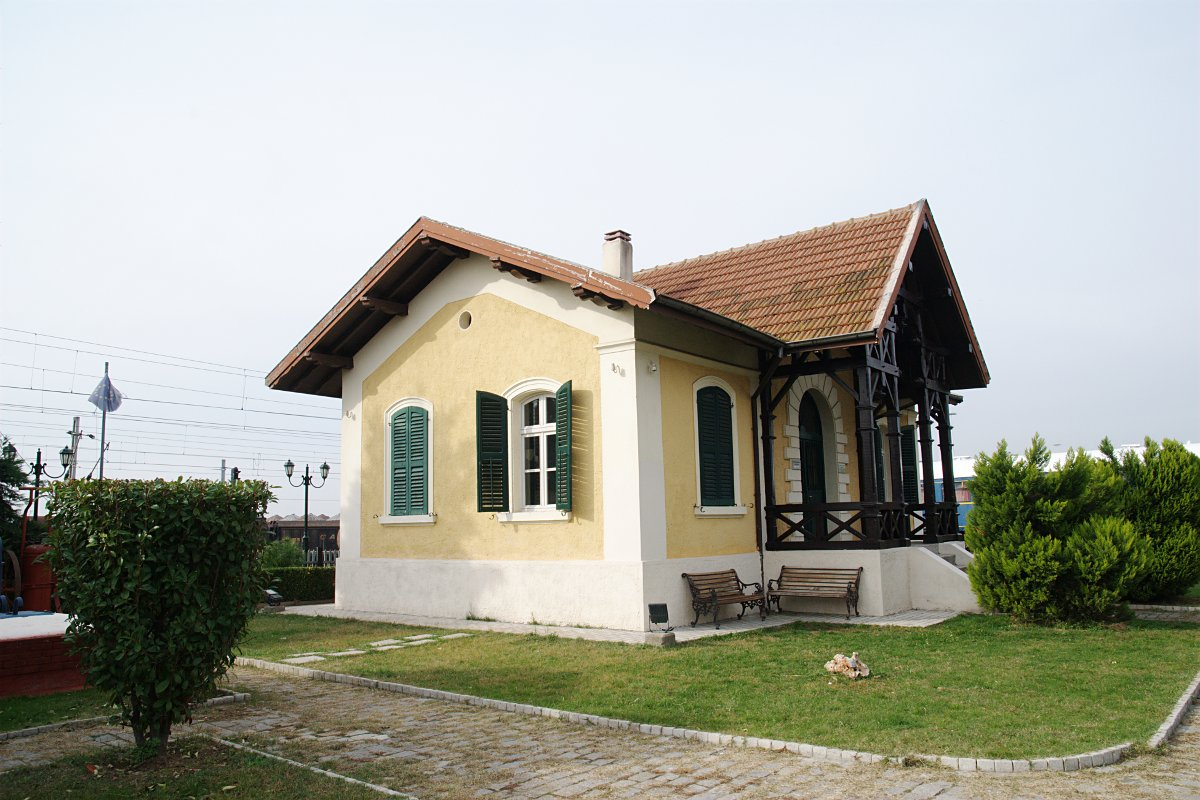
Railway Museum of Thessaloniki

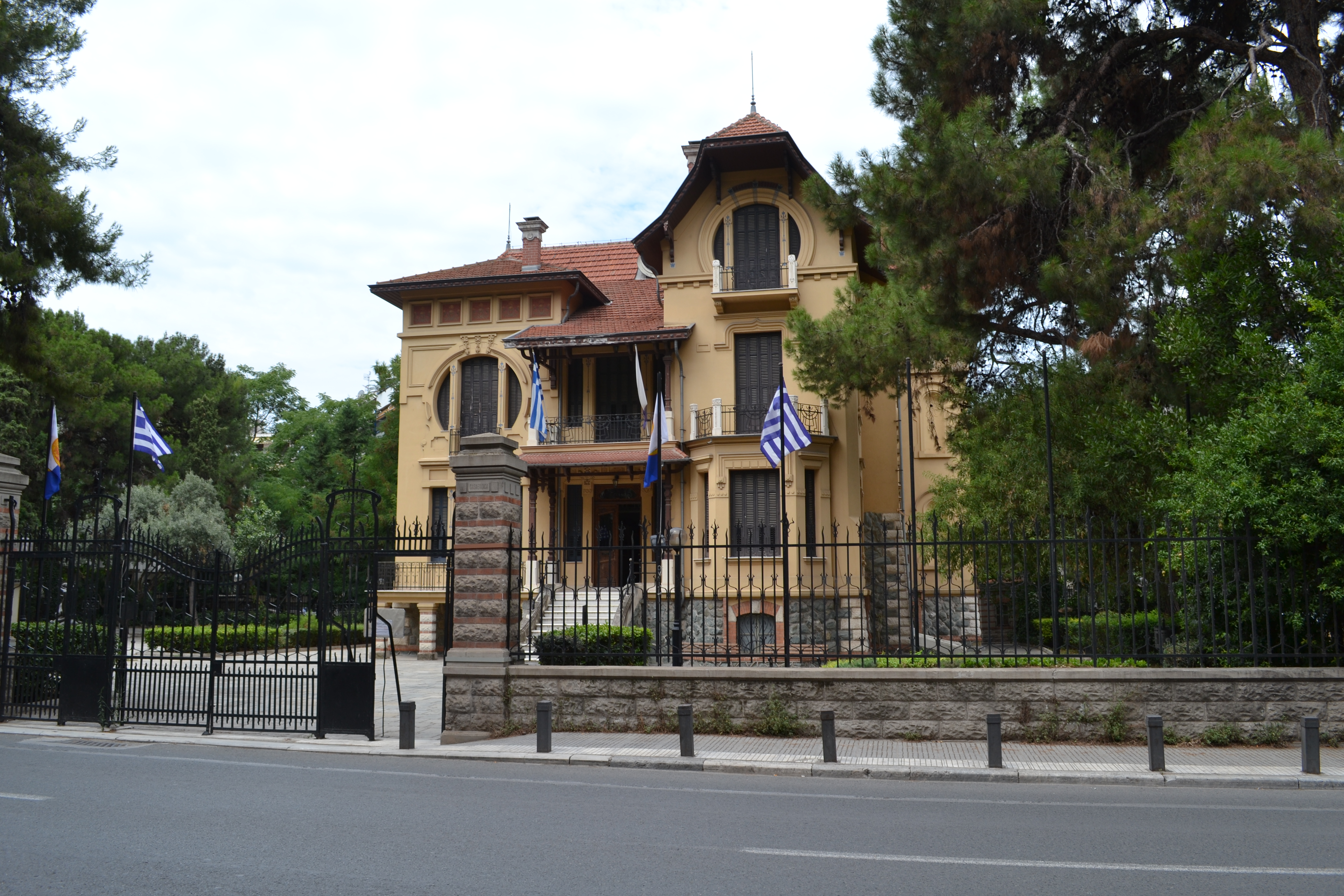
Villa Bianca

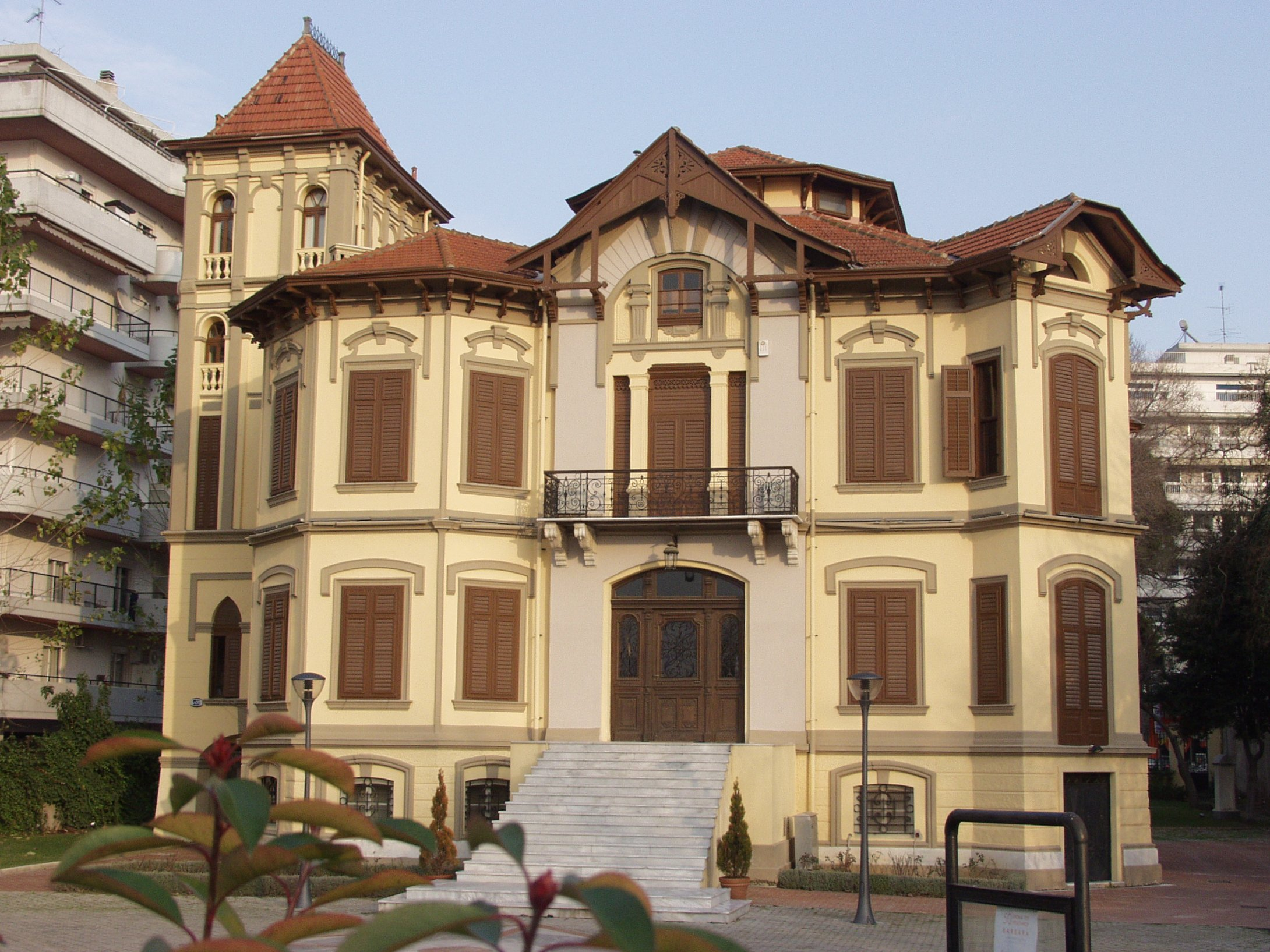
Villa M.Kapanci

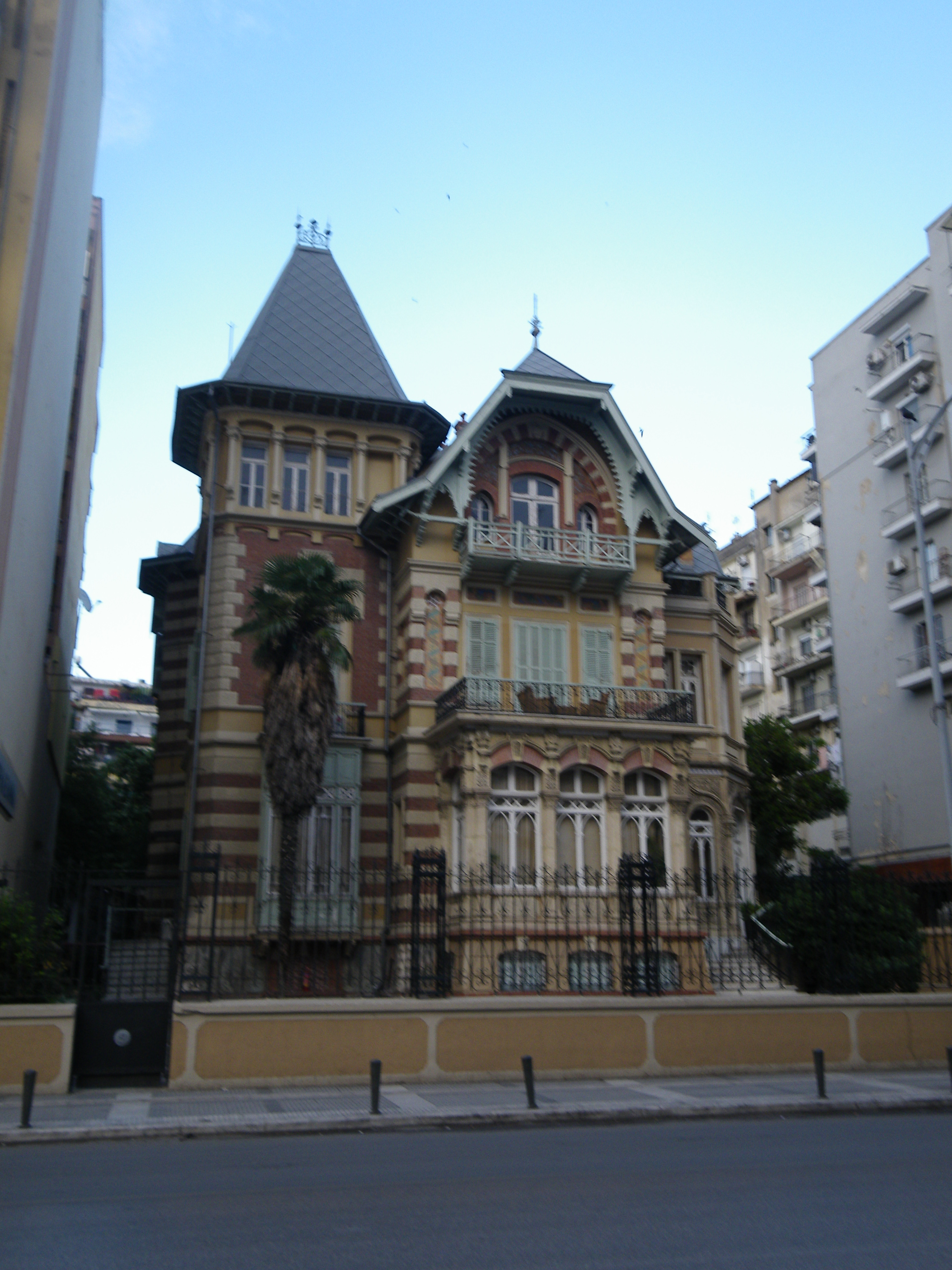
Villa A.Kapanci

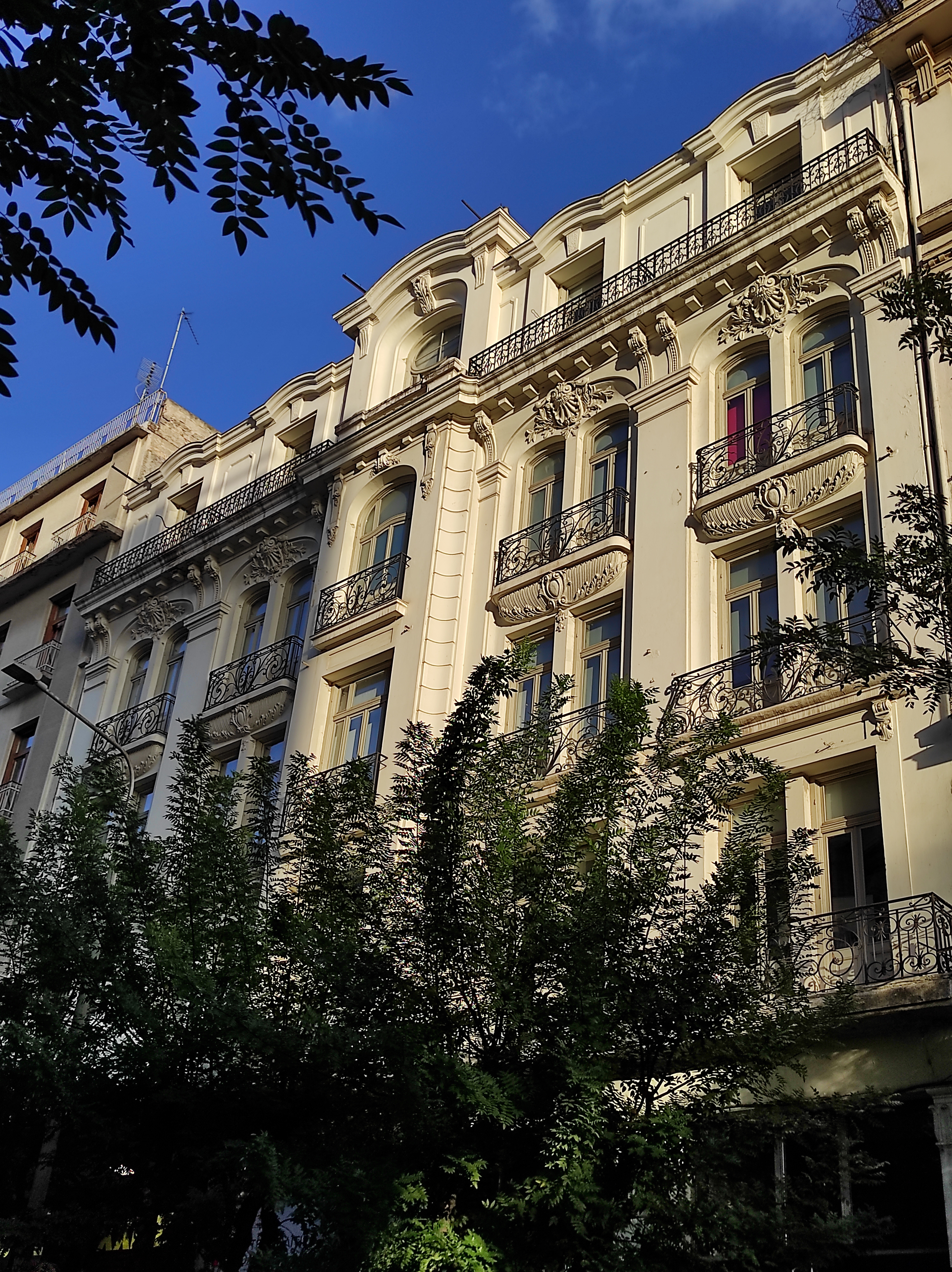
Aslanian mansion

== Literature ==
- L. Tsaktsiras; K. Papanthimou; G. Mantzios; N. Kalogirou, eds. (2004), Thessaloniki. The city and its monuments, Thessaloniki: Malliarēs paideia, ISBN 960-239-759-4

== Sources ==
- Στο κρυμμένο καθολικό νεκροταφείο της πόλης
