= Lukas Lundin =

Swedish-Canadian businessman (1958–2022)

- Born: 3 July 1958; Stockholm, Sweden
- Died: 26 July 2022 (aged 64)
- Education: New Mexico Institute of Mining and Technology
- Occupation: Businessman
- Title: Chairman of Lundin Mining
- Children: 4 sons
- Parent: Adolf H. Lundin
- Relatives: Ian Lundin (brother)

Lukas Henrik Lundin (3 July 1958 – 26 July 2022) was a Swedish-Canadian businessman, based in Geneva, Switzerland. He was the chairman of Lundin Mining, Denison Mines, Lucara Diamond, NGEx Resources Inc, Lundin Gold Inc, the Lundin Foundation, and Vostok Gas. He was also the owner of a $100 million superyacht, Savannah.

== Early life and education ==
Lukas Lundin was born in 1958, the son of Adolf H. Lundin, the founder of Lundin Mining and Lundin Petroleum. He graduated from the New Mexico Institute of Mining and Technology in 1981.

== Career ==
Lundin was in charge of International Petroleum Corporation's oil and gas operations in 1982, based in Dubai. From 1990 to 1995, he was president of International Musto Exploration Limited, where he was responsible for the acquisition of the Bajo de la Alumbrera deposit, in a $500 million takeover.

Lundin was the chairman of Lundin Mining, Denison Mines, Lucara Diamond, NGEx Resources Inc, Lundin Gold Inc, the Lundin Foundation, and Vostok Gas.

Together with his younger brother Ian Lundin, who chairs Lundin Petroleum, he had a net worth of at least US $2.5 billion, mostly from commodity-based companies in oil and gas, metals and mining, gold, diamonds, and cattle in Latin America.

Speaking in 2016, Lundin said, "It's a good time to acquire right now", citing in particular possibilities in base metals, and that Lundin Mining should continue expand further, after acquiring the Eagle nickel and copper mine in Michigan from Rio Tinto Group in 2013, and control of the Candelaria/Ojos del Salado copper mines in Chile from Freeport-McMoRan Inc in 2014. Lundin believed zinc was the best bet on a two-five year horizon, and copper and nickel perhaps in the longer term, and that Chile, Argentina and Peru are all places where he was "comfortable doing business".

== Superyacht ==
Lundin owned the $100 million superyacht Savannah, designed by De Voogt Naval Architects and CG Design, and which was built in 2015 at the Feadship yard in Aalsmeer, Netherlands. The yacht uses a single diesel engine, which uses three generators to charge banks of lithium-ion batteries to drive electrically-powered screws, and producing a 30% fuel savings, as it allows a choice between diesel, electric or hybrid modes as needed. The yacht has a crew of 22, and can take 12 passengers.

== Personal life ==
Lundin was divorced, with four sons.

Lundin was based in Vancouver, Canada, for nearly 25 years, before moving to Geneva, Switzerland in 2013, where his brother Ian already lived, and where they commuted to work together from houses on the shores of Lake Geneva.

He competed in the Paris-Dakar rally four times on a motorcycle, and twice climbed Mount Kilimanjaro.

Lundin died on 26 July 2022, after two years with brain cancer.
