= Railway Museum of Thessaloniki =

Railway museum in Thessaloniki, Greece

Coordinates: 40°39′57.28″N 22°53′30.5″E

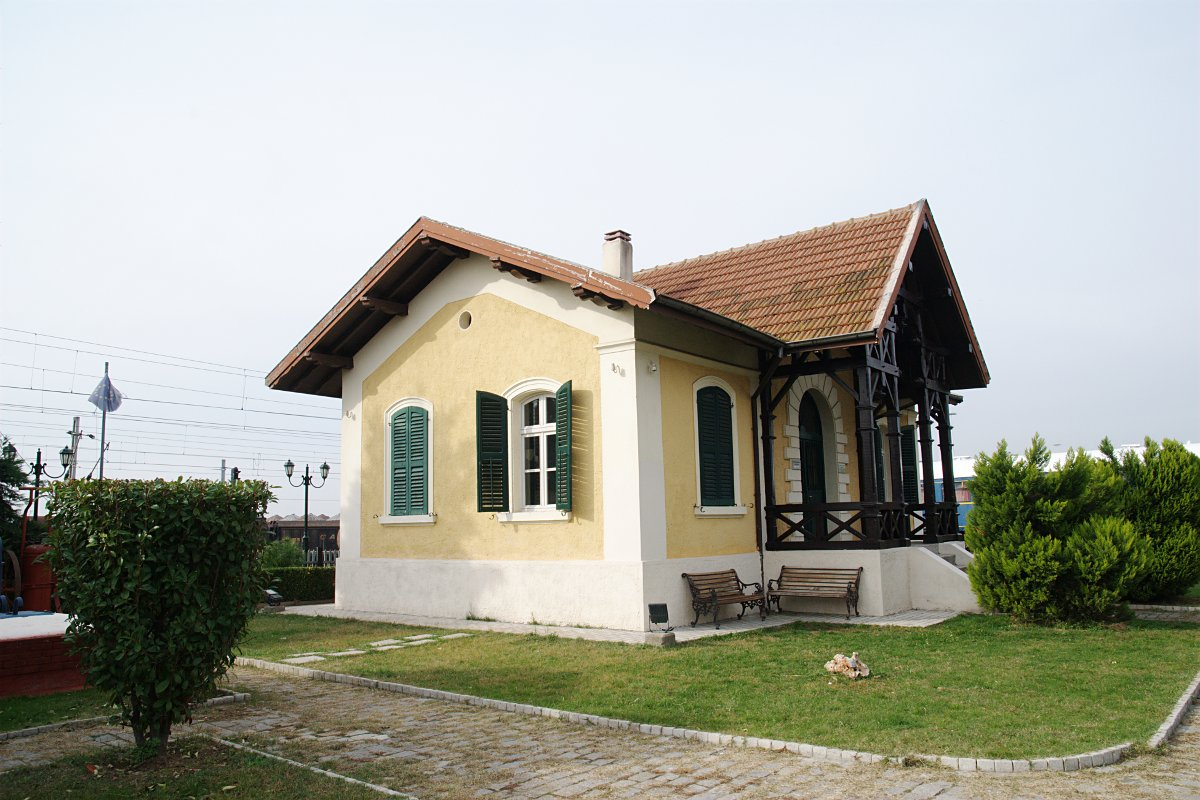
The building of the Military Station (Gare Militaire) of the Jonction - Salonique - Constantinople Ottoman Railway. Recently restored (2001), houses the collections of the Railway Museum of Thessaloniki.

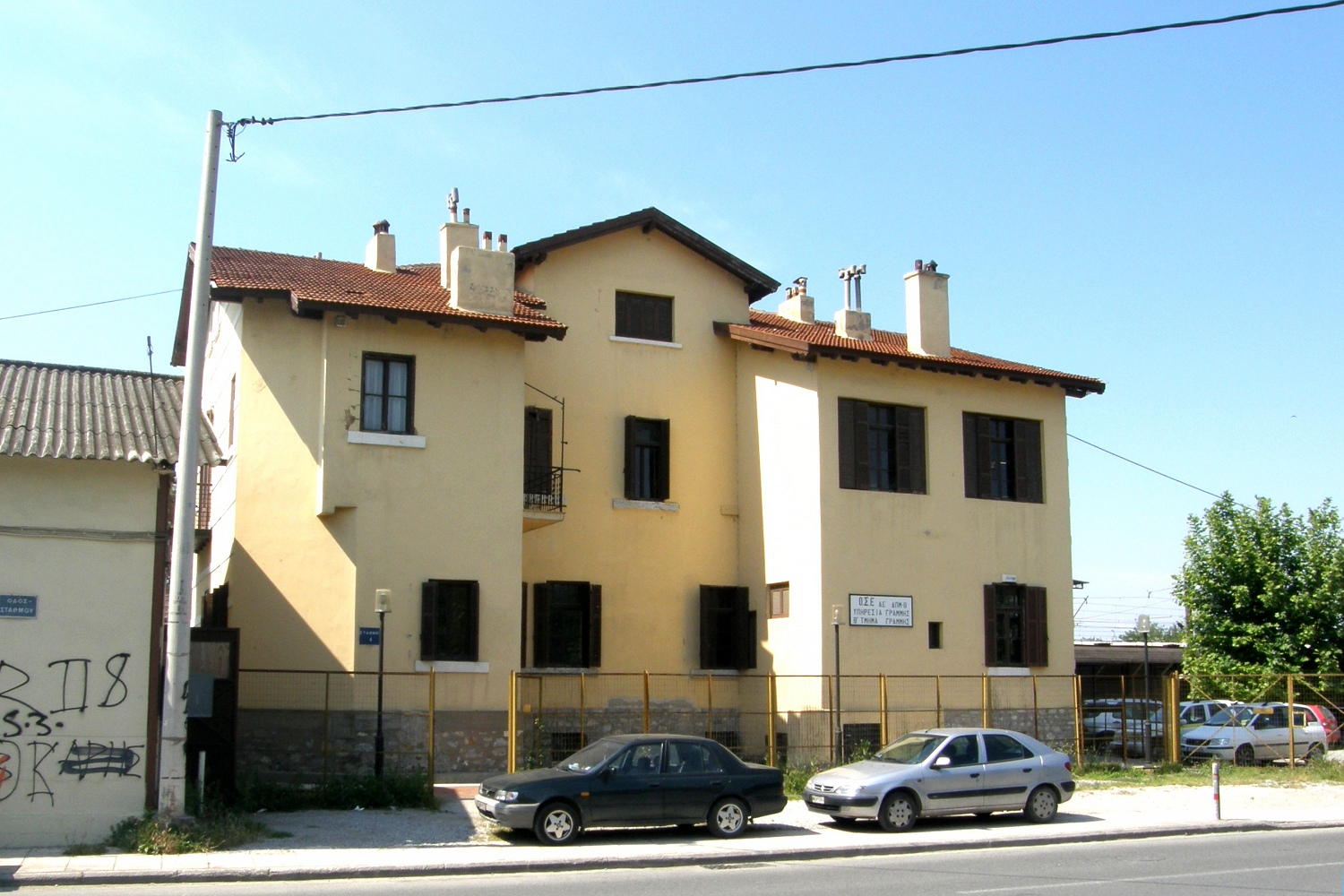
The house of the General Manager of the Oriental Railways (late 19th century), next to the site of the Old Railway Station

The Railway Museum of Thessaloniki is a museum in Eleftherio-Kordelio, a municipality of the city of Thessaloniki, Central Macedonia, Greece. It was founded in 2001 and is housed in the old Military Railway Station A (French: Gare Militaire) of the Thessaloniki-Constantinople Railway (French: Jonction Salonique-Constantinople), near the current TX-3 signalbox. This historic station was built in 1891–1894 by the Italian architect Pietro Arrigoni.

In the station-master’s office inside the station building there is a map with all Greek railway lines marked on it, railway workers’ uniforms, railway workmen’s tools, personal belongings, technical manuals and details of all old steam engines and diesel engines belonging to the Greek railways. The museum is also home to some of the furnishings from the carriages of the former Greek royal family. In the museum courtyard there is a restaurant carriage from the renowned Orient Express, which is open to visitors.

There are plans to put fifteen old OSE engines on display in front of the museum; these engines are at present undergoing reconstruction work. As from the summer of 2002 young friends of the railway can travel to the museum on the children’s train which departs from the new railway station of Thessaloniki.

The museum is open every Wednesday and Thursday between 10 am and 13am, excluding public holidays. Photography is allowed only by advance arrangement.

== Rolling stock collection ==
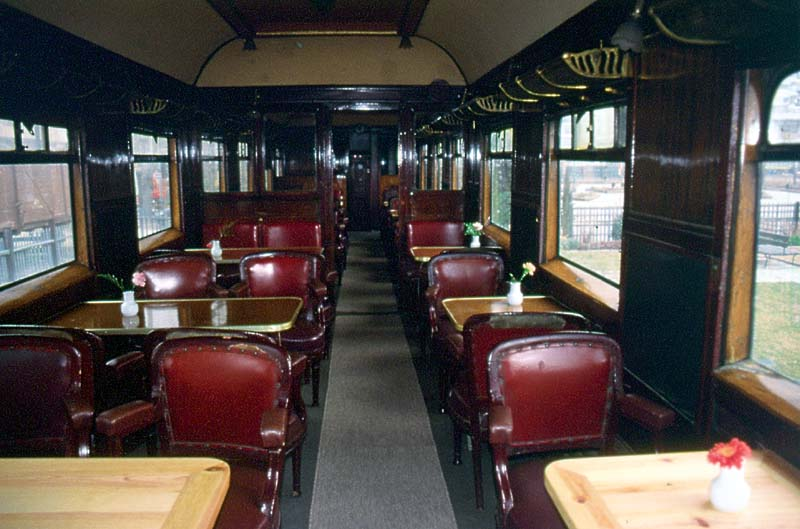
Internal view of Orient Express car

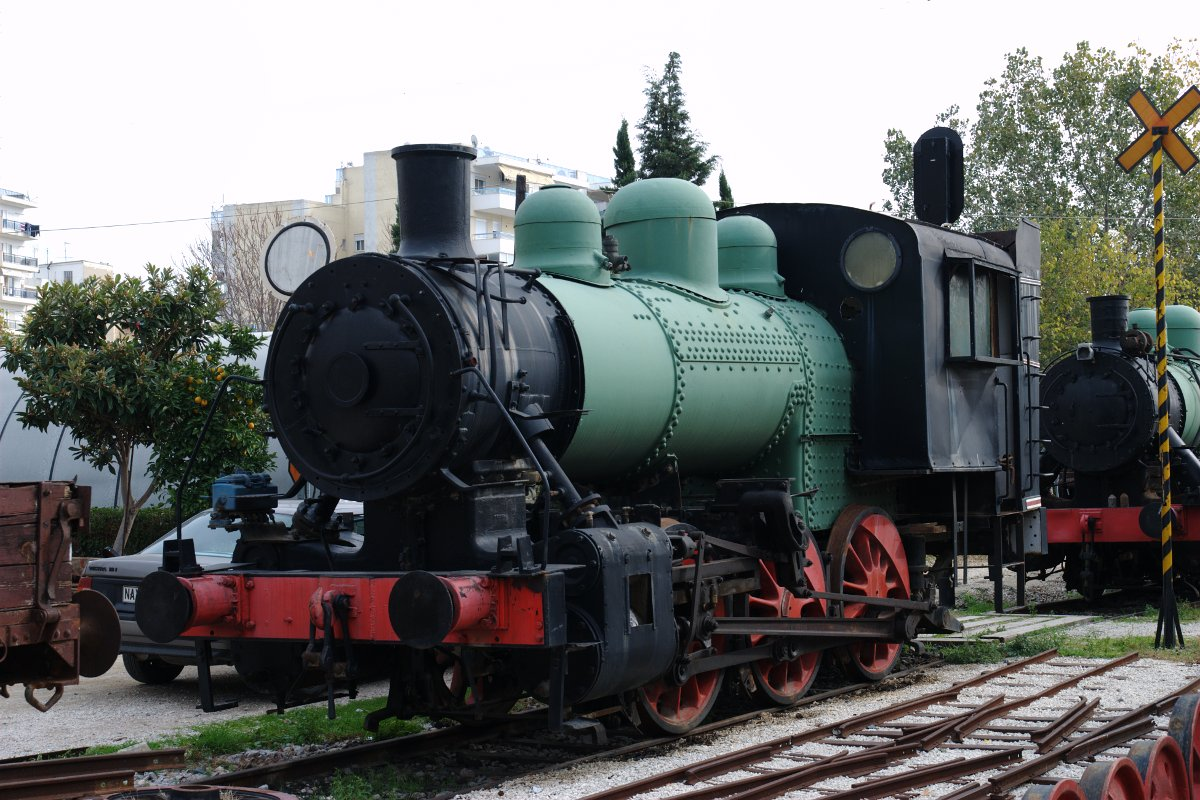
Preserved steam locomotive

The rolling stock collection includes:

- A SEK Class Ζα (De Glehn) 4-6-0 steam locomotive, possibly Ζα306.
- Two SEK Class Δα (USATC S100) 0-6-0T steam locomotives
- A luxury restaurant car used with the Orient Express trains
- A railway crane and an oil-tank car of Piraeus-Demerli-Frontier railway

== Sources ==
- This article incorporates text from the corresponding article at the Museums of Macedonia website, commissioned by the Macedonian Heritage foundation, written by Vlasis Vlasidis, and published under a CC-BY-SA-3.0 license.
