= Red Jacket (disambiguation) =

Red Jacket (c. 1750–1830) was a Native American Seneca orator and chief of the Wolf clan.

Red Jacket may also refer to:

== Ships ==
- Red Jacket (clipper), a 1853 famous clipper ship
- SS Red Jacket, a number of steamships with this name

== Other ==
- an unincorporated town near Calumet, Michigan
- Red Jacket, West Virginia, United States
- Red Jacket (film), is a 1998 documentary film about the life of the world's best-selling artist, Vladimir Tretchikoff
- Red Jacket (poetry), 1955 poetry pamphlet by Paul Goodman
- Red Jacket, a brand of submersible pumps and pressurized line leak detectors made by Gilbarco Veeder-Root
- Red Jacket Firearms LLC, is a firearms company featured on the TV show Sons of Guns
- Red Jacket (lacrosse), Canadian lacrosse player at the 1904 Summer Olympics
