= Andrew Peter Lundin III =

American nephrologist and professor (1944 - 2001)

Andrew Peter Lundin III (1944–2001) was a nephrologist. He was Assistant Professor of Medicine at SUNY Downstate Medical Center.

== Biography ==
He was born in 1944. Despite having a single kidney, he was accepted into medical school at SUNY Downstate Medical Center. He married Maureen Fitzgerald. He died in 2001.

== See also ==
- Andrew Peter Lundin I
