= Cultural Foundation of the National Bank (Greece) =

The Cultural Foundation of the National Bank (Greek: Μορφωτικό Ίδρυμα Εθνικής Τραπέζης, Morfotiko Idryma Ethnikis Trapezis, MIET) is a cultural foundation based in Athens founded in 1966. The Foundation was established under the administration of Georgios Mavros, as part of the 125th anniversary celebrations of the National Bank of Greece, which decided to create a cultural foundation to support the humanities, arts and sciences. After interruption during the Greek military junta of 1967–1974, the Foundation recommenced its activities in 1974, again under the sponsorship of Georgios Mavros, then Centre Union – New Forces leader and Deputy Prime Minister of Greece.

== Historical and Palaeographical Archive ==
Among MIET's principal projects is the Historical and Palaeographical Archive (Ιστορικό και Παλαιογραφικό Αρχείο) on Panagi Skouze St., Athens. The archive aims to establish a microfilm archive of manuscript codices and historical archives from Greek-speaking lands, conduct research and provide information for the study of Greek manuscripts and palaeography. The project includes musical manuscripts. The director is Dr. Agamemnon Tselikas, who worked on the deciphering of the Antikythera Mechanism.

== See also ==
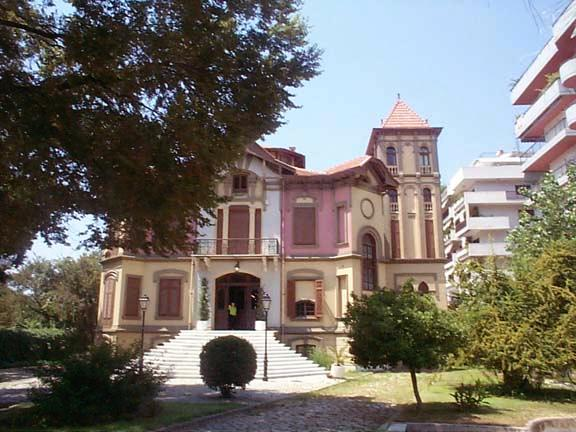
The Cultural Center in Thessaloniki

- National Bank Museum of the Cultural Center of Northern Greece
