= Greenjackets =

Green jackets or Greenjackets may refer to:

Military formations:

- Rifle Brigade (Prince Consort's Own), a British skirmisher brigade formed in the Napoleonic Wars, colloquially known as the greenjackets due to the use of early camouflage
- Green Jackets Brigade, an administrative formation of the British Army from 1948 to 1968
- Royal Green Jackets, the modern descendant of several light infantry and rifles units

In sports:

- Green jacket, a prize awarded to the golfer who wins the Masters Tournament
- Augusta GreenJackets, a minor league baseball team based in Augusta, Georgia
- Green Jackets Ground, a cricket ground in St Cross, Winchester, Hampshire
