= Front-end loading =

Project development methodology

Front-end loading (FEL), also referred to as Front-End Engineering Design (FEED), Front End Planning (FEP), pre-project planning (PPP), and early project planning, is the process for conceptual development of projects in processing industries such as upstream oil and gas, petrochemical, natural gas refining, extractive metallurgy, waste-to-energy, biotechnology, and pharmaceuticals. This involves developing sufficient strategic information with which owners can address risk and make decisions to commit resources in order to maximize the potential for success.

Front-end loading includes robust planning and design early in a project's lifecycle (i.e., the front end of a project), at a time when the ability to influence changes in design is relatively high and the cost to make those changes is relatively low. It typically applies to industries with highly capital intensive, long lifecycle projects (i.e., hundreds of millions or billions of dollars over several years before any revenue is produced). Although it often adds a small amount of time and cost to the early portion of a project, these factors are minor compared to the alternative of the costs and effort required to make changes at a later stage in the project.

It also typically uses a stage-gate process, whereby a project must pass through formal gates at well defined milestones within the project's lifecycle before receiving funding to proceed to the next stage of work. The quality of front-end planning can be improved through the use of PDRI (Project Definition Rating Index) as a part of the stage-gate process.

Front-end loading is usually followed by detailed design or detailed engineering.

== FEL Stages ==
It is common industry practice to divide front-end-loading activities into Five stages. For each stage, typical deliverables are listed given below :

1. FEL 0 - Conceptualization: The costs associated with the FEL 0 stage typically represent a small percentage of the total investment, as they focus on the initial evaluation and identification of the feasibility of the project. It could vary between 1% and 5% of the total investment.
2. FEL 1 - Represents Feasibility Evaluation: The costs at this stage are higher than in FEL 0, but still a relatively small fraction of the total investment. It could range between 5% and 15% of the total investment.
3. FEL 2 - Preliminary Design: As the design stages progress, costs usually increase. It could represent between 10% and 20% of the total investment.
4. FEL 3 - Basic Design: The costs associated with basic design tend to be more significant. It could range between 15% and 30% of the total investment.
5. FEL 4 - Project Execution: This stage usually represents the majority of the total investment, since it involves the construction and start-up of the project. It could represent between 50% and 70% or more of the total investment.

FEL-0	FEL-1	FEL-2	FEL-3	FEL-4
Preliminary evaluation; Identification of the feasibility of the project	Material balance; Energy balance; Project charter	Preliminary equipment design; Preliminary layout; Preliminary schedule; Preliminary estimate	Purchase-ready major equipment specifications; Definitive estimate; Project execution plan; Preliminary 3-D model; Electrical equipment list; Line list	Execution; Detailed Engineering

Another FEL methodology splits the project into four phases:

1. FEL-1: Options Study or Index Engineering. This answers the question, "what are my options to achieve my project goals?". For example, in the processing of nickel laterite ore, it might be possible to build either a pyrometallurgical or hydrometallurgical processing plant. This stage would study both options and recommend the best one based on the specific project requirements.
2. Gate 1: Option Selection. The project owner selects which FEL1 option will be developed further, based on input from their engineers.
3. FEL-2: Feasibility Study or Conceptual Engineering. The selected option is developed up to a pre-defined level of detail not yet sufficient for construction and operation, but enough to develop a cost estimate, a schedule estimate, and to make any critical decisions that will influence the final design of the plant.
4. Gate 2: Approval for Basic Engineering. Based on the conceptual design and cost and schedule estimates, the project owner will decide whether or not to proceed with the plant.
5. FEL-3: FEED (Front-End Engineering Design) or Basic Engineering. The engineering team will now fully design the plant, including the exact specifications for how it will be constructed, commissioned, started up, and operated. The proposed plant will now have a detailed cost estimate and construction schedule.
6. Gate 3: Approval for Construction. The project owner will give their approval for building the plant as designed by their engineers.
7. FEL-4: Project Execution and Detailed Engineering. Materials procurement and construction will begin. This stage includes all activities until the plant is started-up and regular operations begin.
