= Detailed engineering =

Detailed engineering are studies which create a full definition of every aspect of a project development. It includes all the studies to be performed before project construction starts. Detail engineering studies are a key component for every project development across mining, infrastructure, energy, pharmaceuticals, chemicals, and oil and gas sectors.

Detailed engineering is a service which is delivered for example by global engineering companies such as Worley, Morimatsu Industry, Outotec, Hatch, Amec Foster Wheeler, M3 Engineering, Ausenco, SNC-Lavalin, Techint, and Jacobs Engineering.

Detailed engineering follows Front End Engineering Design (FEED) and Basic Engineering previous steps on the engineering process for a project development, it contains in detail diagrams and drawings for construction, civil works, instrumentation, control system, electrical facilities, management of suppliers, schedule of activities, costs, procurement of equipment, economic evaluation and also environmental impacts before starting of construction of a project.

Detailed engineering is used for different stages and purposes in project development worldwide, whether it is a water treatment plant at OceanaGold Didipo gold-copper mine in the Philippines, a processing plant at Hochschild Mining Inmaculada silver mine in Peru, a molybdenum flotation plant at KGHM Sierra Gorda copper project in Chile, detailed engineering is a key component for every project development.
