= Ian Lundin =

Swedish-Canadian businessman (b. 1960)

- Born: 1960 (age 65–66)
- Occupation: Businessman
- Title: Chairman, Lundin Petroleum
- Spouse: Virginia Lundin
- Children: 2
- Parent: Adolf H. Lundin
- Relatives: Lukas Lundin (brother)

Ian Henrik Lundin (born 1960) is a Swedish-Canadian billionaire businessman. He is the former chairman of Lundin Petroleum.

== Personal life ==
Ian Lundin was born in 1960, the son of Adolf H. Lundin, the founder of Lundin Mining and Lundin Petroleum. He and his wife Virginia live in Coppet, near Geneva, Switzerland, and have a son and a daughter.

== Career ==
Lundin was chairman of Lundin Petroleum until 2022.

Together with his older brother Lukas Lundin, he has a net worth of at least US$2.5 billion.

On 11 November 2021, Lundin was indicted in Stockholm District Court for abetting grave war crimes in Sudan, alongside Lundin Petroleum executive Alex Schneiter. The two men are accused of being complicit in atrocities committed by the government of South Sudan between 1999 and 2003, when the Sudanese army forcibly took control of Block 5A to make way for Lundin's oil exploration. Lundin risks a life sentence if convicted. After being charged, Lundin announced he would resign as chairman of Lundin Petroleum at the annual general meeting in 2022.

The trial of Lundin and Schneiter began on 4 September 2023 and was scheduled to last until February 2026, making it the longest trial in Swedish history. Lundin testified in his own defense in December 2024 and January 2025. His responses to the prosecutor's questions were described as "evasive", and he frequently claimed not to remember incriminating details.
