= Adolf H. Lundin =

Swedish entrepreneur

- Born: Adolf Henrik Lundin; 19 December 1932; Sweden
- Died: 30 September 2006 (aged 73); Geneva, Switzerland
- Education: Royal Institute of Technology; International Institute for Management Development
- Occupations: Oil and mining entrepreneur
- Known for: Founding Lundin Mining and Lundin Petroleum
- Spouse: Eva Wehtje
- Children: 4 including Lukas Lundin; Ian Lundin

Adolf Henrik Lundin (19 December 1932 – 30 September 2006) was a Swedish oil and mining entrepreneur. From the 1970s through to the 1990s Lundin established numerous natural resource companies both in the mining sector and the oil and gas sector, which in turn made a number of significant discoveries in the Middle East, Africa, Europe and South America. Several of these deposits are still producing commercial quantities of oil, gas, gold, copper and other minerals; others are still under development. Lundin made a fortune in the 1970s when he came across huge natural gas fields in Qatar.

== Early life ==
Adolf Lundin earned a master's degree in 1956 from the Royal Institute of Technology in Stockholm. Between 1957 and 1960 he worked as a petroleum engineer for the Royal Dutch Shell Group in South America. In 1961, he earned an MBA degree from the Centre d’Etudes Industrielles in Geneva, Switzerland. Between 1961 and 1966 he was responsible for oil exploration activities in the North Sea and Portugal for the Ax:son Johnson Group. In 1966, he moved with his family to Geneva to work as assistant director of the Centre d’Etudes Industrielles (which later became the International Institute for Management Development).

Adolf's brother Bertil (1946-2005) was head of the Kontoret för Särskild Inhämtning (The Office for Special Collection). The KSI is Sweden's intelligence agency.

== Career ==
In 1971, he started his career as an independent oil and mining entrepreneur on a global scale. His first successful venture was Gulfstream Resources which, in 1976, co-discovered the North Gas Field, offshore Qatar, this field remains today as the single largest known gas accumulation in the world.

Lundin was an ardent anti-communist. In the United States Lundin was involved with the conservative think tank, The Heritage Foundation based in Washington, D.C. (Reagan Doctrine/ Kirkpatrick Doctrine). In 1980, Lundin sponsored Ronald Reagan's election campaign. Lundin and his wife Eva were invited to the Reagan inauguration in 1981. The program included an inauguration party with Frank Sinatra that the couple watched from the front row.

He founded Lundin Mining in 1994.

In 1998, he was named International Swede of the Year by His Majesty the King of Sweden. In 1999, Lundin Oil made a major discovery of oil in the Thar Jath structure in an area in Sudan (Block 5A). In 2000, Lundin invited the former prime minister (1991-1994) and EU envoy to the Balkans (1995) Carl Bildt to join his board of directors. In 2001, Lundin founded Lundin Petroleum.

In 2002, he received an honorary doctorate from Plekhanov Russian University of Economics in Moscow. He became the honorary chairman of Lundin Petroleum AB, the chairman of Vostok Nafta Investment Ltd and a director of North Atlantic Natural Resources AB, Atacama Minerals Corp., Champion Resources Inc., South Atlantic Ventures Ltd, Tenke Mining Corp. and Valkyries Petroleum Corp.

Adolf Lundin died in 2006, aged 73, from leukemia. He and his wife, Eva Wehtje, whom he married in 1957, had four children. His Lundin Group, continued by his sons Lukas Lundin and Ian Lundin. They have invested considerable resources in rebranding the Lundin Group to make it more socially acceptable. They started a philanthropic operation, "Lundin for Africa Foundation", and proclaimed in 2007 to donate $100 million to the Clinton Foundation.

== Books ==
- Adolf H. Lundin: Biography by ULF Lundin Petroleum Giraffetink
- Lundell, Kerstin (2010). Affärer i blod och olja : Lundin Petroleum i Afrika (in Swedish) ([Ny utg.] ed.). Stockholm: Ordfront. ISBN 9789174410198. (Business in Blood and Oil: Lundin Petroleum in Africa)
