= Lundin Energy =

Former Swedish oil and gas company

Lundin Energy AB
- Type: Publicly traded Aktiebolag
- Traded as: Nasdaq Stockholm: LUNE
- Industry: Petroleum
- Founded: 2001; 25 years ago
- Founder: Adolf H. Lundin
- Headquarters: Stockholm, Sweden
- Key people: Nick Walker (President and CEO); Ian Lundin (Chairman)
- Number of employees: 448 (end 2020)
- Subsidiaries: Third Energy Onshore and Viking Oil and Gas
- Website: www.lundin-energy.com

Lundin Energy (former Lundin Petroleum) was an independent oil and gas exploration and production company formed from Lundin Oil in 2001 and based in Sweden with focus on operations in Norway.

Lundin Energy’s oil and gas business was purchased by Aker BP in July 2022 in a deal worth more than US$14 billion. The rest of the company continues to operate as a pure renewable energy business under the new name of Orrön Energy.

Lundin Energy had 107 million cubic metres (671 million barrels) of oil equivalent of proven plus probable reserves at the end of 2020 whereas contingent resources amounted to 44 million m^{3} (276 million bbl). The company's commercial success is overshadowed by a Swedish war crimes investigation into its past operations in Sudan. Chairman Ian Lundin and former CEO Alex Schneiter are the suspects of the preliminary investigation. In April 2020, the company changed its name from Lundin Petroleum AB to Lundin Energy AB.

== Operations ==
Lundin Energy is fully focused on Norway where the company holds 89 licenses. Core areas are the Utsira High Area and Alvheim in the North Sea and the Loppa High in the southern Barents Sea.

In 2010, Lundin Energy discovered the Johan Sverdrup oil field, one of the largest oil discoveries ever made on the Norwegian continental shelf. Lundin Energy has a 20 percent working interest in the Johan Sverdrup oil field development project. Production from Phase 1 started on 5 October 2019 and reached plateau in April 2020, with plateau production of 535 thousand barrels (Mboepd) of oil per day. Phase 2 will add another processing platform to the field centre which is estimated to increase the processing capacity for the full field to 755 Mboepd. Phase 2 is scheduled to start production in 2022.

Another important part of Lundin Energy's production is the Edvard Grieg oil field, located in PL338 on the Utsira High in the central North Sea. The Edvard Grieg field was discovered in 2007 and started production in November 2015. Another production hub is in the Alvheim area, located in the central part of the North Sea, and production from the fields in this hub started in 2008, 2010 and 2015.

Lundin Energy is one of the largest operated acreage holders and has been one of the most active explorers in Norway over the past 10 years. In October 2021, Lundin Energy announced it had acquired an additional 25 percent working interest in the Wisting development, increasing Lundin Energy´s working interest to 35 percent. Wisting is set to be one of the largest development projects in the Barents sea over the next few years.

== Decarbonisation plan ==
Lundin Energy is investing MUSD 800 to achieve carbon neutrality by 2023 from operational emissions. As part of the decarbonization strategy, the company also replaced “Petroleum” with “Energy” in its name.

=== Carbon capture projects ===
To neutralise the residual emissions, Lundin Energy is investing in carbon capture projects. In January 2021 they signed a partnership with Land Life Company, to invest MUSD 35 in reforestation projects capturing approximately 2.6 million tonnes of CO_{2}. Another partnership was signed with EcoPlanet Bamboo in September 2021 where the company will invest MUSD 9 in sustainable bamboo plantations capturing approximately 1.7 million tonnes of CO_{2} over 10 years.

=== Carbon neutrally produced oil ===
In April 2021, Lundin Energy made the world´s first certified carbon-neutrally produced crude sale from its Edvard Grieg field. The field was independently certified by Intertek Group plc (Intertek), under its CarbonClear certification at 3.4 kg of CO_{2}e per boe. '

=== Accusations of greenwashing ===
Lundin Energy's decarbonisation plan has been called greenwashing by environmental organizations. Isadora Wronski, head of Greenpeace Sweden told CNBC in 2020 that “Ridding ‘Petroleum’ from the company name does not change the fact that Lundin is in the oil business and their product is one of the environmentally most harming products there is."

== The Lundin Foundation ==
The Lundin Foundation established and funded by the Lundin Group of Companies. As part of its wider decarbonisation strategy, Lundin Energy currently supports seven start-ups and accelerators in low-carbon technology and innovation through the Lundin Foundation. One of these is Ocean Harvesting Technologies (OHT), a pre-commercial wave energy company that explores the use of wave energy converters (WECs) used to cut emissions from oil and gas production at sea. Lundin Energy is currently involved in a project with OHT on its Edvard Grieg field, to explore the potential of using wave energy to decarbonise production of oil and gas on platforms. If successful, it could be used to decarbonise platforms far from shore.

Lundin Energy also supports Evoy, a company that develops 100% electric motor systems for high-speed boats which has the potential of reducing emissions in the boating industry. Lundin Energy further support Katapult Climate with its Climate Accelerator Program that targets innovative tech entrepreneurs that advance zero and low carbon solutions at scale.

== History ==
Lundin has been involved in oil exploration and production for over thirty years. Lundin Petroleum can trace its roots back to the early eighties in the form of International Petroleum, then International Petroleum Corporation, followed by Lundin Oil in the late nineties before emerging as Lundin Petroleum in 2001 and becoming Lundin Energy in 2020.

The company was formed in 2001 following the takeover of Lundin Oil AB by Canadian independent Talisman Energy, Lundin Petroleum AB is a Swedish oil company traded on the Stockholm Stock Exchange. In the summer of 2003, Lundin Petroleum sold its working interest in Block 5A to Petronas Carigali for US$142.5 million. In 1998 the company discovered the En Naga North and West field in southern part of the Sirte Basin, Libya. After a successful appraisal program in 1998 and 1999 the field was declared. The commercial and development program commenced. Development included the construction of a central production facility, 100 km pipeline together with the drilling of 20 production, 15 injector and 15 water supply wells. Recoverable reserves were estimated to be approximately 100 million barrels (16 million cubic metres) of oil equivalent. In Tunisia, the Oudna field development (Lundin Petroleum 40% working interest) was successfully completed and production commenced in November 2006.

In 2002, Lundin Petroleum acquired Coparex International from BNP Paribas, adding exploration and production assets in France, Netherlands, Tunisia, Venezuela, Indonesia and Albania to the existing portfolio. The acquisition transformed Lundin Petroleum from a pure exploration company into a larger E&P player. In early 2003, Lundin Petroleum entered Norway for the first time by acquiring 75 percent of the shareholding in Norwegian OER oil. In 2004, Lundin Petroleum acquired a portfolio of producing assets in the UK from DNO AS, doubling Lundin Petroleum's reserves to 21.9 million m^{3} (138 million bbl) of oil equivalent and increased production to 4,590 cubic metres (28,900 bbl) per day of oil equivalent.

In April 2010 it demerged its assets on the United Kingdom Continental Shelf into Petrofac's Energy Developments unit to form the stand-alone company EnQuest.

In 2010, Lundin Petroleum made a large discovery on the Avaldsnes prospect in PL501 on the Utsira High in the North Sea, estimated to contain recoverable resources of 16 to 64 million m^{3} (100 to 400 million bbl) of oil equivalent. The discovery was later renamed Johan Sverdrup oil field.

In 2014, Lundin Petroleum made an oil and gas discovery on the Alta prospect in PL609 on the Loppa High in the southern Barents Sea. The discovery is located 20 km northeast of the Gohta discovery well and some 160 km from the Norwegian coast and is estimated to contain resources of 20 to 64 million m^{3} (125 to 400 million bbl) of oil equivalent.

In February 2015, it has started drilling exploration well 16/1-24, located in the Gemini prospect of the North Sea. The well is located in PL338C south-west of the Edvard Grieg field, offshore Norway. It will test the reservoir properties and hydrocarbon potential of Lower Paleocene aged sandstones of the Ty Formation. The Gemini prospect is estimated to contain unrisked, gross prospective resources of 14.8 million m^{3} (93 million bbl) of oil equivalent. The Island Innovator semi-submersible drilling rig will be used to drill the well to a planned total depth of 2,192m below mean sea level. The Gemini exploration well was completed as a dry well in March 2015.

In 2015, three field developments were completed and started production: the Bøyla field and the Edvard Grieg oil field in Norway and the Bertam field in Malaysia.

In April 2017, Lundin Petroleum spun-off its producing assets outside of Norway into a new company called International Petroleum Corporation (IPC). Following the spin-off, Lundin Petroleum is a fully Norway focused company.

Following the approval by the AGM 2020, the company changed its name from Lundin Petroleum to Lundin Energy, to better reflect its decarbonization strategy and broadening of its energy mix.

== Leadership ==
Founder Adolf H. Lundin also founded Lundin Mining in 1994. Lundin died in 2006 at the age of 73. In June 2015, Alex Schneiter was appointed president and chief executive officer of Lundin Petroleum, effective October 2015. The Company announced the appointment of Nick Walker as the company's new president and CEO In August 2020, effective 1 January 2021.

== Accusations of complicity in war crimes ==
In her book Affärer i blod och olja: Lundin Petroleum i Afrika (Business in blood and oil: Lundin Petroleum in Africa) journalist Kerstin Lundell claims that the company had been complicit in several crimes against humanity, including death shootings and the burning of villages.

In June 2010, the European Coalition on Oil in Sudan (ECOS) published the report Unpaid Debt, which called upon the governments of Sweden, Austria and Malaysia to look into allegations that the companies Lundin Petroleum, OMV, and Petronas have been complicit in the commission of war crimes and crimes against humanity whilst operating in Block 5A, South Sudan (then Sudan) between 1997 and 2003. The reported crimes include indiscriminate attacks and intentional targeting of civilians, burning of shelters, pillage, destruction of objects necessary for survival, unlawful killing of civilians, rape of women, abduction of children, torture, and forced displacement. Approximately 12,000 people died and 160,000 were forcibly displaced from their land and homes, many forever. Satellite pictures taken between 1994 and 2003 show that the activities of the three oil companies in Sudan coincided with a spectacular drop in agricultural land use in their area of operation.

Also in June 2010, the Swedish public prosecutor for international crimes opened a criminal investigation into links between Sweden and the reported crimes. In 2016, Lundin's Chairman Ian H. Lundin and CEO Alex Schneiter were informed that they were the suspects of the investigation. Sweden's Government gave the green light for the Public Prosecutor in October 2018 to indict the two top executives. On 1 November 2018, the Swedish Prosecution Authority notified Lundin Petroleum that the company may be liable to a corporate fine and forfeiture of economic benefits of 3,285 million SEK (app. €315 million) for involvement in war crimes and crimes against humanity. Consequently, the company itself will also be charged albeit indirectly, and will be legally represented in court. On 15 November 2018 the suspects were served with the draft charges and the case files. In June 2020, the Swedish Prosecution Authority announced that the investigation was complete. ‘We believe we have sufficient grounds for a prosecution’, said Chief Prosecutor Henrik Attorps to Dagens Nyheter, indicating a firm intention to take the case to court. Defence lawyers have been filing series of legal requests to end the investigation, that have all been denied by the Courts. In June 2021, the prosecutor wrote to the District Court of Stockholm that he planned to finish the investigation before July.

The Lundin case raises the issue of access to remedy and reparation for victims of human rights violations linked with business activities. Lundin Energy now endorses the UN Guiding Principles on Business and Human Rights, acknowledging the duty of business enterprises to contribute to effective remedy of adverse impact that it has caused or contributed to. In May 2016, representatives of communities in Block 5A claimed their right to remedy and reparation and called upon Lundin and its shareholders to pay off their debt. The company has denied responsibility and therefore has not yet provided remedies and reparations to the victims.

The company has never refuted publicly reported incriminating facts. Nor has it substantiated its claim that its activities contributed to the improvement of the lives of the people of Sudan. It never showed an interest in the consequences of the oil war for the communities in its concession area. A shareholder proposal to adopt a human rights friendly legal strategy that takes into account the victims' right to access to justice and prompt redress, was almost unanimously rejected by the 2021 Annual General Meeting of the company. The company maintains a website about its activities in Sudan, as well as one that is dedicated to the criminal case.

Criticism has also been directed towards former Minister for Foreign Affairs Carl Bildt, a former board member for the company, responsible for ethics. Ethiopia arrested the two Swedish journalists Johan Persson and Martin Schibbye and held them for 14 months before releasing them. Conflict Ethiopian Judicial Authority v Swedish journalists 2011 was caused as the journalist studied report of human rights violation in the Ogaden in connection with activities of Lundin Petroleum.

As a corporation, Lundin has not yet been charged criminally. A criminal trial of this nature against Lundin would become a landmark case because of the novelty and complexity of the legal issues that the Swedish court will have to decide. On 23 May 2019, the T.M.C. Asser Institute for International Law in The Hague organized a Towards criminal liability of corporations for human rights violations: The Lundin case in Sweden.

Thomas Alstrand from the Swedish Prosecution Authority in Gothenburg on 13 February 2019 announced that a second criminal investigation had been opened into threats and acts of violence against witnesses in the Lundin war crimes investigation. They have allegedly been pressured not to testify in court. Several witnesses have been granted asylum in safe countries through UNHCR supported emergency protection procedures. The company has confirmed that its CEO and chairman have been officially informed by the prosecutor about the allegation, noting that it believes that it is completely unfounded. Witness tampering is usually intended to prevent the truth from being exposed in court. The second investigation into obstruction of justice seems to contradict the company's assertions of its good faith cooperation with the war crimes investigation.

On 11 November 2021, top executives Ian Lundin and Alex Schneiter were indicted in Stockholm District Court for abetting grave war crimes in Sudan. They risk life sentences if convicted.

The Dutch peace organization PAX and Swedish NGO Global Idé will provide daily English language coverage of proceedings, expert analyses and comments on the website Unpaid Debt.
