= Göran Lundin =

Göran Lundin (born 1950) is a Swedish author and part-time bus driver from Skellefteå in northern Sweden.

His most famous works are Den svarte generalen (1982) (the Black General, written about Haiti), Busschauffören som försvann (1983) (nominated as best Swedish crime novel that year), and Längs fjällvinden (2007).

In 2008, it was reported that Lundin is one of 103 Swedes potentially being surveilled by the FRA.
