= Andreas Petrus Lundin =

American engineer

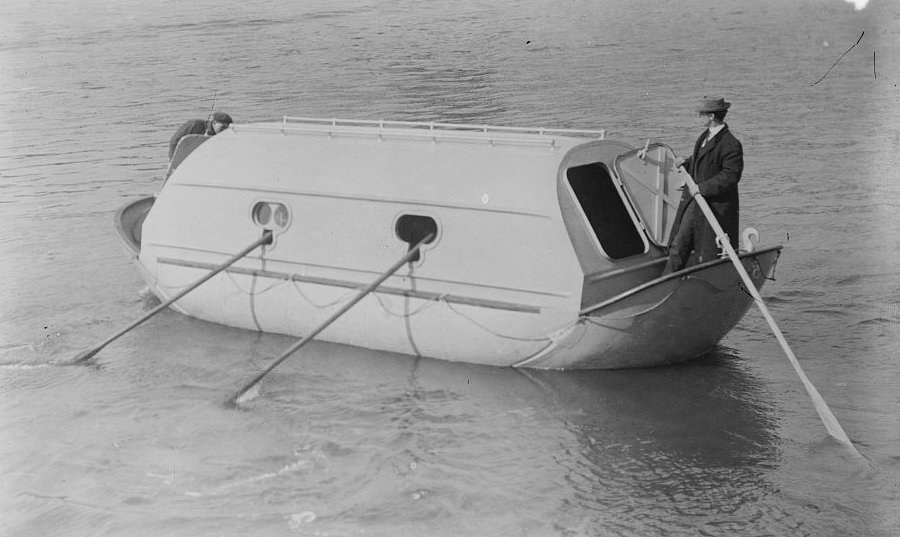
Lundin lifeboat in 1914

Andreas Petrus Lundin (21 July 1869 – August 29, 1929), or Andrew Peter Lundin I, was an engineer for the Welin Marine Equipment Company. He created a series of lifeboats. In 1914 to test his design he arranged to have a newlywed couple cross the Atlantic Ocean in a Lundin Power Life Boat. He died on August 29, 1929.

== Biography ==
He was born on 21 July 1869 in Härnösand, Sweden.

== See also ==
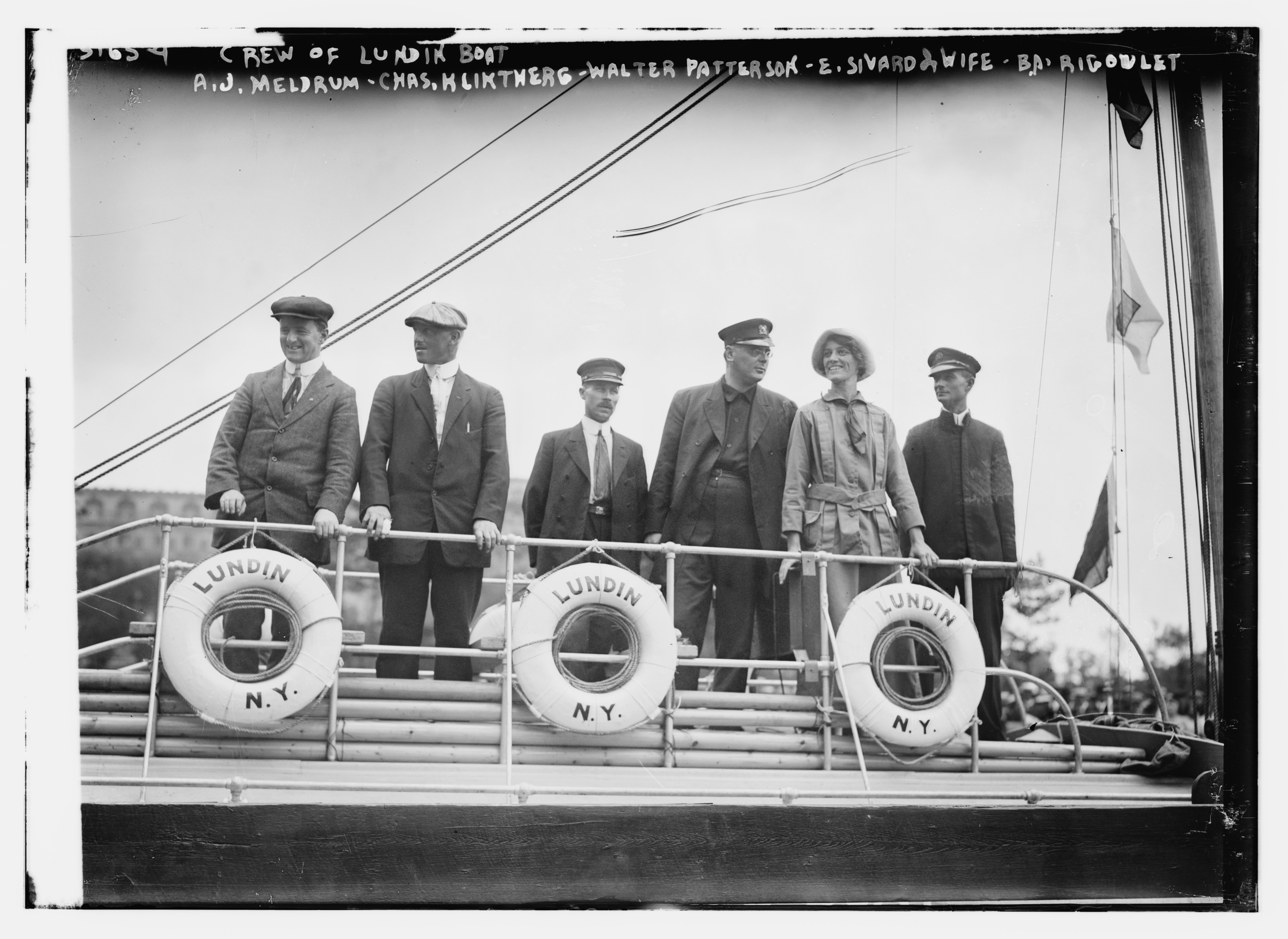
Crew of the lifeboat, 1914

- Andrew Peter Lundin III
