= Vostok Gas =

Investment company

- Type: Public
- Traded as: Nasdaq Stockholm: VGAS SDB
- Industry: Investments
- Founded: 1996
- Defunct: 2012
- Headquarters: Hamilton, Bermuda
- Key people: Lukas Lundin (Chairman of the board), Per Brilioth (Managing director)
- Net income: ▲$950.6 million (2007)
- Total assets: $4.984 billion (2007)
- Number of employees: 8 (2007)
- Website: www.vostokgas.com

Vostok Gas Ltd (named Vostok Nafta Investment Ltd prior to 24 May 2007) was an investment company mainly focused on oil and gas from the former Soviet Union. The company was founded in 1996 and had its headquarters in Bermuda. Almost all Vostok Gas's holdings were American depositary receipts (ADRs) in Russia's Gazprom, which made the company owner of approximately 1.5% of Gazprom. The company was listed on the Stockholm Stock Exchange and was a member of the OMX Stockholm 30 index between July 2006 and January 2009.

At a December 2008 extraordinary general meeting, shareholders approved the liquidation of the company as proposed by the company's board. The board had stated that the market volatility caused by the 2008 financial crisis had removed the attractiveness of a holding company for Gazprom ADRs. During liquidation, shareholders received Gazprom ADRs in exchange for their Swedish depositary receipts in Vostok Gas.
