= Utsira High =

Basement high and horst in the southwest of the Norwegian continental shelf

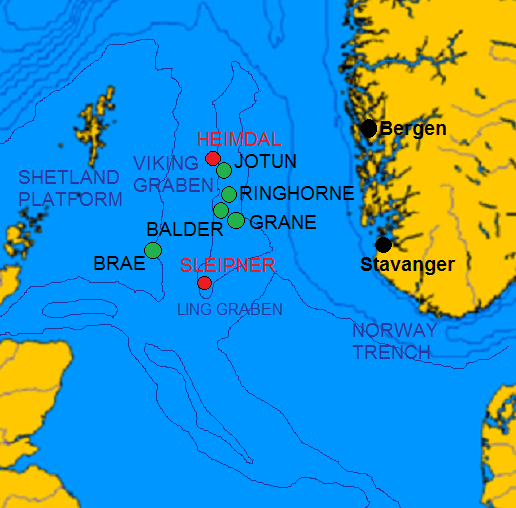
Map showing oil- and gasfields around Utsira High. To the west lies Vikinggraben and east the Norwegian trench.

Utsira High

Utsira High (Norwegian: Utsirahøgda) is a basement high and horst in the southwest of the Norwegian continental shelf. It lies east of the Viking Graben and west of the Stord and Egersund basins 190 km west of Stavanger. It was on the Balder oil field at the flank of the Utsira High that oil was first discovered in Norway in 1967.

The basement is of Utsira High is composed of granite that formed in Ordovician times. Parts of these granites contain saprolite and saprock that formed from weathering above sea level during the Early Mesozoic. before they became buried in Late Jurassic and Early Cretaceous-aged sandstone. These weathered rocks may be unconventional petroleum reservoirs.

The strandflat at Bømlo island is considered a sedimentary rock-free equivalent to the Utsira High.
