= Ulf Lundin =

Swedish artist

Ulf Lundin (born in Alingsås, 1965) is a Swedish artist who lives and works in Stockholm.

Ulf Lundin studied at the School of Photography at University of Gothenburg. He has had many solo exhibitions internationally including shows at Magnus Karlsson Gallery (2008), Thessalonica Center, Greece (2000) and at the Photographers' Gallery, London (1998). His video works have been shown widely including screenings at Lebanese American University, Lebanon (2005), 291, London (2003), Museum of Modern Art, Ljubljana, Slovenia (1999).

Participated in the exhibition Cut my legs off and call me shorty! at Tensta Konsthall summer 2009.
