= Geology of China =

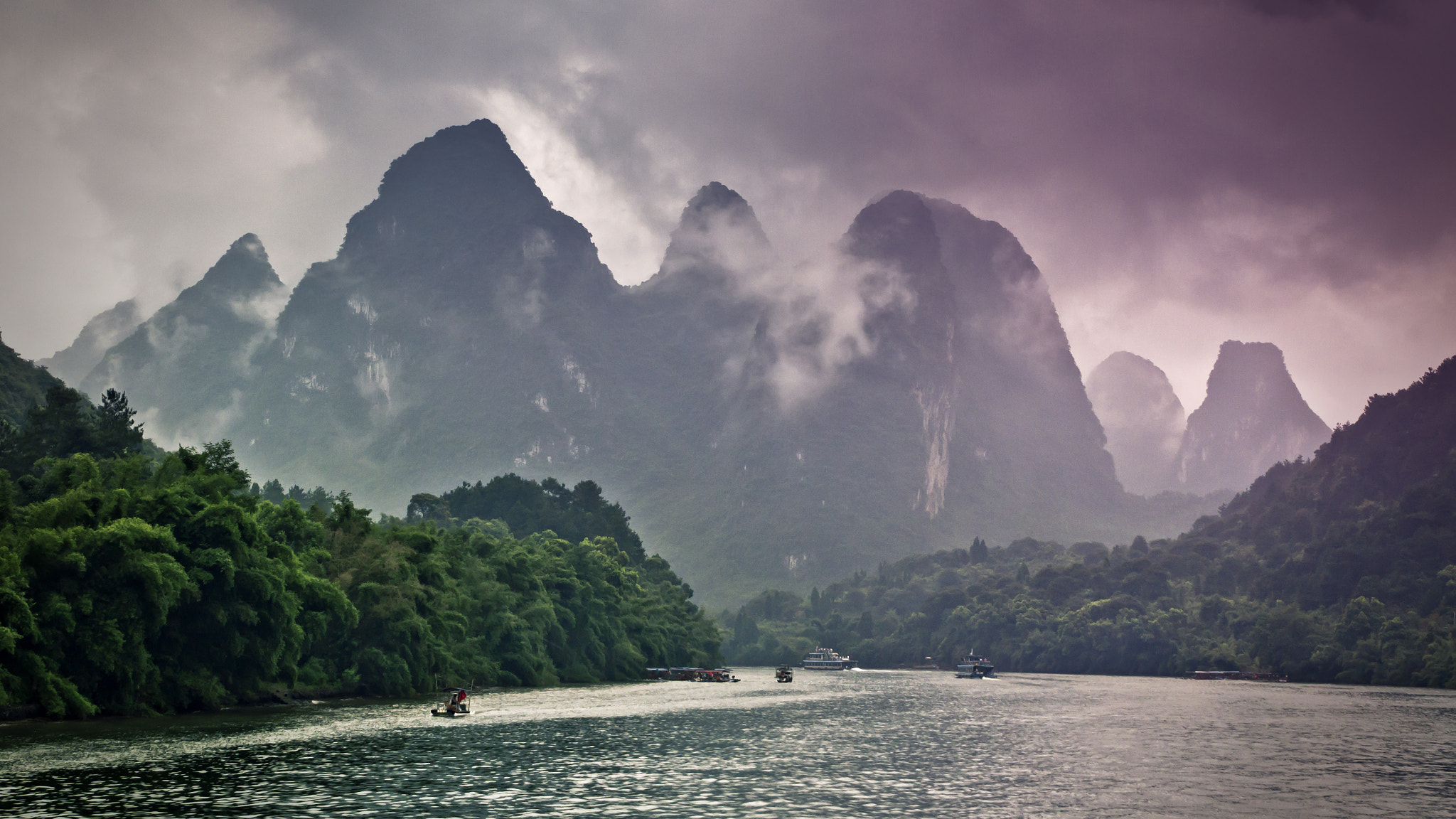
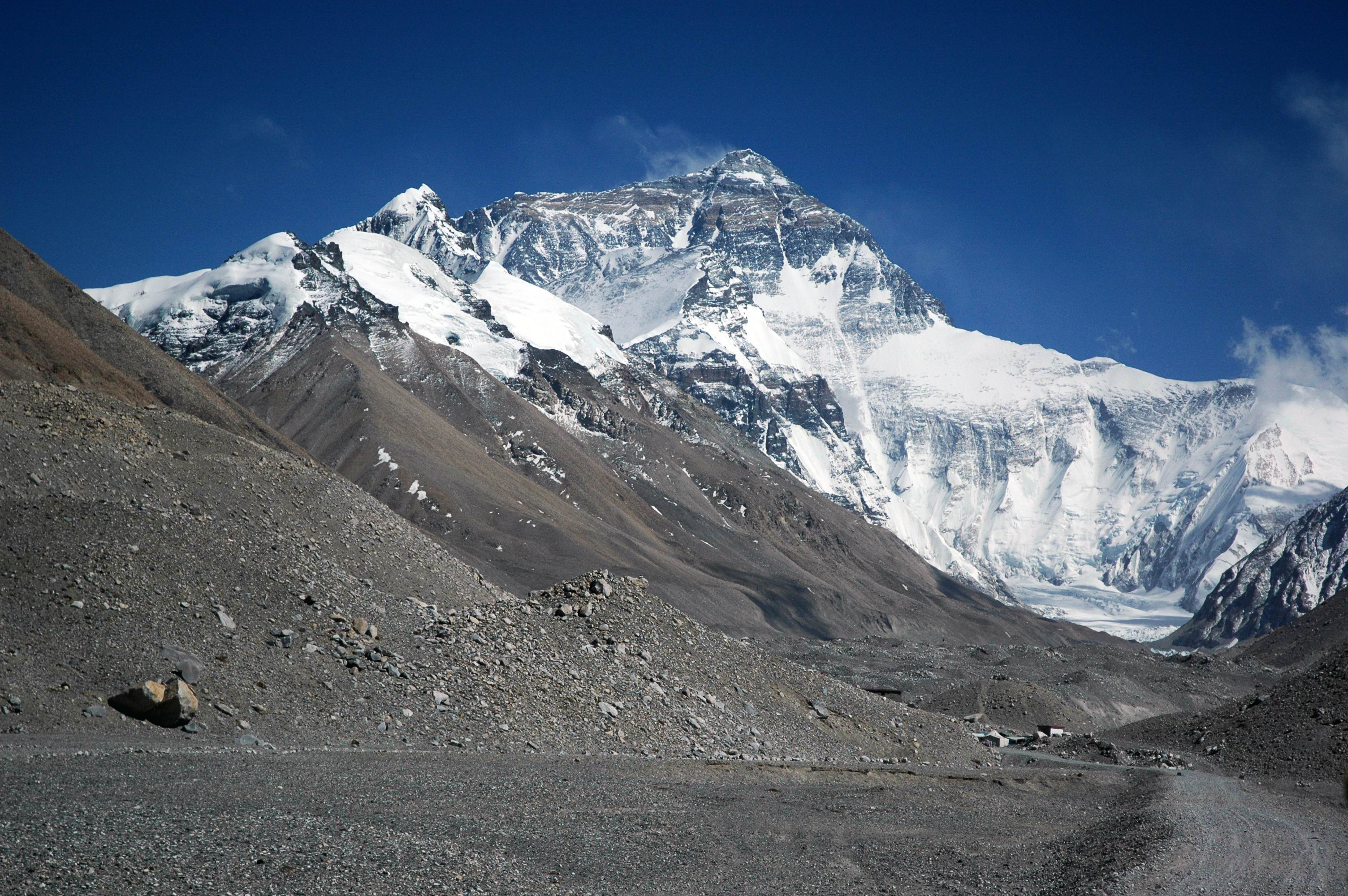
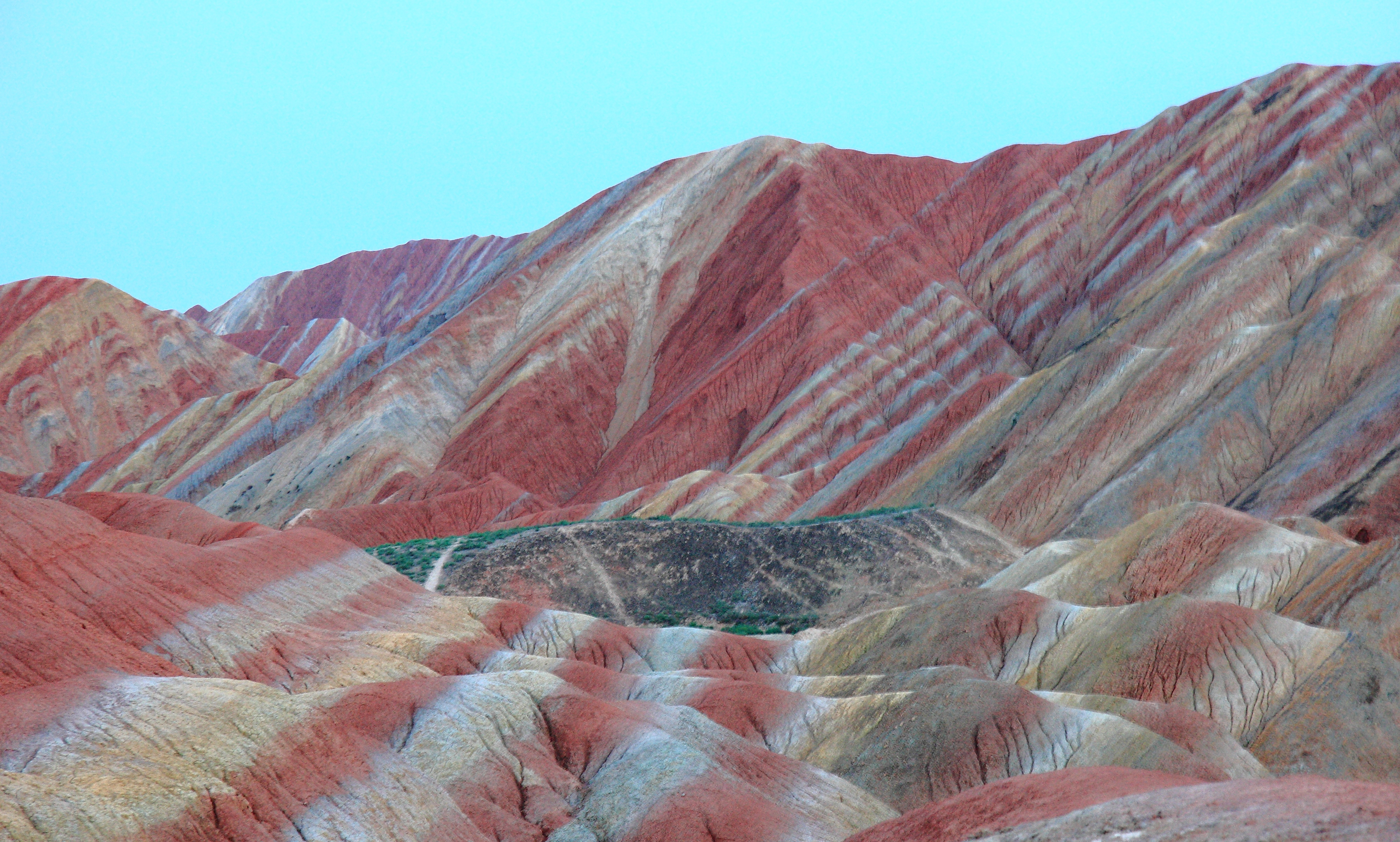
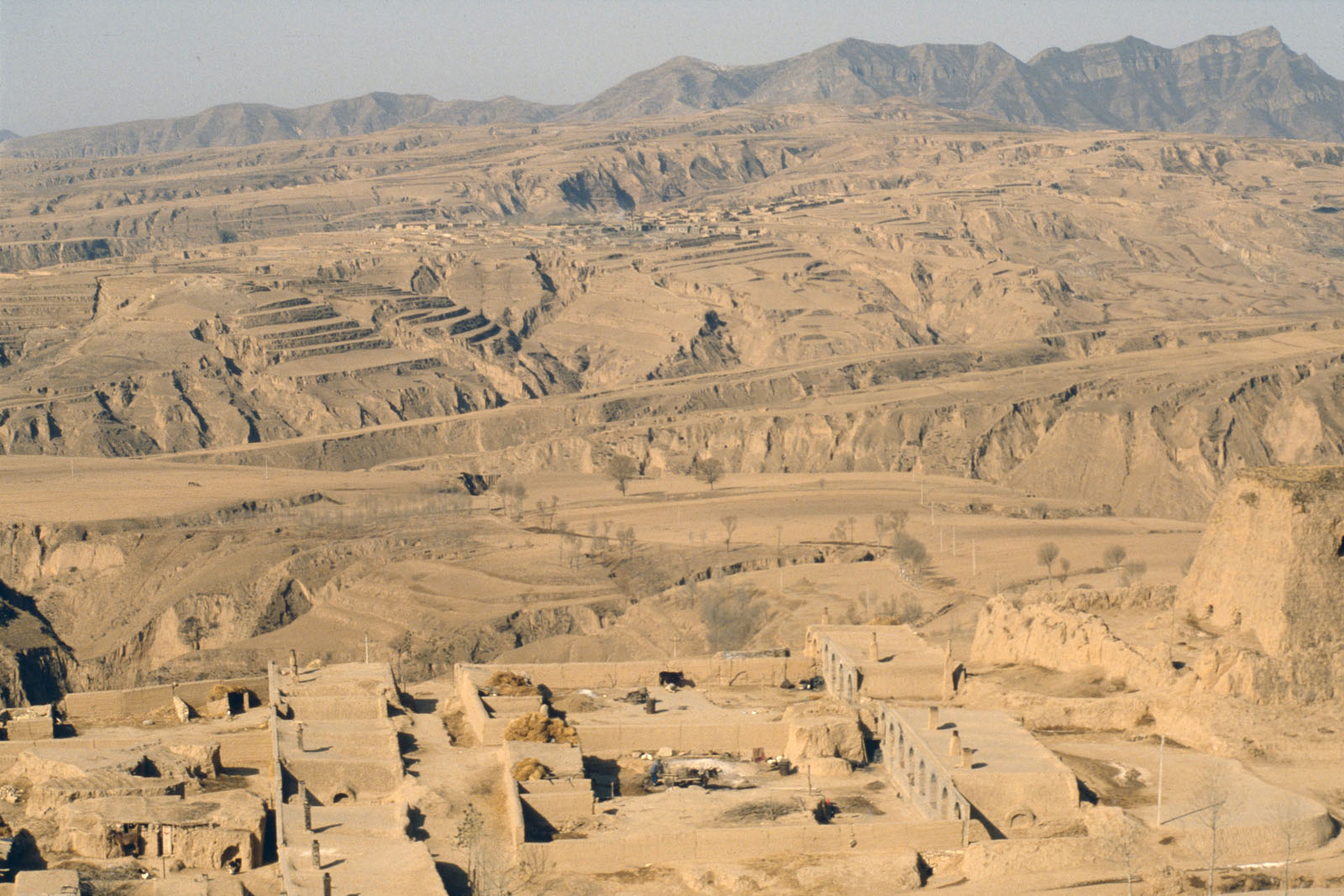
Clockwise from upper left: Li River karst, Mount Everest's north face, loess landscape in Datong and Zhangye National Geopark.

The geology of China (or the geological structure of the People's Republic of China) consists of three Precambrian cratons surrounded by a number of orogenic belts. The modern tectonic environment is dominated by the continued collision of India with the rest of Asia starting 40–50 million years ago. This has formed the Himalayas and continues to deform most of China. China has vast mineral reserves, a significant earthquake risk in its western regions and rare isolated active volcanoes throughout the country.

Many geological concepts were discovered very early in China's history. However, it was not until the adoption of European natural science in the late 19th century that geology became a science in China.

== Landscape evolution ==
Geomorphology of China.

The geomorphology of China can be divided into several parts. The historical centre of Chinese culture is on the loess plateau, the world's largest Quaternary loess deposit, and on the alluvial lands at the east of it. The alluvial East China plain extends from just south of Beijing in the north, to the Yangtze River delta in the south, punctuated only by the igneous Shandong highlands and peninsula.

South of the Yangtze river, most of the landscape is mountainous, dominated by sedimentary deposits and by the South China Craton. The most famous scenery in China is found in the karst landscapes of Guangxi and Yunnan provinces. The alluvial Sichuan basin is surrounded by mountains, the Qinling mountains to the north and the Himalaya to the west and southwest. Much of Northeast China, or Manchuria, is dominated by alluvial plains, but the border regions with Korea are also highly mountainous. In the west, most of the Tibetan Plateau is in China, and averages over 4000 metres in elevation. The Yunnan-Guizhou plateau is also an extension of the Tibetan Plateau.

=== Himalaya and Tibetan Plateau ===
The Indian Craton has behaved like a near ridge block, moving north, and compacting the weaker, mostly sedimentary, rock into the Himalaya. Relative to a fixed Eurasian plate the central Himalaya and Tibetan Plateau are moving north (being pushed by India). The eastern half of the mountainous region is moving east away from India. The Tibetan Plateau is unstable and as its sides move away extension is occurring in its center. This east–west extension is accommodated on north–south trending normal faults.

The Tian Shan are a mountain range north of the Tibetan Plateau and the Taklamakan Desert. Uplift of these mountains began 24 million years ago. It was a direct response to the continued extension of the Indian collision zone. The mountain range is still uplifting today along with the Himalaya.

=== Karst formation ===
One seventh of the area of China is covered in carbonate rocks (limestone and marble) which are easily chemically eroded by water, forming a karst landscape. This morphology is not well developed across the west and north of China where there is less rainfall than the main karst region in the southeast. China's karst regions are almost all formed in rocks of Devonian to Triassic age. Near Guilin the lowering of the base level, through uplift and river erosion, has formed prominent karst hills. It is estimated that the river erodes down 50–100 mm/kyr, from this the age of the karst landscape is estimated at 10–20 million years (Miocene).

=== Desertification and loess ===
The central China loess sequence records many periods of climatic variation. During dry (often cooler) periods wind erosion increases and loess is deposited, while during wetter and warmer periods paleosols form. The desertification of China's interior is inferred to have started 23 million years ago (Early Miocene) due to the formation of loess deposits from this time until 6.2 million years ago.

The glacial and inter-glacial Pleistocene climatic cycles are also presented in the loess deposites. Extensive loess sequences were deposited during a cool period 2.5 to 2.3 million years ago and the most prominent paleosol formed between 615 and 470 hundred thousand years ago.

The start of the Holocene (10 to 8 thousand years ago) is recorded as a warm and wet time in central China, most likely from the melting of snow and ice off the Tibetan Plateau. A decrease in the area of loess deposits shows that the Holocene Climatic Optimum occurred across central China 8 to 5 thousand years ago.

=== Hainan and the South China Sea ===
The island province of Hainan is located off the south coast of China's mainland. It was separated from the mainland by tectonic rifting and coastal erosion. The parts of the South China Sea that China claims, formed by the evolution of continental rifting into oceanic spreading during the mid Cenozoic. There are numerous sea mounts and island carbonate reefs that have developed on horsts formed during the extension.

== Cratons and orogenies ==
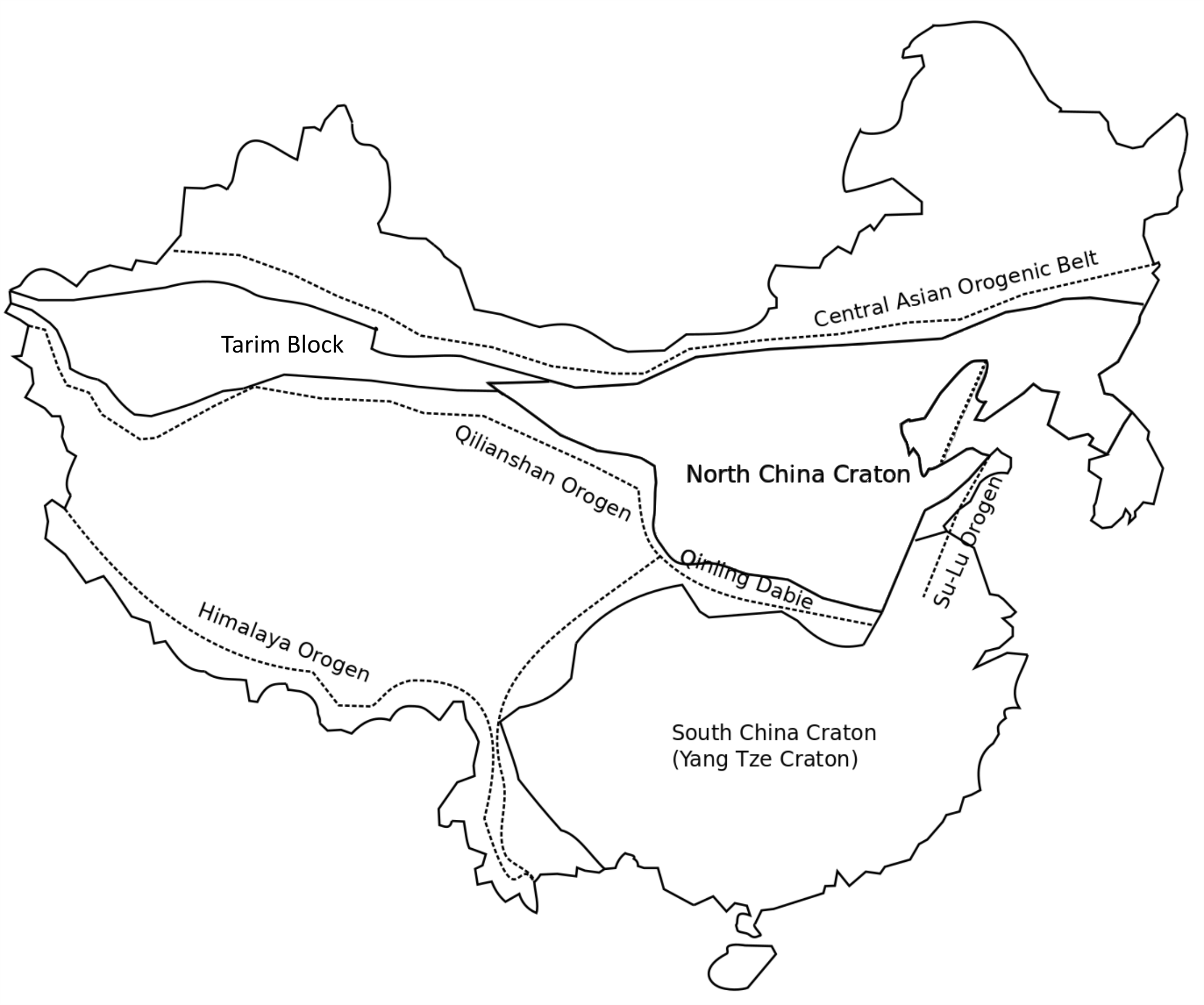
Tectonic regions of China. Simplified form from Kusky et al., 2007 and Zhao et al., 2005

China has three Precambrian cratons, the North China, South China and Tarim Block. These have a series of sedimentary units overlying them. As these blocks have been fused together, the oceans that once separated them have been compressed into the orogenic belts, that are now between them. There are multiple ways of naming and defining each of these units in the modern literature.

=== North China Craton ===
The Precambrian North China Craton is predominately metamorphosed island-arc igneous rocks that formed between 3.5 and 3 billion years ago. The craton had fully formed by 1.7 billion years ago. Thick sediments were deposited on the craton from 1000 to 539 million years ago.

=== South China Craton ===
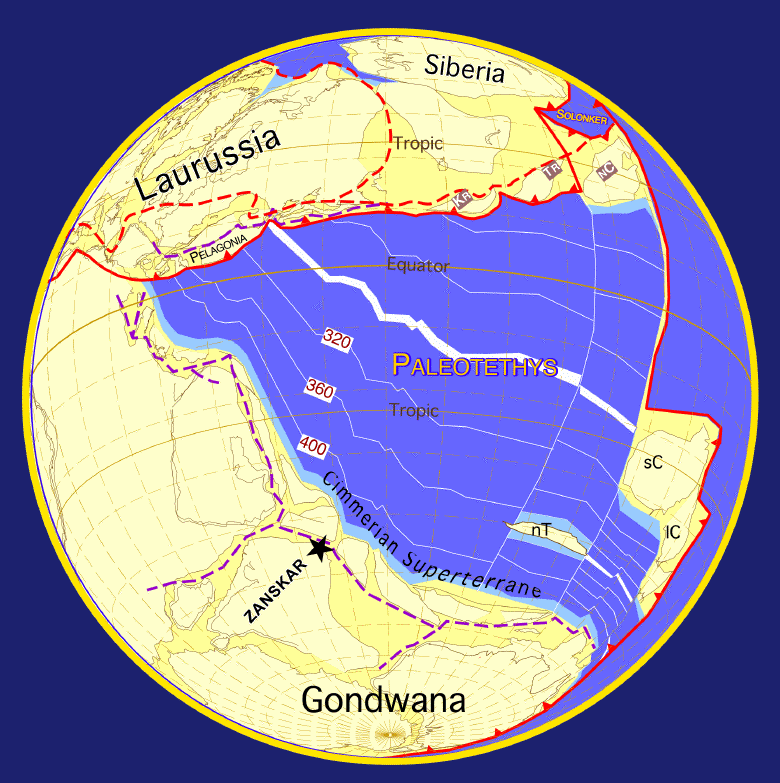
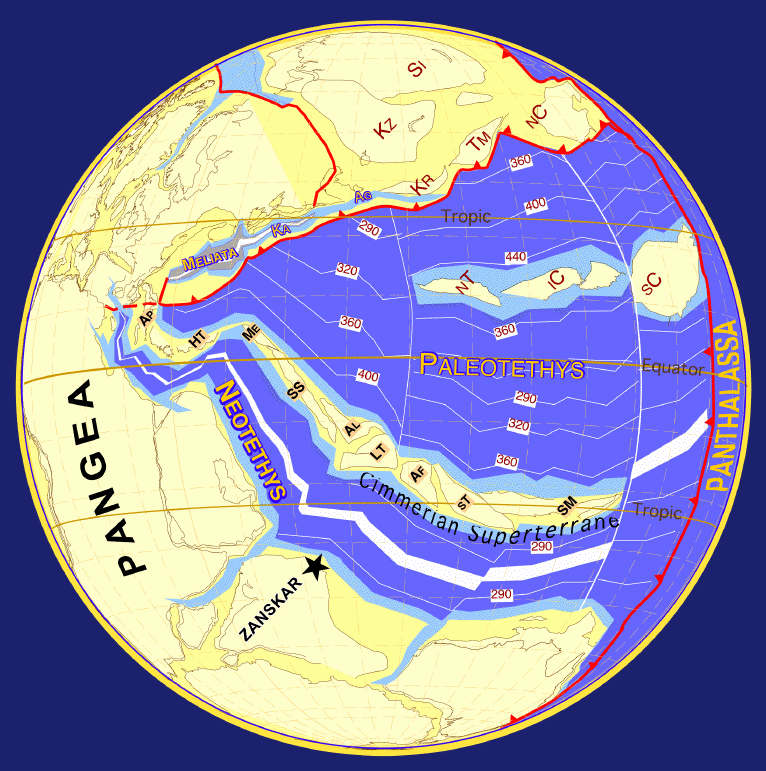
Closing of the Tethys Ocean and amalgamation of the North and South China Cratons. 290 million years ago (left) and 249 million years ago (right). NC = North China Craton, SC = South China Craton.

The South China Craton (also Yangtze Craton) is younger than the North China Craton and ranges in age from 2.5 to 0.8 billion years old. The South China Craton is divided into three parts, western, central and eastern. Unlike the North China Craton the South China Craton used to be part of Gondwana.

The Cathaysia Fold Belt is attached to the southeastern side of the Craton.

=== Tarim Block ===
The Tarim Block in North West China (Xinjiang) is a relatively thin zone of Precambrian rock and Neoproterozoic to Cambrian cover sequence that may be related to the South China Craton. The Precambrian units, like the South China Craton, also finished forming 0.8 billion years ago. The Tarim Block can be divided into three parts the North Tarim, South Tarim and Central Tarim terrane. Between 2.80 and 2.57 billion years ago the Tarim Block was intruded by granites. During the formation of the Columbia and Rodinia supercontinents the block experienced tectono-metamorphic events between 2.0–1.8 and 1.0–0.9 billion years ago respectively.

From 760 million years ago the Tarim Block began to split from Rodinia leading to igneous activity. Following this a series of terranes were accreted to the side of the block. In the early Paleozoic the Qaidam was accreted to the south and in the late Paleozoic the Yili Terrane was accreted to the north of the block. Igneous activity finished in the block, after the formation of a large igneous province in the Permian.

=== Himalayan Orogen ===
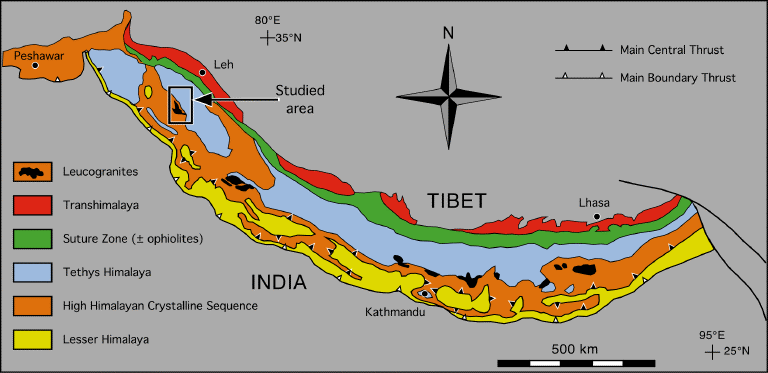
Geologic map of the Himalaya Orogen.

The Tethys Ocean closed about 50 million years ago and Indo-Australian Plate began to collide with Asia. The Himalaya is now mostly formed from the uplifted sedimentary rocks from this ocean. These sedimentary rocks along with associated igneous rocks, now often metamorphosed, from a series of east–west slivers of rock through the mountain range. From south to north there are four main tectonic sub-units within the Himalaya: the sub-Himalaya, Lesser Himalaya, Central Himalayan Domain and Indus Suture Zone.

The Himalaya's foothills or sub-Himalaya are Miocene to Pleistocene sediments that have eroded off the mountain range during its uplift. These sedimentary rocks have been highly deformed by the continued uplift of the Himalaya. The upper Proterozoic to lower Cambrian Lesser Himalaya sedimentary rocks represent the Himalaya's main range front. These rocks are often thrusted over the alluvial rocks of the sub-Himalaya. The Lesser Himalaya also contains granites and felsic volcanic rocks. The Central Himalayan Domain contains rocks from the Tethys Ocean and is also intruded by Miocene granites, related to the formation of the Himalaya. The Indus Suture Zone is the suture zone with the Lhasa terrane to the north. It contains the ophiolites and island arc related igneous rocks mostly from the Mesozoic.

=== Qilianshan Orogen ===
The Qilianshan Orogen (also Qilian Shan Orogen) formed in the Early to Mid Paleozoic in modern North West China. The rocks of the region record a Cambrian to Devonian subduction accretion complex.

=== Central Asian Orogenic Belt ===
This is a wide zone of tectonic suturing that in part represents the closure of the Paleo-Asian Ocean. During this closure abduction was occurring on both sides of the ocean. This has formed seduction related Paleozoic orthogneiss throughout the sequence. This zone represents the largest accretionary origenic sequence in the world.

=== Su-Lu Orogen ===
The Su-Lu Orogen (also Dabie-Sulu or Sulu orogen) formed during the Mesozoic in what is now the central eastern coast of China. Within this zone are exposed the largest zone of ultrahigh-pressure metamorphic rocks in the world. These originally formed deep within a subduction zone, where oceanic crust from the South China Block went beneath the North China Block during the Triassic. The region was also intruded by granites from the same time period.

=== Qinling Dabie ===
The Qinling Dabie represents the suture zone between the North and South China cratons in the Triassic. The orogenic belt started to form 2.5 billion years ago in the Proterozoic.

== Earthquakes ==
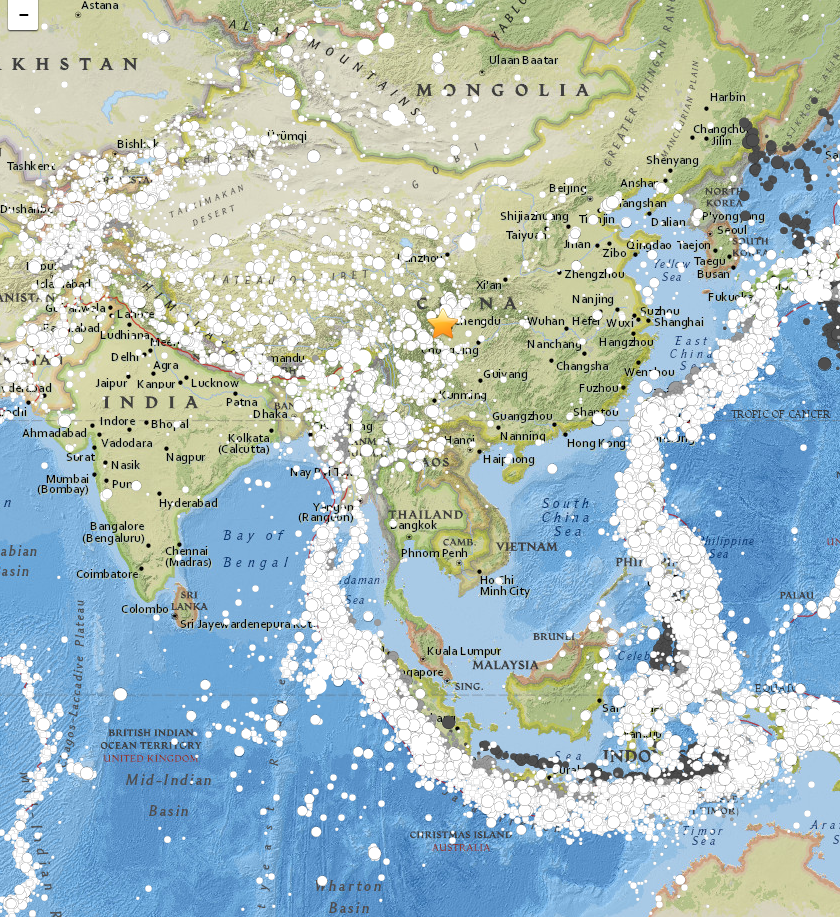
Earthquakes with a magnitude 4.5 and over (1900-2015). The yellow star is the 2008 Sichuan earthquake.

The collision of India with the rest of Asia has led to seismic activity throughout western China, particularly in Tibet and the Yunnan, Xinjiang, Sichuan, Gansu and Qinghai provinces. However, these regions in comparison with eastern China have a low population density. These areas also in general have poorer transport and building codes. Throughout China poor building codes increases the damage and loss of life from earthquakes.

China has been the location of some of the most deadly earthquakes in history. Hundreds of thousands of people were killed by magnitude 8.0 earthquakes in 1303 in Hongdong and 1556 in Shaanxi. This Shaanxi earthquake killed about 830,000 people, many dying with the collapses of their underground homes built into loess banks and cliffs. The 20th century saw 273,400 people killed in the 1920 Haiyuan earthquake and a magnitude 8.6 earthquake in 1950, the largest recorded earthquake in China. In 2008 the magnitude 8.0 2008 Sichuan earthquake killed 87,587 people.

Earthquake prediction was popular between 1966 and 1976, which overlapped with the Cultural Revolution. This reached its height with the successful prediction of the 1975 Haicheng earthquake. This earthquake had a prominent series of fore-shocks and authorities who were eager to issue a warning. However, very few earthquakes have both these criteria. The unpredictable and devastating Tangshan earthquake in 1976 led to a reduction of the popularity of earthquake prediction in China.

== Volcanoes ==
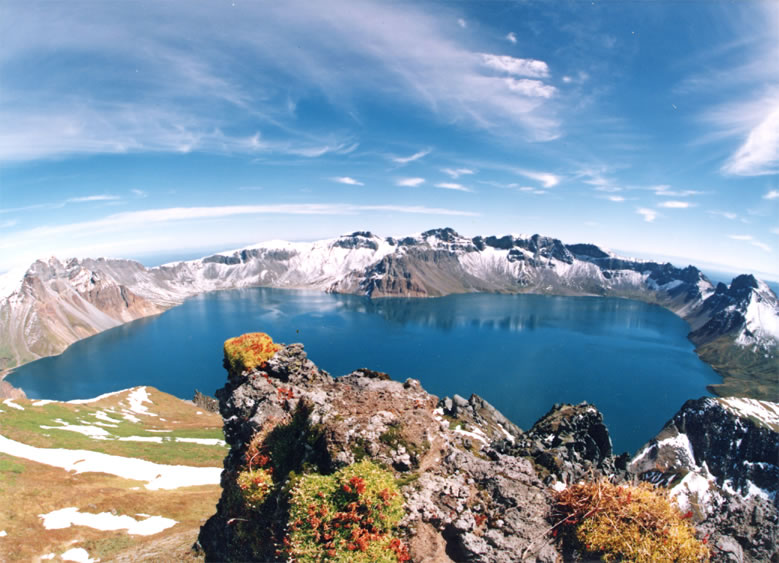
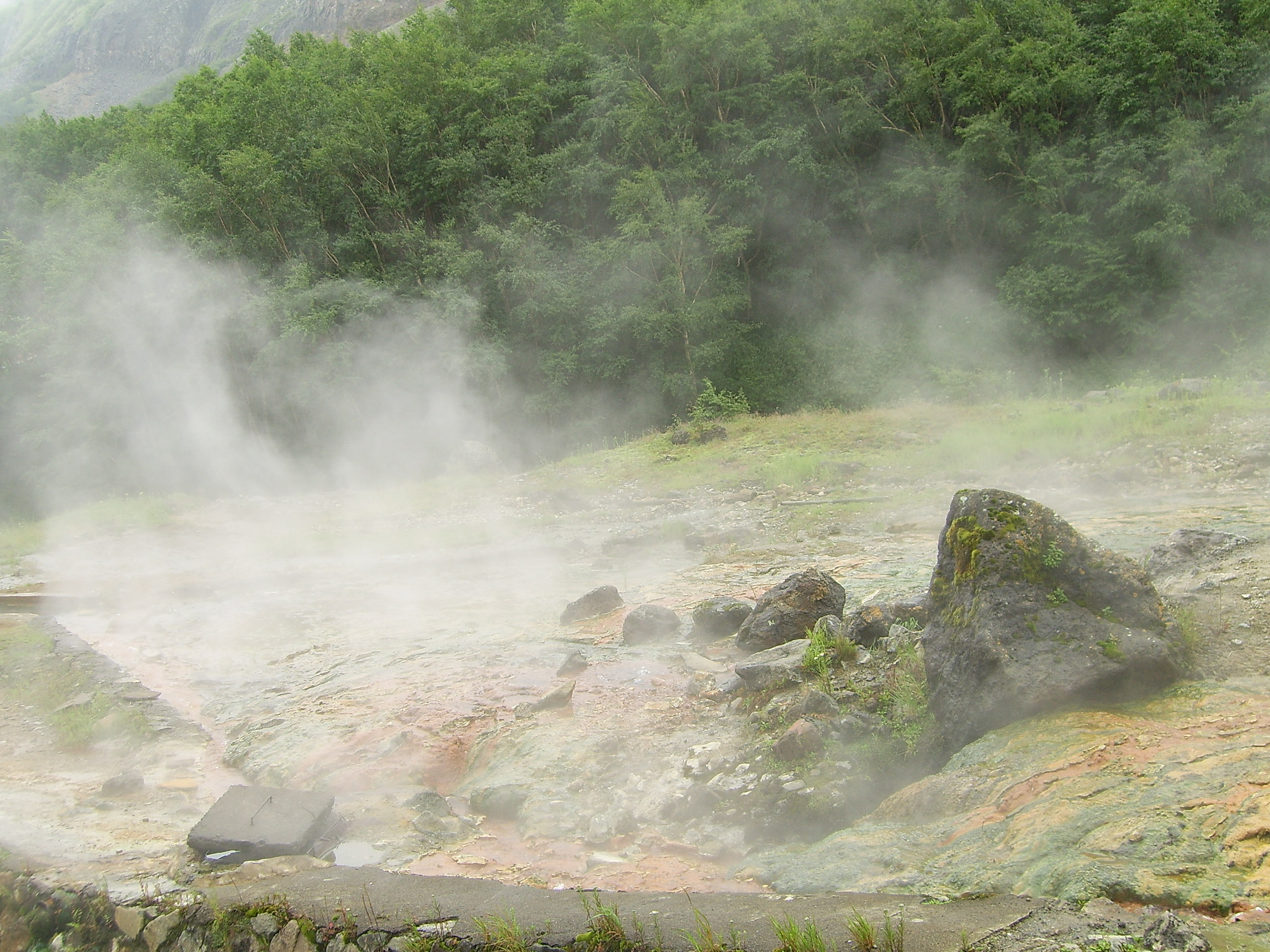
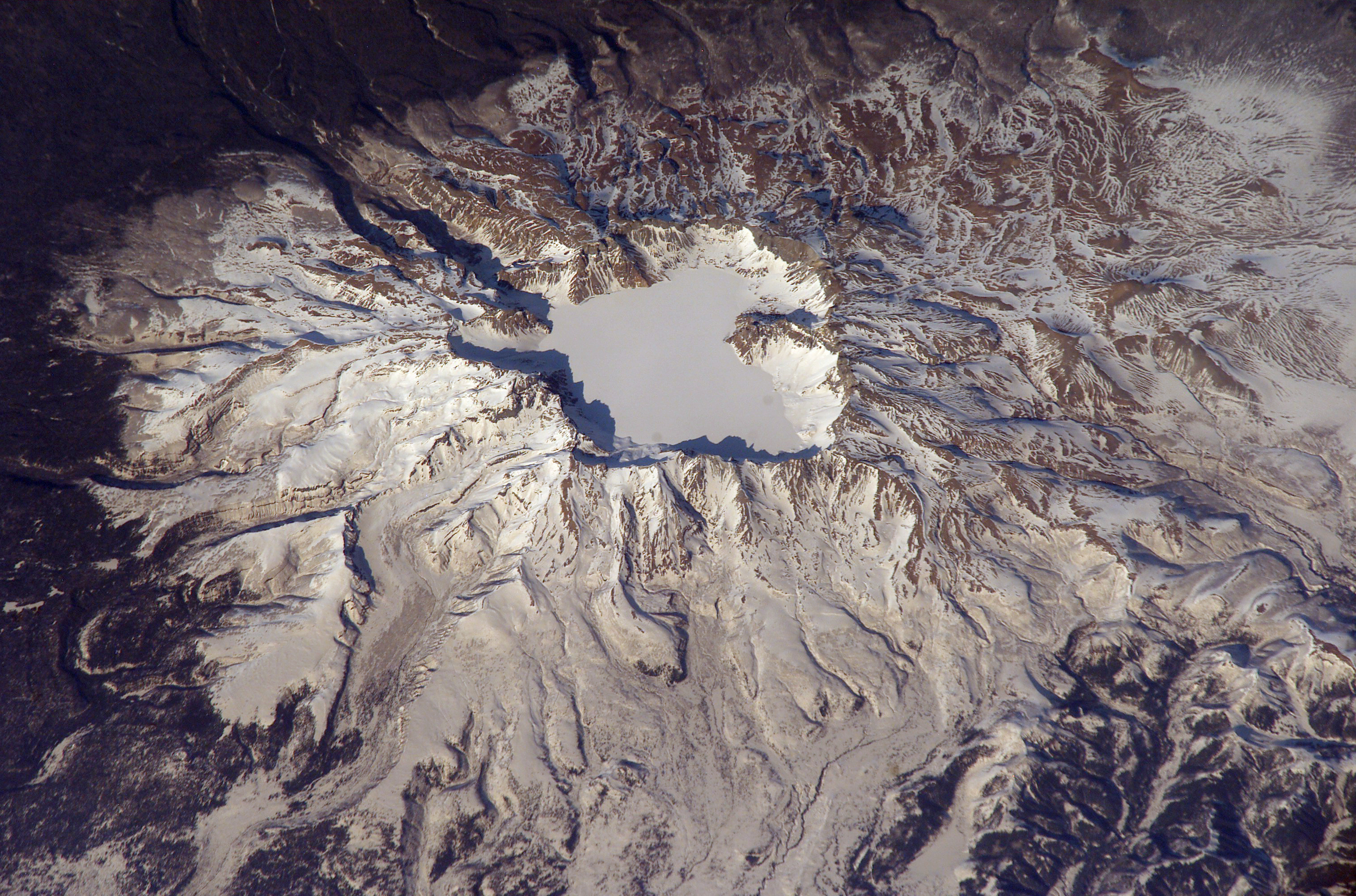
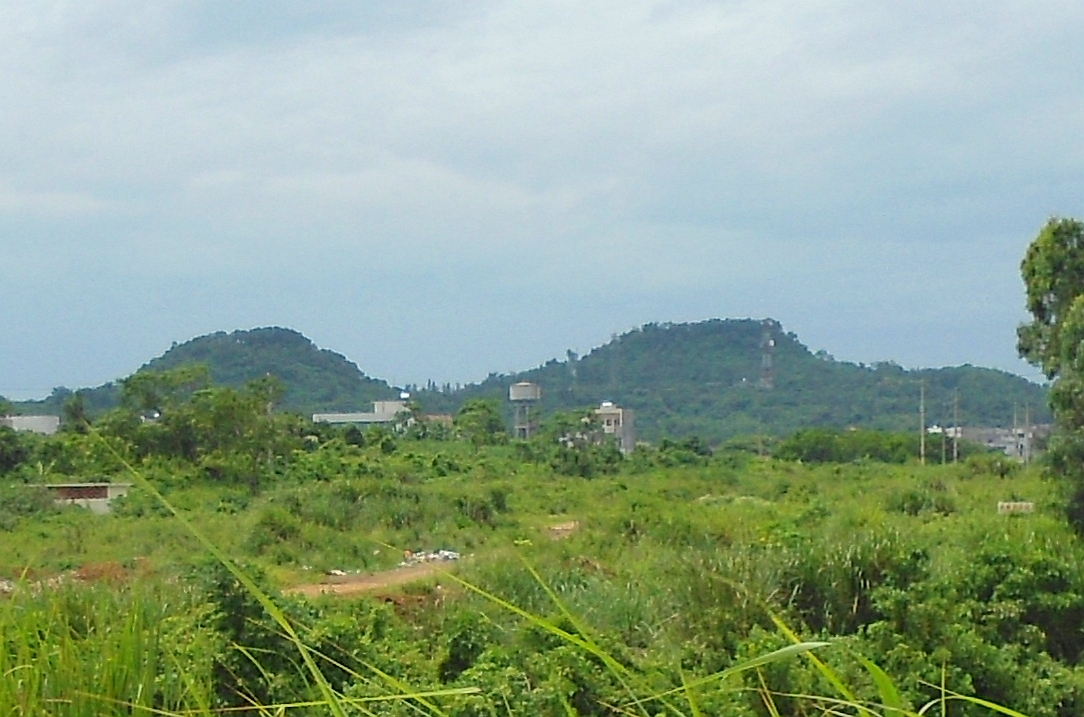
Clockwise from upper left: Heaven Lake (Mount Paektu), Changbai hotsprings (Mount Paektu), Haikou Volcanic Cluster Global Geopark and Mount Paektu, April 2003.

All of China's recently active volcanoes have formed within tectonic plates, however, there is extensive arc related volcanism off the eastern coast. Active volcanoes are found in the Changbaishan, Jingbo Lake, Wudalianchi, Tengchong and Yutian areas.

The Baitoushan volcano (also called Paektu Mountain), on the border with North Korea) erupted in 946 AD. This was one of the largest volcanic eruptions in recorded history. There have been three eruptions in the Baitoushan volcano area in the last 400 years (1668, 1702, and 1903).

Ashi volcano of the Kunlun Volcanic Group in northwestern Tibet erupted in 1951 and is China's most recent eruption.

== Mining and petroleum ==
China has many different types of mineral resources and has global significant reserves of many of them. They are frequently in the global top 10 countries for mineral reserves or production. They produce more than 90% of the global rare earth element ore. Chrysotile (asbestos) is still mined and used extensively in China as a construction material.

China's iron ore is mainly found in northeast and southwest of mainland China. China's largest gold mining region is in the northeast of the country. In 2014 China mined more gold than any other country, however, its projected reserves places it between 6th and 10th in the world.

There are extensive coal fields throughout China. In the southeast of the country the coal is Permian in age. In the north of China coal is from the Jurassic in the west but reaches the Cretaceous in parts of the northeast. Tibet and Qinghai have a relative dearth of coal measures. China's petroleum reserves are located off or near the eastern seaboard and in the Taklamakan Desert. Unproven oil reserves in the South China Sea are part of the motivation for the continued border disputes in the region. Oil shale reserves have also been discovered in the north of the country.

== History of Chinese geology ==
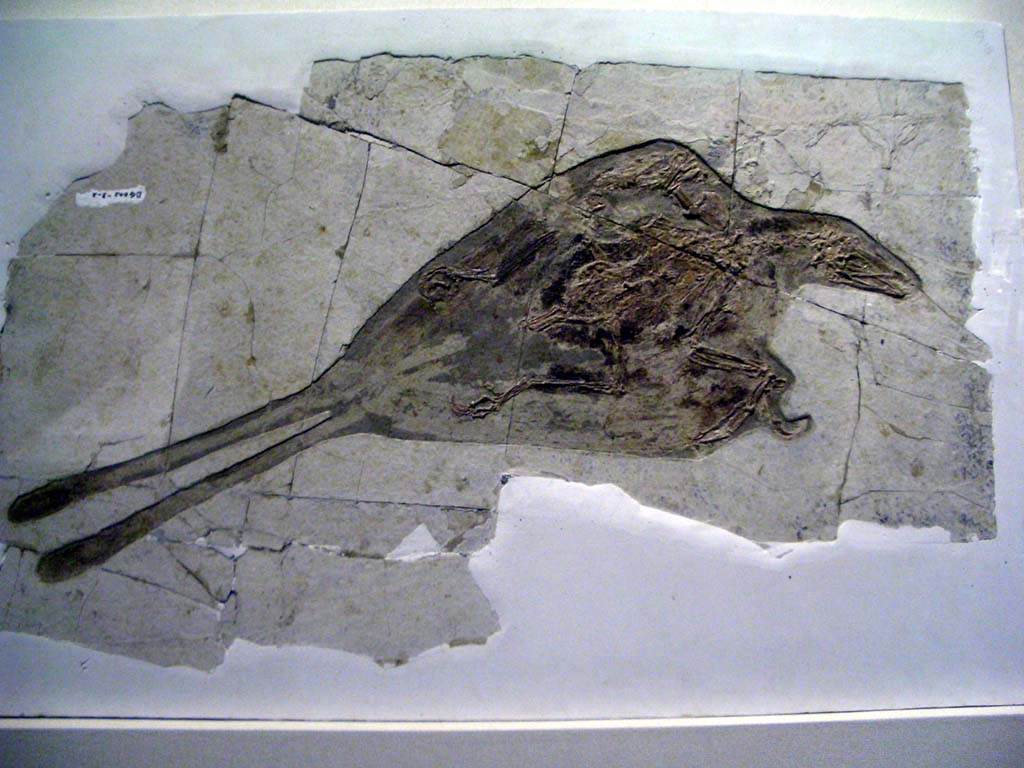
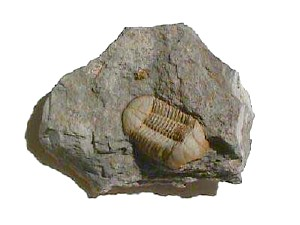
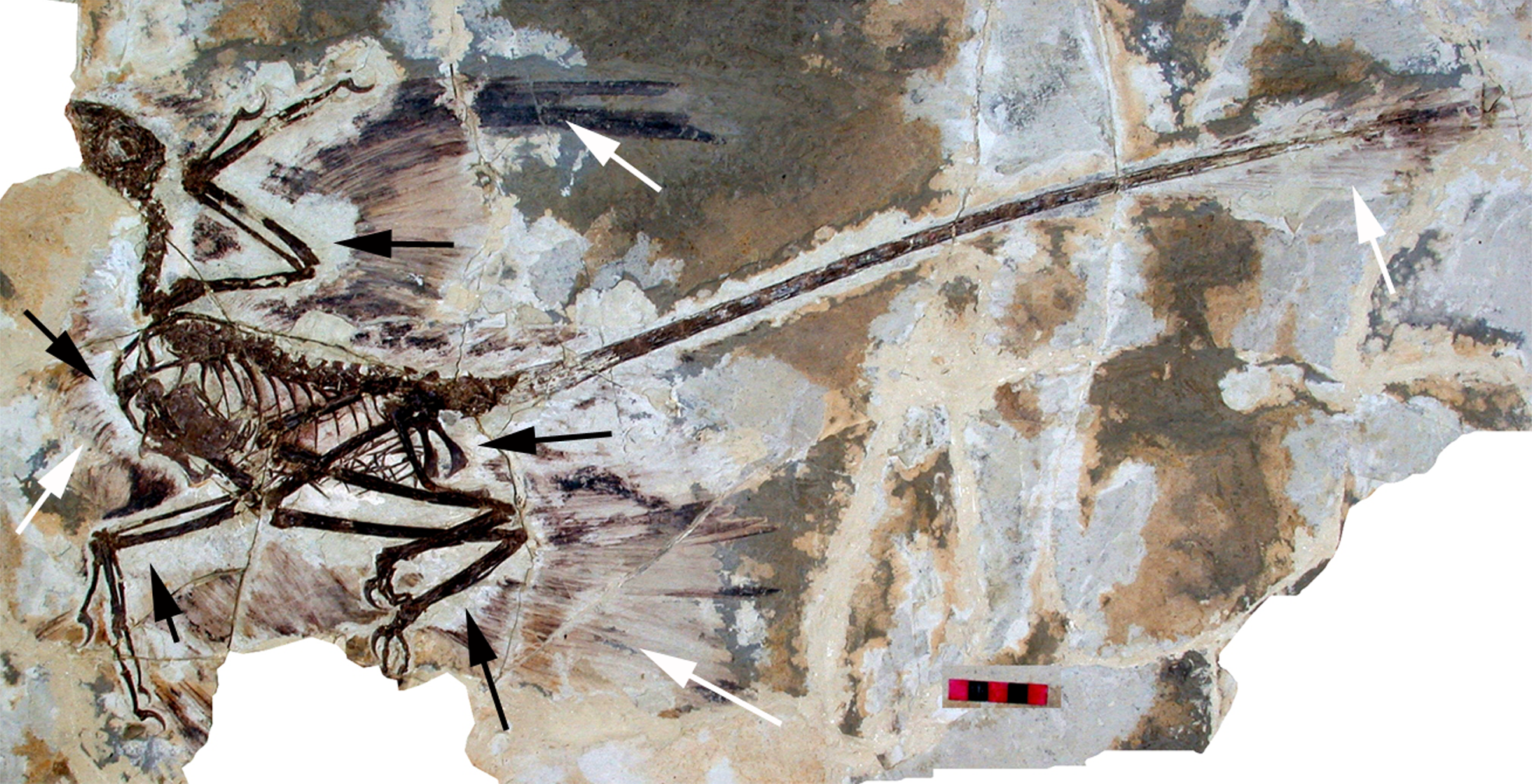
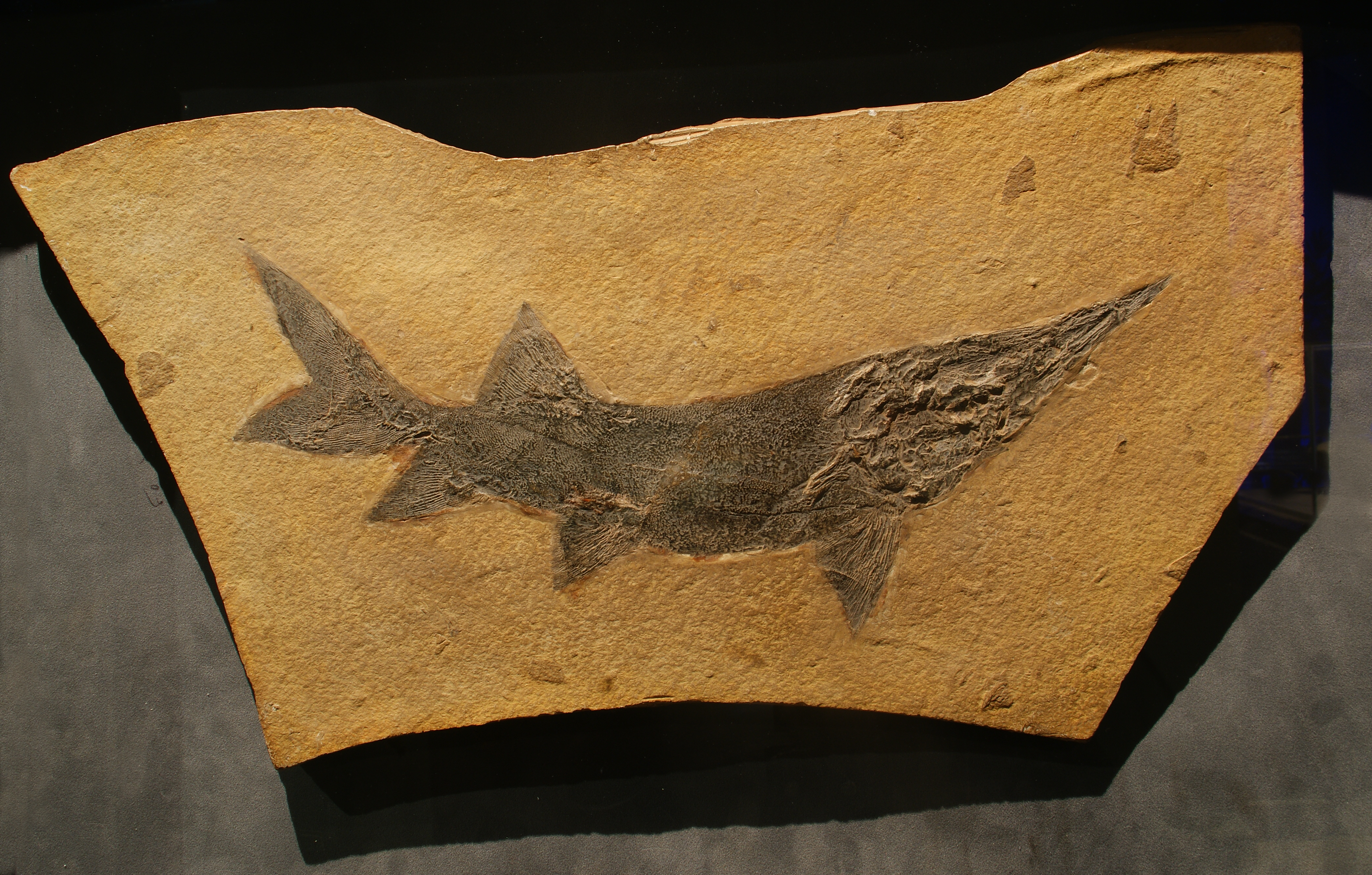
Chinese fossils, clockwise from upper left: Confuciusornis sanctus displayed in Hong Kong Science Museum, Ductina vietnamica from the Devonian (Hunan), Protopsephurus fossil specimen excavated in Liaoning and the holotype of Microraptor gui.

=== Ancient ===
Geological topics are discussed in some of China's earliest writings. Between 500 BC and 800 AD Chinese scholars described mountains, minerals, fossils and documented the locations of ore bodies. They also noted that some of these marine fossils came from the tops of mountains.

Fossils and some minerals were prized for their aesthetics and medical properties. One practice involved dissolving a fossil (calcite) in vinegar (an acid) and then drinking the liquid. However, as knowledge of the natural world was excluded from the imperial examination system no systematic study developed.

It was also observed in the 11th century, by Chinese scholar Shen Kuo, in his work Dream Pool Essays, that the existence of fossils of species that no longer lived in the area, showed that climates had changed in the past. He also inferred that the landscape evolved over time, due to erosion and uplift. This led him to believe that vast spans of time were needed to form China's geomorphology.

=== Scientific era ===
It was not until late in the Qing dynasty (1644–1911) that the government formulated a policy to introduce foreign science and technology into China. Modern geologic ideas were introduced with the establishment of technical schools and the translation into Chinese of works by James D. Dana and Charles Lyell during the 1870s. Early in the twentieth century, foreign geology teachers were brought to China and Chinese students were sent to foreign countries to study geology. This infusion successfully developed the modern teaching and practice of geology in China.

In the 2000s the discovery of a number of novel dinosaur fossils has led to international interest in Chinese paleontology. China also has international significant fossil beds from the Precambrian (Weng’an Biota), the early Cambrian (Chengjiang Biota) and the Early Cretaceous (Jehol Biota). Chinese fossils have provided the missing link in many evolutionary trees. China has also been the location of discoveries in the human fossil record. Almost all of China's important geological discoveries are now published in English as this allows access to more prestigious international journals.

== China Geological Survey ==
The China Geological Survey (CGS) was founded in 1915. However, it was disbanded after the Chinese Civil War and only reinstated in 1999. During this time geological exploration and natural hazard mitigation was performed by other government departments. The CGS supplies information to international cooperations and disseminates public geoscience knowledge and information to promote the sustainable development of China's natural resources. The CGS also works internationally on mineral exploration and geological research. About 28% of the CGS published research is in collaboration with international researchers, which is comparable to that of the United States Geological Survey. The CGS has also been involved in environmental research in China. This has included the 2013 findings that 90% of Chinese cities had "polluted" groundwater, and about 66% have "severely polluted" groundwater. The CGS can be seen as part of China's use of international soft power as it attempts to gain access to foreign minerals.

== Geological parks ==
China has 44 national geological parks managed since 1999 by the Chinese Ministry of Land and Resources in cooperation with UNESCO to find a way to protect geological sites of importance while encouraging both tourism and scientific research. Zhangjiajie Gritstone-peak Forest, China's best preserved cluster of volcanoes and geological features in Hunan Province, in 2001 became among the first nationally designated geological park. In February 2004, UNESCO announced the World Network of Geological Parks as well as its first geology park conference to be held in Beijing from June 27–29, 2004. Of the 28 original UNESCO World Geoparks, eight are in China.

Currently there 26 World Geoparks in China. These include the Shilin Geopark in China's Yunnan Province, featuring a carbonate peak forest landform, which brings about the formation of various karst landscapes, such as stone teeth, corroded gullies and corroded funnels. The Huangshan Geopark in Anhui Province, famed for its grand and steep mountains, with 72 peaks of over 1,000 meters high. The geopark is picturesque with green and straight pines, jagged rocks of grotesque shapes, wide and imposing cloud sea, as well as many gushing warm springs. Other world-class Chinese geology parks include Lushan Geopark in Jiangxi Province, Yuntaishan Geopark and Songshan Geopark in central China's Henan Province, Danxia Geopark in Guangdong, Zhangjiajie Geopark in Hunan, and Wudalianchi Geopark in northeast China's Heilongjiang Province.

== See also ==
- China Geological Survey
- China University of Geosciences
- Environment of China
- Geological Museum of China
- National Geoparks of China
- Ministry of Land and Resources of the People's Republic of China
- Chinese Academy of Geological Sciences
- Chinese Geological Formations

=== Regional geology ===
- Geology of Fujian
- Geology of Hainan Island
- Geology of the Himalaya
- Geology of Hong Kong
- Geology of the Pearl River Delta
- Tectonics of the South China Sea
