= Chinese rock (disambiguation) =

Chinese rock is a style of music.

Chinese rock may also refer to:

- Chinese Rocks, by The Heartbreakers and later by The Ramones
- Chinese scholar's rocks, small rocks appreciated by Chinese scholars

== See also ==
- Geology of China
