= Geology of the Pearl River Delta =

Pearl River Delta
- Stratigraphic range: Neoproterozoic to Cenozoic
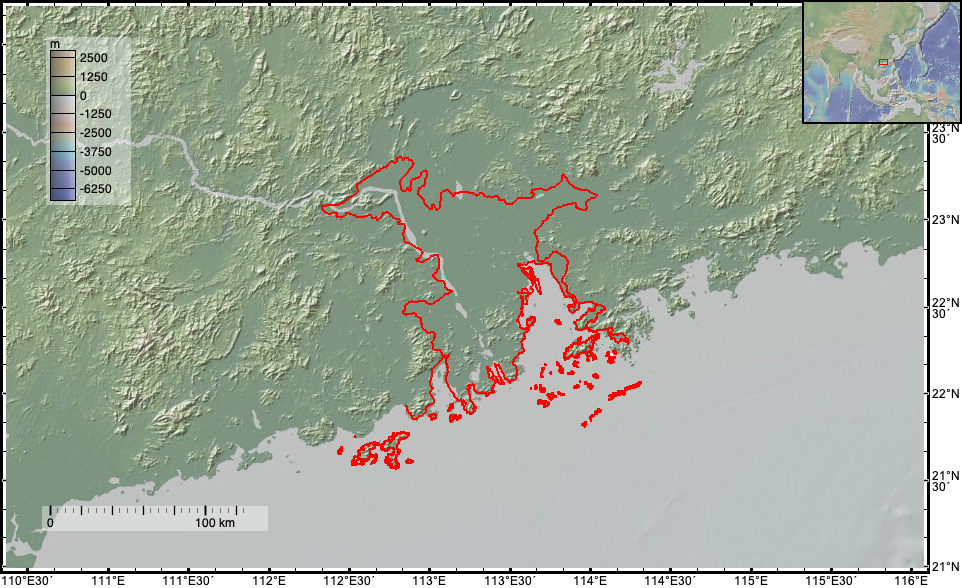
- Fig.1 Map showing the location and relief of Pearl River Delta
- Type: Geological formation (delta)

Location
- Coordinates: 21°20'–23°30'N and 112°40'–114°50'E
- Region: Sub-tropical area
- Extent: East Asia

Type section
- Country: China

The geology of the Pearl River Delta is rock sequences plus superficial sediments, emplaced in an alluvial delta, occupying the Pearl River Estuary. The unconsolidated sediments which dominate the delta are largely derived from continental materials exposed across the Pearl River basin, and range in size from fine particles such as mud to larger fragments like gravel. These deltaic materials have been deposited for 9000 years atop the bedrock at the mouth of the Pearl River in Guangdong Province, situated along the northern margin of the South China Sea.

This landform, replete with an intricate network of river channels, has been evolving since the Early Holocene era, shaping the contemporary delta landscape observed today. During this period, cyclical variations in sea level, known as regression and transgression, have occurred. As a result, space has been created for the deposition of sediments carried by the Pearl River. The Quaternary geological sequence, which overlies the bedrock, exemplifies this cycle. It comprises marine units, primarily constituted by silt and clay, as well as continental units, dominated by sand and gravel. The bedrock underlying the delta exhibits complexity due to varying deformation and intrusion events prompted by significant tectonic activities. The ongoing evolution of the delta is principally influenced by neo-tectonic movements, fluvial processes, fluctuations in sea level, and human activities. These elements collectively exert a significant impact on the dynamic development and transformation of the delta.

== Geomorphology ==
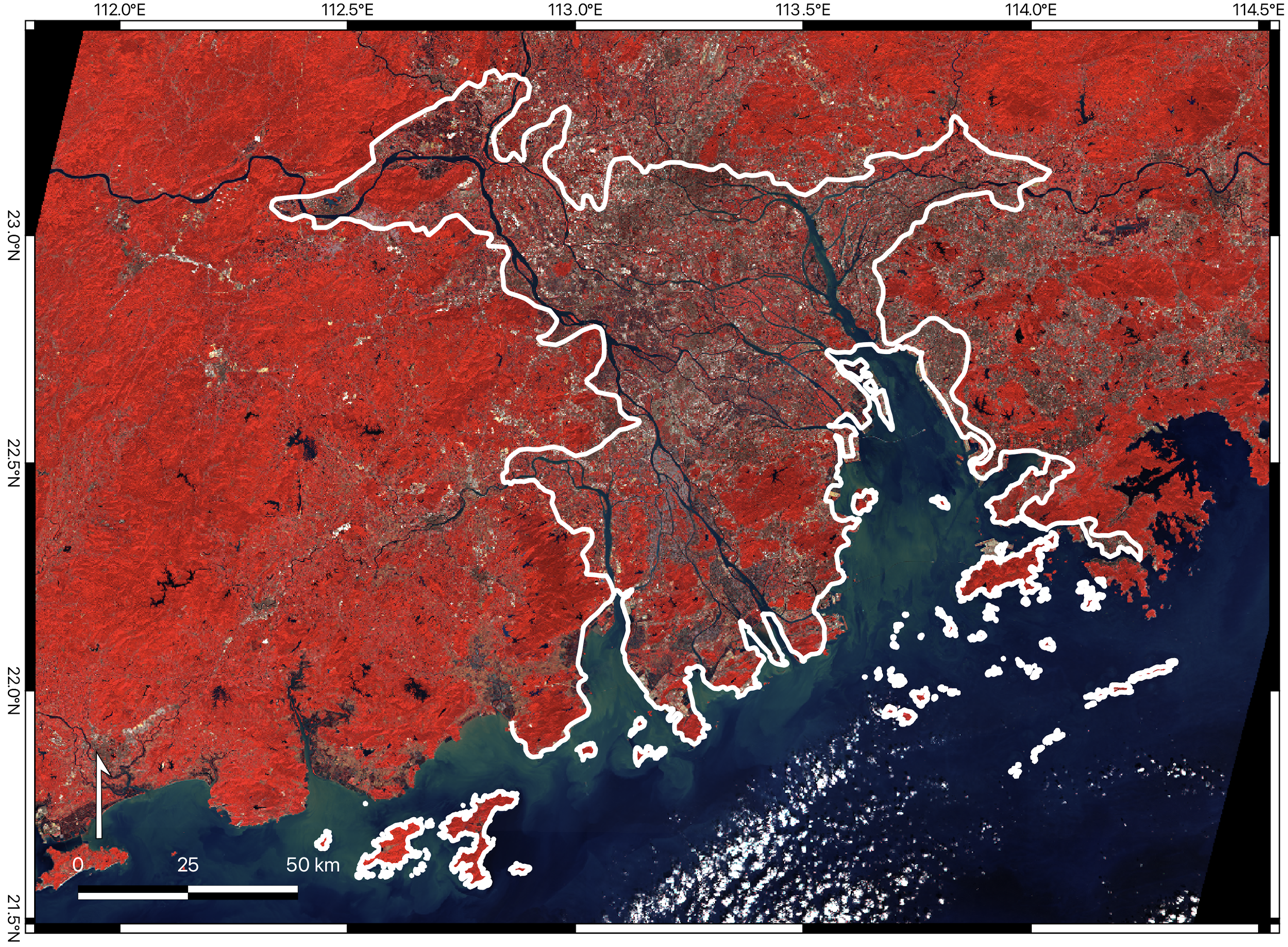
Fig.2 False colour map of Pearl River Delta, highlighting the morphology and distribution of the river channel

The Pearl River Delta, typically flat and low-lying, has a maximum elevation of 10 meters above sea level, a characteristic feature of deltaic formations. The delta's formation is largely attributed to the deposition of sediment transported by its three main sub-rivers: the East River, the North River, and the Xi Jiang, which collectively flow into the Pearl River Estuary. Despite its predominantly low relief, the delta plain, which spans approximately 9750 km², is interspersed with over 160 islands in varied forms such as hills and monadnocks, with elevations ranging from 100 to 300 meters. These rocky islands comprise about one fifth of the delta's total area (~2000 km²). This unique geomorphological feature results from a combination of fault-block activity and diverse bedrock.

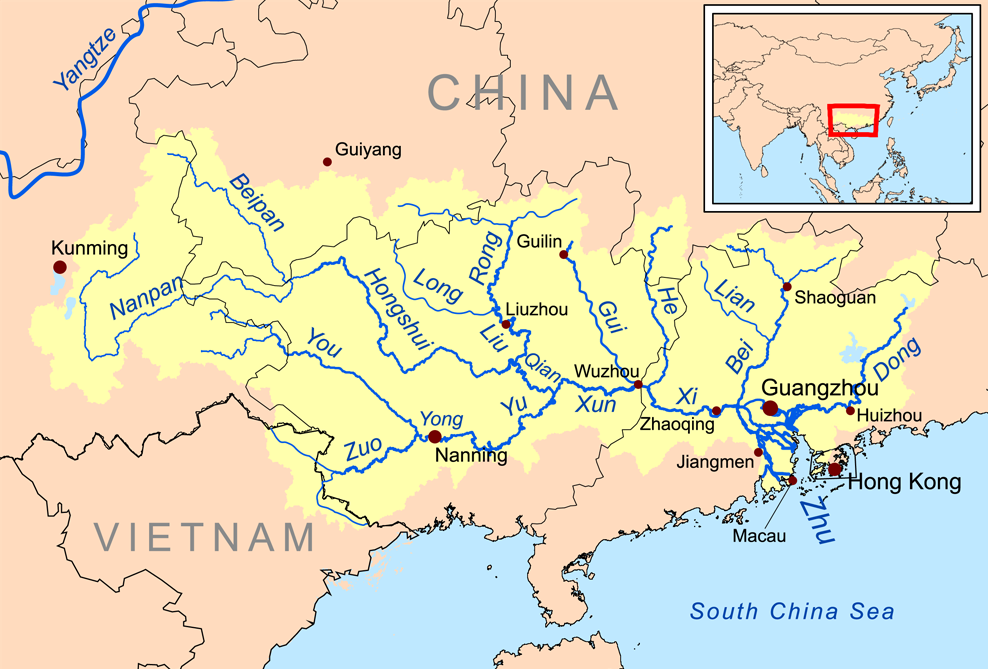
Fig.3 Map of the drainage basin of Pearl River. Showing how the tributaries connect to the main river

The Pearl River Delta represents a complex deltaic system. Unlike the Mississippi River Delta, a textbook example of a river delta, it does not neatly fit into William Galloway's triangular delta classification, which categorizes deltas into three types: river-dominated, wave-dominated, and tide-dominated. The Pearl River Delta is influenced by both tidal and wave processes, with certain parts dominated by fluvial processes. Due to the presence of bedrock islands in the estuary area and the main river being constrained by the steep relief surrounding the deltaic region, the main channel's course has remained relatively stable, preventing the formation of deltaic lobes akin to those in the Mississippi River Delta. Consequently, the deltaic plains are concentrated in the current delta area.

== Geological setting ==
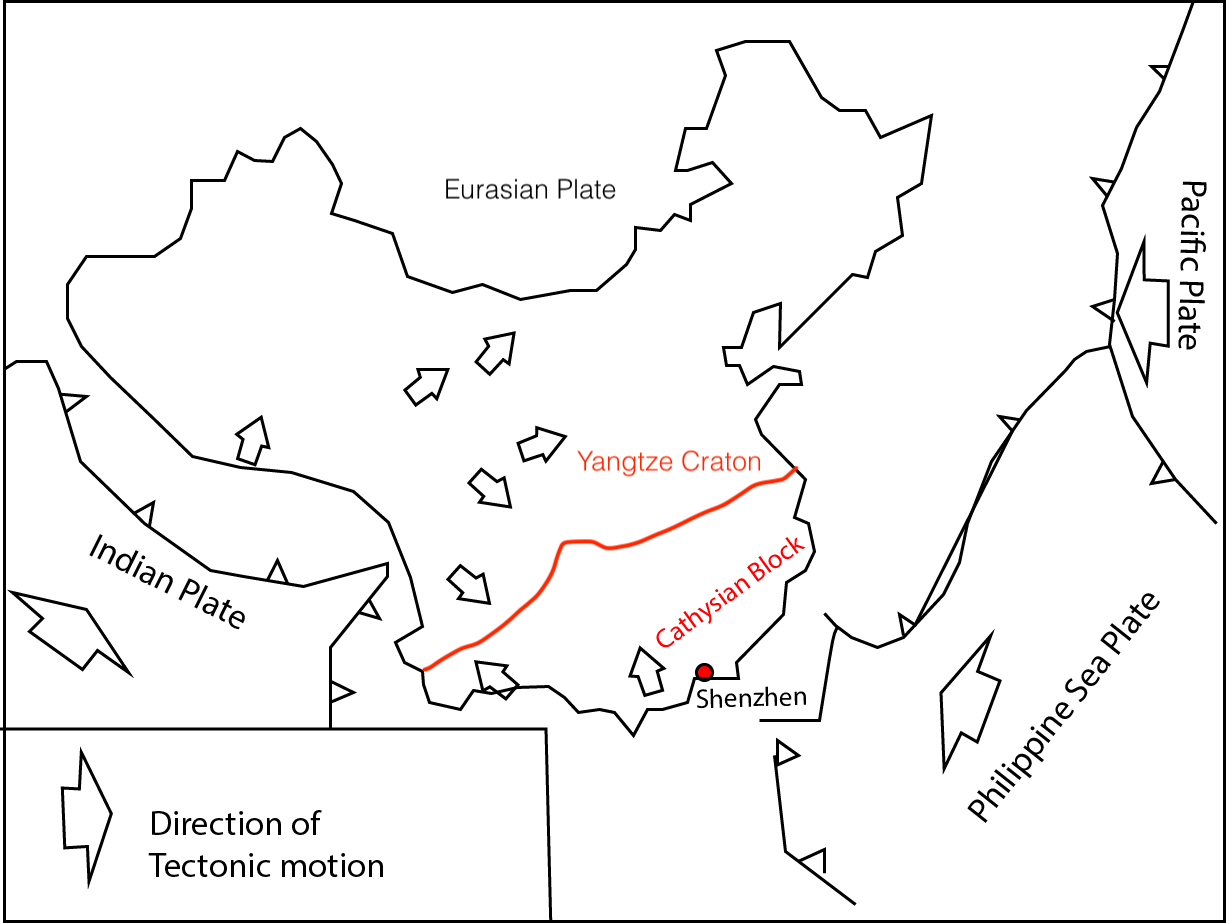
Fig.4 Showing the location of Block and pushing direction from the two plates

The Pearl River Delta is situated on the southern edge of the Cathaysia Block, one of the key crustal blocks in southeastern China. This region is situated on the Eurasian tectonic plate, abutting the oceanic crust along the margins of the South China Sea. While it is located at the edge of a passive continental margin, the delta experiences a primary tectonic stress field in the north–south direction due to the compressional motion of the Indian Ocean Plate and the Philippine Sea Plate from various directions.

The stress field within the Pearl River Delta stimulates the activity of the area's faults, considerably influencing the delta's evolution. The subsequent movement and behavior of these faults are key determinants of the continuous development and transformation of this geologically dynamic region. As a result, the behavior of faults and the differential movements of associated fault blocks primarily dictate the neotectonic features in this region, where substantial seismic activity is an occasional phenomenon.

== Geological structure ==
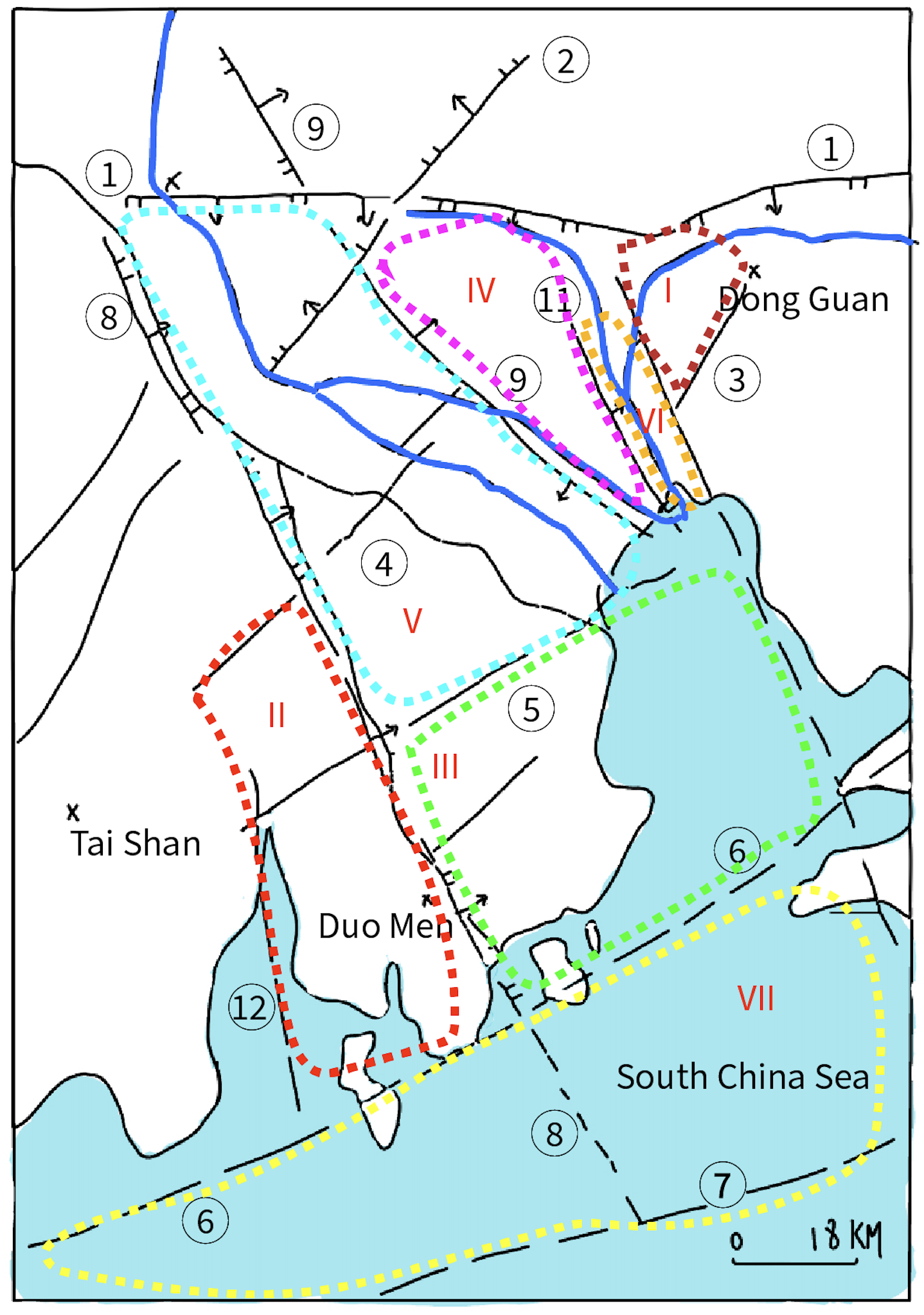
Fig.5 Showing the location of fault and fault block. The names of the faults and the fault blocks can be looked up in the table below according to their numbers

The geological structures of the Pearl River Delta are primarily fault-dominated. Fold structures are relatively scarce in this region, with the nearest large-scale fold structure, the Nanling-Wuyi fold belt, situated significantly distant from the delta.

The fault systems in the deltaic region comprise three main sets: normal, reverse, and strike-slip faults. These faults, which emerged at different times, are categorized by their trending directions: NE-SW, NW-SE, and W-E. Many of these faults have significantly contributed to the local geomorphological development. Particularly, the first set of faults largely shapes the morphology of the coastline and the Pearl River Delta. The Shenzhen fault is a key lineament following this trend.

The interaction of these three fault sets has resulted in the formation of multiple fault blocks that have experienced differential subsidence. These formed fault blocks are crucial in determining the delta's evolution. The rate of sedimentation and the development of river channels in the delta are greatly influenced by the subsidence rate and spatial distribution of these fault blocks. Increased subsidence rates often lead to enhanced sedimentation rates, resulting in thicker sediment deposition. Additionally, fault zones' susceptibility to weathering and erosion has created weak zones in the basement topography, guiding the development of the main river channels in the delta. The accommodation space for Quaternary deposits was predominantly created by such neotectonic activity.

To illustrate the importance of such fault sets, seven fault blocks created by thirteen faults around the main delta are selected. They include:

Fault	Fault type	Fault sets	History	Fault Block	Note
1. Sanshui–Luofushan Fault	Normal fault	W-E	The Yanshanian Movement in the Cretaceous period was responsible for the formation of the faults. These structures underwent several periods of reactivation in subsequent geological processes.	N/A	N/A
2. Guangzhou–Conghua Fault	Normal fault	NE-SW	The Yanshanian Movement in the Cretaceous period was responsible for the formation of the faults. These structures underwent several periods of reactivation in subsequent geological processes.	(I) Dongjiang Delta fault block, (II) Tan Hoi fault block, (III) Wuguishan fault block, (IV) Shiqiao–Guangzhou fault block(I) and (VII) South China Sea fault block	Strong activities of the fault block; Center of deposition; Well preserved in the rock records and can be seen from field evidence.
3. Dongguan–Houjie Fault	Strike-slip fault	NE-SW	The Yanshanian Movement in the Cretaceous period was responsible for the formation of the faults. These structures underwent several periods of reactivation in subsequent geological processes.	(I) Dongjiang Delta fault block, (II) Tan Hoi fault block, (III) Wuguishan fault block, (IV) Shiqiao–Guangzhou fault block(I) and (VII) South China Sea fault block	Strong activities of the fault block; Center of deposition; Well preserved in the rock records and can be seen from field evidence.
4. Shiqiao-Xinhui Fault	Strike-slip fault	NE-SW	The Yanshanian Movement in the Cretaceous period was responsible for the formation of the faults. These structures underwent several periods of reactivation in subsequent geological processes.	(I) Dongjiang Delta fault block, (II) Tan Hoi fault block, (III) Wuguishan fault block, (IV) Shiqiao–Guangzhou fault block(I) and (VII) South China Sea fault block	Strong activities of the fault block; Center of deposition; Well preserved in the rock records and can be seen from field evidence.
5. Wuguishan Fault	Strike-slip fault	NE-SW	The Yanshanian Movement in the Cretaceous period was responsible for the formation of the faults. These structures underwent several periods of reactivation in subsequent geological processes.	(I) Dongjiang Delta fault block, (II) Tan Hoi fault block, (III) Wuguishan fault block, (IV) Shiqiao–Guangzhou fault block(I) and (VII) South China Sea fault block	Strong activities of the fault block; Center of deposition; Well preserved in the rock records and can be seen from field evidence.
6. Shenzhen–Zhuhai Fault	Strike-slip fault	NE-SW	The Yanshanian Movement in the Cretaceous period was responsible for the formation of the faults. These structures underwent several periods of reactivation in subsequent geological processes.	(I) Dongjiang Delta fault block, (II) Tan Hoi fault block, (III) Wuguishan fault block, (IV) Shiqiao–Guangzhou fault block(I) and (VII) South China Sea fault block	Strong activities of the fault block; Center of deposition; Well preserved in the rock records and can be seen from field evidence.
7. Pearl River Estuary Fault	Strike-slip fault	NE-SW	The Yanshanian Movement in the Cretaceous period was responsible for the formation of the faults. These structures underwent several periods of reactivation in subsequent geological processes.	(I) Dongjiang Delta fault block, (II) Tan Hoi fault block, (III) Wuguishan fault block, (IV) Shiqiao–Guangzhou fault block(I) and (VII) South China Sea fault block	Strong activities of the fault block; Center of deposition; Well preserved in the rock records and can be seen from field evidence.
8. Xijiang Fault	Normal fault	NW-SE	The Himalayan Movement, which took place during the Oligocene-Pliocene epochs, was instrumental in the formation of these fault structures.	(V) Xijiang–Beijiang Delta fault block and (VI) Pearl River estuary fault block and	Weak activities of the fault block
9. Baini–Shawan Fault	Reverse fault	NW-SE	The Himalayan Movement, which took place during the Oligocene-Pliocene epochs, was instrumental in the formation of these fault structures.	(V) Xijiang–Beijiang Delta fault block and (VI) Pearl River estuary fault block and	Weak activities of the fault block
10. Nangang–Humen Fault	Strike-slip fault	NW-SE	The Himalayan Movement, which took place during the Oligocene-Pliocene epochs, was instrumental in the formation of these fault structures.	(V) Xijiang–Beijiang Delta fault block and (VI) Pearl River estuary fault block and	Weak activities of the fault block
11. Hualong–Huangge Fault	Normal fault	NW-SE	The Himalayan Movement, which took place during the Oligocene-Pliocene epochs, was instrumental in the formation of these fault structures.	(V) Xijiang–Beijiang Delta fault block and (VI) Pearl River estuary fault block and	Weak activities of the fault block
12. Yamen Fault	Strike-slip fault	NW-SE	The Himalayan Movement, which took place during the Oligocene-Pliocene epochs, was instrumental in the formation of these fault structures.	(V) Xijiang–Beijiang Delta fault block and (VI) Pearl River estuary fault block and	Weak activities of the fault block

== Stratigraphy ==
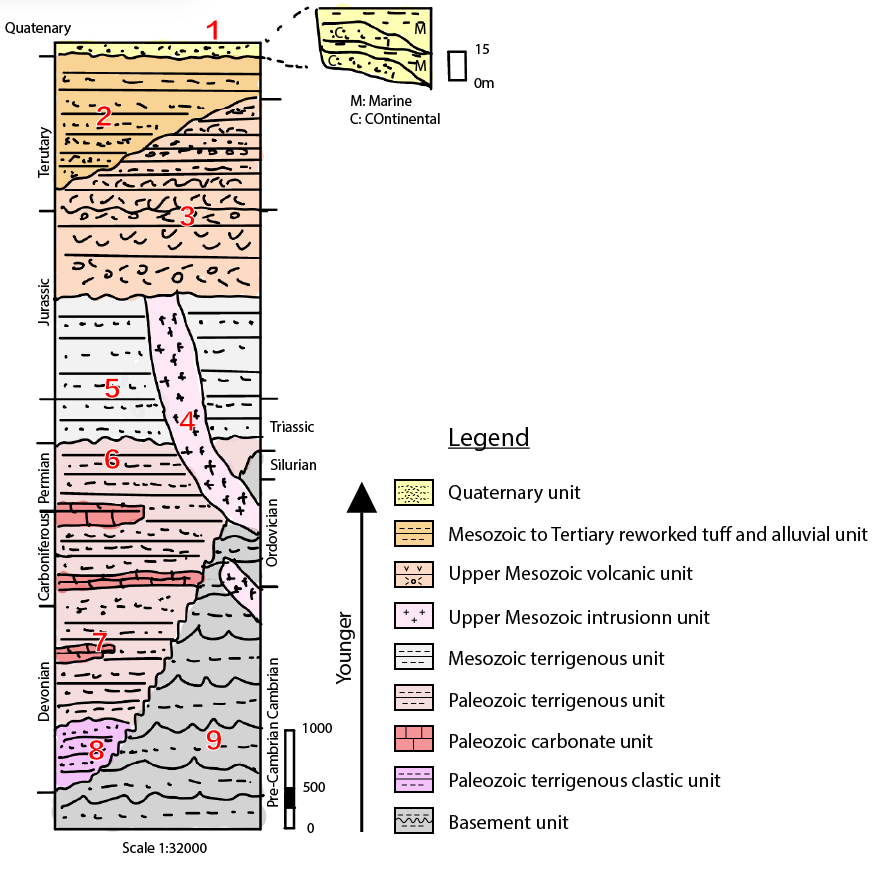
Fig.6 Stratigraphy of PRD. The units contain different kinds of rock that formed in distinct time periods.

The bedrock in the Pearl River Delta consists of very old rock dating back to the Precambrian and is complex in nature. This is a product of metamorphism and magmatic intrusion experienced by the sedimentary bedrock in the Pearl River Delta, caused by several major tectonic events. The stratigraphic sequence in Pearl River Delta mainly consisted of a Neo-Proterozoic meta-sedimentary basement unit with an overlying discontinuous rock record from Paleozoic to Mesozoic, composed of terrigenous sedimentary rock interbedded with some carbonate units. The volcanic and intrusive events that occurred during the Upper Mesozoic to Tertiary formed granites that intruded into these rock layers, and tuff formed on top of them. At the top, Quaternary deposits consisted of two continental units, and two marine units filled the depressed area in the region. This complex stratigraphy is grouped into nine rock units:

Rock units in Pearl River Delta
Periods	Unit name	Dominant rock types	Environment	Note
Quaternary	1. Quaternary unit	Loose deposits with a wide range of clasts, but with a majority of sand and silty sand	Delta	Length of the bed is 20-60m
Cretaceous to Tertiary	2. Mesozoic to Tertiary reworked tuff and alluvial unit	Reworked tuff breccia and conglomerate, interbedded with sandstone and shale	Lake, river, and alluvial fan	A sharp angular unconformity and red bed sedimentation
Jurassic to Cretaceous	3. Upper Mesozoic volcanic unit	Rhyo-porphyry, dacite Porphyry, quartz conglomerate, volcanic breccia, interbedded with layers of tuff, sandstone, shale, and siltstone	Volcanic arc	Ash tuff in Hong Kong
Jurassic to Cretaceous	4. Upper Mesozoic intrusion unit	Granite, diorite, and monzonite	Volcanic arc	Granite and rhyolite of calc-alkaline to high-K calc-alkaline series, the Luofushan pluton
Triassic to Jurassic	5. Mesozoic terrigenous unit	Siltstone and shale are interbedded with a sandstone layer	Lake	N/A
Carboniferous to Permian	6. Paleozoic terrigenous unit	Quartz sandstone with siltstone, marls, fine sandstone, and conglomerate	Lake, river, and alluvial fan	N/A
Carboniferous to Permian	7. Paleozoic carbonate unit	Limestone, dolostone, and carbonate marls	Shallow marine	N/A
Devonian	8. Paleozoic terrigenous clastic unit	Conglomerate, quartz conglomerate, quartz sandstone, and quartite	Lake, river, and alluvial fan	N/A
Silurian to Ediacaran	9. Basement unit	Slate, siliceous shales, graptolites shales, and graptolite shales with a layer of sandstone. And metamorphic facies such as phyllite, schist, and gneiss	Deep marine	N/A

== Geological history ==
The Geological history of the Pearl River Delta spans across 600 million years and can be divided into five main periods: the pre-Cretaceous period, the Cretaceous period, the Tertiary period, the Quaternary period, and the recent Holocene epoch.

=== Paleozoic and Neoproterozoic Era ===
In the Ediacaran period, approximately 600 million years ago, the region of the Pearl River Delta was characterized by a structurally depressed area within a deep marine environment. It is theorized that this region constituted an oceanic basin during that period, fostering a depositional environment that facilitated the formation of bioclastic and clastic sedimentary rock. In the Paleozoic eon, around 540 million years ago, the depositional environment underwent significant changes. The sedimentary facies formed during this period were markedly different from the Ediacaran bedrock, including notable examples such as shallow marine facies and terrigenous facies.

=== Mesozoic Era ===
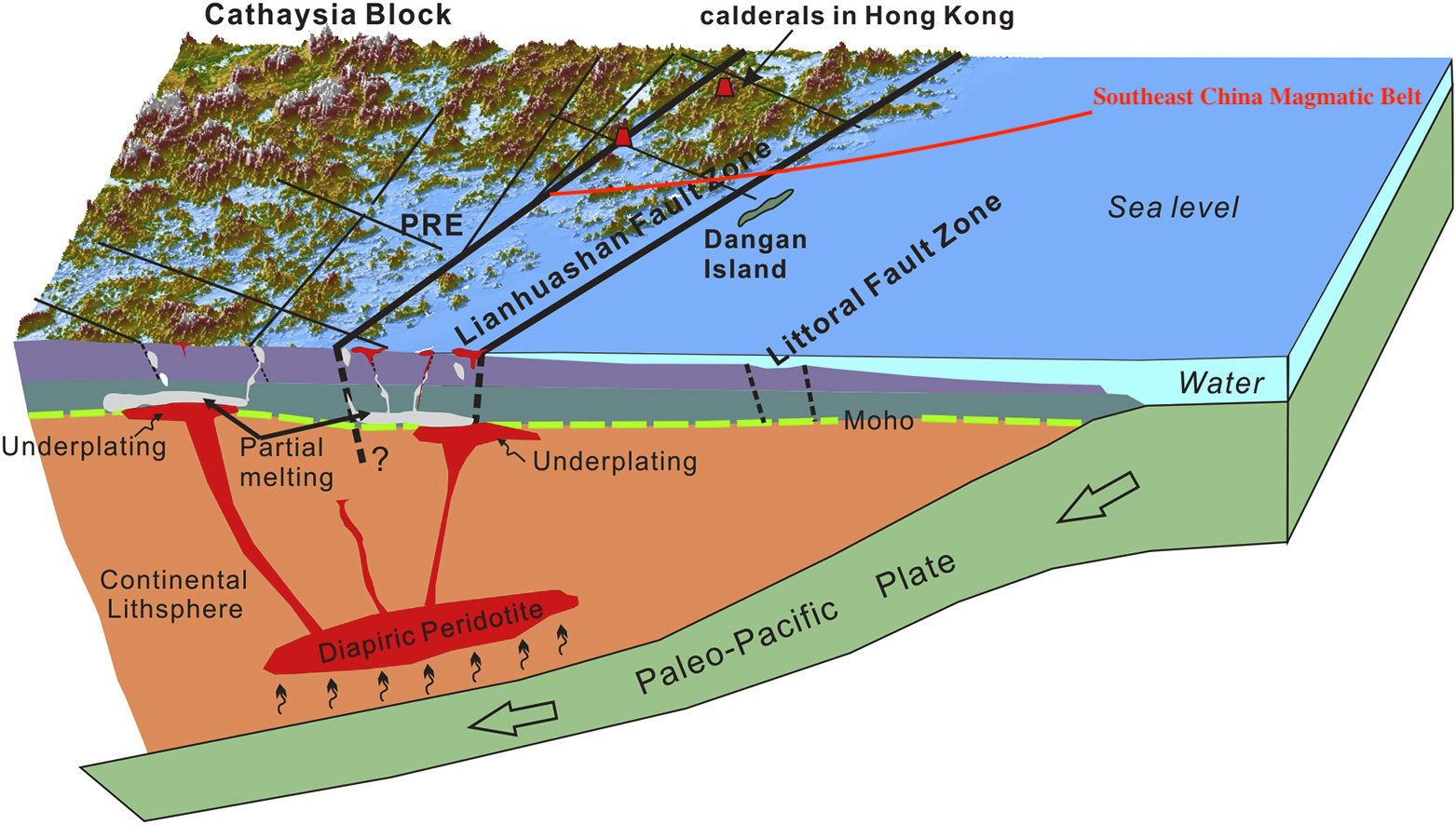
Fig.7 Conceptual block diagram showing how the subduction of the Paleo-Pacific Plate triggered the magmatic intrusion which formed the Mesozoic Magmatic Belt

The Mesozoic era, which began approximately 252 million years ago, was characterized by a primarily lacustrine environment consisting of terrestrial shale interbedded with sandstone. This sedimentation process persisted until substantial tectonic activities ushered in multiple phases of faulting and magmatic intrusion. From the Jurassic to the Cretaceous period, the westward subducting paleo-Pacific Plate triggered the Yanshanian movement, which led to the intrusion of granitic magma. The regional fault zones guided the intrusive motion of the magma, leading to the formation of the Mesozoic Magmatic Belt in SE China from the existing large-scale NE-SW fault zones. The granites and tuff, which are widely distributed in Hong Kong and the southeastern and eastern areas of the Pearl River Delta, are representative of this magmatic belt. These tectonic and magmatic events induced deformation of the Ediacaran bedrock through contact and regional metamorphism, transforming it into metasedimentary rock. This period also saw the rapid development of fault block mountains and fault basins. The effects of weathering and erosion led to the formation of hills and mountains from the fault blocks. The weathered material from these mountains was transported and deposited in the fault basins. Consequently, the evolving basin preserved records of marine transgression and volcanic activity by retaining both land and marine strata from the late Mesozoic to the early Tertiary period. The Himalayan movement, initiated by the collision of India with Asia since the middle Tertiary, uplifted the delta basin through rapid crustal modifications. This uplift facilitated erosion and incision, but the eroded material was not deposited in the Pearl River Delta. Instead, it was transported more than 200 km away from the delta area.

=== Cenozoic Era ===
Throughout the Tertiary and Quaternary periods, the uplift of the Tibetan Plateau significantly altered the topography, which in turn modified the drainage pattern and led to the formation of the Pearl River drainage basin. This geological event also initiated the rifting of several delta basins due to the movement of fault blocks, resulting in an overall subsidence of the basin adjacent to the estuary in the Late Quaternary. The subsidence of the deltaic region during the Late Quaternary created ample accommodation space, prompting a new phase of deposition and halting sediment bypassing to the adjacent continental shelf in the South China Sea. The interplay of repeated sea-level changes and subsidence from fault block movements led to the formation of two deltas at different times. As a result, two stratigraphic sequences were formed, each featuring a combination of terrestrial and marine sedimentary layers. These sequences rest atop sedimentary rocks that date back to the Cenozoic and Mesozoic periods, and are also underlain by Mesozoic igneous rocks.

- The older sequence of deltaic deposits dates back to the first cycle of marine regression and transgression during the last interglacial period, which occurred between 130,000 and 115,000 years ago.
- The more recent sequence of the deltaic deposits pertains to the second cycle of marine regression and transgression. This cycle has been ongoing during the current interglacial period, which spans from 11,500 years ago to the present day.

=== Evolutionary model in the Holocene ===
The modern configuration of the Pearl River Delta emerged during the second marine transgression, which took place approximately 7500 years ago. To elucidate the factors driving the evolution of the present delta, a three-stage evolutionary model has been proposed.

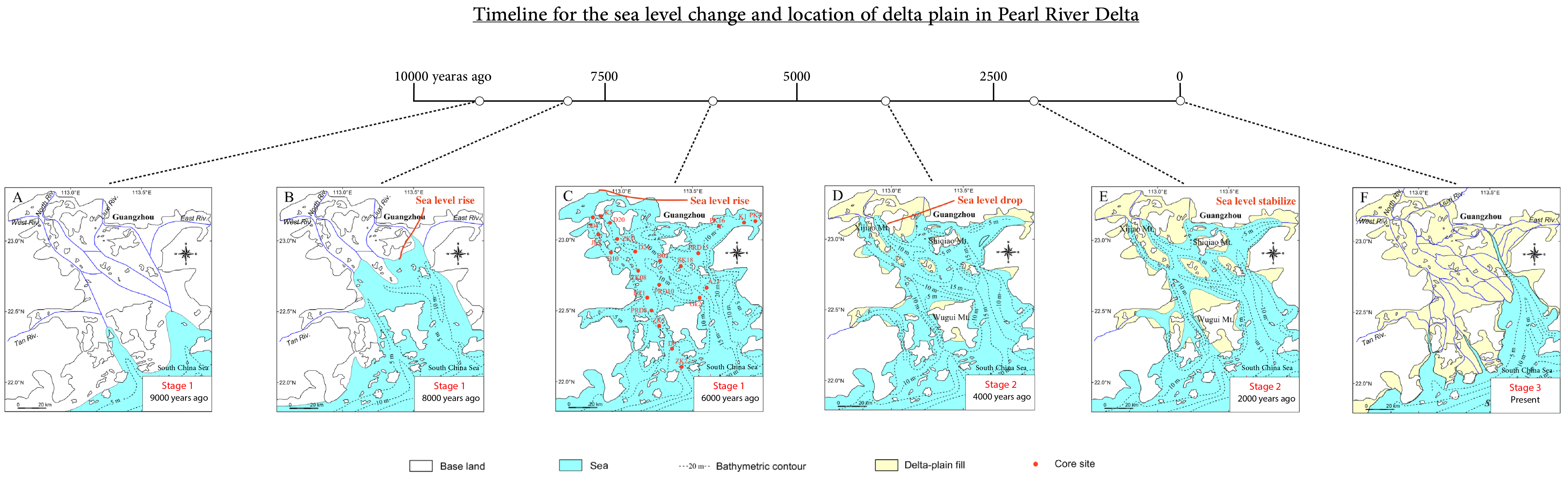
Fig.8 Showing the sea level change and location of delta plain through time. Figure A-C show the sea level change in stage 1. Figure D-E show the sea level change in stage 2. Figure F show the current shoreline.

==== Stage 1 (9000–6800 years ago) ====
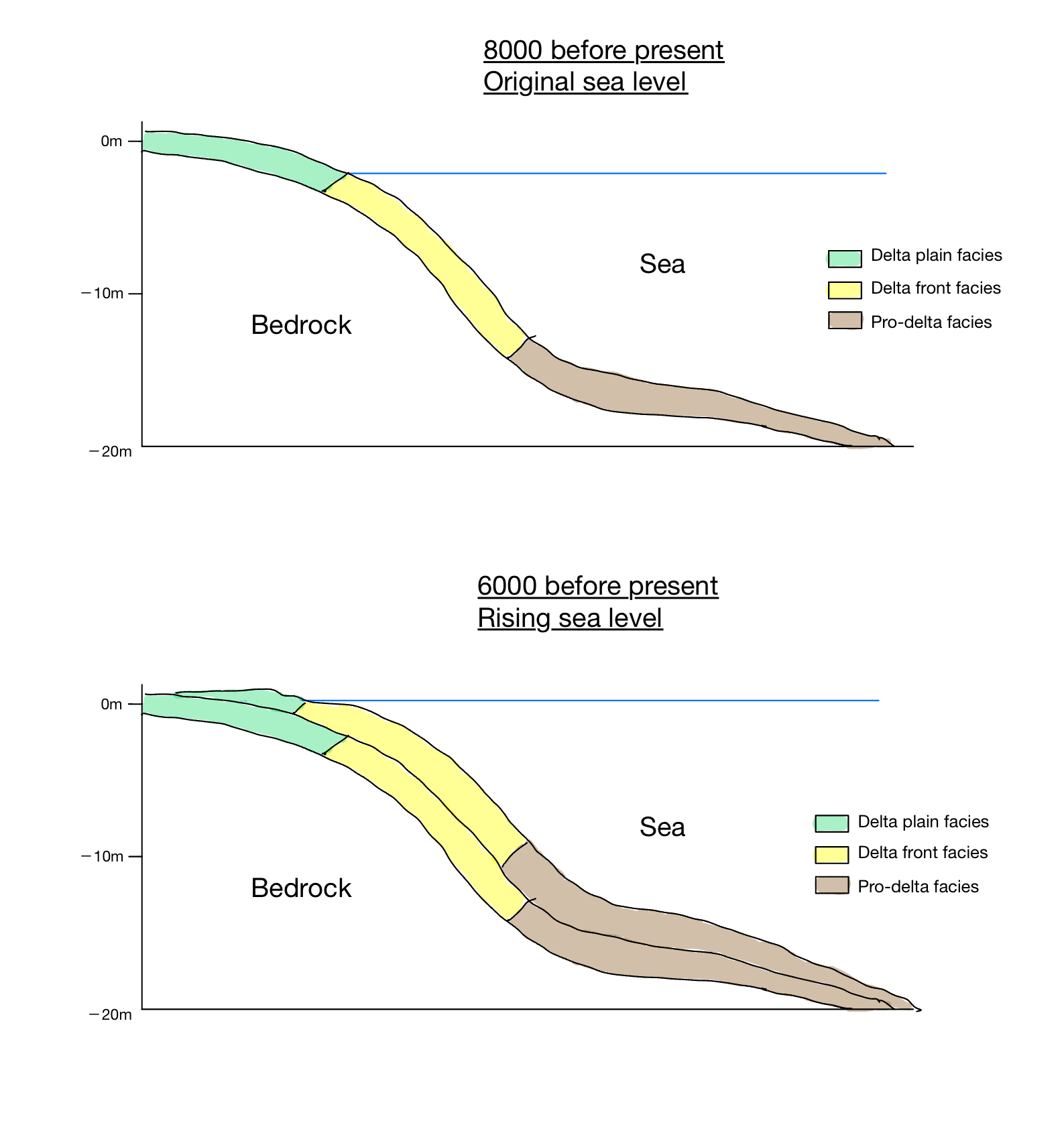
Fig.9 Schematic cross-section for the Pearl River deltaic sequences showing the sequence is retrograding with a rising sea level during 9000–6800 years ago

The swift environmental changes during the early Holocene were primarily driven by a rapid increase in sea level and, secondarily, by strong monsoon runoff. The interaction of these two factors resulted in flooding of the deltaic basin by seawater, leading to a shift in sedimentation facies from fine sand to silt and clay. This stage was characterized by a transition from shallow to deep tidal processes in the receiving basin. Subsequently, a transgression phase commenced around 8000 years ago, which, after approximately 1200 years (around 6800 years ago), transitioned into a regression phase.

==== Stage 2 (6800-2000 years ago) ====
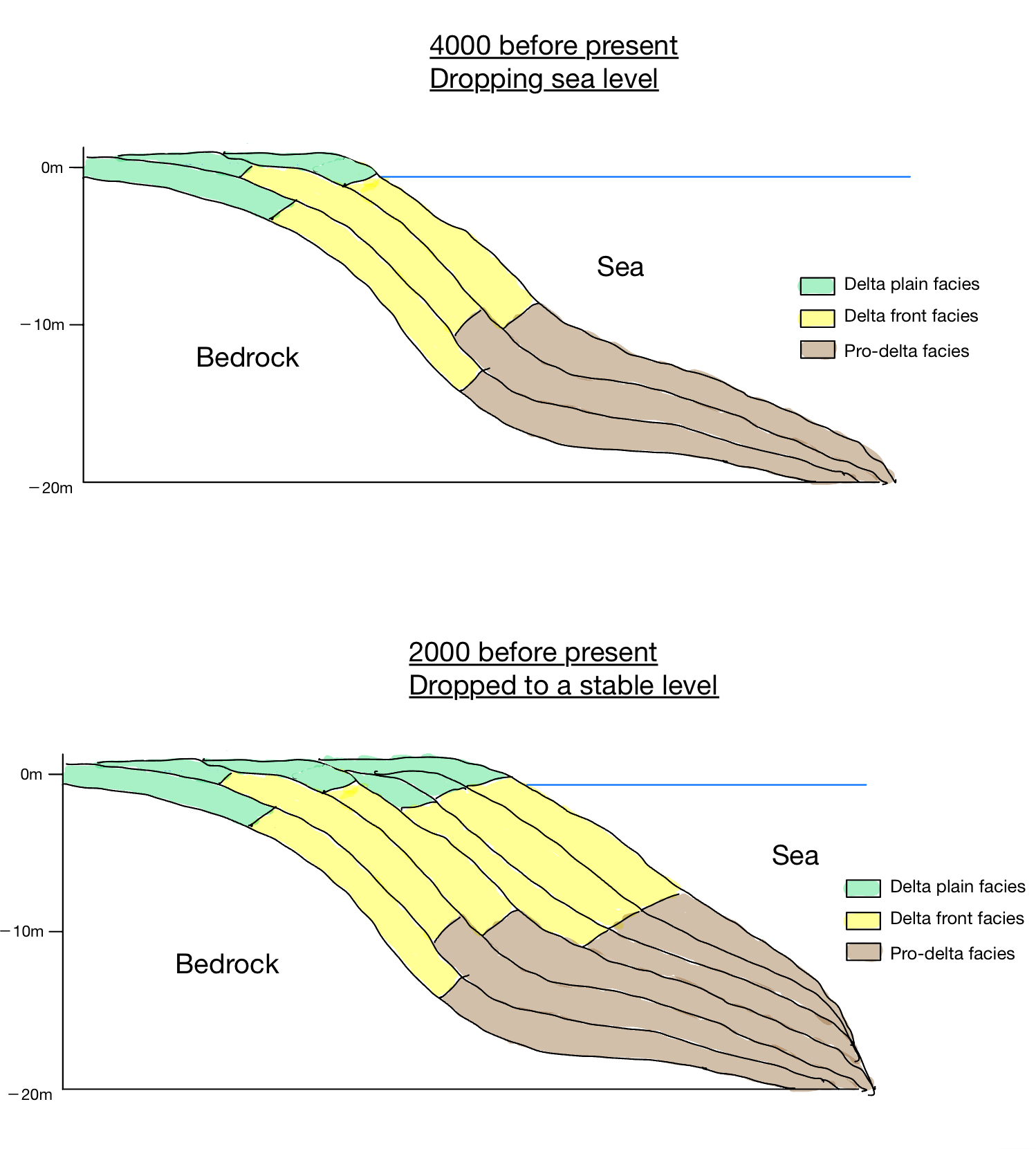
Fig.10 Schematic cross-section for the Pearl River deltaic sequences showing the sequence is prograding with a dropping sea level 4000 years ago, while the sequence is aggrading with a more stable sea level 2000 years ago

During the subsequent stage, tides and monsoonal discharge became the dominant mechanisms as the sea level began to stabilize. These factors spurred the delta's growth until approximately 6000 years ago, a process driven by the continuous weakening of the summer monsoon. From this point onwards, the delta front facies transitioned to become the primary sedimentary facies, which allowed for the modification of sediments by tidal action.

==== Stages 3 (2000 years ago-present) ====
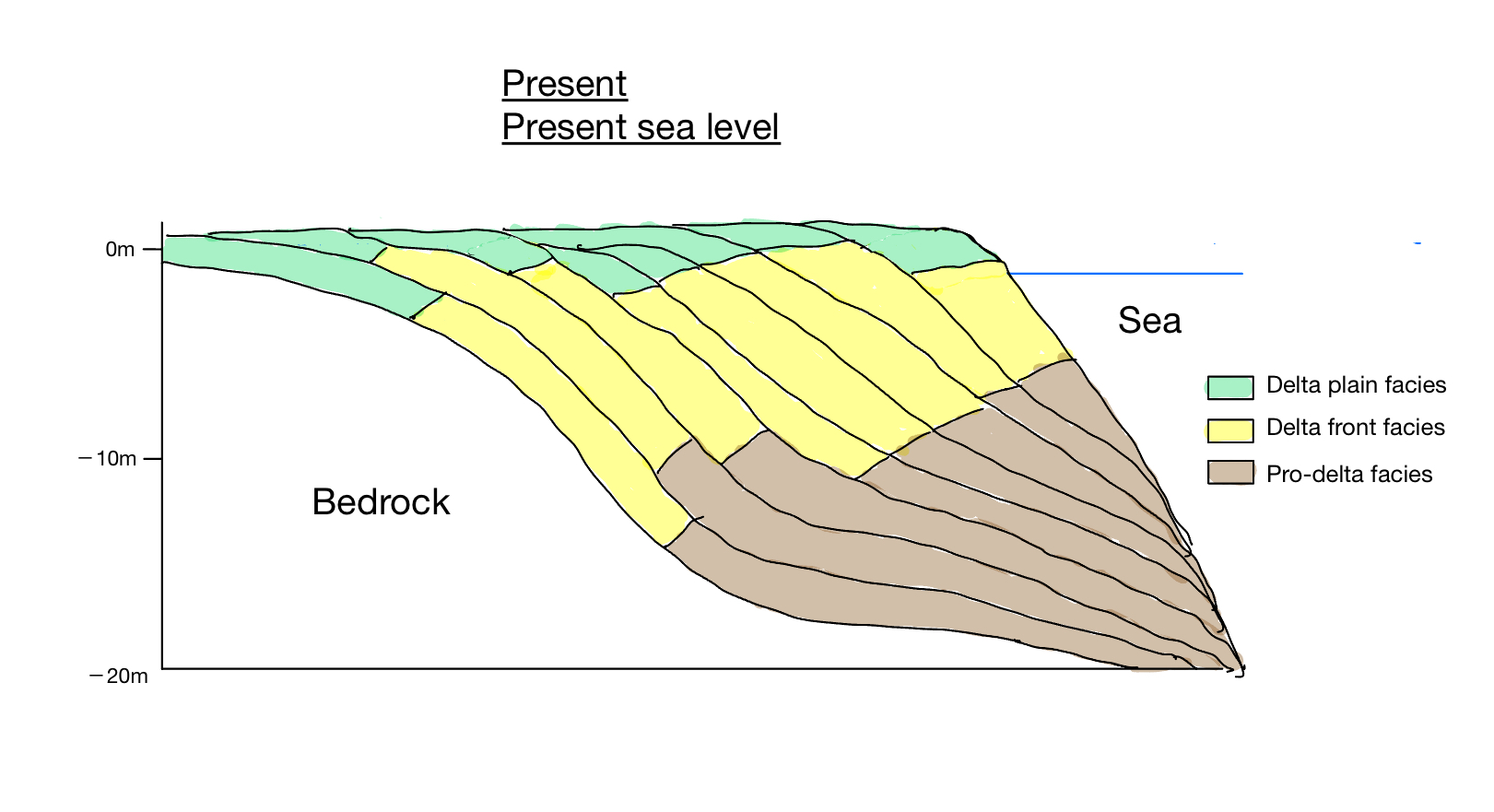
Fig.11 Schematic cross-section for the Pearl River deltaic sequences showing the sequence in the present environment

As the impact of monsoonal discharge continued to weaken and human activities increased, these human activities became a significant factor during this stage. Despite an increase in sediment supply due to deforestation, most sediments were trapped in reclaimed land or tidal flats. A decrease in the rate of vertical accretion was noted, likely due to a reduction in the amount of sediment reaching the estuary. This could be attributed to the rapid advancement of the shoreline caused by swift land reclamation.

This model reveals a continuous advance of the Pearl River Delta's shoreline, a trend driven by increased human activities and decreased influence of natural factors such as sea-level changes and monsoonal discharges.

== Current geological issues ==
The Pearl River Delta faces two significant geological issues: pollution and subsidence.

=== Water pollution ===
The primary sources of contamination are chemical spillages, unauthorized factory discharges, and urban water-logging. These human activities significantly affect the groundwater dynamics, rendering the confined aquifer increasingly susceptible to pollution. As a result, it is advised to abstain from exploiting deep confined aquifers if shallow aquifers are already polluted. To safeguard the crucial groundwater resources around the Pearl River Delta, implementing best practices, such as constructing more efficient water treatment plants and using clean water for irrigation, is recommended.

=== Land subsidence ===
Subsidence represents the second significant issue experienced in the Pearl River Delta. Although surface subsidence is a natural part of the geological evolution of the area, human activities within the deltaic region have accelerated this process. The extent of this acceleration can be quantified through InSAR (Interferometric Synthetic Aperture Radar), a remote sensing technology. According to InSAR data, an average subsidence velocity of 5 cm/year was observed in some regions, a rate significantly higher than those reported in earlier studies.

== See also ==
- Pearl River Delta
- Pearl River
- Mississippi River Delta
