= List of mines in China =

This list of mines in China is subsidiary to the list of mines article and lists working, defunct and future mines in the country and is organised by the primary mineral output. For practical purposes stone, marble and other quarries may be included in this list.

== Antimony ==
- Xikuangshan Mine

== Boron ==
- Wengquangou mine

== Copper ==
- Tonglushan mine

== Gold ==
- Jinfeng Gold Mine
- Zaozigou Gold Mine
- Sanshandao Gold Mine
- Dexing Mine
- Shaxi Copper Mine

== Graphite ==
- Liumao mine
- Pingdu mine

== Iron ==
- Baizhiyan mine
- Baoguosi mine
- Benxi mine
- Gongchangling mine
- Jinling mine
- Ma On Shan Iron Mine
- Pangjiapu mine
- Sanheming mine
- Shuichang mine
- Sijiaying mine
- Tadong mine
- Wuenduermiao mine
- Yuanjiachun mine
- Zhalanzhangzhi mine

== Lead and Zinc ==
- Caijiaying mine
- Hongtoushan mine
- Huanren mine
- Huogeqi mine
- Huoshaoyun
- Qingchengzi mine
- Tianbaoshan mine

== Lithium ==
- Jiajika mine

== Fluorite ==
- Hushan mine
- Shizhuyuan mine
- Sumoqagan mine
- Taolin mine

== Magnesium ==
- Xiafangshen mine

== Manganese ==
- Wafangzi mine

== Mercury ==
- Lanmuchang

== Molybdenum ==
- Yangjiazhangzi mine
- Yichun Luming mine

== Niobium ==
- Bayan Obo mine

== Platinum ==
- Kalatongke mine

== Stone ==
- Yangshan Quarry

== Tantalum ==
- Nanping mine
- Tongliao mine
- Yichun mine

== Tungsten ==
- Taoxikeng mine

== Vanadium ==
- Damiao mine

== See also ==
- Mining industry of China
- Mining in Asia
