= Hou Feng =

Chinese engineer (1928–2020)

- Born: February 3, 1928; Pingdu, Shandong, China
- Died: November 7, 2020 (aged 92); Tianjin, China
- Education: China Agricultural University
- Scientific career
- Fields: Plant breeding
- Workplaces: Tianjin Academy of Agricultural Sciences (TAAS)

Chinese name
- Traditional Chinese: 侯鋒
- Simplified Chinese: 侯锋
Transcriptions
Standard Mandarin
- Hanyu Pinyin: Hóu Fēng

Hou Feng (Chinese: 侯锋; 3 February 1928 – 7 November 2020) was a Chinese engineer specializing in plant breeding. He was known for his disease resistant cucumber, which earned him the nickname "Cucumber King" (黄瓜王). He was a member of the Chinese Academy of Agricultural Sciences (CAAS) and Chinese Society for Horticultural Science (CSHS), and an academician of the Chinese Academy of Engineering (CAE). He was a member of the 6th, 7th and 8th National Committee of the Chinese People's Political Consultative Conference.

== Biography ==
Hou was born in Pingdu, Shandong, on February 3, 1928. In September 1950, he was accepted to China Agricultural University, where he majored in the Department of Horticulture. After graduating in July 1954, he was dispatched to the Tianjin Agriculture, Forestry and Water Conservancy Bureau. He was transferred to Tianjin Vegetable Research Institute, in October 1955, becoming research director in October 1969 and deputy director in October 1979. After the institutional reform, he served as the vice-president of the Tianjin Academy of Agricultural Sciences (TAAS) in August 1983. He was also director of Tianjin Cucumber Research Institute between May 1985 and March 1998. He served as honorary president of Tianjin Academy of Agricultural Sciences since March 1998. He died of illness in Tianjin, on November 7, 2020.

== Honours and awards ==
- 1999 Member of the Chinese Academy of Engineering (CAE)
- 2002 National Labor Medal
