= Zhongyuan =

Zhongyuan 中原 Chungyuan, Central Plain
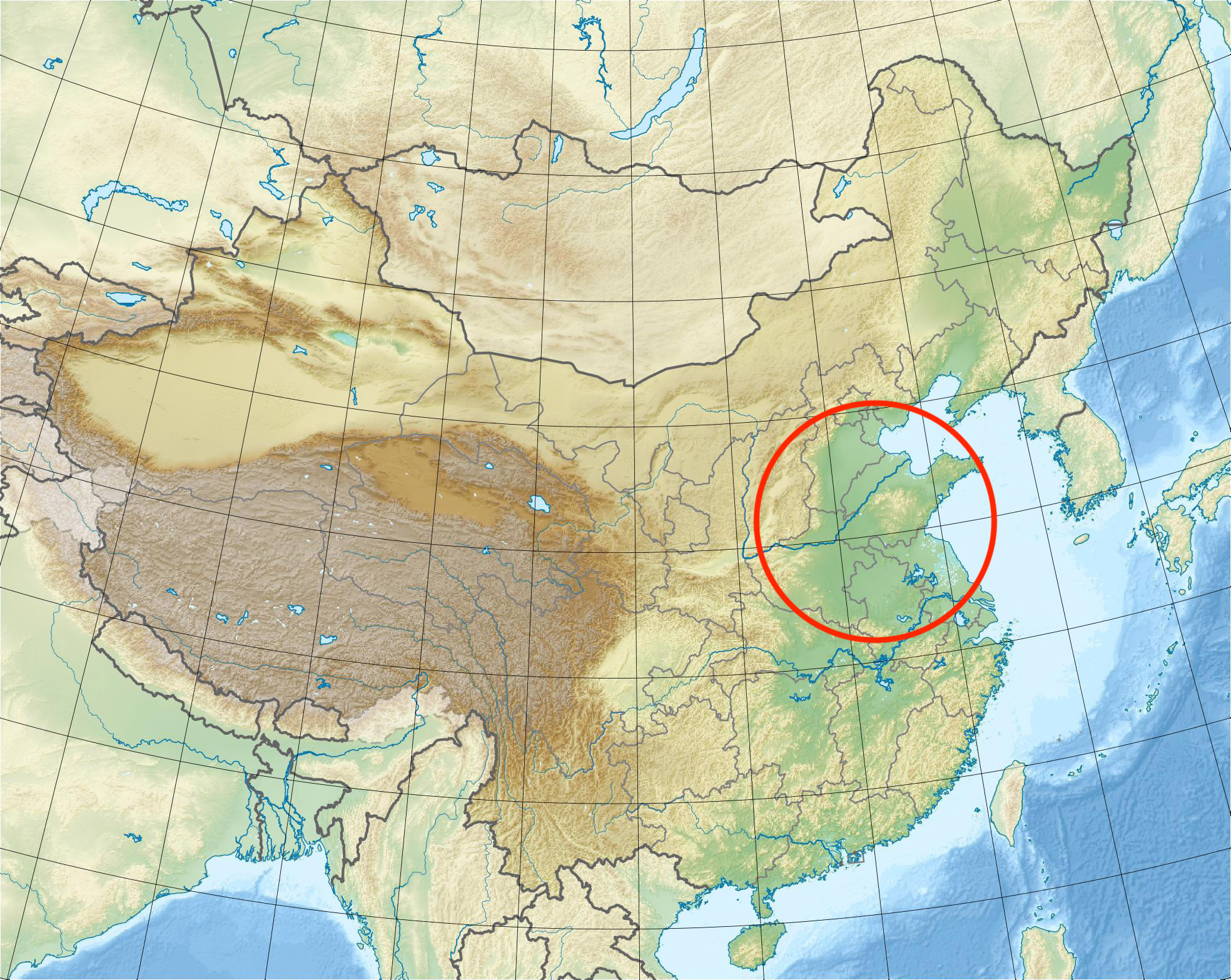
- Map showing the province of Henan and two definitions of the Central Plain or Zhongyuan
- Country: China
- Provinces: Henan; Parts of Shandong, Hebei, Shanxi, Shaanxi, and Anhui

Zhongyuan (Chinese: 中原; pinyin: Zhōngyuán, formerly romanized as Chungyuan), the Central Plain(s), also known as Zhongtu (Chinese: 中土; pinyin: Zhōngtǔ, lit. 'central land') and Zhongzhou (Chinese: 中州; pinyin: Zhōngzhōu, lit. 'central region'), commonly refers to the part of the North China Plain surrounding the lower and middle reaches of the Yellow River, centered on the region between Luoyang and Kaifeng. It has been perceived as the birthplace of the Chinese civilization. Historically, the Huaxia people viewed Zhongyuan as 'the center of the world'. Human activities in the Zhongyuan region can be traced back to the Palaeolithic period.

In prehistoric times, Huaxia, a confederation of tribes that later developed into the Han ethnicity, lived along the middle and lower reaches of the Yellow River. The term 'Zhongguo' (Central State) was used to distinguish themselves from the Siyi tribes that were perceived as 'barbaric'. For a large part of Chinese history, Zhongyuan had been the political, economic, and cultural center of the Chinese civilization, as over 20 dynasties had located their capitals in this region.

In the modern concept, the term 'Central Plains Region' is used to define the Zhongyuan area. In a narrow sense, it refers to the present-day Henan Province in the central part of China. A broader interpretation of the Central Plains' measure would also include Henan's neighborhood provinces, Shaanxi, Hebei, Shanxi, and Shandong, as well as the northern part of Anhui and the northwestern part of Jiangsu.

== Geography ==
Map of Zhongyuan

The north, west, and south sides of Zhongyuan are encircled by mountains, predominantly the Taihang Mountains from the northwestern side, Funiu and Xionger Mountains to the west. The central and eastern areas of Zhongyuan form part of the North China Plain. The Yellow River flows through the region from west to east. The Huai River and Hai River, as well as Tributaries of the Yangtze River, also pass through Zhongyuan. Since ancient times, Zhongyuan has been a strategically important site of China, regarded as 'The center and hub of the world'.

The alluvial deposits of the Yellow River formed the vast plains of Zhongyuan in the Palaeozoic period. The region has sufficient water resources for plant growth, making it the center of the Chinese agrarian civilization, known as the 'Breadbasket of China'.

Zhongyuan has a temperate monsoon climate with distinct seasons. It is usually hot and humid during the summer, cold and dry in the winter.

== Definition ==
The concept of Zhongyuan had often been changing in different historical periods, under different contexts. The term Zhongyuan first appeared in the Classic of Poetry not specifying any exact geographic locations. It was during the Spring and Autumn period (770–476 BC) that the word came to denote the Central Plains region. Only until the Northern and Southern dynasties (420–589 AD) onward, the term 'Zhongyuan' were widely accepted as a geographical concept.

The geographical view of Zhongyuan may depict different regions. It usually refers to the middle and lower reaches of the Yellow River, but sometimes also encompasses the reaches along the Yangtze and Huai River, and even the whole North China Plain.

Apart from being a geographical location, the term 'Zhongyuan' is also used as a historical and cultural concept that represents the dominance of the Han ethnicity.

In older texts, 'Zhongguo' (中國; 'Middle Kingdom') is used as a synonym for the Central Plains. Today, 'Zhongguo' refers to the country of China. Other archaic synonyms include 'Zhongtu' (中土; 'Middle Earth') and 'Zhongzhou' (中州; 'Middle Province'). (Note: The Book of Jin sometimes uses 'Zhongguo' used to mean the Central Plains: "時中國亡官失守之士避亂來者，多居顯位，駕御吳人，吳人頗怨。" It also sometimes uses 'Zhongguo' and 'Zhongyuan' differently: "嘗慷慨謂其下曰：'大丈夫生不在中國，當高光之世，與韓、彭、吳、鄧並驅中原，定天下雌雄'")

== History ==
The history of Zhongyuan can be dated back to prehistoric times. There were traces of human activities in Zhongyuan about half a million years ago. Archaeological studies have shown that as far back as 80,000 to 100,000 years ago, the ancient people of Zhongyuan were using stone tools. The excavation of painted pottery and stone tools found from relics of Yangshao culture (5000 to 3000 BC) and Longshan culture (3000 to 1900 BC) prove that Zhongyuan was in the forefront of Chinese civilization throughout the Stone Age.

After the rise of Erlitou culture (1900 to 1500 BC), Zhongyuan entered the Bronze Age. The emergence of private ownership and social classes led to the formation of the first dynasty in Chinese history, the Xia dynasty. The Xia dynasty established its regime centered on Zhongyuan, setting the tone for later dynasties to make Zhongyuan the central region.

From the rise of the Xia dynasty (c. 2070–c. 1600 BC) to the fall of the Song dynasty (960–1279), most of the legitimate dynasties established their capitals within the Zhongyuan area, except for Eastern Jin and the Southern Song. It was not until the Yuan (1271–1368) and Ming dynasties (1368–1644) that the political center of China re-located, as the Mongol Empire established the Yuan dynasty in Dadu (Khanbaliq, now Beijing). Later, Yongle Emperor of the Ming dynasty moved the capital at his power base in Beijing.

== Language ==
Central Plains Mandarin (or Zhongyuan Mandarin) is the major language and native tongue spoken in the Zhongyuan region. It is a variety of Mandarin Chinese, formed and developed gradually based on the standard pronunciations of Mandarin and its predecessor, Yayan.

In the Yuan dynasty, the rime book Zhongyuan Yinyun (Rhymes of the Central Plains) written by Zhou Deqing reflected the standard pronunciation of Early Mandarin. Some linguists argue that the Early Mandarin recorded in Zhongyuan Yinyun was based on the pronunciation standards derived from the Luoyang and Bianliang dialects of Zhongyuan, which had been prevalent in the Song dynasty.

In modern China, Central Plains Mandarin is mainly used in Henan, Shandong, Anhui, Shanxi, Shaanxi, Gansu, and Hebei. The population of native Central Plains Mandarin speakers is approximately 124 million.

In terms of tone, the key characteristics of modern Central Plains Mandarin are: The neutral and aspirated voiced initial consonants of entering tone in Early Mandarin are now pronounced as the first tone (high tone), and voiced initial consonants of entering tone in Early Mandarin are now pronounced as the second tone (rising tone).

== See also ==
- North China Plain
- Yangtze River Delta
- Bohai Economic Rim
- Central Plains Mandarin
- China proper
- Huaxia
- Pingyuan Province
- Zhongyuansaurus
- Zhongyuan culture
- Chungyuan Time Zone
