= North China Craton =

Continental crustal block in China, Inner Mongolia, the Yellow Sea, and North Korea

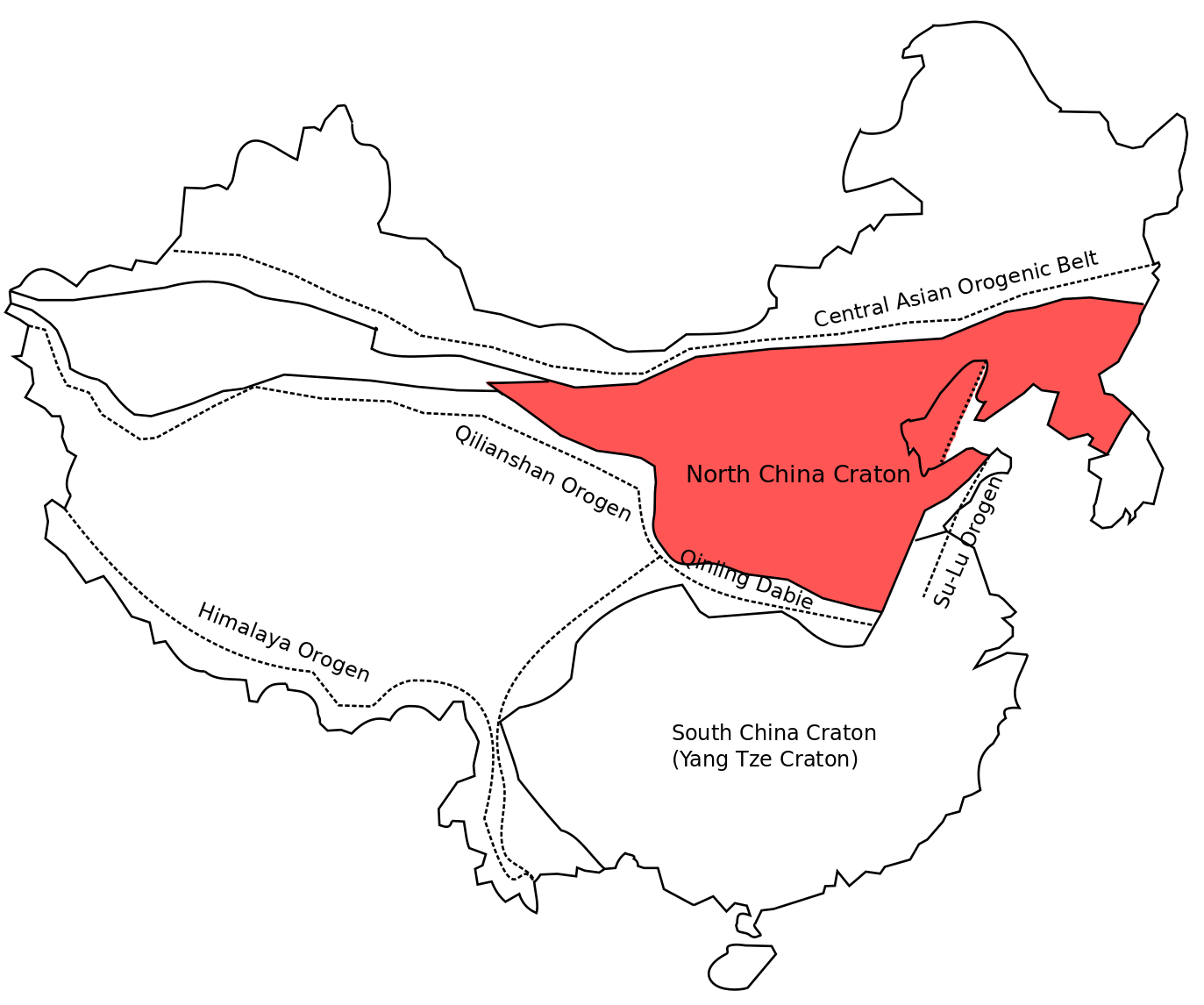
Tectonic elements surrounding the North China Craton. The North China Craton covers an area of around 1.7 million km^{2} in northeastern China, Inner Mongolia, the Yellow Sea, and North Korea. Edited from Kusky, 2007 and Zhao et al., 2005

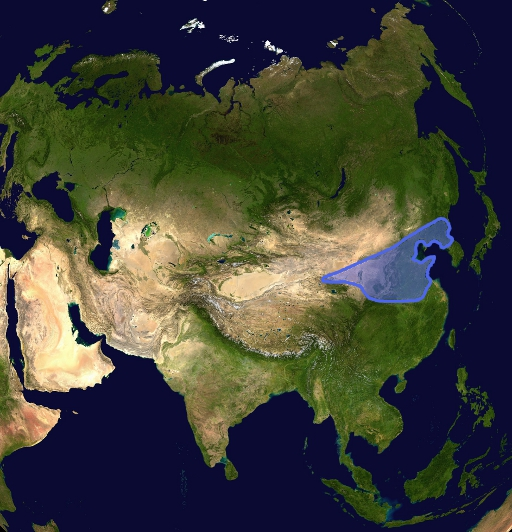
The location of the North China Craton in Asia.

The North China Craton is a continental crustal block with one of Earth's most complete and complex records of igneous, sedimentary and metamorphic processes. It is located in northeast China, Inner Mongolia, the Yellow Sea, and North Korea. The term craton designates this as a piece of continent that is stable, buoyant and rigid. Basic properties of the cratonic crust include being thick (around 200 km), relatively cold when compared to other regions, and low density. The North China Craton is an ancient craton, which experienced a long period of stability and fitted the definition of a craton well. However, the North China Craton later experienced destruction of some of its deeper parts (decratonization), which means that this piece of continent is no longer as stable.

The North China Craton was at first some discrete, separate blocks of continents with independent tectonic activities. In the Paleoproterozoic (2.5–1.8 billion years ago) the continents collided and amalgamated and interacted with the supercontinent, creating belts of metamorphic rocks between the formerly separate parts. The exact process of how the craton was formed is still under debate. After the craton was formed, it stayed stable until the middle of the Ordovician period (480 million years ago). The roots of the craton were then destabilised in the Eastern Block and entered a period of instability. The rocks formed in the Archean and Paleoproterozoic eons (4.6–1.6 billion years ago) were significantly overprinted during the root destruction.

Apart from the records of tectonic activities, the craton also contains important mineral resources, such as iron ores and rare earth elements, and fossils records of evolutionary development.

== Tectonic setting ==
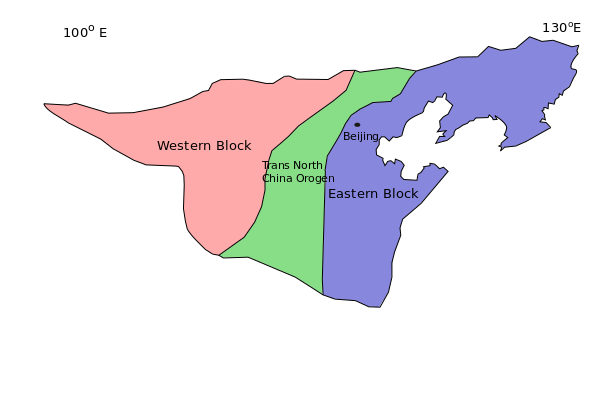
North China Craton consists of two blocks, the western and The Eastern Block, which are separated by a Trans-North China Orogen. The two blocks are of distinct characteristic.

The North China Craton covers approximately 1,500,000 km^{2} (580,000 sq mi) in area and its boundaries are defined by several mountain ranges (orogenic belts), the Central Asian Orogenic Belt to the north, the Qilianshan Orogen to the west, Qinling Dabie Orogen to the south and Su-Lu Orogen to the east. The intracontinental orogen Yan Shan belt ranges from east to west in the northern part of the craton.

The North China Craton consists of two blocks, the Western Block and the Eastern Block, separated by the 100–300 km (62–186 mi) wide Trans North China Orogen, which is also called Central Orogenic Belt or Jinyu Belt. The Eastern Block covers areas including southern Anshan-Benxi, eastern Hebei, southern Jilin, northern Liaoning, Miyun-Chengdu and western Shandong. Tectonic activities, such as earthquakes, increased since craton root destruction started in the Phanerozoic. The Eastern Block is defined by high heat flow, thin lithosphere and a lot of earthquakes. It experienced a number of earthquakes with a magnitude of over 8 on the Richter scale, claiming millions of lives. The thin mantle root, which is the lowest part of lithosphere, is the reason for its instability. The thinning of the mantle root caused the craton to destabilize, weakening the seismogenic layer, which then allows earthquakes to happen in the crust. The Eastern Block may once have had a thick mantle root, as shown by xenolith evidence, but this seems to have been thinned during the Mesozoic. The Western Block is located in Helanshan-Qianlishan, Daqing-Ulashan, Guyang-Wuchuan, Sheerteng and Jining. It is stable because of the thick mantle root. Little internal deformation occurred here since Precambrian.

== Geology ==
The rocks in the North China craton consist of Precambrian (4.6 billion years ago to 539 million years ago) basement rocks, with the oldest zircon dated 4.1 billion years ago and the oldest rock dated 3.8 billion years ago. The Precambrian rocks were then overlain by Phanerozoic (539 million years ago to present) sedimentary rocks or igneous rocks. The Phanerozoic rocks are largely not metamorphosed. The Eastern Block is made up of early to late Archean (3.8–3.0 billion years ago) tonalite-trondhjemite-granodiorite gneisses, granitic gneisses, some ultramafic to felsic volcanic rocks and metasediments with some granitoids which formed in some tectonic events 2.5 billion years ago. These are overlain by Paleoproterozoic rocks which were formed in rift basins. The Western Block consists of an Archean (2.6–2.5 billion years ago) basement which comprises tonalite-trondhjemite-granodiorite, mafic igneous rock, and metamorphosed sedimentary rocks. The Archean basement is overlain unconformably by Paleoproterozoic khondalite belts, which consist of different types of metamorphic rocks, such as graphite-bearing sillimanite garnet gneiss. Sediments were widely deposited in the Phanerozoic with various properties, for example, carbonate and coal bearing rocks were formed in the late Carboniferous to early Permian (307–270 million years ago), when purple sand-bearing mudstones were formed in a shallow lake environment in the Early to Middle Triassic. Apart from sedimentation, there were six major stages of magmatism after the Phanerozoic decratonization. In Jurassic to Cretaceous (100–65 million years ago) sedimentary rocks were often mixed with volcanic rocks due to volcanic activities.

== Tectonic evolution ==
The North China Craton experienced complex tectonic events throughout the Earth's history. The most important deformation events are how the micro continental blocks collided and amalgamated to form the craton, and different phases of metamorphism during Precambrian time from around 3 to 1.6 billion years ago. In Mesozoic to Cenozoic time (146–2.6 million years ago), the Precambrian basement rocks were extensively reworked or reactivated.

=== Precambrian Tectonics (4.6 billion years ago to 1.6 billion years ago) ===
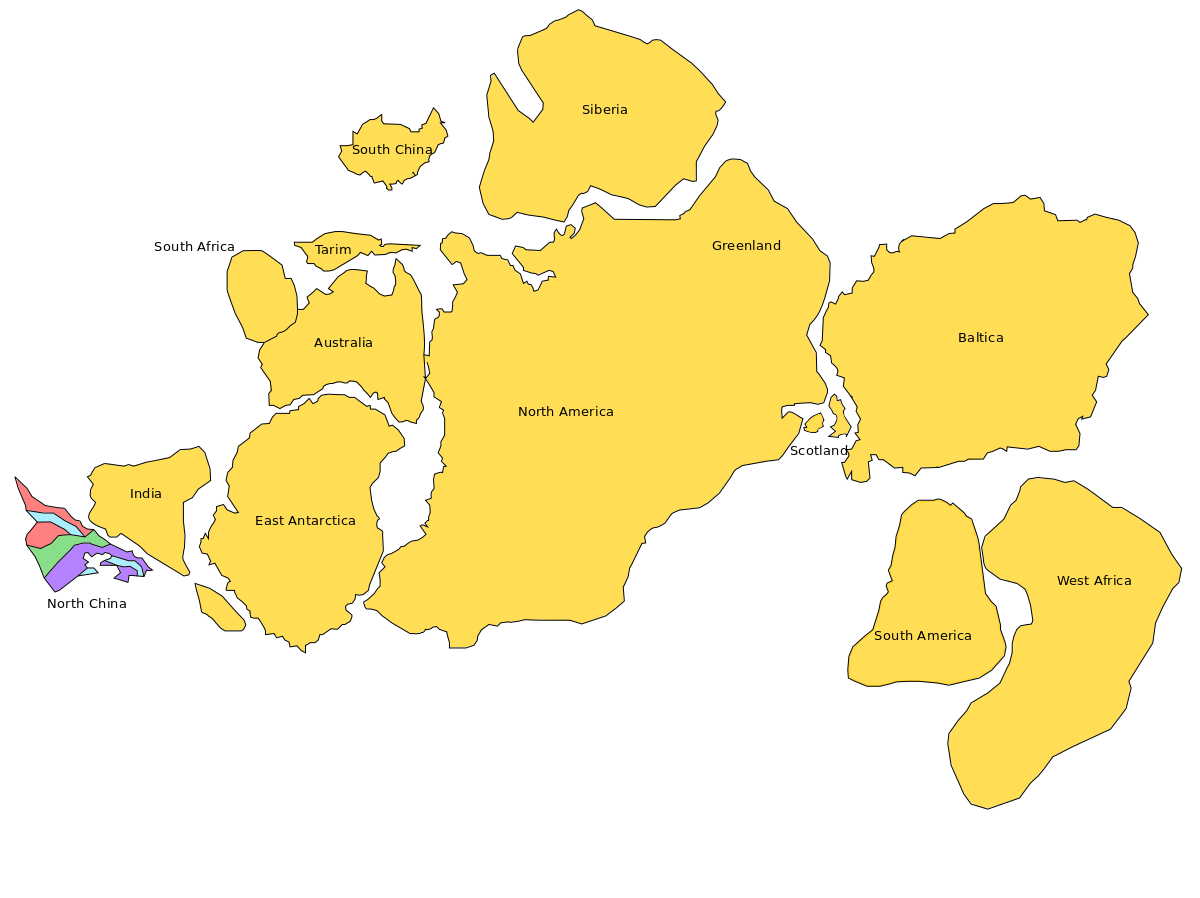
A diagram of Columbia Supercontinent, which occurred in Precambrian time. The red part is the Western Block of the North China Craton, the purple part is the Eastern Block, the green part is the Trans-North China Orgen, and the blue part is other collision belts found in the North China Craton. Modified from Zhao et al., 2011 and Santosh, 2010.

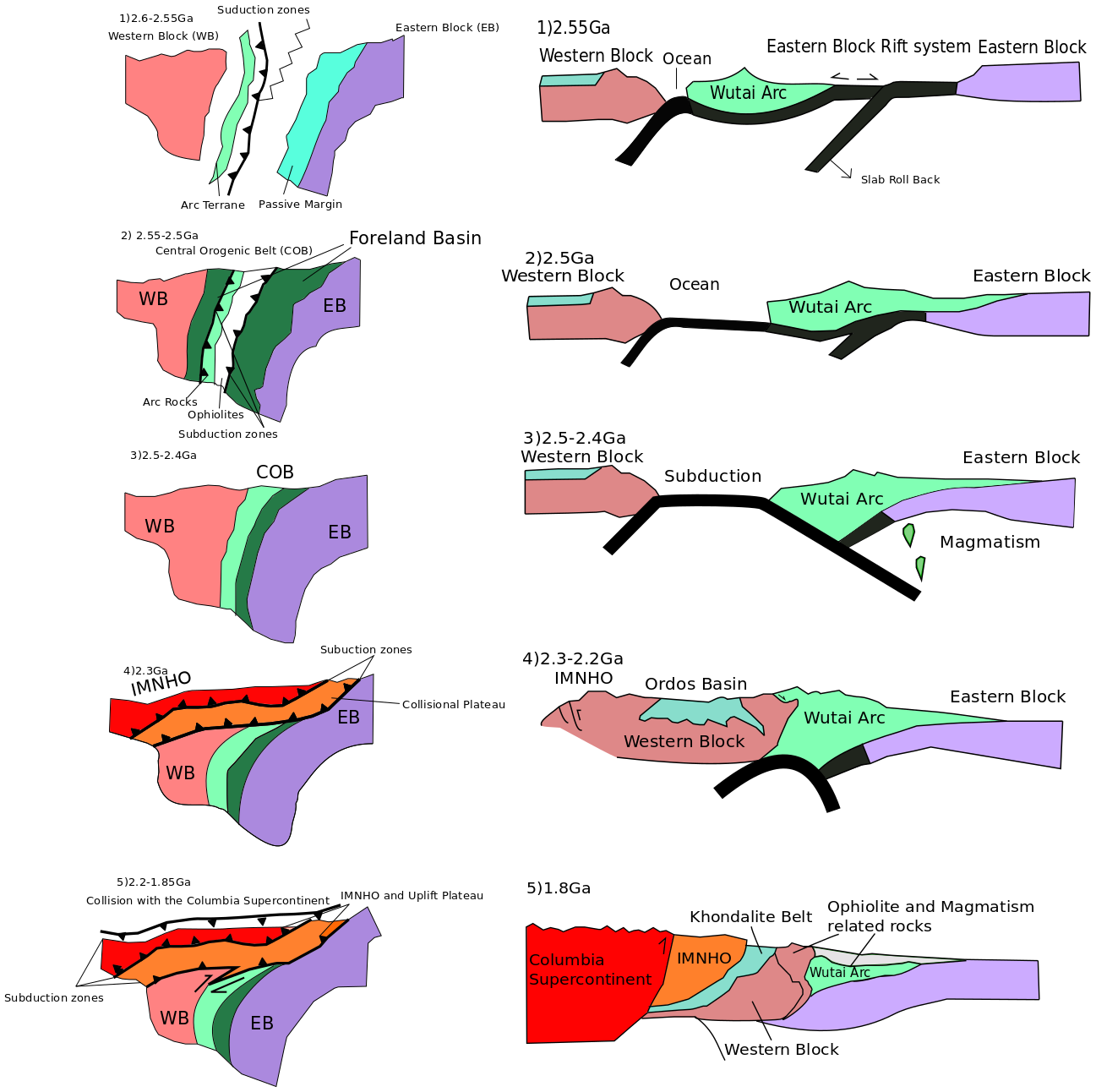
Evolutionary diagram of the 2.5 Ga^{[a]} Craton amalgamation model (1st model) (Inner Mongolia-Northern Hebei Orogen) 1)–2) There was an ancient rift system caused by retreating subduction in the Eastern Block, which then later stopped. 3) A subduction zone developed between the Eastern and Western blocks, with some magma plumes developed and exhumed as the plate was subducted. The North China Craton finally amalgamated. 4) The Western Block further interacted with an arc terrane in the north with a subduction zone and formed the Inner Mongolia-Northern Hebei Orogen. 5) The North China Craton collided with the Columbia Supercontinent, causing deformation and metamorphism in the region. Modified from Kusky, 2011 and Kusky, 2003

The Precambrian tectonics of the North China Craton is complicated. Different scholars have proposed different models to explain the tectonics of the Craton, with two dominant schools of thought coming from Kusky (2003, 2007, 2010) and Zhao (2000, 2005, and 2012). The major difference in their models is the interpretation of the two most significant Precambrian metamorphic events, occurring 2.5 billion years ago and 1.8 billion years ago respectively, in the North China Craton. Kusky argued that the metamorphic event 2.5 billion years ago corresponded to the amalgamation of the Craton from their ancient blocks, while Zhao argued that the later event was responsible for the amalgamation.

==== Kusky's Model: The 2.5 Ga craton amalgamation model ====
Kusky's model proposed a sequence of events showing the microblocks amalgamating 2.5 billion years ago. First, in the Archean time (4.6–2.5 billion years ago), the lithosphere of the craton started to develop. Some ancient micro-blocks amalgamated to form the Eastern and Western Blocks 3.8 to 2.7 billion years ago. The formation time of the blocks is determined based on the age of the rocks found in the craton. Most rocks in the craton were formed at around 2.7 billion years ago, with some small outcrops found to have formed 3.8 billion years ago. Then, the Eastern Block underwent deformation, rifting at the Western Edge of the Block 2.7 to 2.5 billion years ago. Evidences for a rift system have been found in the Central Orogenic Belt and they were dated 2.7 billion years old. These included ophiolite and remnants of a rift system.

Collision and amalgamation started to occur in Paleoproterozoic time (2.5–1.6 billion years ago). From 2.5 to 2.3 billion years ago, the Eastern and Western Blocks collided and amalgamated, forming the North China Craton with the Central Orogenic Belt in between. The boundary of the Central Orogenic Belt is defined by Archean geology which is 1,600 km (990 mi) from west Liaoning to west Henan. Kusky proposed that the tectonic setting of the amalgamation is an island arc, in which a westward dipping subduction zone was formed. The two blocks then combined through a westward subduction of the Eastern Block. The timing of the collision event is determined based on the age of crystallisation of the igneous rocks in the region and the age of metamorphism in the Central Orogenic Belt. Kusky also believed that the collision happened right after the rifting event, as seen from examples from orogens in other parts of the world, deformation events tend to happen closely with each other in terms of timing. After the amalgamation of the North China Craton, Inner Mongolia–Northern Hebei Orogen in the Western Block was formed by the collision of an arc terrane and the northern margin of the craton 2.3 billion years ago. The arc terrane was formed in an ocean developed during post-collisional extension in the amalgamation event 2.5 billion years ago.

Apart from the deformation event in a local scale, the craton also interacted and deformed in a regional scale. It interacted with the Columbia Supercontinent after its formation. The northern margin of the whole craton collided with another continent during the formation of Columbia Supercontinent from 1.92 to 1.85 billion years ago. Lastly, the tectonic setting of the craton became extensional, and therefore began to break out of the Columbia Supercontinent 1.8 billion years ago.

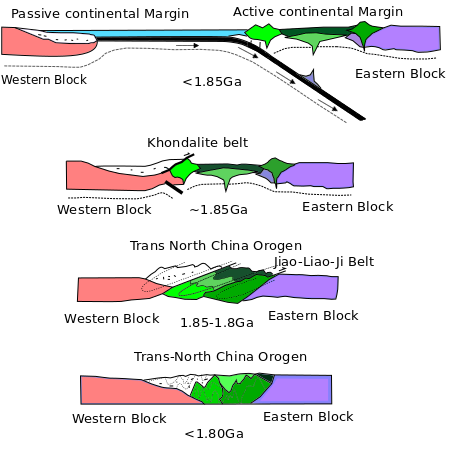
A cross-sectional diagram of the 1.8 Ga amalgamation model (the second model). The amalgamation of the two blocks was caused by subduction. The subducted oceanic plate caused the hydration of the lithosphere, therefore producing magma plumes (denoted in green). They later contributed to the formation of the Trans North China Orogen. The 2 blocks further collided and amalgamated, forming the Khondalite belt, the Jiao-Liao-Ji Belt and the Trans North China Orogen. After the craton was formed, the Trans North China Orogen experienced exhumation, isostatic rebound, and erosion, changing the orientation of rocks in the orogen. Modified from Zhao, 2000

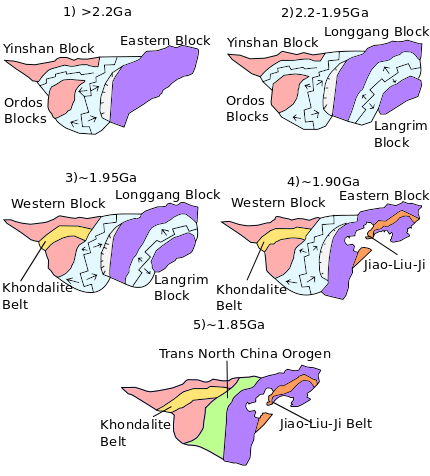
A map view diagram showing the evolution of the North China Craton in the 1.85 Ga amalgamation model. 1) The craton began as 3 separate blocks, the Yinshan Block, the Ordos Block and the Eastern Block with oceans between them (2.2 billion years ago). 2) A rift system developed in the Eastern Block that further separated it into 2 blocks, the Longgang Block and the Langrim Block (2.2–1.95 billion years ago). 3) The Yinshan Block and the Ordos Block amalgamated 1.95 billion years ago, forming the Khondalite Belt in between. 4) The rift system between the Longgang Block and the Langrim Block stopped finally, causing the blocks to amalgamate into the Eastern Block again, forming the Jiao-Liao-Ji Belt 1.9 billion years ago. 5) the Eastern and Western Blocks finally amalgamated 1.85 billion years ago, forming the Trans-North China Orogen in between. Modified from Zhao, 2012.

==== Zhao's Model: the 1.85 Ga craton amalgamation model ====
Zhao proposed another model suggesting the amalgamation of the Eastern and Western Blocks occurred 1.85 billion years ago instead. The Archean time (3.8–2.7 billion years ago) was a time of major crustal growth.

Continents started to grow in volume globally during this period, and so did the North China Craton. Pre-Neoarchean (4.6–2.8 billion years ago) rocks are just a small portion of the basement rocks, but zircon as old as 4.1 billion years old was found in the craton. He suggested that the Neoarchean (2.8–2.5 billion years ago) crust of the North China Craton, which accounts for 85% of the Permian basement, was formed in two distinct periods. First is from 2.8 to 2.7 billion years ago, and later from 2.6 to 2.5 billion years ago, based on zircon age data. Zhao suggested a pluton model to explain the formation of metamorphic rocks 2.5 billion years ago. Neoarchean (2.8–2.5 Ma) mantle upwelled and heated up the upper mantle and lower crust, resulting in metamorphism.

In the Paleoproterozoic time (2.5–1.6 billion years ago), the North China Craton amalgamated in three steps, with the final amalgamation took place 1.85 billion years ago. Based on the metamorphic ages in the Trans North China Orogen, the assembly and the formation process of the North China Craton is determined. Zhao proposed that the North China Craton was formed from 4 blocks, the Yinshan Block, the Ordos Block, the Longgang Block and the Langrim Block. The Yinshan and Ordos Blocks collided and formed the Western Block, creating the Khondalite Belt 1.95 billion years ago. For the Eastern Block, there was a rifting event in the Jiao-Liao-Ji Belt, which separated the Longgang Block and the Langrim Block with an ocean before the block was formed 2.1 to 1.9 billion years ago. A rifting system is proposed because of how the rocks were metamorphosed in the belt and symmetrical rocks have been found on both side of the Belt. Around 1.9 billion years ago, the rift system at the Jiao-Liao-Ji Belt switched to a subductional and collisional system. The Longgang Block and the Langrim Block then combined, forming the Eastern Block. 1.85 billion years ago, the Trans North China Orogen was formed by the collision of the Eastern and Western Blocks in an eastward subduction system, with probably an ocean between the 2 blocks subducted.

Zhao also proposed model about the interaction of the North China Craton with the Columbia Supercontinent. He suggested that the craton's formation event 1.85 billion years ago was part of the formation process of the Columbia Supercontinent. The craton also recorded outward accretion event of the Columbia Supercontinent after it was formed. The Xiong'er Volcanic Belt located in the Southern Margin of the craton recorded the accretion event of the Supercontinent in terms of a subduction zone. The North China Craton broke away from the Supercontinent 1.6 to 1.2 billion years ago via a rift system called Zhaertai Bayan Obo rift zone where mafic sills found is an evident of such event.

Table summarising the time when tectonic events occurred in both models
| Time^{[a]} | The 2.5 Ga Amalgamation Model (Kusky) | The 1.8 Ga Amalgamation Model (Zhao) |
|---|---|---|
| 3.8–2.7 Ga | Ancient micro blocks amalgamated to form the Western and Eastern Block | Crust grew and formed, with plutons upwell in the region, causing extensive metamorphism |
| 2.7–2.5 Ga | Eastern Block deformation (rifting in the western edge) | Crust grew and formed, with plutons upwell in the region, causing extensive metamorphism |
| 2.5–2.3 Ga | The Western and Eastern Block collided, and formed the N-S trending Central Orogenic Belt between where the 2 blocks are amalgamated | |
| 2.3 Ga | Arc Terrane collision to form Inner Mongolia- Northern Hebei Orogen in the North of the Craton | |
| 2.2–1.9 Ga | | Rifting and collision of the Eastern Block along the Jiao-Liao-Ji Belt |
| 1.95 Ga | Northern margin collided with continents in the Columbia Supercontinent | Yinshan and Ordos Block collided and formed the Western Block and the Khondalite Belt |
| 1.85 Ga | Northern margin collided with continents in the Columbia Supercontinent | Collision of the Eastern and Western Blocks leading to their amalgamation and the formation of Trans North China Orogen |
| 1.8 Ga | The tectonic setting of the craton became extensional where the craton broke out from Columbia Supercontinent | |

==== Kusky and Zhao's arguments against the other models ====
Kusky and Zhao proposed arguments against each other's model. Kusky argued that the 1.8 billion years ago metamorphic events found by Zhao to prove the amalgamation event is just the overprint of the collision event with the Columbia Supercontinent 1.85 billion years ago. The collision event with the Columbia Supercontinent also replaced lithosphere with new mantle, which would affect the dating. Another argument is that the metamorphic rocks found 1.8 billion years ago is not confined to the Central Orogenic Belt (or Trans-North China Orogenic Belt). They are also found in the Western Block, indicating that the metamorphic events was a craton-wide event. Zhao, on the opposite, argued that based on the lithological evidences, for example, the Eastern and Western Blocks must have been formed in settings different from the central part 2.6 to 2.5 billion years ago. Therefore, they would have been separated at that time. The pluton upwelling may explain the metamorphic event 2.5 billion years ago. Zhao also argued that Kusky has not provided sufficient isotopic evidence regarding the metamorphic data. In contrast with Kusky's argument that deformation events should follow tight with each other rather than staying still for 700 million years, Zhao argued that there are a lot of orogens in the world that have stayed still for a long period of time without any deformation events.

==== Other Models (Zhai's 7 Blocks Model, Faure and Trap 3 Blocks Model, Santosh Double Subduction Model) ====
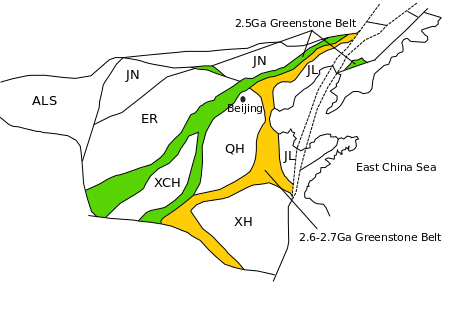
This map view diagram shows how Zhao proposed the micro blocks would have been oriented and amalgamated into North China Craton. He derived the map based on the age of the greenstone belts found in the Craton. He suggested that the greenstone belt was formed by collision of some micro blocks. The green belt on the map shows a younger greenstone belt, formed 2.5 billion years ago, while the yellow one showed the greenstone belt formed 2.6–2.7 billion years ago. (QH: Qianhuai Block, Jiaoliao Block:JL, Jining Block:JL, Xuchang Block: XCH, Xuhuai Block: XH, Alashan Block: ALS) Modified from Zhai, 2011

Apart from the models which Kusky and Zhao proposed, there are some other models available to explain the tectonic evolution of the North China Craton. One of the models is proposed by Zhai. He agreed with Kusky on the time frame of deformational events occurred in the North China Craton. He also proposed that the continent grew from around 2.9 to 2.7 billion years ago, amalgamating 2.5 billion years ago and deforming around 2.0 to 1.8 billion years ago due to its interactions with the Columbia Supercontinent. The mechanism behind these tectonic events is rift and subduction system, which is similar to the two models proposed by Kusky and Zhao. There is a major difference of Zhai's theory with the above-mentioned models: he proposed that the North China Craton, instead of simply amalgamated and formed from the Eastern and Western Blocks, was amalgamated from a total of 7 ancient blocks. Zhai found that the high-grade metamorphic rocks, a good indicator of amalgamation events, has been observed all over the craton, not just restricted to the Trans-North China Orogen or the Central Orogenic Belt. He then proposed that there must have been more blocks that participated in the amalgamation process in order to explain the presence of belts of high-grade metamorphic rocks, which must have been formed in a strong deformation event that created a high pressure and high temperature environment.

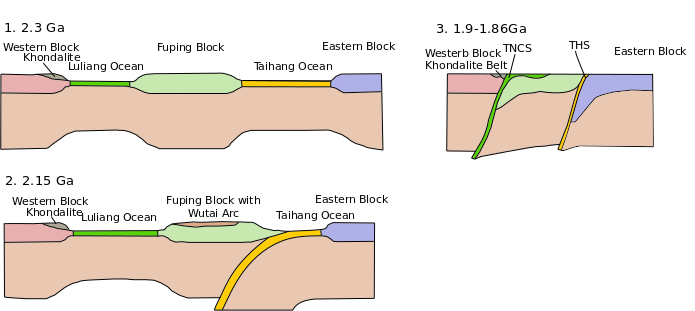
This cross-section diagram shows how the North China Craton amalgamated in the Faure and Trap Model. They proposed that the Trans-North China Orogen that is mentioned in Zhao and Kusky's model is actually a separated block. There are 2 collision and amalgamation events as proposed by Faure and Trap. At 2.1 billion years ago, the Taiahng Ocean closed with the Eastern Block and Fuping Block amalgamated through Taihang Suture (THS). At 1.9–1.8 billion years ago, the Lüliang Ocean closed and the Eastern and Western Blocks finally amalgamated forming the Trans-North China Suture (TNCS). Modified from Trap and Faure, 2011.

Faure and Trap proposed another model based on the dating and structural evidences they found. They used Ar-Ar and U-Pb dating methods and structural evidences including cleavages, lineation and dip and strike data to analyse the Precambrian history of the craton The timing of final amalgamation in their model is in-line with the timing proposed by Zhao, also around 1.8 to 1.9 billion years ago, but another time of significant deformation (2.1 billion years ago) have also been suggested. The division of micro-blocks deviated from Zhao's model. Faure and Trap identified 3 ancient continental blocks, the Eastern and Western Blocks, same as Zhao's model, as well as the Fuping Block, differing from the Trans-North China Orogen in Zhao's model. The 3 blocks were separated by two oceans, which were the Taihang Ocean and the Lüliang Ocean. They have also proposed the sequence and timing of the events occurred. Around 2.1 billion years ago, the Taihang Ocean closed with the Eastern Block and Fuping Block amalgamated through the Taihang Suture. From 1.9 to 1.8 billion years ago, the Lüliang Ocean closed, promoting the amalgamation of the Eastern and Western Blocks.

Santosh proposed a model to explain the rapid pace of amalgamation of the continental blocks, thus providing a better picture of the mechanisms of cratonization of the North China Craton. For the time frame of the deformational events, he generally agreed with Zhao's model based on metamorphic data. He provided a new insight to explain the subduction direction of the plates during amalgamation, where the 2.5 Ga craton amalgamation model suggested westward subduction, and the 1.85 Ga craton amalgamation model suggested eastern subduction. He did an extensive seismic mapping over the craton, making use of P-waves and S-waves. He discovered traces of a subducted plate in the mantle, which indicated the possible direction of subduction of the ancient plate. He finds that the Yinshan block (part of the Western Block) and the Yanliao block (part of the Eastern Block) subducted towards the centre around the Ordos Block (part of the Western Block)., in which the Yinshan block subducted eastward towards the Yanliao block. The Yinshan block further subducted to the south to the Ordos block. The Ordos Block was therefore experiencing double subduction, facilitating the amalgamation of different blocks of the craton and its interactions with the Columbia Supercontinent.

Comparison of key issues of the formation of the North China Craton in different models
| | Zhao's Model (1.85 Ga Amalgamation model) | Kusky's Model (2.5 Ga Amalgamation Model) | Zhai's Model (7 Blocks Model) | Faure's Model (3 Blocks Model) | Santosh's Model (Double subduction model) |
|---|---|---|---|---|---|
| Timing of amalgamation | 1.85 Ga | 2.5–2.3 Ga | 2.5–2.3 Ga | Final amalgamation at 1.8–1.9 Ga, but an additional amalgamation event of the Fuping Block with the Eastern Block | 1.85 Ga |
| Constituent Microblocks of the North China Craton | The Eastern and Western Blocks, separated by Trans-North China Orogen | The Eastern and Western Blocks, separated by Central Orogenic Belt | 7 microblocks (Qianhuai Block, Jiaoliao Block, Jining Block, Xuchang Block, Xuhuai Block, Alashan Block) separated by belts of metamorphic rocks | The Eastern and Western Blocks with Fuping Block in between | The Eastern and Western Blocks, separated by Trans-North China Orogen |
| Direction of subduction | Eastward subduction | Westward subduction | (Not mentioned) | Westward subction | Double subduction, both westward and eastward subduction |

=== Phanerozoic history (539 million years ago to present time) ===
The North China Craton remained stable for a long time after the amalgamation of craton. There were thick sediments deposited from Neoproterozoic (1000 to 539 million years ago). The flat-lying Palaeozoic sedimentary rocks recorded extinction and evolution. The center of the craton remained stable until mid-Ordovician (467–458 million years ago), due to the discovery of xenoliths in the older lithosphere in kimberlite dykes. Since then, the North China Craton entered period of craton destruction, meaning that the craton was no longer stable. Most scientists defined destruction of a craton as thinning of lithosphere, thus losing rigidity and stability. A large-scale lithosphere thinning event took place especially in the Eastern Block of the craton, resulting in large-scale deformations and earthquakes in the region. Gravity gradient showed that the Eastern Block remains thin up till present day. The mechanism and timing of craton destruction is still under debate. Scientists proposed four important deformation events that could possibly lead to or contributed to craton destruction, namely subduction and closure of Paleo-Asian Ocean in Carboniferous to Jurassic (324–236 million years ago), late Triassic collision of the Yangtze Craton and North China Craton (240–210 million years ago), Jurassic subduction of the Paleo-Pacific Plate (200–100 million years ago) and Cretaceous collapse of orogens (130–120 million years ago). As for the destabilisation mechanism, 4 models could be generalised. They are the subduction model, the extension model the magma underplating mode, and the lithospheric folding model.

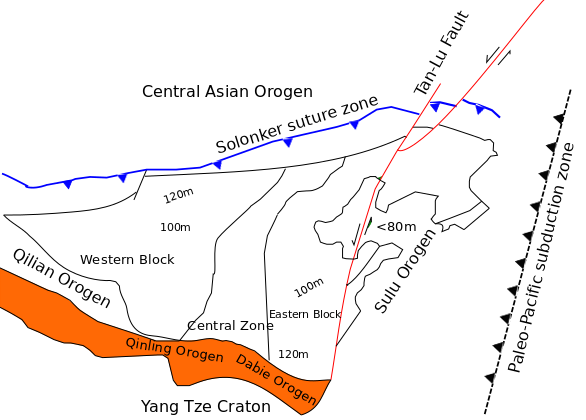
This is a map showing the different tectonic elements near the North China Craton in the Phanerozoic. The elements includes the Solonker suture zone in the north, the Paleo-Pacific subduction zone in the east, and the Qinling Dabie Orogen in the south. Modified from Zhu, 2015

==== Timeline of craton destruction ====
There were several major tectonic events occurring in the Phanerozoic, especially in the margins of the Eastern Block. Some of them were hypothesized to have caused the destruction of the craton.

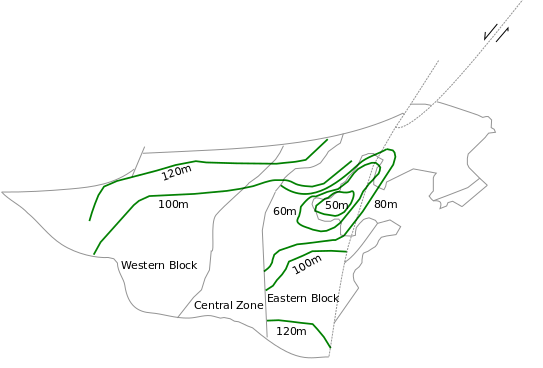
The green lines on this lithospheric thickness map are lithospheric depth contour lines, meaning that the lithosphere is of the depth specified in that position. A zone in the Eastern Block has especially thinned lithosphere. Modified from Windley, 2010,

1. Carboniferous to Middle Jurassic (324–236 million years ago) --- Subduction and closure of Paleo-Asian Ocean.
  - Subduction zones were located in the northern margin where continents grew through accretion. Solonker suture was resulted and Palaeoasian ocean was therefore closed.
  - There were 2 phases of magma up-welling, one occurred 324–270 million years ago, while another occurred 262–236 million years ago. Rocks such as syncollisional granites, metamorphic core complexes, granitoids were produced with magma from partial melts of the Precambrian rocks.
  - Since marine sediments were found in most part of the craton, except for the northern part, it can be concluded that the craton was still relatively stable after this deformation event.
2. Late Triassic (240–210 million years ago) --- Assembly of the North China Craton and the Yang Tze Craton.
  - Suture between the North China Craton and the Yang Tze Craton was caused by deep subduction and collision setting, creating Qinling-Dabie Orogen. This is supported by mineral evidence, such as diamonds, eclogites and felsic gneisses.
  - Magmatism was prevalent in the eastern side, and the magma formed in this period were relatively young. Magmatism was largely caused by the collision between two cratons.
  - Terrane accretion, continent-continent collision and extrusion in the area caused various stages of metamorphism.
  - Evidences from various isotopic dating (e.g. zircon U-Pb dating), and composition analysis showed that the lithosphere of the Yang Tze Craton was below the North China Craton in some part of the Eastern Block, and that the magma sample was young relative to the period they were formed. This shows that the old, lower lithosphere was extensively replaced, hence thinned. This period is therefore proposed to be the time when the craton destruction occurred.
3. Jurassic (200–100 million years ago) --- Subduction of the Paleo-Pacific Plate
  - The Pacific Plate was subducted westward as the ocean basin to the north of the craton was closed. This was probably an active continental margin setting.
  - The Tan-Lu fault is located in eastern side of the craton. The time of its formation is debatable. Some argued that was formed in Triassic while some suggested Cretaceous. The fault was about 1,000 km (620 mi) in length, stretching into Russia. It was probably caused by either collision with the South China Craton or oblique convergence with the Pacific and Asia plates.
  - Scientists studied the chemical composition of the rocks to determine their origin and process of formation, and also studied the mantle structure. The studies show that the lower lithosphere in this period was newly injected. The new material followed the north-northeast trend, which was concluded that subduction of the Pacific Plate caused the removal of old lithosphere and hence thinned the craton.
4. Cretaceous (130–120 million years ago) --- Collapse of Orogen
  - This is a period where the mode of tectonic switched from contraction to extension. This resulted in the collapse of the orogen formed in Jurassic to Cretaceous. The orogenic belt and plateau (Hubei collisional plateau and Yanshan belt) started to collapse and formed metamorphic core complexes with normal faults.
  - Under the influence of extensional stress field, basins, for example, Bohai Bay Basin, were formed.
  - Magmatism was prevalent, and the isotopic studies showed that the mantle composition changed from enriched to depleted, which proved that new materials were replacing the mantle root. Evidence is from hafnium (Hf) isotope analysis, xenolith zircon studies, and analysis of the metamorphic rocks.

Timeline summarizing tectonic events that caused the destruction of craton root
| | Geological Event | Geological Structure Resulted |
|---|---|---|
| Carboniferous to Middle Jurassic (324–236 million years ago) | Subduction and closure of Paleo-Asian Ocean, with phases of magmatism observed. | Solonker Suture (North of the Craton) |
| Late Triassic (240–210 million years ago) | Suture between the North China Craton and the Yang Tze Craton by deep subduction and continental collision. Isotopic data showed that at least part of the craton root was destroyed. | Qinling-Dabie Orogen (South to Southwest of the Craton) |
| Jurassic (200–100 million years ago) | The Pacific Plate was subducted westward in an active continental margin setting. This result in new magmatic material (as shown by isotopic age) being aligned with the subduction zone, proving craton destruction. | Tan-Lu Fault (East of the Craton) |
| Cretaceous (130–120 million years ago) | Mode of tectonic switched to extension. The orogenic belt and plateau (Hubei collisional plateau and Yanshan belt) started to collapse, which also result in the replacement of magmatic material in the mantle root. | Bohai Bay Basin |

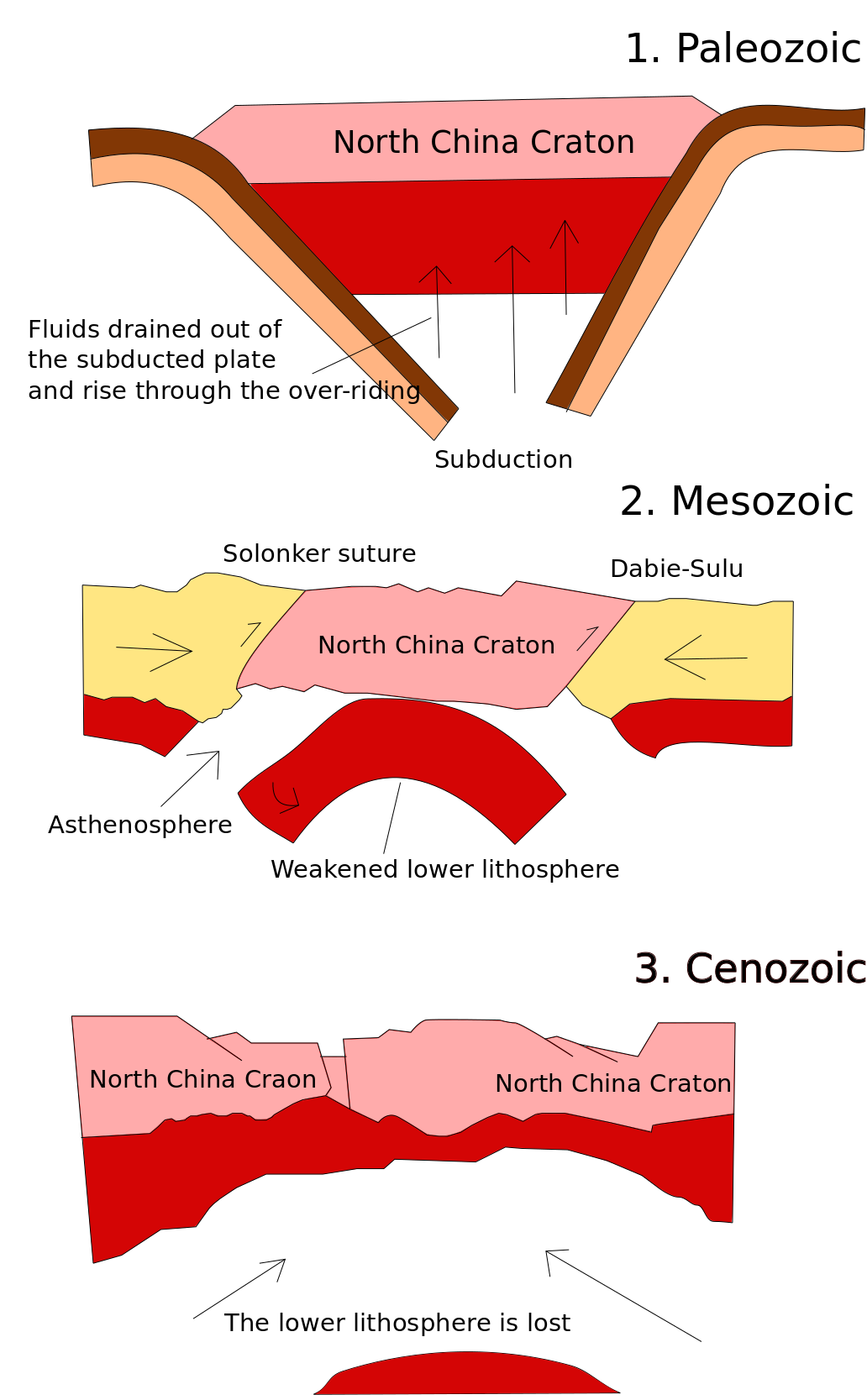
This is a diagram showing an example of the subduction model by Kusky, 2007. 1) plates are subducted under the North China Craton near the margin in the Paleozoic with most part of the craton remained relatively stable. The subduction generated fluids which weakened the lower crust. At the same time, subduction increased the density of the lower lithosphere. 2) & 3) In the Mesozoic, the North China Craton begins to experience deformation. The collisions in the north and south triggered the weakened lower lithosphere to detach. Modified from Kusky, 2007

==== Causes of craton destruction ====
The causes of the craton destruction event and the thinning of the Eastern Block lithosphere are complicated. Four models can be generalized from the different mechanisms proposed by scientists.

1. Subduction Model
  - This model explained subduction as the main cause of the craton destruction. It is a very popular model.
  - Subduction of oceanic plate also causes subduction of water inside the lithosphere. As the fluid encounters high temperature and pressure when being subducted, the fluid is released, weakening the crust and mantle due to the lowered melting point of rocks.
  - Subduction also causes the thickening of crust on the over-riding plate. Once the over-thickened crust collapses, the lithosphere would be thinned.
  - Subduction causes the formation of eclogite because rocks are under high temperature and pressure, for example, the subducted plate becomes deeply buried. It would therefore cause slab break-off and slab rollback, thinning the lithosphere.
  - Subduction was widely occurring in the Phanerozoic, including subduction and closure of Paleo-Asian Ocean in Carboniferous to Middle Jurassic, subduction of the Yang Tze Craton under the North China Craton in Late Triassic, and subduction of Paleo-Pacific Plate in the Jurassic and the Cretaceous as mentioned in the previous part. The subduction model can therefore be used to explain the proposed craton destruction event in different periods.
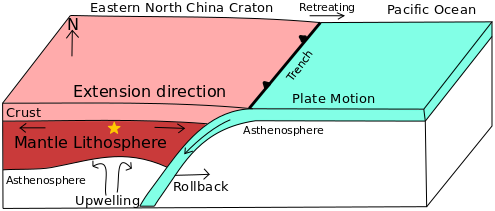
    This is a diagram showing how lithosphere can be thinned by retreating subduction. The yellow star shows where the thinned lithosphere is. The lithosphere thinned because the subducting plate roll back faster than the over-riding plate could migrate forward. As a result, the over-riding plate stretch its lithosphere to catch up with the roll back, which resulted in lithospheric thinning. Modified from Zhu, 2011.
2. Extension Model
  - There are 2 types of lithospheric extension, retreating subduction and collapse of orogens. Both of them have been used to explain lithospheric thinning occurred in the North China Craton.
  - Retreating subduction system means that the subducting plate moves backward faster than the over-riding plate moves forward. The over-riding plate spreads to fill the gap. With the same volume of lithosphere but being spread to a larger area, the over-riding plate is thinned. This could be applied to different subduction events in Phanerozoic. For example, Zhu proposes that the subduction of Paleo-Pacific Ocean was a retreating subduction system, that caused the lithospheric thinning in the Cretaceous.
  - Collapse of orogen introduces a series of normal faults (e.g. bookshelf faulting) and thinned the lithosphere. Collapse of orogens is very common in the Cretaceous.
3. Magma Underplating Model
  - This models suggests that the young hot magma is very close to the crust. The heat then melts and thins the lithosphere, causing upwelling of young asthenosphere.
  - Magmatism was prevalent throughout the Phanerozoic due to the extensive deformation events. l This model can therefore be used to explain lithospheric thinning in different periods of time.
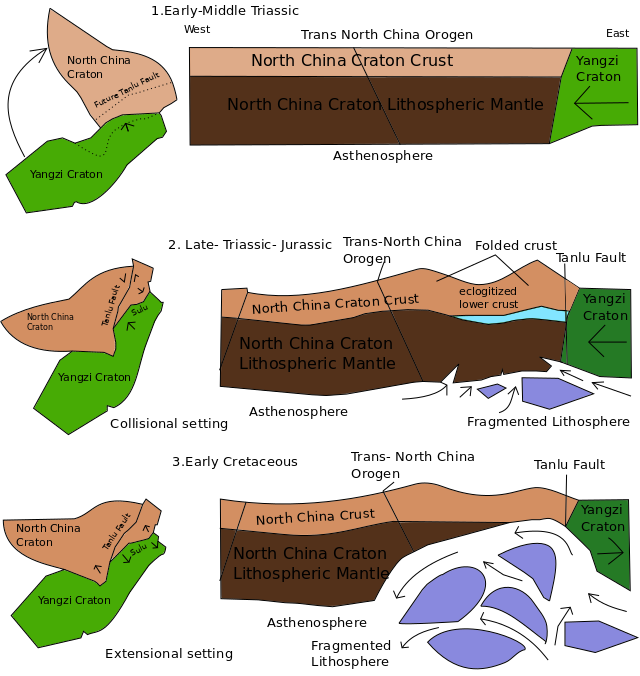
    This is a diagram showing how the lithosphere can be thinned through folding in map and cross section. Folding occurs when the Yang Tze Craton and the North China Craton collided. Week points and dense eclogites were developed in the lower crust. They are later fragmented and sank because of convection of asthenosphere. Edited from Zhang, 2011.
4. Asthosphere Folding Model
  - This model is specifically proposed for how the Yang Tze Craton and the North China Craton collided and thinned the lithosphere.
  - The collision of the 2 cratons first thickened the crust by folding. Eclogite formed in the lower crust, which made the lower crust denser. New shear zones also developed in the lower crust.
  - The asthenosphere convected and seeped into weak points developed in the lower crust shear zones. The heavy lower crust was then fragmented and sunk into the lithosphere. The lithosphere of the North China Craton was then thinned.

== Biostratigraphy ==
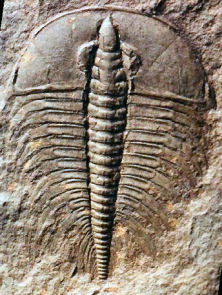
Trilobite fossil that can be possibly used for biostratigraphy and to understand evolution and extinction

The North China Craton is very important in terms of understanding biostratigraphy and evolution. In Cambrian and Ordovician time, the units of limestone and carbonate kept a good record of biostratigraphy and therefore they are important for studying evolution and mass extinction. The North China platform was formed in early Palaeozoic. It had been relatively stable during Cambrian and the limestone units are therefore deposited with relatively few interruptions. The limestone units were deposited in underwater environment in Cambrian. It was bounded by faults and belts for example Tanlu fault. The Cambrian and Ordovician carbonate sedimentary units can be defined by six formations: Liguan, Zhushadong, Mantou, Zhangxia, Gushan, Chaomidian. Different trilobite samples can be retrieved in different strata, forming biozones. For example, lackwelderia tenuilimbata (a type of trilobite) zone in Gushan formation. The trilobite biozones can be useful to correlate and identify events in different places, like identifying unconformity sequences from a missing biozones or correlates events happening in a neighbouring block (like Tarim block).

The carbonate sequence can also be of evolutionary significance because it indicates extinction events like the biomeres in the Cambrian. Biomeres are small extinction events defined by the migration of a group of trilobite, family Olenidae, which had lived in deep sea environment. Olenidae trilobites migrated to shallow sea regions while the other trilobite groups and families died out in certain time periods. This is speculated to be due to a change in ocean conditions, either a drop in ocean temperature, or a drop in oxygen concentration. They affected the circulation and living environment for marine species. The shallow marine environment would change dramatically, resembling a deep sea environment. The deep sea species would thrive, while the other species died out. The trilobite fossils actually records important natural selection processes. The carbonate sequence containing the trilobite fossils hence important to record paleoenvironment and evolution.

== Mineral resources in the North China Craton ==
The North China Craton contains abundant mineral resources which are very important economically. With the complex tectonic activities in The North China Craton, the ore deposits are also very rich. Deposition of ore is affected by atmospheric and hydrosphere interaction and the evolution from primitive tectonics to modern plate tectonics. Ore formation is related to supercontinent fragmentation and assembly. For example, copper and lead deposited in sedimentary rocks indicated rifting and therefore fragmentation of a continent; copper, volcanogenic massive sulfide ore deposits (VMS ore deposits) and orogenic gold deposits indicated subduction and convergent tectonics, meaning amalgamation of continents. Therefore, the formation of a certain type of ore is restricted to a specific period and the minerals are formed in relation with tectonic events. Below the ore deposits are explained based on the period they were formed.

=== Mineral deposits ===
==== Late Neoarchean (2.8–2.5 billion years ago) ====
All deposits in this period are found in greenstone belts, which is a belt full of metamorphic rocks. This is consistent with the active tectonic activity in the Neoarchean.

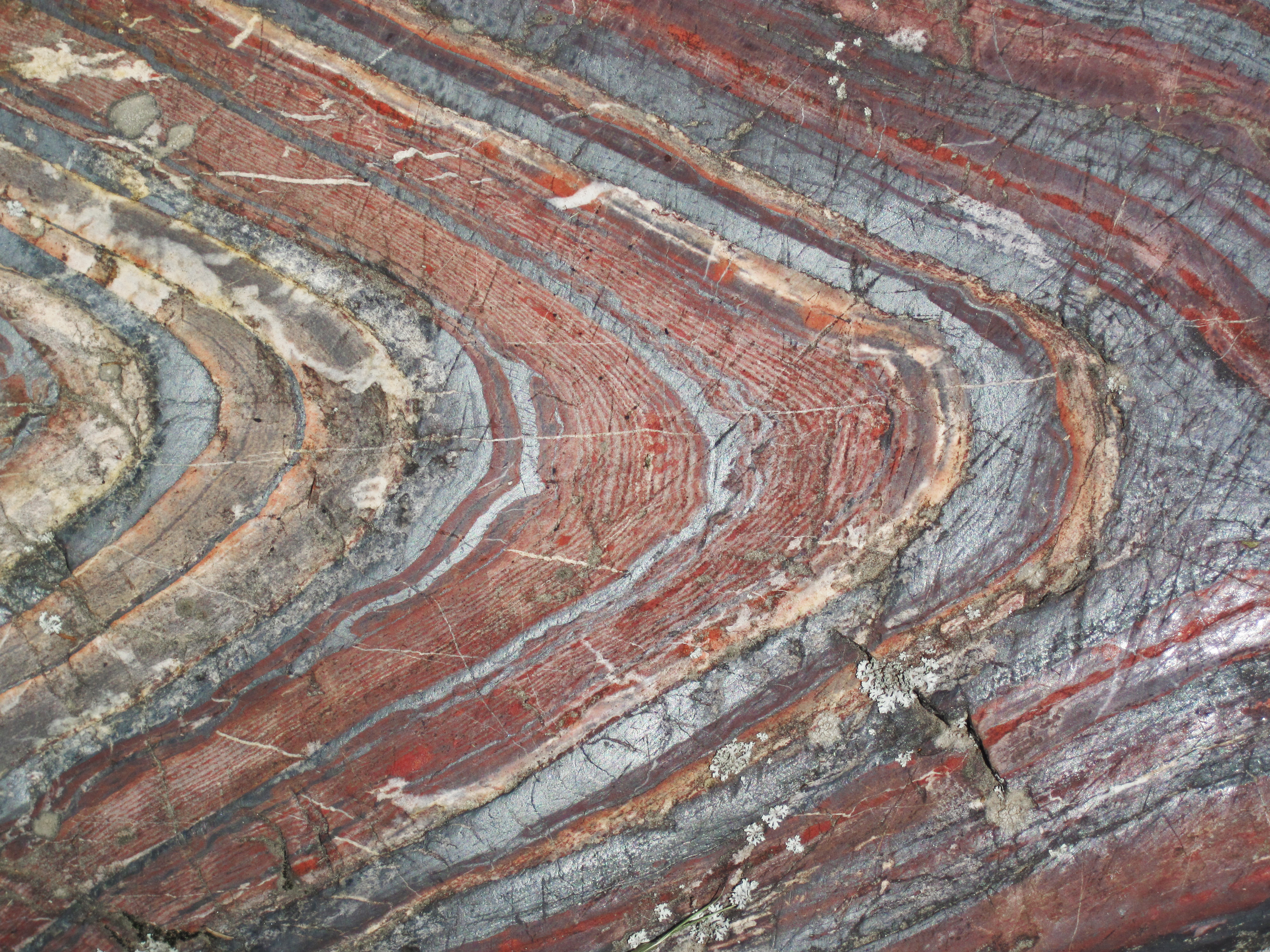
Banded iron formation example from another part of the world

Banded iron formations (BIFs) belong to granulite facies and are widely distributed in the metamorphosed units. The age of the ore is defined by isotopic analysis of hafnium dating. They are interlayered with volcanic-sedimentary rocks. They can also occur as some other features: dismembered layers, lenses and boudins. All the iron occurrences are in oxide form, rarely in silicate or carbonate form. By analysing their oxygen isotope composition, it is suggested that the iron was deposited in an environment of weakly oxidized shallow sea environment. There are four regions where extensive iron deposits are found: Anshan in northeast China, eastern Hebei, Wutai and Xuchang-Huoqiu. The North China Craton banded iron formation contains the most important source of iron in China. It consists of more than 60–80% of the nations iron reserves.

Copper- zinc (Cu-Zn) deposits were deposited in the Hongtoushan greenstone belt, which was located in the northeastern part of the North China Craton. They are typical volcanogenic massive sulfide ore deposits and were formed under rift environment. The formation of the Cu-Zn deposits might not be under modern tectonics, so the formation process might be different from modern rift system.

Neoarchean greenstone belt gold deposits are located in Sandaogou (northeastern side of The North China Craton). The greenstone belt type gold deposits are not commonly found in the craton because most of them were reworked in the Mesozoic, so they appeared to be in some other form. However, from other cratonic examples in the world, the greenstone belt gold deposits should be abundant in the first place.

==== Paleoproterozoic (2.5–2.6 billion years ago) ====
Ultra high temperature metamorphic rocks found in the Paleoproterozoic Period indicate the start of modern tectonics. Great oxygenation events (GOE) also occurred in this period and it marked the start of a shift from an oxygen poor to an oxygen rich environments. There are two types of minerals commonly found from this period. They are copper-lead zinc deposits and magnesite – boron deposits.

Copper-lead-zinc (Cu-Pb-Zn) deposits were deposited in collisional setting mobile belts, which were in a rift and subduction system. Copper deposits are found in the Zhongtiaoshan area of Shanxi province. The khondalite sequence, which are high temperature metamorphic rocks, and graphite are often found together with the ore deposits. There are a few types of ore deposits found and each of them correspond to a different formation environment. Cu-Pb-Zn formed in metamorphosed VMS deposits, Cu-Mo deposits formed in accreted arc complexes, while copper-cobalt Cu-Co deposits formed in an intrusive environment.

Magnesite – boron deposits were formed in sedimentary sequences under rift related shallow sea lagoon settings. It was a response to the great oxidation event as seen from its isotopic content. In the Jiaoliao mobile belt, the GOE changed the isotopic ratio of ^{13}C and ^{18}O as the rock underwent recrystallization and mass exchange. The ore also allows people to further understand the Global Oxidation Event system, for example, showing the exact atmospheric chemical change during that period.

==== Mesoproterozoic (1.6–1.0 billion years ago) ====
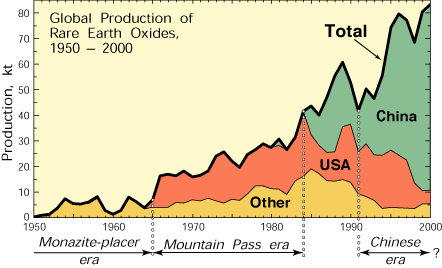
Production of REE around the world

A rare-earth element-iron-lead-zinc (REE-Fe-Pb-Zn) system was formed from extensional rifting with upwelling of mantle, and therefore magma fractionation. There were multiple rifting events resulting in the deposition of iron minerals and the occurrence rare earth element was closely related to the iron and carbonatite dykes. The REE-Fe-Pb-Zn system occurs in an alternating volcanic and sedimentary succession. Apart from REE, LREE (light rare earth elements) are also found in carbonatite dykes. Rare earth elements have important industrial and political implications in China. China is close to monopolising the export of rare earth elements in the whole world. Even the United States relies heavily on rare earth elements imported from China, while rare earth elements are essential in technologies. Rare earth elements can make high quality permanent magnets, and are therefore irreplaceable in the production of electrical appliances and technologies, including televisions, phones, wind turbines and lasers.

==== Palaeozoic (539–350 million years ago) ====
A copper-molybdenum (Cu-Mo) system originated in both the Central Asian Orogenic Belt (North) and the Qinling Orogenic Belt (South).

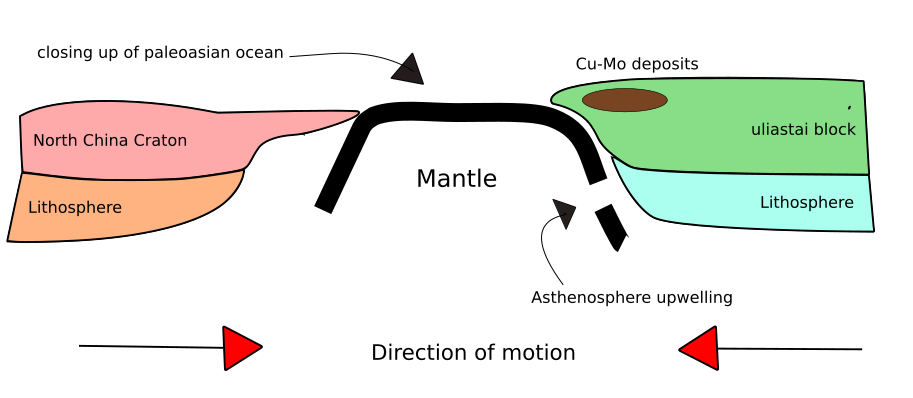
Described the tectonic processes of The North China Craton northern margin in the Palaeozoic. The subduction and collision event caused minerals to deposited on the edge of the continental crust. The place where the Cu-Mo was deposited is indicated. Edited from Zhai and Santos,2013 and Kusty et al., 2007

The Central Asian Orgenic belt ore deposits occurred in arc complexes. They formed from the closure of Paleo-Asian ocean. The subduction generated copper and molybdenum Cu-Mo mineralization in the lithosphere block margins. Duobaoshan Cu and Bainaimiao Cu-Mo deposits are found in granodiorite. Tonghugou deposits occur with the copper ore chalcopyrite. North China hosted a large reserve of molybdenum with more than 70 ore bodies found in the Northern margin of the craton.

Mineral deposits in southern margin of the North China Craton are next to the Qinling orogenic belt. Some deposits were formed during the amalgamation of the North and South China blocks. A rifting-subduction-collision processes in Danfeng suture zone generated VMS deposits (Cu-Pb-Zn) in the arc area and a marginal fault basin.

During the opening of Paleo-Qinling oceans in this period, nickel-copper deposits formed with peridotite gabbro bodies and the ores can be found in Luonan.

==== Mesozoic (251–145 million years ago) ====
Gold (Au) deposits in the Mesozoic are very abundant. The formation environment of the gold includes intercontinental mineralization, craton destruction and mantle replacement. The origin of the gold is from Precambrian basement rocks of the Jiaodong Complex and underlying mantle which underwent high grade metamorphism when intruded with Mesozoic granitoids. The largest cluster of gold deposits in China is found in the Jiaodong peninsula (east of Shandong Province). The area yielded one-fourth of the country's gold production but consisted only of 0.2% of the area of China. The three sub-clusters of gold deposits in northern China are Linglong, Yantai and Kunyushan respectively.

=== Diamond production ===
China has been producing diamonds for over 40 years in the North China Craton. At first, diamonds were produced from alluvial deposits, but later on technology improved and the diamonds are now produced from kimberlitic sources. There are two main diamond mines in China, the China Diamond Corps' 701 Changma Mine in Shandong province and the Wafangdian Mine in Liaoning Province. The former operated for 34 years and produced 90,000 carats of diamonds per year. The latter produced 60,000 carats per year, but its mining activity ceased in 2002.

Diamond bearing kimberlite pipes and dykes were emplaced during the Ordovician in the Archean crust between 450–480 million years ago and again in the Tertiary. Uplifting events caused the kimberlite to be exposed. The two mines exist along narrow and discontinuous dykes around the Tan Lu fault. Porphyritic kimberlites often occur with a matrix of other materials, such as serpentinized olivine and phlogopite or biotite, and breccia fragments. The occurrence of diamonds with different materials caused a difference in diamond grade, diamond size distribution and quality. For example, the diamonds from the China Diamond Corps' 701 Changma Mine worth US$40 per carat, while the diamonds from the Wafangdian Mine worth up to US$125 per carat.

== See also ==
- Archean subduction
- Eastern Block of North China Craton
- Eoarchean geology
- Western Block of North China Craton

== Notes ==
a.Ga is the short form for billion years ago; Ma is the short form for million years ago.
