= Setting Net Lake mine =

Molybdenum mine in Ontario, Canada

Setting Net Lake prospect
- Interactive map of Setting Net Lake prospect
- Location: Ontario, Canada; 52°49′8.22″N 93°35′1.69″W
- Products: Molybdenum

The Setting Net Lake prospect is a molybdenum prospect located in northwestern Ontario in Canada. The Setting Net Lake prospect has a historic (non-NI 43-101) reserve amounting to 100 million tons of molybdenum ore at a grade of 0.09% Mo.

== See also ==
- List of molybdenum mines
