= Molybrook mine =

Molybdenum mine in Newfoundland and Labrador, Canada

- Location: Newfoundland and Labrador, Canada
- Products: Molybdenum

The Molybrook mine is one of the largest molybdenum mines in Canada. The mine is located in north-east Canada in Newfoundland and Labrador. The Molybrook mine has reserves amounting to 200 million tonnes of molybdenum ore grading 0.05% molybdenum thus resulting 100,000 tonnes of molybdenum.

== See also ==
- List of molybdenum mines
