= Zuun Mod mine =

Mine in Mongolia

Zuun Mod deposit
- Location: Bayankhongor province, Mongolia
- Products: Molybdenum Copper
- Company: Erdene Resource Development Corp
- Website: https://www.erdene.com/en/projects/zuun-mod/

The Zuun Mod deposit is one of the largest molybdenum and copper porphyry deposits in Mongolia. The deposit is located in southwestern Mongolia and its mining license is owned 100% by Erdene Resource Development Corporation. The Zuun Mod deposit has NI 43-101 compliant measured and indicated resource amounting to 218 million tonnes of ore grading 0.057% molybdenum and 0.069% copper at a 0.04% molybdenum cutoff grade. This results in 273.5 million pounds of contained molybdenum metal and 330.7 million pounds of contained copper metal.

== See also ==
- List of molybdenum mines
