= Yichun Luming mine =

Molybdenum mine in Yichun City, Heilongjiang, China

- Location in China
- Location: Yichun City, Heilongjiang, China; 47°21′01″N 128°32′43″E
- Products: Molybdenum
- Production: 22,500 tons of molybdenum concentrate; 4,950 tons of copper concentrate; 75,300 tons of sulfur concentrate
- Company: China Railway Group
- Website: http://www.ztzylmky.com.cn

The Yichun Luming mine is a Chinese molybdenum mine located 60 kilometres (37 mi) south-west of the city of Yichun in Heilongjiang province. The mine is operated by Yichun Luming Mining Company, a subsidiary of China Railway Group. It is the largest open-pit mine in China. On 28 March 2020, the mine had a significant tailings release from its storage facility of 2.53 million cubic metres of polluted water. The Chinese government has launched an investigation into the incident.

== See also ==
- List of molybdenum mines
- List of mines in China
- Tailings
