= Qingchengzi mine =

Lead and zinc mine in Liaoning, China

- Location: Liaoning, China
- Products: Lead, Zinc
- Opened: 1950s

The Qingchengzi mine is one of the largest lead and zinc mines in China. The mine is located in Liaoning, northeastern China. The mine has reserves amounting to 29.9 million tonnes of ore grading 2.64% lead and 1.9% zinc thus resulting 0.73 million tonnes of lead and 0.35 million tonnes of zinc.

== See also ==
- List of mines in China
