= Tonglushan mine =

Copper mine in Hubei, China

- Location in China
- Location: Daye, Hubei, China; 30°04′49″N 114°56′49″E
- Products: Copper; Iron
- Company: China Daye Non-Ferrous Metals Mining Ltd.

The Tonglushan mine is a Chinese copper mine located 1.5 kilometres (0.93 mi) east of the city of Daye in Hubei province. The mine is operated by China Daye Non-Ferrous Metals Mining Ltd., a subsidiary of China Nonferrous Metal Mining Group. On 12 March 2017, the open-pit mine was the site of a tailings dam failure which killed at least 2 workers. The operating company, China Daye Non-Ferrous Metals Mining reportedly incurred a 45.2M Yuan loss due to the incident after an investigation launched by the government of Huangshi city. Mining and illegal extraction of material under the dam was blamed for its failure.

== See also ==
- List of mines in China
- Dam failure
- Tailings
