= List of molybdenum mines =

This list of molybdenum mines is subsidiary to the list of mines article and lists working, defunct and planned mines that have substantial molybdenum output, organized by country.

== Asia ==
=== Armenia ===
Province	Mine	Operator	Location
Syunik	Kajaran mine	Zangezur Copper and Molybdenum Combine	Kajaran

=== China ===
Province	Mine	Operator	Location
Henan	-	China Molybdenum Company Limited	-
Shaanxi	-	Jinduicheng Molybdenum Group Mining Corporation	-
Liaoning	Yangjiazhangzi Molybdenum Mine	Yangjiazhangzi Mining Bureau	Lianshan District, Huludao City
Heilongjiang	Yichun Luming mine	Yichun Luming Mining Company	Yichun
Hunan	Shizhuyuan mine	Dongpo ore field, Yizhang Co.	Chenzhou

== Europe ==
Country	Mine	Operator	Location
Norway	Knaben	-	-
Sweden	Munka	-	-
Sweden	Åggojaure	-	-
Sweden	Norregruvan	-	-
Sweden	Porjusgruvan	-	-
Sweden	Druggegruvan	-	-
Sweden	Haukok	-	-
Sweden	Björntjärn	-	-

== North America ==
=== Canada ===
Province	Mine	Operator	Location
British Columbia	MAX (U., C.)	FortyTwo Metals Inc. (Roca Mines Inc.)	Trout Lake
British Columbia	Kitsault	Avanti Mining Inc.	140 km northeast of Prince Rupert
British Columbia	Highland Valley (P., C.)	Teck Cominco Limited	Logan Lake
British Columbia	Gibraltar (P., C.)	Taseko Mines Limited	north of Williams Lake
British Columbia	Endako (P., C.)	Thompson Creek Mining Limited	Fraser Lake
British Columbia	Huckleberry (P., C.)	Imperial Metals Corporation	Houston

=== United States ===
State	Mine	Operator	County
Arizona	Bagdad	Freeport-McMoRan	Yavapai
Arizona	Mineral Park	Mercator Minerals Ltd.	Mohave
Arizona	Morenci	Freeport-McMoRan	Greenlee
Arizona	Sierrita	Freeport-McMoRan	Pima
Colorado	Climax	Climax Molybdenum Company (Freeport-McMoRan)	Lake
Colorado	Henderson	Climax Molybdenum Company (Freeport-McMoRan)	Clear Creek
Idaho	Thompson Creek	Thompson Creek Metals Co. Inc.	Custer
Montana	Continental Pit	Montana Resources LLP	Silver Bow
Nevada	Ashdown mine	Win-Eldrich Mines Ltd.	Humboldt
Nevada	Robinson	Quadra FNX Mining Ltd.	White Pine
New Mexico	Chino	Freeport-McMoRan	Grant
New Mexico	Questa	Chevron Mining	Taos
Utah	Bingham Canyon	Kennecott Utah Copper Corp.	Salt Lake

== South America ==
=== Chile ===
The following copper mines produce more than 1,000 million tons of molybdenum per year as of 2023 according to the Chilean Copper Commission. Regions are ordered from north to south.

Region	Mine	Operator	Location
Tarapacá	Collahuasi	Compañía Minera Doña Inés de Collahuasi	Pica
Antofagasta	Centinela	Minera Centinela	Sierra Gorda
Antofagasta	Chuquicamata	Codelco	Calama
Antofagasta	Radomiro Tomic	Codelco	Calama
Antofagasta	Sierra Gorda	Sierra Gorda SCM	Sierra Gorda
Antofagasta	Spence	Pampa Norte (BHP)	Sierra Gorda
Atacama	Caserones	SCM Minera Lumina Copper Chile	Tierra Amarilla
Coquimbo	Los Pelambres	Antofagasta Minerals	Salamanca
Valparaíso	Andina	Codelco	Los Andes
Santiago	Los Bronces	Anglo American Sur	Lo Barnechea
O'Higgins	El Teniente	Codelco	Machalí

== South West Pacific ==
=== Papua New Guinea ===
Province	Mine	Operator	Location
Madang	Yandera	Marengo Mining Limited	-

=== Australia ===
State	Mine	Principal Company	Location
Queensland	Anduramba	D'Aguilar Gold	100 km northwest of Brisbane, Qld
South Australia	Kalkaroo	Havilah Resources NL	Northwest of Broken Hill, SA
New South Wales	Kingsgate	Auzex Resources	20 km east of Glen Innes
Northern Territory	Molyhil	Thor Mining PLC	230 km northeast of Alice Springs, NT
Western Australia	Spinifex Ridge	Moly Mines Ltd.	110 km south of Wyndham
