= Zhongyuan culture =

Culture of China's "Central Plains" region

Zhongyuan culture (Chinese: 中原文化) refers to the culture of Zhongyuan (Central Plains) of China, centered in much of Henan province and parts of nearby provinces like Shandong, Shanxi, Hebei, Anhui, Jiangsu and Shaanxi. It is widely held to be one of the main cradles of Han ethnic culture, and later modern Chinese civilization.

Historically, the region has spent much of history being the political core of successive orthodox Chinese dynasties, resulting in it having significant cultural influences across the entire East Asia. It is also constantly evolving and changing throughout history.

== See also ==
- Chinese culture
