= Tonghe Subdistrict, Pingdu =

Tonghe Subdistrict 同和街道
- Subdistrict
- Location in Shandong
- Coordinates: 36.74°N 119.929°E
- Country: People's Republic of China
- Province: Shandong
- Prefecture-level city: Qingdao
- County-level city: Pingdu
- Time zone: UTC+8 (China Standard)

Tonghe Subdistrict (Chinese: 同和街道; pinyin: Tónghé Jiēdào) is a subdistrict in Pingdu, Shandong province, China. As of 2020, it administers the following five residential neighborhoods and 93 villages:

Neighborhoods

- Nancheng (南城)
- Heping (和平路)
- Gaoping Road (高平路)
- Zhongxing (中兴)
- Tongxin (同鑫)

Villages

- Zhongxinzhuang Village (中辛庄村)
- Wangjiashagezhuang Village (王家沙戈庄村)
- Nijiashagezhuang Village (倪家沙戈庄村)
- Chaijiashagezhuang Village (柴家沙戈庄村)
- Jiangjiashagezhuang Village (姜家沙戈庄村)
- Jingjiatuan Village (荆家疃村)
- Cuijiazhuang Village (崔家庄村)
- Xifengtaipu Village (西丰台堡村)
- Dongfengtaipu Village (东丰台堡村)
- Daguanjiazhuang Village (大官家庄村)
- Houjiazhan Village (候家站村)
- Wangjiazhan Village (王家站村)
- Lijiazhan Village (李家站村)
- Nanshilipu Village (南十里堡村)
- Nandaijiazhuang Village (南代家庄村)
- Lijialou Village (李家楼村)
- Liujiazhang Village (刘家张村)
- Yaojia Village (姚家村)
- Xiezi Village (斜子村)
- Nanzhaike Village (南宅科村)
- Pangjia Village (庞家村)
- Honggounanzhuang Village (洪沟南庄村)
- Dahonggou Village (大洪沟村)
- Yangjiajinggezhuang Village (杨家荆戈庄村)
- Zhangjiajinggezhuang Village (张家荆戈庄村)
- Yaojiajinggezhuang Village (姚家荆戈庄村)
- Cuijiajinggezhuang Village (崔家荆戈庄村)
- Sunjiazhang Village (孙家张村)
- Zhengjiazhang Village (郑家张村)
- Liangjiazhuang Village (梁家庄村)
- Dongsunjiazhuang Village (东孙家庄村)
- Nanzhuang Village (南庄村)
- Juntun Village (军屯村)
- Songjiazhaogezhuang Village (宋家赵戈庄村)
- Shijiazhuang Village (石家庄村)
- Huangjiatuan Village (黄家疃村)
- Dazhaogezhuang Village (大赵戈庄村)
- Wangjiazhaogezhuang Village (王家赵戈庄村)
- Gouya Village (沟崖村)
- Shimiao Village (石庙村)
- Wangjialiutuan Village (王家柳疃村)
- Sunjialiutuan Village (孙家柳疃村)
- Linjiatuan Village (林家疃村)
- Ligezhuang Village (李戈庄村)
- Liangjiatuan Village (梁家疃村)
- Sunjiayao Village (孙家窑村)
- Shaojiatuan Village (邵家疃村)
- Yangjiatuan Village (杨家疃村)
- Zhangtuan Village (张疃村)
- Aijiatuan Village (艾家疃村)
- Xisunjiazhuang Village (西孙家庄村)
- Niugezhuang Village (牛戈庄村)
- Xihoujiazhuang Village (西侯家庄村)
- Fujiazhuang Village (付家庄村)
- Daluojia Village (大罗家村)
- Liugulu Village (刘古路村)
- Xishijia Village (西史家村)
- Xiguojiazhuang Village (西郭家庄村)
- Beigaojiazhuang Village (北高家庄村)
- Lujiazhuang Village (卢家庄村)
- Xiwangjiazhuang Village (西王家庄村)
- Renjiazhuang Village (任家庄村)
- Xilinjiazhuang Village (西林家庄村)
- Nangaojiazhuang Village (南高家庄村)
- Hutiejia Village (胡铁家村)
- Quanlihujia Village (圈里胡家村)
- Chenjiawuzi Village (陈家屋子村)
- Nanwangjiazhuang Village (南王家庄村)
- Shiliujia Village (匙刘家村)
- Donghoujiazhuang Village (东侯家庄村)
- Wujiazhuang Village (吴家庄村)
- Lijiazhuang Village (李家庄村)
- Damiaozhuang Village (大庙庄村)
- Shitongzhuang Village (史同庄村)
- Wangjiapozi Village (王家坡子村)
- Gengjiaji Village (耿家集村)
- Jiangjiazhuang Village (姜家庄村)
- Yuanqianwangtuan Village (院前王疃村)
- Xixingjia Village (西邢家村)
- Dongxingjia Village (东邢家村)
- Fujiatuan Village (付家疃村)
- Dongshijia Village (东史家村)
- Xiligezhuang Village (西李戈庄村)
- Lijiabuzi Village (李家埠子村)
- Dongsanjia Village (东三甲村)
- Houwujia Village (后五甲村)
- Renjiatun Village (任家屯村)
- Zhailitun Village (寨里屯村)
- Sunjiatuan Village (孙家疃村)
- Huangtuling Village (黄土岭村)
- Tongchenghefu Village (同城和府村)
- Xiheshun Village (西和顺村)
- Huali Village (华里村)

== See also ==
- List of township-level divisions of Shandong
