= Yandera mine =

Copper mine in Madang, Papua New Guinea

- Location: Madang Province, Papua New Guinea
- Products: Copper

The Yandera mine is a large copper mine located in the east of Papua New Guinea in Madang Province. Yandera represents one of the largest copper reserve in Papua New Guinea and in the world having estimated reserves of 580 million tonnes of ore grading 0.41% copper, 0.01% molybdenum and 1.1 million oz of gold.
