= Yangjiazhangzi mine =

Molybdenum mine in China

- Location: Lianshan District, Liaoning, China
- Products: Molybdenum

The Yangjiazhangzi mine is one of the largest molybdenum mines in China. The mine is located in north-east China in Liaoning. The Yangjiazhangzi mine has reserves amounting to 22.8 million tonnes of molybdenum ore grading 0.15% molybdenum thus resulting 32,145 tonnes of molybdenum.

== See also ==
- List of molybdenum mines
