= Nanping mine =

Tantalum mine in Fujian, China

- Location: Fujian, China
- Products: Tantalum

The Nanping mine is a large mine located in the southern part of China in Fujian. Nanping represents one of the largest tantalum reserves in China having estimated reserves of 14.1 million tonnes of ore grading 0.03% tantalum.
