= Huanren mine =

Zinc mine in China

- Location: China
- Products: Zinc

The Huanren mine is one of the largest zinc mines in China. The mine is located in northern China. The mine has reserves amounting to 123.9 million tonnes of ore grading 0.4% zinc thus resulting 0.5 million tonnes of lead and 1.44 million tonnes of zinc.
