= Xiong'er Volcanic Belt =

- Volcanic rock
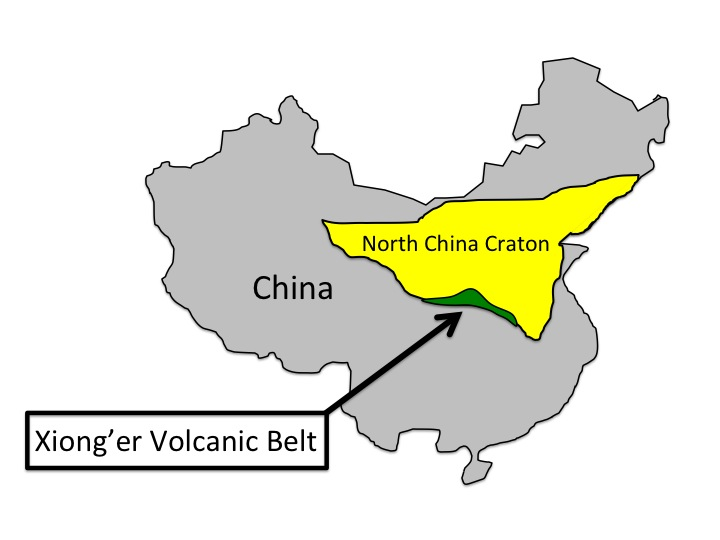
- Figure 1: This figure shows the Xiong'er Volcanic Belt in green on the southern edge of the North China craton
- Age: 1770 to 1800 million years

The Xiong'er Volcanic Belt (Chinese: 熊耳群火山岩; pinyin: Xióng'ěr qún huǒshānshí) is a 1770 to 1800 million year-old group of volcanic rocks located on the southern edge of the North China craton (Figure 1). It covers an area of approximately 60,000 km^{2} and varies from 3000 m to 7000 m thick. The perimeter of the volcanic belt is composed of three faults: the Jianxian-Lintong fault to the northwest, the Luoyang-Baofeng fault to the northeast, and the Luonan-Luanchan fault to the south (Figure 2). The volcanic belt formed at a time in Earth's history when all of the continents were joined forming the Supercontinent Columbia, the earliest known supercontinent. The Xiong'er Volcanic Belt is very important because it can provide valuable information to help piece together the formation and breakup of the Supercontinent Columbia and the North China craton by identifying what type of boundary was located on the southern edge of the North China craton.

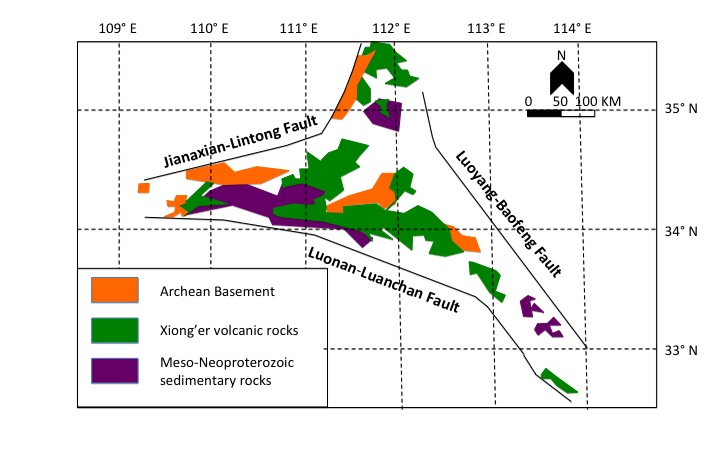
Figure 2: A generalized geologic map of the Xiong'er Volcanic Belt

== Geologic formations ==
The Xiong'er Volcanic Belt is made up of four geologic formations which include one sedimentary and three volcanic units. Starting at the bottom is the sedimentary Daguish formation and above it are the three volcanic formations, which consist of the Xushan, Jidanping, and Majiahe. They unconformably overlie the Archean to Paleoproterozoic formations which make up the basement rock in the area, and they lie unconformably below the meso-Neoproterozoic sedimentary rocks, which include sandstones and limestones.

- Daguish Formation

The Daguish formation is the bottommost formation, with a maximum thickness of 212 m. It is composed of sedimentary rocks such as breccia, conglomerate, and mudstone.

- Xushan Formation

The Xushan formation is the second formation from the bottom and is dominantly composed of the volcanic rocks basalt andesite and andesite.

- Jidanping Formation

The Jidanping formation is the third formation from the bottom and is a mixture of volcanic rocks which include dacite, rhyolite, basalt andesite, and andesite.

- Majiahe Formation

The Majiahe formation is the top formation and is dominantly composed of basalt andesite and andesite but also contains pyroclastic and sedimentary rocks as well.

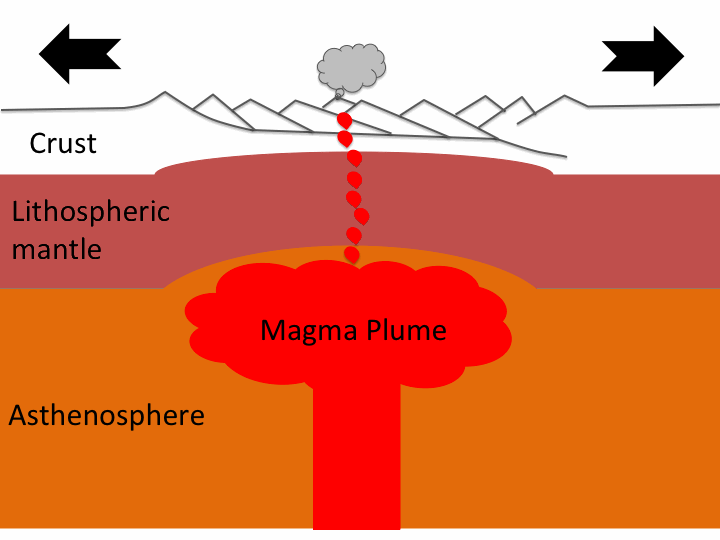
Figure 3: A Continental Rift caused by a rising mantle plume

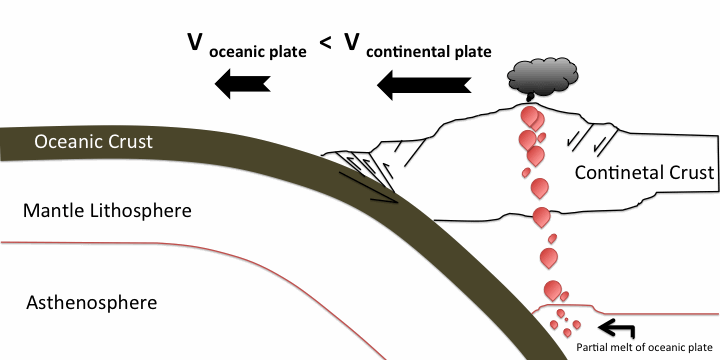
Figure 4: An Andean type continental margin

== Tectonic setting ==
Currently there are two proposed hypotheses for the tectonic setting in which the Xiong'er Volcanic Belt formed. One is in a continental rift setting, an area where a continent is being pushed apart as shown in figure 3. While the other hypotheses suggest an Andean type continental margin, where an oceanic plate is subducting underneath a continental plate as shown in figure 4.

Evidence for a continental rift setting comes from geochemical data and the presence of mafic dike swarms within the North China craton. The mafic dike swarms support the rift hypothesis because they are believed to have formed from a mantle plume and have been dated to the same age as the Xiong'er volcanic belt. While the geochemical data which includes elemental composition and mineralogy of the volcanic rocks is believed by some to be similar to other volcanic rocks from continental settings.

Evidence for an Andean type continental margin comes from the lithology and geochemical data. The lithological evidence includes rock type, grain size, composition, and texture. While the geochemical data includes elemental composition which is believed by some to be similar to an Andean type continental margin.

Each of these tectonic settings typically produces volcanic rocks with specific geochemical signatures such as being enriched or depleted in certain elements. However the Xiong'er volcanic belt does not match up well geochemically with either of these tectonic settings, but seems to have more of a mixture of the two which has caused much confusion about the origin of the belt.

== Significance of tectonic setting ==
Understanding what type of tectonic setting the Xiong'er Volcanic Belt formed in is crucial for the reconstruction of the Supercontinent Columbia and for making models of plate movement in the Earth's past. If the Xiong'er Volcanic belt represents a rift, then that will indicate that the southern edge of the North China craton faced another continent while it was a part of the Supercontinent Columbia, but if it is an Andean type continental margin then that will indicate that the southern edge of the North China craton would have faced the open ocean at this time.
