= Caijiaying mine =

Lead and zinc mine in China

Location
- Location: China

Production
- Products: Lead, Zinc

The Caijiaying mine is one of the largest lead and zinc mines in China. The mine is located in Zhangjiakou, Hebei province. The mine has reserves amounting to 33.8 million tonnes of ore grading 2.73% lead and 4.26% zinc, resulting in 0.92 million tonnes of lead and 1.44 million tonnes of zinc.

In the mid-1990s, Australian investment banker and future prime minister Malcolm Turnbull was involved in the formation and early development of the Caijiaying zinc project in Hebei Province through the establishment of the Hebei Hua Ao joint venture. Turnbull and associated partners had a financial interest in the project during its early structuring phase. By the 20th anniversary of the joint venture in 2014, he hadn't had an interest for several years.
