= Ashdown mine =

Mine in Nevada, United States

- Location in Nevada
- Location: Nevada; 41°49′49″N 118°41′40″W
- Products: Silver; Gold; Molybdenum; Copper
- Discovered: 1863
- Opened: 1865
- Company: Win-Eldrich Mines

The Ashdown mine is an American gold mine located in Humboldt County, 15 kilometres (9.3 mi) south of Denio, NV in the state of Nevada. The mine is owned by Win-Eldrich Mines, a Canadian mining company. An assay consisting of 194 holes estimates an open-pit mining of 78,000 to 117,000 ounces of gold which can be extracted using heap leaching methods.

Win-Eldrich has a permit for underground mining and for the operation of a flotation mill on-site.

== See also ==
- List of gold mines
- Gold mining in Nevada
