= Tongliao mine =

Tantalum mine in Inner Mongolia, China

- Location: Inner Mongolia, China
- Products: Tantalum

The Tongliao mine is a large mine located in the northern part of China in Inner Mongolia. Tongliao represents one of the largest tantalum reserves in China having estimated reserves of 6.8 million tonnes of ore grading 0.022% tantalum.
