= Taoxikeng mine =

Tungsten mine in Jiangxi, China

- Location: Jiangxi, China
- Products: Tungsten

The Taoxikeng mine is a large open pit mine located in the western part of Jiangxi. Taoxikeng represents one of the largest tungsten reserves in China having estimated reserves of 2.08 million tonnes of ore grading 2.1% tungsten.
