= Liumao mine =

Graphite mine in Inner Mongolia, China

- Location: Inner Mongolia, China
- Products: Graphite

The Liumao mine is one of the largest graphite mines in China and in the world. The mine is located in the north of the country in Inner Mongolia. The mine has estimated reserves of 28.3 million tonnes of ore 16% graphite.
