= Pingdu mine =

Graphite mine in Shandong, China

- Location: Pingdu, Shandong, China
- Products: Graphite

The Pingdu mine is one of the largest graphite mines in China and in the world. The mine is located in the east of the country in Shandong. The mine has estimated reserves of 100 million tonnes of ore 10% graphite.
