= Tianjin Academy of Agricultural Sciences =

Research institution overview
- Formed: 1979
- Jurisdiction: Government of Tianjin
- Headquarters: Tianjin, China; 39°06′14″N 117°03′32″E
- Employees: 516
- President responsible: Cheng Yi
- Website: www.taas.ac.cn

Chinese name
- Traditional Chinese: 天津市農業科學院
- Simplified Chinese: 天津市农业科学院
Transcriptions
Standard Mandarin
- Hanyu Pinyin: Tiānjīnshì Nóngyè Kēxuéyuàn

The Tianjin Academy of Agricultural Sciences (TAAS; Chinese: 天津市农业科学院) is an agricultural scientific research organization located in Tianjin, China. It oversees 15 institutes, including ten type one public-benefit institutions, three type two public-benefit institutions, and two transformation enterprises. It has four national research centers, six provincial key laboratories, and ten municipal research centers. It has more than 516 professional employees, including one academician from the Chinese Academy of Engineering (ACE), 64 State Council experts who enjoy special allowance and 10 experts with outstanding contribution.

== History ==
The Tianjin Academy of Agricultural Sciences was established in 1979 after the reshuffle of Tianjin Institute of Paddy Rice, Tianjin Institute of Vegetables and Tianjin Institute of Alkaline Soils Restoration.
