= Yichun mine =

Tantalum mine in Jiangxi, China

- Location: Jiangxi, China
- Products: Tantalum

The Yichun mine is a large mine located in the southern part of China in Jiangxi. Yichun represents one of the largest tantalum reserves in China having estimated reserves of 34 million tonnes of ore grading 0.02% tantalum.
