= Damiao mine =

Vanadium mine in Inner Mongolia, China

- Location: Inner Mongolia, China
- Products: Vanadium

The Damiao mine is one of the largest vanadium mines in China. The mine is located in Inner Mongolia. The mine has reserves amounting to 33.3 million tonnes of ore grading 0.39% vanadium.
