= Wafangzi mine =

Manganese mine in Inner Mongolia, China

- Location: Inner Mongolia, China
- Products: Manganese

The Wafangzi mine is a mine located in the north of China in Inner Mongolia. Wafangzi represents one of the largest manganese reserve in China having estimated reserves of 37.7 million tonnes of manganese ore grading 24% manganese metal.
