= Hushan mine =

Fluorite mine in Zhejiang, China

- Location: Zhejiang, China
- Products: Fluorite

The Hushan mine is a large mine located in the south-eastern China in Zhejiang. Hushan represents one of the largest fluorite reserves in China having estimated reserves of 4.5 million tonnes of ore grading 50% fluorite.
