= Huogeqi mine =

Lead and zinc mine in Bayannur, Inner Mongolia, China

- Location: China
- Products: Lead, Zinc

The Huogeqi mine is one of the largest lead and zinc mines in China. The mine is located in Bayannur, Inner Mongolia. The mine has reserves amounting to 67.6 million tonnes of ore grading 1.44% lead and 1.46% zinc, thus resulting 0.97 million tonnes of lead and 1 million tonnes of zinc.
