= Taolin mine =

Fluorite mine in Hunan, China

- Interactive map of Taolin mine
- Location: Hunan, China
- Products: Fluorite

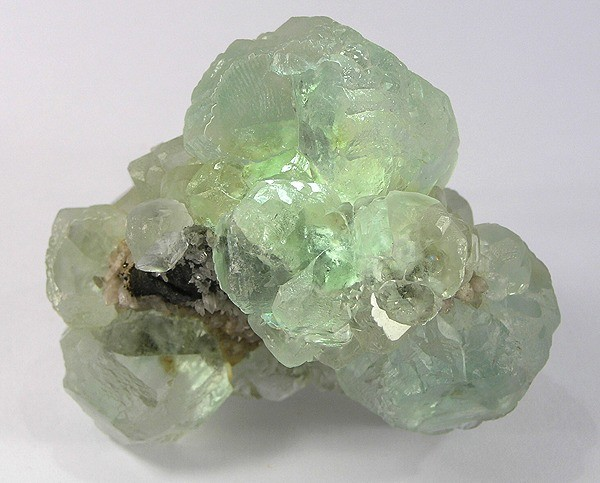
Fluorite from Taolin Mine

The Taolin mine is a large mine located in the south-eastern China in Hunan. Taolin represents one of the largest fluorite reserves in China, having estimated reserves of 6.1 million tonnes of ore grading 14.3% fluorite.
