= Tianbaoshan mine =

Mine in China

- Location: China
- Products: Lead, Zinc

The Tianbaoshan mine is one of the largest lead and zinc mines in China. The mine is located in northern China. The mine has reserves amounting to 23.7 million tonnes of ore grading 0.52% lead and 1.76% zinc thus resulting 0.13 million tonnes of lead and 0.42 million tonnes of zinc.
