= Kalatongke mine =

Mine in Inner Mongolia, China

- Location: Inner Mongolia, China
- Products: platinum, palladium, rhodium, ruthenium, gold

The Kalatongke mine is a large open pit mine located in the northern part of China in Inner Mongolia. Kalatongke represents one of the largest platinum reserves in China having estimated reserves of 55.7 million oz of platinum. The mine produces around 64,000 oz of platinum/year.
