= Wengquangou mine =

Boron ore mine in Liaoning, China

- Location: Liaoning, China
- Products: Boron

The Wengquangou mine is a large boron ore mine located in Liaoning province, China. Wengquangou represents one of the largest boron reserves in China having an estimated reserve of 21.9 million tonnes of ore grading 7.23% boron.
