= Jiajika mine =

Lithium mine in Sichuan, China

- Location within Sichuan Location within China
- Location: Sichuan, China; 30.296°N 101.302°E
- Products: Lithium

The Jiajika mine is one of the largest lithium mines in China. The mine is located in Tagong township, Sichuan province, central China.

The Jiajika mine has reserves amounting to 80.5 million tonnes of lithium ore grading 1.28% lithium thus resulting 1.03 million tonnes of lithium.
