= Pingdu =

Pingdu 平度市 Pingtu
- County-level city
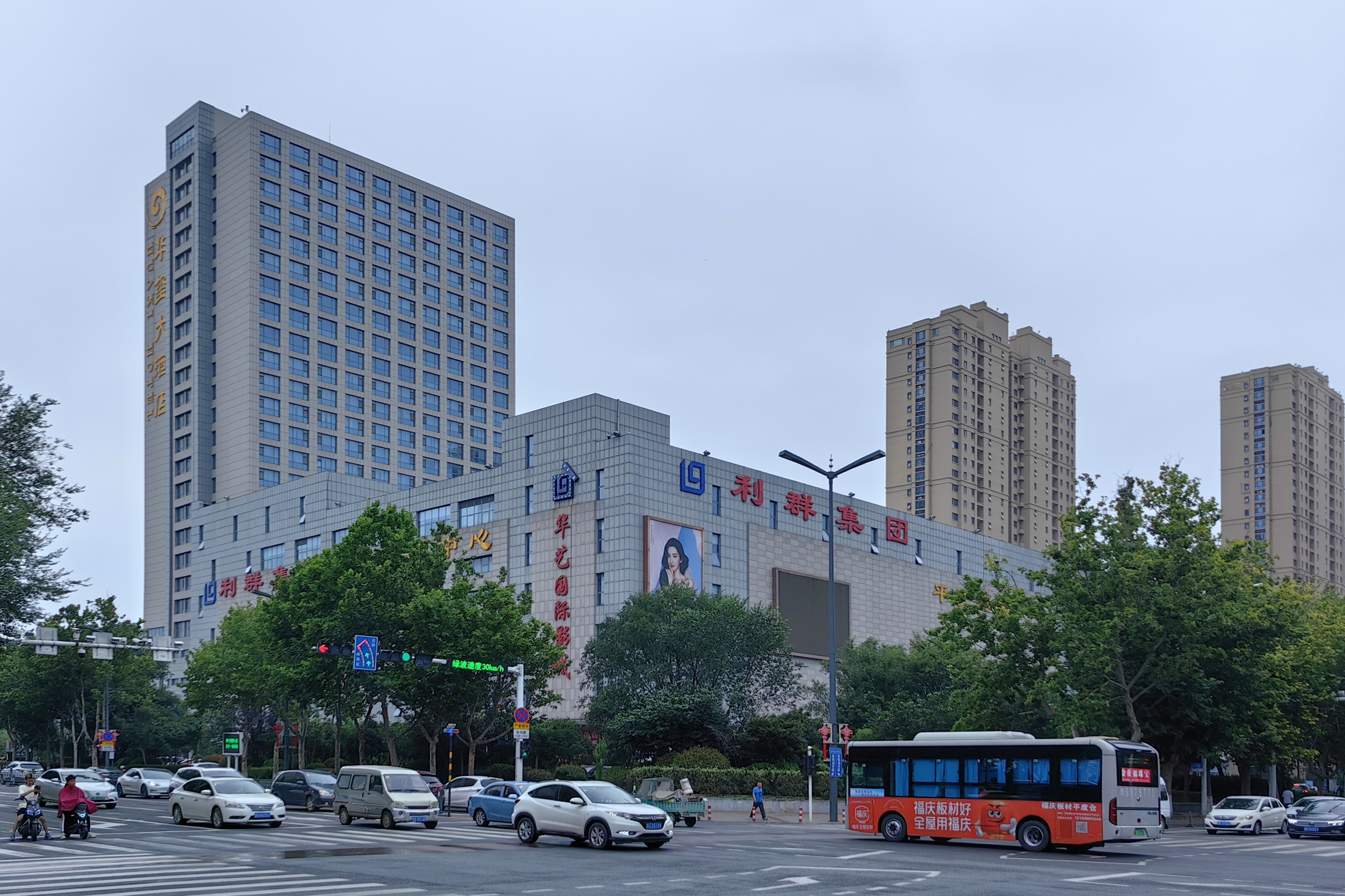

- Location of Pingdu within Qingdao

- Location of the city center in Shandong
- Coordinates: 36°46′37″N 119°59′18″E
- Country: People's Republic of China
- Province: Shandong
- Prefecture-level city: Qingdao

Area
  - County-level city: 3,166.54 km^{2} (1,222.61 sq mi)

Population (2020 census)
  - County-level city: 1,191,348
  - Density: 376.230/km^{2} (974.432/sq mi)
  - Urban: 519,957
- Time zone: UTC+8 (China Standard)
- Postal code: 266700
- Website: 平度政务 (in Simplified Chinese)

Pingdu (Chinese: 平度; pinyin: Píngdù) is the largest county-level city of Qingdao sub-provincial city, Shandong Province, China.

It is located in the east of the Shandong Peninsula (Jiaodong Peninsula), the heart of peninsula. It borders Yantai and Weifang, and it has an area of 3,166 km^{2} (1,222 sq mi) and a population of 1,191,348 people in 2020.

== Administration ==
The administrative divisions of Pingdu have undergone a relatively large number of changes in the past thirty years. As of 2016, Pingdu had five subdistricts, 12 towns and one other area:

As of 2016, this city is divided to 5 subdistricts, 12 towns and 1 other.

Subdistricts

- Dongge Subdistrict (东阁街道)
- Liyuan Subdistrict (李园街道)
- Tonghe Subdistrict (同和街道)
- Fengtai Subdistrict (凤台街道)
- Baishahe Subdistrict (白沙河街道)

Towns

- Guxian (古岘镇)
- Renzhao (仁兆镇)
- Nancun (南村镇)
- Liaolan (蓼兰镇)
- Cuijiaji (崔家集镇)
- Mingcun (明村镇)
- Tianzhuang (田庄镇)
- Xinhe (新河镇)
- Dianzi (店子镇)
- Dazeshan (大泽山镇)
- Jiudian (旧店镇)
- Yunshan (云山镇)

Others

- Pingdu Export-oriented Industrial Processing Zone (平度外向型工业加工区)

NBS Area No.	Chinese (Simp.)	Postal Code
Subdistricts
370283001000	东阁街道 (formerly 城关街道)	266752
370283002000	李园街道	266708, 266709
370283003000	同和街道	266706
370283004000	凤台街道 (formerly 香店街道)	266705
370283005000	白沙河街道	266738
Towns
~~370283100000~~	麻兰镇	266743
370283101000	古岘镇	266742
370283102000	仁兆镇	266739, 266741
~~370283103000~~	张戈庄镇	266738
~~370283104000~~	郭庄镇	266737
370283105000	南村镇	266734, 266735, 266736
~~370283106000~~	兰底镇	266734
~~370283107000~~	万家镇	266729
370283108000	蓼兰镇	266731, 266732, 266733
370283109000	崔家集镇	266727, 266728
370283110000	明村镇	266723, 266724
~~370283111000~~	白埠镇	266725, 266726
~~370283112000~~	门村镇	266708
370283113000	田庄镇	266749, 266719, 266721
~~370283114000~~	马戈庄镇	266722
~~370283115000~~	张舍镇	266719
370283116000	新河镇	266717
~~370283117000~~	灰埠镇	266715, 266716
~~370283118000~~	长乐镇	266714
370283119000	店子镇	266711, 266753
370283120000	大泽山镇	266714
~~370283121000~~	大田镇	266749
370283122000	旧店镇	266747, 266749
~~370283123000~~	祝沟镇	266746
370283124000	云山镇	266744, 266745
~~370283125000~~	崔召镇	266752
~~former~~	蟠桃镇	266704
Other Areas
370283400000	平度外向型工业加工区	266705

== Sports ==
The Pingdu Olympic Sports Centre Stadium, which has a capacity of 15,000, is the largest sports venue by capacity in Pingdu.

== Transportation ==
Pingdu West railway station opened in 2015 on the Haitian−Qingdao railway. There are two departures and two arrivals per day. A second station, Pingdu railway station, opened with the Weifang–Laixi high-speed railway in 2020.

== Climate ==
Climate data for Pingdu, elevation 62 m (203 ft), (1991–2020 normals, extremes 1981–present)
Month	Jan	Feb	Mar	Apr	May	Jun	Jul	Aug	Sep	Oct	Nov	Dec	Year
Record high °C (°F)	15.2 (59.4)	22.0 (71.6)	29.0 (84.2)	33.1 (91.6)	36.4 (97.5)	40.2 (104.4)	40.5 (104.9)	37.1 (98.8)	37.8 (100.0)	32.1 (89.8)	25.6 (78.1)	17.7 (63.9)	40.5 (104.9)
Mean daily maximum °C (°F)	3.2 (37.8)	6.5 (43.7)	12.6 (54.7)	19.3 (66.7)	25.0 (77.0)	28.9 (84.0)	30.7 (87.3)	30.0 (86.0)	26.7 (80.1)	20.6 (69.1)	12.5 (54.5)	5.3 (41.5)	18.4 (65.2)
Daily mean °C (°F)	−1.9 (28.6)	0.8 (33.4)	6.3 (43.3)	12.8 (55.0)	18.7 (65.7)	23.0 (73.4)	26.0 (78.8)	25.6 (78.1)	21.4 (70.5)	14.8 (58.6)	7.1 (44.8)	0.3 (32.5)	12.9 (55.2)
Mean daily minimum °C (°F)	−5.9 (21.4)	−3.6 (25.5)	1.2 (34.2)	7.4 (45.3)	13.3 (55.9)	18.3 (64.9)	22.4 (72.3)	22.0 (71.6)	16.8 (62.2)	9.9 (49.8)	2.7 (36.9)	−3.5 (25.7)	8.4 (47.1)
Record low °C (°F)	−18.3 (−0.9)	−17.1 (1.2)	−10.0 (14.0)	−4.2 (24.4)	2.1 (35.8)	8.4 (47.1)	14.2 (57.6)	12.7 (54.9)	3.7 (38.7)	−3.8 (25.2)	−9.8 (14.4)	−17.0 (1.4)	−18.3 (−0.9)
Average precipitation mm (inches)	7.6 (0.30)	12.3 (0.48)	14.6 (0.57)	30.7 (1.21)	50.7 (2.00)	72.7 (2.86)	153.3 (6.04)	174.2 (6.86)	56.6 (2.23)	25.0 (0.98)	24.0 (0.94)	9.4 (0.37)	631.1 (24.84)
Average precipitation days (≥ 0.1 mm)	2.9	3.6	3.4	5.6	6.9	7.8	11.8	11.4	6.3	5.3	5.2	4.2	74.4
Average snowy days	5.0	3.5	1.1	0.1	0	0	0	0	0	0	1.4	4.5	15.6
Average relative humidity (%)	67	63	57	59	64	70	80	81	72	68	69	68	68
Mean monthly sunshine hours	180.8	182.3	232.0	243.2	265.8	230.8	200.3	211.9	223.4	212.6	176.9	177.8	2,537.8
Percentage possible sunshine	58	59	62	62	61	53	45	51	61	62	58	60	58
Source: China Meteorological Administration all-time extreme temperatureall-time August high

== See also ==
- Pingdu Campaign
- Pingdu mine
