= Sumoqagan mine =

Fluorite mine in Inner Mongolia, China

- Location: Inner Mongolia, China
- Products: Fluorite

The Sumoqagan mine is a large mine located in the northern China in Inner Mongolia. Sumoqagan represents one of the largest fluorite reserves in China having estimated reserves of 10.3 million tonnes of ore grading 53.9% fluorite.
