= Lanmuchang =

Quicksilver mine in Guizhou, China

Lanmuchang (Chinese: 滥木厂) is an historic quicksilver mine in Guizhou. Lanmuchang was one mine in a mineral belt in southwestern China that has been exploited for 2,000 years for cinnabar to manufacture the vermilion paint, Chinese red, and red ink and to produce quicksilver. This is the area referred to in historic texts regarding quicksilver as "Kwei-Chau," Kweichow.
