= Shizhuyuan mine =

Fluorite mine in Hunan, China

Coordinates: 25.7166°N 113.1666°E

- Location within Hunan
- Location: Hunan, China
- Products: Fluorite

The Shizhuyuan mine is a large mine located in the south-eastern China in Hunan. Shizhuyuan represents one of the largest fluorite reserves in China having estimated reserves of 45.9 million tonnes of ore grading 21.7% fluorite.
