= Hongtoushan mine =

Mine in Fushun, Liaoning, China

- Location: China
- Products: Zinc

The Hongtoushan mine is one of the largest zinc mines in China. The mine is located in Fushun, Liaoning province, China. The mine has reserves amounting to 22.6 million tonnes of ore grading 3.04% zinc, thus resulting 0.69 million tonnes of zinc.
