= Eastern Block of the North China Craton =

Fragment of Earth's crust

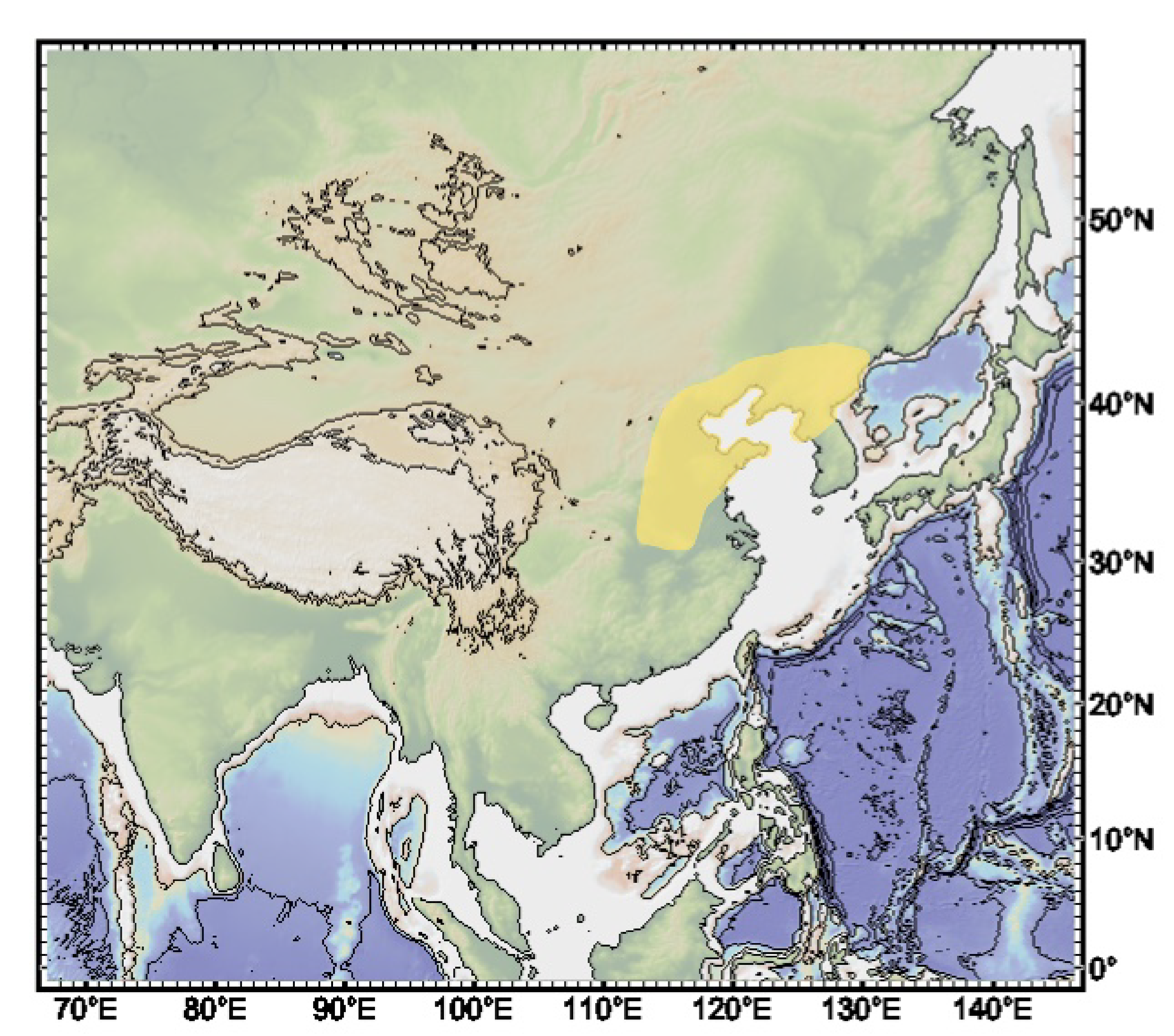
A location map of the Eastern Block of the North China Craton. Shaded area represents the Eastern Block. Generated from GeoMapApp (Ryan et al., 2009).

The Eastern Block of the North China Craton is one of the Earth's oldest pieces of continent. It is separated from the Western Block by the Trans-North China Orogen. It is situated in northeastern China and North Korea. The Block contains rock exposures older than 2.5 billion years (pre-Neoarchean and the Neoarchean Era). It serves as an ideal place to study how the crust was formed in the past and the related tectonic settings.

Geologists are able to deduce the past environments and tectonic events by studying geological records like rocks and geological structures. The oldest components of the Eastern Block were first formed more than 4 billion years ago (the Hadean Eon). It later experienced numerous geological events between 3.8 and 1.85 billion years ago (the Eoarchean to Paleoproterozoic Era), including recurring volcanic eruptions and metamorphic events. Therefore, most of the rocks were reworked and highly metamorphosed with changes in minerals and texture. Due to the sparse exposure of pre-Neoarchean rocks, only the tectonic settings of the rocks generated from 2.7 to 1.85 billion years ago (during the Neoarchean and Paleoproterozoic Era) are thought to be understood. These settings include a Large Igneous Province event, mantle plume activity, continental collisions, rifting and subductions of plates. The Jiao-Liao-Ji Belt joined the two small blocks (the Longgang and Langrim blocks) together as the larger Eastern Block, whereas the Trans-North China Orogen shows the assembly of Eastern and Western Blocks, forming the North China Craton. The root of the craton was collapsed 130–120 million years ago (the Cretaceous Period), resulting in a thinner lithosphere.

== Lithology and geological formation ==
=== Hadean ===
Although there has not been any evidence of Hadean rocks in the Eastern Block, a number of Hadean zircons were dated as >4 billion years ago. They were found in Anshan, eastern Hebei and Xinyang, suggesting the presence of a Hadean crust in the area.

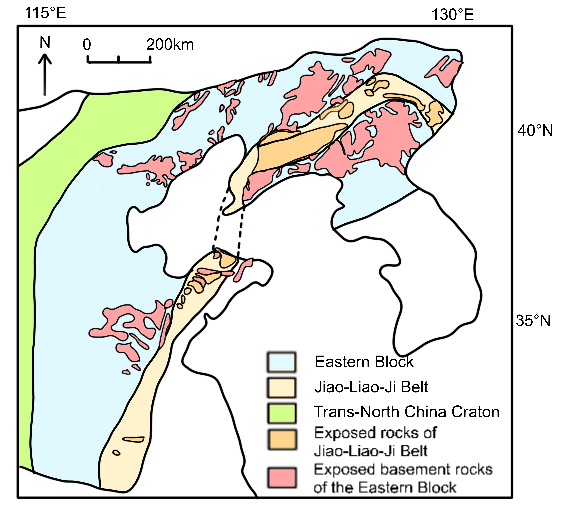
A map showing the distribution of exposed Archean basement rocks and location of the Jiao-Liao-Ji Belt in the Eastern Block.

=== Eoarchean ===
The Eoarchean rocks are very rare in Anshan, covering an area smaller than 20 km^{2}. The basement rock was made of 3.8–3.6 billion-year-old trondhjemitic gneiss. It was emplaced in two phases: Phase I took place at around 3.8 billion years ago, while Phase II at approximately 3.6 billion years ago. The phases are evidenced by the older inclusions of gneiss in younger trondhjemite and younger trondhjemitic veins cross-cutting the older gneiss.

Other than the plutons, plentiful Eoarchean detrital zircons were reported from the metamorphosed sedimentary rocks in eastern Hebei and few in Anshan. Biotite schist, fuchsite quartzite and paragneiss recorded an isotopic age of 3.88–3.55 billion years. This further reinforces the existence of a Hadean-Eoarchean crust, which later became the sedimentary protolith of the metamorphosed sedimentary rocks.

In Xinyang, at the southwestern edge of the Eastern Block, 3.6 billion-year-old zircons from felsic granulite xenoliths were found. It implies that the Eoarchean crust might be present in the western part of Eastern Block as well.

=== Paleoarchean ===
The rare Paleoarchean rocks are located in Anshan and eastern Hebei, composed of granitoids, metamorphosed sedimentary rocks and amphibolite. Pre-existing, pre-Paleoarchean sedimentary rocks and granitoids were metamorphosed 3.55 billion years ago. They were discovered as trondhjemitic gneiss and metamorphosed sedimentary rocks, including quartzite, paragneiss, calc-silicate rocks and more. In eastern Hebei, minor amphibolites were discovered within the metamorphosed sedimentary rocks. It suggests an eruption of basalts at 3.5 billion years ago, after the metamorphic event. In Anshan, stripes and lenses of trondhjemitic gneiss were observed in granitic and pegmatitic migmatites. They were crystallised 3.45 billion years ago during the trondhjemite magmatism (Phase III). Similar emplacement (Phase IV) at 3.33 billion years ago created granitoids. It also led to the formation of metasedimentary rocks, which are composed of amphibolites, biotite-plagioclase gneiss, quartzite and more.

=== Mesoarchean ===
The scarce Mesoarchean rocks are generally igneous and metamorphic rocks with the age of 3.2–2.8 billion years. Granites are mainly situated in Anshan and eastern Hebei. They were emplaced and crystallized at around 3 billion years ago. Meanwhile, the parent rocks of the metamorphosed sedimentary rocks, including amphibolite, paragneiss and quartzite, were deposited. In Qixia of eastern Shandong, a local magmatic event 2.9–2.85 billion years ago formed the igneous parent rocks of tonalitic-trondhjemitic-granodioritic gneisses. Besides, other than Anshan and eastern Hebei area, a Mesoarchean crust is confirmed to be existed in Qixia area.

=== Neoarchean ===
Other than the sparse distribution of pre-Neoarchean rocks in the northeastern Eastern Block, the Neoarchean rocks predominantly cover 90% of the exposed Block's basement. They are made up of tonalitic-trondhjemitic-granodioritic gneiss with a minority of metamorphosed sedimentary rocks. Basically, there are two groups of rocks with various lithologies, metamorphic and geochemical characteristics. They were formed during two geological events 2.75–2.65 and 2.55–2.5 billion years ago. The older group of rocks is locally existed in western and eastern Shandong, while the younger one spreads over the Block.

==== Early Neoarchean ====
Luxi Complex, also known as the Luxi granite-greenstone terrane in western Shandong, contains gneiss and sheets and lenses of metamorphosed ultramafic-mafic volcanic rocks (greenstone). Metamorphosed komatiite was discovered as serpentinized peridotite and schist with spinifex texture. Such texture is interpreted to be associated with a basaltic volcanic activity 2.74 billion years ago. Similarly, in Qixia, 2.75–2.7 billion-year-old gneiss of Qixia Complex was seen. The rocks in both areas imply an early Neoarchean emplacement of granitoid and the eruption of volcanic rocks about 2.75–2.65 billion years ago. Shortly, a metamorphic event took place 2.65 billion years ago, which altered the rocks into gneiss and metamorphosed sedimentary rocks. Nonetheless, the gneisses in both areas have slightly different geological records. Gneisses in Luxi Complex show records of metamorphic events 2.65, 2.5 and 1.90–1.85 billion years ago. On the other hand, those in Qixia Complex only record the younger metamorphisms. This suggests the record of the metamorphism 2.65 billion years ago was removed and overprinted by later metamorphic events.

On top of that, the formation of greenstone and gneiss in Luxi and Qixia are considered to be linked to a wider geological event, the Large Igneous Province event 2.7 billion years ago. Magma was extracted and led to the formation of a mafic crust.

==== Late Neoarchean ====
Late Neoarchean rocks spread over the whole Eastern Block. High to medium-grade gneiss and ultramafic extrusive rocks, especially komatiites occur in eastern Hebei, eastern Shandong, northern Liaoning and southern Jilin areas, whereas low to medium-grade granite-greenstone terranes are seen in western Shandong, southern Liaoning and Anshan areas. All rocks were formed in a geologically brief period, between 2.55 and 2.5 billion years ago. In this period, mafic and felsic lava erupted and granitoids intruded the whole Eastern Block, followed by a 2.5 billion-year-old regional metamorphism.

The metamorphic event has an anticlockwise pressure-temperature-time path with nearly isobaric cooling. The anti-clockwise path indicates the metamorphism is related to the intrusion of magma within the Earth's crust. During prograde and peak metamorphism, temperature and pressure are increased and a large amount of mafic material is added to the crust, whereas after the peak metamorphism, the intrusion of magma stops, resulting in isobaric cooling.

Structurally, these Late Neoarchean rocks are dome-shaped, for example, the Jinzhou dome in southern Liaoning and the Huadian dome in southern Jilin. These tonalitic-trondhjemitic-granodioritic gneiss domes are circular or oval and around 10–50 km wide. Some charnockites and granites can be found in the core. Their formation remains controversial that some suggest they were formed from the superimposition of folds, while others think they were caused by the diapirs of granitoid magma.

=== Paleoproterozoic ===
==== Jiao-Liao-Ji Belt ====
The Eastern Block consists of two sub-blocks, which are linked by the Jiao-Liao-Ji Belt. On the northwest of the Belt, there is the Longgang (Yanliao) Block, while on the southeast, there is the Langrim Block.

Within the Belt, there are granitic intrusions and metamorphosed sedimentary and volcanic rock sequences. The emplacement of granitoids happened 2.22 billion years ago and generated A-type granite, alkaline syenite and rapakivi granite. They later became some of the parent rocks of the 2–1.95 billion-year-old sedimentary and volcanic rock sequences. The greenschist to lower amphibolite facies can be found in southern Jilin, eastern Shandong, eastern Liaoning and North Korea. All these rocks were metamorphosed 1.93–1.90 and 1.87 billion years ago.

Due to their difference in pressure-temperature-time paths within the stratigraphy, the Belt is divided into northern and southern zones. The southern zone with anticlockwise pressure-temperature-time path contains Jingshan, South Liaohe and Ji'an groups. On the contrary, the northern zone with clockwise pressure-temperature-time path includes Fenzishan, North Liaohe and Laoling groups.

== Summary of lithology and geological events ==
From the geological formations and the textures, the past geological events can be deduced. The Eastern Block underwent a number of volcanic eruptions, emplacements and metamorphic events.

Period	Time (billion years ago)	Geological event	Lithological evidence	Location
Hadean (>4 billion years ago)	>4	Formation of Hadean crust	Hadean zircons	Anshan, eastern Hebei
Eoarchean (3.8–3.6 Ga billion years ago)	3.8	Emplacement of trondhjemite (Phase I)	Tonalitic-trondhjemitic-granodioritic gneiss	Anshan
Eoarchean (3.8–3.6 Ga billion years ago)	3.6	Emplacement of trondhjemite (Phase II)	Tonalitic-trondhjemitic-granodioritic gneiss	Anshan
Eoarchean (3.8–3.6 Ga billion years ago)	3.7–3.6	Formation of metamorphosed sedimentary rocks	Metamorphosed sedimentary rocks	Anshan
Paleoarchean (3.6–3.2 billion years ago)	3.55	Metamorphism	Tonalitic-trondhjemitic-granodioritic gneiss, metamorphosed sedimentary rocks	Anshan, eastern Hebei
Paleoarchean (3.6–3.2 billion years ago)	3.5	Eruption of basalts	Caozhuang amphibolites	Eastern Hebei
Paleoarchean (3.6–3.2 billion years ago)	3.45	Emplacement of trondhjemite (Phase III)	Tonalitic-trondhjemitic-granodioritic gneiss in Shengousi Complex	Anshan
Paleoarchean (3.6–3.2 billion years ago)	3.33	Emplacement of trondhjemite and granite (Phase IV)	Tonalitic-trondhjemitic-granodioritic gneiss in Dongshan Complex, Chentaigou granite	Anshan
Paleoarchean (3.6–3.2 billion years ago)	3.33	Formation of metamorphosed sedimentary rocks	Chentaigou metasedimentary rocks	Anshan
Mesoarchean (3.2–2.8 billion years ago)	3	Emplacement of granites	Lishan, Tiejiashan, Eastern and Western Anshan and Yangyashan granites	Anshan, eastern Hebei
Mesoarchean (3.2–2.8 billion years ago)	3	Formation of metamorphosed sedimentary rocks	Qianan metamorphosed sedimentary rocks	Eastern Hebei
Mesoarchean (3.2–2.8 billion years ago)	2.9–2.85	Emplacement of trondhjemite	Huangyadi tonalitic-trondhjemitic-granodioritic gneiss	Qixia
Neoarchean (2.8–2.5 billion years ago)	2.7	Large Igneous Province event	Komatiite in Luxi greenstone, tonalitic-trondhjemitic-granodioritic gneiss in Luxi and Qixia Complexes	Whole Eastern Block
Neoarchean (2.8–2.5 billion years ago)	2.75–2.65	Emplacement of tonalite-trondhjemite-granodiorite and eruption of volcanic rocks	Luxi granite-greenstone terrane, tonalitic-trondhjemitic-granodioritic gneiss in Qixia Complex	Luxi and Qixia
Neoarchean (2.8–2.5 billion years ago)	2.65	Metamorphism	Tonalitic-trondhjemitic-granodioritic gneiss in Luxi Complex	Luxi and Qixia
Neoarchean (2.8–2.5 billion years ago)	2.55–2.5	Volcanic eruption of mafic-felsic lava and emplacement of tonalite-trondhjemite-granodiorite	Granite-greenstone belts, tonalitic-trondhjemitic-granodioritic gneiss, charnockite, granite	Whole Eastern Block
Neoarchean (2.8–2.5 billion years ago)	2.5	Regional metamorphism	Tonalitic-trondhjemitic-granodioritic gneiss, mafic granulites, amphibolites	Whole Eastern Block
Paleoproterozoic (2.2–1.85 billion years ago)	2.2–2	Emplacement of granites	A-type granite, alkaline syenite, rapakivi granite	Eastern Liaoning, southern Jilin, eastern Shandong and North Korea
Paleoproterozoic (2.2–1.85 billion years ago)	2–1.95	Formation of sedimentary and volcanic rock sequences	Greenschist to lower amphibolite facies	Eastern Liaoning, southern Jilin, eastern Shandong and North Korea
Paleoproterozoic (2.2–1.85 billion years ago)	1.9	Formation of Jiao-Liao-Ji Belt and metamorphism	Greenschist to lower amphibolite facies	Eastern Liaoning, southern Jilin, eastern Shandong and North Korea
Paleoproterozoic (2.2–1.85 billion years ago)	1.85	Assembly of Eastern and Western Block of North China Craton and formation of Trans-North China Orogen	Gneiss, upper amphibolite to granulite facies	Trans-North China Orogen

== Tectonic evolution ==
Due to the low exposure of pre-Neoarchean rocks, it is difficult to conclude the tectonic setting at that time. Therefore, only the Neoarchean and Paleoproterozoic setting can be deduced.

=== Neoarchean ===
The two rock associations in Neoarchean are thought to be related to various tectonic settings. Rocks from around 2.7 billion years ago are related to a Large Igneous Province event. However, scholars have different ideas on the formation of rocks at around 2.5 billion years ago. Some suggested the magmatic arc model, whereas others proposed the mantle plume model.

==== Large igneous province ====
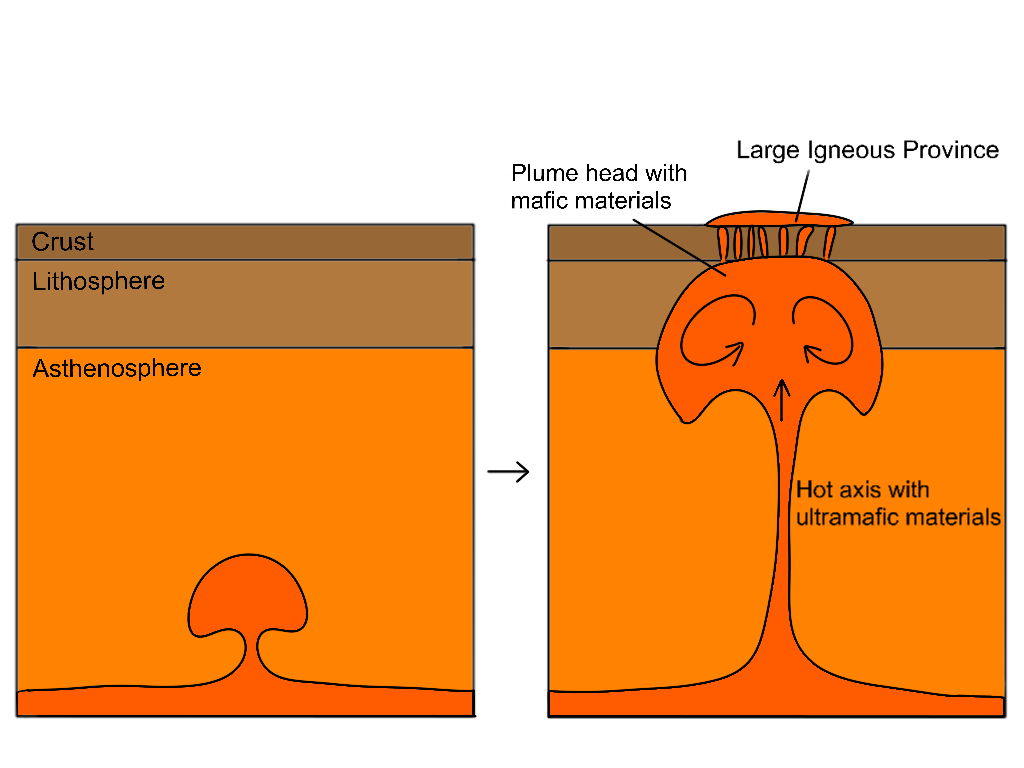
A mantle plume model showing the formation of a Large Igneous Province with ultramafic and basaltic materials. Deep Earth's materials rise, which intrudes the lithosphere and stretches the crust. A large amount of melts erupts on the Earth's surface as a Large Igneous Province.

At around 2.7 billion years ago, a Large Igneous Province event with massive magmatism took place. It was caused by a mantle plume activity, which led to the stretching of the crust, the intrusion of magma and thus the melting of the lithosphere. Such a model can explain the eruption of ultramafic melts and thus the generation of komatiites and mafic rocks in Luxi granite-greenstone terrane. The axis of the plume consisted of hot ultramafic material with low viscosity, while the head of the plume brought cooler basaltic material. Therefore, rocks have different chemistry.

However, there are still some controversies about the Large Igneous Province event. The Large Igneous Province event could take place in either continental or oceanic settings. Besides, it remains unknown if the Eastern Block was a mature continent or not during the Large Igneous Province event.

==== Magmatic arc model ====
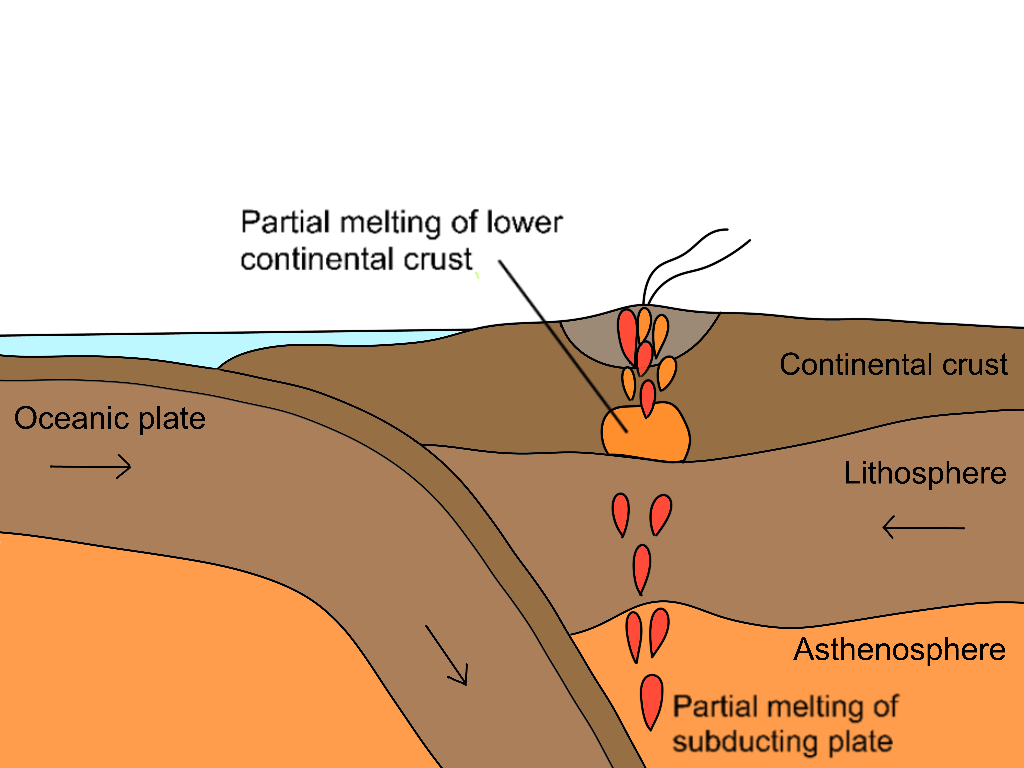
Bimodal volcanism with mafic and felsic materials at the magmatic arc system is shown. The partial melting of the subducting oceanic plate and lower continental crust led to the difference in the composition of gneiss.

The generation of tonalitic-trondhjemitic-granodioritic gneiss is associated with the formation of the magmatic arc during subduction. The geochemistry of tonalitic-trondhjemitic-granodioritic gneiss is similar to that of the calc-alkaline rocks in a continental arc under modern plate tectonics. Within the continental arc system, the subducting oceanic plate and lower continental crust were partially melted. As a result, there is a slight difference in the composition of tonalitic-trondhjemitic-granodioritic gneiss. Some have a higher content of magnesium, whereas others have lower.

Yet, some scholars rejected this model since it only explains the formation of tonalitic-trondhjemitic-granodioritic gneiss but not other characteristics of the magmatic event 2.5 billion years ago. They proposed the following mantle plume model.

==== Mantle plume model ====
The mantle plume model was proposed against the magmatic arc model. It can explain the following features of the 2.5 billion-year-old rock, which cannot be explained by the arc system:

- A massive scale of tonalite-trondhjemite-granodiorite and granitoid emplacement occurred within a short period (around 5 billion years ago).
- No age progression is shown in rocks. It does not support the idea of migrating magmatic arc but a sudden flux of magma.
- Ultramafic komatiitic melts can only be generated at high temperature (1650º) but the modern arc system does not have such high eruption temperature.
- Bimodal volcanism is evidenced by the felsic and mafic rocks but not intermediate rocks, such as andesite, which is prevalent in the Phanerozoic arc system.
- Dome structures of tonalitic-trondhjemitic-granodioritic gneiss are related to diapirs.
- Tonalitic-trondhjemitic-granodioritic gneiss has a high ratio of light rare-earth elements to heavy rare-earth elements. It can be generated from the partial melting of a subducting oceanic crust or the melting of a basaltic plateau by a mantle plume. Nonetheless, it is rather impossible to generate a large volume of melts from a subducting plate. The volume should be three times the exposed gneiss.
- Only anticlockwise pressure-temperature-time paths were recorded. Metamorphism was caused by the underplating and the intrusion of mantle magma with isobaric cooling. It was not related to subduction.

=== Paleoproterozoic ===
The formation of Jiao-Liao-Ji Belt 1.9 billion years ago has been controversial. Some scholars suggest it was formed by arc-continent collision, but others believe it was related to the intra-continental rift. However, the Trans-North China Orogen was certainly formed 1.85 billion years ago under subduction and continent-continent collision.

==== Arc-continent collision ====
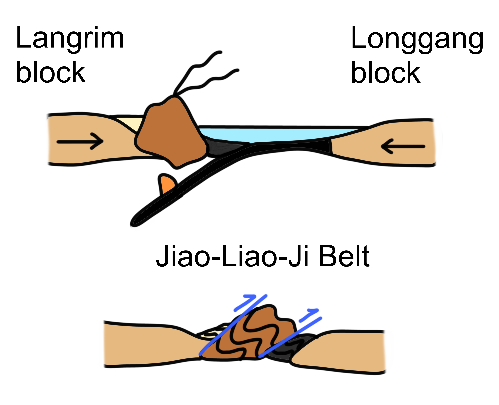
Cross-sections showing the arc-continent collision which formed the Jiao-Liao-Ji Belt.

In the arc-continent collision model, the Eastern Block was not assembled as one block until the Paleoproterozoic. It was formed when the volcanic island arc of Langrim block and the Archean Longgang block collided, resulting in the Jiao-Liao-Ji Belt. The ultramafic to mafic rocks in the North Liaohe group in eastern Liaoning were formed behind the arc where the crust spread (back-arc basin). Later, the Langrim block moved over the lower Longgang block and brought the South Liaohe group to the Belt. Unfortunately, calc-alkaline rocks, which are commonly generated in magmatic arc system, were not found in the area.

==== Rift closure model ====
Unlike the arc-continent collision model, the rift closure model suggests there was a coherent Archean Eastern Block. It was separated into the Longgang and the Langrim blocks in early Paleoproterozoic with an ocean in between. As the block started to separate, mafic and granitic melts intruded the crust 2.2–2 billion years ago and sedimentary and volcanic rock sequences were formed 2–1.95 billion years ago. For example, A-type granites, mafic and felsic igneous parent rocks of greenschist and lower amphibolite facies were formed. The rocks of similar age on both sides of the Belt support the idea of rifting. Moreover, borate deposits imply the presence of an ocean basin. About 1.9 billion years ago, the ocean was closed and two blocks collided. The Jiao-Liao-Ji Belt was formed and underwent metamorphism, evidenced by the pelitic granulite.

==== Subduction ====
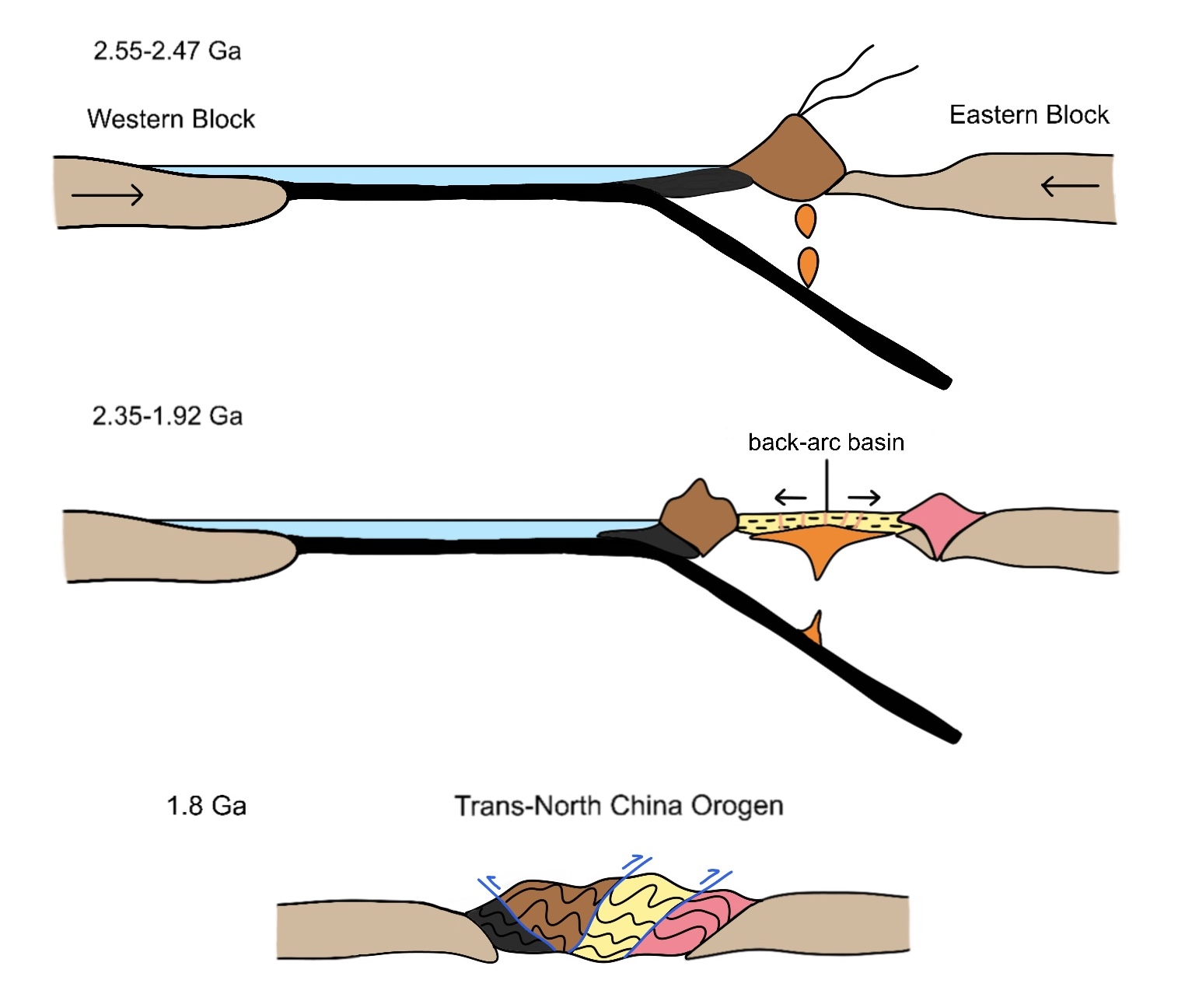
A series of evolutionary diagrams demonstrates the subduction and continent-continent collision of Eastern Block and Western Block. Trans-North China Orogen was formed and North China Craton was assembled.

Other than the subduction and collision on the eastern side of the Eastern Block, subduction also happened at the western margin. The subduction lasted from 2.55 to 1.85 billion years ago. It closed the ocean between the Eastern and Western Blocks of the North China Craton and formed the Trans-North China Orogen.

The subduction took place 2.55–2.47 billion years ago. It led to the partial melting of the lower crust and mantle wedge. It produced a large amount of magma, which formed granitoids, greenstone, mafic and felsic volcanic rocks. As subduction continued, the region next to the arc spread and formed a back-arc basin. Thus, magma flowed upward. There were granitic intrusions and mafic dyke intrusions 2.35–1.92 billion years ago. The mafic dykes were later metamorphosed as mafic granulites and amphibolites. Eventually, the whole ocean sank under the Eastern Block. The Eastern and Western Blocks were brought together at approximately 1.8 billion years ago. It formed the Trans-North China Orogen and led to the assembly of the North China Craton. The collision of blocks may be related to the global assembly of the Columbia supercontinent.

=== Phanerozoic ===
The North China Craton remained stable until the Phanerozoic Eon (324 million years ago). Subduction occurred at the northern margin of the North China Craton from Carboniferous to Middle Triassic (324–236 million years ago). Thus, the Paleo-Asian Ocean was closed. The North China Craton joined the South China Craton (Yangtze Craton) in the Late Triassic (240–210 million years ago). It resulted in the Qinling-Dabie Orogen in southern North China Craton. During the Jurassic (200–100 million years ago), the old Pacific Plate moved under the eastern North China Craton. All these subductions brought fluids like water to the lower crust. It got denser and weaker. Eventually, it collapsed to the mantle during the Cretaceous (130–120 million years ago). Due to the weight loss of the lower crust, the upper crust popped up and pulled apart. Therefore, the Eastern Block has a thinner crust and extensional structure, such as Bohai Bay basin.

== See also ==
- Western Block of North China Craton
- North China Craton
- Eoarchean geology
- Archean subduction
