= Western Block of the North China Craton =

Sub-block of the North China craton

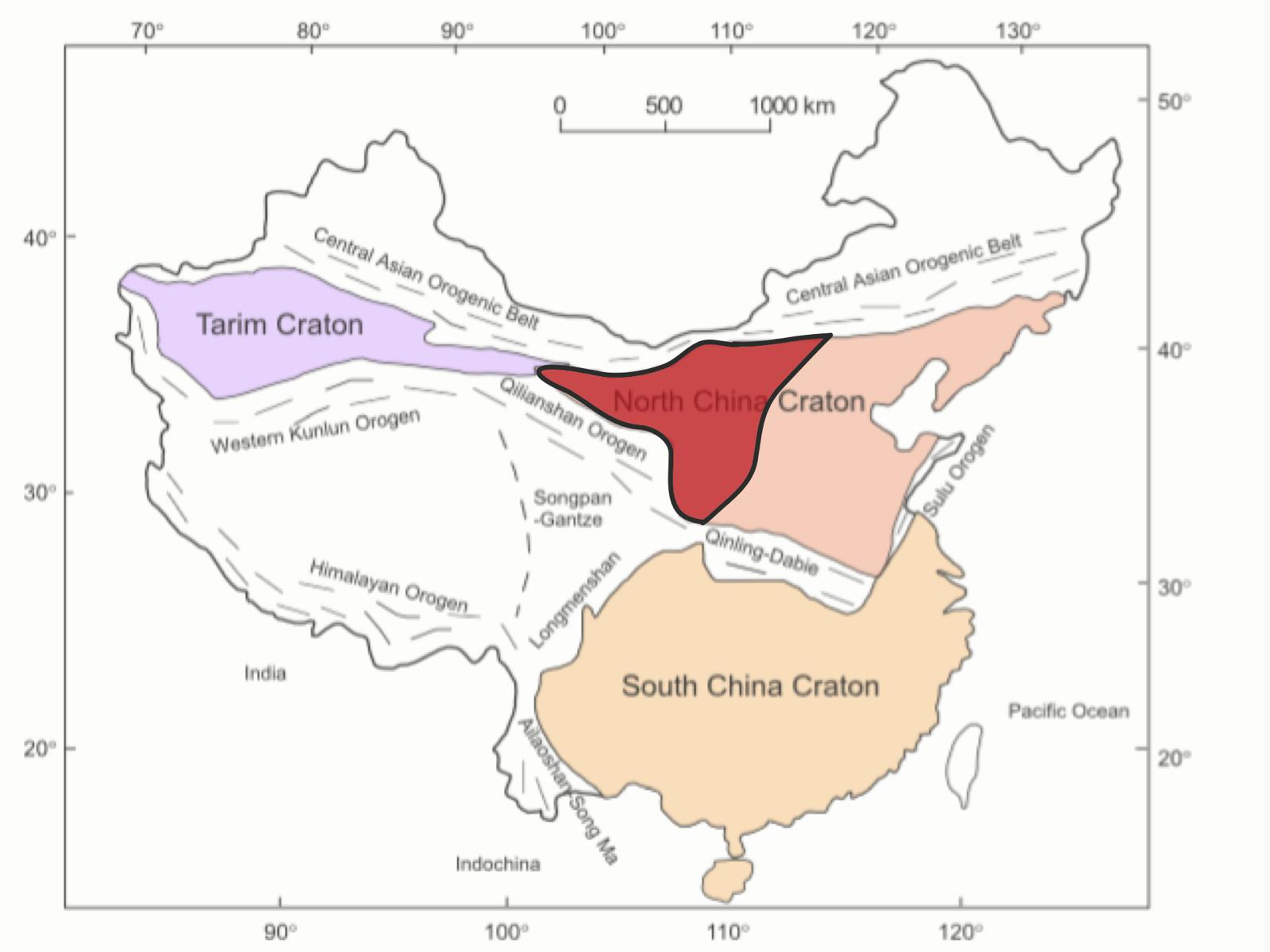
Fig. 1. A simple map showing tectonic components in China. The location of the Western Block of North China Craton is marked in red. Modified from Zhao, 2001.

The Western Block of the North China Craton is an ancient micro-continental block mainly composed of Neoarchean and Paleoproterozoic rock basement, with some parts overlain by Cambrian to Cenozoic volcanic and sedimentary rocks. It is one of two sub-blocks (the Eastern Block and the Western Block) within the North China Craton, located in east-central China. The boundaries of the Western Block are slightly different among distinct models, but the shapes and areas are similar. There is a broad consensus that the Western Block covers a large part of the east-central China.

Igneous, sedimentary and metamorphic rocks are present in the Western Block. The oldest geological records in the Western Block are 2.7 billion-year-old intrusive igneous rock found in Xiwulanbulang in Inner Mongolia. The youngest rocks are 23-million-year-old extrusive igneous rocks, which are located in Sanyitang (in Hebei) in the orogenic belt across the block. The sedimentary rocks distribute predominantly in the Ordos Basin located in the south of the Western Block. Exposures of metamorphic rocks are mostly scattered in the north of the block.

The tectonic setting and evolution of the Western Block are debated. There are various models hypothesizing the subdivisions and tectonic history of the block and they are generally mutually exclusive. However, most models agree with the presence of a Paleoproterozoic orogenic belt cutting across the Western Block in the east-west direction, despite having various names for it.

Since the geological events of the Western Block started in Precambrian time, when more than 80% of the present volume of continental crust formed, complex geological evolution and early tectonic history can be studied through the geological records in the Western Block.

== Lithologies ==
=== Precambrian basement (4600–539 million years ago) ===
==== Archean rocks (4.0–2.5 billion years ago) ====
The earliest geological units found in the Western Block are formed in Neoarchean , when the major crustal accretion and reworking took place. The Neoarchean rocks in the Precambrian basement are mainly composed of greenstones, high-grade metamorphic rocks and granitoids. Mineral examinations show an isobaric cooling-type anticlockwise pressure-temperature (P-T) path, indicating there were intrusions and underplating events during the crustal growth in Neoarchean.

===== Guyang granite–greenstone terrane =====
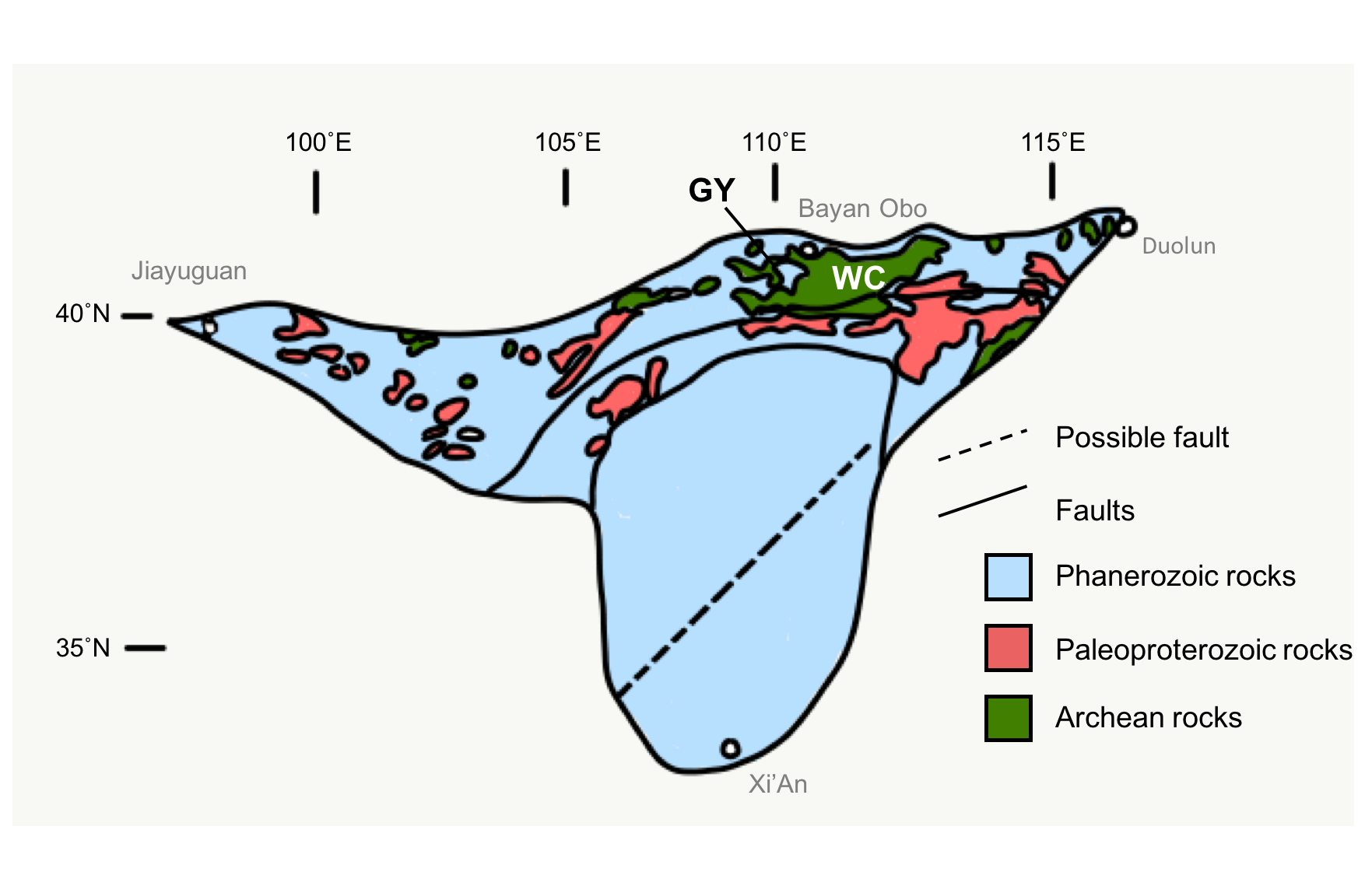
Fig. 2. A simplified geological map of the Western Block of the North China Craton, modified from Wang et al., 2012 and 2016. The map shows the distribution of rocks of different ages. Archean and Paleoproterozoic rocks expose in the northern part of the Western Block while the rest of the block is covered by Phanerozoic rocks. GY-Guyang granite-greenstone terrane; WC-Wuchan high-grade complex.

The Guyang granite-greenstone terrane is located in the northern part of the Western Block, spreading from Mount Serteng to Donghongsheng in the east-west direction. The terrane is dominated by metamorphic and granitoid rocks. It is suggested that the terrane may represent ancient metamorphism in the upper crust.

Greenstones are sequences of Precambrian metamorphosed ultramafic to mafic rocks and sedimentary rocks. They are well exposed in Mount Serteng in Guyang granite-greenstone terrane. There are three sub-units in the greenstone sequence in this terrane. The lower layer is dominated by metamorphosed mafic and ultramafic volcanic rocks, with interlayered banded iron formation. The middle rock assemblage consists of a series of metamorphosed volcanic rocks with compositions varying from acidic to mafic. The top layer is made by meta-sedimentary rocks, for example quartzite and marble. According to the data of zircon dating, the bottom layer of the greenstone sequence formed in about 2.54 billion years ago, while the middle and upper layers have the age later than 2.51 billion years.

Granitoids are intrusive igneous rocks that primarily made by quartz, feldspars and micas. The granitoid rocks found in Guyang granite-greenstone terrane are mostly tonalite-trondhjemite-granodiorite (TTG) and sanukitoid. There were two phases forming TTGs, with the first stage at about 2.53 billion years ago and the second one at between 2.52-2.48 billion years ago. The sanukitoid in this terrane formed between the two phases of TTG formation, at about 2.53-2.52 billion years ago.

===== Wuchuan high-grade complex =====
Wuchuan high-grade complex extends from Zhulagou in the west to Xiwulanbulang in the east. The complex includes granitoids, granulites and charnockite. The granitoid rocks are predominantly medium (550-650 °C)- to high-grade (650-900 °C) metamorphosed diorite and the granulites are high-grade metamorphosed TTG rocks. Similar to Guyang granite-greenstone terrane, the rocks in Wuchuan have the age of 2.55-2.50 billion years. The high-grade complex is interpreted to be the metamorphosed lower crust in 2.55-2.50 billion years ago.

==== Proterozoic rocks (2500–539 million years ago) ====
Many researchers proposed that the Western Block of the North China Craton was assembled in the Paleoproterozoic (2.5-1.6 billion years ago), creating a linear structure composed of khondalite that cuts across the Western Block. The khondalite belt stretches from Helanshan in the west to Jining Complex in the east. Pelitic granulites, quartzite, felsic paragneiss and marble, which are the members of the "khondalite series", are exposed along this belt. The khondalite series is metamorphosed from sedimentary protoliths formed under stable continental margin condition. By zircon dating, the sedimentary protoliths were deposited at 2.3-2.0 billion years ago and then experienced metamorphism at 1.95-1.87 billion years ago. The minerals in the khondalite exhibit isothermal decompression-type clockwise P-T paths, implying the sedimentary protoliths were metamorphosed in a collisional setting.

=== Phanerozoic stratigraphy (539 million year ago–present) ===
The Western Block became much more stable after Precambrian. Sedimentary rocks were deposited, covering part of the Precambrian basement. There were also magmatism in Phanerozoic.
During Cambrian to Middle Ordovician, extensive carbonates were formed in the Western Block. Deposits were generally absent from Late Ordovician to Early Carboniferous. However, carbonates with some coal-bearing rocks started to deposit again between Late Carboniferous and Early Permian. In Late Permian, conglomerates as well as red iron-bearing sandstone, siltstone and mudstone (red beds) were formed. In Triassic and Jurassic, the stratigraphy was dominated by sandstone and mudstone. Sandstone deposition, together with magmatism happened in the Early Cretaceous, forming extrusive igneous rocks in the Western Block, for example rhyolite, andesite, basalt and dacite. From Late Cretaceous onwards, igneous rocks became minor. Late Cretaceous to Cenozoic sediments with Cenozoic basalt overlay the pre-existing strata.

Summary table of lithologies
Geological period	Time of rock formation^{[a]}	Lithologies	Location
Neoarchean	2.7 Ga	Tonalite-trondhjemite-granodiorite	Xiwulanbulang
Neoarchean	2.55–2.50 Ga	Greenschist, amphibolite, banded iron formation, hornblende-plagioclase gneiss, paragneiss, mica schist, quartzite, marble, tonalite-trondhjemite-granodiorite, quartz diorite, adakite, sanukitoids, granitoids, granulites and charnockite	Guyang granite–greenstone terrane and Wuchuan high-grade complex
Paleoproterozoic	1.95–1.87 Ga	Pelitic granulites, quartzite, felsic paragneiss and marble	Khondalite Belt
Cambrian	539–488 Ma	Carbonate rocks	Mainly in Ordos Basin
Ordovician	488–460 Ma	Carbonate rocks	Mainly in Ordos Basin
Ordovician	460–443 Ma	Generally absent	/
Silurian	443–416 Ma	Generally absent	/
Devonian	416–359 Ma	Generally absent	/
Carboniferous	359–318 Ma	Generally absent	/
Carboniferous	318–299 Ma	Carbonate rocks and coal-bearing rocks	Mainly in Ordos Basin
Permian	299–270 Ma	Carbonate rocks and coal-bearing rocks	Mainly in Ordos Basin
Permian	270–251 Ma	Red beds and conglomerates	Mainly in Ordos Basin
Triassic	251–228 Ma	Sand-bearing mudstone, medium- to fine-grained sandstone with grey mudstone layers	Mainly in Ordos Basin
Triassic	228–199 Ma	Fine-grained sandstone and mudstone with coal layers	Mainly in Ordos Basin
Jurassic	199–145 Ma	Medium- to fine-grained sandstones, siltstones, conglomerates, argillites and coal	Mainly in Ordos Basin
Cretaceous	145–65 Ma	Basalt, andesite, dacite, rhyolite and fossilized sedimentary rocks	Mainly in Ordos Basin
Cenozoic	65–present	Sediments and basalts	Mainly in Ordos Basin

== Tectonic subdivision ==
The tectonic subdivision of the Western Block is still under intense discussion among geologists. There are several models illustrating the tectonic subdivision of the Western Block and these models assign different names to the components and structures of the Western Blocks. The shapes and areas of Western Block in these models are similar but they may not completely concordant with each other.

Zhao and his colleagues proposed that the Western Block of the North China Craton can be subdivided into two sub-blocks: Yinshan Block and Ordos Block. In between the sub-blocks is a Paleoproterozoic continent–continent collisional belt defined as Khondalite Belt. The Khondalite Belt extends across the whole block in east-northeast (ENE) and west-southwest (WSW) direction.

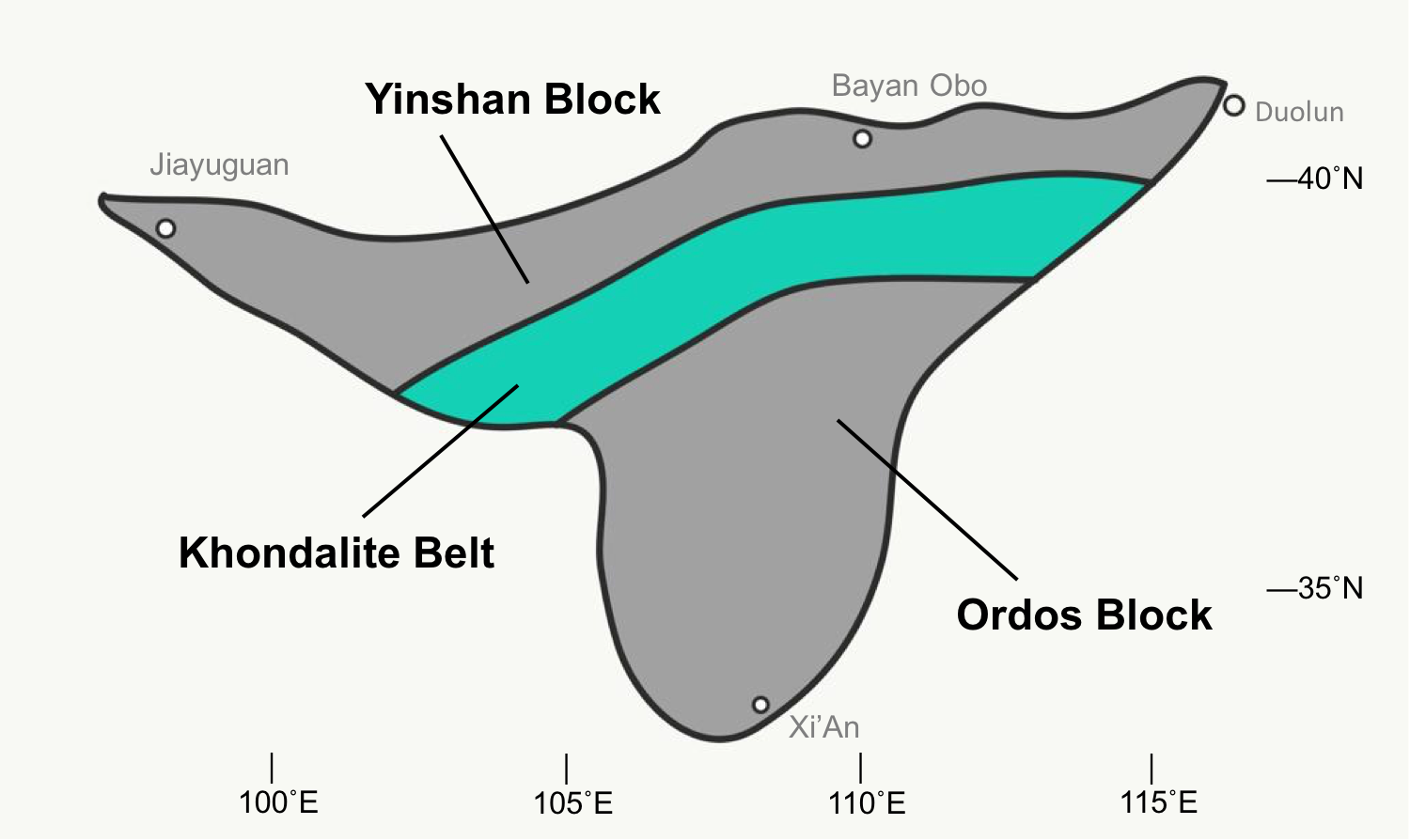
Fig. 3a. Tectonic subdivision of the Western Block of North China Craton in Zhao et al's model.

Kusky and his co-workers divided the Western Block into three elements, including the Inner Mongolia-Northern Hebei Orogen, Hengshan Plateau and a micro-continental block. The southern boundary of the Hengshan Plateau is marked by the normal faults, which have a general trend of east-northeast (ENE) and west-southwest (WSW) direction. There is a northeast-southwest trending fault called Datong-Wuqi Fault, cutting across the Western Block.

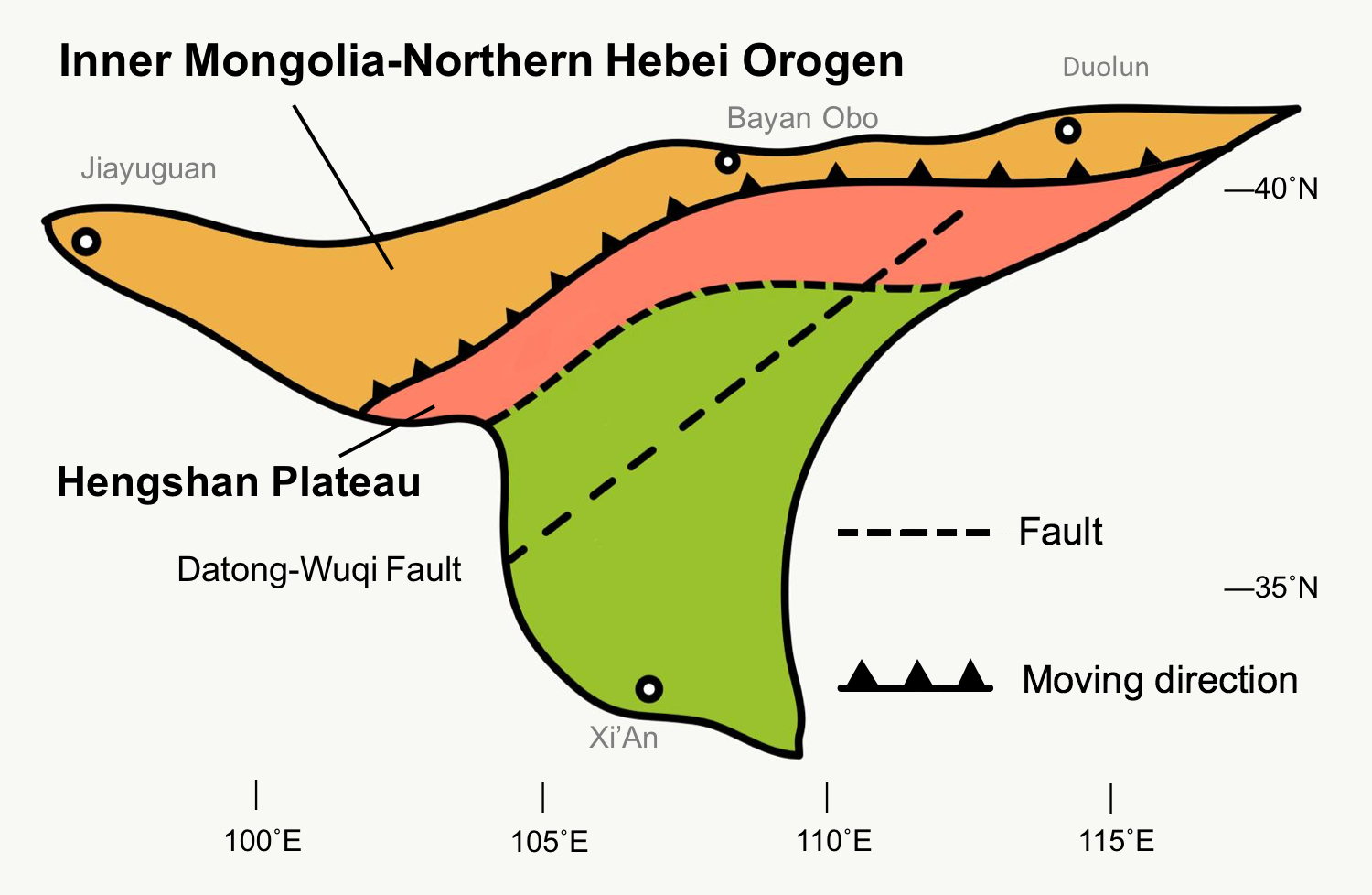
Fig. 3b. Tectonic subdivision of the Western Block of North China Craton in Kusky et al's model. The triangles indicate that the Hengshan Plateau moves northwards, towards the Inner Mongolia-Northern Hebei Orogen. Dotted lines show faults.

Similar to Zhao et al.'s model, Santosh split the Western Block into Yinshan Block and Ordos Block in the north and south respectively. However, instead of Khondalite Belt, he named the collision region of the two sub-blocks Inner Mongolia Suture Zone. Discontinuous Khondalite Belt exposures lie inside south of the Inner Mongolia Suture Zone.

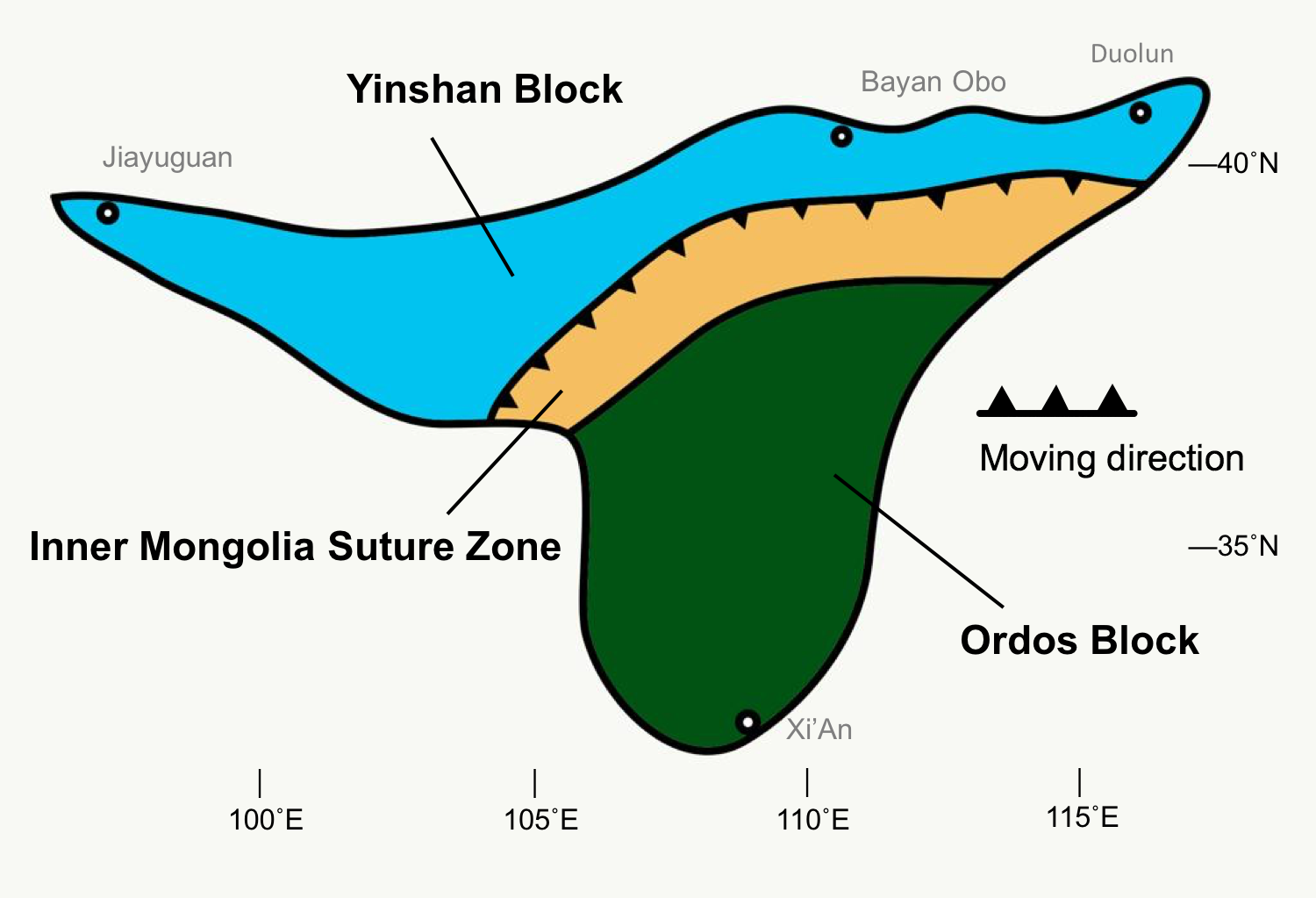
Fig. 3c. Tectonic subdivision of the Western Block of North China Craton in Santosh's model. The triangles show that Yinshan Block moves southwards.

== Tectonic evolution ==
=== Precambrian history ===
There are various evolutionary models of the Western Block proposed by different geologists. Three most popular models explaining the tectonic evolution of the Precambrian basement are discussed below.

==== Zhao et al's model ====
Zhao et al.'s model can be divided into two major stages: Neoarchean crustal accretion and Paleoproterozoic amalgamation of the two sub-blocks (Yinshan Block and Orods Block). Zhao and other researchers proposed that there was a major crustal accretion of the juvenile Yinshan Block at about 2.7 billion years ago, forming a thick mafic crust, although it is still uncertain whether the magmatic event occurred in a continental or an oceanic setting. During 2.55-2.50 billion years ago, the juvenile Yinshan Block was partially melted to produce enormous amounts of TTG rocks, covering the whole Yinshan Block. At about 2.45 billion years ago, Ordos Block was subducted beneath the Yinshan Block. The partial melting of the subducting slab formed granites and volcanic rocks like adakites and sanukitoids. Between 2.0-1.95 billion year ago, sedimentary rocks deposited on the stable passive margins of continent in the northern Ordos Block. The final assembly of the Western Block took place at approximately 1.95 billion years ago. The ancient ocean closed as the continents of southern Yinshan Block and northern Ordos Block collided. The high pressure and temperature of continent-continent collision formed Khondalite Belt in-between the two sub-blocks and led to metamorphism in other parts of the Western Block.

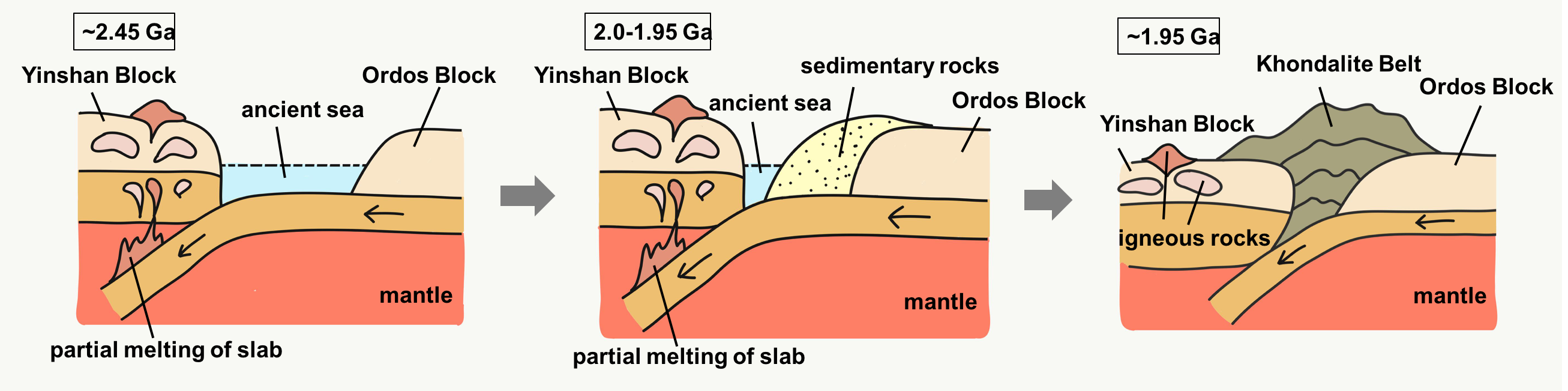
Fig. 4. A tectonic evolution diagram from 2.45 Ga to 1.95 Ga^{[a]}, proposed by Zhao et al. (1) At around 2.45 Ga, the oceanic crust of Ordos Block was subducted beneath Yinshan Block, making igneous rocks. (2) Sedimentary rocks deposited in Ordos Block between 2.0-1.95 Ga. (3) Both continents of Yinshan Block and Ordos Block met at around 1.95 Ga and an orogenic belt called Khondalite Belt was formed between the two sub-blocks.

==== Kusky et al's model ====
In Kusky et al.'s model, ancient continental blocks formed the juvenile Western Block during 3.5-2.7 billion years ago. Prior to 2.3 billion years ago, Wutai Arc was subducted under the eastern part of the juvenile Western Block, while an exotic arc was subducted under the eastern juvenile Western Block. Between 2.3-2.0 billion year ago, the Western Block collided with the two arc on its both sides, creating Hengshan granulite belt in the southeast and Inner Mongolia-Northern Hebei Orogen with khondalite belt inside in the northwest. Finally, supercontinent Columbia collided in the northern margin of the North China Craton at 1.8 billion years ago.

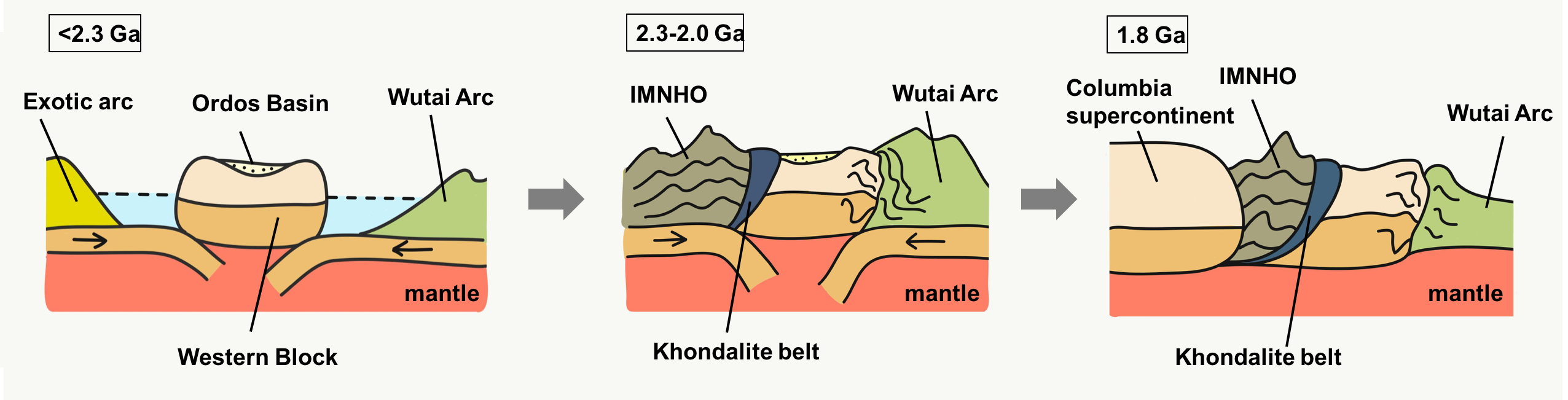
Fig. 5. Tectonic evolution of the Western Block proposed by Kusky et al. (1) Wutai Arc in the east and an Exotic arc in the west subducted beneath the juvenile Western Block before 2.3 Ga^{[a]}. (2) Inner Mongolia-North Hebei Orogen formed as the exotic arc collided with the juvenile Western Block. (3) Supercontinent Columbia collided with the Western Block. IMNHO-Inner Mongolia-North Hebei Orogen.

==== Santosh's model ====
Unlike the Zhao's and Kusky's models, the tectonic evolution of the Western Block suggested by Santosh primarily focused on the amalgamation of the Western Block, with fewer discussion on the early tectonic development before collisional events. Santosh considered the Ordos Block as a continental arc composed by TTGs and charnockites. Supported by zircon dating and tomographic data, Santosh proposed that the Yinshan Block and Ordos Block collided at around 1.92 billion years ago, with Yinshan Block subducted under Ordos Block. An accretionary wedge was formed when the two sub-blocks collided. Part of the basaltic oceanic crust was incorporated into the accretionary wedge. Santosh named the accretionary wedge region as Inner Mongolia Suture Zone. Khondalite belt was also formed in the suture zone.

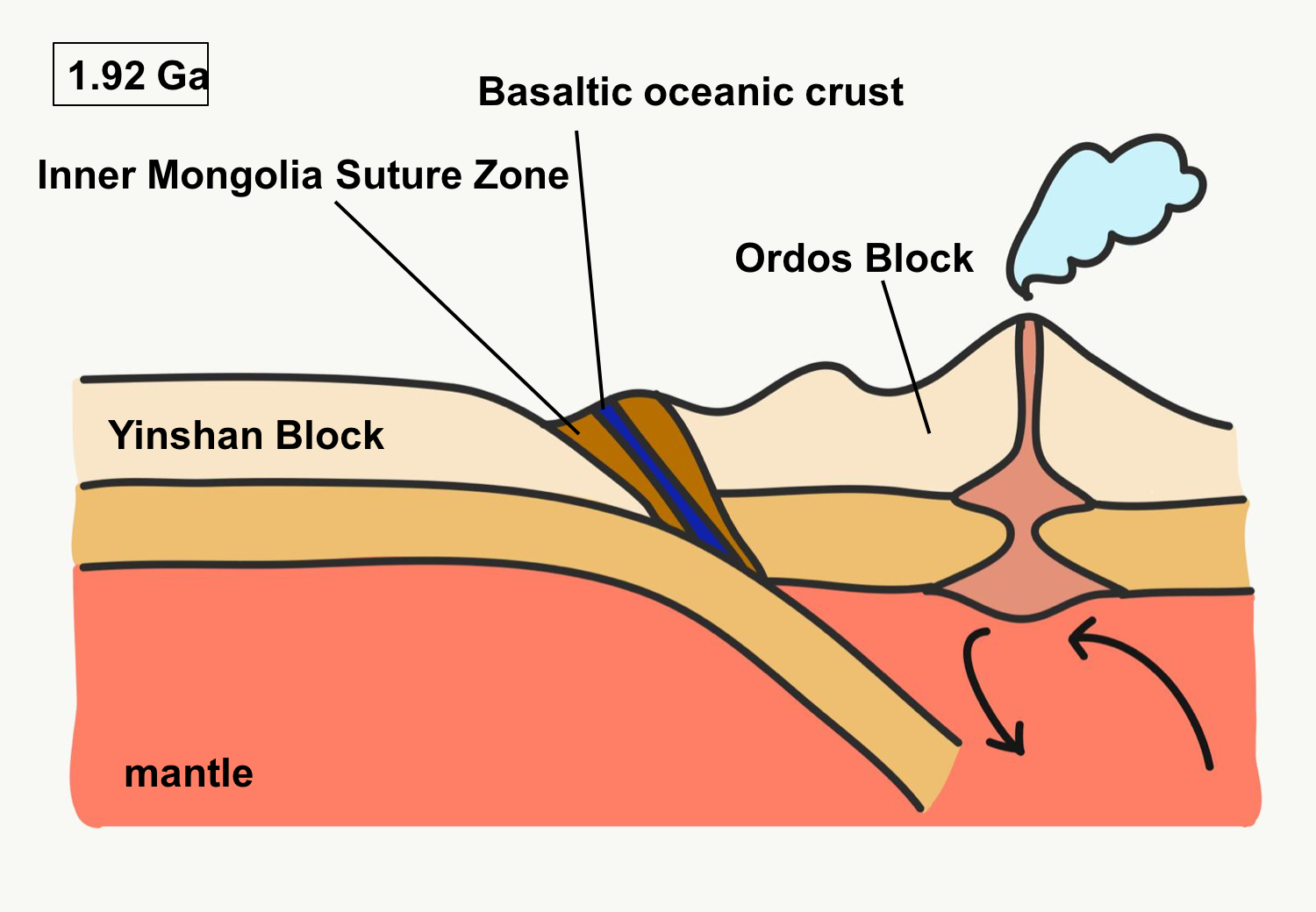
Fig. 6. Tectonic evolution of the Western Block proposed by Santosh. Yinshan Block was subducted under Ordos Block at 1.92 Ga^{[a]}, forming Inner Mongolia Suture Zone with some basaltic oceanic crust in between.

=== Phanerozoic history ===
The Western Block became tectonically stable after the amalgamation in Precambrian. Sediment deposition and volcanic activities began to form rocks covering the Precambrian basement. Except a gap of geological record during Late Ordovician to Early Carboniferous, from Cambrian to Jurassic, various types of sedimentary rock formed a thick strata.

In Early Cretaceous, extensive magmatic activities developed in the eastern part of the Western Block due to cratonic destruction. At that time, a large portion of the North China Craton was eliminated and unstable. The cratonic destruction was induced by the subduction of the Pacific Plate beneath the Asian continent, followed by crust thickening and hence gravitational collapse of the crust. The craton was thus in extension. The processes led to the thinning of crust, deformation and magmatic events over the North China Craton. Although most of the magmatic activities happened in the Eastern Block, volcanic eruption also took place in the eastern part of the Western Block to produce volcanic rocks like basalt, andesite, dacite and rhyolite. During Cenozoic, because of the thin crust, lava erupted to the surface and the volcanic events produced basalts.

== See also ==
- North China Craton
- Eastern Block of North China Craton
- Geology of China
- Khondalite
- Greenstone Belt
- Archean subduction

== Notes ==
a.Ga refers to billion years ago; Ma refers to million years ago.
