= Exhumation (geology) =

Geological rock movement process

In geology, exhumation is the process by which a parcel of buried rock approaches Earth's surface.

It differs from the related ideas of rock uplift and surface uplift in that it is explicitly measured relative to the surface of the Earth, rather than with reference to some absolute reference frame, such as the Earth's geoid.

Exhumation of buried rocks should be considered as two different categories namely, exhumation by denudation/erosion or exhumation by tectonic processes followed by erosion. In the latter case, rocks (or rock packages) from deeper crustal levels (meter to kilometer depths below the Earth's surface) are brought towards the Earth's surface (i.e.shallower crustal levels) by crustal thickening (see compared also tectonic uplift) and/or extensional tectonics and are subsequently exposed by erosion. Often exhumation involves a complex interaction between crustal thickening, extensional tectonics and erosion.

Notably, there are overlapping characteristics between the different modes of burial and exhumation and distinction and between them relies on a series of parameters such as:

- The spatial and temporal distribution of the finite strain pattern
- The metamorphic field gradient
- The spatial distribution of cooling ages (see for example radiometric dating of hornblende)
- The spatial distribution of metamorphic pressure-temperature-time (P-T-t) paths

Detailed and integrated geologic modelling, structural geology, geochronology and metamorphic geological disciplines are key to understanding these processes.

== Denudation ==
Exhumation through denudation could be considered as the process of exposing rock packages solely through the removal of their overlying unconsolidated sediments or solid rock layers. Denudation is here considered as a process that removes parts of the Earth's upper crust by physical processes that occur naturally (e.g. glaciers, wind, water, landslides). Through this form of exhumation, something previously buried in sediments, for example a landform, is uncovered and can be exposed.

== Exhumation by tectonic processes ==
Exhumation by tectonic processes refers to any geological mechanism that brings rocks from deeper crustal levels to shallower crustal levels. While erosion or denudation is fundamental in eventually exposing these deeper rocks at the Earth's surface, the geological phenomenon that drive the rocks to shallower crust are still considered exhumation processes. Geological exhumation occurs on a range of scales, from smaller-scale thrusts typically occurring within the shallow crust (less than ca. 10 km deep) which results in exhumation in the order of centimeters to meters scales, to larger-scale features originating at deeper crustal levels along which, exhumation is in the order of hundreds of meters to kilometers.

The geological mechanisms that drive deep crustal exhumation can occur in a variety of tectonic settings but are ultimately driven by the convergence of tectonic plates through subduction. Depending on the type of convergent boundary, exhumation occurs by thrusting in the accretionary wedge, by obduction and/or as a process during the orogenic cycle (i.e. mountain building and collapse cycle).

=== Obduction ===
During the subduction of an oceanic plate underneath the continental crust, some fragments of the oceanic crust can be trapped above the continental crust through obduction. The resulting rocks obducted on the continental crust are called ophiolites. While the exact mechanism behind the formation of ophiolites is still up for debate, those rocks still show an example of rocks being exhumed and exposed at the surface by the tectonic process of obduction and then exposed.

=== Exhumation of the deep crust during an orogenic cycle. ===
Exhumation of deep crustal rocks during an orogenic cycle occurs mainly during continental collision or during post-collision extension and is thus, is broadly grouped into the three mechanisms which are used to describe the burial and exhumation of the cycle namely, syn-convergent orogenic wedges, channel flow (also known as ductile extrusion) and post-convergence gravitational collapse.

==== Syn-convergent orogenic wedge ====
During the subduction to the collisional phases of the orogenic cycle, a tectonic wedge forms on the prowedge (side of the subducting plate) and commonly the retrowedge (continental side) of the orogen. During the continued convergence, the wedge maintains its shape by maintaining its critical angle of taper by the interaction of thickening through basal accretion or foreland propagation (frontal accretion) and thinning through normal faulting and erosion at the upper part of the wedge. Erosion of the wedge significantly impacts the dynamics within the wedge, which promotes exhumation by thrusting mid-crustal rocks to the hanging wall of the wedge. Characteristics of this mode of exhumation include, evidence for strong non coaxial reverse-shearing, pro-grade metamorphism, cooling ages are progressively younger towards deeper structural levels and that exhumation at higher structural levels is coeval to burial of the structural levels. Tectonics of this kind result in fold and thrust belts or if they are built up over long periods, can form thick-stacked long-hot-orogens, such as the Himalayas.

==== Channel-flow ====
Channel flow typically occurs in long-hot orogens when the orogen is sufficiently thick to promote partial melting in the middle-lower part of the orogen to a point where the rocks reach a critically low viscosity enabling them to flow. Subsequently these rocks can decoupled from their base and begin to flow to higher crustal levels along lithostatic pressure gradients that can be caused by melt-induced buoyancy or differences in topography and lateral density contrasts. both of which are affected by erosion. Characteristics of this mode of exhumation include simultaneous normal shearing and reverse shearing along the roof and the base of the channel respectively, high-temperature retrograde metamorphic assemblages, cooing ages should be younger to the front of the channel and P-T-t paths suggesting prolonged burial and synchronous exhumation throughout the channel.

==== Post-convergent gravitational collapse ====
Post-convergent gravitational collapse (extension) occurs once the convergence forces can no longer support the gravitational force of the orogen that was built up during collision. During collapse, high-grade rocks from the core of the orogen are exhumed through upward flow towards now thinned crustal areas forming domal shaped metamorphic core complexes. Alternatively, or in conjunction with the extension of the center of the orogen, propagation of the rock-mass towards the margin may lead to exhumation along a series of brittle or ductile thrusts and normal faults and ultimately the formation of fold and thrust type belts along the margins of the collapsed orogen. Characteristics of gravitational collapse include outward verging, normal sense shear zones along the margins of the core complexes and exhumation-only type P-T-t paths.
