= Pressure-temperature-time path =

Graphical representation of the pressure-temperature history of a metamorphic rock

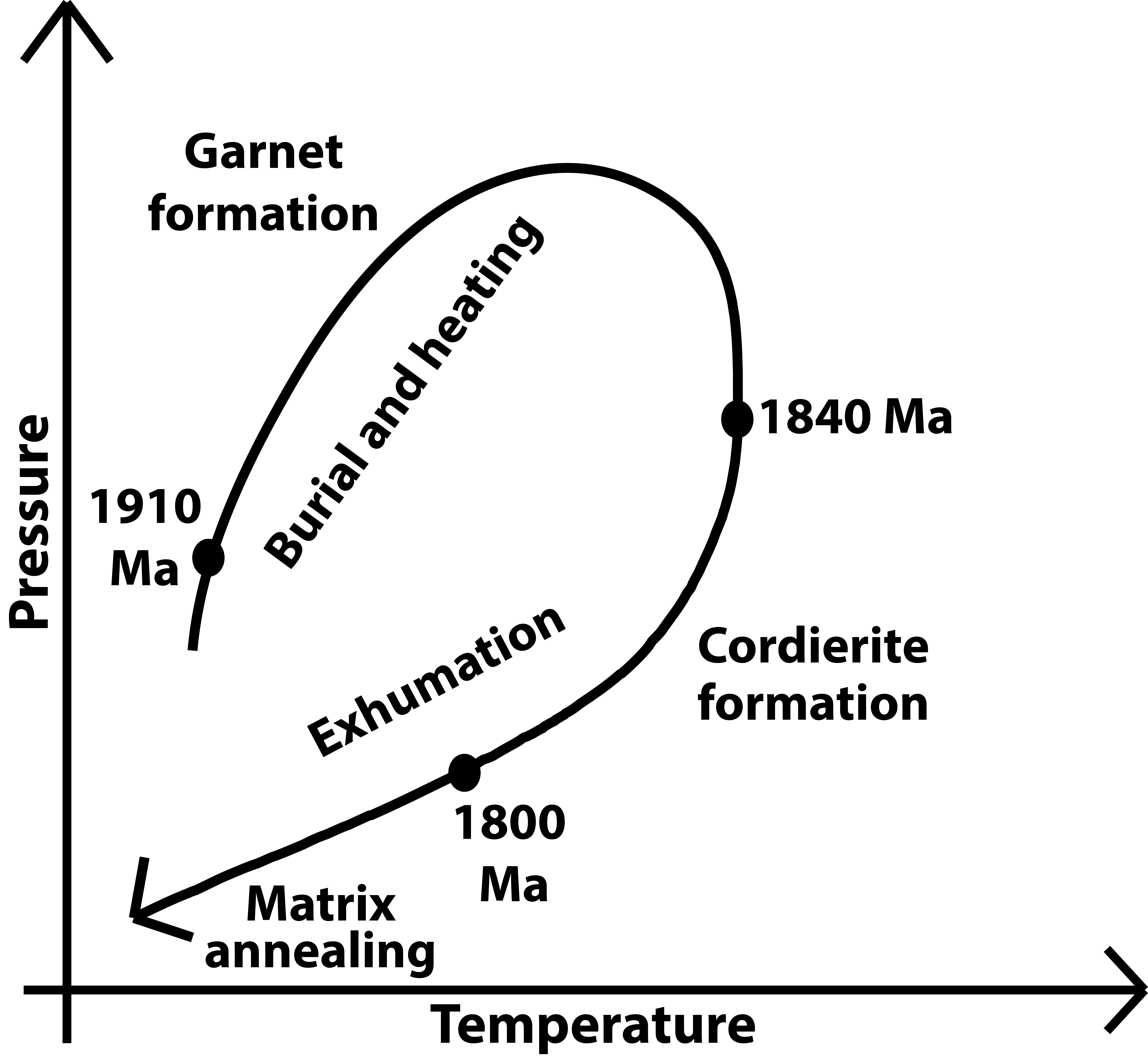
A schematic clockwise P-T-t path. Metamorphic minerals alter with the changing P-T condition with time without reaching complete phase equilibrium, making P-T-t path tracking possible. From 1910 Ma (i.e. 1910 million years ago) to 1840 Ma, the rock experienced an increase in P-T conditions and formed mineral garnet, which is attributed to burial and heating. After that, the rock was continuously heated to the peak temperature and formed mineral cordierite. Meanwhile, it went through a great decrease in pressure around 1840 Ma due to an uplift event. Finally, the continuous drop in pressure and temperature in 1800 Ma resulted from further erosion and exhumation. The peak pressure is found to be reached before the peak temperature, owing to the relatively poor thermal conductivity of the rock upon increasing P-T condition, while the rock instantaneously experienced the pressure changes. Garnet and cordierite do not reach complete equilibrium when discovered on the surface, leaving a print of the past P-T environments.

The Pressure-Temperature-time path (P-T-t path) is a record of the pressure and temperature (P-T) conditions that a rock experienced in a metamorphic cycle from burial and heating to uplift and exhumation to the surface. Metamorphism is a dynamic process which involves the changes in minerals and textures of the pre-existing rocks (protoliths) under different P-T conditions in solid state. The changes in pressures and temperatures with time experienced by the metamorphic rocks are often investigated by petrological methods, radiometric dating techniques and thermodynamic modeling.

Metamorphic minerals are unstable upon changing P-T conditions. The original minerals are commonly destroyed during solid state metamorphism and react to grow into new minerals that are relatively stable. Water is generally involved in the reaction, either from the surroundings or generated by the reaction itself. Usually, a large amount of fluids (e.g. water vapor, gas etc.) escape under increasing P-T conditions e.g. burial. When the rock is later uplifted, due to the escape of fluids at an earlier stage, there is not enough fluids to permit all the new minerals to react back into the original minerals. Hence, the minerals are not fully in equilibrium when discovered on the surface. Therefore, the mineral assemblages in metamorphic rocks implicitly record the past P-T conditions that the rock has experienced, and investigating these minerals can supply information about the past metamorphic and tectonic history.

The P-T-t paths are generally classified into two types: clockwise P-T-t paths, which are related to collision origin, and involve high pressures followed by high temperatures; and anticlockwise P-T-t paths, which are usually of intrusion origin, and involve high temperatures before high pressures. (The "clockwise" and "anticlockwise" names refer to the apparent direction of the paths in the Cartesian space, where the x-axis is temperature, and the y-axis is pressure.)

== Stages in P-T-t paths ==
P-T-t paths often reflect various stages of the metamorphic cycle. A metamorphic cycle implies the series of processes that a rock experienced from burial, heating to uplift and erosion. The P-T conditions experienced by a rock throughout these processes can be classified into three main stages according to temperature changes:

1. Prograde (pre-peak) metamorphism: the process when the rock is buried and heated in environments such as basins or subduction zones. Devolatilization reactions (release of gases e.g_{.} CO_{2}, H_{2}O) are common.
2. Peak metamorphism: the maximum temperature reached throughout the metamorphic history.
3. Retrograde (post-peak) metamorphism: the metamorphism occurred during uplift and cooling of the rock.

However, retrograde metamorphism may not always be observed in metamorphic rocks. This is due to the loss of fluids (e.g. CO_{2}, H_{2}O) from prograde metamorphism, after which there is insufficient fluid to permit reverse reaction of the mineral assemblages. Another reason is that the rocks are of inappropriate composition to generate all the minerals that record their complete metamorphic events. On average, only one-in-twenty metamorphic rock samples display all the three stages of metamorphism.

== P-T-t path trajectories ==
P-T-t paths can generally be classified into two types: clockwise P-T-t paths and anticlockwise P-T-t paths.

=== Clockwise P-T-t paths ===
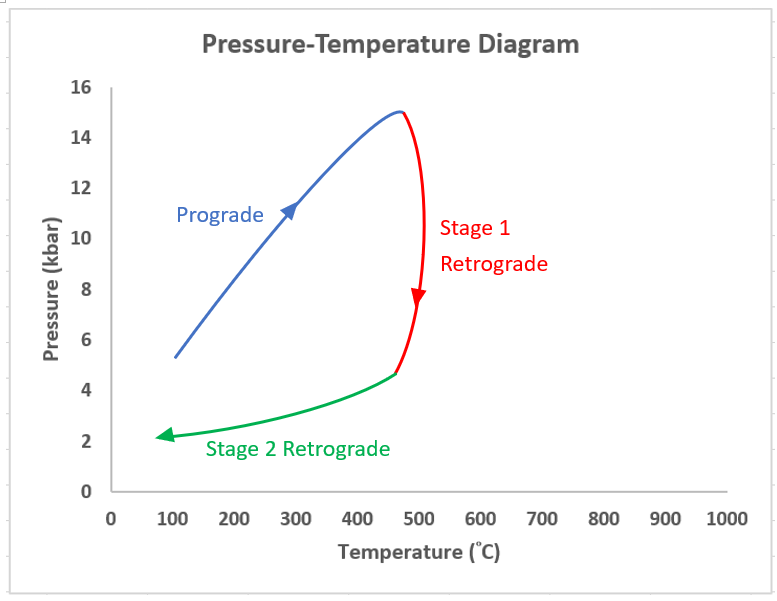
A typical clockwise P-T-t path (ideal case).

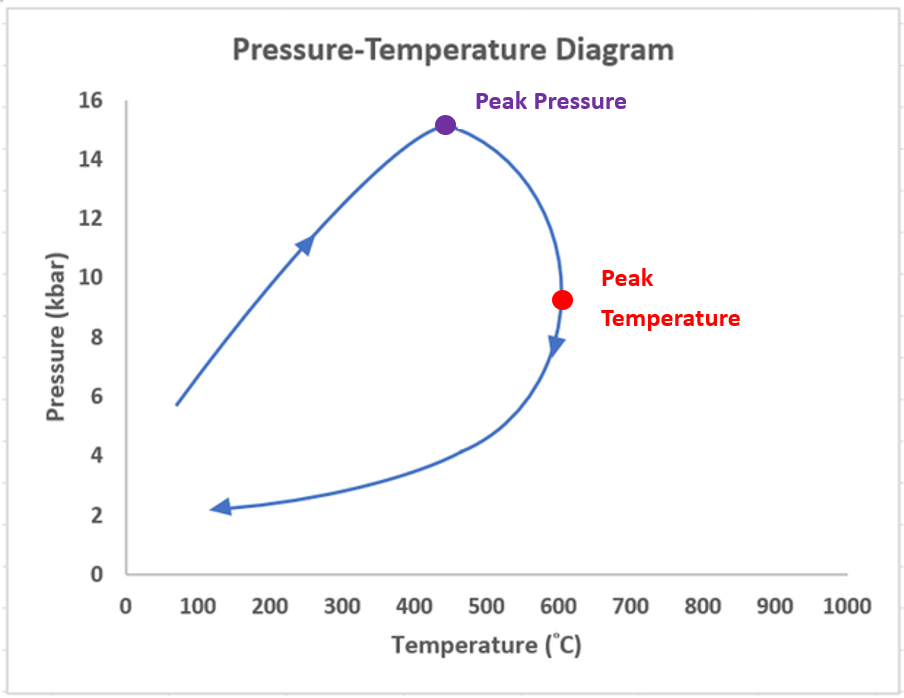
A common clockwise P-T-t path observed in reality.

Metamorphic rocks with clockwise P-T-t paths are commonly associated with a near-isothermal decompressional P-T trajectory.

Clockwise P-T-t path normally consists of three parts:

1. Initial heating and compression until arriving a peak, a high pressure-low temperature peak is often observed. (Prograde metamorphism until peak)
2. Near-isothermal decompression after the peak (Stage 1 retrograde metamorphism)
3. Further decompression and cooling at a slow rate (Stage 2 retrograde metamorphism)

One might expect that the rock reaches its peak metamorphism at the peak temperature and pressure at similar time, and near-isothermal decompression P-T-t path is observed at its stage 1 metamorphism. However, in reality, the rocks commonly experience the peak pressure prior to the peak temperature. This is due to the relative insensitivity of rocks to thermal events, i.e. poor conductivity of rock upon external thermal changes, whereas the rocks instantaneously experience pressure changes.

Examples of metamorphic rocks that consist of clockwise P-T-t paths can be found at:

- Trans-North China orogen, North China Craton
- Bohemian Massif, Austria
- Southern Brittany, France
- Northern Gallatin Range, South-western Montana, USA
- Southern Prince Charles Mountains, East Antarctica

=== Anticlockwise P-T-t paths ===
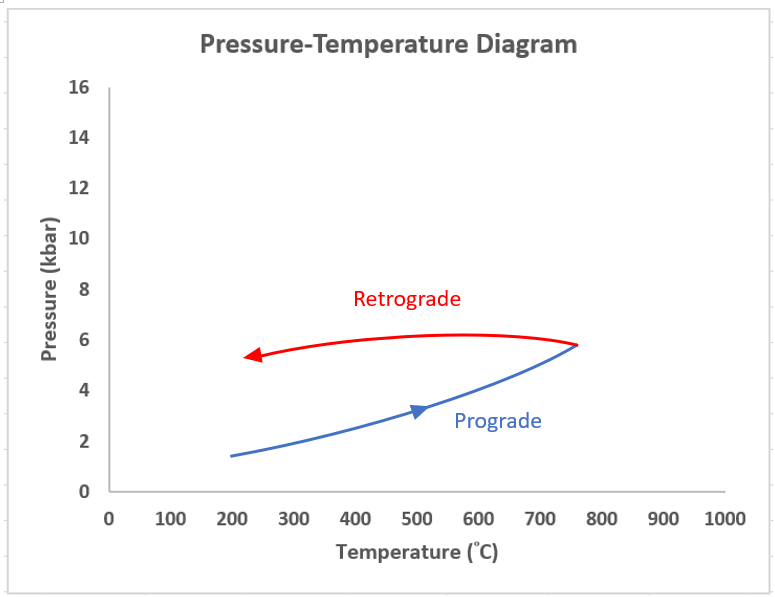
A common anticlockwise P-T-t path.

Metamorphic rocks with anticlockwise P-T-t paths are commonly associated with a near-isobaric cooling P-T trajectory.

Anticlockwise P-T-t path normally consists of two parts:

1. Initial heating and compression until reaching a peak, a low pressure-high temperature peak is often observed. (Prograde metamorphism until peak)
2. Near-isobaric cooling after the peak (Retrograde metamorphism)

It is commonly observed that the peak temperature is reached prior to the peak pressure in anticlockwise P-T-t paths, as the rocks usually experienced the heat from the heat source before being extensively pressurized.

Examples of metamorphic rocks that consist of anticlockwise P-T-t paths can be found at:

- Arunta Block, Central Australia
- Andes, South America
- Yinshan Block, North China Craton
- Coastal Cordillera, South-Central Chile

== Reconstruction of P-T-t paths ==
The reconstruction of P-T-t paths includes two types of approaches:

1. Backward approach: the method of inversely inferring the metamorphic events from rock samples via traditional petrological investigation methods (e.g. optical microscopy, geothermobarometry etc.).
2. Forward approach: using thermal modeling techniques to work on the geological evolutionary model of rocks, and is usually used to validate results obtained in the backward approach.

=== Backward approach (Petrological P-T-t reconstruction) ===
Petrological reconstruction is a backward approach which utilizes mineral compositions of rocks samples to deduce the possible P-T conditions. Common techniques include optical microscopy, geothermobarometry, pseudosections, and geochronology.

==== Optical microscopy ====
In qualitative reconstruction of P-T conditions, geologists examine thin sections under polarized light microscope to determine the sequence of formation of the minerals. Due to incomplete replacement of the earlier formed minerals under changing P-T conditions, minerals formed at various P-T environments can be found in the same rock specimen. As different minerals have different optical characteristics and textures, determination of the mineral compositions in metamorphic rocks is made possible.

Common textures at different stages of metamorphism:

- Prograde (pre-peak) metamorphism
  - Mineral inclusions (poikiloblastic texture): a mineral that is formed at a lower P-T condition is included in another mineral that is formed at a higher P-T condition. For example, in thin section examination, biotite crystal is included in a garnet grain, so biotite is considered to be formed at an earlier time.
- Peak metamorphism
  - Porphyroblastic-matrix texture: large euhedral crystals inside a fine groundmass. Both the euhedral crystals and the matrix minerals of the porphyroblasts are formed at peak metamorphism.
- Retrograde (post-peak) metamorphism
  - Corona (reaction rim): minerals formed at lower P-T conditions surrounding the higher grade mineral
  - Symplectite (finger-like texture): intergrowth between retrograde minerals (formed at lower P-T conditions) and minerals formed at the peak stage (higher P-T conditions)
  - Mineral cross-cutting: retrograde minerals cross-cut minerals that are formed at the peak stage

Textures at different stages of metamorphism observed under a microscope
Stages of metamorphism	Typical texture	Example of texture
Prograde (Pre-peak)	mineral inclusions	Microcline (cross-hatched twinning) included in magnetite (black, opaque) in plagioclase (polysynthetic twinning). Therefore, the sequence of formation is: microcline → magnetite → plagioclase.
Peak	porphyroblasts	A garnet-mica schist with porphyroblastic garnet (black) in fine-grained mica matrix
Retrograde (Post-peak)	reaction rims	A reaction rim (light grey area) is formed around the host mineral (dark grey) when the temperature and pressure decrease.
Retrograde (Post-peak)	symplectites	Intergrowth of fayalite-pyroxene symplectite (grey) against apatite (white) exhibits a symplectitic texture on the right.
Retrograde (Post-peak)	cross-cutting	Light-colored serpentine veins cross-cut dark-colored mafic minerals, thus serpentine veins should be formed later than the dark minerals.

Not all rock samples exhibit all the P-T conditions they experienced throughout geological evolution. This is attributed to the complexity of the geological processes, which the samples may have undergone complicated thermodynamic histories, or of inappropriate mineral compositions to produce minerals that record their metamorphic events.

==== Geothermobarometry ====
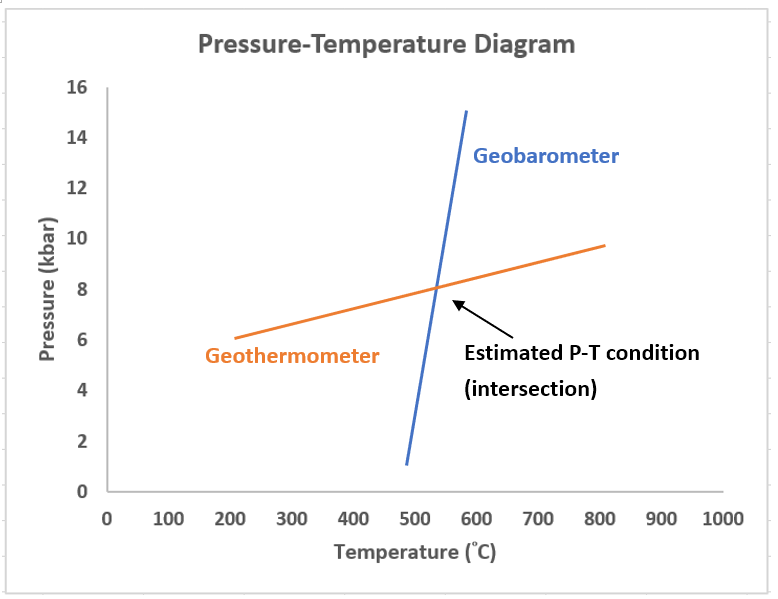
An illustration of geothermobarometry. A line of temperature equilibrium (orange) and a line of pressure equilibrium (blue) of selected mineral assemblages found in the specimen are plotted on the P-T diagram. The intersection represents the likely P-T condition experienced by rock in its metamorphic history.

Geothermobarometry is a quantitative measurement of the P-T conditions, which is widely used in analyzing the P-T conditions of metamorphic and intrusive igneous rocks.

The underlying principle of geothermobarometry is by utilizing the equilibrium constants of mineral assemblages in a rock to infer the metamorphic P-T conditions. An electron microprobe is usually used in geothermobarometry to measure the distribution of components in the minerals and give precise determination of the chemical equilibrium within the specimen.

Geothermobarometry is a combination of:

- Geothermometry: the measurement of temperature changes using equilibrium of minerals that are insensitive to pressure variations, and
- Geobarometry: the determination of the pressure changes using equilibrium of minerals that are of little dependence on temperature change.

Geothermometers are usually represented by exchange reactions, which are sensitive to temperature but with little effect under changing pressure, such as exchange of Fe^{2+} and Mg^{2+} between garnet-biotite reaction:

$$\mathsf{\underbrace\ce{ Fe3Al2Si3O12 }_{\text{Fe-Al garnet}}+\underbrace\ce{KMg3AlSi3O10(OH)2}_{\text{Mg-rich biotite}} \ \ce{<=>}\ \underbrace\ce{Mg3Al2Si3O12}_{\text{Mg-Al garnet}}+\underbrace\ce{KFe3AlSi3O10(OH)2}_{\text{Fe-rich biotite}}}$$

Geobarometers are typically occurred as net-transfer reactions, which are sensitive to pressure but have little change with temperature, such as garnet-plagioclase-muscovite-biotite reaction that involves a significant volume reduction upon high pressure:

$$\mathsf{\underbrace\ce{ Fe3Al2Si3O12 }_{\text{Fe-Al garnet}}+\underbrace\ce{Ca3Al2Si3O12}_{\text{Ca-Al garnet}}+\underbrace\ce{KAl3Si3O10(OH)2}_{\text{muscovite}}\ \ce{<=>} \ \underbrace\ce{3CaAl2Si2O8}_{\text{plagioclase}}+\underbrace\ce{KFe3AlSi3O10(OH)2}_{\text{biotite}}}$$

Since mineral assemblages at equilibrium are dependent on pressures and temperatures, by measuring the composition of the coexisting minerals, together with using suitable activity models, the P-T conditions experienced by the rock can be determined.

After one equilibrium constant is found, a line would be plotted on the P-T diagram. As different equilibrium constants of mineral assemblages would occur as lines with different slopes in the P-T diagram, therefore, by finding the intersection of at least two lines in the P-T diagram, the P-T condition of the specimen can be obtained.

Despite the usefulness of geothermobarometry, special attention should be paid to whether the mineral assemblages represent an equilibrium, any occurrence of retrograde equilibrium in the rock, and appropriateness of calibration of the results.

===== Garnet growth zoning =====
Garnet zones grow from core to rim. Each concentric garnet zone displays different chemical compositions, indicating different P-T conditions.

Investigating the compositions in each garnet zone can supply information about the different P-T points as well as the trend of the P-T path.

Garnet growth zoning is a special type of geothermobarometry that focuses on the composition variations in garnet.

Zoning is a texture in solid-solution minerals which the minerals form concentric rings from core to rim upon changing P-T conditions. In a changing environment, minerals would be unstable and alter itself to reduce its Gibbs free energy to achieve stable states. However, sometimes the mineral core has not reached equilibrium upon the environmental change and zoning occurs. Zoning is also found in other minerals such as plagioclase and fluorite.

In practice, garnet is commonly used in the study of metamorphic rocks due to its refractory nature. In past studies, garnet is found to be a mineral that is stable under a wide range of P-T conditions, meanwhile chemically displays responses (e.g. ions exchange) to the P-T variations throughout its metamorphic history without reaching complete equilibrium. The non-equilibriated garnet formed previously are often zoned by younger garnet. Therefore, many past P-T characteristics are preserved in the zoned areas. Electron microprobes are used to measure the composition of the garnet zones.

However, melting within garnet sometimes occurs or diffusion rate is too rapid at high temperature, some garnet zones are merged and cannot provide sufficient information about the complete metamorphic history of the rocks.

====== Gibbs method ======
The Gibbs method formalism is a method used to analyze pressures and temperatures of zoned minerals and textural changes in metamorphic rocks by applying differential thermodynamic equations based on Duhem's Theorem. It attempts to simulate the garnet growth zoning numerically by solving a set of differential equations involving variables pressure (P), temperature (T), chemical potential (μ), mineral composition (X). Modal abundance of mineral phases (M) was later added as an extensive variable in the Gibbs method with mass balance added as a constraint. The aim of this analysis is to search for the absolute P-T condition during different zonal growth and matches the observed composition of zones in the sample. The computer program GIBBS is commonly used for calculation of the equations.

==== Pseudosection ====
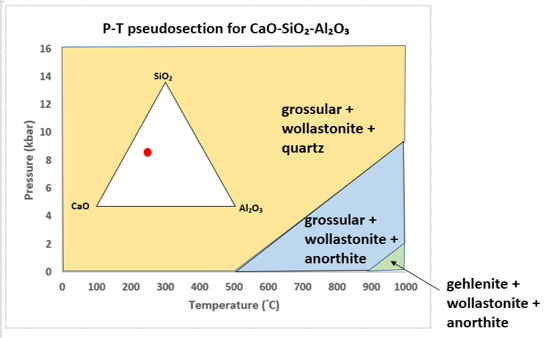
An example of a pseudosection. The above shows the areas of stable mineral assemblages at different P-T ranges for a single bulk-rock composition (red dot) of the CaO-SiO_{2}-Al_{2}O_{3} rock composition ternary diagram (white triangle).

Pseudosection is an equilibrium phase diagram which shows all the stable mineral assemblages of a rock at different P-T ranges for a single whole-rock chemical composition (bulk-rock composition). The stable mineral assemblages are marked as different areas in the P-T graph.

Unlike geothermobarometry, which focuses only on single chemical equilibrium equations, pseudosections make use of multiple equilibrium equations to search for the past P-T conditions. It is widely used in metamorphic rock analysis due to its consideration of multiple reactions which resemble metamorphic processes of multiple minerals in reality.

(Pseudosection is different from petrogenetic grid. Pseudosection shows different mineral phases for a single rock chemical composition, while petrogenetic grid shows a set of reactions under different P-T conditions that would occur for a phase diagram.)

In the construction of pseudosections, the bulk-rock composition is firstly determined using geochemical techniques, then inserted into computer programs for calculations based on thermodynamics equations to generate pseudosection diagrams.

There are two geochemical methods in determining the bulk-rock composition:

1. X-ray fluorescence (XRF) analysis, which directly determines the whole rock chemical composition.
2. Point-counting composition using an electron microprobe, which involves weighted calculation of minerals in rocks observed from thin-sections.

Both methods have their advantages and limitations. The XRF method provides a non-biased estimation, but may neglect the proportion of existing minerals in the rock. Meanwhile, the point-counting method takes into account of mineral proportions, but is based on human judgement and may be biased.

Common computer programs for computing pseudosections:

- THERMOCALC
- GIBBS
- TWQ
- THERIAK-DOMINO
- PERPLE_X

The results from a single pseudosection is not completely reliable, since in reality the rock specimen is not always in equilibrium. However, analysis can be done on fractions of the P-T-t path e.g. at boundaries of mineral inclusions, or on local bulk composition analysis would improve precision and accuracy of the P-T-t path.

==== Geochronology ====
To figure out the age of the metamorphic events, geochronological techniques are used. It utilizes the idea of radioactive decay of long-lived unstable isotopes in minerals to search for the age of events.

===== Monazite geochronology =====
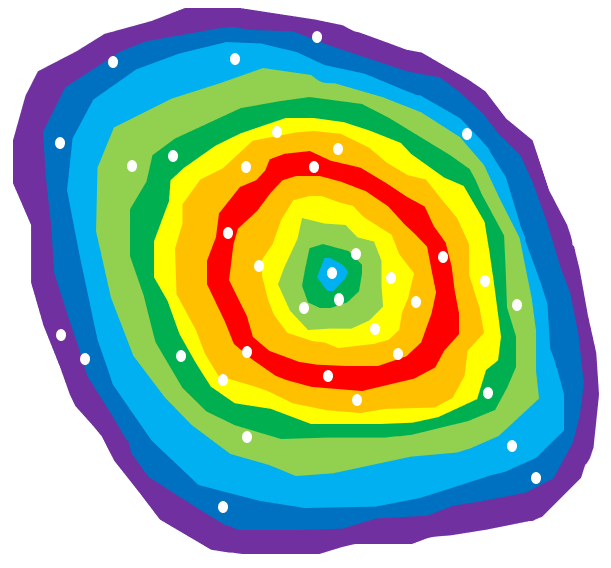
Monazite crystals (white dots) are often included in a concentrically zoned garnet (each colored ring represents a zone). Dating of monazite inclusions can therefore allow estimation of the age of each garnet zone.

In the study of metamorphic petrology, uranium–thorium–lead dating of monazite (monazite geochronology) is an effective method to determine the P-T history. Monazite is a phosphate mineral containing light rare-earth-elements (LREE) that occurs in a wide range of rock types. It usually incorporates radioactive thorium (Th) during its crystal formation, making age determination possible.

Monazite has characteristics of high closure temperature (>1000 °C), variable composition, and robustness under a large temperature range, which help in the record of geological history in metamorphic rocks. An electron microprobe is usually used for the measurement of monazite composition.

====== Monazite inclusions ======
Monazite usually occurs as inclusions in the porphyroblasts in metamorphic rocks.

For instance, during the growth of garnet zones in metamorphic processes, monazite grains are included into the zones of garnets. Since garnets are quite stable upon changing temperature, the included monazite grains are well preserved and prevented from the re-setting of decay system and age. Therefore, the age of the metamorphic events in each zone can be estimated.

====== Monazite growth zoning ======
Apart from occurring as inclusion in garnets, monazite also display zonal growth pattern itself upon changing P-T conditions.

Monazite tends to capture Th when it is formed. When monazite crystal is growing, the earlier formed monazites incorporate many Th, and leaving a Th-depleted surrounding environment. Hence, the older formed monazite has a higher concentration of Th than younger monazite. Therefore, dating zoned matrix monazites (i.e. monazites that do not form as inclusions in other minerals) of the metamorphic rock can obtain information about the age as well as their formation sequence. The dating method is usually done by using an electron microprobe to observe the compositional zones of monazite, then analyzing the U-Th-Pb age of each zone to reconstruct the time of the relevant P-T conditions. Data obtained from matrix monazites are often compared with those obtained from monazite inclusions for the metamorphic history interpretation.

===== Zircon geochronology =====
Zircon is another suitable mineral for dating metamorphic rocks. It occurs as an accessory mineral in rocks and contains trace amount of uranium (U).

As zircon is resistant towards weathering and high temperature, it is a useful mineral in recording geological processes. Similar as monazite, zircon also displays zoned patterns upon varying P-T conditions, which each zone records information of the changing past environment. U-Pb dating is commonly used in dating zircon ages. Zircon geochronology gives good record of ages in cooling and exhumation processes. However it is less reactive than monazite under metamorphic events, and performs better in dating igneous rocks.

=== Forward approach (Thermal modeling) ===
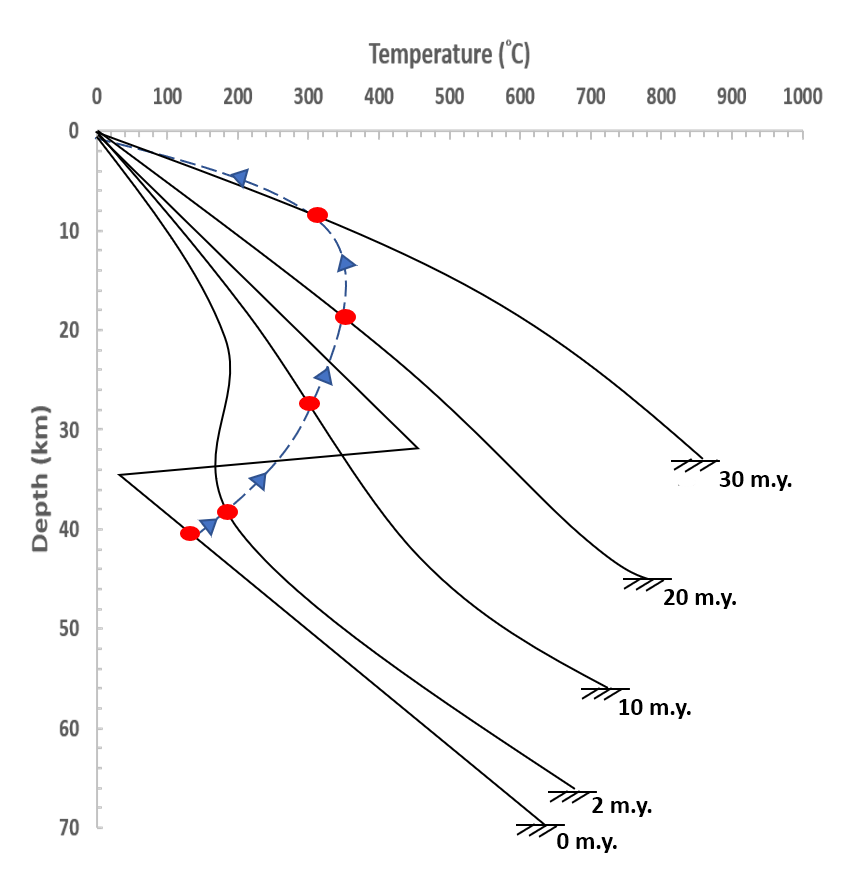
An example of using thermal modeling in P-T-t path reconstruction. The above diagram shows the calculated geothermal gradients upon crustal thickening at 0 million year (m.y.) followed by an immediate uplift event at a rate of 1 mm per year. The P-T-t evolution of a rock originally at 40 km below ground is marked as red dots on the diagram. The corresponding P-T-t path trajectory is also inferred (blue dotted line). Edited from Peacock(1989).

Unlike using traditional petrological investigation methods (e.g. optical microscopy, geothermobarometry) to inversely infer the metamorphic events from rock samples, thermal modeling is a forward method that attempts to work on the geological evolution of rocks.

Thermal modeling applies numerical modeling techniques based on heat transfer equations, different tectonics models and reactions of metamorphic minerals in the simulation of the possible metamorphic events. It works on the temperature variation of the earth crust over time based on rate of heat transfer and diffusion along the disturbed geothermal gradient (normal heat distribution in the ground).

Thermal modeling does not give the actual geological time. However, it provides accurate estimation of the duration of the thermal events. An advantage of thermal modeling is that it provides a holistic estimation of the duration of different stages of metamorphism, which is somehow difficult to completely extract from geochronological methods.

The model simulation involves solving the continuous time-dependent differential heat transfer equation by its approximate discrete finite difference form using computer programs such as FORTRAN.

After the equations are set, a grid of nodes is generated for calculation of each point. Boundary conditions (normally temperature of the geothermal gradients) are input into the equations to calculate the temperature at boundaries. Results are compared with petrological experimental results for validation.

By combining petrological methods and thermal modeling techniques, the understanding of metamorphic processes due to tectonic events is facilitated. Petrological results provide realistic variables to be plugged into a model simulation, while numerical modeling techniques often place constraints on the possible tectonic environments. The two methods complement the limitations of each other, and formulate a comprehensive evolutionary history of the metamorphic and tectonic events.

== Tectonic implications ==
=== Collision setting ===
Areas with collision-related tectonic events or under subduction zones commonly produce metamorphic rocks with clockwise P-T-t paths with near-isothermal decompressional P-T trajectories, and the reason is as follows:

1. During prograde metamorphism until peak, initial heating and compression until arriving a high pressure-low temperature (HPLT) peak is shown, suggesting an early phase of progressing burial due to crustal thickening without receiving much heat.
2. At stage 1 retrograde metamorphism, near-isothermal decompression after the peak, which indicates uplift and exhumation of the compressed rock in the orogenic belt or forearc.
3. At stage 2 retrograde metamorphism, further decompression and cooling occur at a slow rate, implying further erosion after the tectonic event.

In addition, recent studies based on mechanical analysis reveal that peak pressure recorded in clockwise P-T paths does not necessarily represent the maximum depth of burial, but can also represent a change in the tectonic pattern.

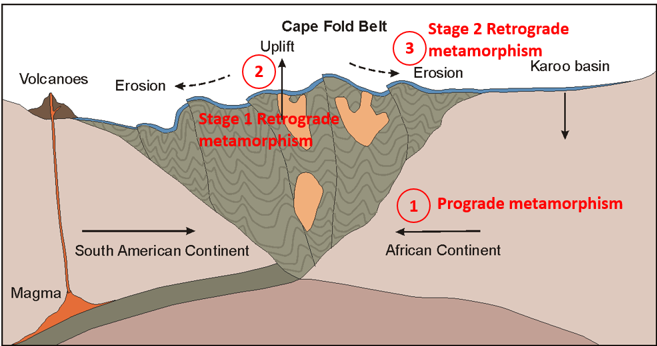
In continental collision setting, crustal thickening takes place, which brings about prograde metamorphism of underlying rocks. Continuous compression results in the development of thrust belts, which leads to a great drop in pressure experienced by originally underlying rocks and results in near-isothermal decompression (Stage 1 retrograde metamorphism). Exhumation and erosion further promote a decrease in P-T condition (Stage 2 retrograde metamorphism).

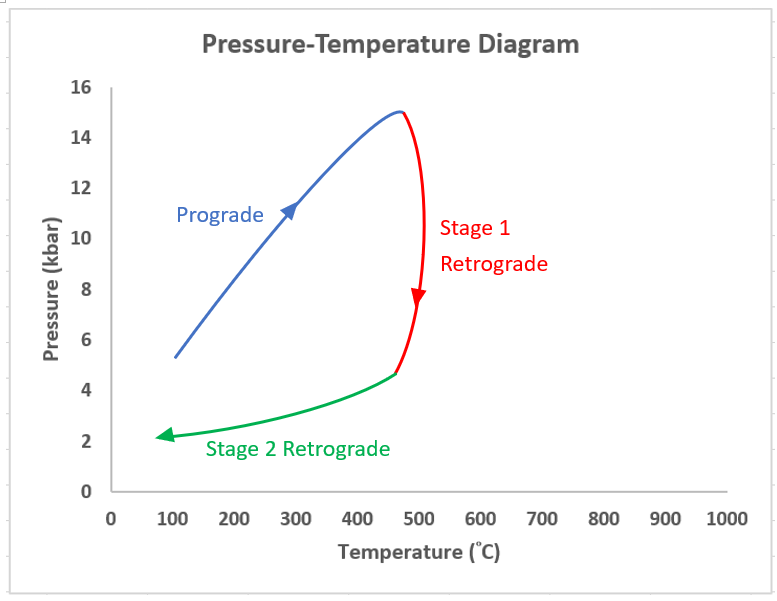
A typical clockwise P-T-t path representing a collision or subduction setting. Prograde metamorphism occurred upon increasing P-T environment until reaching the peak, followed by near-isothermal decompression (Stage 1 retrograde metamorphism), and further exhumation and erosion (Stage 2 retrograde metamorphism).

=== Intrusion ===
Intrusions such as hotspots or rifts at mid-ocean ridges commonly produce metamorphic rocks displaying anticlockwise P-T-t paths patterns with near-isobaric cooling P-T trajectories, and the reason is as follow:

1. During prograde metamorphism until peak, initial heating and compression until reaching a low pressure-high temperature (LPHT) peak is shown, implying an event of heating generated from below and the crust is slightly thickened. This reflects the action of magma intrusion and erupted as sheet intrusive layer such as sills, resulting in a slight increase in pressure but a great increase in temperature.
2. During retrograde metamorphism, near-isobaric cooling after the peak took place, indicating that the rock stays at the same position while the magma cools.
  Intrusion of magma results in a great increment in temperature and a slight increase in pressure experienced by the underlying rocks, which gives prograde metamorphism. Cooling of erupted magma causes a near-isobaric temperature drop and leads to retrograde metamorphism of the underlying rocks.
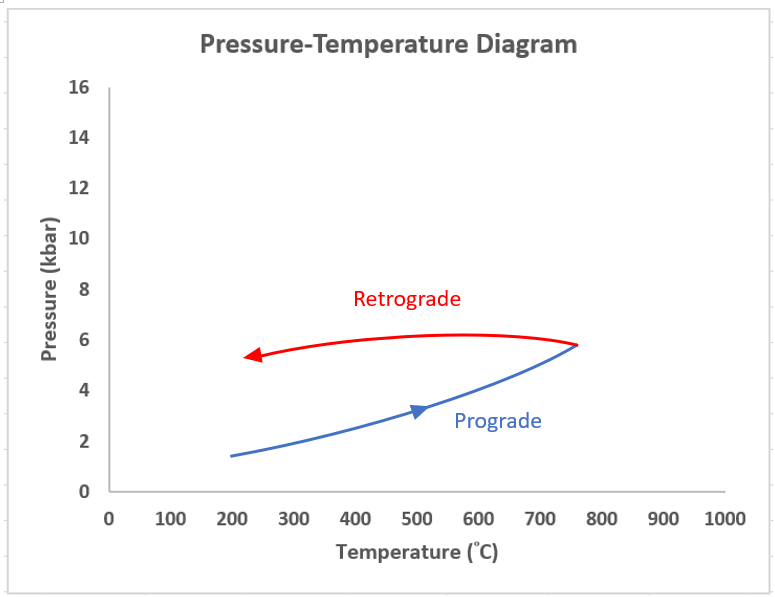
  A typical anticlockwise P-T-t path representing an intrusion origin. A great temperature increment during prograde metamorphism due to overlying hot magma, followed by near-isobaric cooling in retrograde metamorphism when the magma cools.

=== Paired metamorphic belts ===
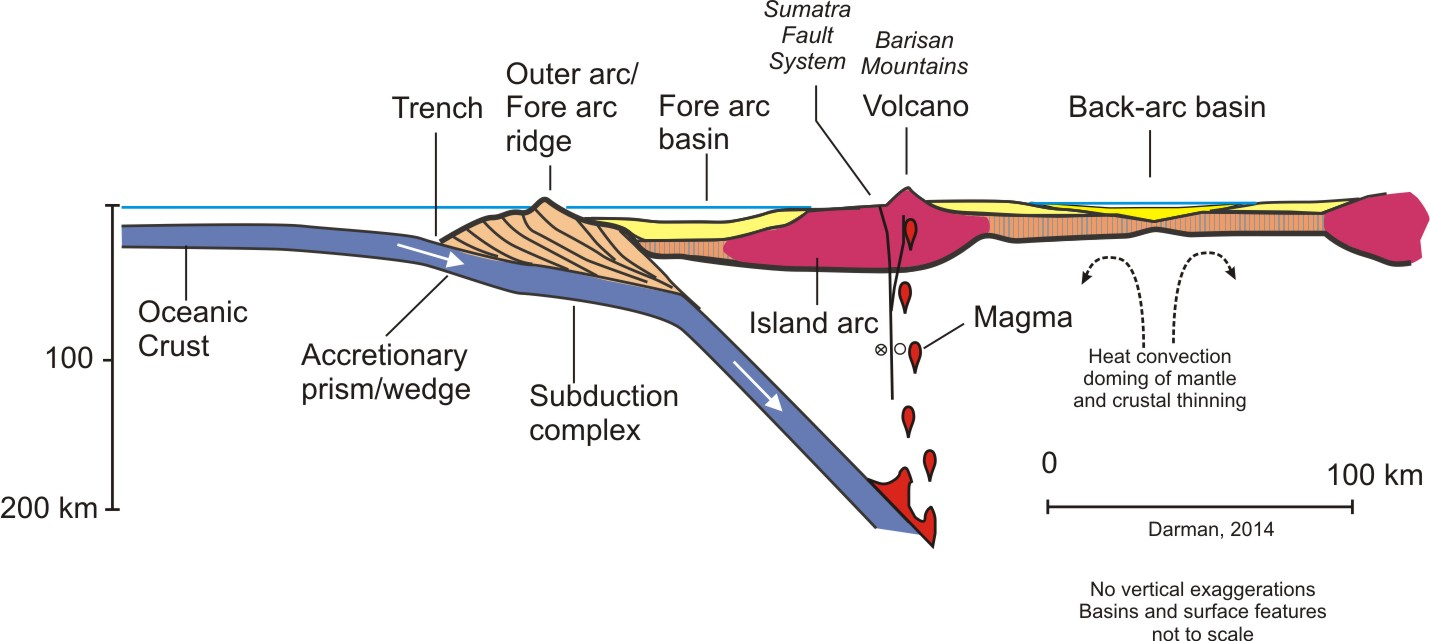
Convergent plate boundaries with subduction zones and volcanic arcs, where paired metamorphic belts with contrasting metamorphic mineral assemblages are found. Clockwise P-T-t paths are commonly found in the forearc, while anticlockwise P-T-t paths are found in the volcanic arc or back-arc basin.

Both clockwise and anticlockwise metamorphic P-T-t paths are found in paired metamorphic belts at convergent plate boundaries. Paired metamorphic belts display two contrasting mineral assemblages sets:

- A high pressure-low temperature (HPLT) belt
- A low pressure-high temperature (LPHT) belt

The HPLT metamorphic belt is located along subduction zones, and commonly associated with a clockwise P-T-t path. The HPLT condition is resulted from crustal thickening due to convergence meanwhile without being heated by magma.

The LPHT metamorphic belt is observed at volcanic arcs or back-arc basins, which is attributed to magma intrusion derived from partial melting of the subducting slab, and the melt rises to the crust. This area is associated with an anticlockwise P-T-t path.

The P-T-t paths provide in-depth investigations and implications of the mechanisms in the lithosphere, and further support the plate tectonic theory and the formation of supercontinents.

=== Plume tectonics ===
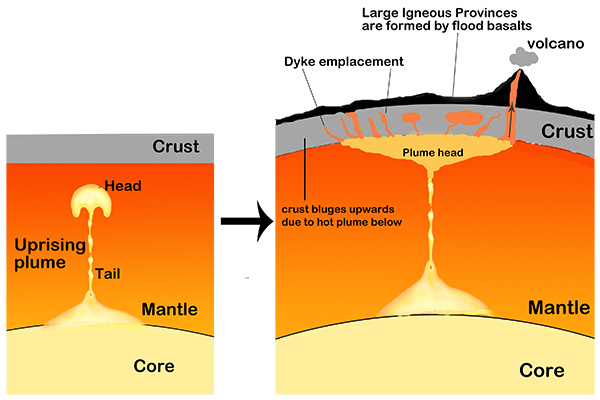
A diagram of plume tectonics. A mantle plume rises from the core to the surface.

P-T-t paths play an important role in the development of plume tectonics, supported by anticlockwise P-T paths.

Plume tectonics are considered to be the dominant process forming the Archean crust with evidence from the study of the Archean cratonic blocks in the North China Craton. Anticlockwise P-T paths with near-isobaric cooling after the peak are normally found in the Archean rocks, suggesting an intrusion origin.

The lack of a paired metamorphic belt as well as a paired clockwise P-T path in the Archean rocks eliminates the possibility of the volcanic arc formation. Evidenced together by a large doming structure, widespread of komatiites and bimodal volcanism, it is proposed that plume tectonics is the major crust-forming process in the Archean. This has led to further research on the beginning of plate tectonics and numerical modeling of the early Earth condition.

=== Structural deformation ===
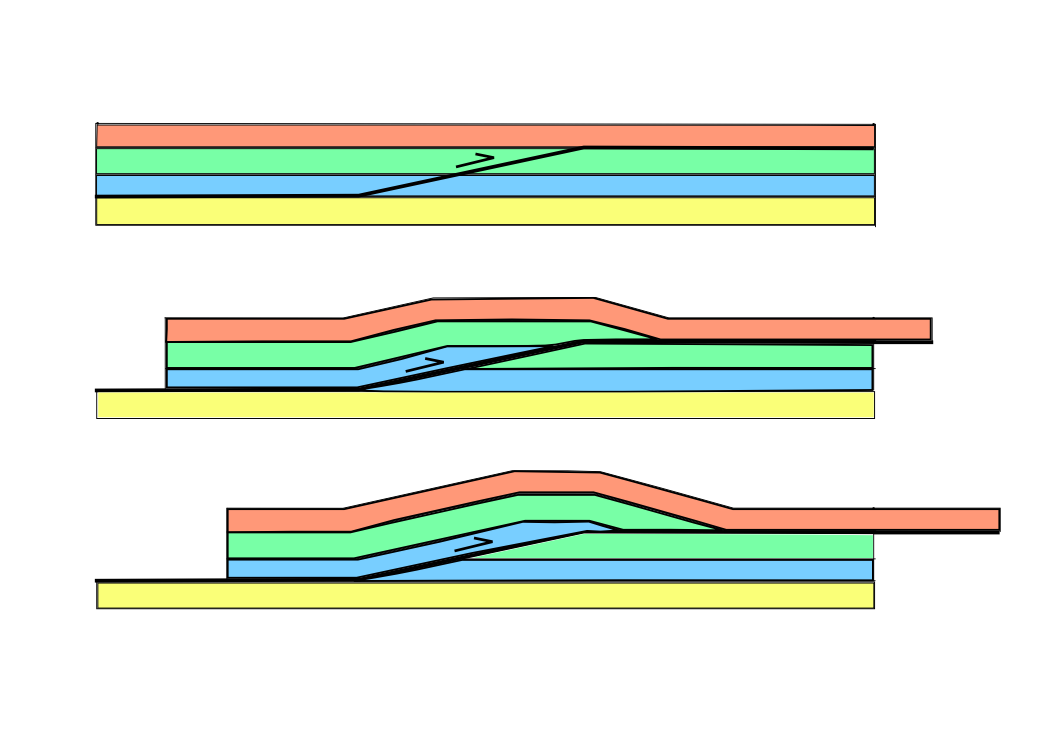
During the formation of a fault-bend-fold, the lower segment (footwall) is heated while the upper thrust sheet (hanging wall) is cooled because of thrusting.

Multiple thrusting such as duplexes would result in complex thermal profile of the rocks.

P-T-t paths can be used to estimate possible structures in the field as heat would transfer in small scale advective heat flow during thrusting and folding of metamorphic rocks.

For example, during the formation of fault-bend-fold, the rocks in the lower segment (footwall) are heated due to contact with the hotter upper thrust sheet (hanging wall), while the upper thrust sheet is cooling because of losing heat in a downward direction. Thus, the lower segment and the upper thrust sheet are undergoing prograde metamorphism and retrograde metamorphism respectively.

Nevertheless, special attention should be taken to the effect of multiple thrusting such as duplexes, where the initial lower plate in an earlier thrust would become the upper plate in a later thrusting event. Depending on the location of the rock, a variety of complex P-T trajectories can be found, which may make interpretation of a terrain challenging.

== Historical development of P-T-t paths ==
The different metamorphic facies under various P-T conditions.

=== Metamorphic facies ===
Metamorphic facies is a classification system first introduced by Pentti Eskola in 1920 to classify particular metamorphic mineral assemblages that are stable under a range of P-T conditions. Before the mid-1970s, geologists utilized the metamorphic facies classification to investigate metamorphic rocks and determined their P-T characteristics. However, little was known about the evolutionary processes of these P-T conditions and how metamorphic rocks reach the surface at that time.

=== Metamorphic path ===
The relation between metamorphism and tectonic setting was not well investigated until 1974, which Oxburgh and Turcotte suggested that the origin of the metamorphic belt is a result of the thermal effects brought by continental collision. The idea was picked up by England and Richardson and further research was done in 1977, and the P-T-t path concept was fully developed by Richardson and Thompson in 1984.

==== Findings ====
The thermal modeling from Richardson and Thompson (1984) reveals that in every case of thermal relaxation after the tectonic event, there is a large portion of heat equilibrium before being significantly influenced by erosion, i.e. the rate of metamorphism is found to be much slower than duration of the thermal event. This infers that the rock is a poor heat conductor, which the maximum temperature experienced by the rock as well as its temperature change are insensitive to erosion rate. Therefore, both the evidence of the maximum pressures and temperatures experienced by the buried layers can be imprinted in the underlying metamorphic rocks. Hence, the buried depth as well as plausible tectonic settings can be deduced. Altogether with dating techniques, geologists can even determine the time scale of the tectonic events in respect to the metamorphic events.

== Future development ==
Metamorphic P-T-t paths have been widely recognized as a useful tool in determining the metamorphic history and tectonic evolution of a region. Potential future research directions for P-T-t paths will be likely developed in the following areas:

- Refining dating methods and techniques e.g. incorporating other elements such as Fe^{3+} into the thermodynamic calculations of ultra-high temperature (UHT) metamorphic minerals
- Refining geodynamic models e.g. investigating the effect of slab break-off on metamorphic P-T-t paths, further testing on P-T-t paths and their corresponding geodynamic models
- Spatial permeability of rocks upon metamorphism and deformation
- Origin of metamorphic mineral inclusions in resistant metamorphic host minerals
- Unified theory of lithosphere evolution and formation using evolution mechanisms of metamorphic rocks and their ages
- P-T-t changes of rocks under shock metamorphism using the combination of electron microscopy, imaging techniques and model simulation
- Thermal evolution of meteorites and their parent asteroids using the combination of thermal modeling and diffusion zoning of minerals in chondrites
