= Cathaysia =

Late Paleozoic microcontinent

Map of the world at the Carboniferous-Permian boundary (~ 300 million years ago) showing Cathaysia (pink)

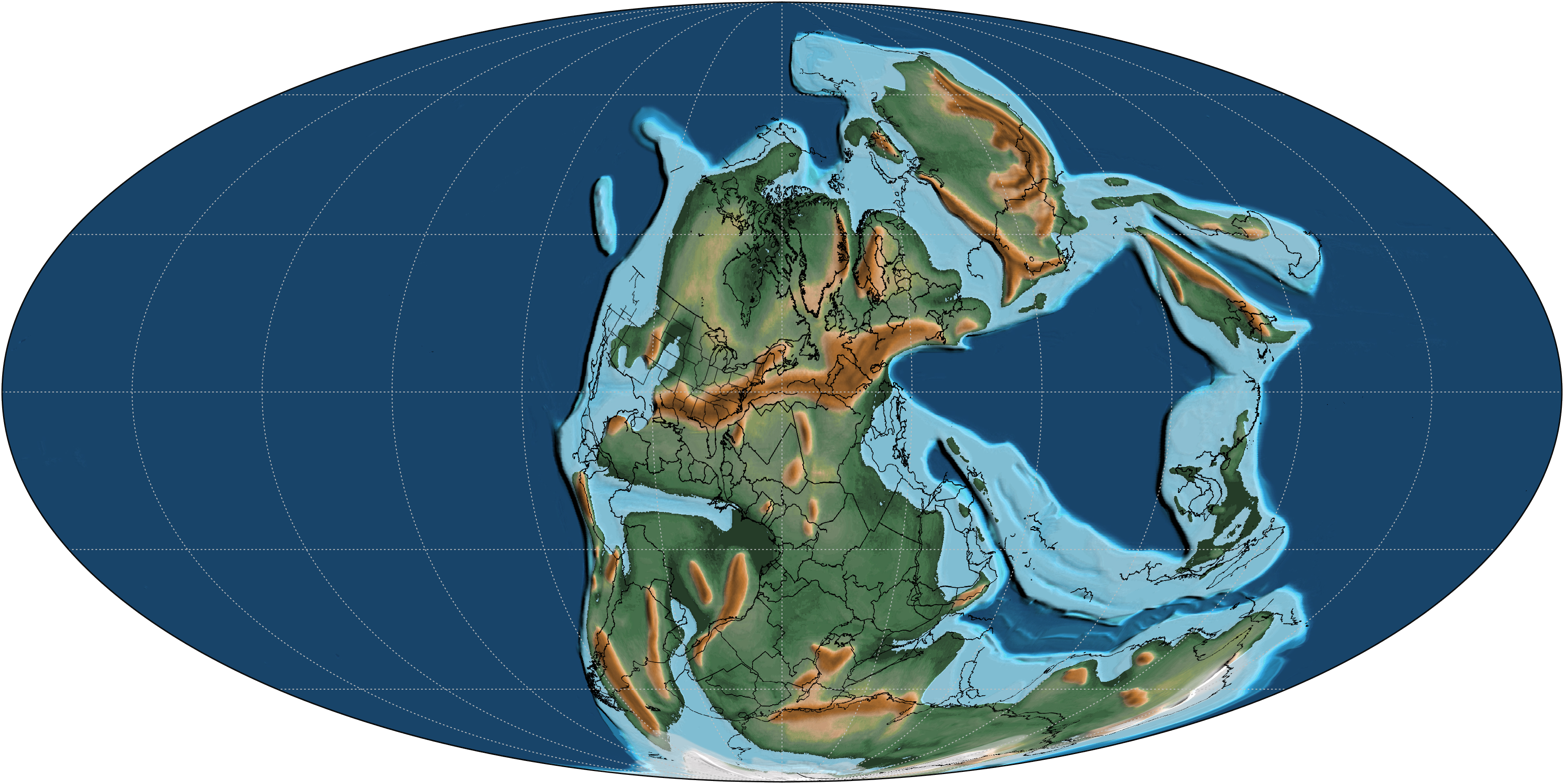
Map of Earth during the Kungurian c. 275 million years ago, showing Cathyasia at the eastern edge of the Tethys

Cathaysia was a microcontinent or a group of terranes that rifted off Gondwana during the Late Paleozoic. They mostly correspond to the modern territory of China, historically referred to in Europe as Cathay, which was split into the North China and South China blocks.

== Terminology ==
The terms "Cathaysia", "Cathaysialand" and "Cathaysia Terrane" have been used by various authors for different continental blocks or terranes and assemblages thereof. During the Devonian, the South China and Indochina continents had separated from Gondwana and they collided during the Carboniferous to finally form a superterrane in the Permian. "Cathaysia" has been used for some or all of the constellations involved in this tectonic journey. For example, in Li et al. 2010 South China formed from the amalgamation of the "Yangtse and Cathaysia Blocks", whilst Scotese & McKerrow 1990 groups North China, South China, and Indochina into the "Cathaysian terranes".

Cathaysia, sensu Scotese, are a few of the almost 70 microcontinents that are involved in the formation of Asia. Furthermore, Cathaysia, both sensu Scotese and Li et al., is grouped among the "lonely wanderers" of Meert 2014 — smaller continents whose position varies dramatically between plate reconstructions.

== Paleoclimate ==
During the Permian Cathaysia/South China was located near the Equator and within the Paleo-Tethys Ocean together with the North China continent and these two small continents share what is often called the "Cathaysian floras and faunas" (in contrast to the "Gondwanan floras and faunas"). As North and South China collided during the Late Triassic the Qinling Ocean closed. South China was covered with coal forests formed by seed ferns of the order Callistophytales, whilst tree-like Lycopodiophytes survived into the Permian.

== See also ==
- Cimmeria (continent) – Ancient string of microcontinents that rifted from Gondwana
- Huaxia – Ancient Chinese self-designation of the Central Plains peoples
- Wuyi Mountains – Mountain range in China
