= South China Craton =

Precambrian continental block located in China

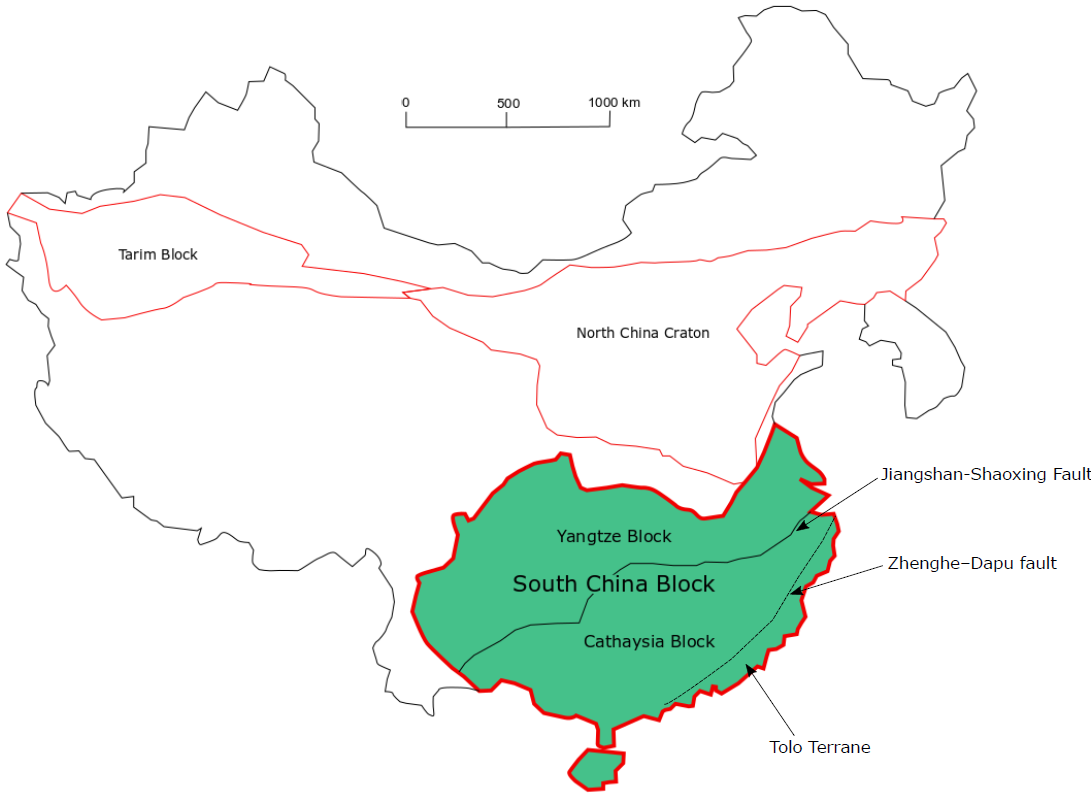
Three Precambrian cratonic bodies in China (i.e. North China Craton, Tarim Block and South China Block). The South China Block occupies the bulk of South China. It is divided into the Yangtze block in the northwest and the Cathaysia Block in the southeast. Modified from Zheng, Xiao & Zhao (2013).

The South China Craton or South China Block is one of the Precambrian continental blocks in China. It is traditionally divided into the Yangtze Block in the NW and the Cathaysia Block in the SE. The Jiangshan–Shaoxing Fault represents the suture boundary between the two sub-blocks. Recent study suggests that the South China Block possibly has one more sub-block which is named the Tolo Terrane. The oldest rocks in the South China Block occur within the Kongling Complex, which yields zircon U–Pb ages of 3.3–2.9 Ga.

There are three important reasons to study the South China Block. First, South China hosts a great deal of rare-earth element (REE) ores. Second, the South China Block is a key component of the Rodinia supercontinent. Therefore, such study helps us understand more about the supercontinent cycle. Third, almost all major known clades of Triassic marine reptiles have been recovered from the South China sedimentary sequences. They are important to understand the marine recovery after the Permian-Triassic mass extinction.

The South China Block was formed by collision between the Yangtze Block and Cathaysia Block in the Neoproterozoic. On the one hand, the central and eastern part of the South China Block experienced three important Phanerozoic tectonic events. In the Chinese literature, they are named the Wuyi-Yunkai Movement (Early Paleozoic), the Indosinian Movement (Triassic) and the Yanshanian Movement (Jurassic-Cretaceous). They led to extensive deformation and magmatism.

On the other hand, the Late Paleozoic Emeishan flood basalt magmatism is an important event in the western part of the block.

== Geology ==
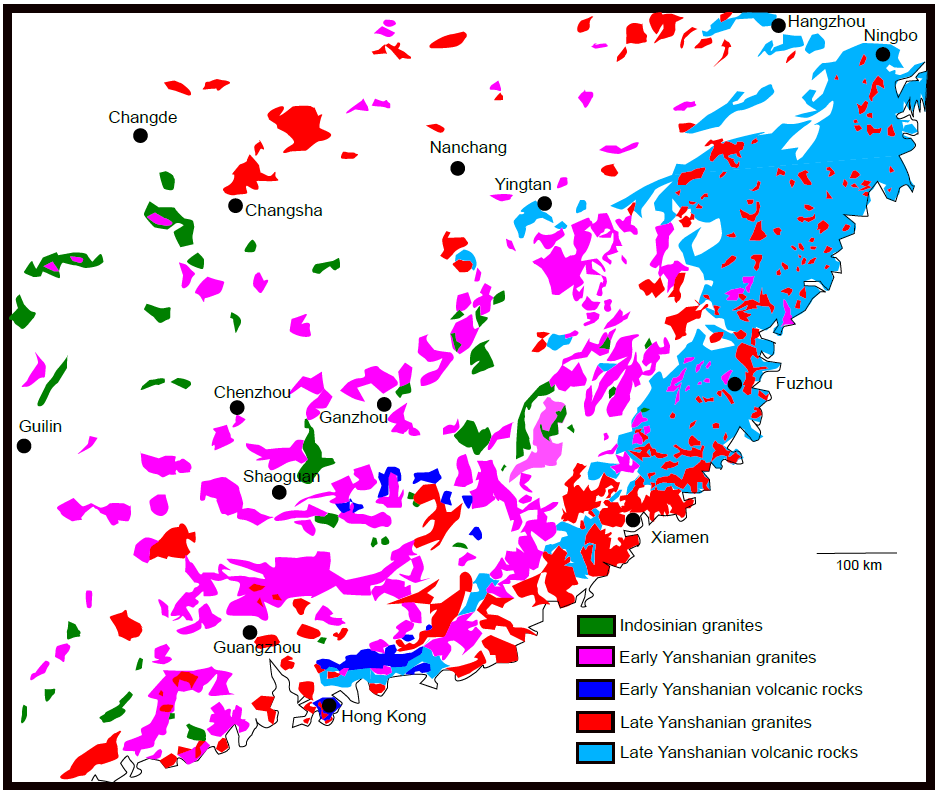
Distribution of igneous rock in the Cathaysia Block. Modified from Wang et al., (2013).

South China Block is formed by the assembly of both the Yangtze and Cathaysia blocks along the northeasterly trending Jiang-Shao Fault. However, the southwestern extension of this suture is poorly understood due to poor exposure.

Yangtze Block contains several Archean—Paleoproterozoic crystalline basements (e.g. Kongling Complex). The igneous rocks are unconformably overlain by weakly metamorphosed Neoproterozoic sequences (e.g., Banxi Group) and unmetamorphosed Sinian units. In contrast, the Cathaysia block does not contain any Archean basement. Instead, it is composed of mainly Neoproterozoic basement rocks. Rare occurrence of Paleoproterozoic rocks and Mesoproterozoic rocks are reported in southwest Zhejiang and Hainan Island respectively.

Paleozoic magmatism is not common in the South China Block. However, a late Permian Emeishan large igneous province is reported in the western margin of the Yangtze Block.

Mesozoic magmatism is very extensive, especially in the Cathaysia block.

== Components ==
This section focuses on how the components of the South China Block were formed.

The South China Block is traditionally divided into the Yangtze Block in the northwest and the Cathaysia Block in the southeast. The northeast-trending Jiangshan-Shaoxing Fault represents the boundary (i.e. suture). It starts from Jiangshan through Shaoxing to Pingxiang. However, the southern extension of the boundary remains unclear. Before they collided together to form the South China block in the Neoproterozic, both of them were part of the Columbia supercontinent.

Recent studies have proposed that the South China Block is possibly divided into three instead of two units. The newly defined unit is termed the Tolo Terrane, which is next to the eastern margin of the Cathaysia Block. The northeast-trending Zhenghe–Dapu fault is thought to be the suture between the Cathaysia Block and the Tolo Terrane. The Tolo Channel Fault in Hong Kong possibly represents a trace of the suture. Therefore, the newly defined unit is named the Tolo Terrane.

=== Yangtze Block ===
The study of the formation of the Yangtze Block is challenging due to rare Archean outcrops. It is believed that it was formed at around 3.8 – 3.2 Ga. The timing is earlier than the establishment of the Columbia supercontinent. This is supported by the preserved ancient crustal remnant (i.e. 3.8 Ga detrital zircon derived from the South China Block).

Yangtze Block later became part of the Columbia, but its position has only been constrained poorly. The U-Pb crystallization age distribution of 7000 detrital zircons is characterized by several peaks over the history of Earth spans. Those peaks coincide with the age of supercontinent assembly. The Columbia assembled through a global collision event during 2.1-1.8 Ga. Therefore, the constituent continental blocks of the Columbia should record a larger population of 2.1-1.8 Ga detrital zircon. In fact, The Kunyang Group in the Yangtze Block shows this pattern. However, the position of the block is poorly known. It possibly connected with North China, western Australia and/or northwestern Laurentia.

=== Cathaysia Block ===
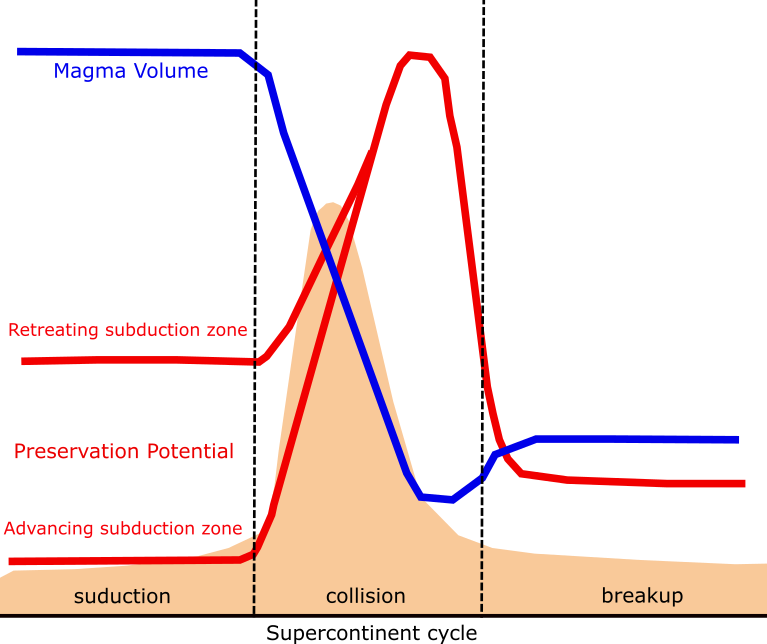
The supercontinent cycle is divided into three stages. The continental blocks first converge by subduction. Then, They collide to form the supercontinent. Finally, they drift apart from each other, leading to the supercontinent breakup. The interplay between magma generation and preservation potential of the detrital zircon determine the age distribution of the detrital zircon in three stages. Although the volume of magma generated is low during collision, the high preservation potential results in a peak of the number of detrital zircon. Therefore, the age peak is coincident with the assembly of the supercontinent. Blue: Magma volume. Red: Preservation potential. Brown area: Age distribution of the detrital zircon. Modified from Hawkesworth et al. (2009).

There is only fragmentary study on the formation of the Cathaysia Block due to sparse Precambrian outcrop.

Unlike the Yangtze Block, no Archean outcrop and basement are identified in the Cathaysia Block. However, the finding of Late Archean detrital zircons led scientists to speculate the existence of an unexposed Archean basement. This idea is challenged by the fact that the zircons are oval in shape. They were possibly transported a long distance from another block that was once close to the Cathaysia Block.

Another competing idea suggests that the Cathaysia Block was formed during the assembly of the Columbia supercontinent in the Paleoproterozoic. There are two pieces of evidence.

- Sedimentary rocks show a greater population of 2.1-1.8 Ga detrital zircons.
- The age of the oldest igneous rock coincides with the time of final assembly of the Columbia supercontinent (e.g. 1.89–1.86 Ga S-type granitoids in Badu Complex).

The Cathaysia Block was possibly contiguous with East Antarctica, Laurentia and Australia. It is suggested that the Late Archean oval-shaped detrital zircons were brought from those blocks.

=== Tolo Terrane ===
The study of the Tolo Terrane is at the initial stage. Most of the evidence comes from Hong Kong. The Tolo Terrane possibly represents a fragment of the Qiangtang Terrane. When the South China Block collided with the India Craton in the Cambrian, the Qiangtang Terrane was sandwiched between those two blocks. During the collision, a fragment (i.e. Tolo Terrane) was calved off from the Qiangtang Terrane.

== Formation ==
This section focuses on how the South China Block was formed. Traditionally, the South China Block was formed by the collision between the Yangtze Block and the Cathaysia Block in the Neoproterozoic. They collided to form the Jiangnan Orogen. If the Tolo Terrane does exist, the final formation time should be pushed forward to the Jurassic.

=== Amalgamation of the Yangtze block and Cathaysia block ===
The divergent double subduction system is characterized by two synchronous arcs and low grade metamorphism. Grey: sediment.

There are four major controversies about the amalgamation process.

- The timing of amalgamation is unclear.
- The process of amalgamation is uncertain.
- The genesis of the Neoproterozoic (830—740 Ma) post-collision magmatism is unclear.
- The position in the Rodinia supercontinent is controversial.

==== Timing of amalgamation ====
There are two schools of thought.

- They were separated by an early or late Paleozoic ocean. Closure of the ocean by subduction led to amalgamation in the Silurian or Triassic. However, no Silurian or Triassic arc magmatism is found along the Jiangnan Orogen. Therefore, more and more researchers discarded this hypothesis.
- They assembled in the Neoproterozoic.

==== Process of Amalgamation ====
A great deal of single-sided subduction systems have been proposed. The diversity arises from different subduction manner including orthogonal subduction, oblique subduction or change in subduction polarity. There is also disagreement on the tectonic setting of the rocks. (e.g. intra-oceanic arc versus continental arc, backarc versus forearc).

Despite so, only divergent double subduction system can provide plausible explanation on two key observations in the Jiangnan Orogen.

- Magmatic arcs developed on the margin of the two blocks during the early Neoproterozoic. This indicates that the oceanic plate subducted on two opposite directions simultaneously.
- Most rocks merely experienced greenschist facies metamorphism (i.e. no high-grade metamorphism). In single-sided subduction system, the subducted oceanic slab would drag the continental crust along the subduction zone, leading to crustal thickening and high-grade metamorphism. This is referred to as deep continental subduction. In divergent double subduction system, no deep continental subduction occurs.

==== The Neoproterozoic post-collision magmatism ====
After the amalgamation, it is widely recognized that continental rifting and widespread 800—760 Ma bimodal magmatism occurred in the South China Block. Two models have been proposed.

- The magmatism was caused by slab-break off. When the subducted oceanic slab sank into the mantle, this induced mantle upwelling and subsequent decompression melting. The mantle was melted to generate mafic magma. The mafic magma either intruded or underplated the overlying continental crust to form felsic magma. Therefore, mafic and felsic igneous rocks coexisted.
- The magmatism was due to the Rodinia giant mantle plume. Previous study advocated for a so-called "SWEAT" configuration (i.e. Southwest Laurentia–East Antarctic) in the Rodinia supercontinent. However, the age and geographical position of giant plume-related radiating dyke swarm argue against this model. First, the age difference is too large to be considered as the same dyke swarm. Second, the dyke swarm in Laurentia suggest a mantle plume centre to its west but there is no such evidence in eastern Australia.

The South China Block possibly serves as this missing link (i.e. the "missing link" hypothesis). They suggest the head of the mantle plume, which was sited beneath the South China Block, led to rifting and bimodal magmatism since 825 Ma. The discovery of 825 Ma komatiitic basalts in Yiyang, which is indicative of a hot mantle source, provides an indisputable evidence for the presence of a mantle plume. However, there is alternative genesis of komatiites like hydrous melting in the subduction zone. Moreover, no Neoproterozoic Large Igneous Province has been identified in the South China Block.

==== Position in Rodinia ====
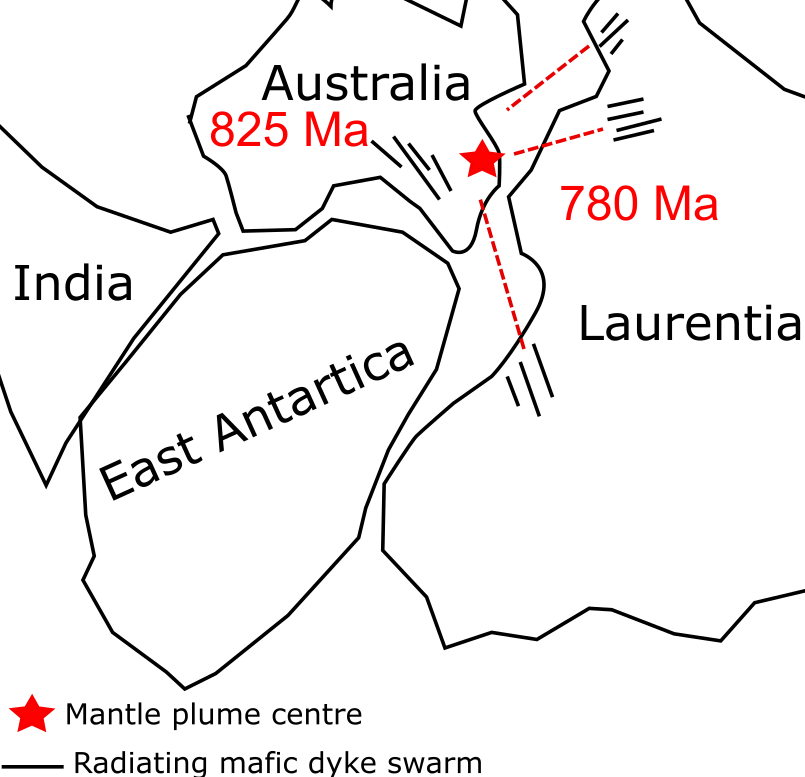
Missing link hypothesis. (Li, 2003)

There is no consensus about the position of the South China Block in the Rodinia supercontinent. The main controversy is whether it was located in the interior or at the margin of Rodinia.

On the one hand, the South China Block is proposed to be located between eastern Australia and western Laurentia in the interior of Rodinia (i.e. "Missing-link" hypothesis). Several lines of evidence support this hypothesis.

- Superplume record: A block, sitting above the head of a mantle plume, between eastern Australia and the western Laurentia is required. The South China Block is a suitable candidate.
- Igneous rock record: Felsic granitic and volcanic rocks in Hainan Island are similar to the trans-continental granite-rhyolite province in southern Laurentia in terms of age and isotopic features. This implies a close geographical proximity between the South China Block and Laurentia.

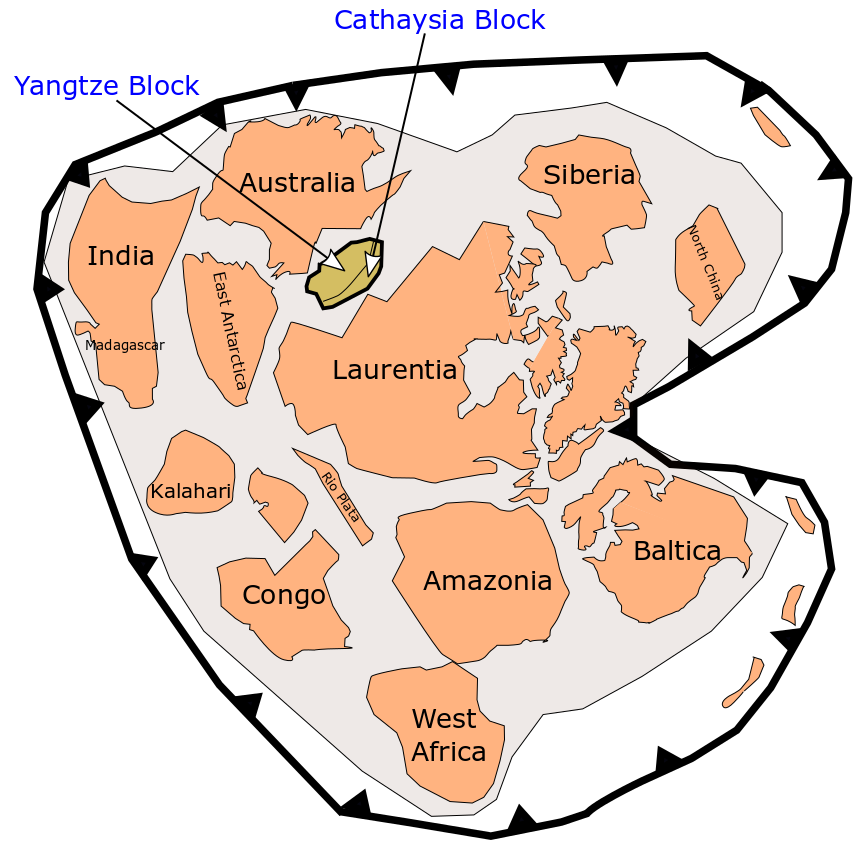
The South China Block is proposed to be located between eastern Australia and western Laurentia in the interior of Rodinia.

Rodinia assembled through global collision events from 1300 Ma to 900 Ma. It is expected that the central part of Rodinia should not record any later collision event since it had already amalgamated. However, there is clear evidence that the final time of the amalgamation of the South China Block is much later than 900 Ma. Therefore, it was not located in the central part of Rodinia. The evidence comes from lithological and structural records.

- The Shuangxiwu arc sequence, which lasted at least to 850 Ma, represents an intra-oceanic arc. This indicates the Yangtze block and the Cathaysia block were still separated by an ocean later than 900 Ma.
- Post-900 Ma obduction-type granite within ophiolites were reported. Ophiolites are fragments of oceanic lithosphere that were incorporated into continental margins during collisions. When they were incorporated into the margins, sedimentary rocks might be melted to form granitic magma. Therefore, the formation age corresponds to the final time of amalgamation.
- A 830 Ma prominent angular unconformity is reported. Ideally, the syn-collision rock strata deformed but the post-collision rock strata did not. Therefore, the age of the angular unconfomity can reveal the termination age of collision.

On the other hand, the South China Block may be located in the periphery of Rodinia. It might be next to northern India and western Australia.

=== Amalgamation of the Cathaysia block and the Tolo Terrane ===
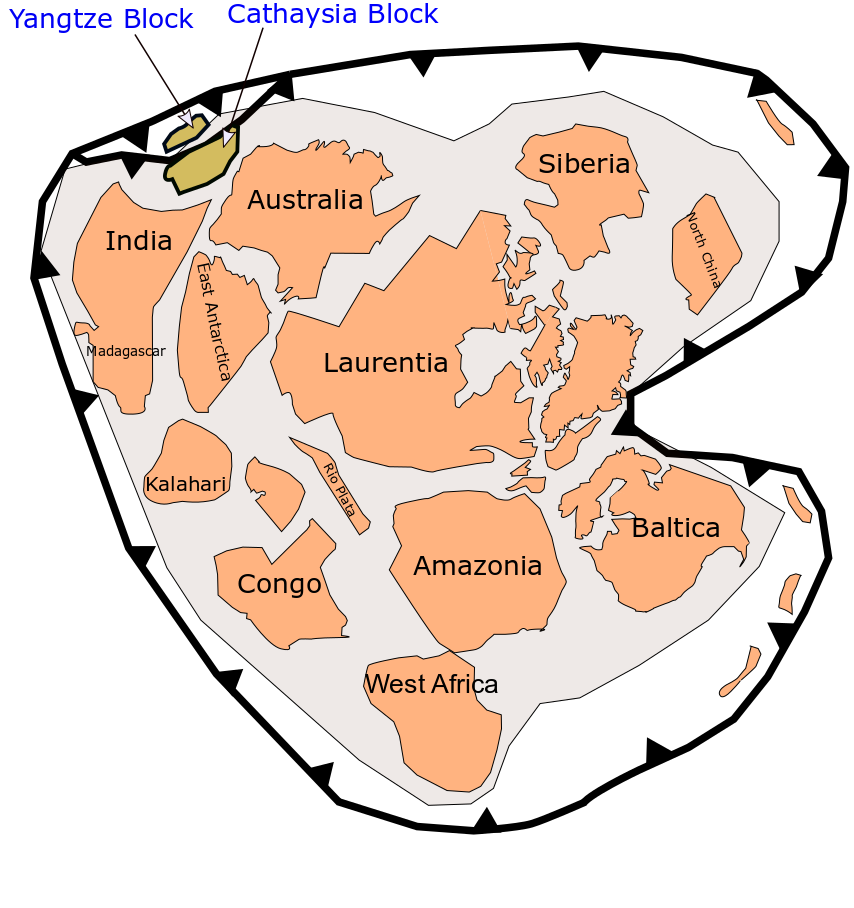
The South China Block may be located in the periphery of the Rodinia.

When the Tolo Terrane was split from the Qiangtang Terrane, it was removed from the collision system by a strike-slip fault. Then, It collided with the Cathaysia Block in the Middle-Late Jurassic. The assembly age is consistent with a major deformation event in Hong Kong (i.e. thrusting and metamorphism in northwestern Hong Kong).

However, this idea is challenged by the rare coeval magmatism along the Zhenghe–Dapu fault. Therefore, the suture may represent a lateral shearing event rather than a collision event. Such a mechanism may be analogous to the sliver-plate tectonics of the Sumatran Subduction Zone. If this is correct, the Tolo Terrane should be considered as part of the Cathaysia Block, rather than a distinct unit.

== Evolution ==
Following the traditional definition, the South China Block was formed by the collision between the Yangtze Block and the Cathaysia Block in the Neoproterozoic. The unified South China Block experienced four important events in the Phanerozoic. They are called the Wuyi-Yunkai Movement (Early Paleozoic), the Emeishan flood basalt magmatism (Late Paleozoic), the Indosinian Movement (Triassic) and the Yanshanian Movement (Jurassic-Cretaceous). The three movements created an array of deformation, magmatism and metamorphism in the South China Block.

=== Wuyi-Yunkai Movement ===
The Wuyi-Yunkai Movement (Ordovician-Silurian) represents the first Phanerozoic tectonic event in the South China Block. Two models have been proposed. They are the intraplate model and Cambrian ocean model. Nowadays, more and more scientists advocate for the intraplate model.

==== Intraplate Model ====
There are four key characteristics of the Wuyi-Yunkai Movement.

- Crustal thickening by folding and thrusting occurred, but there is considerable doubt on the overall deformation features.
- There is widespread Silurian (440–415 Ma) granitic intrusion. The granitic rock includes biotite monzonitic granite and muscovite-, garnet-, and tourmaline-bearing granites. The source of the granitic rock was probably pre-existing crustal material instead of a mantle-derived component, as evidenced by a highly negative epsilon Nd value.
- The rock experienced upper greenschist to amphibolite-facies metamorphism (i.e. 460–445 Ma), which is earlier than the granitic intrusion.
- The Pressure-Temperature curve of the metamorphic rock shows a clockwise curve. This indicates crustal thickening.

Generation of the Silurian (440–415 Ma) granitic intrusion.

This model suggests that this tectonic event occurred in the interior of the unified South China Block. The far-field stress associated with distant continental collisions led to crustal thickening and metamorphism (460–445 Ma) in the interior of the South China Block. The rocks in the lower portion of the lithosphere might be converted into eclogite (i.e. a very dense rock) due to the high pressure burden. This portion of the lithosphere eventually was broken away. It sank into the mantle since it was heavy. This triggered mantle upwelling and subsequent decompression melting. The mantle was melted to generate mafic magma. The mafic magma underplated and melted the over-thickened crust to generate Silurian granitic intrusions.

The driving force of such internal deformation was attributed to the South China Block-India Craton collision in the Cambrian. Following the "Missing-link" hypothesis, the South China Block was placed in the interior of Rodinia. During the Rodinia break-up, the South China Block drifted northward in the middle Neoproterozoic. Subsequently, it collided with the northwest India Craton in the Gondwana margin by the Cambrian. The Qiangtang Terrane was sandwiched between the South China Block and India Craton during collision. The North India Orogen was created during the continental collision. This collision is believed to be the driver for the intracontinental deformation in the South China Block.

The collision history is constrained by sedimentary provenance study. The Ediacaran-Cambrian sedimentary rocks in the Cathaysia Block showed an exotic provenance. They were not derived from the Yangtze Block, continental blocks nearby or recycling of the underlying Cathaysia sedimentary sequences. They were derived from the rock in the India Craton and East African orogen. This suggested a close proximity between the South China Block and India Craton.

==== Cambrian Ocean Model ====
This model suggests that there was a Cambrian ocean between the Yangtze Block and the Cathaysia Block. Closure of the ocean led to collision between those two blocks and subsequent deformation, magmatism and metamorphism. However, the Cambrian sandstone from the Yangtze Block and the Cathaysia Block shows a mixed zircon provenance, which indicates sediment could travel from one block to another one. This argued against the presence of a vast ocean.

=== Emeishan flood basalt magmatism ===
The Emeishan flood basalt magmatism represents the most significant geological feature in Southwest China. The duration of the basalt magmatism is geologically short (i.e. 1.0-1.5 Ma). Petrological and geochemical results provide indisputable evidence for supporting a mantle plume origin. For example, the picrites is proved to represent a high temperature primary magma. In addition, the basalt shows isotopic similarity with ocean island basalt (OIB) which is formed by a mantle plume triggered by subducted oceanic crust.

=== Indosinian and Yanshanian Movement ===
The Indosinian (Triassic) and Yanshanian (Jurassic-Cretaceous) Movement represents the Mesozoic deformation and magmatism event.

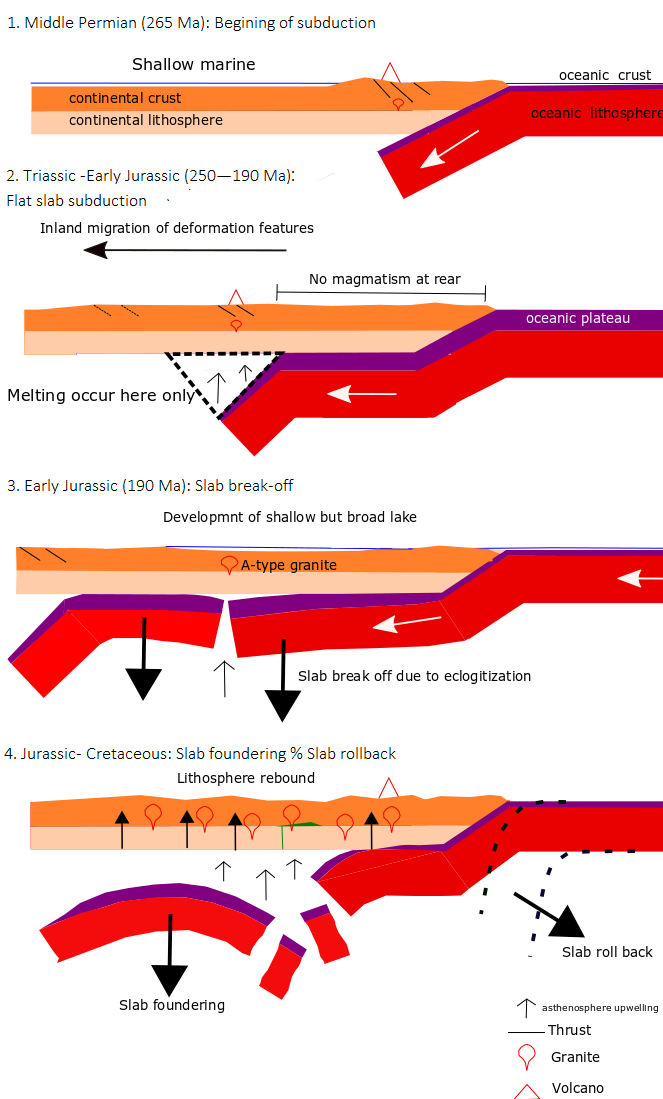

==== Flat slab subduction model ====
There are several characteristics about the Mesozoic tectonic movement.

- The South China Block consists of a very broad (1300 km) Triassic-Early Jurassic northeast-trending fold and thrust belt. The age of thrusting shows a younging trend towards the continental interior. The coeval igneous rocks also show similar spatial-age relationship.
- Major magmatism occurred in the Middle Jurassic. Most of the igneous rocks shows within-plate tectonic settings (i.e. extensional setting).
- The Cretaceous magmatism shows an oceanward younging trend.

Flat slab subduction is usually caused by the arrival of buoyant oceanic plateau (i.e. thicker oceanic crust). As the flat slab penetrated beneath the continental crust, the fold and thrust belt migrated inland, resulting in the younging trend towards the continent. The coeval magmatism could only occur in the front of the flat slab. No magmatism could occur in the rear part of the slab. Therefore, the synchronic igneous rocks shows a similar younging trend.

As time passed by, the oceanic slab is converted to a dense rock (i.e. eclogite). Therefore, the flat slab started to break off and sink. At the same time, it exerted a downward pull on the overlying continental crust to create a broad basin with a lake. When the slab was fully detached from the crust, the overlying crust rebounded. The crust is therefore stretched (i.e. extensional setting). At the same time, a surge of mantle upwelling occurred. This created widespread within-plate igneous rock.

Then, oceanic crust with "normal" thickness arrived on the subduction zone. It is expected that the subduction angle would be increased due to less buoyancy. Therefore, the oceanic crust would roll back. This created an oceanward younging Cretaceous magmatism.

However, this model faces several challenges.

1. Occurrence of a Permian magmatic arc

There are some doubts on the starting time of Pacific plate westward subduction. The Permian synchronous arc magmatism has not been discovered along the coastal Provinces of Southeast China yet. They are only reported in the southern part of the South China Block.

2. Occurrence of Jurassic adakitic rock

A conventional way to generate magma is by melting in the mantle wedge which is aided by the fluid release from the subducted slab. However, adakitic rock is formed from melting the slab directly. Recent research shows that slab melting is possible in flat-slab subduction. Of the ten known flat slab regions worldwide, at least eight are linked to occurrences of adakitic magmas. However, there is no known Late Jurassic adakitic rock in South China.

3. Triassic Tectonic regime

Based on the flat slab subduction, the Mesozoic tectonic setting was dominated by the subduction system of the Paleo-Pacific Plate. However, there is emerging evidence that the Triassic tectonic setting was controlled by the continent-continent collision between the North China Craton, South China Block and Indochina Block (i.e. "Sandwich" model).

Based on the "Sandwich" model, there are two key characteristics of the Indosinian Movement.

East-trending thrust-fold structure and northeast-trending strike slip fault in Hefu shear zone. Modified from Li et al., (2016)

- The deformation is very extensive in the South China Block. There were east and northwest-trending thrust-fold structure and northeast-trending strike slip faults. No special spatial-age relationship is discovered.
- The Triassic granitic magmatism was probably sourced from the pre-existing crustal material instead of the juvenile mantle component. No special spatial-age relationship is discovered.

The South China Block is sandwiched between the North China Craton and the Indochina Block in the Triassic. When the Indochina Block and North China Craton collided with the South China Block, those two collision events created folding, thrusting and strike-slip faulting. At the same time, the overthickened crust led to the Triassic granitic magmatism.

== South East Asia accretion ==
This section explains how the South China Block collided with other neighboring blocks like the North China Block and the Indochina Block.

The South China Block is one of the largest Precambrian continental blocks in Southeast Asia. Present-day Southeast Asia is a huge jigsaw puzzle of different continental blocks which are bounded by sutures or orogenic belts. There are two significant boundaries between the South China Block and other blocks. They are the Qinling-Dabie Orogen in the north and the Song Ma suture in the south. The current configuration of continental blocks is the result of an array of rifting and collision events over more than 400 million years. Simply put, the geological evolution of Southeast Asia is characterized by the Gondwana dispersion and Asian accretion. The Southeast Asia continental blocks successively rifted apart from the Gondwana. As they drifted northward, successive oceanic basins opened between Gondwana and the blocks including the Paleo-Tethys, Meso-Tethys and Ceno-Tethys. Destruction and closure of those basins resulted in accretion of once isolated Southeast Asia continental blocks. For example, the Qinling-Dabie Orogen and the Song Ma suture are related to the destruction of the branches of the Paleo-Tethys.

=== Collision with the North China Block ===
The Qinling-Dabie Orogen represents the orogenic belt between the North China Block and the South China Block. The collision is a two-step process, as suggested by the presence of two suture zones in the collision belt. The Shangdan suture zone and Mianlue suture zone represent collision in the Late Paleozoic and Late Triassic respectively. The latter one is regarded as the "real" amalgamation between two blocks. The Late Triassic collision led to a rapid uplift of the high-grade metamorphic rock, forming one of the world's largest belts of ultrahigh pressure rock.

Tectonic evolution of the North China Block-South China Block collision
| Time | Event | Evidence |
| Late Proterozoic—Cambrian | The North China and South China Block was separated by the ocean. | Differences in sedimentary stratigraphy (e.g. strike of the same group) between both blocks. |
| Ordovician—Early Silurian | The South China Block subducted beneath the North China Block and formed a back-arc basin in North Qinling, which then evolved into the southern active continental margin of the North China Block. | / |
| Middle Silurian—Devonian | Rifting of the South China Block led to the collision between the North Qinling and South Qinling. (i.e. Shangdan suture zone) | Rift sedimentation and alkalic magmatism were active along the southern edge of the South Qinling.; Paleomagnetic data revealed a southward movement of the South China Block. |
| Carboniferous—Permian | Continued rifting led to the formation of ocean between the South China Block and South Qinling. | The Mianlue suture zone represents the closure of this ocean. The ophiolite in this zone provide evidence for a late Paleozoic ocean. For example, the metabasalt shows an N-MORB origin. |
| Early and Middle Triassic | The South China Block subducted beneath South Qinling to form a magmatic arc. | Island-arc calc-alkalic volcanic rocks were formed. |
| Late Triassic | The South China Block and South Qinling were accreted. (i.e. Mianulue suture zone) | Ultrahigh-pressure rocks in Mianlue suture zone like coesite- and diamond-bearing eclogites were formed.; Collision-related granites in the Shangdan suture zone were formed by intracontinental collision and crustal thickening due to strong northward movement of the South China Block. |

=== Collision with the Indochina Block ===
The South China Block probably collided with the Indochina Block in the Late Devonian–Early Carboniferous based on several lines of evidence.

- Large scale Early to Middle Carboniferous deformation event (i.e. folding and thrusting). This indicates a major collision event.
- Pre-middle Carboniferous faunas on either side of the Song Ma zone are different while the Middle Carboniferous faunas are similar. This reveals a juxtaposition between the South China Block and Indochina block.

However, some scientists believed that the collision took place in the Triassic based on the Triassic-aged deformation in the Song Ma suture zone. But, the paleo-environment of northern Vietnam and south China was characterized by shallow marine carbonate platform. If the South China Block-Indochina Block collision occurred in the Triassic, it should have led to the development of an orogen (i.e. topographic high) and associated clastic sediment deposition by weathering. Therefore, the presence of a carbonate platform seems to record a relative tectonic quiescence. Given that the South China Block and the Indochina Block had amalgamated earlier, the Song Ma suture zone may be reactivated due to the collision between the Indochina block and the Qiangtang-Sibumasu terrane in the Triassic.

== Mineral resources ==
The most important mineral resources in the South China Block must be the rare earth element (REE). REEs have a very wide range of application. Nowadays, China accounts for more than 80% of the global REE production. A lot of weathering-related REE deposits are found in South China such as the Zudong deposit and the Guposhan deposit in Jiangxi and Guangxi province respectively.

When the rare earth element-enriched felsic magma cools down to become rock, intense weathering of the rock further concentrates the rare earth element deposit. Therefore, the property of magma and the weathering intensity is the key to concentrate the rare earth element deposits. In South China, 75% of these deposits were derived from granitic and volcanic rocks during the Jurassic to the early Cretaceous. Therefore, the Yanshanian Movement represents one of the vital geological events in South China.

== Marine reptile fossil record ==
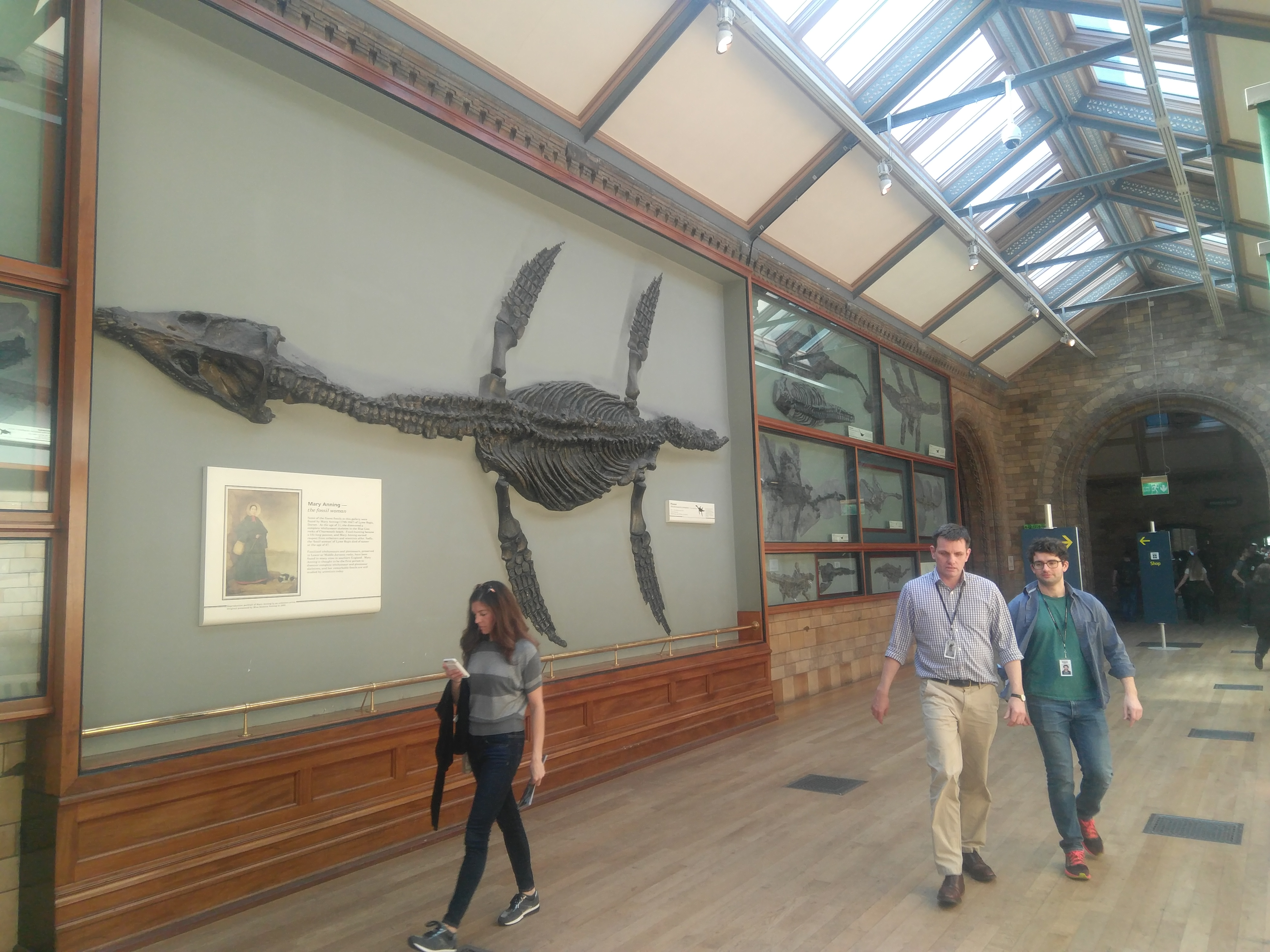
Ichthyosaur fossil at the Natural History Museum, London

Almost all known clades of Triassic marine reptile fossil have been recovered in the South China. They are apex predators. Their presence indicates that a complex food web had been established.

The Permian-Triassic Mass extinction is the largest extinction event in the Earth. Nearly 90% of marine species and 70% of land species became extinct.

The timing of recovery in marine ecosystem from this event is controversial. The discovery of the oldest marine reptile fossil (248.81 million years ago), which is collected from Chaohu, South China, suggests that marine ecosystem recovered rapidly after the mass extinction.

== See also ==
- China University of Geosciences
- Chinese Academy of Geological Sciences
- Chinese Geological Formations
- Columbia
- Detrital zircon geochronology
- North China Craton
- Rodinia
