= Huangling Complex =

The Huangling Complex may refer to:

- Mausoleum of the Yellow Emperor, a tomb complex located in Huangling County, Yan'an Prefecture, Shaanxi, China
- Ming Huangling, the tomb complex of the parents of the Hongwu Emperor of the Ming, posthumously elevated to imperial status
- Huangling Anticline, some rocks
