= Huangling Anticline =

Group of rock units in the Yangtze Block, South China

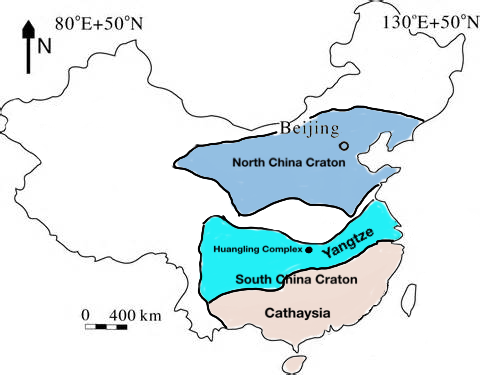
Location of the Huangling Anticline

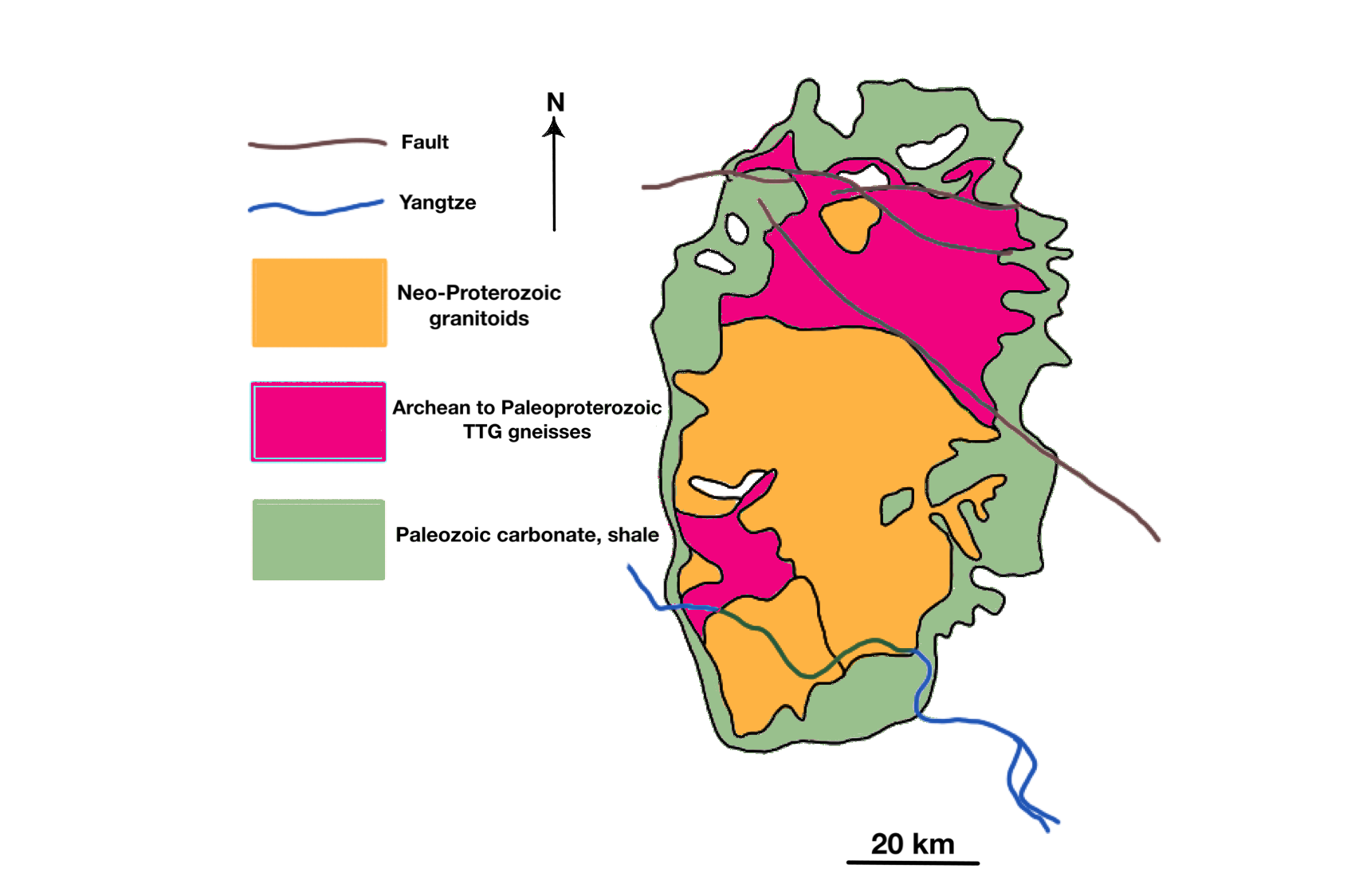
Huangling Stratigraphy showing Neo-Proterozoic granitoids, Archean to Paleoproterozoic TTG gneisses and Paleozoic carbonate, shale outlying the dome.

The Huangling Anticline or Complex represents a group of rock units that appear in the middle of the Yangtze Block in South China, distributed across Yixingshan, Zigui, Huangling, and Yichang counties. The group of rock involves nonconformity that sedimentary rocks overlie the metamorphic basement. It is a 73-km long, asymmetrical dome-shaped anticline with axial plane orientating in the north-south direction. It has a steeper west flank and a gentler east flank. Basically, there are three tectonic units from the anticline core to the rim, including Archean to Paleoproterozoic metamorphic basement, Neoproterozoic to Jurassic sedimentary rocks, and Cretaceous fluvial deposit sedimentary cover. The northern part of the core is mainly tonalite-trondhjemite-gneiss (TTG) and Cretaceous sedimentary rock called the Archean Kongling Complex. The middle of the core is mainly the Neoproterozoic granitoid. The southern part of the core is the Neoproterozoic potassium granite. Two basins are situated on the western and eastern flanks of the core, respectively, including the Zigui basin and Dangyang basin. Both basins are synforms while Zigui basin has a larger extent of folding. Yuanan Graben and Jingmen Graben are found within the Dangyang Basin area. The Huangling Anticline is an important area that helps unravel the tectonic history of the South China Craton because it has well-exposed layers of rock units from Archean basement rock to Cretaceous sedimentary rock cover due to the erosion of the anticline.

== Lithological units ==
The geology time range of Huangling Anticline is from the Archean to Mesozoic Cretaceous. The overlying rocks are sedimentary rock from the Neoproterozoic to Cretaceous. Here, three lithological units will be introduced.

=== I. Archean Kongling Complex with Neoproterozoic Huangling igneous intrusion ===
==== a) Archean Kongling Complex ====
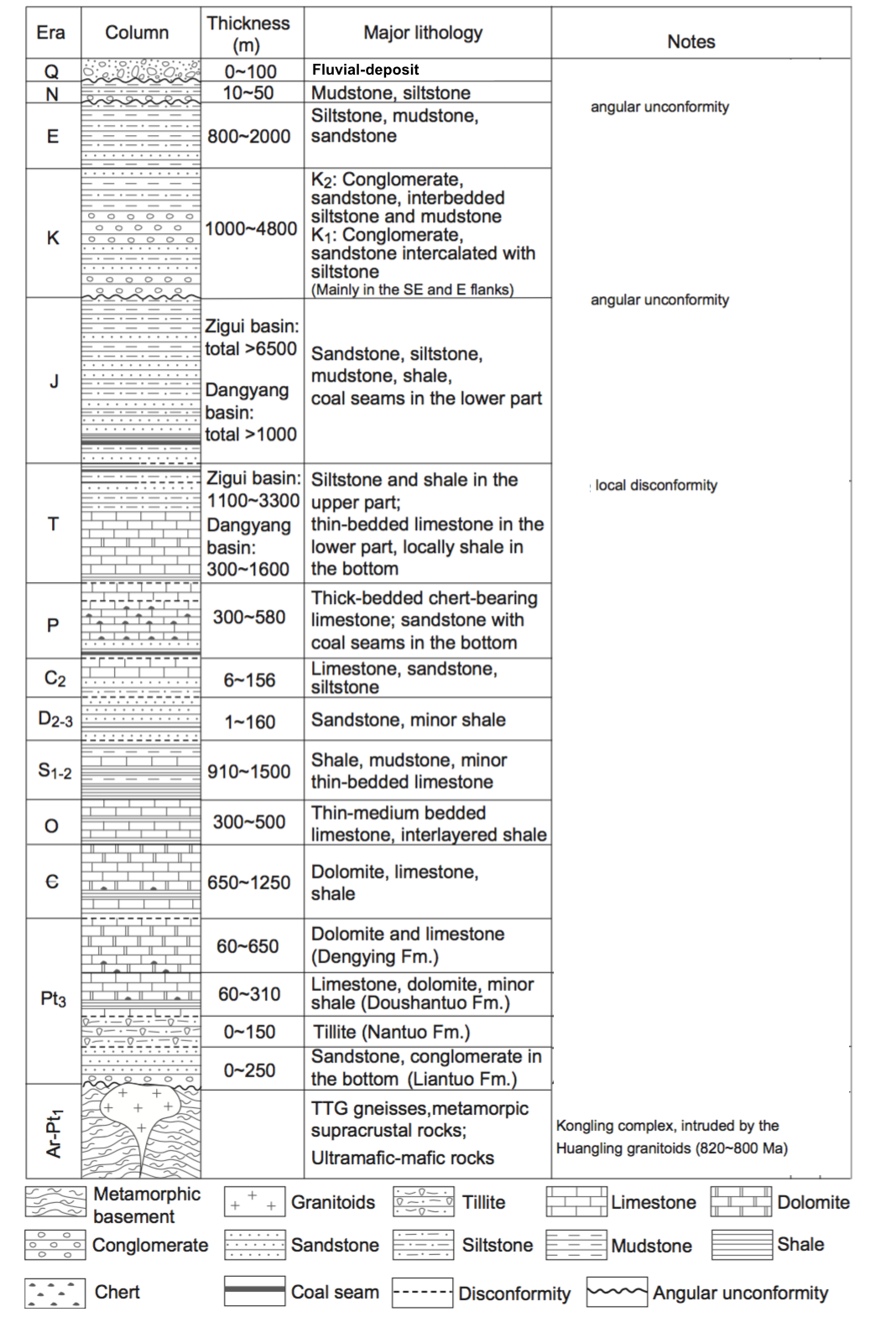
Stratigraphic column of the Huangling Anticline

The Archean metamorphic rock was intruded by magma in the Neoproterozoic. It forms the core which exhibits an asymmetric dome-shape trending in a north-south direction. The basement rock found in the northern part of the dome is called the Archean Kongling Complex. Magma intrusion made the northeastern part of the dome to be the Neoproterozoic granite. During Archean, the Kongling Complex experienced three periods of magmatic activities that shaped the base of the Huangling Anticline. The oldest rock, the Kongling Complex, dated with zircon was formed 3.2–3.3 Ga dated. The oldest part of the formation does not show much exposure. The rocks formed a bit later, at 2.9 Ga, are widespread. The widespread old metamorphic basement rocks are TTG gneisses and trondhjemitic gneiss; they are well-exposed. To the east of the Huangling Anticline, granitic and granodioritic schists can be found; they were formed at 2.7 Ga.

At the northeastern tip of the Archean Kongling area, there is a group of quartz schist, formed 2.8–3.0 Ga, during the magmatic activity in Kongling area, called the Yangpo Group. It appears as a metamorphic band trending north-northeast in Hubei province. Granitic intrusion dated 2.6 Ga was also found.

==== b) Neoproterozoic Huangling igneous intrusion ====
During the Neoproterozoic (825 Ma), Kongling Complex was intruded by granitic magma. The main resultant rock types include TTG gneisses, granitic gneiss such as granodiorite, diorite and monzogranite, and metamorphosed sedimentary rocks such as marble and quartzite. Minerals in metamorphic rocks such as garnet and sillimanite are found in a large area. Dehydration melting of biotite and granulite can be found, indicating the peak metamorphic temperature and pressure can be over 750–900 °C and 0.55–1.1 GPa, respectively. The granitic magma mixed both I- and S-type of granitoids; these two different magmatic compositions imply that there are different sources of magma, including new magma from mantle plume and partial melting of pre-existing crust.

In TTG, there are tonalities and tondhjemite. However, tonalities and trondhjemites are different; they are mainly composed of mafic and felsic minerals, respectively. They were formed by partial melting of pre-existing crust. Tonalities were formed in Neoproterozoic, by partial melting of the Yangtze Craton during subduction beneath the North China Craton. As the oceanic Yangtze Craton subducted under the continental North China Craton, magmatic activities resulted in the formation of hydrated mafic basaltic magma. On the other hand, trondhjemites were formed in Archean, with the source from partial melting of Archean amphibolites and granulites under the continental Yangtze Craton in a high-pressure condition. They are composed of felsic minerals such as plagioclase, quartz, and Na-K-rich feldspar and minor mafic minerals biotite and hornblende. The ultramafic-mafic rocks exhibit a band within the K-feldspar-rich granites. The K-feldspar-rich granites are found in the southwestern of the Huangling Anticline.

=== II. Neoproterozoic to Jurassic sedimentary rocks ===
The Neoproterozoic to Jurassic sedimentary rocks are overlying the Archean basement. From oldest to youngest, seven sedimentary strata can be identified:

1. Neoproterozoic sandstone of Liantuo Formation,
2. Early Paleozoic tillite of Nantuo Formation,
3. Late Paleozoic carbonate rocks of Doushantuo and Denying Formations,
4. Cambrian to Triassic carbonate and siliciclastic rocks,
5. Jurassic clastic rocks
6. Cretaceous clastic rocks

Angular nonconformities of strata were found between Archean basement and Early Paleozoic sandstone, Jurassic and Cretaceous terrigeneous deposit, and Eocene and Neogene siltstone.

In the Early Paleozoic, sandstone and conglomerate of Liantuo Formation experienced tectonic uplift due to the pushing of rock materials from below. At 650 Ma, global cooling led to the Snowball Earth. The angular, coarse-grained, poor-sorted glacial deposit, called tillite, was deposited. Until the end of Triassic, the Huangling Anticline was a marine environment and formed dolomite and limestone. Later on, the deposition environment switched from marine to continental, sedimentary facies also changed. On top of the marine deposits, terrigenous deposits such as sandstone, conglomerate, siltstone, and mudstone overly. Extensional geological settings like the foreland basin and rift basin settings are found, Zigui Basin and Danyang Basin, which are the two sedimentary basins lying on the western and eastern flank of Huangling dome, were formed during Late Triassic and Jurassic. It shows there were crustal extension during Mesozoic.

=== III. Cenozoic red iron-oxide beds ===
The Cenozoic fluvial deposits, including sandstone, siltstone, and mudstone, are iron oxides-rich, so they appear as red. They formed the basins and grabens on dome flanks. It shows there were extensional settings during Cenozoic.

== Relation of geometry and tectonic processes of the Huangling Anticline ==
Huangling massif exhibits an asymmetric dome shape striking to the north-south orientation. The north and south sides of the Huangling Anticline dip gently while the basins on the eastern flank and western flank of the dome have different dip angles. Zigui Basin, which is to the west of the Huangling Anticline, dips moderately at 40° westward. Dangyang Basin, which is to the east of the Huangling Anticline, in contrast, dips gently at 15° eastward. The reason of asymmetric folding will be discussed in the later part. Besides, a large number of recumbent folds trending N-S can be found on Zigui Basin and Dangyang Basin. They extrude to the west and to the east, respectively. During Late Jurassic to Early Cretaceous, there was a compressive environment causing the uplift of Huangling massif and folding in the Huangling Anticline. The exhumation of Huangling massif and formation of recumbent folds, plus vertical crustal shortening, occurred at the same time. After the uplift of Huangling dome during Triassic, the environment changed to extensional. Brittle deformation forming rifts and grabens followed. High-angle normal faulting can be found in Yuanan Graben and Jingmen Graben on the east side of the Huangling Anticline.

== Tectonic history ==
=== Origin (northern Huangling Anticline) ===
The oldest zircon in trondhjemitic gneiss in Kongling Complex was dated to be 3.3 Ga within the Archean Era. It was derived from the pre-existing continental crust. Metamorphism occurred at 2.9 Ga and 2.7 Ga. A large number of rock samples can be dated back to 2.9 Ga, indicating a large-scale metamorphism happened at that time and that event affects the geology of the whole South China.

=== Paleoproterozoic uplift ===
The Huangling Anticline was once uplifted in the Paleoproterozoic at 1.8–2 Ga. High-pressure rocks were found in Kongling area. They record Paleoproterozoic metamorphism and magmatism. At that time, the break-up of the supercontinent Columbia caused crustal divergence of the North China Craton and the South China Craton. The crustal thinning reduced the weight. In order to balance the thinned crust, the magma down below rose up to fill up the thinned part. Tectonic uplift of the Kongling area was the result.

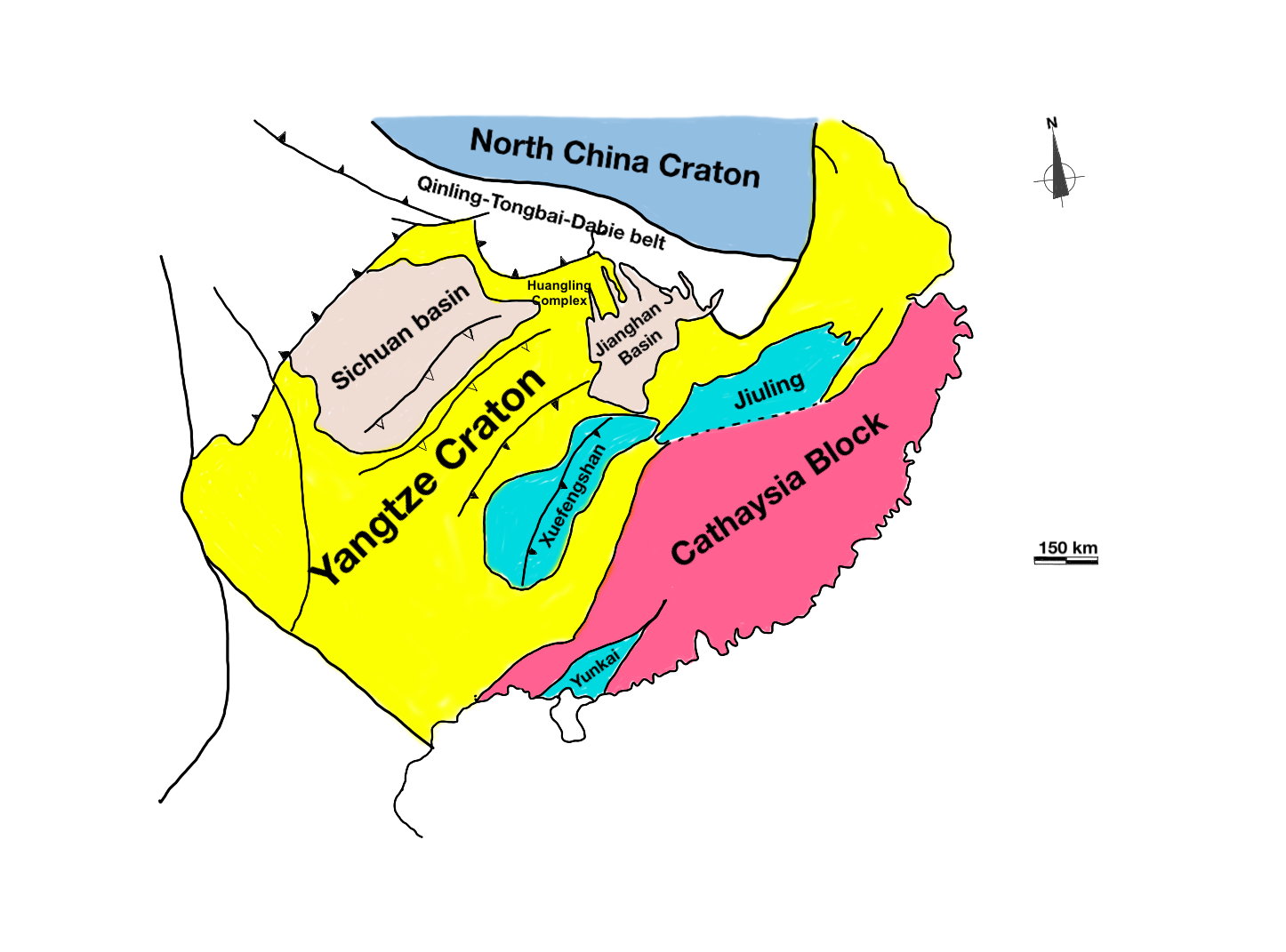
A map of the South China Craton showing its constituent. It comprises the Yangtze Craton and Cathaysia Craton. The Huangling Anticline lies in the middle area. During the Neoproterozic, continental collision formed many belts around it.

=== Neoproterozoic continental collision and igneous intrusion ===
At the time, when the supercontinent Rodinia formed in the Neoproterozoic around 1 Ga, the South China Craton joined with the North China Craton again. There was a collision between the Yangtze Block and Cathaysia Block in the South China Craton. Upon the collision of plates, the northern part of the Huangling Anticline underwent orogenic uplift and ductile deformation. The ductile deformed feature mylonitic belts can be found in the area. They have strong lineation striking to NEE and SWW. While on the southwestern side of Huangling massif, the lineation orientation changes to WNW and ESE.

During the Neoproterozoic, the South China Craton was intruded by magma. The mantle plume is related to the Supercontinent Rodinia breakup at 825 Ma due to isostasy, which is related to the crustal thinning. A 1000 km-large igneous intrusion located below the South China Craton was exhumated. The mantle plume separated the South China Craton and Australia. Evidence includes the ultramafic rock types found in dikes in these two separate places having the same origin, showing South China Craton and Australia were once united. The presence of Qingling complexes lying between the North China Craton and South China Craton is the resultant passive margin formed after the continental break-up. Continental uplift and cooling of Huangling massif followed after the intrusion.

=== Early Mesozoic continental subduction ===
In the Early Mesozoic, as the South China Craton subducted beneath the North China Craton, the accumulation of continental material facilitated orogenic belt forming at the collision area. Examples include the Qinling-Tongbai-Dabie belt, Longmenshan thrust belt, and Indochina belt. The Xuefengshan-Jiuling belt lying in the middle of the South China Craton also formed due to the compressive force. Huangling massif was quite stable because its location in the middle of the South China Craton was shielded from the uplift orogenic events at the rim.

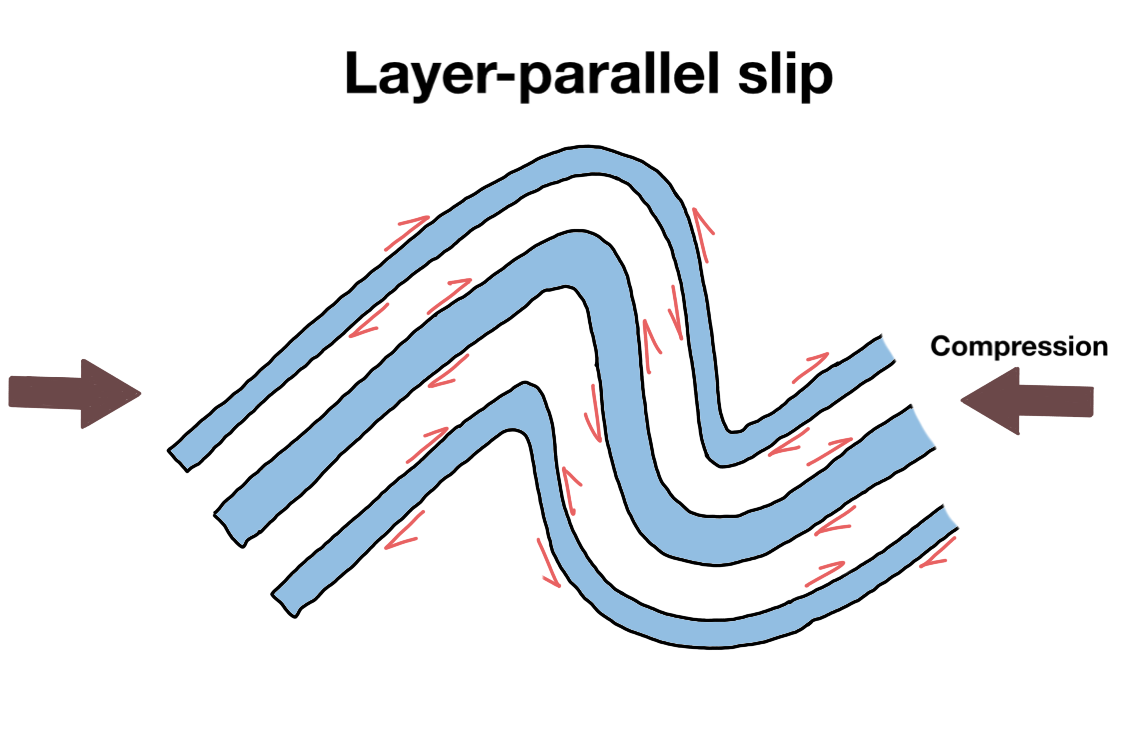
Layer-parallel slip during flexural folding

=== Middle Mesozoic formation of dome-shaped anticline ===
Not until the Late Jurassic to Early Cretaceous did Huangling massif uplift. This period was critical for the tectonic development of Huangling massif since the dome-shaped structure was formed. The dome-shaped structure indicated a compressional environment. The dome has a steeper west flank and a gentle east flank, indicating the compressive stress exerted to the west and to the east were different. Coevally, recumbent folds trending north-south overturning to the west and east on the western and eastern flanks respectively, and layer-parallel slip were formed. In the next session, different models suggesting the kinematics of the dome-shaped structure will be further discussed.

=== Late Mesozoic eastern Eurasia extension ===
Late Mesozoic crustal thinning created normal faulting associated with rifts and grabens. The Cretaceous growth strata formed during deformation had non-uniform thickness of beds.

In the Late Mesozoic, the thinning of the eastern Eurasia produced extensional features such as high-angle faults, rifts, grabens, drag-folds, and exposed the metamorphic basement core. The high-angle normal faults are associated with grabens formation.

The deformed strata caused the growth strata that was depositing at the same time to have uneven strata thickness, resulting in the Cretaceous strata superposed on grabens being thicker, while that on horsts were thinner. During Late Mesozoic, the slap angle subduction of Paleo-Pacific plate beneath the southeastern China changed. It increased with time, so the magmatic activity moved its place towards the South China Sea. This activity formed volcanic rocks in South China.

== Formation of a dome-shaped Huangling massif ==
The formation of the Haungling dome is still unknown. There are three evolutionary models established, including those driven by both compressive and extensional forces.

=== Westward extrusion model ===
- During Lower Late Jurassic to Upper Cretaceous, the intracontinental belt, namely the Qinling-Tongbai-Dabie belt and Xuefengshan-Jiuling belt to the north and south of Huangling massif, respectively, thrust over it. They squeezed Huangling massif to the west. An asymmetric ramp anticline trending north-south with steeper western slope and gentler eastern slope was formed. Evidence of thrust deformation can be found in the northern and southern rim of the Huangling dome.

Western Extrusion Model	Fold-thrust belt

=== Eastward extrusion model ===
- During Lower Mesozoic, the northern notch of Qinling-Dabie belt and the clockwise rotation of the Sichuan Basin squeezed Huangling massif to escape to the east, forming an asymmetric ramp anticline trending N-S with steeper eastern flank and gentler western flank. Controversy arose that the eastern flank of the anti-dome is steeper than the western flank, which is not fitting the geometry of the Huangling Anticline.

Eastern Extrusion Model	Eastward thrusting of Huangling massif associated with basal decollement

=== Crustal Extension Uplift Model ===
- During Lower Mesozoic, eastern China experienced crustal thinning. Regional extension caused isostatic rebound of the crust, resulting in exhumation and slightly tilting to the west of the Huangling Anticline. A series of ductile and brittle deformation features were formed, such as drag-folds, as well as horsts and grabens.

The Extensional Uplift Model formed the Huangling anti-dome and high-angle normal faults around it
