= Qinling orogenic belt =

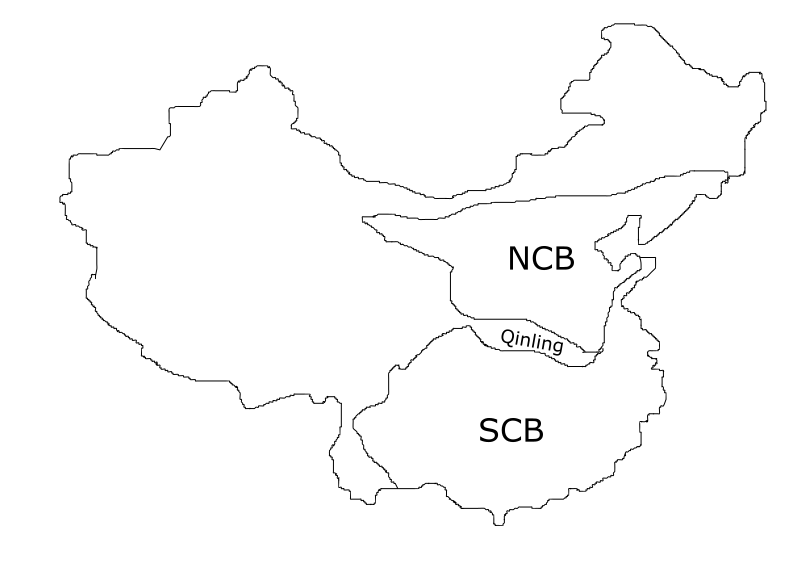
Location of Qinling between the North China Block (NCB) and South China Block (SCB)

The Qinling orogenic belt is a tectonic feature that evolved throughout the Proterozoic and Phanerozoic eons due to a variety of tectonic activities. It is a part of the Central China Orogenic Belt, aligned in an east–west orientation across Central China, and spans portions of Shaanxi, Henan and Gansu provinces along the Qinling Mountains which are one of the greatest mountain ranges in China. The first materials involved in the Qinling orogenic belt formed around 2.5 billion years ago, whereas the main morphology of the belt now largely reflects the Triassic collision between the North China Plate and the South China Plate and Cenozoic extension across China. During these 2.5 billion years, various types of rocks have been formed here due to different tectonic processes and chemical reactions between rocks. Therefore, geologists are able to reconstruct the evolution of mountain belt based on evidence preserved in these rocks.

== Tectonic evolution ==
Throughout the long history of the evolution of Qinling orogenic belt, there were several cycles of plate collisions and plate separations together with ocean openings and closures occurred. The process is known as a Wilson Cycle. The Qinling orogenic belt was formed largely because of the movements of North China Block and Yangtze Block of the South China Plate.

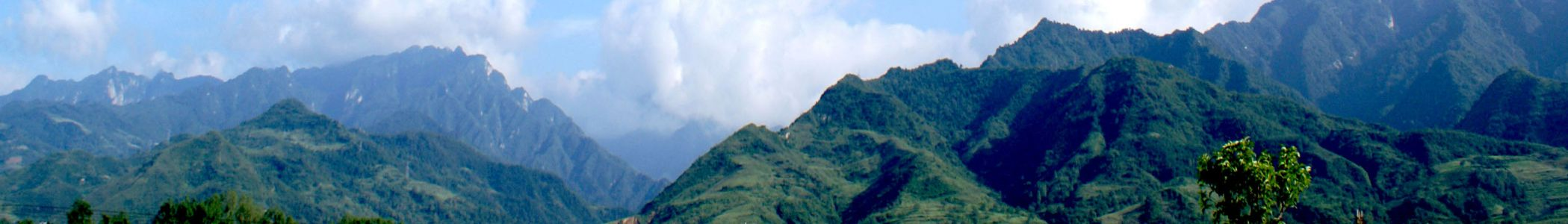
View of mountain ranges within Qinling belt

The Qingling orogenic belt can be divided into two major regions, the North Qinling Belt and the South Qingling belt, which are located at the boundary of the southern North China Craton and the northern South China Craton respectively. The most interesting thing about the evolution of Qinling orogenic belt is the multiple individual micro-block interactions. The tectonic evolution of the whole Qinling belt was not a single event but a combination of several collisional and extensional events, which mainly includes 4 phases:

1. Development of basement of the belt (2.5 billion years to 800 million years ago)
2. Evolution of plates and associated ocean basin (800 to 250 million years ago)
3. Major belt formation (orogeny) (250 to 140 million years ago)
4. Extension and stretching of the belt (140 million years before to the present)

Notes about orogenic belt
Orogenic belt or orogen means a tectonic belt that was formed when rocks and sediments are piled up due to the compressional force exerted by two colliding tectonic plates. Sediments and rocks located on the top of the subducting plate will be pushed and piled up by another plate (overriding plate). Meanwhile, rocks that belong to the overriding plate are also commonly deformed along the plate margin. Eventually, as the two plates continue colliding, the rocks will develop into a mountain chain, the geology of which is called orogen or orogenic belt. The whole process is termed orogeny.

=== Development of basement of belt (2.5 billion years to 800 million years ago) ===
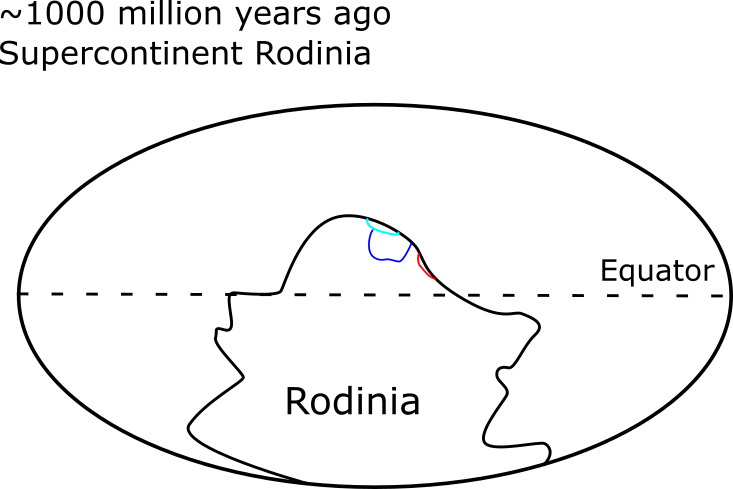
Qinling belt and South China block at supercontinent Rodinia Area in light blue: approximate location of South Qinling belt Area in dark blue: approximate location of South China block Area in red: approximate location of North Qinling belt. Modify from Yu et al., 2015

At the beginning of the Qinling rock record (around 2.5 billion years ago), the North Qinling belt and South Qinling belt were not initially formed together at the same location at the same time. The South Qinling belt was formed by continental magmatic activities 2.5 billion years ago. Then, magma cooled down and became rocks which contribute to the major basement of the South Qinling belt. On the other hand, the North Qinling belt was formed later. It was first formed 1000 million years ago by magmatic activities which occurred in an oceanic-arc environment.

During the early Neoproterozoic (1000 million years ago), the North Qinling belt and the South Qinling were aligned along the same subducting plate boundary at the Northeastern part of super-continent Rodinia (an extremely large tectonic plate composed of different smaller plates). During subduction, the South China block overrode an oceanic plate was compressed and South Qinling belt first formed on a small scale.

On the other hand, the formation of North Qinling belt was more complicated. It did not initially exist with North China Block, but a part of supercontinent Rodinia. At the subducting plate boundary, it collided with Rodinia and was folded up forming North Qinling Belt.

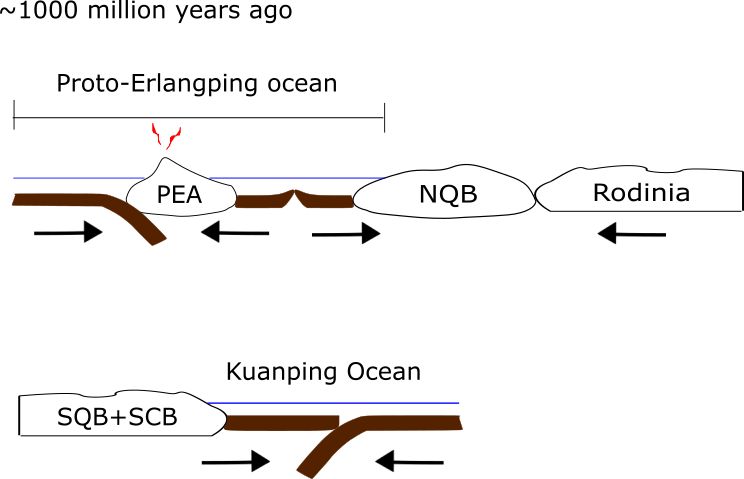
Diagram showing plate evolution 1000 million years ago SCB: South China Block NQB: North Qinling Block SQB: South Qinling Block PEA: Proto-Erlangpng Arc. Modify from Yu et al., 2015

In addition, at some distances further away from the North Qinling Belt, a continental arc with volcanoes was formed at another subducting plate boundary as well, which is named the Proto-Erlangping arc. An arc can be formed because the subducted lower plate melted in the mantle and rose up to the opposite upper plate while cutting through lines of weakness of plate. As a result, magma eventually reached the top of the plate, then cooled down and solidified into rocks, forming an arc. In the meantime, Proto-Erlangping ocean was created at divergent plate boundary where plates separate, so that the Proto-Erlangping arc was moving away from North Qinling belt.

=== Evolution of belt and associated ocean (800 to 250 million years ago) ===
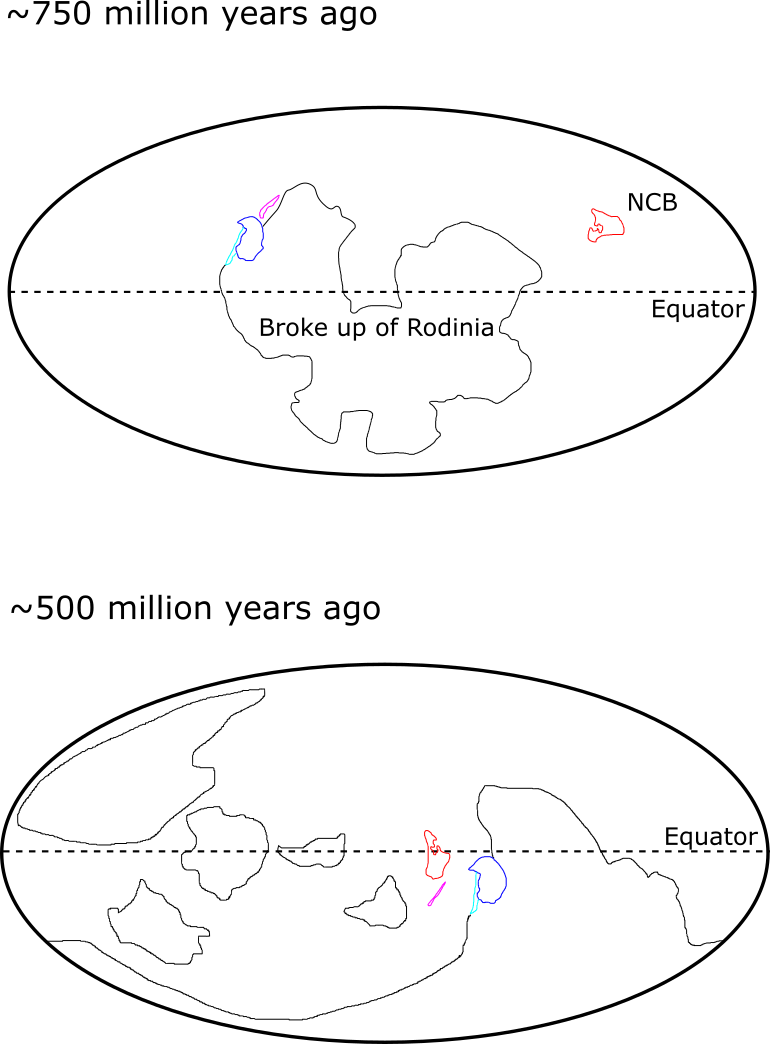
Location of Qinling belt, North and South China block at different time Area in light blue: approximate location of South Qinling belt; Area in dark blue: approximate location of South China block; Area in purple: approximate location of North Qinling belt; Area in red: approximate location of North China block. Modify from Yu et al., 2015

Later on in the middle Neoproterozoic (around 750 million years ago), the supercontinent containing Proto-Erlangping arc, North Qinling Belt and South Qinling Belt was broken up. The two belts were transported to another place together. The oceanic part of South China block was broken and separated into two parts creating the Shangdan ocean. This is because divergent convection magma dominated at that period, when two parts separate, magma rise up from the gap of them creating a larger oceanic plate (as well as an ocean). On the other end of the oceanic plate, it collided with another oceanic plate coincidently. An island arc called 'DanFeng island arc' was formed.

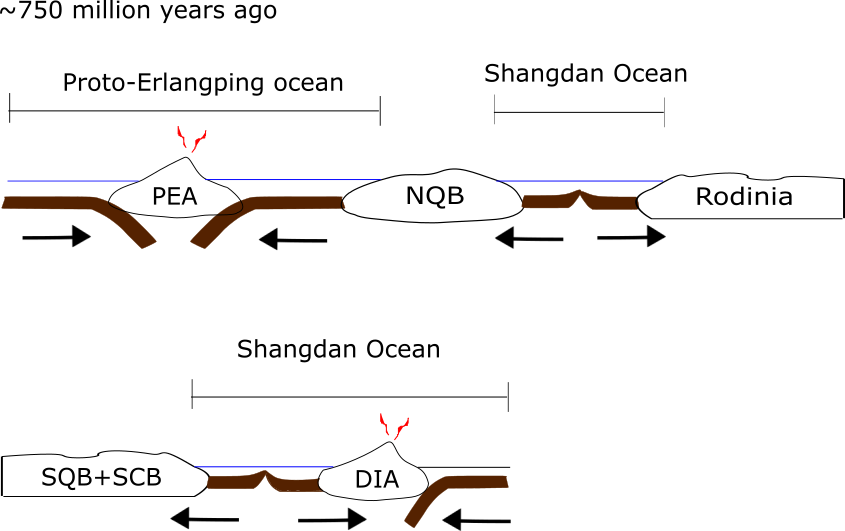
Diagram showing plate evolution 750 million years ago SCB: South China Block NQB: North Qinling Block SQB: South Qinling Block PEA: Proto-Erlangpng Arc DIA: Danfeng Intra-oceanic island arc. Modify from Yu et al., 2015

A similar process occurred at the North Qinling belt, North Qinling belt and Rodinia were separated. As a result, a new ocean formed as well. At this time North and South Qinling belt were still aligning next to each other, therefore they shared the same Shangdan ocean. By the time the North Qinling Belt moved away from Rodinia, it was colliding with the Proto-Erlangping arc as well. Therefore, two subduction processes occurred at the same time at the Proto-Erlangping arc.

At the early Cambrian (around 540 million years ago), Gondwana (considered as super-continent by some geologists) started to develop. The North and South Qinling Belt were located at the Northeastern part of it. This was the time when North China Block first met the North Qinling belt, locating at the other end of Proto-Erlangping arc. During that period, the North Qinling belt was no longer located next to South Qinling belt, but facing it. As same as the situation before Cambrian, the North Qingling belt and South Qinling Belt still share the Shangdan ocean. What different was the subducting plate changed from one to another, at the Danfeng island.

At late Cambrian (around 500 million years ago), the North China block migrated closer to North Qinling block. Consequently, the Proto-Erlangping ocean was closed as the whole oceanic plate had subducted to the mantle. This also implies the North Qinling belt collided with Proto-Erlangping belt after the closure of the ocean.

From the late Ordovician to late Silurian (460 to 420 million years), the collided North Qinling belt and Proto-Erlangping belt were moved to a magma spreading centre, which split plates apart by divergent convection magma. This turn out the Erlangping ocean was opened again.

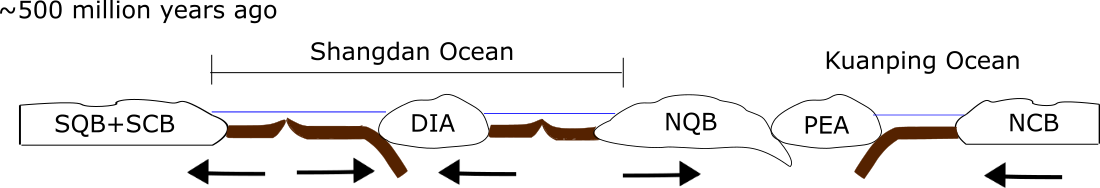
Diagram showing plate evolution 500 million years ago SCB: South China Block NCB: North China Block NQB: North Qinling Block SQB: South Qinling Block PEA: Proto-Erlangpng Arc DIA: Danfeng Intra-oceanic island arc. Modify from Yu et al., 2015

At the early Devonian (around 400 million years ago), South Qinling belt and North China block moved towards each other, while extensive convergent convection magma occurred, although some geologists claimed it happened between 320 and 300 million years before. As a result, Erlangping arc, North Qinling belt, South Qinling belt and North China block all collided together. With all oceans closed up and blocks moving towards each other, rocks were then piled up within blocks. Meanwhile, Mianlue ocean was opened, since South China block and the rest of the block complex were separated by divergent convection magma current. The ocean created is also regarded as back-arc basin.

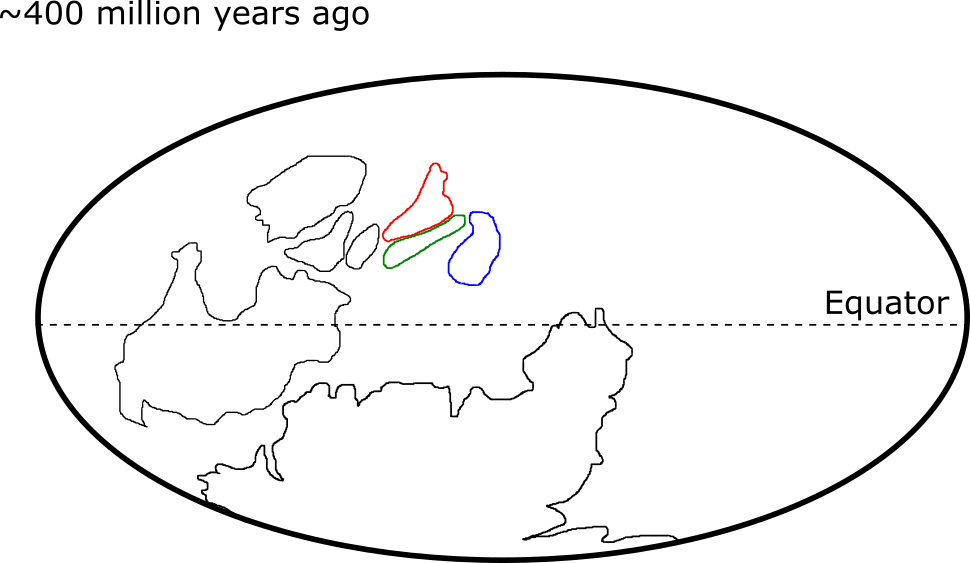
Location of Qinling belt, North and South China Block Area in Blue: approximate location of South China Block Area in Red: approximate location of North China Block Area in Green: approximate location of Qinling orogenic belt Modify from Dong and Santosh, 2016

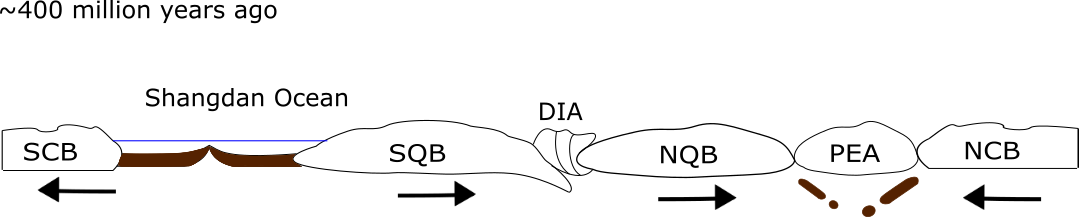
Diagram showing plate evolution 400 million years ago SCB: South China Block NCB: North China Block NQB: North Qinling Block SQB: South Qinling Block PEA: Proto-Erlangpng Arc DIA: Danfeng Intra-oceanic island arc. Modify from Dong et al., 2011.

During the middle Mississippian (around 300 million years ago), the Mianlue ocean stopped spreading. The South China Plate moved towards the Qinling complex and North China Block. The oceanic part of South China Block subducted to the mantle and the ocean started closing.

=== Major belt formation (250 to 140 million years ago) ===
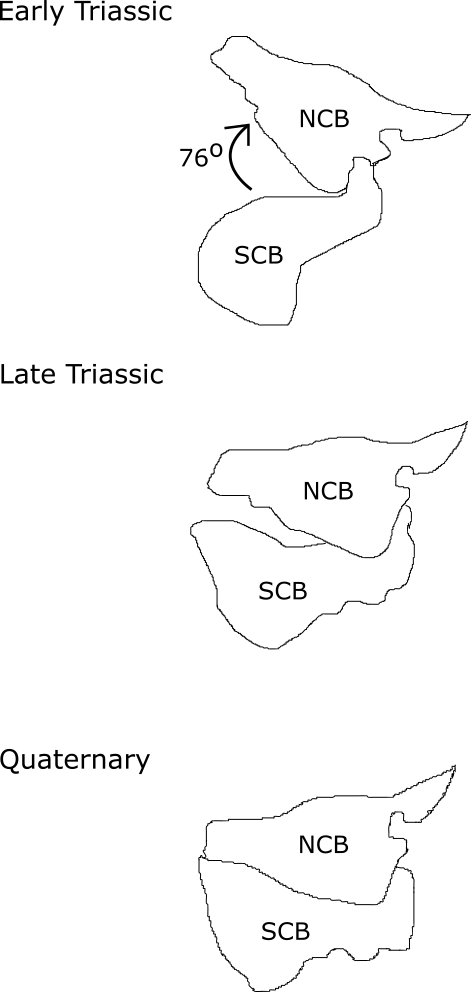
Rotational motion of South China craton at Triassic period. Modified from Chen and Santosh, 2014

At the early Triassic (around 250 million years ago), the South China block finally collided with Qinling complex, and the continent-continent collision occurred. Accordingly, the Mianlue ocean eventually closed completely. Resulting from extremely strong compressional force, all individual blocks were shortened horizontally but thickened vertically. At middle Jurassic (174-163 million years ago), the South China block subducted beneath the South Qinling block and part of the plate broke off to the subduction zone.

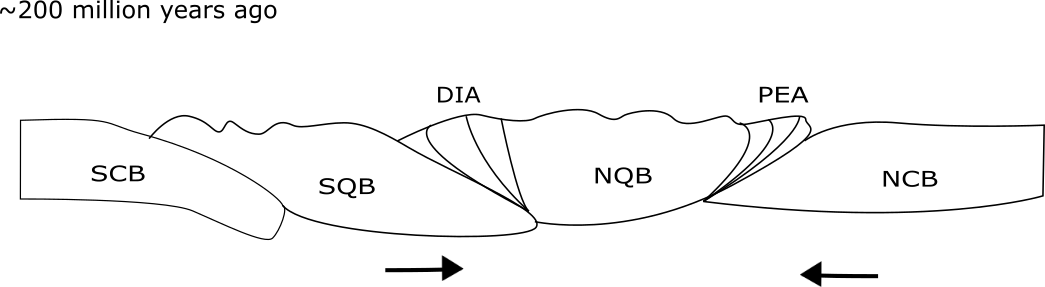
Diagram showing plate evolution 200 million years ago SCB: South China Block NCB: North China Block NQB: North Qinling Block SQB: South Qinling Block PEA: Proto-Erlangpng Arc DIA: Danfeng Intra-oceanic island arc. Modify from Dong et al., 2011

However, the collisional event was different from normal one. It is because the South China Plate collided to the North China plate with a relatively rotational motion. Such that the eastern part of Qinling belt was compressed earlier than the western part.

=== Extension and stretching of belt (140 million years ago to the present) ===
Starting from 140 million years (Cretaceous) before to the present, the tectonic activities changed from collisional to extensional, which is a process of crustal stretching resulting in crustal thinning. Until the late Cretaceous (83 million years ago), the Qinling complex was affected by a WNW-ESE extension event in west of Qinling. As a result, right-lateral strike slip fault became dominated. At Mid-Eocene to Early Oligocene (45 to 24 million years ago), normal fault dominated the complex back due to extensional event at the northern part. Until the late Oligocene to early Miocene (24 to 14 million years ago), left-lateral strike-slip fault became the major deformation feature in Qinling. However, at the late Miocene (9 million years ago), normal fault replaced left-lateral strike-slip fault because of a NE-SW extensional event caused by rifting until the late Pliocene. At the late Pliocene (3.5 million years ago), left-lateral strike-slip fault dominated the Qinling, which was caused by a NNW-SSE extension event until the Present.

Time period	Type of fault	Reason
Early Cretaceous to late Cretaceous (140 to 83 million years ago).	Normal fault.	Crustal extension.
Late Cretaceous to Mid-Eocene (83 to 45 million years ago)	Right-lateral strike-slip fault	Extensional event at the north west of Qinling
Mid-Eocene to Early Oligocene (45 to 24 million years ago)	Normal fault	Extensional event at the northern part of Qinling
Late Oligocene to Early Miocene (24 to 14 million years ago)	Left-lateral strike-slip fault	Extensional event at the north east of Qinling
Late Miocene to Early Pliocene (14 to 9 million years ago)	Normal fault	Rifting subsidence at the north
Early Pliocene to late Pliocene (9 to 3.5 million years ago)	Unknown	Unknown
Late Pliocene to the Present (3.5 million years ago to the Present)	Left-lateral strike-slip fault	Extensional event at the north east of Qinling

== Geology of Qinling ==
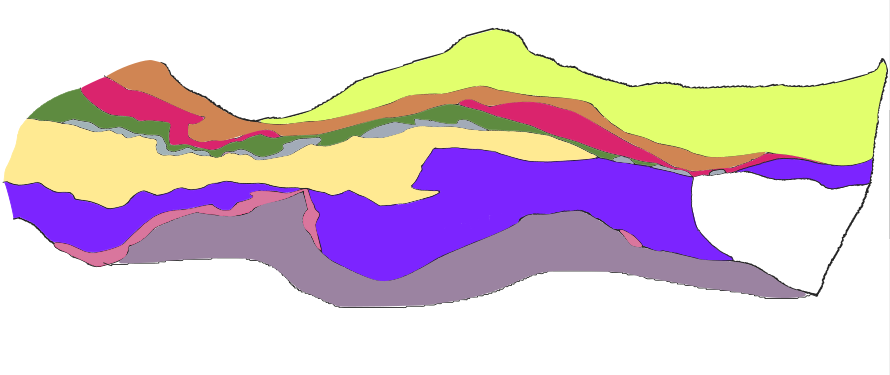
Geological map of Qinling Pale green area: South-North China Block Brown area: Kuanping group Pink area: Erlangping group Dark green area: North Qingling Block Light blue area: Shangdan suture zone Beige area: North-South Qinling Belt Dark blue area: South-South Qingling Belt Pinkish purple area: Mianlue suture zone Grey area: North-South China Block White area: Dabie terrane Modify from Dong et al., 2011

The geology of Qinling is complex which is formed due to many tectonic activities and multiple crustal block interactions. It can be divided into 9 main groups: South-North China Block, Kuanping Group, Erlangping Group, North Qingling Block, Shangdan suture zone, North-South Qinling Block, South-South Qinling Block, Mianlue Suture zone and Dabie terrane.

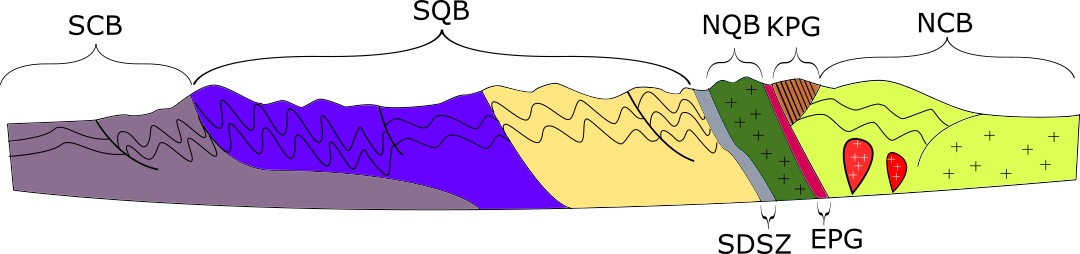
Geological cross-section of Qingling Orogenic belt NCB: North China Block KPG: Kuanping Group EPG: Erlangping Group NQB: North Qinling Belt SDSZ: Shangdan suture zone SQB: South Qinling Belt SCB: South China Block Curve line: sedimentary strata Cross sign: basement rock Red area with white crosses: intrusive pluton. Modify from Dong et al., 2011

=== South-North China Block ===
At the northern edge of Qinling orogenic belt, it is attached to the North China Block, which comprises mainly basement rocks formed 3000 to 1000 million years ago. They were then overlaid by marine facies and tillite at the Proterozoic (1600–545 million years ago) and continental margin facies at Cambrian and Ordovician (545-492 million years ago). During Cretaceous (142–65.5 million years ago), various pluton intrusion (granitoid) were emplaced resulting from crustal blocks collision.

=== Kuanping Group ===
Further to the south, Kuanping group is dominated meta-sedimentary rock including greenschist, amphibolite and mica-schist, which were metamorphosed due to a collision between North China Block and Erlangping island arc. In addition, ophiolites were exposed to the earth surface by obduction. The Kuanping group was formed in the early to middle Proterozoic (2.5-1 billion years ago).

=== Erlangping Group ===
At the early Paleozoic (around 545–440 million years ago), the Erlangping island arc subducted beneath the North China Block (obduction), so that those arc-related ophiolite with mélange was moved to the surface of the earth. Within an ophiolite sequence, ultramafic rock, pillow basalt. sill basalt and a small amount of chert can be found.

=== North Qinling Group ===
The North Qinling Group, one of the major block that built up the Qinling orogen, is characterized by gneiss, amphibolite and marble which were metamorphosed from clastic sedimentary rock and carbonate. It was formed from early Proterozoic to early Paleozoic. The basement rocks were later covered by various clastic sedimentary rocks in the Carboniferous and Permian (354 to 250 million years ago).

=== Shangdan suture zone ===
The Shangdan suture zone is considered as the dividing boundary of the North and South Qinling Belt. It is composed of extensive ophiolite, clastic sedimentary rock and carbonate. Ophiolites were formed during early Cambrian to Early Silurian (545 to 423 million years ago). Series of volcanic rock including intrusive pluton, and sedimentary rock which indicates an island arc environment in the Early Paleozoic. This is explained by gabbroic and granitic intrusion within the suture zone, with the low amount of ultramafic rocks involved.

=== South Qinling Block ===
The South Qinling Block is comparatively larger than the North Qinling Block, which is further divided into two parts: North and South Qinling Belt. The North-South Qinling Belt involves Archean to Late Proterozoic basement rock, which can be dated back to 3.8 to 0.545 billion years ago. Limestone, Shale, sandstone and other sedimentary rocks were deposited on top of basement rocks at the Paleozoic (545–250 million years ago), with a minor amount of sandstone deposited until the Triassic period (205 million years ago). On the other hand, the geology of South-South Qinling Belt is mainly presented by precambrian (545 billion years ago) basement rock. Besides, the basement rocks were intruded by alkaline dyke in the Silurian. After that, since the North part of South Qinling belt was in a shallow marine environment, sedimentary facies reflecting the paleo-environment was formed. This included shale, turbidite and limestone. Starting from the late Triassic to Cretaceous, the sedimentary environment turned to a terrestrial setting. The terrestrial facies can be indicated by conglomerate and sandstone.

=== Mianlue suture zone ===
The Mianlue suture zone was evolved from Mianlue oceanic basin, which was closed at the Mid-Triassic and developed into suture zone. Therefore, ophiolite representing oceanic setting and volcanic rock indicating subduction zone was discovered there. As the ocean closed and blocks collided towards each other, basalts were metamorphosed into meta-basaltic rock. From data provided, rocks mentioned above can be dated back to 345 to 200 million years ago.

=== North-South China Block ===
The Northern part of South China Block contains one of the oldest rock complexes in China, which is Kongling complex from the Archean Eon. It is mainly composed highly metamorphosed rock, including amphibolite, migmatite, meta-sedimentary rock and TTG (trondhjemite-tonalite-granodiorite). At the north edge of the block, sedimentary rocks deposited before the collision. Limestone, shale, turbidite, siltstone and sandstone can be found in sedimentary strata. The various type of sedimentary rocks recorded means the sea level had changed a lot since Cambrian to Carboniferous.

Geological group	Major geology (rock type)	Formation time
South-North China Block	Basement rock; Marine facies; Tillite; Continental margin facies; Pluton intrusion	Late Archean–Late Proterozoic: Middle Proterozoic; Late Proterozoic; Cambrian–Ordovician; Cretaceous
Kuanping group	Metasedimentary rocks: greenschist, amphibolite, micaschist; Marble; Ophiolite	Early Proterozoic: Early Proterozoic; Middle Proterozoic
Erlangping group	Ophiolite Clastic sedimentary rock and carbonate	Early Paleozoic
North Qinling Block	Gneiss, amphibolite & marble; Clastic sedimentary rocks	Early Proterozoic and early Paleozoic; Carboniferous–Permian
Shangdan suture zone	Ophiolite; Volcanic and sedimentary rock	Early Cambrian–Early Silurian: Early Paleozoic
North-South Qinling Belt	Basement rock; Limestone; Shale; Sandstone	Archean - Late Proterozoic: Ordovician, Devonian - Carboniferous; Silurian; Late Permian–Triassic
South-South Qinling Belt	Basement rock with alkaline dyke intrusion; Shallow marine sedimentary facies; Terrestrial sedimentary facies	Precambrian (+Silurian): Proterozoic to Mid-Triassic; Late Triassic–Cretaceous
Mianlue suture zone	Ophiolite; Meta-basaltic rock; Volcanic rock	Early Carboniferous–Early Jurassic
North-South China Block	Basement rock (Kongling complex); Shallow marine carbonate; Carbonate + Black shale; Limestone; Shale + siltstone; Turbidite; Sandstone + limestone	Archean; Cambrian; Late Cambrian; Ordovician; Silurian; Devonian; Carboniferous
Cretaceous: 142–65.5 million years ago; Jurassic: 205–142 million years ago; Triassic: 250–205 million years ago; Permian: 292–250 million years ago; Carboniferous: 354–292 million years ago; Devonian: 417–354 million years ago; Silurian: 440–417 million years ago; Ordovician: 495–440 million years ago; Cambrian: 545–495 million years ago; Proterozoic: 2.5–0.545 billion years ago; Archean: 3.8–2.5 billion years ago

== See also ==
- Subduction
- Wilson Cycle
- Orogenic belt
- Plate tectonics
- Qinling
