= Yangtze plate =

Tectonic plate carrying the bulk of southern China

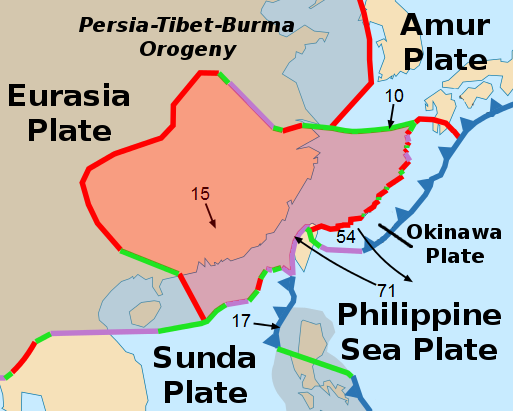
- Type: Minor
- Movement^{1}: south-east
- Speed^{1}: 15mm/year
- Features: China
- ^{1}Relative to the African plate

The Yangtze plate, also called the South China block or the South China subplate, comprises the bulk of southern China. It is separated on the east from the Okinawa plate by a rift that forms the Okinawa Trough which is a back-arc basin, on the south by the Sunda plate and the Philippine Sea plate, and on the north and west by the Eurasian plate. The Longmenshan Fault on the latter border was the site of the 2008 Wenchuan earthquake.

The Yangtze plate was formed by the disaggregation of the Rodinia supercontinent 750 million years ago, in the Neoproterozoic era. South China rifted away from the Gondwana supercontinent in the Silurian. During the formation of the great supercontinent Pangaea, South China was a smaller, separate continent located off the east coast of the supercontinent and drifting northward. In the Triassic, the Yangtze plate collided with the North China plate, thereby connecting with Pangaea, and formed the Sichuan basin. In the Cenozoic, the Yangtze plate was influenced by the collision of the Indian plate and Eurasian plate creating the uplifting of the Longmen Mountains. Its southward motion is accommodated along the Red River fault.
