= List of private military companies =

The following is a list of notable private military companies (PMCs).

== Africa ==
=== Angolan companies ===
- Teleservice (until 2002)

=== South African companies ===
- Executive Outcomes, (ceased operations on January 1, 1999; apparently restarted operations in November 2020)

== Americas ==
=== Peruvian companies ===
- Defion Internacional

=== US companies ===
| Name | HQ | Portfolio | Notes |
|---|---|---|---|
| AirScan | Titusville, FL | US Department of Defense, United States Air Force, and a number of private companies | |
| Academi | McLean, VA | | Consulting. Formerly known as Blackwater and Xe and it is part of the Triple Canopy. |
| American International Security Corp | Woburn, MA | | Dissolved |
| Custer Battles | McLean, VA | Iraq and oil sector (at present, have ceased operations in Iraq) | Dissolved |
| Jorge Scientific Corporation | Arlington, VA | | Consulting |
| KBR | Houston, TX | | Formerly a Division of Halliburton |
| MAG Aerospace | Fairfax, VA | | |
| MPRI, Inc. | Alexandria, VA | | |
| MVM, Inc. | Vienna, VA | CIA and NSA contractor | |
| Northbridge Services Group | Lexington, KY | | Advisory, Training, Operational Support, etc. |
| Titan Corporation | San Diego, CA | | Sold to L3 Communications in 2005 |
| Triple Canopy | Herndon, VA | South America, Iraq, Syria | It is part of the Constellis Group. |
| Vinnell Corporation | Fairfax, VA | Turkey, Saudi Arabia, Iraq | |
| Vectus Global | United States | Haiti, Democratic Republic of the Congo | Founded by Erik Prince, the original founder of Blackwater/Academi. |
| Raymond Associates LLC | Saratoga Springs, NY | UAE, Iraq, Romania | Close Protection Security Contract US American Generals Dempsey, Petraeus in Iraq |

== Asia ==
=== China ===
- Frontier Services Group

=== Turkish companies ===
- SADAT International Defense Consultancy (founded in 2012)
- Akademi Sancak (ACS) (founded in 2014)

== Europe ==
=== French companies ===
- GEOS

=== German companies ===
- Asgaard – German Security Group

=== Gibraltar companies ===
- STTEP, registered in Gibraltar, mainly uses former SANDF forces.

=== Polish companies ===
- European Security Academy

=== Russian companies ===
- E.N.O.T. Corp. (disbanded in 2019)
- Fakel
- Patriot
- Redut (Nationalised in 2022)
- Slavonic Corps (disbanded in 2013)
- Wagner Group (Nationalised in November 2023)

Ukrainian companies

- Omega Consulting Group

=== Spanish companies ===
- UC Global

=== UK companies ===
| Name | HQ | Portfolio | Notes |
|---|---|---|---|
| Aegis Defence Services | London | Iraq, Afghanistan, and others | Contracted by the U.S. department of Defense during the most recent War in Iraq. Aegis Defence Services Ltd was acquired by GardaWorld International Protective Services. |
| Erinys International | Dubai | | A joint South African-British private security company registered in the British Virgin Islands. |
| G4S | London | | |
| Rubicon International Services | London | | Ex commonwealth SF. Acquired by Aegis Defence Services on 28 October 2005. |
| International Intelligence Limited | Eastington, Stroud | | Specialist contracts. Operates in the security and intelligence sectors. |
| Sandline International | London | | Ceased operations on April 16, 2004 |
| Atermis Contractors | Manchester, Bury | Iraq, Afghanistan, and others | Contracted by the British Ministry of Defence during the most recent War in Iraq. |

== Oceania ==
=== Australian companies ===
- Paladin Group (security company)
- Unity Resources Group

== See also ==
- List of mercenaries
- List of private security companies
- List of non-governmental paramilitary organisations
- List of designated terrorist groups
