= Asgard (disambiguation) =

Asgard is a location associated with the gods in Norse cosmology.

Asgard, Asgaard or Åsgård, may also refer to:

== Arts and entertainment ==
=== Fictional entities ===
- Asgard (comics), a realm in the fictional Marvel Comics universe, based on the Norse mythology
- Asgard (Conan) or Aesgaard, a kingdom in Conan the Barbarian universe
- Asgard, the starship that is the setting of most of Robert Heinlein's novel Starman Jones
- Asgard (Stargate), a race in the Stargate universe
- Asgard, or Ysgard, in the Dungeons & Dragons game
- Asgard, a city in Jack London's The Iron Heel

=== Music and television ===
- Asgard (album), by Adorned Brood, 2000
- "Asgard", a song by Therion from the 2001 album Secret of the Runes
- Asgaard (game show), a Mexican TV series

== Places ==
- Asgard Peak, British Columbia, Canada
- Mount Asgard, Baffin Island, Nunavut, Canada
- Asgard Range, Victoria Land, Antarctica
- Aasgard Pass, a mountain pass in Washington, U.S.
- Asgard (crater), on Jupiter's moon Callisto

== Ships ==
- Asgard (yacht), which ran guns for the Irish Volunteers in 1914
- Asgard II, an Irish sail training vessel, which sank in 2008

== Other uses ==
- Reidar Åsgård (born 1943), a Norwegian politician
- Asgard Company, a fitness company of Mark Rippetoe
- Asgaard – German Security Group, a German private military company
- Asgard (archaea), a proposed taxonomic group of single-celled organisms
- Asgaard (brewery), a German brewery
- Asgard field, a natural gas field

== See also ==
- Aasgaard
- Asgardian (disambiguation)
- Asguard (band), a Belarusian band
- Asgardia, a micronation in space
- Åsgardfonna, a glacier in the Arctic
- Åsgårdstrand, a town in Vestfold county, Norway
- Åsskard, a village in Surnadal Municipality in Møre og Romsdal county, Norway
- Åsskard Municipality, a former municipality in Møre og Romsdal county, Norway
- Hasguard, a hamlet in Pembrokeshire, Wales
