= Aasgaard =

Aasgaard is a Norwegian surname. Notable people with the surname include:

- Johan Arnd Aasgaard (1876–1966), American Lutheran church leader
- Thelo Aasgaard (born 2002), Norwegian footballer
- Torleif Aasgaard (1888–1953), Norwegian businessperson

== See also ==
- Asgard, Norse Mythology
- Aasgaard Company
