= Security detail =

Protective team assigned to an individual or group

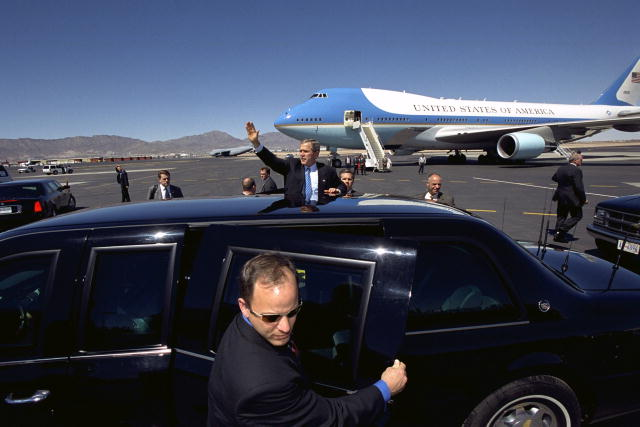
United States Secret Service agents protecting U.S. President George W. Bush in 2002

A security detail, often known as a PSD (protective services detail, personal security detachment, personal security detail) or PPD (personal protection detail), is a protective team assigned to protect the personal security of an individual or group. PSDs can consist of multiple federal and state government organisations, military personnel, law enforcement agents and/or private security contractors or private military contractors.

== U.S. Marine Corps ==
In the U.S. Marine Corps, an individual's security team is called a "personal security detachment" and is assigned to the Personal Security Company.

== Private security ==
PSD teams are often made up of private security personnel. Organizations such as Constellis, DynCorp and Triple Canopy, Inc. and their internal and external security departments offer armed security teams to clients traveling to war zones and areas deemed dangerous by the State Department.

== See also ==
- Bodyguard
- List of established military terms
- List of U.S. security clearance terms
- Glossary of military abbreviations
