= Russell Robinson (disambiguation) =

Russell Robinson is an American basketball player.

Russell Robinson or Russ Robinson may also refer to:

- Russell M. Robinson II (born 1932), American lawyer
- H. Russell Robinson (1920–1978), British military armourer and historian
- Russell Robinson (triple jumper) (born 2001), American triple jumper
- Russ Robinson, American heir and businessman
- Russ Robinson (footballer) (1928–2004), Australian footballer
