= Rippetoe =

Rippetoe is an English-language surname. It possibly derives from the French name Ribaudeau. It may refer to:

- Mark Rippetoe, American strength coach
- Jimmy Rip, real name Jimmy Rippetoe, an American guitarist
