= Northbridge Services Group =

Northbridge Services Group Ltd is a private defense contractor which is registered in the United States and Ghana. They maintain operational offices in the United States, Ghana, and the United Arab Emirates. Former presidents include LTG Sir Hew Pike, General Robert W. Kovacic. Its current acting president is Christopher Kelly. Many Northbridge personnel come from a military, political, governmental or diplomatic background.

== History ==
Northbridge Services Group Ltd has extensive experience in Africa, to include Côte d'Ivoire, Liberia, Nigeria, Republic of the Congo and the Democratic Republic of Congo.

In May 2003, Northbridge commandos rescued dozens of oil workers being held hostage on an oil rig. In June 2003, the company offered to arrest embattled Liberian president Charles Taylor , who was wanted for war crimes, for $4 million.

The firm hit the news in late 2003 when it announced it was seeking an investor to fund an operation to seize the disgraced ex-Liberian President Charles Taylor, who had been granted asylum in Nigeria at the time. Northbridge claimed that it had personnel that were ready to arrest and depose Taylor for a $2 million dollar bounty which had been offered by the United States Congress. A director at the firm, Pasquale Dipofi, said that any potential investors in the operation would be able to split the profits with the firm.

Starting in 2004 to 2007, the company was instrumental in providing security and logistical support in Iraq. In 2024 the company rebranded itself by launching a new website, instilling new leadership and new corporate governance.

== Services ==
Northbridge Services Group routinely provides governments, multi-national corporations, non-governmental organisations, the corporate sector and prominent individuals with:

- Security
- VIP/Close Protection
- Advice
- Training
- Operation Support
- Intelligence Support
- Political Analysis
- Diplomatic Analysis
- Humanitarian Operations
- Strategic Communications
- Support for law and order

== See also ==
- Aegis Defence Services
- Executive Outcomes
- Sandline International
