= Tony Hunter-Choat =

British Army officer (1936–2012)

Anthony Hunter-Choat
- Born: 12 January 1936; Purley, London
- Died: 12 April 2012 (aged 76)
- Military career
- Allegiance: France; United Kingdom; Oman
- Branch: French Foreign Legion (1957–1962); British Army (1962–1986); Royal Army of Oman (1986–1997)
- Service years: 1957–1997
- Rank: Brigadier
- Unit: 1st Foreign Parachute Regiment (1957–1962)
- Commands: 23 Special Air Service Regiment (1977–1983)
- Conflicts: Algerian War: Battle of Fedj Zezoua; Indonesia–Malaysia confrontation
- Awards: Officer of the Order of the British Empire; Legion of Honour (France); Médaille militaire (France); Cross for Military Valour (France); Order of Achievement (Oman)

Anthony Hunter-Choat OBE FRSA (12 January 1936 – 12 April 2012) was a British soldier who served in the French Foreign Legion, the British Army, including in the Special Air Service, and as the commander of the Sultan of Oman's special forces.

== Early life and education ==
Hunter-Choat was born in Purley, London, the son of Frederick, who worked in insurance, and Iris, a schoolteacher. The family later moved to Ascot. He attended Dulwich College and Kingston College of Art, where he trained as an architect. In his youth, he developed a taste for travel and languages, hitchhiking around Europe in his holidays.

== Military career ==
=== French Foreign Legion ===
After deciding a career in architecture was not for him, Hunter-Choat travelled to Paris in March 1957 to join the French Foreign Legion. He was pursued by his mother, but by the time she caught up with him, he had already signed up. He was sent for basic training in Algeria, which at the time was experiencing the Algerian War. Hunter-Choat volunteered for the additional training to become a paratrooper. On 15 October, he was posted to 1st Foreign Parachute Regiment (1e REP), with whom he would serve for the next five years.

At the time, the Algerian War had become a high-intensity conflict requiring around 400,000 French and colonial troops in the country to maintain order. In this time, Hunter-Choat and his unit were involved in numerous operations, inflicting and suffering many casualties. In February 1958, as a machine-gunner, Hunter-Choat took part in the Battle of Fedj Zezoua, for his service in which he was awarded the Cross for Military Valour. He was later awarded the Cross for Military Valour a further two times, as well as the Médaille militaire. Less than two weeks later he was wounded pursuing FLN troops through wooded territory near the Tunisian border.

In the Algiers putsch of 1961, Hélie de Saint Marc, the commander of 1e REP agreed to take part. Hunter-Choat was one of a number of troops who occupied key parts of Algiers on behalf of the putsch on the night of 21 April 1961. After Charles de Gaulle made an appeal on national television against the coup, support for it collapsed and 1e REP was subsequently disbanded. Shortly after, Hunter-Choat's term of service expired and he returned to Britain.

=== British Army ===
His father convinced him to apply to the British Army, but his first application in March 1962 was rejected because he was over the typical age. After his father wrote to them in April, he was accepted "as a special case, for consideration." After passing out the top in his course at Mons Officer Cadet School, he was assigned to the 7th Duke of Edinburgh's Own Gurkha Rifles and posted to Malaya. From there, in early 1963, he was posted to Brunei, and later to Sarawak and Borneo, where he fought in the Indonesia–Malaysia confrontation. Whilst there, Hunter-Choat took part in cross-border raids into Indonesia, as well as coastal raids.

He had initially signed up on a short service commission and wanted to transfer to a regular commission. Finding himself too old for the infantry, he joined the Royal Artillery in 1964. He remained in Borneo as a forward observer officer until 1966, when he returned to Britain. From 1969 to 1970, he attended the Staff College, Camberley, and then served in 45 Field Regiment RA. He became a battery commander and then became second-in-command of 3rd Regiment Royal Horse Artillery in Hong Kong. He served on the directing staff of the junior division of the Land Warfare Centre, Warminster, from 1975 to 1977.

In 1977, he was offered command of 23 Special Air Service Regiment (Reserve), which was unusual for an officer without a British special forces background. He commanded the regiment until 1983, although few details of his service in this period are available due to its sensitive nature. From 1983 to 1986, he was a senior staff officer at the NATO headquarters in Naples and a special forces adviser to the Supreme Allied Commander Europe (SACEUR). His last post in the British Army was as a personal liaison between the Commander-in-Chief of BAOR and his US counterpart. He retired from the army in 1986, at the rank of colonel, and was appointed OBE.

=== Later service ===
Immediately after retiring from the British Army, he became Commander of the Sultan of Oman's special forces at the rank of brigadier. His responsibilities included increasing the numbers in the special forces from under 1000 to more than 2000, and for improving their equipment and capability. In 1995, he was awarded the Omani Order of Achievement by Sultan Qaboos. He retired from the Omani Army in 1997. From 1998 to 1999, he worked as a Kosovo ceasefire verifier with the Kosovo Verification Mission. Speaking to The Guardian in 1999, he said "Our attitude is not patronising to either the Serb units or the guerrillas. We are simply trying to persuade them not to do something silly." He became the head of security for Aga Khan IV. This involved helping to create a base for the Aga Khan at Chantilly, Oise.

After the 2003 invasion of Iraq, Hunter-Choat became head of security for the Coalition Provisional Authority's Program Management Office (PMO), which was responsible for funding reconstruction projects in the country. He was involved in some scandal when the PMO awarded a contract worth $293 million to Aegis Defence Services headed by Tim Spicer, who Hunter-Choat knew personally. However, there was no suggestion that Hunter-Choat had acted improperly. He was later responsible for making security plans for USAID in Afghanistan and was an accomplished lecturer on leadership and security.

== Legacy ==
The Hunter-Choat pace stick is awarded biennially to a Combined Cadet Force cadet in Hereford. French Foreign Legion 1831–71, by Martin Windrow, published by Osprey Publishing, is both dedicated to, and prefaced by, Hunter-Choat.

== Personal life ==
He married Maureen McCabe in 1964, but the marriage was later dissolved. He married again, to Linda Wood, in 1982. He had two daughters from his first marriage and two daughters and a son from his second marriage. Hunter-Choat had served as both president and secretary general of the British branch of the Foreign Legion Association and was a keen Freemason. Hunter-Choat was also a member of the Sublime Society of Beefsteaks.

== Awards ==
Besides winning the Cross for Military Valour three times, and winning the Médaille militaire, Hunter-Choat was appointed OBE and awarded the Omani Order of Achievement. In 2001, he was appointed as an Officer of the Legion of Honour, and was raised to Commander in 2011. He was also a Fellow of the Royal Society of Arts and a Freeman of the City of London.
