= Tim Spicer =

British military officer and executive

- Born: Timothy Simon Spicer; 1952 (age 73–74); Aldershot, England
- Spouse: Pauline Amos
- Military career
- Branch: British Armed Forces
- Service years: 1970 – 1994
- Rank: Lieutenant-Colonel
- Units: Scots Guards
- Conflicts: While serving in the UK's Scots Guard: Falklands War; 1991 Gulf War; UN force in Bosnia Working for Private Military Companies: Bougainville Uprising; Sierra Leone Civil War; Iraq War
- Awards: Officer of the Order of the British Empire (OBE); General Service Medal; South Atlantic Medal
- Other work: Founder of the private military corporation Sandline International and former CEO of Aegis Defence Services. Author.

Timothy Simon Spicer, OBE (born 1952) is a former British Army officer, and former CEO of the private security company Aegis Defence Services. He served in the Falklands War and in Northern Ireland. He founded Sandline International, a private military company which closed in April 2004. He is the author of three books: An Unorthodox Soldier: Peace and War and the Sandline Affair (2000), A Dangerous Enterprise: Secret War at Sea (2021) and A Suspicion of Spies: Risk, Secrets and Shadows - the Biography of Wilfred ‘Biffy’ Dunderdale was published on 12 September 2024.

== Early life and military career ==
Born in 1952 in Aldershot, England, Spicer was educated at Sherborne School and followed his father into the British Army, attending Sandhurst and then was commissioned in the Scots Guards. He tried to join the Special Air Service (SAS), but failed the selection course. In 1982, his regiment was pulled from guard duty at the Tower of London and sent to the Falklands War, where he saw action at the Battle of Mount Tumbledown on 13 June.

After the Falklands War, Spicer, then at the rank of lieutenant colonel, was sent to Northern Ireland along with his regiment as part of Operation Banner during the Troubles. In 1992, Spicer was awarded the OBE "for operational service in Northern Ireland". On 4 September of that year, two soldiers under his command, Mark Wright and James Fisher, shot and killed an 18-year old Catholic teenager named Peter McBride in disputed circumstances. Immediately following the incident, Wright and Fisher were interviewed by Spicer and three other officers before they were interrogated by the Royal Ulster Constabulary (RUC). In his 1999 autobiography An Unorthodox Soldier, Spicer wrote that "I thought between us we could reach a balanced judgement on what happened."

The two soldiers were subsequently tried via court-martial, which convicted them of murder and sentenced the pair to life imprisonment at HM Prison Maghaberry on 10 February 1995. At the court-martial, Wright and James claimed that they feared that McBride was about to throw an improvised explosive device he had hidden in a plastic bag towards them, a claim which Spicer supported (the bag was subsequently found to only contain a t-shirt).

In reaction to their conviction, Spicer organised a lobbying campaign to free Wright and James, arguing that the two had legitimately believed that their lives were in imminent danger due to McBride's actions. The campaign successfully persuaded the British government to free the pair from HM Prison Maghaberry on 2 September 1998, after they had spent roughly three and a half years in prison. Wright and James were flown to Catterick Garrison in Yorkshire to meet Spicer, where they stayed until the Army Board decided to reinstate them into the Scots Guards a month later; the pair subsequently served in the Iraq War.

== Private military company ==
In 1994 he left the army and founded Sandline International, a private military company.

=== Sandline affair ===
The Sandline affair was a political scandal that became one of the defining moments in the history of Papua New Guinea (PNG), and particularly that of the conflict in Bougainville. It brought down the PNG government of Sir Julius Chan and took Papua New Guinea to the verge of military revolt. After coming to power in 1994, Prime Minister Chan made repeated attempts to resolve the Bougainville conflict by diplomatic means. These were ultimately unsuccessful, due to the repeated failure of Bougainvillean leaders to arrive at scheduled peace talks.

After a number of failed military assaults and the refusal of Australia and New Zealand to provide troops, a decision was then made to investigate the use of mercenaries. Through some overseas contacts, defence minister Mathias Ijape was put in contact with Spicer. He accepted a contract for $36 million, but the deal fell through when the PNG Army found out that so much money was being spent on a job they claimed to be able to do. The Army overthrew the PNG government and arrested Spicer. He was eventually released and sued the PNG government for money not paid.

=== Sierra Leone Scandal: the arms-to-Africa affair ===
When employed by Sandline International, Spicer was involved in military operations in the Sierra Leone Civil War, which included importing weapons in apparent violation of the United Nations arms embargo. The contract was first offered to Globe Risk International who declined the contract on moral grounds. He had been contacted by Rakesh Saxena, an Indian financier hoping that a new government would grant him diamond and mineral concessions. The controversy over this incident, and whether the British Foreign and Commonwealth Office (FCO) knew of Sandline's actions; inquiries into it concluded that the FCO had known of the actions, and that Spicer believed he was not breaking the embargo. However, former British diplomat Craig Murray claims that he was present at a Foreign office meeting when Spicer was explicitly read the text of UN Security Council Resolution 1132 which obliges member states to prevent their nationals from importing arms to Sierra Leone.

Spicer maintains neither he nor Sandline did anything illegal:

Neither Sandline nor Tim Spicer did anything illegal and were, if anything, victims of a wider UK political controversy. Sandline was contracted to supply weapons and professional services to the legitimate elected government of Sierra Leone. This government had been deposed by a military junta in alliance with the Revolutionary United Front, a barbaric rebel movement. The British government knew of the action, which did not contravene international law or the UN Security Council’s arms embargo. The facts are borne out by a Government investigation, two inquiries and a UN Legal opinion.

— Spicer's FAQ page

Spicer has claimed that he always has called for greater involvement of the British government in the PMC issue. In fact, Lt. Col. Spicer said that six weeks before the arms-to-Africa affair blew up, Sandline had submitted a paper to the Foreign Office calling for greater regulation, but had not yet received a response. At the time, with no government response, Sandline was considering setting up its own oversight committee, including a senior retired general, a lawyer and a representative of the media.

In late 1999, Spicer left Sandline, which kept operating until 2004. The next year, he launched Crisis and Risk Management. In 2001, he changed the company's name to Strategic Consulting International and also set up a partner firm specialising in anti-piracy consulting, called Trident Maritime. In 2002, Spicer established Aegis Defence Services, which around the beginning of the Iraq War was consulting for the Disney Cruise Line.

=== Aegis Defence Services ===
Spicer was Chief Executive of Aegis Defence Services, a PMC based in London, until replaced by Major General Graham Binns in 2010. The chairman of the Aegis board of directors is former Defence minister, Nicholas Soames MP. The Board of Directors include: General Sir Roger Wheeler, Chief of the General Staff; Paul Boateng, former Labour Minister and ex-High Commissioner to South Africa and Sir John Birch, former British deputy ambassador to the United Nations.

In October 2004, Aegis won a $293 million three-year contract in Iraq outsourcing, among other things, intelligence for the U.S. Army.

Spicer is effectively in charge of the second largest military force in Iraq – some 20,000 private soldiers. Just don't call him a mercenary.

— Stephen Armstrong Guardian journalist

=== Criticism by U.S. senators ===
In 2005, following the award of this contract, five United States senators – Charles Schumer, Hillary Clinton, Ted Kennedy, Chris Dodd and John Kerry – wrote a joint letter calling on Secretary of Defence Donald Rumsfeld to investigate the granting of the Aegis contract, describing Spicer as "an individual with a history of supporting excessive use of force against a civilian population" and stating that he "vigorously defends [human rights abuses]".

In a December 2005 letter to his constituents, then-U.S. Senator Barack Obama (D-IL) called on the Department of Defense to withdraw its contract with Aegis. Obama wrote that "The CEO of Aegis Defense Services Tim Spicer has been implicated in a variety of human rights abuses around the globe ... given his history, I agree that the United States should consider rescinding its contract with his company."

== See also ==
- Tony Hunter-Choat

== Books ==
Spicer is the author of three books:

- An Unorthodox Soldier: Peace and War and the Sandline Affair (2000)
- A Dangerous Enterprise: Secret War at Sea,
- A Suspicion of Spies: Risk, Secrets and Shadows - the Biography of Wilfred ‘Biffy’ Dunderdale, published on 12 September 2024.
