= Vorawan Chitavanich =

Thai footballer (born 1961)

Personal information
- Full name: Vorawan Chitavanich
- Date of birth: 28 May 1961 (age 65)
- Place of birth: Bangkok, Thailand
- Position: Midfielder

Youth career
- 1977–1979: Samsen Wittayalai School

Senior career*
Years	Team	Apps	(Gls)
1980–1984	Rajpracha		
1985	Teijin Matsuyama		
1986–1987	Frederikshavn fI		
1987–1990	Viborg FF		
1991–1993	Rajpracha		
1994–1995	Bangkok Bank of Commerce		

International career^{‡}
???	Thailand	??	(??)

Managerial career
- 1995: Bangkok Bank of Commerce
- 1998–1999: BEC Tero Sasana
- 1999–2003: Sembawang Rangers
- 2004–2010: Tampines Rovers
- 2011–2012: Samut Songkhram
- 2013–2015: Angthong
- 2015: Krabi
- 2017: Nan
- 2021–2022: Patong City
- 2026–: Rajpracha
- * Club domestic league appearances and goals ‡ National team caps and goals as of June 20, 2008

Vorawan Chitavanich (Thai: วรวรรณ ชิตะวณิช) is a former midfielder who played for Thailand national team and was one of a few Thai players who played in Europe.

== Managerial career ==
=== Tampines Rovers ===
Vorawan Chitavanich managed Tampines Rovers and achieved the S.League and Singapore Cup double in 2004. The following season, the Stags successfully defended their S.League title, were named the 'S.League Team of the Decade' and became the first Singaporean team to win the ASEAN Club Championship. They won Singapore Cup in 2006, but finished runners-up to SAFFC in the S.League.

== Honours ==
=== Manager ===
Tampines Rovers

- S.League (2): 2004, 2005
- Singapore Cup (2): 2004, 2006
- ASEAN Club Championship (1): 2005
