= Zolki Band =

Belarusian indie rock band

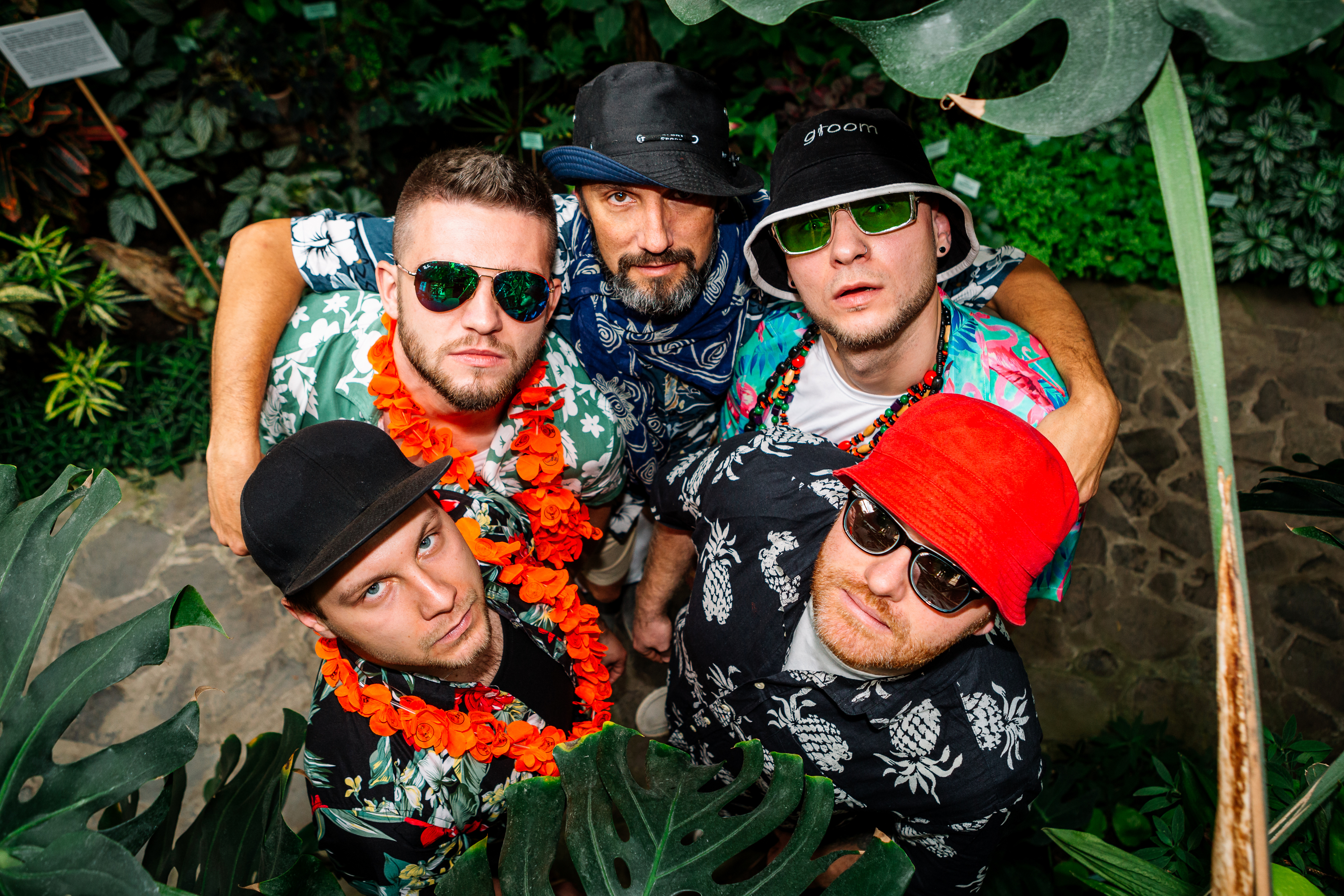
- Zolki Band in 2019 (from left to right: shell, kukuruzo, trikil, f.s.t., green)

Background information
- Origin: Brest, Belarus
- Genres: Indie rock, Alternative rock
- Years active: 2013–present
- Spinoff of: Daj Darohu (Belarusian: Дай Дарогу)
- Members: shell green kukuruzo trikil f.s.t.
- Past members: rotten

Zolki Band is a Belarusian indie rock band from Brest, which was founded in 2013 by former members of the Daj Darohu (Belarusian: Дай Дарогу), Intra muros, and D_tails bands.

== History ==
The band's first single “Śniežań” (transl. December) topped the charts for the 2013–14 season of the music portal Tuzin.fm. The song was recorded in collaboration with the Landau band and is dedicated to the civil protests in Minsk taken place in December 2010 and the following crackdown.

In 2014 Zolki Band released its debut album Doŭhi doŭhi dzień supported with music videos for songs “Rak” and “B.E.Z.R.A.Z.L.I.C.H.I.E. — heta tradycyja.” Later that year the band was nominated in the category of “Opening of the Year” at the “Heroes of the Year Awards” (presented by Tuzin.fm).

In May 2019 Zolki Band released a music video for the song “Drevy i cieni” (transl. Trees and Shadows) dedicated to protests against the construction of the Chinese-funded lead-acid battery factory near Brest. Also the release of the second album was announced, the first part of which entitled “Šort Šort Night, Pt. 1” was subsequently released on September 15, 2019. The band's latest album, named "Šort Šort Night, Pt. 2", was released on February 10, 2021.

== Band members ==
- shell — drums
- green — bass guitar
- kukuruzo — acoustic guitar, keyboards, backing vocals
- trikil — guitar, keyboards, backing vocals
- f.s.t. — lead vocals

Production

- dizel — sound engineer

Former members

- rotten — guitar

== Discography ==
Studio albums

- 2014 - Doǔhi doǔhi dzień
- 2019 - Šort Šort Night, Pt. 1
- 2021 - Šort Šort Night, Pt. 2

EPs, singles, lives

- 2013 - Śniežań (single, together with Landau)
- 2015 - Choladna z vami (EP)
- 2016 - KvaziČalaviek (single)
- 2017 - Kaliadny raǔt (live)
- 2018 - Zolki Band у Belsat Music Live (live)
- 2019 - Drevy i cieni (single)
- 2020 - Sonca ŭ kufli (single)
- 2020 - Času strała (single)
- 2020 - Spaghettification (single)
- 2022 - Matematyčny eciud u svietłych tanach (sigle)
