= Martin S. =

Belarusian rock band

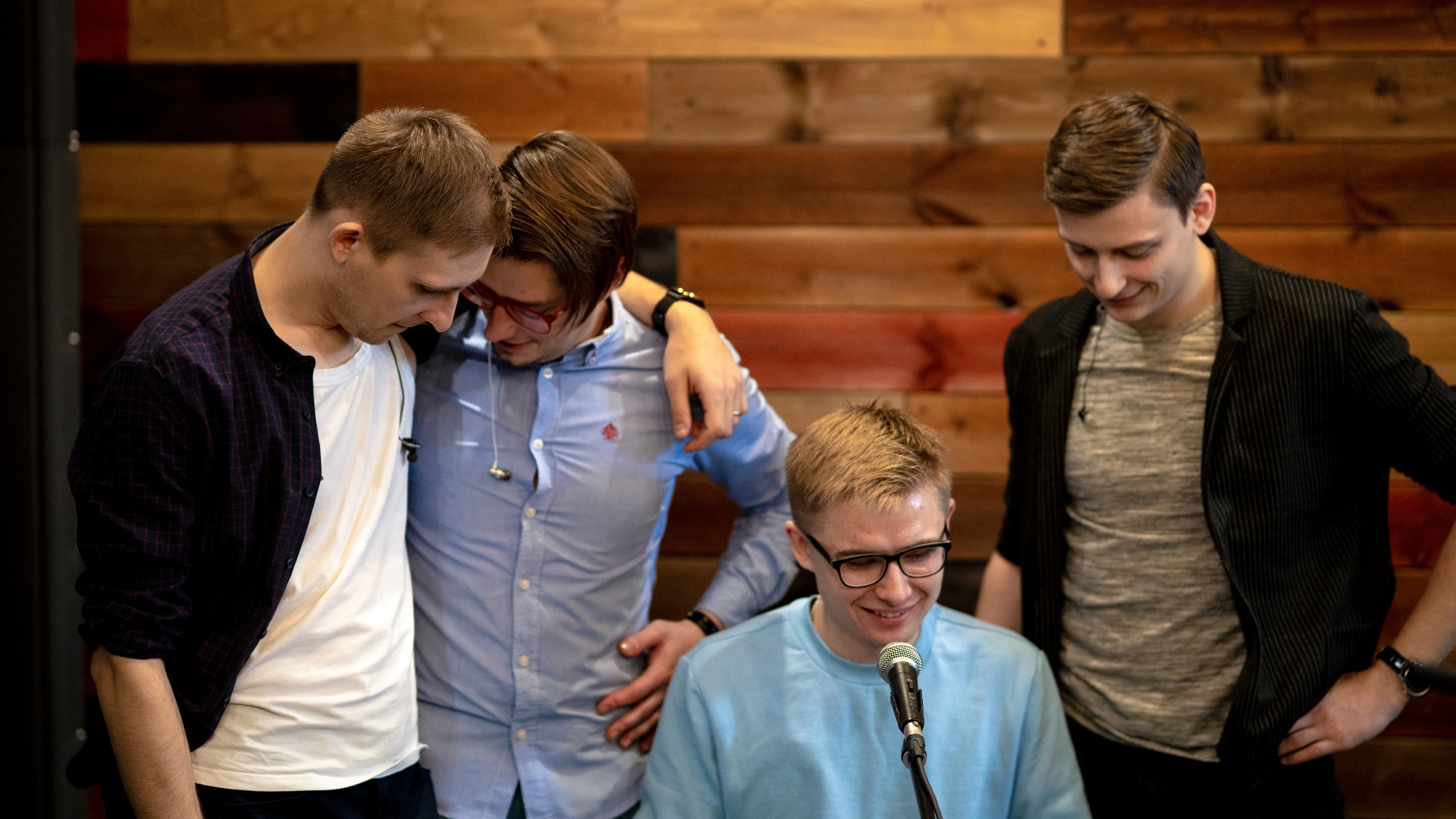
- Members of Martin S. (from left to right: Uladzimier Bośka, Andrej Marčanka, Hiera Supakoŭ, Iĺlia Baśko) in the studio during the filming of a live-video for the single "Novy Dzień" (February 2019)

Background information
- Origin: Belarus
- Genres: indie rock, pop-rock
- Years active: 2011 — present
- Label: Vigma
- Members: Uladzimier Bośka, Iĺlia Baśko, Andrej Marčanka, Hiera Supakoŭ
- Past members: Aliaksiej Kancavy, Viačaslaŭ Uścinaŭ, Cimafiej Čabunin, Marjana Šendiezielieva, Jaŭhien Šeliepień, Marharyta Miadźvieckaja
- Website: martin-s.org

Martin S. (Belarusian: Марцін С.) is a music band formed by members of MoZart (Belarusian: Моцарт), the band had existed since 2003, in 2011. It is the winner of the 9th BSU Open Music Festival "Such gingerbreads" (2012). In 2012 it was honored as "Breakthrough of the Year" (2nd place) presented by Tuzin.fm. The band released two studio albums: "Martin S." on 12 tracks (2012) and "Pieršy" on 9 tracks (2015); three singles: "Chutkija" (together with Ksienija Žuk from Naviband) (2013), "Pampieja" (together with Iver) (2014), "Novy Dzień" (2019); one EP: "Nie Zabyć Pamylki Nikoli" on 4 tracks (2014).

== History ==
At the beginning of November 2011 former members of the MoZart band, which had existed since 2003, formed a new band called Martin S. led by singer and songwriter Uladzimier Bośka. At the end of November 2011 the band filed an application for participation in the Belarusian selection to the Eurovision Song Contest 2012 for the first time, which took place at the beginning of December 2011. Martin S. released the first single "Mala Miesca," which was recorded at the Hienadź Syrakvaš's studio, on March 27, 2012. The recording sessions for the first album began at the "Mapletree" studio in August 2012. Most of the songs on the album were recorded at the "Nerves of Steel" studio, where they were mixed by Siarhiej Kudzielič. The first ("Red") part of the album on 3 songs was released on September 27, 2012. The second ("Blue") part of the album on 3 songs was released on October 15. The band performed all of the 6 "red" and "blue" new songs during the third Men's Fest, which was held at the facilities of Brest Electro-Mechanical Plant on October 27. The band released the third ("Green") part of the album that was the last and consisted of 3 songs too on November 6, 2012. The full debut CD filled with 12 compositions was published on the Vigma record label on November 8, 2012. The band became the winner of the 9th Open Music Festival "Such gingerbreads," which was held by Belarusian State University at the Minsk club "The Center" on November 29, 2012, and got the prize in a form of rehearsal time in the professional music studio of the enterprise "Bum." At the festival, the band represented the Radio Physics and Computer Technologies Faculty of BSU. The band presented the album "Martin S." with a concert at the Minsk club "RE:Public" on December 6.

The band released a remix album on 10 songs from the first album on March 3, 2013. Ten DJs made their mixes in a dozen of directions of electronic music: progressive house, breakbeat, club house, trance, glitch, big beat, trap music, dubstep, chill-out, house. DJs Vitaĺ "Ghost", Paval "Transet" Vierchni, Dzianis "Benis" Vaĺko, Maksim Kavalioŭ, Aliaksiej "Spaceman," Taciana "Stevia Pill" Silin, Anton "NetMoRaLLi" Ščurok, Iĺlia "Iver" Baśko, Aĺbert "A.e.r.o." Sipaŭ, and Stanislaŭ "Lorado" Žvanik offered their remixes. In the summer of 2013 Martin S. gave a series of concerts in the regional centers of Belarus, Russia (Moscow), and Lithuania (Vilnius). The single "Chutkija," which was recorded together with Ksienija Žuk ("Sonika") for three months, was released on 7 October 2013. A total of 17 people from 4 bands collaborated on it. The song "Chutkija" was presented live at the Minsk club "Graffiti" on October 17.

The mini-album "Nie Zabyć Pamylki Nikoli" filled with 3 songs "Nie zabyć," "Pamylki," "Nikoli" recorded at the "fOrZ" studio (sound engineer – Źmicier Hladko) was released on February 12, 2014. The band presented the new EP on a concert held at the capital club "The Pirates" on March 3. Martin S. released the single "Pampieja" on April 1, 2014. The band released a video for the song "Pampieja" shot at Janka Kupala National Theatre on May 25, 2014. Operators Aliaksandar Aliejnikaŭ and Stanislaŭ Turko, as well as actors Artur Rajski and Maryja Butkievič were involved in the shootings. The band made its first appearance at the 14th Festival of the Belarusian Song and Poetry "Mala93ječna" on June 25, 2014. In July 2014 Martin S. made its first appearance at the 23rd International Festival "Slavianski Bazaar in Vitebsk." The band released the EP "Jak jość," which was recorded at the voluntary donations expense, on November 28, 2014.

At the end of January 2015 there were three original band members (Uladzimier Bośka, Iĺlia Baśko, Jaŭhien Šeliepień) left, and three new ones (bassist Marharyta Miadźvieckaja, guitarist Andrej Marčanka, and drummer Hiera Supakoŭ) were added to the lineup. The band announced on June 1, 2015 that it successfully raised $3000 by crowdfunding to record a new album. Martin S. released the EP "Uščent" on June 5, 2015. It released its second album "Pieršy" on 9 songs on October 5, 2015, while a concert presentation of the album was held in the Minsk club "RE:Public" on October 28. The band presented the song "Tak i treba" from the album in the chart of the Tuzin.fm music portal on February 10, 2016.

The band celebrated its fifth anniversary with a big solo concert in the Minsk club "Brugge" on March 15, 2017.

== Criticism ==
On the example of the joint-concert of Belarusian rockers in March 2013, Tatyana Bober, concert reviewer over at the portal "Pamiarkoŭny Huk," noted that the band plays "soft" rock.

In a review of the album "Martin S." published on October 24, 2013, the creator of the music portal Tuzin.fm Siarhei Budkin noticed that the band "mainly aims at ballads" and "plays intelligent indie-rock" with a violin. He highlighted the songs "Stomlieny," "Chto ty" and "My zrobim usio," a rhythmic one, since "these works could be chanted by the progressive part of society throughout the country," even though he made critical remarks that the band lacks a clear promise, because "sometimes the lyrics appear to be too overloaded as to meaning, sometimes they are too naive, while there is not enough of apt expressions that can be stretched on quotes, though."

== Albums ==
- "Martin S." (2012) (12 tracks, 40 mins.). Music by Iĺlia Baśko (1–4, 8–12), Uladzimier Bośka (5–7). Lyrics by Uladzimier Bośka. Personnel: Uladzimier Bośka (vocals), Iĺlia Baśko (keyboards), Jaŭhien Šeliepień (violin), Aliaksiej Kancavy (bass), Viačaslaŭ Uścinaŭ (guitars, trumpet), Cimafiej Čabunin (drums, cello), Marjana Šendzielieva (vocals); mastering by Siarhiej Kudzielič at the "Nerves of Steel" studio.

| No. | Title | Lyrics | Music | Transliteration | Length |
|---|---|---|---|---|---|
| 1. | "Уводзіны" | | Iĺlia Baśko | Uvodziny | 1:17 |
| 2. | "Раз на раз" | Uladzimier Bośka | Iĺlia Baśko | Raz na raz | 3:46 |
| 3. | "Маю надзею" | Uladzimier Bośka | Iĺlia Baśko | Maju nadzieju | 3:53 |
| 4. | "Мала месца" | Uladzimier Bośka | Iĺlia Baśko | Mala miesca | 2:49 |
| 5. | "Хто ты" | Uladzimier Bośka | Uladzimier Bośka | Chto ty | 4:04 |
| 6. | "Стомлены" | Uladzimier Bośka | Uladzimier Bośka | Stomlieny | 4:23 |
| 7. | "Дзёньнікі" | Uladzimier Bośka | Uladzimier Bośka | Dziońniki | 4:13 |
| 8. | "Талісман" | Uladzimier Bośka | Iĺlia Baśko | Talisman | 2:51 |
| 9. | "Мы зробім усё" | Uladzimier Bośka | Iĺlia Baśko | My zrobim usio | 3:02 |
| 10. | "Блізкія" | Uladzimier Bośka | Iĺlia Baśko | Blizkija | 4:47 |
| 11. | "Мэханіка" | Uladzimier Bośka | Iĺlia Baśko | Mechanika | 3:44 |
| 12. | "Зыход" | | Iĺlia Baśko | Zychod | 0:48 |

- "Nie Zabyć Pamylki Nikoli" (2014) (4 tracks, 21 mins.). Personnel: Uladzimier Bośka (vocals), Iĺlia Baśko (keyboards), Jaŭhien Šeliepień (violin), Marharyta Miadźvieckaja (bass), Viačaslaŭ Uścinaŭ (guitars), Cimafiej Čabunin (drums); mastering by Źmicier Halodka at the "fOrZ" studio (Minsk).

| No. | Title | Lyrics | Music | Transliteration | Length |
|---|---|---|---|---|---|
| 1. | "Не забыць" | Uladzimier Bośka | Iĺlia Baśko | Nie zabyć | 3:11 |
| 2. | "Памылкі" | Uladzimier Bośka | Iĺlia Baśko | Pamylki | 4:08 |
| 3. | "Ніколі" | Uladzimier Bośka | Iĺlia Baśko | Nikoli | 3:26 |
| 4. | "Не забыць памылкі ніколі" | Uladzimier Bośka | Iĺlia Baśko | Nie zabyć pamylki nikoli | 10:46 |

- "Pieršy" (2015) (9 tracks, 34 mins.). Personnel: Uladzimier Bośka (vocals), Iĺlia Baśko (keyboards), Jaŭhien Šeliepień (violin), Marharyta Miadźvieckaja (bass), Andrej Marčanka (guitars), Hiera Supakoŭ (drums); mastering by Źmicier Halodka at the "fOrZ" studio (Minsk).

| No. | Title | Lyrics | Music | Transliteration | Length |
|---|---|---|---|---|---|
| 1. | "Як ёсьць" | Uladzimier Bośka | Iĺlia Baśko | Jak jość | 3:56 |
| 2. | "Так і трэба" | Uladzimier Bośka | Iĺlia Baśko | Tak i treba | 3:39 |
| 3. | "Уцякалі" | Uladzimier Bośka | Iĺlia Baśko | Uciakali | 4:29 |
| 4. | "Марыць" | Uladzimier Bośka | Iĺlia Baśko | Maryć | 3:19 |
| 5. | "Ушчэнт" | Uladzimier Bośka | Iĺlia Baśko | Uščent | 4:11 |
| 6. | "Позна" | Uladzimier Bośka | Iĺlia Baśko | Pozna | 4:01 |
| 7. | "Дэманы" | Uladzimier Bośka | Iĺlia Baśko | Demany | 3:13 |
| 8. | "Дэльфіны" | Uladzimier Bośka | Iĺlia Baśko | Deĺfiny | 3:44 |
| 9. | "Матывацыя" | Uladzimier Bośka | Iĺlia Baśko | Matyvacyja | 2:57 |

== Band members ==
- Uladzimier Bośka – vocals (2011–)
- Iĺlia Baśko – keyboards (2011–)
- Andrej Marčanka – guitars (2015–)
- Hiera Supakoŭ – drums (2015–)

Former members

- Jaŭhien Šeliepień – violin (2011–2018)
- Aliaksiej Kancavy – bass (2011–2014)
- Marharyta Miadźvieckaja – bass (2015–2018)
- Viačaslaŭ Uścinaŭ – guitars, trumpet (2011–2014)
- Cimafiej Čabunin – drums, cello (2011–2014)
- Marjana Šendzielieva – vocals (2011–2012)
