= Asgardian =

Asgardian may refer to:

- Asgard, a location associated with the gods in Norse cosmology
- Asgard (Archaea), a proposed superphylum of the Archaea domain of organisms
- Asgard (comics), the fictional realm in Marvel Comics
  - Asgardians of the Galaxy, a team of superheroes
- Asgardia, a micronation in space
- Asgardian (Young Avengers), former name of Wiccan, a fictional character in Marvel Comics

== See also ==
- Asgard (disambiguation)
