= MAG Aerospace =

American military contractor

- Industry: Government Services, Defense Contracting
- Founded: 2009
- Headquarters: Fairfax, Virginia
- Key people: Joe Fluet (Co-founder); Joe Paull (Co-founder); Brian Stites (Vice president)
- Website: magaero.com

MAG Aerospace is an American-owned military contractor based in Fairfax, Virginia, founded by Joe Fluet in 2009. It specializes in intelligence, surveillance and reconnaissance services operations, a well as training and technical services.

MAG employs about 1,300 personnel and records over $400 million in annual sales.

== History ==
MAG Aerospace was founded in 2009 by Joe Fluet and Joe Paull.

MAG Aerospace grew by 70% to 80% annually from 2015 to 2018 to more than $300 million in annual revenue. Having secured private equity backing in 2018 from New Mountain Capital, a New York-based firm with $20 billion in assets, MAG Aerospace acquired four companies over the two years of 2017 and 2018.

In 2018, former Army Chief of Staff General Peter Schoomaker joined MAG Aerospace's board of directors.

As of May 2019, MAG Aerospace continues to help the U.S. military fight the Taliban in Afghanistan as part of Task Force ODIN under the Army’s Medium Altitude Reconnaissance and Surveillance System (MARSS) program.

In 2021, the United Nations peacekeeping mission in Mali contracted US-based MAG Aerospace to provide fixed wing intelligence, surveillance and reconnaissance aircraft. They will use Cessna 208 aircraft to meet the UN requirements.

In 2023, MAG Aerospace and SAS, an analytics company, announced a partnership after receiving $900 million contract from the U.S. Space Force. The two companies will help the Space Force analyze data from their radars and sensors. MAG was one of 18 other companies to be chosen for the Space Force contract.

MAG Aerospace and Zapata AI, a generative intelligence provider, announced a partnership in October 2024 to build an airborne surveillance platform.

In April 2025, the company partnered with Parallel Flight Technologies, a company focused on hybrid-propulsion drone technology, to advance drone-based defense solutions and other response operations. In the same month, MAG did a series of tests with Gogo Business Aviation using their electronically steered antenna (ESA).

== Acquisitions ==
The company acquired BOSH Global Services in 2015, followed by Dover Vantage, a remote services company, in 2016. In 2017, it purchased Avenge, a company specializing in manned ISR training and operations.

In 2018, it acquired the southern Maryland defense contractor Ausley Associates, as well as Avenge Inc. and North American Surveillance Systems Inc.

== Recognition ==
In 2025, MAG Aerospace was nominated to the DCA Live Red Hot List as one of the fastest-growing companies in the DC area.

In 2019, MAG Aerospace won a Moxie award in the GovCon category.

In 2017, MAG Aerospace had the #779 spot on the Inc. 5000.

== See also ==
- List of private military contractors
- Private military company
