= C. Geijer & Co =

Norwegian industrial company

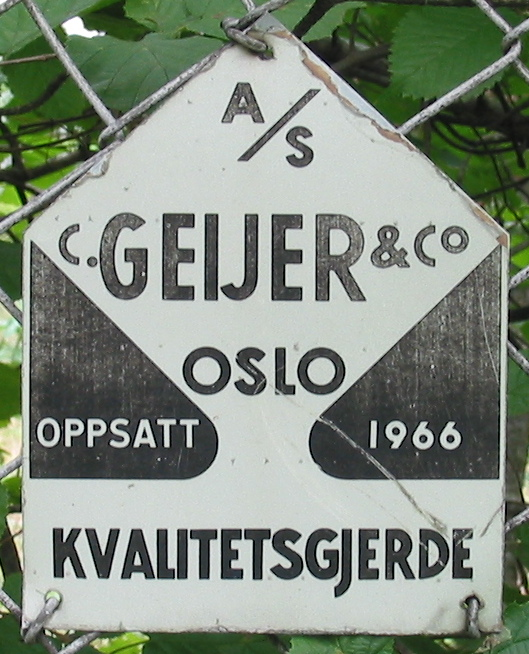
- Industry: fences, gates, vehicle parts, cars
- Founded: 1869
- Headquarters: Oslo, Norway
- Key people: Carl Axel Geijer (founder)

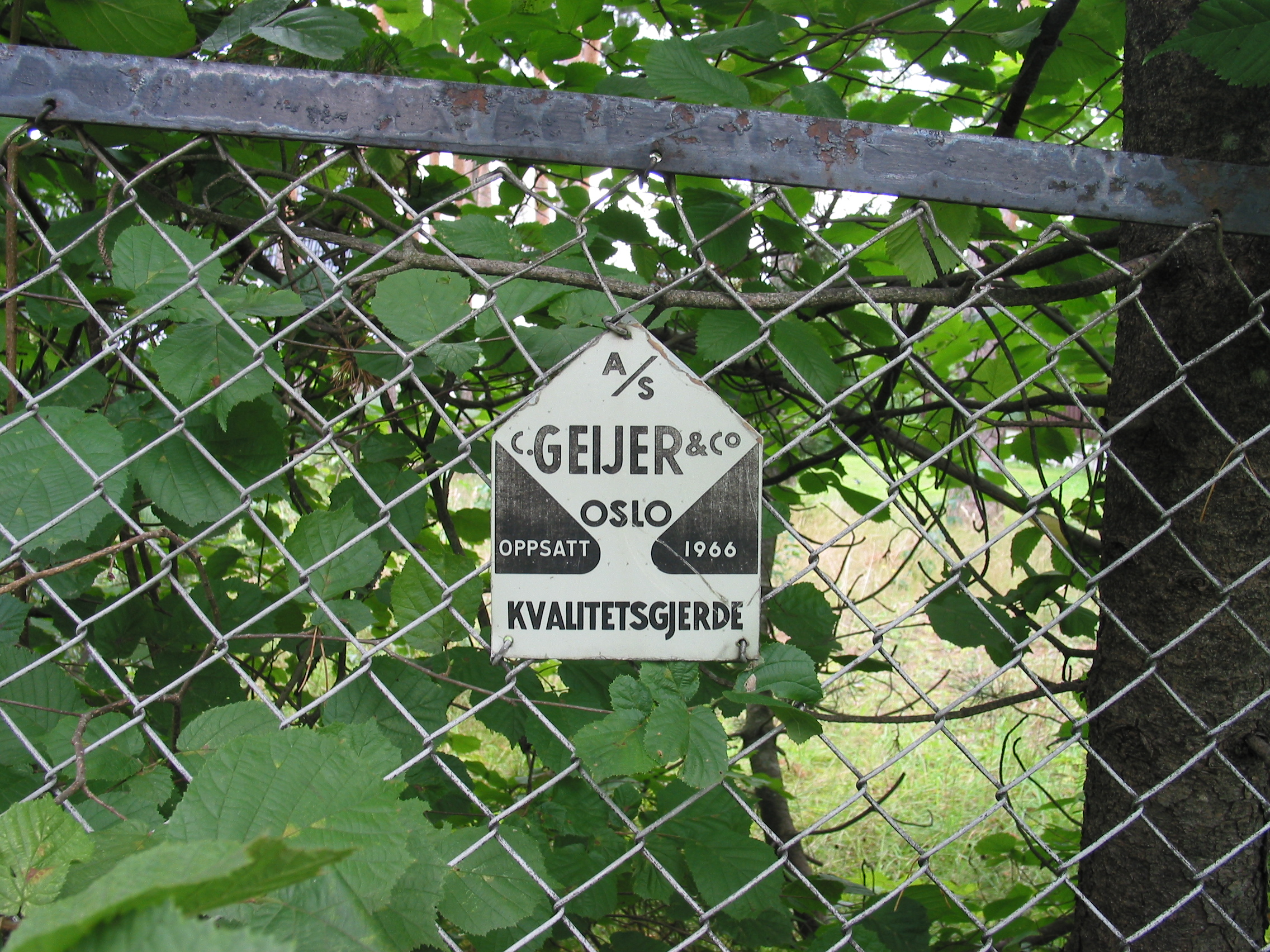
A trace of C. Geijer & Co in modern times.

C. Geijer & Co was a Norwegian industrial company.

It was established in 1869 by Swedish expatriate Carl Axel Geijer in Kristiania. His purpose was to be a wholesaler of iron and other metal products, but the company soon started producing wire and fence-related products. It was among the country's leading companies in its field. After Carl Axel Geijer's death in 1899, the company was eventually taken over by C. J. Aasgaard. Leadership was passed on to his son Torleif Aasgaard in 1927, then to Tor and Iver Aasgaard in 1952.

Between 1923 and 1930, a subdivision of the company produced the car brand Geijer. The engine was imported from Hershell-Spillmann, from 1926 Lycoming Engines, and the gearbox was from Mechanics Machine Co, but several other parts including the coachwork were produced on-site in Kristiania. In total about 25 cars were produced, none of which exist today. The company also produced about 300 bus coachworks.

From 1983 C. Geijer & Co had to cooperate with Trondhjems Jernindustri in fence products. Its financial situation became worse towards the end of the 1980s. In 1989 Trondhjems Jernindustri sold Geijer to Swedish company Gunnebo.
