= Rakesh Saxena =

Indian convicted criminal, financier and trader in the derivatives market

Rakesh Saxena (born 13 July 1952, at Indore, Madhya Pradesh, India) is an Indian convicted criminal, financier and trader in the derivatives market. He is accused of embezzlement in the 1990s from his work as treasury adviser to the Bangkok Bank of Commerce (BBC) and is widely reputed to have been engaged in dozens of high risk ventures and deals throughout the world over the previous three decades.

In October 2009, he was deported to Thailand after fighting the longest extradition battle in Canadian history, which lasted 13 years. In June 2012 Saxena was jailed for 10 years by Bangkok South Criminal Court, and ordered to pay US$41 million in fines and compensation, after being convicted five counts of securities fraud between 1992 and 1995.

== Early years ==
Rakesh Saxena was born 13 July 1952 in Indore, Madhya Pradesh, India. As a child he studied in England, because his mother was an international lawyer. He later lived in New Delhi, India and studied at St Columba's School, and St. Stephen's College. While in university he developed strong Marxist political leanings and by 1974 he graduated with a Master of Arts degree in English.

He worked in a foreign exchange and money market brokerage company, where he concentrated on complex financial transactions and foreign exchange speculation, first in Delhi, Bombay, Sri Lanka and Singapore, and then for the Oriental Bank of Commerce in Delhi.

In the late-1970s, Saxena moved to Hong Kong, where he met his wife, a Thai national. In Hong Kong, he worked as a foreign exchange dealer in Kowloon in the 1980s, and then joined Wocom Commodities. He moved his base to Bangkok in 1985 where the Bank of Thailand had announced the opening up of the forex markets. He then shifted focus to the derivatives arena.

In Bangkok, Saxena dealt in speculation on buying and selling companies and wrote a financial column in the Bangkok Post, spoke in seminars of foreign exchange trading and formed numerous contacts in the business community. Among his interests were mines in Sierra Leone, companies in Australia, Belize, Canada, Cayman Islands, Russia, Thailand, Hong Kong, Israel, Cyprus and the Virgin Islands, and a number of Swiss bank accounts.

== Bangkok Bank of Commerce ==
In 1989, Saxena became advisor to Krirk-kiat Jalichandra, new senior vice-president of Bangkok Bank of Commerce. The bank tried hostile takeovers against many of the large Thai companies that traded publicly on the stock exchange. According to later investigation, it also gave cheap loans to various public officials and politicians in India, Russia, Thailand, Singapore, Saudi Arabia and Lebanon.

Bangkok Bank of Commerce collapsed in 1996 and the Bank of Thailand took it over. The collapse contributed to the Asian financial recession, economic and political crisis and the 1997 devaluation of the baht. Saxena was at his residence in Prague or Zurich at the time the story broke, and he never returned to Thailand.

In June 1996, Thai authorities charged Rakesh Saxena, Krikkiat Jalichandre, Rajan Pillai and Adnan Khashoggi and a number of other people with embezzling money estimated to be worth $US2.2 billion (or according to other estimates, $US88 million). Saxena himself had allegedly siphoned off £300 million in 1992–1993 through a string of derivative transactions. Saxena said that he was just an advisor and a trader and that the collapse of the real estate markets was the real trigger of the recession. His relationship with Russian tycoons and Arab sheikhs continues to be a subject of speculation.

== Detention in Canada ==
The Royal Canadian Mounted Police arrested Saxena on 7 July 1996, at Whistler, British Columbia, on behest of the Thai police. He was initially imprisoned for 2–3 days in a Canadian pre-trial centre. Saxena resisted extradition, claiming that he would be killed if he would return to Thailand.

In February 1998, Saxena was put on bail of $2.5 million because he was regarded as a flight risk. British Columbia Supreme Court overturned this ruling on 24 June 1998. This ruling allowed him to resist extradition in Vancouver, using his own guards in what amounted to a self-financed house arrest, costing him $40,000 per month. On 4 September 1998, Thailand asked authorities in 22 countries to freeze his assets, which, at the time, amounted to $135–300 million. Thailand also filed a civil suit against him.

In September 2005, the lower Canadian court ruled that Saxena should be extradited but the government of Canada did not enforce this ruling. Saxena further delayed his extradition with appeals. On 21 October 2005, the Canadian court postponed Saxena's extradition once again until January 2006.

On 3 March 2006, Saxena lost his B.C. Court of Appeal bid to overturn the federal justice minister's order that he be surrendered to Thai authorities, despite his contention that he could be killed or tossed in an inhumane prison cell in Thailand. Saxena's lawyer appealed. One of the possible reasons cited for him being released was the recent coup d’état in Thailand, which ousted the internationally recognized government, thus causing significant turmoil for the crown.

Saxena filed his appeal to the Supreme Court of Canada through the offices of Amandeep Singh, known for representing clients in such internationally intriguing cases as the Extradition of Omid Tahvili, a fugitive who was on the Interpol's Top Ten Most Wanted persons list and part of the defence of the Air India Bombing Trial.

On 29 October 2009, the Supreme Court of Canada denied Saxena's hearing request regarding a lower-court decision upholding his extradition. The Supreme Court gave no reason for its decision. Later that day, Saxena was turned over to Thai authorities and left Canada for Thailand.

== Business with Sierra Leone ==
A military coup ousted president Ahmad Tejan Kabbah of Sierra Leone in May 1997. Kabbah fled to Guinea and set up a government in exile. Around July 1997 he contacted British mercenary Tim Spicer of the Sandline International to organize a counter-coup. Saxena agreed to finance the countercoup in exchange for diamond exploration permits.

According to the British Parliament's Report of the Sierra Leone Arms Investigation, Saxena would raise the money so that Sandline could hire soldiers and buy equipment. In return, Kabbah would give Saxena's companies permits for diamond exploration and promises of further business. Saxena would pay Sandline for their operations. However, someone leaked the relevant documents to The Globe and Mail. In an interview the same year Kabbah denied knowledge of any negotiations with Saxena.

According to Spicer, who testified for the Report, Saxena did not give them the funds he had promised; reports have contradicted Spicer on this issue. Sandline bought more weapons from Bulgaria but they were too late – Nigerian-lead troops loyal to Kabbah had already seized the capital. As a result, Saxena did not receive the permits. Later British government investigation confirmed that Kabbah had not told the whole truth. In later interview Saxena claimed that he wanted to help for "ideological reasons" and the last thing on his mind was owning mines in Africa.

== General Commerce Bank ==
Rakesh Saxena was, until recently, allegedly fraudulently active in Britain (West Shore Ventures), South Africa in 2004 (Platinum Asset Management) and then Botswana (Investor Relations), South Africa (Phoenix Capital Partners), as the Sunday Standard and had revealed in August 2005. It is now known whether Saxena owned the African companies or not.

Adnan Khashoggi, Oleg Boiko, Rakesh Saxena, Amador Pastrana, and Regis Possino, a lawyer believed to be the chief architect of the General Commerce Bank transaction, together acquired General Commerce Bank, in Vienna, Austria, from where they allegedly organized international stock and bond deals. Associated with Possino were Sheman Mazur and Raoul Berthamieu, from the U.S. Possino and Khashoggi were credited with raising over $65 million for Genesis International, prior to the selling of the shares being halted by the SEC. Neither Possino nor Khashoggi were implicated in any wrongdoing in that regard.

Victims came from many countries, including Australia, Britain, and South Africa. Again Saxena's exact role has never been determined in many of these transactions. His name never showed up in any ownership documents. The Austrian government has not charged him with anything. One reason may well be that, in many instances, it is believed, that parties involved in international deals pay Saxena simply to have him on side. Saxena is not averse to shorting stocks. According to one of India's biggest power brokers, Chandraswami (also Nemi Chand Jain), Saxena is not averse to greenmail-type attacks on deals in progress, and due to his extensive knowledge of the markets (financial, economic and political), his reach is daunting, but his name is not on the paperwork. One senior Indian cabinet minister also alleged that Saxena is making options and futures prices on speculative Indian shares from offshore jurisdictions and that he is the price maker "of last recourse" for speculators in Mumbai.

Reports suggest that Saxena from his residence conducts several questionable and high-profile deals around the world, primarily deals in the exotic world of third world debt and derivatives; many such deals are, until now, outside the regulatory umbrellas and are likely to remain so for many more years.

Mr. Saxena and his company Westshore Ventures were sued by Pacific Energy & Mining Company and Tariq Ahmad of Reno, Nevada in the United States District Court for the District of Nevada for fraud and conspiracy to defraud Pacific Energy of over 1.5 million dollars. Pacific Energy had also filed a criminal complaint with the Federal Bureau of Investigation, however, the proceedings were stopped due to the extradition of Mr. Saxena to Thailand.

Since Mr. Saxena's extradition to Thailand, no additional securities frauds are known to have been perpetrated by Mr. Saxena.

== Recent developments ==
In August 2006, the Thai government set up a new team to seize the rest of Saxena's assets overseas, targeting those in Canada. Then Minister Chidchai Wannasathit ordered the Anti-Money Laundering Office and the Royal Thai Police to help the Attorney-General in this task. Canadian Appeals court denied his request for bail. [Bail was granted later].

Rakesh Saxena was also a defendant in number of Civil Lawsuits in United States, including in the United States District Court for the District of Nevada; he won those cases or those cases simply faded away.

=== Extradition to Thailand ===
On 31 October 2009, when the Supreme Court of Canada denied the final Appeal of Mr. Saxena, he was immediately handed over to Thai authorities who flew him to Thailand, where Saxena was on trial on fraud charges.

== Charges against Saxena ==
In India, Saxena has been accused of culpable homicide, extortion, uttering death threats and cheating in the death of biscuit tycoon Rajan Pillai. Those allegations were laid after the tycoon's widow accused Saxena and three others of conspiring to kill her husband. Pillai was introduced to Saxena by some prominent Indian power brokers, including Chandraswani. The tycoon's widow, former model Nina Pillai, was considered very close to Saxena by people who saw her often at Saxena's Bangkok residence. Former bank officials in Thailand have claimed that Nina Pillai continued to be financed by Saxena after her husband's death.

The Government of Thailand accuse Saxena embezzling $88 million from the Bangkok Bank of Commerce (BBC) and sought his extradition from Canada. The bank had separately filed civil proceedings against Saxena. He has filed a counter-suit.

The collapse of the BBC was one of the first dominoes in a financial crisis that spread across Asia, shaking the world economy in 1997. While some blame Saxena for sparking the inferno – The Wall Street Journal described him as the "Mrs. Leary's cow of the global financial crisis" – he is not facing court action on that score. He is also linked to some of the major hedge fund problems of the late 1990s, particularly problems linked to third world bonds and leveraged currency and interest rate derivatives on such bonds and to problems now associated with Russian and East Europe privatizations of the Yeltsin era.

No charges were laid in the ill-fated Sierra Leone affair. The British Parliament's Report of the Sierra Leone Arms Investigation concluded that the purchase of weapons with Saxena's money only technically broke a United Nations embargo and that Canada was not yet enforcing the embargo.
