= Sandline affair =

Political scandal

The Sandline affair was a political scandal that became one of the defining moments in the history of Papua New Guinea, and particularly the Bougainville conflict. It brought down the government of Sir Julius Chan, and brought Papua New Guinea to the verge of a military revolt. The event was named after Sandline International, a United Kingdom-based private military company.

== Background ==
After coming to power in mid-1994, Prime Minister Chan made repeated attempts to resolve the Bougainville conflict by diplomatic means. These attempts were ultimately unsuccessful due to the repeated absence of Bougainvillean leaders Francis Ona, Sam Kauona and Joseph Kabui at scheduled peace talks, arising from a deep mistrust of the PNG government and citing unresolved security concerns. In November 1994, Chan attempted to set up the Bougainville Transitional Government, under a moderate Bougainvillean, Theodore Miriung. However, this too was doomed to failure, as Ona, Kauona, Kabui and others all chose not to take part. This was the last straw for Chan, and he decided to resolve the conflict using military force.

== First meetings ==
Chan's defence minister, Mathias Ijape, requested logistical assistance from Australia and New Zealand, in preparation for an assault on the island. However, both nations refused to provide any military assistance. The decision was then made to investigate the use of mercenaries. Through some overseas contacts, Ijape was put in contact with Tim Spicer (an ex-Lt Colonel in the Scots Guards) who had recently founded Sandline International, a company specialising in providing arms, equipment, and contractors to participate in conflicts.

Spicer attempted to persuade the head of the Papua New Guinea Defence Forces (PNGDF), Jerry Singirok, to support the purchase of a package of military equipment that he had previously discussed with Ijape. Singirok dismissed the idea, and concentrated on proceeding with a planned assault on the island, codenamed "Operation High Speed II". However, the operation was a dismal failure, and within six days, Papua New Guinean forces had retreated from the island.

Later that year, Spicer met Chris Haiveta, the Deputy Prime Minister of Papua New Guinea, and convinced him of the benefits of using Sandline mercenaries to end the Bougainville conflict permanently, neutralise the Bougainville Revolutionary Army, and reopen the controversial Panguna copper mine. While Singirok still refused to deal with Spicer, Haiveta invited him to visit the country and make an assessment of the situation. He did so in December 1996, and received US$250,000 as a result. He estimated that Sandline mercenaries could do the job for a total of US$36 million.

== Official dealings begin ==
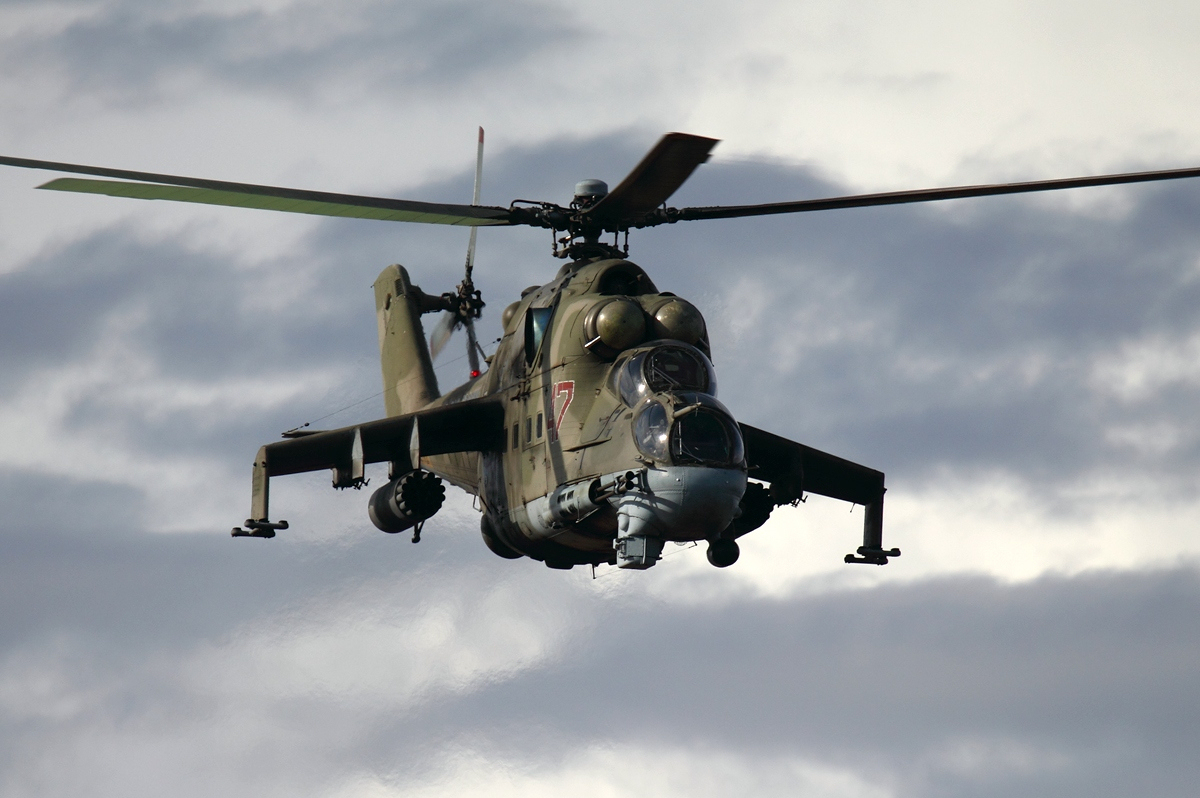
Mil Mi-24 helicopter similar to the ones brought by Sandline

On 8 January 1997, Tim Spicer had his first meeting with Prime Minister Chan. Spicer succeeded in convincing Chan that Sandline could assist in retaking Bougainville before the upcoming elections. They agreed that Sandline would provide 44 special forces personnel, mainly British, South African and Australian, to fight alongside PNGDF personnel. The US$36 million was never voted upon by the full Cabinet of Parliament, but instead by the secretive National Security Council. Half was to be paid up front, with the other half to follow after completion of the mission. The money came from cutbacks to a number of ministries, including the education and health departments.

Sandline had subcontracted most of its crew for the Bougainville mission through Executive Outcomes, a South African mercenary provider. The first mercenaries arrived on an Air Niugini flight from Singapore on 7 February 1997. After a week, a total of 44 had arrived, 8 from the UK, 5 from Australia and the remainder from South Africa.

In the meantime, a series of meetings were undertaken between Deputy Prime Minister Haiveta, Tim Spicer, and several other figures, with regard to buying out CRA's stake in Bougainville Copper, the owner of the Panguna mine, which was at the heart of the Bougainville conflict.

On 19 February 1997, Prime Minister Chan mentioned to Australian Foreign Minister Alexander Downer that Papua New Guinea was bringing in mercenaries for "training purposes". Downer condemned the move, and was particularly opposed to their use on Bougainville. On 10 February, the move was leaked to The Australian newspaper.

== Affair becomes public ==
The immediate public stir in Australia was larger than Chan had expected. The international furor also hardened the dislike that Jerry Singirok had for the Sandline deal. By the time he returned from a visit to the Philippines on 27 February, his mind was made up. He condemned the government for leaving him, as head of the Papua New Guinea Defence Force (PNGDF), out of the loop, and condemned the fact that Spicer had more access to the government than he did. Over the next week, he made plans for "Opareisen Rausim Kwik" (Tok Pisin: "get rid of them quickly"). On 8 March, he asked Major Walter Enuma to command the operation. Enuma agreed.

Over the next few days, the Australian government tried in vain to persuade the Papua New Guinean government not to proceed with the mercenary deal. On the night of 16 March 1997, the revolt began. PNGDF soldiers were approached by leaders of the NGO Melanesian Solidarity (MELSOL). Jonathan O'ata and Peti Lafanama wanted to consolidate a military-NGO civil protest against the Chan-Haiveta decision to engage the Sandline mercenaries. By the time the night was over, the entire band of Sandline mercenaries had been disarmed and arrested. Prime Minister Chan did not find out until the next morning. That morning, Singirok accused Chan, Ijape, and Haiveta of corruption, and gave them 48 hours to resign. He also fiercely denied allegations that he was aiming to take power himself. Chan refused to resign, and the same day, sacked Singirok as Commander of the PNGDF, replacing him with controversial Colonel Alfred Aikung. The NGOs activated a nationwide protest in support of General Singirok.

The weapons, including Mil Mi-24 helicopter gunships, piston engined light aircraft, military small arms and 600 crates of ammunition, were shipped in an Antonov An-124 Ruslan strategic airlift aircraft. The Antonov had been impounded in Thailand for a week after Papua New Guinea authorities refused to allow the aircraft to land. Australian diplomats and defence and intelligence chiefs had been involved in secret negotiations for days with Sandline and the governments of PNG and Thailand before agreeing to accept the weapons for storage in Australia. The Antonov was allowed to fly to Tindal RAAF base, near Katherine, Northern Territory, until the government of PNG arranged for the materiel to be returned to Sandline.

The two attack helicopters remained in storage at RAAF Base Tindal until 2016, when they were buried at the Shoal Bay Landfill site near Darwin due to their dilapidated condition and possible contamination, for example with asbestos, and the cost of shipping them anywhere.

== Military standoff begins ==
Singirok stated that he would accept the decision to fire him, and urged his soldiers to support his replacement. Chan told the media that Singirok had been neutralised and would be arrested. He also alleged that Singirok had attempted a coup, but had not had his men's support behind him. However, Chan's optimism turned out to be premature. The soldiers at the central Murray Barracks began to disobey orders, and police units had to be flown in from outside of the capital, Port Moresby. Two days later, a boycott of classes began at the University of Papua New Guinea in support of Singirok. Crowds of civilians blocked the roads around the barracks, and bomb hoaxes closed down government departments.

Chan still continued to insist that he was in complete control, and accused Singirok of a plot to manipulate the price of copper. The following day, the protests turned somewhat violent, and looting began. The situation grew darker for Chan when Governor-General, Sir Wiwa Korowi, took out a newspaper advertisement that also accused the government of widespread corruption. Another two days saw Port Moresby almost grind to a halt.

The protests continued to get larger with each day, and the police and the army faced off against each other, with the army under Major Enuma's strict orders to hold their positions and the police appeared in no hurry to confront the army. Enuma also instructed the army to halt the looting. The Australian government sent emissaries to Port Moresby, and threatened to withdraw financial aid altogether if the Sandline deal was not cancelled. Reluctantly, Chan cancelled the deal and announced an inquiry. While this meant that Singirok and Enuma had accomplished one of their major goals, they continued to demand the resignation of Chan, Ijape and Haiveta. On 21 March, all Sandline's personnel, with the exception of Tim Spicer, who remained to give evidence to the enquiry, were withdrawn from Papua New Guinea.

Despite the cancellation of the Sandline contract, the security situation continued to slip further out of the government's control. The Acting Commander, Alfred Aikung was attacked and his vehicle was burned. Aikung subsequently fled into hiding fearing for his life. Chan considered asking for foreign military intervention, but Aikung advised him against it. Speaker of Parliament and former Prime Minister Sir Rabbie Namaliu met with Chan and Singirok, and advised the latter that two of his demands had been met, but that Chan would resign only at the request of Parliament.

== Prime Minister Chan resigns ==
The next session of Parliament began on 25 March, and Bill Skate, then Governor of Port Moresby, was ready to bring forth a motion calling on Chan to resign. On the night of 24 March, several members deserted the Chan government, and the capital once again came to a standstill. Soldiers at Murray Barracks demanded to be able to march on the Parliament, but Enuma steadfastly refused. Large crowds began to gather outside the Parliament. The police attempted to stop students from reaching the Parliament, but the soldiers escorted them in. Inside, Sir Michael Somare amended Skate's motion, so it only called upon Chan to step down for the period of the inquiry. A fierce debate ensued, with the Parliament divided. In the end, Chan realised that his position was hopeless. He spread the word inside the Parliament that if members supported him, he would resign anyway. The Parliament voted against the motion.

The crowd outside, upon hearing of the news, began to riot. They had not heard that Chan planned to resign anyway. The police advised parliamentarians to remain inside the Parliament, as they could not be safely evacuated. Chan and Haiveta had to be disguised and then raced out in a police car. All through the night, the standoff continued, with the parliamentarians fearing that they would be arrested. Though many soldiers continued to demand to move in on the building, Enuma resisted his soldiers, and convinced them to remain in their positions. He also addressed the Parliament, assuring them that there was not going to be a military coup. Enuma attempted to order the soldiers back to barracks and the crowds to disperse, but they remained until Parliament began sitting again the following morning. That morning, Chan sacked both Ijape and Haiveta then resigned himself.

Bill Skate, who had moved the motion against Chan, replaced him as Prime Minister on 22 July after a Federal election, (Giheno took on the acting PM role up until 2 June, where Chan was again raised to the PM for his last six weeks of term). Under Skate, the peace process continued, and within a year after the Sandline affair, a treaty was in place, which as of 2004, remains intact.

A number of inquiries into the affair followed. Jerry Singirok was reappointed to his previous position as head of the PNGDF in 1998, but was dismissed again in 2000 over charges stemming from the incident. However, in April 2004, Singirok was formally acquitted of all charges laid against him over the events of February and March 1997, notwithstanding that he had been found to have received illicit payments from J&S Franklyn, a UK arms dealer, paid into a secret account at Lloyds Bank in the UK, as first reported by Mary-Louise O’Callaghan in The Australian newspaper.

Chan was later acquitted on corruption charges relating to the Sandline affair.
