= Task Force ODIN =

United States Army aviation battalion

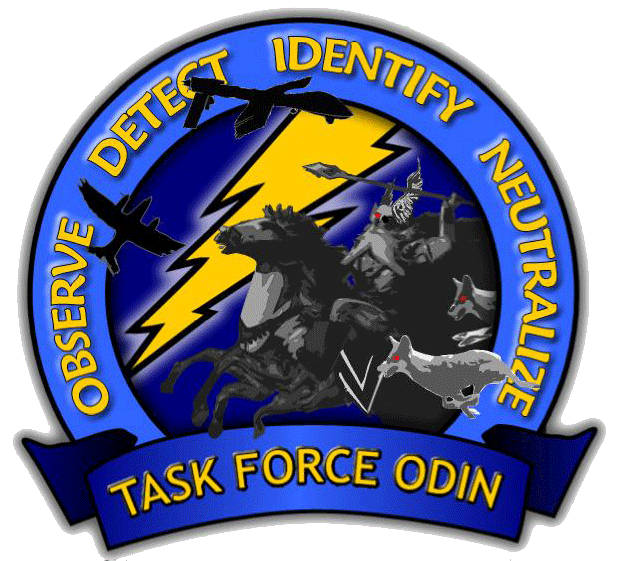
Task Force ODIN uniform patch

Task Force ODIN, whose name is an acronym for observe, detect, identify, and neutralize, is a United States Army aviation battalion created in August 2006 to conduct reconnaissance, surveillance, and target acquisition (RSTA) operations to combat insurgent operators of improvised explosive devices in Iraq.

The unit was formed in Texas, and first deployed in October 2006. An Army article says the unit is meant to meet "the critical requirement to 'win back the roads' using Army Aviation assets to maintain a persistent stare over demonstrated at-risk areas for IEDs." The United States Army stood up TF ODIN as a Quick Reaction Capabilities project whose efficacy proved so effective it shaped the Secretary of Defense Directive to establish the Air Force Project Liberty and other ISR related missions.

ODIN is the Army's only unit that flies the MQ-1B Warrior-Alpha unmanned aerial vehicle. Built by General Atomics Aeronautical Systems, the extended-range multi-purpose hybrid UAV has an advanced sensor package incorporating electro-optical sensors, including FLIR, and synthetic aperture radar together with a laser rangefinder and a laser designator, the latter for "painting" targets for strikes with Hellfire missiles and laser-guided bombs.

By September 2007, the Warrior-Alpha had flown more than 6,000 hours and had contributed to the killing of 3,000 insurgents in Iraq.

The task force trains operators for active, reserve, and Army National Guard. These analysts work with every type of unit including the military's top secret units.

Task Force ODIN received a Meritorious Unit Commendation (Army) for their work with the 25th Infantry Division.

The Army established a sister, TF ODIN-A, unit in Afghanistan. After "Operation New Dawn" (OND), TF ODIN was temporarily positioned in an undisclosed location until further movement into Afghanistan to combine both TF-ODIN and TF-ODIN-A as TF-ODIN-E Operation Enduring Freedom. There are many sub-divisions in the task force: Highlighter, Desert Owl and Night Eagle to name a few.

On 23 February 2009, Task Force ODIN performed the first MQ-1B Warrior-Alpha combat missile launch.

According to General David Petraeus in August 2010, during the previous 90 days in Afghanistan information provided by ODIN had resulted in the killing or capture of 365 militant leaders, detained 1,335 insurgent foot soldiers, and killed another 1,031 Taliban.

As of May 2019, MAG Aerospace continues to help the U.S. military fight the Taliban in Afghanistan as part of Task Force ODIN under the Army's Medium Altitude Reconnaissance and Surveillance System (MARSS) program.
