= John Birch (diplomat) =

British diplomat (1935–2020)

Sir John Allan Birch KCVO CMG (24 May 1935 – 6 May 2020) was a British diplomat who was knighted in 1993. He was Ambassador to Hungary until his retirement in 1995.

== Diplomatic career ==
Birch was educated at Leighton Park School and Corpus Christi College, Cambridge. He joined the Foreign Office in 1959 and was posted as Third Secretary to Paris in 1960. Subsequently, he went as Second Secretary to Singapore in 1963, to Bucharest in 1965 as First Secretary and to the United Nations Office at Geneva in 1968. He was Head of Chancery in Kabul in 1973 before returning to London in 1976 to attend the Royal College of Defence Studies. He was then posted back to Geneva as Political Adviser to the UK delegation for the negotiation of a Comprehensive Nuclear Test Ban Treaty. He moved in 1980 to Budapest as Counsellor/Head of Chancery. From 1983 to 1986, he served at the FCO as Head of the Eastern European Department before being posted to New York as the UK's Deputy Permanent Representative to the UN (with the personal rank of Ambassador). In 1989, he was appointed Ambassador to Hungary. He was knighted KCVO on the occasion of Queen Elizabeth II's state visit to Hungary in May 1993.

== Post-retirement ==
Birch was Director of the British Association for Central and Eastern Europe from 1995 to 2004. He was Vice–Chairman of the Council of University College London, Chairman of the Advisory Board of the School of Slavonic and East European Studies and a member of the Royal Institute of International Affairs. He was a non-executive Director of the private security firm AEGIS, having previously served on the AEGIS Advisory Council.

== Personal life and death ==
Birch married Primula Clare Haselden in 1960. They had three sons (1962, 1963 and 1969) and one daughter (1967).

John Birch died from cancer on 6 May 2020, aged 84. Lady Birch died on 2 April 2026, aged 91.
