= Infestum =

Belarusian Black Metal Band

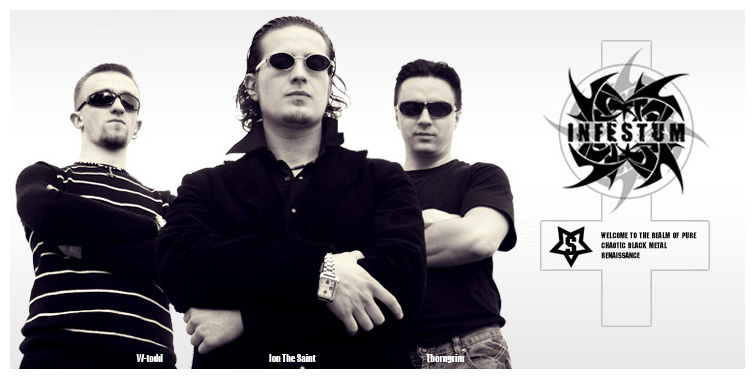
- Infestum, 2009

Background information
- Origin: Minsk, Belarus
- Genres: Black metal, Pagan metal
- Years active: 2000–present
- Labels: Battle Hymn Records; More Hate Productions; Blood Fire Death Productions
- Members: Ion the Saint; Thorngrim; W-todd
- Past members: Grond; Divine Skald; Burglar; A\Vesh
- Website: infestum.com

Infestum is a Belarusian black metal band, formed in 2000 in Minsk. Early works of Infestum had elements of Pagan metal, but the band later changed its style to a black metal sound. Russian label More Hate Productions considers this band one of the most respectful bands from ex-USSR black metal scene.

== Biography ==
=== Early years (2000–2003) ===
Infestum was formed in June 2000 by Grond as drummer and Skald as guitarist. Afterwards, Ion joined Infestum on vocals and Thorngrim joined on bass. With this line-up, Infestum started to create their music. They also played the songs of bands such as Sepultura, Mayhem, Venom, and Bathory at their rehearsals. In the winter of 2000–2001, Infestum recorded their first demo, which was called "Infestum" and contained five songs. The song "Secha (Slashing)" begins with sounds like a battle, horses galloping, axes, screams, and a martial rhythm. As Ion said in the interview to "Eternal Hate" webzine, "Our history, battles of the past and battles in our minds are fundamental in our creation".

In winter 2000–2001, Infestum recorded a full-length album, which was called "Last Day Before the Endless Night". It had four re-recorded songs from the demo album, alongside newly introduced songs.

=== "Ta Natas" (2003–2007) ===
In 2003 Infestum starts work on a new album "Ta Natas". As Ion said it should have been "more dense and tough music in all senses than previous works", and Skald described this album as a "total bedlam". Album material was changed very long time unless it was released in 2007 by German label Blood Fire Death Productions. It has been dedicated to the memory of Alyona Zimnitskaya (16.10.1981 — 19.09.2006). This album was void of folk elements and gained new expressive vanguard forms. Black metal was complemented witch symphonic elements and synthesizer play. The album also featured artwork by Valdmar Smerdulak who had a great experience in creating that kind of stuff for bands at that time. With changing the style of music the band changes its appearance also. They don't wear chain armour anymore at their concerts but prefer more severe style of wearing. Two music videos were filmed at that period: "Razor To Throat" and "Ta Natas". Bass player Thorngrim was engaged in creating music videos. "Razor To Throat" was very popular on metalvideo.com portal and ranked in top 10 of the portal chart. A young girl took credit in this video. Her name was Nokturna. She acted naked in that video. "Ta Natas" has frames with a lot of human skulls. That frames were taken from the documentary about Sedlec Ossuary (a place of interests in Czech Republic). "Ta Natas" was met by critics in different ways but most of reviews were positive or neutral. A lot of metal web-sites assessed "Ta Natas" with marks above medium. "This album is full of anger, pain and despair", one of the critics said. Another critic said: "the band manages to combine darkness, despair and melody and I think that that is worth a compliment, as not many bands succeed in that!". Some critics found that the lack of this album was too over-processed, forced and screamed vocals.

=== Later years (2007 – present) ===
In 2009 A\Vesh and Burglar left the band. Guitarist Wrathtodd (ID:vision), a friend of the band, joined Infestum afterwards. In spring 2010, Infestum released the internet single "Void of Nebulae" and later the EP "Renaissance", which contained five compositions.

== Line-up ==
- Ion the Saint — vocals (2000)
- Wrathtodd — guitar, keyboards (2009)
- Werwolfe - bass (2012)
- Forneus - drums (2012)

=== Former members ===
- Divine Skald — guitar (2000–2007)
- Grond — drums (2000–2001)
- Burglar — drums (2001–2009)
- A\Vesh — guitar (2007–2009)
- Thorngrim — bass, keyboards (2000-2012)

== Discography ==
- 2001 — Infestum (EP)
- 2002 — Infestum (MCD, Battle Hymn Records)
- 2003 — Last Day Before The Endless Night (CD, More Hate Productions)
- 2007 — Ta Natas (CD, Blood Fire Death Productions)
- 2010 — Void Of Nebulae (single)
- 2010 — Renaissance (EP)
- 2014 — Moments of Exalted (CD, Lacerated Enemy Records)
- 2018 — Les Rites de Passage (CD, Lacerated Enemy Records)

== Videography ==
- 2007 — Razor To Throat
- 2007 — Ta Natas
