= Omid Tahvili =

Iranian con artist

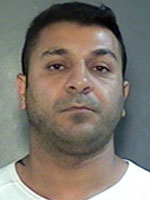
- Tahvili's mugshot in 2005
- Born: 31 October 1970 (age 55); Kermanshah, Iran
- Disappeared: November 2007
- Other names: Omid Roshan; Omid Roushan; Nino
- Status: At large
- Convictions: Kidnapping; sexual assault (2005, Canada)
- Criminal charges: Wire fraud; mail fraud; telemarketing fraud; aiding and abetting (2003, U.S. nationwide)
- Penalty: 11 years in imprisonment (2007, Canada)

Tahvili Organization
- Territory: Canada, Los Angeles
- Ethnicity: Iranians
- Membership: dozens of members and associates
- Activities: drug trafficking, extortion, fraud, scamming
- Allies: Pakistani mafia, Indian mafia

Omid Tahvili (Persian: امید تحویلی; born on 31 October 1970, in Kermanshah, Iran) is an Iranian-Canadian sexual offender and kingpin of an organized crime group in Canada that is connected to various international crime organizations. In April 2008, Forbes.com, after consulting with law enforcement agencies around the world, listed him as one of the world's ten most wanted fugitives.

== Criminal activities ==
=== Drugs ===
According to the Royal Canadian Mounted Police (RCMP), Tahvili came to Canada from Iran in 1994. In November 2000, he was arrested with his brother-in-law for possession of 3 kilograms (6.6 lb) of cocaine, in a joint operation between the Vancouver Police and the RCMP. Tahvili was found not guilty. By 2003, the RCMP recognized Tahvili as heading up one of the main criminal organizations operating out of an Iranian community in Canada. At that time, dozens of Iranian expatriates were working under him.

=== Fraud ===
From 1999 to 2002, he ran a fraudulent telemarketing business that targeted people in the United States, stealing approximately US$3 million from hundreds of victims, most of them elderly. A federal arrest warrant was issued for Tahvili on January 30, 2003 by the U.S. District Court, Central District of California, where he was charged with mail fraud, wire fraud, telemarketing fraud and aiding and abetting.

Tahvili was arrested in British Columbia on an extradition warrant and was eventually ordered extradited to the United States of America by the British Columbia Supreme Court on May 4, 2007. Tahvili had been represented by Canadian criminal and extradition lawyer Amandeep Singh, known for his representation of high profile and controversial international clientele such as billionaire banker fugitive Rakesh Saxena. Tahvili appealed his extradition order to the British Columbia Court of Appeal and was awaiting his appeal when he absconded from the pre-trial facility where he was held.

== Escape and conviction ==
In 2005, Tahvili discovered that Can$300,000 of his organization's drug money went missing, and suspected that a courier who worked for him stole it and fled to Vietnam. Tahvili kidnapped the man's brother-in-law, sexually assaulted him, and interrogated him over several hours. The man was eventually let go and Tahvili was arrested soon after. Since July 2005, Tahvili had awaited trial in the maximum-security North Fraser Pretrial Centre in British Columbia until he escaped in November 2007 after bribing a Corrections Officer named Edwin Ticne. A closed-circuit-television video showed Tahvili leaving the Pretrial Centre wearing a janitor's uniform and being led through a series of locked doors by Ticne, and escaping through the front door. Tahvili subsequently received an 11-year sentence in absentia. On August 8, 2008, Ticne was sentenced to three years and three months in prison.

Tahvili has connections throughout Canada, Europe and the Middle East, and remains an international fugitive.

== See also ==
- List of fugitives from justice who disappeared
