= Defion Internacional =

Private Military Contractor based out of Lima, Peru

Defion Internacional is a Lima, Peru based Private Military Company that recruits and trains security personnel, logistics personnel, administrative personnel and professional services personnel to provide worldwide services. It has offices in Dubai, Philippines, Sri Lanka and Iraq. Their main contracts have been with Triple Canopy, Inc. and the U.S. Department of State involving the war in Iraq. They employ static guard forces, logistical and administrative professionals along with English professors for their American contracts.

== Controversy ==
=== Contracts ===
Defion Internacional recruits, vets and trains (when needed) personnel on a global level for different companies.

Defion Internacional came on the personnel services scene by recruiting and training security guards for Triple Canopy contracts, involving the war in Iraq. These contracts have placed up to 3,000 security guards in the Green Zone in Baghdad. Some guards were paid as little as $1000 a month. The security guards were also provided with transportation, housing, food, medical care and life insurance. Triple Canopy no longer uses Defion's personnel services.

=== Investigations ===
The Secretary of Foreign Relations in Peru, Ambassador Jorge Lazaro, met with Defion President/CEO Mr.Juan Manuel Duran and Vice President M. Villacruces, two of Defion Internacional's representatives, to investigate. The Ambassador says that there are loop holes in the Peruvian laws which allows their citizens to work abroad as security guards in a conflict zone. A United Nations working group also visited Peru and interviewed Mr. Duran.

Contracts before these with the U.S. involving traveling to the sites had been reviewed and publicised by the media at the time and the Peruvian travelers were being advised by Ministry of Foreign Affairs specialists. There have not been any complaints from the Peruvian government or the workers. The media in Peru interviewed security guards returning from Iraq and the security guards reported being pleased with the work and the majority have returned to work for their third year.

Juan Manuel Duran says that the security guards work in the Green Zone, and at the time of the reports, the bombings and attacks had occurred outside of that area; accordingly, none of the hired Peruvians were affected. The Andean Commission of Jurists director, Enrique Bernales Ballesteros, says that the contracts are illegal due to United States' laws, and that the Geneva Convention prohibits the hiring of people to involve them in foreign conflict. However, this claim was refuted by constitutional lawyers in a subsequent a Congressional investigation.

== Recruiting and training ==
According to the company's website, they provide jobs under 6 month-1 year contracts in the Middle East. The jobs consist of personal guards, drivers, static guards, static supervisors, logistics supporters, and English teachers. For most of these jobs at least "level 3 or 4" English speaking abilities are required. The company's administrative manager, Alejandro Fernandez, says "A Peruvian in Baghdad will not panic if he has to face a blast or a blackout because he has already experienced that on the streets of Lima". Although most of the training is done on site, Triple Canopy had trained security guards at a local military base in Peru in Huachipa but after controversy with the location, Defion took over training security guards at their company headquarters where they can accommodate up to 150 students in their classrooms. The Peruvian Army was paid $127,690, or 435,840 soles by Triple Canopy for training total of 678 people.
