= Constellis Group =

American private military contractor

- Type: Private
- Industry: Private security services contractor
- Predecessors: More than 7, including Blackwater, Constellis and Triple Canopy
- Founded: June 2014; 12 years ago
- Founders: Craig Nixon (Note: From Blackwater); Tom Katis (Note: From Triple Canopy); Matt Mann
- Area served: Worldwide
- Products: Law enforcement training, logistics, close quarter training, and security services
- Services: Security management, full-service risk management consulting
- Website: constellis.com

Constellis Group is an American private military contractor founded in June 2014 after a merger between Blackwater, Constellis and Triple Canopy. Blackwater was originally founded in 1996 and gained controversy for its activities in Iraq, including the Nisour Square massacre in 2007.

== History ==
=== Pre-2014 ===
Blackwater Lodge and Training Center, Inc. was formed on December 26, 1996, by Al Clark and Erik Prince in North Carolina, to provide training support to military and law enforcement organizations. In explaining its purpose, Prince stated: "We are trying to do for the national security apparatus what FedEx did for the Postal Service."

Triple Canopy was incorporated in 2003 in Chicago, in response to the September 11 attacks. The firm received its first contracts in 2004, following the invasion of Iraq, to help guard and equip allied forces in the war zone, especially for the Coalition Provisional Authority.

=== 2014–present: Constellis Holdings ===
A merger between Triple Canopy and Academi, along with other companies that were part of the Constellis Group package, are now all gathered under the Constellis Holdings, Inc. umbrella. The transaction brought together companies including Triple Canopy, Constellis Ltd., Strategic Social, Tidewater Global Services, National Strategic Protective Services, Academi Training Center, and International Development Solutions.

In 2015, six Colombian mercenaries reportedly employed by Constellis were killed in Yemen, led by an Australian commander hired by the United Arab Emirates to fight the Houthi insurgency.

In 2016, Houthi sources claimed that Tochka missile strikes killed over 120 coalition mercenaries in Ma'rib, including 11 foreign Blackwater commanders. Another reported strike later that month at Al Anad Air Base allegedly killed 200 Sudanese fighters and their commander, identified by some sources as a U.S. Colonel.

In September 2016, Constellis was acquired by Apollo Global Management.

In early 2020, Constellis entered debt restructuring talks after missing a $1 billion debt payment and agreeing to a forbearance with creditors. The company’s financial difficulties followed a decline in overseas contracts and higher startup costs on new domestic work.

Constellis relocated its global headquarters to Herndon, Virginia in February 2020.

== Board of directors ==
- John Ashcroft
- Dean Bosacki
- Jason DeYonker
- Bobby Ray Inman
- Jack Quinn
- Russ Robinson

== Services and products ==
Constellis has a variety of services and product offerings.

=== United States Training Center ===
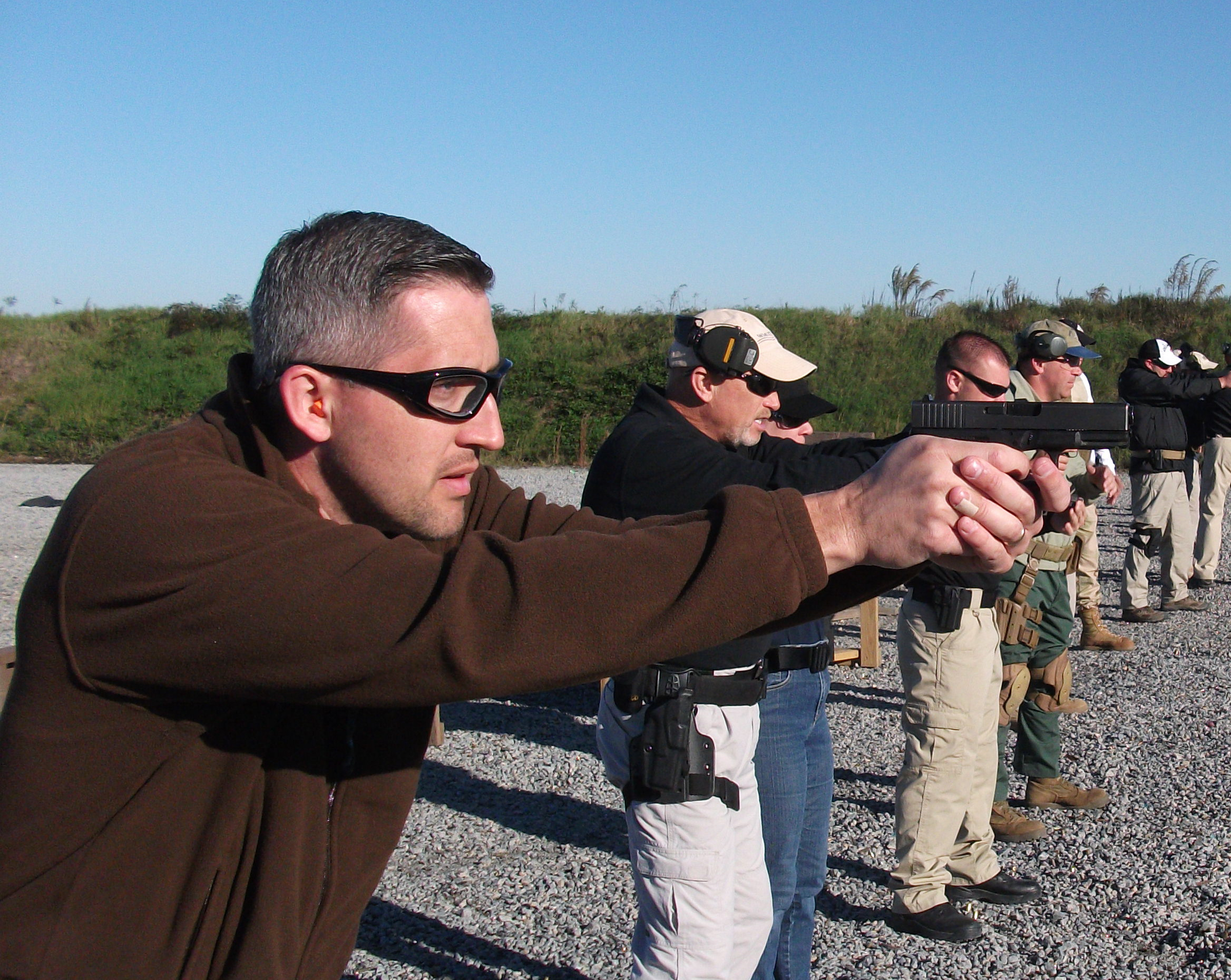
Shooters take part in firearms training held at the U.S. Training Center in Moyock, North Carolina

United States Training Center (USTC, formerly Blackwater Training Center) offers tactics and weapons training to military, government, and law enforcement agencies. USTC also offers several open-enrollment courses periodically throughout the year, from hand to hand combat (executive course) to precision rifle marksmanship. They also offer courses in tactical and off-road driving.

USTC's primary training facility, located on 7,000 acres (28 km^{2}) in northeastern North Carolina, comprises several ranges, indoor, outdoor, urban reproductions, a man-made lake, and a driving track in Camden and Currituck counties. Company literature says that it is the largest training facility in the country. In November 2006, Blackwater USA announced it acquired an 80-acre (32 ha) facility 150 mi (240 km) west of Chicago, in Mount Carroll, Illinois, to be called Blackwater North. That facility has been operational since April 2007 and serves law enforcement agencies throughout the Midwest. The training facility has since been renamed Impact Training Center and then again renamed Hollow Training Center.

In 2011, the Pentagon contracted USTC to provide "intelligence analyst support and material procurement" for NATO in the ongoing Afghan drug war.

==== Maritime security service ====
Academi offers tactical training for maritime force protection units. In the past, it has trained Greek security forces for the 2004 Olympics, Azerbaijan Naval Sea Commandos, and Afghanistan's Ministry of Interior. Academi's facilities include a man-made lake, with stacked containers simulating the hull and deck of a ship for maritime assaults. Blackwater received a contract to train United States Navy sailors, which was managed by Jamie Smith, following the attack on the USS Cole. It also purchased a 183-foot (56 m) vessel, McArthur, which has been outfitted for disaster response and training. According to Blackwater USA, it features "state of the art navigation systems, full GMDSS communications, SEATEL Broadband, dedicated command and control bays, helicopter decks, hospital and multiple support vessel capabilities". McArthur was built in 1966 by the Norfolk Shipbuilding and Drydock Company and served as the survey ship USC&GS McArthur (MSS 22) for the United States Coast and Geodetic Survey from 1966 to 1970, and then as NOAAS McArthur (S 330) for the National Oceanic and Atmospheric Administration from 1970 until her decommissioning in 2003. The ship is home-ported in Norfolk, Virginia.

==== Canine training ====
The company trains canines to work in patrol capacities as war dogs, explosives and drug detection, and various other roles for military and law enforcement duties.

==== Security consulting ====
Blackwater Security Consulting (BSC) was formed as a Delaware LLC in December 2001 and was the brainchild of Jamie Smith, a former CIA officer who was the Founding Director as well as acting Vice President of Blackwater USA. The company, based in Moyock, North Carolina, is one of the private security firms employed during the Iraq War to guard officials and installations, train Iraq's new army and police, and provide other support for coalition forces.

The company was started to help train SEALS for combat. However, in the aftermath of 9/11, civilian security teams were needed by the United States Military.

Before 2001, tier-one contractors, or former members of elite, special forces units, were hired from a small pool of applicants. After the September 11 attacks, Cofer Black, the former head of counter terrorism at the CIA, requested that the federal government hire more contractors to operate overseas. Eventually, the CIA realized that a large number of civilian contractors would be needed overseas to accomplish its broad goals. The federal government turned to Blackwater for assistance. Jamie Smith and his deputy David Phillips recruited, vetted and hired a 21-man team. This team was then trained and deployed on a Top Secret project to provide protection for CIA personnel and facilities in Afghanistan. Jamie Smith and Erik Prince deployed with the team to Afghanistan. The two then deployed to the Pakistani border as a two-man element providing security assistance in one of the most dangerous places in the country at the time. Prince stayed there for one week and was in Afghanistan for a total of two weeks, leaving Smith and the remainder of the team to continue to carry out the mission.

By 2003, the ground war in Iraq changed into a diplomatic mission, demanding hundreds of diplomats and State Department employees. The government traditionally handles its own security, but it lacked the staff for high-risk protection details. Therefore, a different type of protection was needed, and Blackwater would provide the solution. Blackwater's founder, Erik Prince, says that "not one State Department employee was killed while we were protecting them".

Academi's primary public contract is from the U.S. State Department under the Bureau of Diplomatic Security's Worldwide Personal Protective Services (WPPS) and WPPS II umbrella contracts, along with DynCorp International and Triple Canopy, Inc., for protective services in Iraq, Afghanistan, Bosnia, and Israel.

In December 2025, Immigration and Customs Enforcement contracted Constellis to provide skiptracing services.

=== Products ===
==== Target systems ====
Academi provides and maintains a "shoot house" system and patented the BEAR multi-target training system that was designed and developed by the company. Blackwater Target Systems company was managed by Jim Dehart and the company was largely responsible for keeping Blackwater Training Center financially solvent until the creation of Blackwater Security Company by Smith.

==== Cougar (MRAP) ====
Force Protection Inc in early 2005 provided the first Cougar Security Vehicle (SV) to Blackwater USA for use as a transport vehicle for U.S. Provisional Coalition Authority officials in Baghdad.

==== Grizzly armored vehicle ====
Academi operates and markets its own armored personnel carrier, the Grizzly APC.
