= Asguard (band) =

Belarusian metal band

- Origin: Mogilev, Belarus
- Genres: Melodic death metal, gothic metal, industrial metal
- Years active: 1997–2009
- Labels: Metalism Records
- Members: Alexander Afonchenko; Andrey Tselobenok; Oleg Maslakov; Sergey Tselobenok; Mikhail Kopychko
- Past members: Yuri Yurchenko; Sergey Nickolaenko; Alexander Krotov; Sergey Tsvikevich; Tatjana Lazarjkova; Andrey Polovchenia; Dmitriy Laptenok

Asguard was a Belarusian heavy metal band from Mogilev, active between 1997 and 2009. Their music contains elements of melodic death metal, gothic metal and industrial metal.

== History ==
Asguard was formed in the autumn of 1996, in Mogilev, Belarus, with original members Alexander Afonchenko, Andrey Tselobenok and Alexander Krotov. In late 1999 and into early 2000, the band had written and recorded their first official debut entitled Summis Desiderantess Effectibus for the Ukraine label Bloodhead Productions.

=== Dreamslave... Awakening ===
The recording of Dreamslave... Awakening was planned for the end of spring. The album was recorded, mixed and mastered in Freedman Studio.

== Members ==
Current members

- Alexander Afonchenko – vocals, bass
- Andrey Tselobenok – guitar
- Oleg Maslakov – guitar
- Sergey "Dead" Tselobenok – drums
- Mikhail Kopychko – keyboards, electronics

Former members

- Yuri Yurchenko – drums on "In the Darkness of the Night", "Summis Desiderantes Effectibus" & "Wikka"
- Sergey Nickolaenko – keyboards on "Black Fire Land"
- Alexander Krotov – guitar on "In the Darkness of the Night"
- Sergey Tsvikevich – keyboards, orchestral arrangement on "Dreamslave"
- Tatjana Lazarjkova – cello on "Dreamslave"
- Andrey Polovchenia – vargan, bagpipe and surma on "Dreamslave"
- Dmitriy Laptenok – keyboards, electronics

== Discography ==
=== Studio albums ===
Title	Label	Released
Black FireLand	DevilDoll Rec/More Hate Prod	2003
Wikka	This Dark Reign Records	2004
Dreamslave	This Dark Reign Prod./CD-Maxim	2005
Dreamslave... Awakening	This Dark Reigh Records	2007

=== EPs ===
Title	Label	Released
In the Darkness of the Night	Fatal Ecstasy Prod	1998
Summis Desiderantes Effectibus	Bloodhead Prod	2000
