= Jason DeYonker =

American businessman

Jason DeYonker is an American businessman.

== Biography ==
=== Early life ===
He graduated from the University of Michigan, with a Bachelor of Business Administration in Finance and Accounting.

=== Career ===
He started his career at the Arthur Andersen Corporate Finance Group. He then worked at Deloitte's Corporate Finance Group.

He is the Managing Partner of Forté Management, specializing in financial business management, and the Founder and Managing Partner of Forté Capital Advisors, a private equity firm. From 1998 to 2002, he managed Erik Prince's financial portfolio. He led the buyout of Xe Services (formerly known as Blackwater), now known as Academi. He helped expand the United States Training Center of Academi in Moyock, North Carolina and negotiated its first training contracts with the United States federal government. He sits on its board of directors as well as Box Services, The Wall Group, Inc., L'Wren Scott Fashion, and Serge Normant Professional.
