= Torleif Aasgaard =

Norwegian businessperson

Torleif Aasgaard (29 April 1888 – 20 June 1953) was a Norwegian businessperson.

He was born in Kristiania as a son of Carl Johan Johnsen Aasgaard (1854–1929) and Anna Marie Jensen. He was a younger brother of judge Reidar Aasgaard. In 1914 he married teacher's daughter Alette Hesselberg.

He finished his secondary education in 1906 and graduated from Kristiania Technical School in 1909. He then spent some time in England and Germany to study the steel industry. His father owned and led the metal manufacturing company C. Geijer & Co, and Torleif Aasgaard was hired as manager in 1911. He later took over the company, as chief executive and chairman. Leadership was passed on to Tor and Iver Aasgaard in 1952.

He played football for SFK Lyn, and later chaired the club. He served as the first chairman of Oslo District Association of Skiing. He was also a board member of Jern- og Metallvarefabrikantenes Landsforening from 1939 to 1948. He died in June 1953 and was buried at Vår Frelsers gravlund.
