= Rubicon International Services =

British security company

- Industry: Private military and private security
- Founded: 1996; 30 years ago
- Founder: John Davidson
- Fate: Acquired by Aegis Defence Services in 2005
- Headquarters: London, United Kingdom
- Area served: worldwide
- Parent: Aegis Defence Services

Rubicon International Services Ltd is a British private military and private security company based in London, which was acquired by Aegis Defence Services on 28 October 2005. The public announcement was made on 4 November 2005. John Davidson, Managing Director of Rubicon, joined the Aegis board and assumed the appointment of Director of Operations.

Rubicon International Services was founded in 1996 by John Davidson, a former special forces soldier. Before its 2005 acquisition by Aegis Defence Systems, it operated in more than 50 countries. Rubicon provides security services in high-risk areas, such as protecting foreign workers in Iraq during the Iraq War.

The other shareholder was Paddy Nicoll, who sold his security systems consultancy, Diplomatic Protection Ltd, to Rubicon in 2000. Paddy Nicoll retired from the Army in 1996, having served with the Black Watch.
