= Asgaard (game show) =

- Genre: Game Show
- Created by: Benjamín Salinas; Roberto González
- Written by: Armando Gracia, Francisco Puente, Jorge Hill.
- Starring: Luis Ibar (Galas); Fran Meric (Laya); Hernán Mendoza (Yrm); Marco Antonio Argueta (Enolo); Roberto Castañeda (Trasgo); Sadi Lenín (Sadi)
- Narrated by: Chuby
- Country of origin: Mexico
- Original language: Spanish
- No. of seasons: 3
- No. of episodes: 20

Production
- Producer: Roberto González (general producer)
- Running time: 60 minutes
- Production company: TV Azteca

Original release
- Network: Azteca 13
- Release: July 27, 2008 – September 11, 2009

Asgaard is a TV Azteca game show broadcast every Sunday at 7:00 pm on Azteca 13. The first broadcast was on July 27, 2008.

Contestants compete to win ounces of silver in the competition. Silver pieces gives contestants more control over the game as well as being a take-home prize themselves. The program has been designed to have an atmosphere notably influenced by the Norse mythology and the culture of northern Europe.

== Structure of the program ==
=== Synopsis ===
According to the fictional description on the home website:

Asgaard was a magical and fantastic world, a world where hags, mages, and fauns lived in harmony. But one day the evil forces of Mork took control of our world and now only the union of the two races of human beings will be able to bring it back into harmony. ...
From there then the inhabitants of Asgaard started a quest to find the greatest warriors, who have to survive tests that go beyond their imagination... and so some day the world of the gods will be saved. In the meantime we are only able to hope...
The time has come and the moment of the battle rises. Come and visit the world of Asgaard.

=== Gameplay ===
The game is divided into adventures in which the contestants, called "warriors," prove their capabilities and determination. Two teams of two members compete to test their bravery, strength, and ability, under a time limit. The form is similar to a role-playing game, the participants using bracelets that join to activate the aleatoric watch, to give them the power to move forward through the game. The spaces are divided into two types.

- blue spaces, presented by the Viking Yrm, that reveal benevolent challenges;
- red spaces, presented by Trasgo, consist of traps with greater difficulty, or punishments. In these spaces players can double, triple, or quadruple the amount of silver ounces that they have the power of a watch, but this only if they obtain the prize; if not, they have to pay the cost.

The two teams represent "Laoth" and "Kaoth", gods of the Sun and darkness (the Moon). These give the players protection during their collection of the silver ounces.

The team that reaches the final space first receives the number of ounces that they have accumulated, and the possibility of competing in the final.

=== Characters ===
- Galas, played by Luis Ibar is a mage who began the search for warriors of the human race to help liberate Asgaard from the age of darkness in which it is now found. Only humans can manipulate the ounces without being affected by their enormous power.
- Laya, played by Fran Meric is the queen of the fairies. Worried for her world, she has decided to ally herself with Galas in a search for warriors so that Asgaard will not disappear.
- Yrm, played by Hernán Mendoza is a powerful Viking with strong but friendly character. He is charged with presenting the blue spaces and will make the warriors prove their mettle. This character almost always speaks with the help of Enolo.
- Enolo, played by Marco Antonio Argueta is an able warrior, little known amongst the inhabitants of Asgaard. Many years ago he abandoned the lands below to live completely alone in the mountains. His race is naturally warlike, and he is considered one of the fiercest.
- Trasgo, played by Roberto Castañeda is allied against the world of Asgaard. He is charged with presenting the red spaces and will give the players an evil turn that they have to complete to obtain ounces. His helper, Sadi, always accompanies him.
- Sadi, played by Sadi Lenín, is Trasgo's helper, and always dresses in a medieval hood.
- Mork, played by Guadalupe Mora, is the real villain of the show.

== Production ==
The son of Ricardo Salinas Pliego, Benjamín Salinas, debuted as producer and writer of the original idea. He told the story with the design assistance of Roberto González, Pablo Dávila and Pablo Azuela.

== Influences ==
- Mork of the god of the orcs within the fictional universe of the videogame Gorkamorka.
- The name of the program is one of multiple variants of Asgard, the mythical abode of the Norse gods.
- Trasgo is a type of goblin known in Spanish culture.
