= Jorge Scientific Corporation =

Jorge Scientific Corporation is an American private military company with its headquarters located in Arlington, Virginia, providing counter insurgency and intelligence, secure logistics and technology, advanced cyber network infrastructure, analysis and program management services to U.S. defense, Intelligence and federal civilian government customers. The firm has additional offices in the U.S.A and Afghanistan.

== History ==
The company was established in 1986 by Judith Jorge Hartman, the founder and chairman. Founded as a small business in 1986, Jorge Scientific has grown into a company with nearly 300 employees working at sites around the world. In 2009, Chris Torti joined Jorge as the company's President and CEO.

== Services ==
Jorge Scientific claims it provides "mission-critical national security solutions" to the U.S. armed forces, intelligence communities and federal civilian agencies. The firm provides adaptive support focused on counterinsurgency and intelligence, secure logistics and classified technology, cyber defense, advanced infrastructure, legal analysis and program management. The company has four major units, including the Vital Missions Group, the Essential Logistics Group, the Cyber Solutions Group and the Special Analysis Group.

== Controversy ==
The company made international headlines in October 2012 when two former employees leaked a video to ABC News showing key personnel at the company drunk or under the influence of narcotics during parties that were allegedly thrown “every other day” at the Jorge Scientific operations centre in Kabul.

The video primarily showed the security manager downing large quantities of vodka, while the medical officer, Kevin Carlson, was in an incoherent state after injecting himself with ketamine. Employees John Melson and Kenny Smith worked as armed security officers for three and five months, respectively, in Kabul as part of a $47 million contract Jorge Scientific had under the U.S. Legacy Program to train the Afghan National Police in counter-insurgency efforts. Both men say they quit the company in disgust and out of concern that their own safety was being compromised by the behavior they describe. "It was going against everything that we were trying to do over there," said Melson.

Furthermore, much of this behaviour was done while personnel were armed and had loaded weaponry on them. A full scale external investigation has been instigated by Jorge.[3]

In a statement from Jorge President and CEO Chris Torti, the company addressed the allegations of misconduct.
