= Russ Robinson =

American heir and businessman

Russ Robinson is an American heir and businessman.

== Biography ==
=== Early life ===
His father was Jerome Robinson (1929–2009), the founder of U.S. Zinc and a prominent philanthropist in the Houston, Texas community. He graduated from Vanderbilt University in Nashville, Tennessee in 1979.

=== Career ===
From 1979 to 2002, he was chief executive officer of the family company, U.S. Zinc, and sold it to Imco Recycling. From 2002 to 2004, he was chief executive officer of Metaleurop, French-German publicly owned company specializing in zinc and lead. In 2006, he founded Steel Dust Recycling and sold it to Zinc Nacional in 2009. In 2010, he founded Global Steel Dust, a global steel dust recycling company headquartered in Switzerland. He is its chief executive officer. The company has ongoing steel dust recycling plants projects in Saudi Arabia and South Korea. It recycles steel dust and produces crude zinc oxide for further reprocessing by zinc smelters.

He sits on the board of directors of Academi.
