= Asgaard – German Security Group =

German private military company

- Industry: Security company
- Founded: 2007
- Headquarters: Telgte, Germany
- Key people: Dirk Gaßmann (CEO)
- Services: Security
- Revenue: 60.000 Euro
- Number of employees: 5 (Not including field agents)
- Website: www.asgaardgsg.de

Asgaard – German Security Group (founded in 2007) is a German private military company.

In May 2010, Asgaard secured a contract with Somali politician Ahmad Galadid Abdinur Darman, which in turn sparked controversy in Germany. According to spokespersons for the German Institute for International and Security Affairs and the Düsseldorf Institute for Foreign and Security Policy, Darman was a politically unimportant player in Somalia, whose political clout might change considerably if he acquired armed security. That over a hundred former German soldiers would begin to play a part in Somali politics led to discussion in the German Bundestag. Politicians spoke of a "fall from grace," but there appeared to be little that could be done, since the German government had for years neglected to draw up rules for private military companies.

In June 2010, the chairman of the Reservist Association of the Bundeswehr, major Gerd Höfer, wrote a letter to Asgaard manager Thomas Kaltegärtner and asked him to resign from the association. Kaltegärtner was a staff sergeant in the reserve.

== Literature ==
- Dirk Laabs: Public enemies in uniform. How militant rights subvert our institutions . Ullstein book publishers, Berlin 2021, ISBN 978-3-430-21032-4
