= Mark Rippetoe =

American strength coach (born 1956)

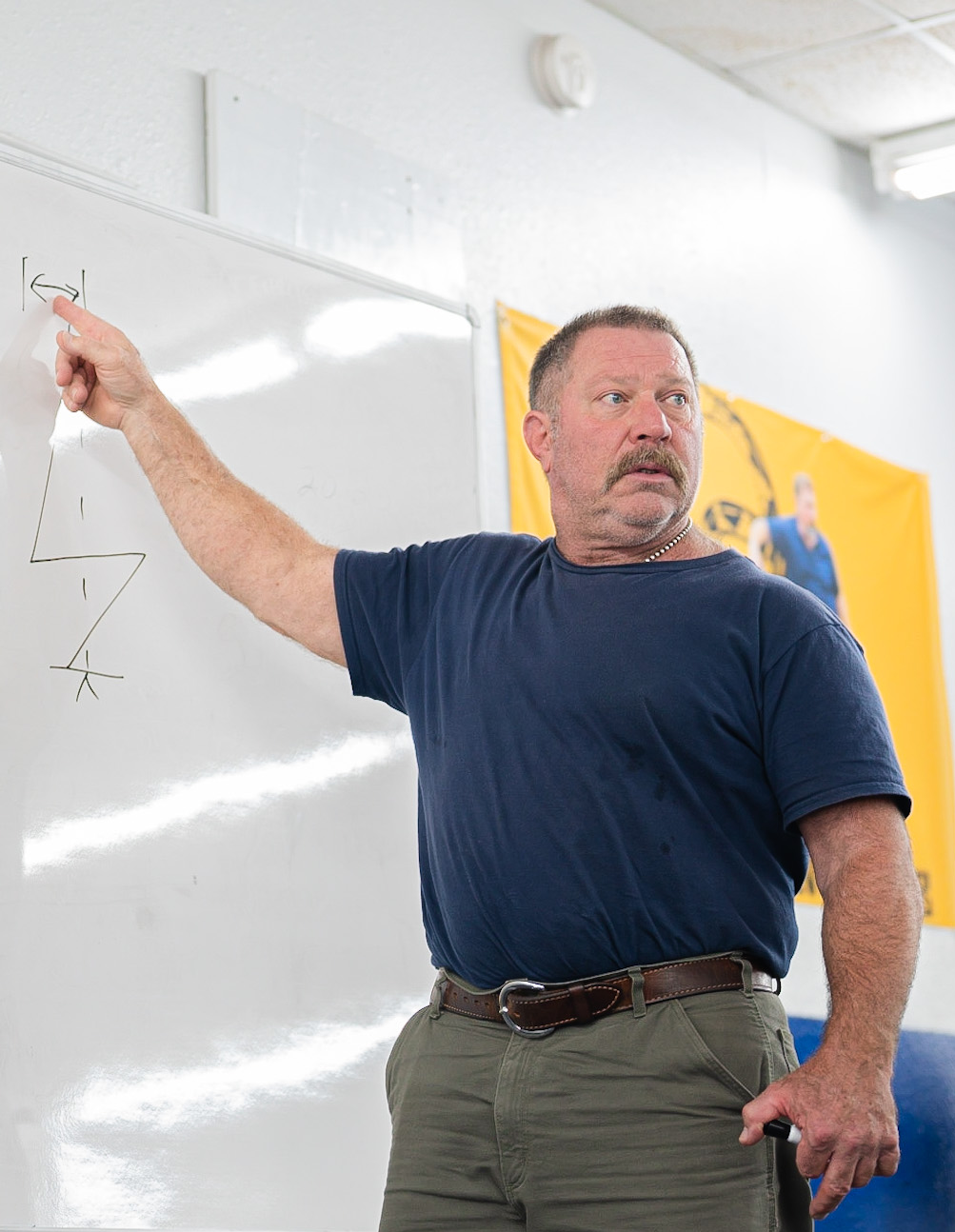
- Rippetoe in 2019
- Born: Charles Mark Rippetoe; February 12, 1956 (age 70); Wichita Falls, Texas, U.S.
- Education: Midwestern State University (BS)
- Organizations: Starting Strength; Wichita Falls Athletic Club
- Notable work: Starting Strength: Basic Barbell Training; Practical Programming for Strength Training
- Website: startingstrength.com

Charles Mark Rippetoe (born February 12, 1956) is an American strength training coach, author, former powerlifter, and gym owner. He is best known for his barbell training program, the subject of his book Starting Strength: Basic Barbell Training. Rippetoe is known for his brash teaching style and humor, prompting several online compilations of his attributed quotations.

== Early life and education ==
Rippetoe was born in Wichita Falls, Texas, the son of Charles and Judy Rippetoe. Charles, a former U.S. Army paratrooper who parachuted into Normandy in World War II, owned a diner in Wichita Falls. Rippetoe earned a Bachelor of Science degree in petroleum geology from Midwestern State University, where he met his mentor, weightlifter Bill Starr, in 1979. Rippetoe competed in powerlifting from 1979 to 1988, winning the 198-pound class at the Greater Texas Classic in 1981.

== Career ==
Rippetoe bought Anderson's Gym in Wichita Falls in 1984, which he renamed the Wichita Falls Athletic Club. He used the WFAC to test and refine his barbell training program, culminating with the publishing of the first edition of Starting Strength: Basic Barbell Training, co-authored with Lon Kilgore, in 2005. The Starting Strength program focuses on building strength with compound lifts—the squat, deadlift, press, bench press, and power clean—and a limited number of assistance exercises, such as chinups. In collaboration with Glenn Pendlay and Kilgore, Rippetoe also established the USA Weightlifting Regional Development Center in Wichita Falls.

In 1985, Rippetoe was a part of the charter group of individuals to receive the Certified Strength and Conditioning Specialist certification when it was first offered by the National Strength and Conditioning Association. He formally relinquished the credential in 2009. Rippetoe was also formerly associated with the CrossFit community as a subject-matter expert in barbell training. He authored many training articles for the CrossFit Journal and created, with Lon Kilgore, the Basic Barbell Certification course, which they conducted from 2006 to 2009. After he ended his formal association with CrossFit in 2009, he expanded this course into a three-day Starting Strength Seminar produced through the Aasgaard Company.

Beginning in 2018, the Aasgaard Company established a national franchise gym chain of Starting Strength branded gyms which feature the use of basic barbell equipment and the Starting Strength method.

== Authored works ==
Rippetoe has authored several books, peer-reviewed articles, online and DVD instructional videos, and internet posts concerned with strength training.

=== Books ===
- Starting Strength: Basic Barbell Training (editions 1, 2, 3)
- Practical Programming for Strength Training (editions 1, 2, 3)
- Strong Enough? Thoughts on Thirty Years of Barbell Training
- Mean Ol’ Mr. Gravity

=== DVDs ===
- Starting Strength: Basic Barbell Training

=== Journal articles ===
- "Strength and conditioning for fencing", Strength and Conditioning Journal
- "Let's Learn How to Coach the Squat", Strength and Conditioning Journal
- "Redefining Fitness for Health and Fitness Professionals", Journal of Exercise Physiology
- "Going Deep", CrossFit Journal
