= Triple Canopy =

American security contractor

Triple Canopy, Inc.
- Type: Subsidiary
- Industry: Security & risk management consulting, private security, defense contracting
- Headquarters: Herndon, Virginia, United States
- Services: Security management, risk management, crisis management, full-service risk management consulting
- Revenue: Unknown
- Net income: Unknown
- Number of employees: 94,000+ (2024)
- Parent: Constellis (2011–present; bought by Apollo Global Management in 2016); Apollo Global Management (2016–present; ultimate financial owner)
- Website: www.constellis.com

Triple Canopy, Inc. was an American private security company and private military company (PMC) that provides armed security, mission support, and risk management services to corporate and government clients. The firm was founded in May 2003 by United States Army Special Forces veterans, including former Delta Force operators. In June 2014, the firm merged with rival security contracting firm Academi, formerly Blackwater, to form Constellis Group, with Craig Nixon, the former CEO of Academi, becoming the CEO of Constellis Group, and training facilities being consolidated at the existing Academi training facility in North Carolina. It was staffed by, among others, a number of former Army Special Operations personnel, Green Berets, Rangers, SEALs, MARSOC Raiders, other special operations personnel, and several law enforcement officers. At the time of the merger, over 5,000 employees were working for Triple Canopy.

== Company overview ==
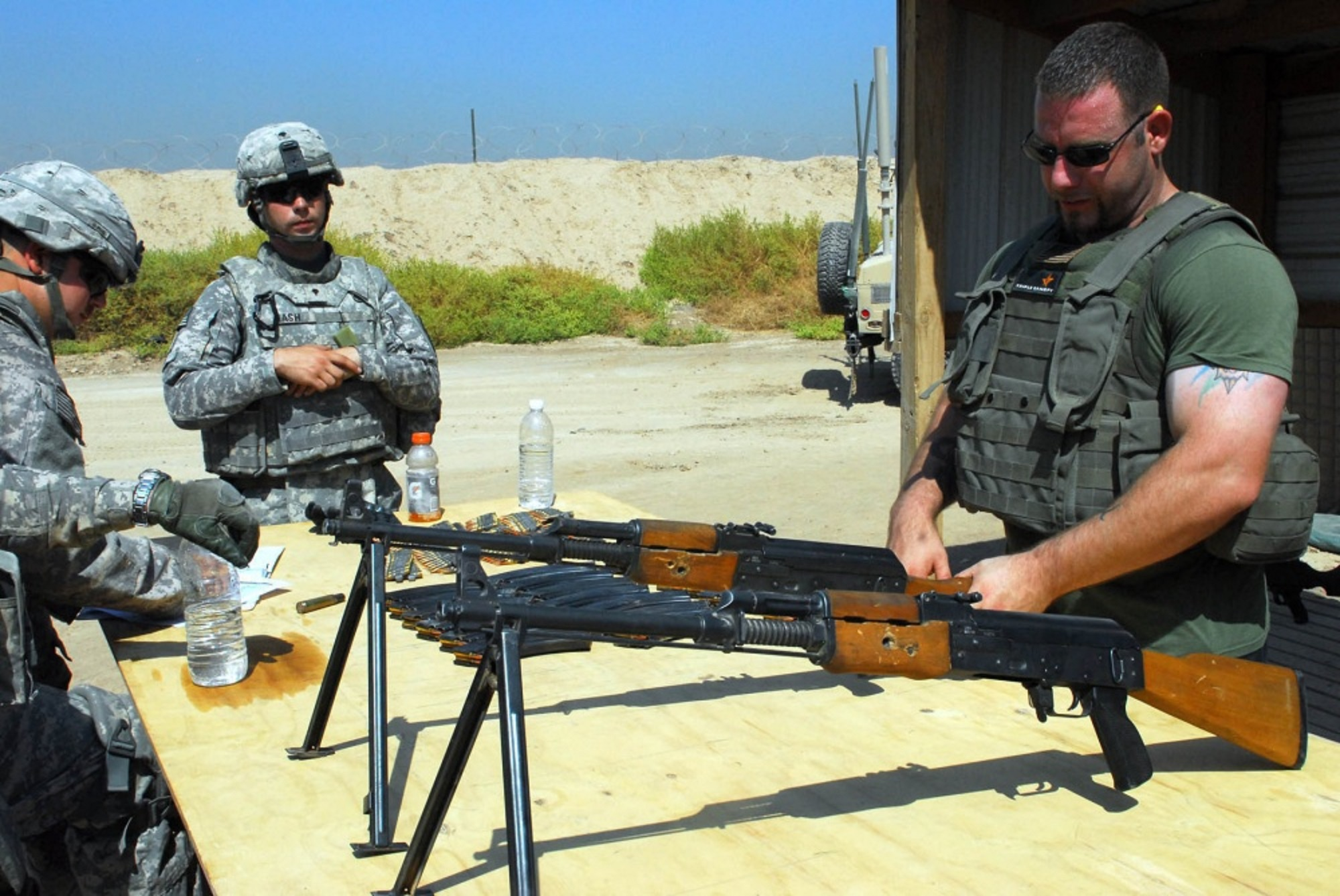
A Triple Canopy contractor giving a marksmanship class on the RPK to U.S. Army soldiers, 2011

Triple Canopy was incorporated in Chicago but maintained its headquarters in Reston, Virginia. It provides security services on a contract basis, most notably to clandestine government agencies. A review of Triple Canopy operations in Iraq conducted by the United States Office of the Inspector General (OIG) stated that the firm's personnel were a "well-trained, professional work force with significant prior experience" in military special operations and law enforcement.

The name "Triple Canopy" was initially chosen to refer to the layered canopies in the jungles where some of the key founding members received training. The name also refers to the distinction among U.S. Army personnel wearing the Airborne, Ranger, and Special Forces tabs, if authorized, when assigned to Special Forces units.

=== Key personnel ===
Triple Canopy's leadership included former Delta officers, industry analysts and asset management experts, and consultants. They included:

- Tom Katis, Co-Chairman
- Matt Mann, Co-Chairman
- Gregory 'Mo' Mulligan, President
- Matt Luckett, Director
- Jay Christy, Chief Operating Officer
- Tom Magnani, Chief Financial Officer
- Juliet Protas, Senior Vice President and General Counsel

=== History ===
In 2003, in response to the security-industry market growth spawned by the September 11, 2001 terrorist attacks, Army Special Forces veterans Matt Mann and Tom Katis decided to establish a business focused on countering international terrorism. They applied their knowledge of military activities to “train government agencies in anti-terrorism techniques.” The firm received its first contracts in 2004, following the invasion of Iraq, to help guard and equip allied forces in the war zone, especially for the Coalition Provisional Authority.

In the years following, Triple Canopy won additional State Department contracts, among others, to provide security services at some of the highest-risk U.S. embassies around the world. This work was performed under the Worldwide Personal Protective Services contract issued by the State Department, valued at up to $1 billion for the handful of companies assigned a share of the work.

Triple Canopy also assisted in humanitarian operations, including rushing aid and supplies to Haiti in 2010 following a catastrophic earthquake.

In November 2010, around 60 private security firms that were established in war zones promised to cut back their use of force, improve vetting and training of personnel as well as reporting any infringements of law. Triple Canopy was included in this agreement as well as the large British company G4S.

Parent company Constellis was sold to Apollo Global Management in August 2016.

== Iraq ==
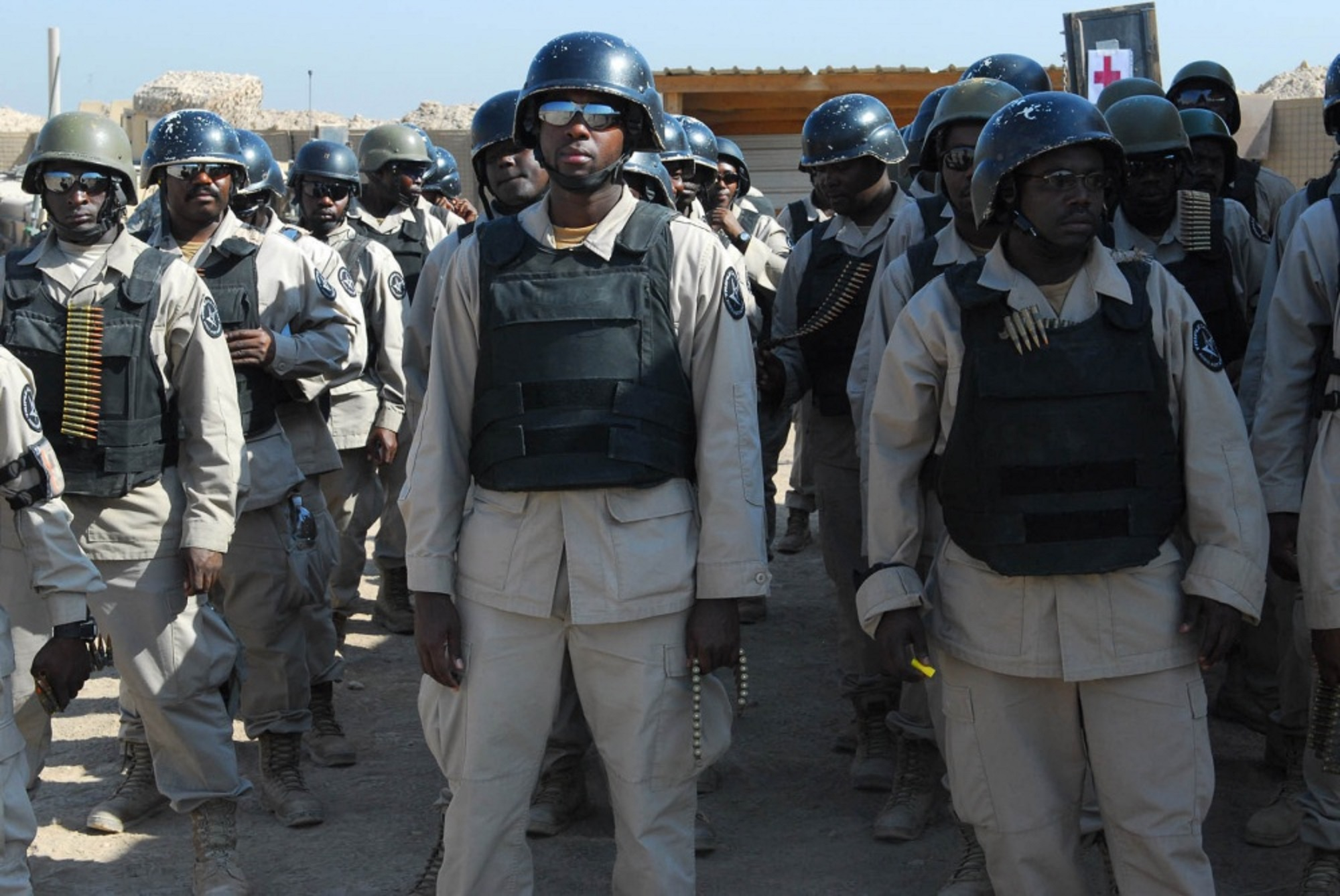
Ugandan Triple Canopy contractors undergoing training in Iraq, 2011

Triple Canopy was known principally for providing security in Iraq, particularly for guarding Coalition Provisional Authority headquarters throughout the country. In April 2009, contracts in Iraq handled by Blackwater USA, then under investigation for rule-breaking and violence, were assigned by the State Department to Triple Canopy. Previously, Triple Canopy had been responsible for contracts outside of Baghdad, whereas those contracts the firm took over were mainly based in Baghdad.

In addition to security roles, Triple Canopy was involved in Iraq in other ways, sponsoring the Iraq Energy Expo and Conference to assist in rebuilding the nation.

=== Casualties ===
Routinely operating in war zones and other dangerous locations, Triple Canopy occasionally suffered personnel losses. In September 2005, four Triple Canopy team members were killed, along with 13 others, when a bomb exploded on a street in Basra, Iraq. A rocket attack in July 2010 on Baghdad's heavily fortified Green Zone killed three Triple Canopy personnel and wounded 15 more.

Adam Hermanson, an employee of Triple Canopy and a U.S. Air Force veteran, died September 1, 2009, after apparently being accidentally electrocuted while showering in his quarters at a company installation inside Baghdad's protected Green Zone. Hermanson's family has alleged that faulty wiring was to be blamed and have claimed the company has not been fully forthcoming about details of the incident.

=== Wrongful termination suit ===
Triple Canopy fired two contractors working in Iraq, in 2006 for their failure to properly report, in a timely manner, that their supervisor fired on a civilian vehicle in Iraq. The supervisor, also terminated, denied the allegations. The two subsequently filed a lawsuit against the company alleging wrongful termination. On August 1, 2007, a jury in Fairfax County Circuit Court ruled in favor of Triple Canopy. On appeal, the Virginia Supreme Court overturned that ruling and ordered a new trial, saying that the judge had given the wrong instructions to the jury in the original trial. The parties reached a settlement out of court. The terms were not disclosed.

== Code of conduct involvements ==
According to Triple Canopy, the firm "participated in the effort to establish an international code of conduct since the development of the Montreux Document in 2006, and even provided the company's Code of Conduct to the Swiss government as a source document." In June 2010 testimony before the Commission on Wartime Contracting in Iraq and Afghanistan, CEO Ignacio "Iggy" Balderas expressed the firm's support for a “system of private security contractor certification by third parties.”

The result of these efforts was the development and adoption of International Code of Conduct for Private Security Service Providers, and Balderas spoke at the signing ceremony in Geneva, Switzerland in November 2010. Balderas: "Our next steps are to ensure that the Code gains worldwide acceptance and becomes an integral part of how the industry operates and how governments and clients select security providers. We must also work to ensure that transparency, oversight and accountability accompany the Code so that the full extent of its intent is shown."

== Clayton Consultants ==
In 2007, Triple Canopy acquired Clayton Consultants, Inc., a crisis management security consultancy offering incident response, security consulting and training services. According to the firm's website, it "specialize[d] in the prevention and resolution of kidnaps for ransom, extortion, malicious product tampering, wrongful detention, maritime security, workplace violence and client risk" and was especially active on the U.S.-Mexico border. Clayton Consultants has also been hired to help handle problems of piracy in the Gulf of Aden.
