= Sandline International =

British private military company

- Type: Private military security firm
- Industry: Private military and security contractor
- Defunct: 2004
- Headquarters: London, England
- Key people: Tim Spicer; Simon Mann
- Products: Law enforcement training, logistics, Close quarter training, and security services
- Services: Security management, full-service risk management consulting

Sandline International was a private military company (PMC) based in London, established in the early 1990s. It was involved in conflicts in Papua New Guinea in 1997 and had a contract with the government under then-Prime Minister Julius Chan, causing the Sandline affair. In 1998 in Sierra Leone Sandline had a contract which ousted the President, Ahmad Tejan Kabbah and in Liberia in 2003 was involved in a rebel attempt to evict the then-president Charles Taylor near the end of the civil war. Sandline ceased all operations on 16 April 2004.

On the company's website, a reason for closure is given:

The general lack of governmental support for Private Military Companies willing to help end armed conflicts in places like Africa, in the absence of effective international intervention, is the reason for this decision. Without such support the ability of Sandline to make a positive difference in countries where there is widespread brutality and genocidal behaviour is materially diminished.

Sandline was founded and managed by retired British Army Lieutenant Colonel Tim Spicer. Sandline billed itself as a PMC and offered military training, "operational support" such as equipment and arms procurement and limited direct military activity, intelligence gathering, and public relations services to governments and corporations. While the mass media often referred to Sandline as a mercenary company, the company's founders disputed that characterisation. A commercial adviser for Sandline once told the BBC that the firm saw themselves differently from mercenaries, stating that they were an established entity with “established sets of principles” and that they employed professional people. He reiterated that the firm would not accept contracts from groups or governments that would jeopardise its reputation.

Spicer recounted his experiences with Sandline in the book An Unorthodox Soldier.

== See also ==
- Aegis Defence Services
- Executive Outcomes
- Simon Mann

== Bibliography ==
- Pelton, Robert Young (1 September 2006). Licensed to Kill, Hired Guns in the War on Terror. Crown. ISBN 978-1-4000-9781-4.
- Spicer, Tim (2000). An Unorthodox Soldier. Mainstream Pub Co Ltd. ISBN 1-84018-349-7.
- Singer, P. W. (2003). Corporate Warriors, The Rise of the Privatized Military Industry. Cornell University Press. ISBN 0-8014-8915-6.
- Bilton, Michael (2 July 2000). "The Private War of Tumbledown Tim". Sunday Times Magazine.
