= Aegis Defence Services =

British private military company

- Type: Private
- Industry: Private military and security
- Founded: 2002
- Founders: Tim Spicer; Mark Bullough; Jeffrey Day; Dominic Armstrong
- Headquarters: London, United Kingdom
- Area served: Worldwide
- Key people: Nicholas Soames (Chairman)
- Products: Defence services
- Services: Military and security services
- Website: www.aegisdefence.uk

Aegis Defence Services was a British private military and private security company with overseas offices in Afghanistan, the United Arab Emirates, Iraq, Saudi Arabia, Libya, Somalia and Mozambique. It was part of the Aegis Group of companies, which includes Aegis LLC, which was based in the United States. It was founded in 2002 by Tim Spicer, who was previously CEO of the private military company Sandline International; Jeffrey Day, an entrepreneur; and Mark Bullough and Dominic Armstrong, former investment bankers.

It was a founding signatory of the International Code of Conduct for Private Security Providers, inaugurated on 9 November 2010, a 'Swiss government convened, multi-stakeholder initiative that aims to both clarify international standards for the private security industry operating in complex environments, as well as to improve oversight and accountability of these companies.' It was a founding member of the British Association of Private Security Companies (BAPSC), a body lobbying for the regulation of the British PSC sector, which is now defunct. It is also a member of the Private Security Company Association of Iraq.

In October 2015 Aegis was taken over by Canadian security company GardaWorld.

== Aegis in Iraq and Afghanistan ==
In Iraq, Aegis is under contract (worth $293 million over three years) to the United States Department of Defense to provide security support services to the Project and Contracting Office (PCO), responsible for managing the reconstruction program. These services include:

1. Providing static and mobile security details for the PCO and United States Army Corps of Engineers;
2. Maintaining situational awareness of logistical movement and reconstruction security operations;
3. Facilitating intelligence–sharing between security forces and reconstruction contractors; and,
4. Providing continuous information on the viability of road movement throughout the country.

Through its charitable foundation Aegis conducts a self-funded civil affairs programme to facilitate reconstruction in areas where there are gaps in mainstream projects. It also provides expatriate–led and Iraqi–staffed Reconstruction Liaison Teams to monitor the progress of reconstruction work subcontracted to Iraqi building companies.

In separate contracts, Aegis is engaged in providing security protection to the inquiry into alleged corruption in the Oil-for-Food Programme. It provided security support to the UN Electoral Assistance Division (UNEAD) and the Independent High Electoral Commission (IECI) facilitating both the constitutional referendum to proceed in October 2005 and the general election in December 2005.

In May 2011, it was announced that U.S. military was to pull out of Baghdad, in the air and ground, and to be replaced by eight companies including Aegis and DynCorp International to take over security operations.

In 2011, Aegis was awarded a $497 million contract by the U.S. Department of State for assuming security forces operations at the U.S. Embassy in Kabul, Afghanistan. The Guardian newspaper reported that from 2011 onwards Aegis "broadened its recruitment" to include African countries, including Sierra Leone. Security guards recruited from Sierra Leone were paid only $16 (£11) a day.

== Trophy videos ==
On 27 October 2005 a number of "trophy" videos showing private military contractors in Baghdad firing upon civilian vehicles with no clear reason discernible from the footage itself sparked two investigations after they were posted on the internet. The videos were linked unofficially to Aegis Defence Services. Both the US Army and Aegis conducted investigations into the video; while the Aegis report is closed for client confidentiality reasons, the US Army enquiry concluded that the contractors involved were operating within the rules for the use of force. More4 News broadcast extracts of the videos in March 2006. The video showed Matthew Elkin (former U.S. Army Ranger and lead security contractor) denouncing the contractors and ordering a cease fire. Aegis benefited from CPA-mandated immunity from prosecution by Iraqi authorities.

On 6 April 2006 More4 News reporter Nima Elbagir identified disaffected former Aegis contractor Rod Stoner as responsible for posting the videos on the website. Aegis would not confirm that its contractors were involved in the incidents shown in the videos, but obtained a High Court injunction to have Stoner's website closed down. In the same More4 program, Labour MP Jeremy Corbyn insisted that the Pentagon's contract with Aegis Defence Services should be suspended until the matter had been properly investigated and fully reported upon.

== Acquisition ==
On 28 October 2005 Aegis acquired Rubicon International Services Ltd, a longstanding provider of corporate and other executive private security services. The public announcement was made on 4 November 2005. John Davidson, managing director of Rubicon, joined the Aegis board and became director of operations.

In July 2013, the Aegis chief executive was former Major General Graham Binns, who served in the Prince of Wales's Own Regiment of Yorkshire, which became the 1st battalion of the Yorkshire Regiment in 2006, and was the Colonel of the Yorkshire Regiment. The chairman of the Aegis board of directors was former Defence minister Nicholas Soames MP.

On 13 July 2015, GardaWorld announced the acquisition of Aegis Defence Services to expand its strategic expansion in Africa and the Middle East. The acquisition was completed on 12 October 2015 for $130,725,000 plus an earnout amount.

Following the acquisition, former Aegis Defence Services co-founder and head of Aegis Risk Advisory (the intelligence arm of the company), Dominic Armstrong, founded strategic intelligence firm Herminius.

== See also ==
- Espionage
- Counterespionage
