= Susan L. Burke =

American lawyer (born 1962)

- Born: July 30, 1962 (age 63); Würzburg, Germany
- Education: Georgetown University (BS); Columbus School of Law (JD)
- Occupation: Lawyer

Susan L. Burke (born July 30, 1962) is an American lawyer noted for her work to reform the military system of prosecuting rape and assault and in representing plaintiffs suing the American military or military contractors, such as the Abtan v. Blackwater case. She represented former detainees of Abu Ghraib prison in a suit against interrogators and translators from CACI and Titan Corp. who were tasked with obtaining military intelligence from them during their detention. Her work was featured in the documentaries The Invisible War and Ghosts of Abu Ghraib. In 2015, the National Law Journal named Burke one of the top 75 female attorneys in the nation.

== Early life and education ==
Burke, the daughter of an Army colonel and nurse practitioner, grew up on various Army bases. Burke's family ended up in northern Virginia, where her mother taught nursing at Catholic University. She received a Bachelor of Science in Foreign Service degree from Georgetown University, and received her J.D. in 1987 from the Columbus School of Law at the Catholic University of America.

== Career ==
Burke has had her own firm since 2005, which has been known in turn, as Burke Pyle LLC, Burke O'Neil LLC, and Burke PLLC. In 2000, Burke became an Equity Partner at the law firm of Montgomery, McCracken, Walker and Rhoads LLP. She has had past associations with Motley Rice, Katz Marshall and Banks, and Montgomery McCracken Walker and Rhoads. Burke was admitted to the bar of the U.S. Court of Appeals for the Fourth Circuit in 1987 and to the bar of the U.S. District Court for the Eastern District of Virginia in 1989. She was admitted to the bar of the U.S. Supreme Court in 2010.

=== Military ===
==== Sexual assault ====
Burke has advocated on behalf of victims of military sexually assault and rape, seeking to change the military system for prosecuting such crimes. In 2011, Burke brought suit on behalf of 17 active-duty service members and veterans who said they were assaulted while in the military and that the Defense Department’s handling of their claims failed to bring the perpetrators to justice. Burke filed suit against former Secretaries of Defense Donald Rumsfeld and Robert Gates on the grounds that they were partially responsible for creating a military environment that made such assaults possible.

The lawsuit was dismissed when the court found that “members of the armed forces cannot sue the military for injuries incurred while serving, including sexual assaults.”

Burke has said in media interviews that she got involved in the issue of military sexual assault based on a call from a woman who had been raped on an Army base but whose case went nowhere after the military claimed to have lost the physical evidence. The woman lost her case.

“It is a completely dysfunctional system,” Burke told the Prince George’s County, Md., TV program Chat with a Lawyer. “They were not convicting people. They weren’t court-martialing people. A tiny fraction, about 100 people, from about 12,000 rapists, were being prosecuted. And most of those weren’t even being convicted.”

==== Burn pits ====
Burke brought a series of class-action lawsuits against KBR and Halliburton on behalf of service members who said exposure to the companies’ open-air “burn pits” in Iraq and Afghanistan made them ill. She was appointed Lead MLD Counsel in the multi-district litigation. The companies prevailed in their argument that the military directed how to handle the garbage on bases, so they were not responsible for any downstream health effects.

In 2022, President Biden signed a bill to expand health care services for the estimated 3.5 million victims.

=== Human rights ===
==== Abu Ghraib ====
Burke represented detainees held at the Abu Ghraib prison—the scandal of the U.S. government-run torture site was significant in turning public opinion against the U.S. occupation of Iraq. Burke's clients had been detained at the prison as enemy combatants, and the U.S. government sought intelligence from the detainees in the war on terror. In 2004, photos surfaced showing detainees stripped naked, intimidated with dogs and covered in excrement. In some of the photos, U.S. military personnel were smiling, appearing to revel in the debasement of the detainees. Investigations found that detainees had been killed and physically and sexually assaulted at the prison.

The lawsuit brought by Burke on behalf of the detainees was against government contractors Titan Corporation and CACI Premier Technologies.

In 2013, defendant company Engility Holdings, which absorbed contractor Titan Corporation, disclosed a $5 million settlement in the case.

==== Nisour Square ====
Burke filed a series of suits against government contractor Blackwater Worldwide for their role in an October 2007 shooting in Baghdad that left 17 Iraqis dead. One employee was found guilty of murder. Three others were convicted of manslaughter and firearms crimes. A fifth employee had previously pleaded guilty to manslaughter. The New York Times summarized the damage to the public image of the company:

While the company’s security guards were involved in scores of shootings in Iraq, it was the 2007 incident in Nisour Square that helped cement Blackwater’s image as a company that operated with impunity because of its lucrative contracts with the American government. The company became the subject of several Justice Department investigations, all of which the company and its executives survived. But ultimately, public outrage over the shooting contributed to Blackwater’s demise. It lost its contracts and was renamed, sold and renamed again.

The civil case was settled, according to the International Crimes Database project.

==== Prisoner abuses ====
Burke filed suit on behalf of two prisoners who alleged they were beaten by guards at a Sussex County, Delaware, prison. According to the inmates' suit, a guard at the facility attacked them and then was joined by other guards, even though they had done nothing to provoke the violence. One prisoner stated that he had laid down on his cell floor with his hands visible and behind his back, but was still assaulted by the guards.

=== Disability rights, other work ===
Burke has prosecuted cases on behalf of people with mental illness, (Dixon et al. v Williams), people with disabilities (Baltimore suit over the paratransit system), and inmates who asserted they were overcharged by providers of phone services in the jails. Burke has brought cases against health care providers for alleged Medicare and Medicaid fraud and worked on campaign finance issues on behalf of former Philadelphia Mayor Michael Nutter.

== Notable cases ==
=== Abtan v. Blackwater ===
Burke represented plaintiffs Talib Mutlaq Deewan and the estates of Himoud Saed Abtan, Usama Fadil Abbass and Oday Ismail Ibraheem in a lawsuit against Blackwater (now Academi). The lawsuit, which stemmed from the firefight in Nisoor Square in Baghdad, alleged Blackwater had violated the federal Alien Tort Statute by committing extrajudicial killing and war crimes, and that the company was liable for assault and battery, wrongful death, intentional and negligent infliction of emotional distress, and negligent hiring, training and supervision. The lawsuit was settled on January 6, 2010.

=== Saleh v. Titan Corp. ===
In 2008, a federal judge in Virginia allowed former detainees to sue CACI International Inc. and Titan Corp. for mistreatment while being held in Abu Ghraib. Burke represented a group of men suing these organizations. The case was dismissed on September 11, 2009, by a panel of the Court of Appeals for the District of Columbia, on the grounds that the charges could not be brought against the contractors under the Alien Tort Statute. On June 27, 2011, the Supreme Court refused to review the case.

=== Davis v. U.S. Training Center, Inc. ===
A suit, officially known as United States of America, ex rel. Melan Davis and Brad Davis v. U.S. Training Center, Inc., f/k/a Blackwater Lodge and Training Center, Inc., was filed in the U.S. Fourth Circuit Court of Appeals on October 28, 2011, under the False Claims Act (FCA). The plaintiffs, Melan and Brad Davis, alleged that their former employer, U.S. Training Center, had overbilled and defrauded the U.S. government while providing security services in New Orleans after Hurricane Katrina, as well as in Iraq and Afghanistan. On August 5, 2011, a jury ruled in favor of U.S. Training Center. Much of the evidence presented had been ruled by Federal Judge T.S. Ellis III to be either inadmissible or unsubstantiated, including the oft-reported claim that the contractors had billed the government for prostitutes.

=== Burke v. Doe ===
These are two precedent setting cases commonly referred to as Burke-I and Burke-II.

In 2013 Burke filed a defamation lawsuit against two Wikipedia editors who had falsely stated she had been sanctioned by a federal judge. The matter also stemmed from inaccuracies concerning the Atban case and a similar criminal case against Blackwater in the text of her Wikipedia entry. Burke claimed that the confusion between cases may have been the result of a conflict-of-interest for the editors in question, alleging that the editors were possibly working for Blackwater at the time of the edits. One of the defending editors' attorneys, Christopher Hajec of the Center for Individual Rights, argued that the lawsuit could have the effect of chilling freedom of speech and the willingness of Wikipedia editors to "edit on matters of public concern". On May 29, 2014, a Washington DC court quashed one of her two subpoenas of John Doe Wikipedia editors, as a result of the application of DC's recent anti-SLAPP laws. The other Wikipedia editor's subpoena was not quashed in the decision.

=== Cioca et al. v. Rumsfeld et al. ===
Plaintiffs in this case said they were raped or sexually assaulted while in the military and that the Department of Defense failed to properly investigate and prosecute their cases. Burke represented the active-duty service members and veterans in their suit, which named former Secretary of Defense Donald Rumsfeld as a defendant. The complaint was dismissed when the court agreed with the government’s argument that service members could not sue the military for injuries that are “incident to plaintiffs’ military service.”

== Awards ==
- Mary Philbrook Public Interest Award, 2018
- Listing of top 75 female attorneys in the U.S. by the National Law Journal, 2015
- "Woman Doing Good." Self magazine, 2013

== Criticism, defamation suit ==
Reports published in The New York Times and for CBS News were critical of Burke's defense of Abu Ghraib detainees, citing Pentagon reports stating that 14-20% of individuals who have been released from such facilities because they have been deemed not to pose a serious threat allegedly resume terrorist activities. One such former detainee, Ibrahim Shafir Sen, who was released from Guantanamo and, with Burke as his attorney, filed a suit against Secretary of Defense Donald Rumsfeld, was later re-arrested in Turkey and charged with being a leader of an al-Qaida terrorist cell.

During a hearing on the civil immunity of government contractors working at Abu Ghraib, Burke asserted that enemy combatants should have the right to sue U.S. soldiers if the U.S. attorney general "fails to intervene." The court disagreed.

=== Defamation lawsuit ===
In September 2013 Burke filed a defamation lawsuit to discover the identities of two anonymous Wikipedia editors who she alleged had inserted misleading information into her Wikipedia article (i.e. this article). One of her goals of the suit was to discover if there was a connection between those two editors and Blackwater. One of the John Does filed an anti-SLAPP lawsuit against Burke, backed by the Center for Individual Rights, asserting that her lawsuit was intended to chill or silence speech. The trial court denied Doe's motion. But on May 29, 2014, the DC Court of Appeals reversed that decision. The appeals court specifically held that "Ms. Burke is public figure," "she is required to show malice on [John Doe's] part in order to succeed on her defamation claim," and that "she is unlikely to be able to do so [show actual malice] here." The appeals court said that Doe could now pursue recovery of legal fees in the trial court.
