= Blackwater 61 crash =

2004 aviation accident in Afghanistan

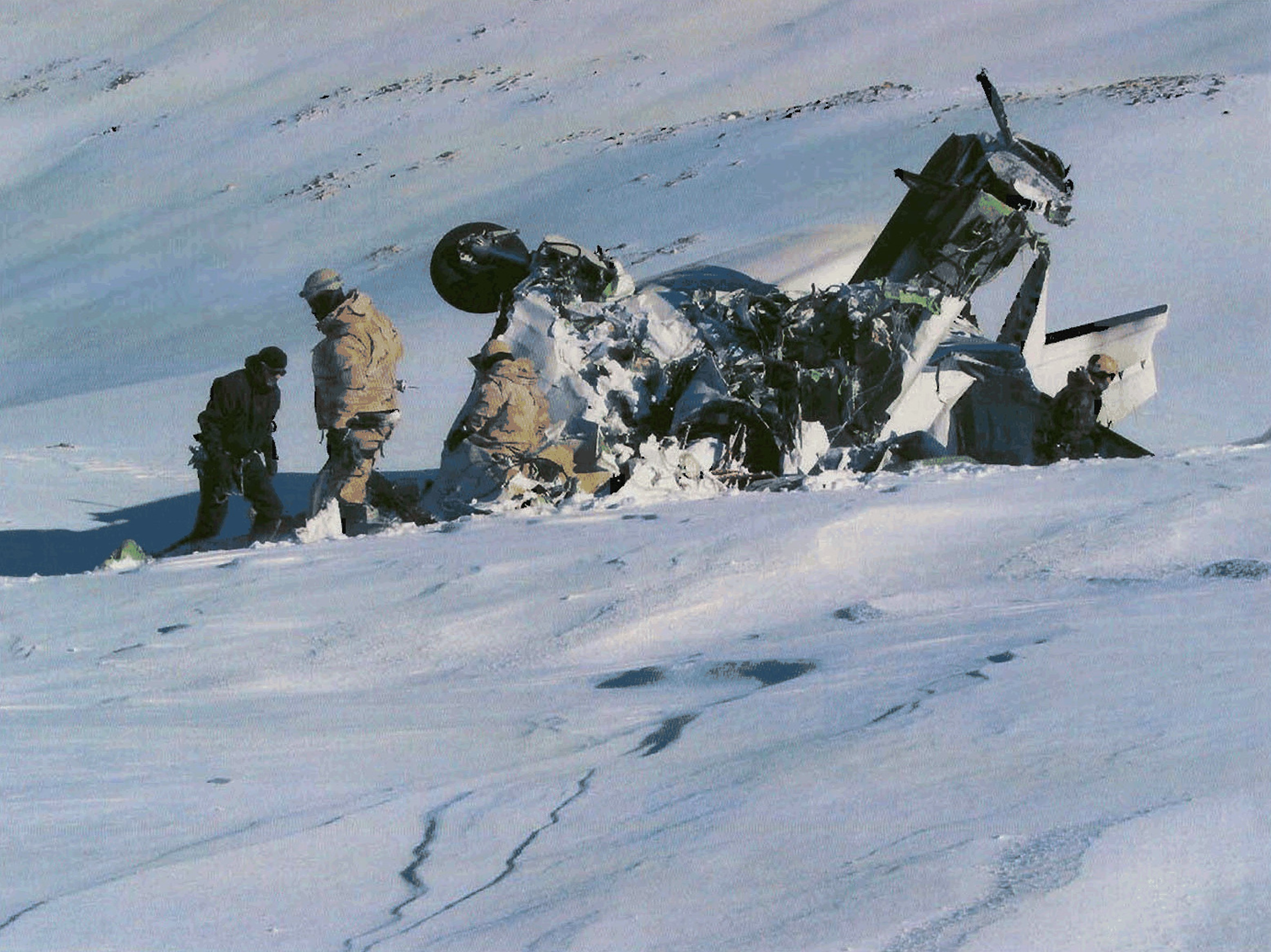
- Wreckage of the aircraft at the crash site

Accident
- Date: 27 November 2004
- Summary: Stalled maneuvering out of a box canyon
- Site: Bamiyan Valley, Afghanistan; 34°38′48″N 67°38′00″E

Aircraft
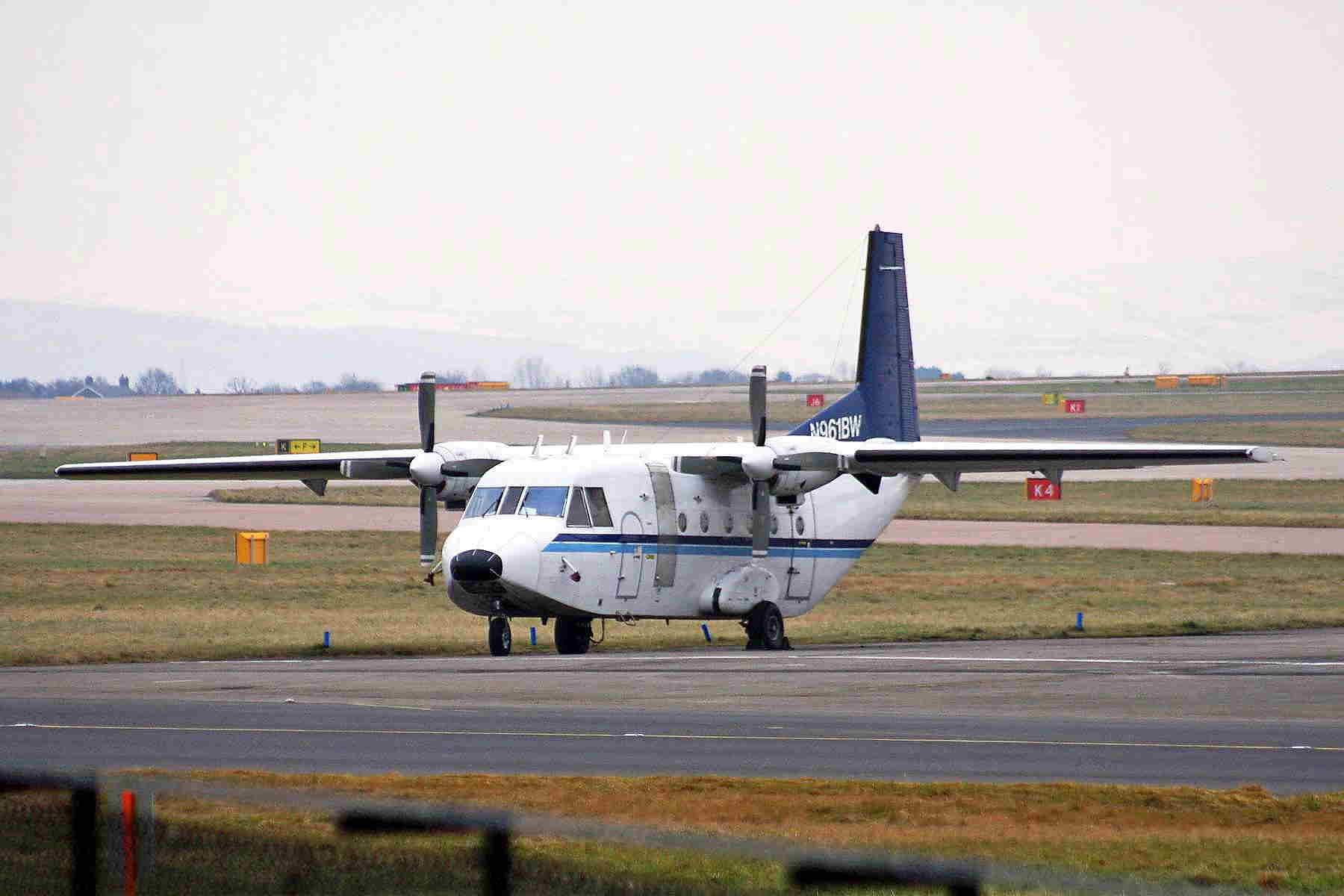
- A Blackwater CASA 212 similar to the one involved in the accident
- Aircraft type: CASA 212
- Operator: Presidential Airways Inc., aviation affiliate of Blackwater.
- Registration: N960BW
- Flight origin: Bagram Air Base, Afghanistan
- Destination: Farah Airport, Afghanistan
- Passengers: 3
- Crew: 3
- Fatalities: 6
- Survivors: 0

Blackwater 61 was the callsign of a CASA 212 aircraft, registration N960BW, operated by Presidential Airways Inc, the aviation subsidiary of the private security contractor Blackwater USA, that crashed in the mountains of remote central Afghanistan on November 27, 2004. The turboprop airplane was carrying three military passengers and three members of the flight crew when it crashed into the highest of a range of mountains stretching west of Kabul. According to the National Transportation Safety Board investigative report of the accident, the Blackwater pilots were "behaving unprofessionally" and were "deliberately flying the nonstandard route low through the valley for fun." The accident contributed to the debate over the use of private military contractors in war-zones and Blackwater's hiring practices and standard operating procedures. Blackwater aircraft had been operating in Afghanistan under contract with the U.S. military to transport troops and supplies throughout the country. All six people aboard the aircraft died in the crash, including one who initially survived but later died awaiting rescue.

== Background ==
Blackwater USA was founded in 1997 by former Navy SEALs, Erik Prince and Al Clark, in North Carolina as a security training firm that provided instruction to military and law enforcement personnel. Prior to the 9/11 attacks the company had $200,000 in federal contracts. However, by 2002 it was paid millions of dollars from the federal government for contracts to protect U.S. facilities and personnel overseas. Blackwater saw an even more dramatic growth after the 2003 invasion of Iraq and by 2006 had over $600 million in federal contracts.

In 2004, the company was contracted by Air Mobility Command to assist the military in its operations in Afghanistan, Pakistan, and Uzbekistan. The contract was a 2-year, $34.8 million deal which would require Blackwater aircraft to haul U.S. troops and equipment on short flights across the region, often between unimproved remote airstrips. At the time aircraft operated by the company included the CASA 212 and the Bombardier Dash-8. Blackwater's aviation assets fall under the Melbourne, Florida based Presidential Airways Inc. which was owned by Blackwater. Under the contract Presidential Airways would fly six regularly scheduled routes to small airfields in Afghanistan. In testimony to Congress, Erik Prince explained Blackwater's role in Afghanistan saying, "We were hired to fill that void because there is a different—it's a different kind of airlift mission going in and out of the very short strips in Afghanistan. You have high altitude, short strips, unimproved runways, and you have transport aircraft that are designed to support a large, conventional battle."

This was not the only aviation contract that Blackwater was under. It operated a fleet of MD-530 helicopters to provide security for the State Department in Iraq. The helicopters were based out of the Green Zone in Baghdad, Iraq. One of the company's helicopters crashed in 2007 due to enemy fire.

== Accident ==
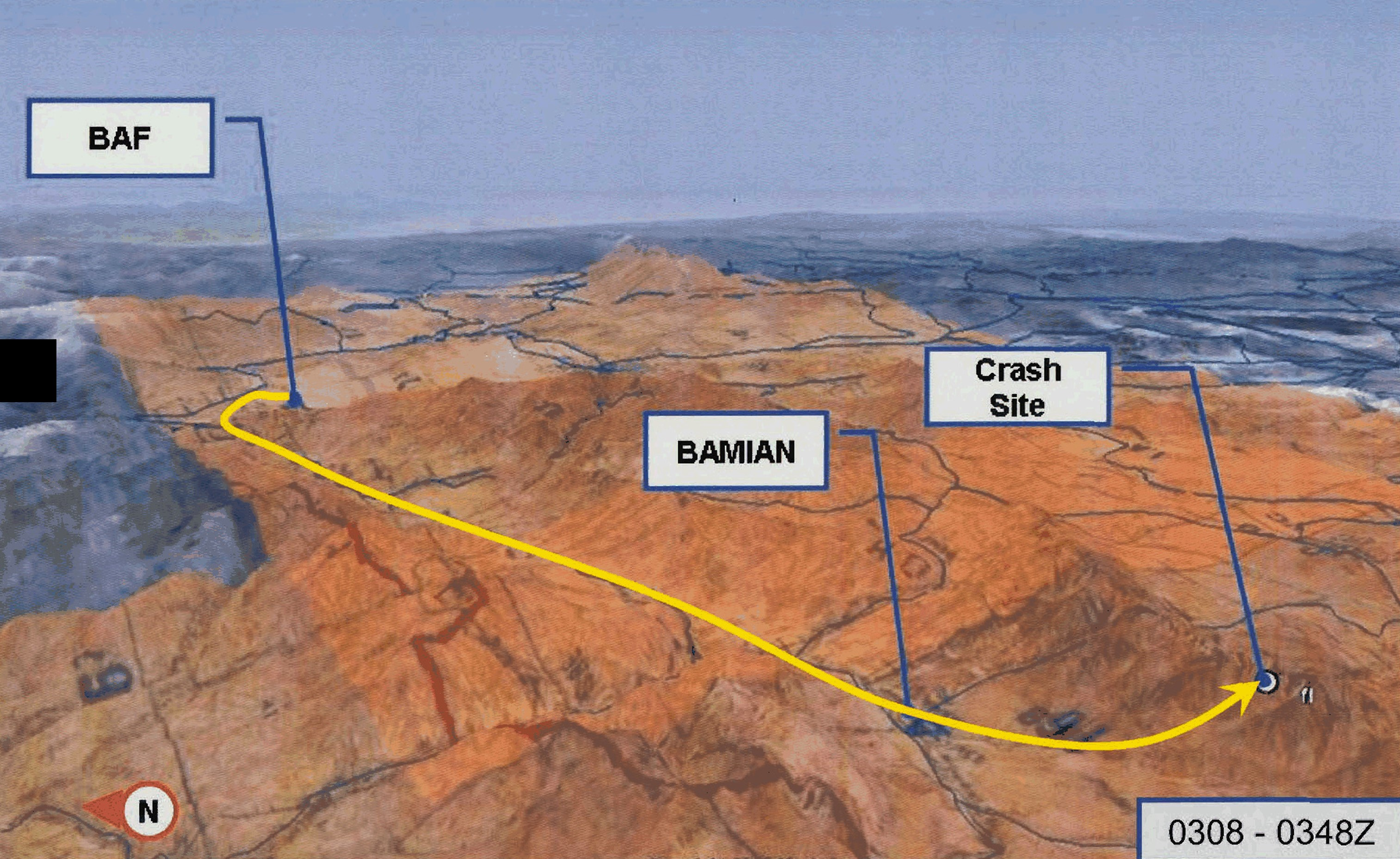
Overview of Blackwater 61's flight path

On 27 November 2004, Blackwater 61 a Presidential Airways Inc. CASA 212, registration N960BW, took off from Bagram Air Base. The aircraft was crewed by pilot Noel English, 37, first officer Loren Hammer, 35, with flight mechanic Melvin Rowe, 43, also on board. It was carrying three passengers: Lieutenant Colonel Michael McMahon, 41, Chief Warrant Officer Travis Grogan, 31, and Specialist Harley Miller, 21, all members of the United States Army. It was also carrying 400 pounds of mortar illumination rounds. The aircraft was due to fly for two and a half hours to the southwestern city of Farah where the soldiers were based. Instead of flying the customary route that would take the aircraft due south from Bagram and then west as they reached the south of the country, the pilots, who had only been in Afghanistan for thirteen days, flew west from Bagram over extremely rugged terrain. Weather conditions in the area were good with high visibility.

A transcript of the cockpit voice recorder showed the crew were unsure about their navigation with the pilot remarking early into the flight, "I hope I'm goin' in the right valley." Near the beginning of the released transcript Rowe, the mechanic, also remarks "I don't know what we're gonna see, we don't normally go this route." The transcript also featured the pilots bantering about the flight and their job saying, "Yeah this is fun!", and "Yeah you're an x-wing fighter Star Wars man!" the co-pilot exclaimed. The pilot said "I swear to God they wouldn't pay me if they knew how much fun this was." At one point the pilots also talked about what music they should play in the aircraft. As they neared a box canyon, Rowe asks the pilots, "Okay, you guys are gonna make this right?", to which English replied "Yeah I'm hopin." Approaching the end of the canyon, the pilots struggled to avoid a crash, desperately trying to turn around. The aircraft's flaps were deployed but it was too late. The stall warning sounds and Rowe can be heard shouting "We're goin' down!" before the transcript ends. The CASA 212 crashed in the Koh-i-Baba mountain range.

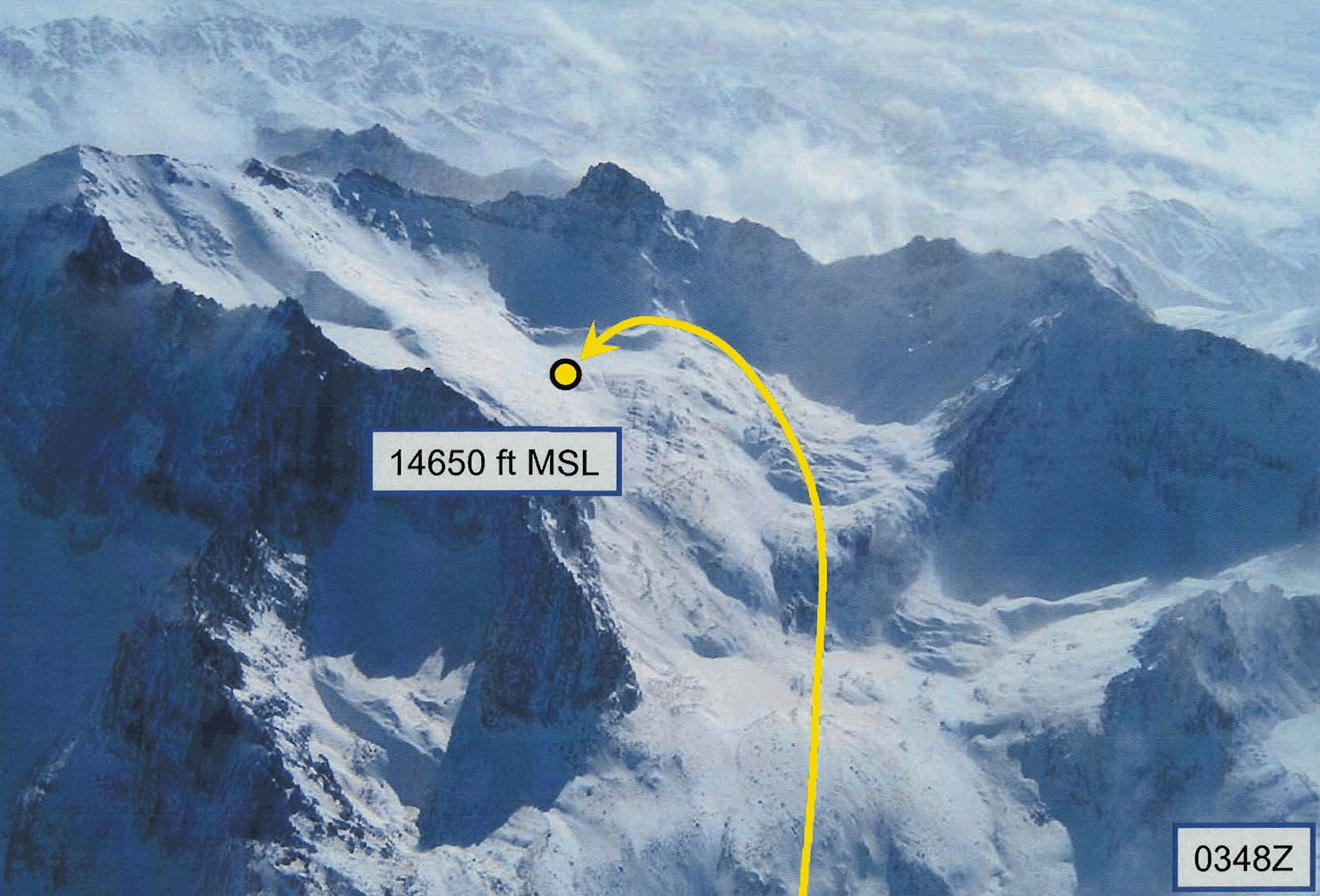
Trajectory of Blackwater 61's flight path leading up to the crash

All of the people aboard Blackwater 61 were killed, including both pilots who had been ejected from the aircraft. Specialist Miller initially survived the crash with a broken rib, abdominal and lung trauma, and minor head injuries. He survived for 8–10 hours before succumbing to his injuries, compounded by the freezing temperatures and shortage of oxygen.

Recovery efforts were hampered for several reasons. Blackwater did not have the infrastructure in Afghanistan capable of tracking or keeping account of its aircraft meaning the aircraft's disappearance was not noticed until a sergeant in Farah made his superiors aware the aircraft was overdue. In addition, Blackwater 61 did not have any tracking equipment aboard and no flight plan had been filed so finding the wreckage was difficult. Search and rescue teams covered the logical route extending south from Bagram to no avail. It was not until a U.S. military aircraft flying near the wreckage site picked up the signal emitted by the aircraft's emergency locator transmitter (ELT) that teams located the crash site.

== Investigation ==
The crash of Blackwater 61 was investigated by the National Transportation Safety Board and the U.S. Army Collateral Investigations Board. The primary evidence used in the crash investigation were the aircraft's black box recordings. The investigation showed that the cause of the crash was the inexperienced flight crew flying an unfamiliar route and the lack of adequate terrain clearance. While making a sharp one hundred eighty degree turn the CASA 212 stalled and collided with the mountain range. In addition, the NTSB noted that it is possible the pilots had been experiencing symptoms of hypoxia hampering decision making, owing to the high altitude of the flight and lack of oxygen equipment on board.

The investigative report faulted Blackwater for hiring inexperienced pilots and violating its own policy of ensuring at least one pilot had at least 30 days flying in country. Paul Hooper, Blackwater Afghanistan site manager, said in an e-mail, "By necessity, the initial group hired to support the Afghanistan operation did not meet the criteria identified in e-mail traffic and had some background and experience shortfalls overlooked in favor of getting the requisite number of personnel on board to start up the contract." The NTSB also faulted the Department of Defense and Federal Aviation Administration for not providing sufficient oversight of its contractors. One of the most damning parts of the report stated that Spc. Miller, who had survived the initial crash, would have survived had he received appropriate medical assistance within eight hours.

Both pilots were experienced in flying in the United States. Noel English, the pilot in command, had been a bush pilot in Alaska while Loren Hammer, the first officer, had been a fire pilot, flying smokejumpers into wildfires. They were highly trained in flying through rugged terrain at low altitudes. Nevertheless, flying in the United States is much different than flying in Afghanistan where weather forecasting and air traffic control are largely nonexistent, and peaks are much higher.

== Lawsuit ==
As more evidence presented itself about the circumstances of the crash, it became clear that the fault for the crash lay on the negligence of the pilots and Blackwater; the families of the Army soldiers killed in the crash filed a lawsuit against the company. In a statement, the lawyer for the plaintiffs said that Blackwater had been "cutting corners" in regards to its contract services and as a result had put American troops at risk. Initially, the company tried to claim immunity from litigation because it was employed by the Department of Defense and therefore could not be sued. It also claimed protection under the Federal Tort Claims Act. This defense was rejected by District Court Judge John Antoon. Blackwater then claimed protection under the Feres doctrine, which gave immunity to the government from lawsuits filed by servicemen injured while in military service. Antoon rejected this defense as well, ruling that the Feres doctrine was solely applicable to the government, not contractors. Every motion made by Blackwater to have the case dismissed was denied.

== Aftermath ==
As a result of the crash the U.S. military suspended Blackwater operations in Afghanistan for one month but nonetheless renewed their contract for $92 million. Blackwater aircraft were refitted with flight trackers and a new policy required all flights to have at least one experienced crew member in the cockpit.
