= EP Aviation =

Airline of the United States

EP Aviation based in McLean, Virginia, is an aviation company owned by Academi (formerly Blackwater Security). Assets may include an Embraer Super Tucano and 28 other aircraft including eight SA330J Puma and 14 Bell 412 helicopters. Blackwater has another affiliate known as Presidential Airways which also has a number of registered aircraft. The Pumas were former Bundespolizei and were purchased from HELOG. EP Aviation is active in Afghanistan and Iraq.

EP Aviation is named for Blackwater's owner, Erik Prince.

== Fleet ==
The EP Aviation fleet includes the following aircraft (as of August 2016):

EP Aviation Fleet
| Aircraft | In Fleet | Orders | Passengers | Notes |
|---|---|---|---|---|
| Bombardier Dash 8-100 | 4 | — |
| Total | 4 |

The airline fleet also included the following aircraft (as of October 2011):

- 14 Bell 412 helicopters
- 3 Hughes/MD 369 "Little Bird" helicopters
- 4 Bell 214ST medium-lift helicopters
- 3 Fairchild Swearingen Merlin IIIC turboprop airliners
- 9 Aérospatiale Puma utility helicopters
- 1 Maule Air MT-7-235 STOL aircraft
- 1 Embraer EMB 314 Super Tucano counterinsurgency aircraft
- 1 Mooney M20E fixed wing aircraft.

== Incidents and accidents ==
SA.330J (c/n 1358) N605R, ditched in an unknown location within Afghanistan around mid December 2008.

== See also ==
- Aviation Worldwide Services an affiliated company
