= Presidential Airways =

Presidential Airways may refer to:

- Presidential Airways (charter) an American charter airline based in Florida
- Presidential Airways (scheduled) a failed American passenger airline from the 1980s
