= Susan Burke =

Susan Burke may refer to:

- Susan L. Burke (born 1962), American lawyer
- Susan Theresa Burke, American writer, actress and stand up comic

== See also ==
- Sue Burke (born 1955), American writer and translator
