= Box canyon (aviation) =

Narrow canyon hazardous to aircraft

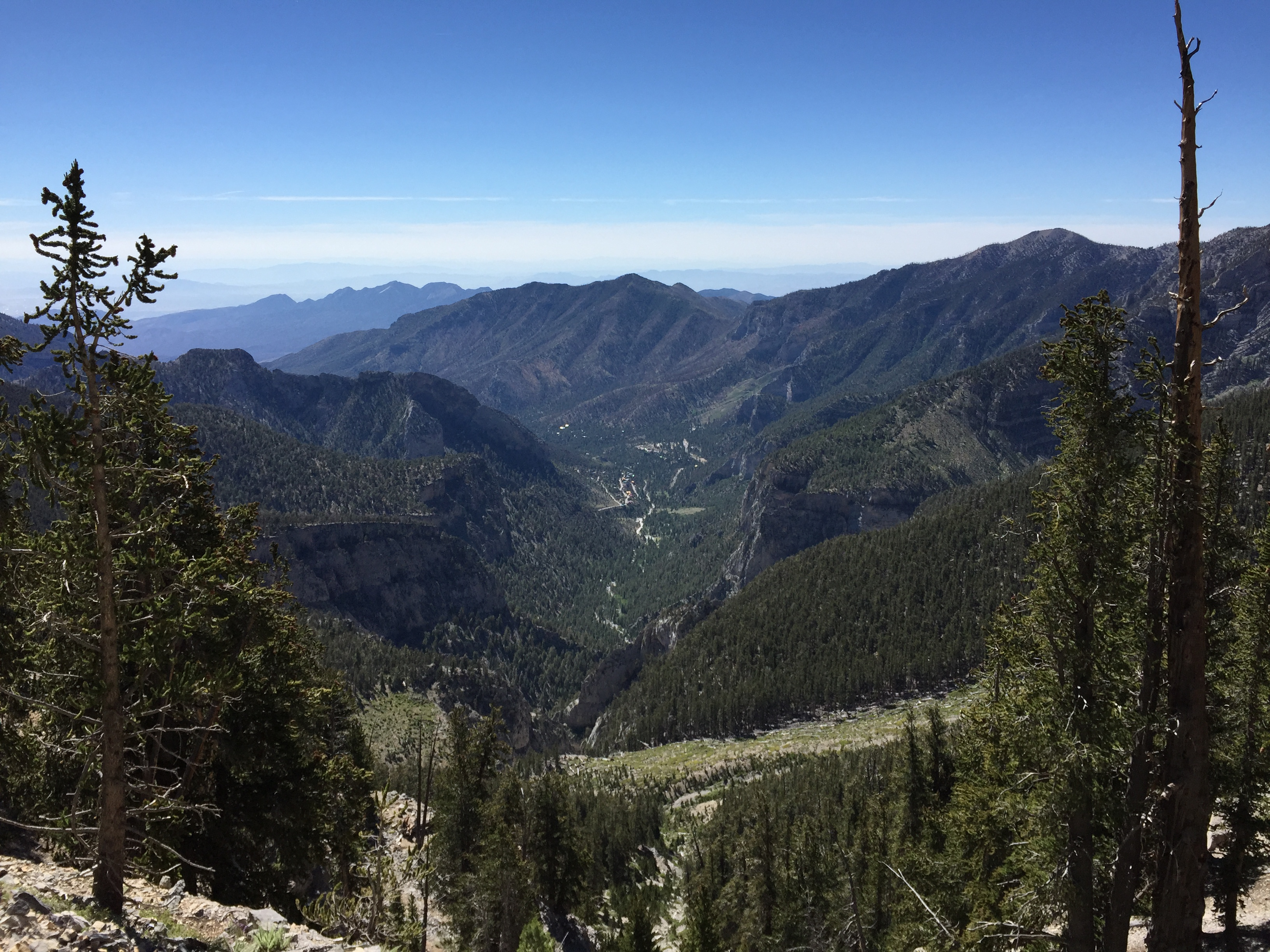
Kyle Canyon, a box canyon containing Mount Charleston, Nevada and the site of a fatal 2008 plane crash

In aviation, a box canyon, also referred to as a blind canyon, is a narrowing canyon with steep walls on either side of a floor that gradually increases in elevation. Box canyons often have narrow turning distances for aircraft and end in abrupt changes in elevations. Box canyons can also refer to limitations created by airspace restrictions or obstacles created by tall buildings in metropolitan areas. Flights into box canyons by pilots are often not intentional and due to pilot error. Box canyons can represent a risk of collision with terrain or stall.

== Definition ==
A box canyon is generally characterized as a valley with a rising canyon floor and a narrowing canyon width. In mountainous regions, box canyons tend to end with abrupt changes in elevation or dead ends exceeding 10,000 ft (3,000 m) in elevation. The walls of box canyons can gradually narrow as the canyon approaches its end.

In areas with airspace restrictions, such as New York City, a box canyon-equivalent can be formed by airspace restrictions. Airspace over the East River is available to flights under visual flight rules (VFR), but airspace to the north of Roosevelt Island is under class B airspace relating to LaGuardia International Airport. The corridor of VFR airspace functions as a box canyon for pilots that do not have the proper air traffic control clearances to enter the class B airspace.

== Hazards ==
Lighting conditions below the canyon rim in box canyons can obscure surrounding terrain and cause pilots to believe that they are further away from terrain compared to their true separation. When flying inside box canyons, pilots can focus too much attention on high ridges ahead, causing them to neglect the slowing rising terrain of the canyon floor. This can cause a pilot to attempt a turn back at a point where both vertical and horizontal distance have decreased due to the narrowing canyon geography. During turns, the stall speed increases due to increased load factor. A turn back attempt may result in a stall if the aircraft's airspeed is not properly kept track of by the pilot.

Box canyons can be present in mountainous regions at high altitude. Risks with flying at high altitudes such as hazardous winds, mountain waves, and poor visibility apply to flights within box canyons. Weather conditions in mountainous areas can result in pilots flying in conditions exceeding what they are capable of handling. Due to their presence in high elevations above mean sea level, density altitude can negatively affect aircraft performance when flying in box canyons. High density altitudes necessitates higher speeds to create the same lift experienced at lower altitudes, results in slower rates of climb, and reduced efficiency and thrust on propeller aircraft. Aircraft at high density altitudes have higher ground speeds, making turning out of a box canyon require a larger turning radius compared to an equivalent turn at sea level. Inexperience with mountain flying can lead to surprise in pilots regarding different aircraft performance.

=== Prevention ===
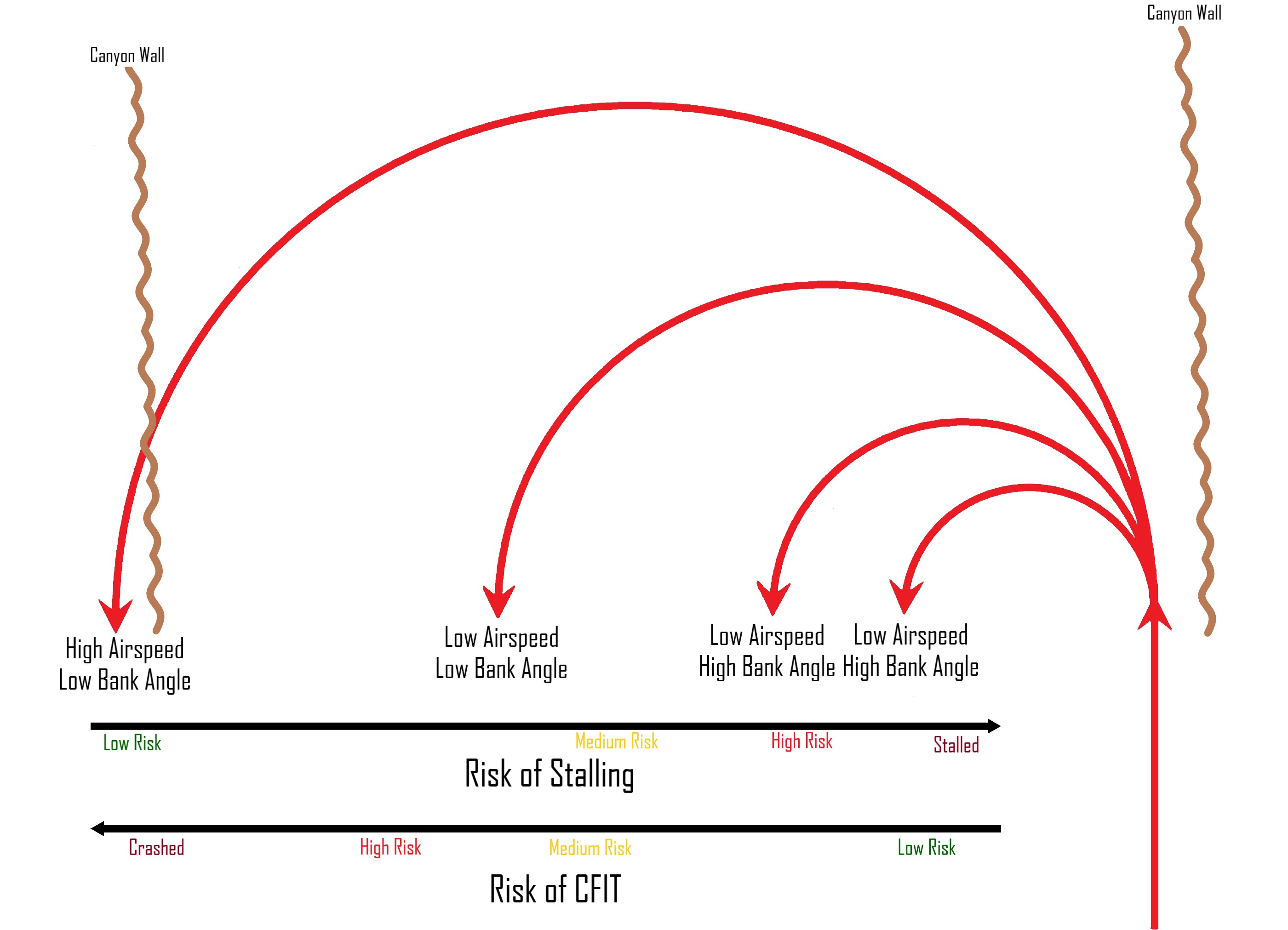
Diagram of the canyon escape turn, with different turn radii influenced by airspeed and bank angle. The risk of stalling increases when turning too tight, and the risk of suffering a controlled flight into terrain increases when turning too widely.

When flying in mountainous conditions, maintaining proper situational awareness can help avoid pilots accidentally flying into box canyons and risking a controlled flight into terrain. Flight training manuals from Transport Canada note that the need to turn out of a canyon is "likely due to poor decision-making." If a pilot needs to escape a box canyon, a canyon escape turn may be executed. A canyon escape turn involves a potentially descending 180° turn at low velocity with high g-forces. Despite the belief of many pilots, a chandelle is not the proper technique for reversing course out of a box canyon. The Federal Aviation Administration's Airplane Flying Handbook and Pilot's Handbook of Aeronautical Knowledge do not list a chandelle as the proper escape method and mountain flying experts do not recommend usage of such a maneuver. A chandelle does not give proper turning radius or altitude to be a maximum performance maneuver to reverse course.

To execute a canyon escape turn, pilots maneuver the aircraft to minimize the turn radius by flying at a slower airspeed while increasing the bank angle and g-forces. Different values for airspeed and bank angle have been recommended. The Aircraft Owners and Pilots Association suggests that pilots should slow down to the flap extension speed, deploy the flaps, and turn with a bank angle of 45°. Transport Canada recommends to pilots in their flight training manual that the airspeed should be reduced to no less than maximum endurance speed (Note: The stall speed for an aircraft in landing configuration.) and the turn should be conducted with a bank angle of 30°. Other sources recommend bank angles up to 60°, an airspeed 1.83 times the stall speed, or an airspeed for the best rate-of-climb. Civil Air Patrol recommends to pilots in their mountain flying training to keep airspeed at the designed maneuvering speed, increase the bank angle to 60°, extend the flaps to between 10–20°, and add power when necessary to keep the airspeed above the stall speed.

The equation for the turn radius in feet, R, in respect to airspeed in knots, V, and the bank angle is as follows:

$$R = \frac{V^2}{11.26 \cdot tan(\text{bank angle})}$$

While flying in canyons or valleys, pilots are instructed to not fly down the center of a box canyon and instead fly on either side. This is to ensure that pilots have space to conduct a 180° turn or a canyon escape turn. Civil Air Patrol recommends that pilots should fly on the upwind side of the canyon so turns will be into the wind. Federal Aviation Administration documents instruct pilots to not fly up box canyons without first flying down them to ensure there is proper space to turn around if necessary. They also instruct pilots to never attempt to out climb terrain due to reduced aircraft performance and to plan to fly 1,000 ft (300 m) above mountain passes. Recommended techniques for flying in mountains have pilots climb to an altitude suitable for crossing planned ridges before starting the turn to the ridge.

== Notable accidents ==
Event	Date	Aircraft	Site	Fatalities/Occupants	Summary	Image
Wichita State University football team plane crash	2 October 1970	Martin 4-0-4	Mount Trelease, near Silver Plume, Colorado, United States	32/40	The aircraft was carrying members of the Wichita State University football team scheduled to play against Utah State University. The pilots decided to fly up Clear Creek Canyon following US Highway 6 for what the first officer described to the passengers as a "scenic route". Flying below the surrounding ridge line, the crew's view of the end of the canyon was obscured by Mount Sniktau and the crew did not climb. The crew only discovered that they were traveling down a box canyon after passing Dry Gulch, by which time climbing over the terrain was impossible. The crew attempted to reverse course, but the available space to do so had reduced to the point where making a turn back was impossible. The aircraft crashed into Mount Trelease at an elevation of 10,750 ft (3,280 m), killing 32 out of the 40 people on board.	
Matilija Wilderness Beechcraft Bonanza crashes	30 June 2002	Two Beechcraft V35A Bonanza	Matilija Wilderness, California, United States	6/6 (Three fatalities on both aircraft)	A formation flight of eight aircraft distributed across three groups were flying out of Van Nuys Airport. In the first group, a lead Beechcraft Bonanza was being followed by two other Beechcraft Bonanzas. The first two aircraft in the group descended to between 500–1,000 ft (150–300 m) above ground level while the third followed behind and above. The two aircraft entered a box canyon and impacted terrain 4,925 ft (1,501 m) above sea level while maneuvering through it.	
Embry-Riddle Aeronautical University Cessna 172 crash	29 November 2003	Cessna 172S	Near Wikieup, Arizona, United States	0/1	The pilot was flying an aircraft operated by the Embry-Riddle Aeronautical University. He initially planned a cruising altitude of 9,500 ft (2,900 m) but descended to 7,000 ft (2,100 m) to view surface features. The aircraft subsequently entered mountainous terrain and flew into a box canyon. During his attempts to maneuver out of the canyon, the aircraft impacted terrain at an elevation of 7,200 ft (2,200 m), injuring the pilot.	
United States Forest Service Cessna 206 crash	20 September 2004	Cessna U206G	Near Essex, Montana, United States	3/5	The public use flight was intended to transport four employees of the United States Forest Service to a Schafer Airport. Planned flight route followed U.S. Route 2. Terrain surrounding the flight path was obscured by a low cloud base. The pilot reported that he was over Essex and was about to leave the highway, but radar data showed he was actually short of the town. The aircraft then flew up a drainage basin associated with Tunnel Creek originating from the Flathead Range. The drainage ended in a box canyon. The pilot soon realized his mistake but ended up impacting terrain at 6,604 ft (2,013 m) while attempting to reverse course. Two out of the three people on board were killed, while one person dying of their injuries before the wreckage was found. Review of pilot logs showed that he only had 14 flight hours of experience flying at backcountry airports in the past two years.	
Blackwater 61 crash	27 November 2004	CASA C-212	Bamiyan Valley, Bamiyan, Afghanistan	6/6	The aircraft was contracted by the Department of Defense to assist operations in Afghanistan. The CASA C-212 was flying from Bagram Air Base to Farah Airport to transport military cargo. After takeoff, the aircraft began flying down a valley that was not on a direct route to the destination. The cockpit voice recorder indicated that the captain and first officer knew that they were flying on a nonstandard route and captured conversations between the crew were saying that they were having "fun". Both pilots knew that they were approaching the end of a box canyon for more than fifteen minutes prior to the crash, but they did not initiate a climb or a canyon escape turn. Only in the final seconds of flight did the captain attempt to resolve the situation. During the captain's turn back attempt, the aircraft impacted snow-covered terrain at an elevation of 14,650 ft (4,470 m). All six people on board were killed, although one person initially survived the impact.	
New York City Cirrus SR20 crash	11 October 2006	Cirrus SR20	Belaire Apartments, New York, United States	2/2	New York Yankees pitcher Cory Lidle and a certified flight instructor were flying out of Teterboro Airport and air traffic control cleared them for a visual flight rules (VFR) departure while telling the pilots to out of class B airspace. The aircraft then flew up the East River, a "virtual" box canyon subject to VFR rules which ended north of Roosevelt Island with LaGuardia International Airport's class B airspace. Near the end of the VFR airspace, the pilots began a left turn to reverse course. The aircraft did not complete the turn before passing over the Manhattan shoreline. The pilots increased the bank angle to try and complete the turn, but the aircraft pitched down and crashed into the Belaire Apartments 333 ft (101 m) above sea level. Both pilots died and three people on the ground were injured. Radar data indicated that turn was started closer to the middle of the river rather than the eastern shoreline, reducing turning distance. An easterly wind present at the time of the accident also reduced the effective turn radius.	
Mount Charleston Piper PA-32 crash	28 June 2008	Piper PA-32-300 Cherokee	Mount Charleston, Nevada, United States	4/4	The aircraft was flying out of North Las Vegas Airport. The pilot requested to air traffic control to fly on heading 230° and answered affirmatively to their question about if he was planning on flying southwest of the Spring Mountains. However, the aircraft travelled on a heading of 290° and eventually entered a valley approximately 300 ft (91 m) above ground level. The aircraft then crashed at an elevation of 7,660 ft (2,330 m) at the base of a box canyon, killing all four people on board. The mountain peaks surrounding the accident reached elevations of 10,000–11,918 ft (3,048–3,633 m). The density altitude at the accident site was above 11,000 ft (3,400 m). The aircraft did not have sufficient performance to perform a course reversal at the accident site.	
Pacific Flying Club Cessna 152 crash	5 July 2011	Cessna 152	Near Harrison Lake, British Columbia, Canada	2/2	The aircraft flew into a canyon while on a training flight. The instructor pilot attempted to conduct a canyon escape turn, but due to the direction of the turn from the left side of the canyon to the right, and the position of the sun, the aircraft faced a shadowed surface that made it difficult for the pilots to visually determine their bank angle. The aircraft stalled and crashed into terrain 2,750 ft (840 m) above sea level, killing both people on board.	
Lake Berryessa ICON A5 crash	8 May 2017	ICON A5	Lake Berryessa, California, United States	2/2	The aircraft was being flown by a pilot familiarizing a passenger recently hired by ICON Aircraft. The pilot flew the aircraft at a low altitude over the lake surface. A turn was then made into Little Portuguese Canyon, a canyon with rising terrain on either side. When the pilot realized that the canyon did not lead to more of the lake, as he likely thought, he attempted to conduct a 180° left turn to escape the canyon. Due to the limited aircraft performance and low altitude in respect to the surrounding terrain, the aircraft could not maintain clearance from terrain. Both people on board were killed in the subsequent crash at 440 ft (130 m) in elevation.	
Cascade Glasair GlaStar crash	2 September 2017	Glasair GlaStar	Near Cascade, Idaho, United States	1/2	The aircraft was bought from an Idaho-based owner and the buyer asked a Georgia-based pilot to fly it back to Georgia. The pilot agreed and after spending a day familiarizing himself, flew the aircraft to a remote airfield to meet his cousin. The following day, the aircraft departed and began flying northeast. While en route, the aircraft entered a box canyon, and the pilot realized the aircraft's climb performance was not sufficient to climb over it. He attempted to conduct a canyon escape turn, but the aircraft stalled and crashed into terrain at an elevation of 7,500 ft (2,300 m). The pilot survived with serious injuries while his cousin was killed. The pilot had little experience flying in mountains, resulting in poor planning, navigation, and an over-estimation in the aircraft's climb performance at high altitudes.	
Ju-Air Junkers Ju 52 crash	4 August 2018	Junkers Ju 52	Piz Segnas, Grisons, Switzerland	20/20	The aircraft was on the second day of a two-day sightseeing flight around the Alps. On the day of the accident, the aircraft was flying from Locarno Airport to Dübendorf Air Base. During the flight, the crew maneuvered the aircraft and entered a basin southwest of Piz Segnas to attempt to give the passengers a view of the Martinsloch natural rock window and tourist attraction. Due to their altitude and position, the crew did not give themselves necessary clearance to turn back. Downdrafts from the surrounding mountain tops caused the left wing to exceed the critical angle of attack and stall. The aircraft subsequently crashed into terrain at an elevation of 8,120 ft (2,470 m), killing all 20 people on board.	
Alkan Air Cessna 208 crash	6 August 2019	Cessna 208B Grand Caravan	Near Mayo, Yukon, Canada	2/2	The pilot was on his fourth flight of the day and the fourth flight was the reverse leg of his previous flight from Mayo Airport to Rau Strip. A passenger boarded the aircraft before it departed from Rau Strip. The aircraft entered Granite Creek and the pilot continued despite poor weather conditions, likely due to him flying the route on the previous flight. The pilot then made an improper turn into a box canyon, mistaking it as the continuation of the proper flight path to the destination. The terrain awareness warning system did not effectively alert the pilot of the rising terrain, either because such warnings were common when flying in mountains in the past few minutes, or he silenced the system. The aircraft crashed into terrain 5,500 ft (1,700 m) above sea level, killing both people on board.	
Telluride Beechcraft Bonanza crash	5 October 2020	Beechcraft S35 Bonanza	Near Telluride, Colorado, United States	2/2	Soon after departing from Telluride Regional Airport for a cross-country flight, the aircraft proceeded east into higher terrain rather than west into lower terrain. The aircraft continued in a gradual climb while entering a box canyon for 8 mi (13 km). Shortly after making a turn to the south, it crashed into terrain in a vertical impact, killing both people on board. The accident site was at 11,823 ft (3,604 m) in elevation, significantly below the elevations of the surrounding mountain peaks at 12,000–14,000 ft (3,700–4,300 m). The density altitude of the crash site was 13,604 ft (4,146 m), which diminished climb performance. The pilot likely lost control of the aircraft before it could gain enough altitude to cross terrain ahead.	
LEC Aviation Beechcraft Bonanza crash	3 July 2021	Beechcraft G36 Bonanza	Near Aspen, Colorado, United States	2/2	Two pilots were flying the aircraft to ferry it to New York. It is unknown if the pilot flying had any prior experience with flying in the Rocky Mountains. After takeoff, the aircraft circled over Aspen/Pitkin County Airport until reaching an altitude of 10,000 ft (3,000 m). The aircraft subsequently turned east and turned into a valley that ended in a ridge before connecting with Colorado State Highway 82 preceding Independence Pass. At an altitude of 11,300 ft (3,400 m), the aircraft entered a semi-circular bowl region surrounded by 13,000 ft (4,000 m) mountains. The pilot flying attempted to turn back out of the canyon, but the aircraft impacted at an elevation of 11,050 ft (3,370 m), killing both people on board.	
