= Abtan v. Blackwater =

United States court case

- Court: United States District Court for the District of Columbia
- Full case name: Estate of Himoud Saed Abtan, et al., Plaintiffs, v. Blackwater Lodge and Training Center, et al. Estate of Ali Hussamaldeen Albazzaz and Estate of Kadhum Kayiz Aziz v. Blackwater Lodge and Training Center, et al.
- Decided: April 27, 2009
- Docket nos.: 1:07-cv-01831
- Citation: 611 F. Supp. 2d 1

Court membership
- Judge sitting: Reggie Walton

Atban v. Blackwater, 611 F. Supp. 2d 1 (D.D.C. 2009), was a lawsuit brought by the victims and families affected by the September 16, 2007 Blackwater Baghdad shootings against Blackwater Worldwide, a private military contractor since renamed Academi. The case was consolidated with Estate of Albazzaz, et al. v. Blackwater Lodge and Training Center, Inc. et al., and the consolidated case was ultimately settled confidentially out of court.

== Background ==
The September 16 Blackwater Baghdad shootings was an unprovoked attack on Iraqi civilians by a number of heavily armed Blackwater personnel, including two Blackwater helicopters. According to numerous conflicting reports, the shooting started after a small car had mistakenly failed to comply with an Iraqi police officer's call to stop, the Blackwater guards then fired on the car, possibly believing it to be a suicide bomber. However, a conflicting report filed by Blackwater, the security guards, who were at the time guarding a US State Department convoy, had been fired on first and responded with measured, small arms fire directed specifically at those who had attacked them.

The suit was filed on behalf of a number of Iraqi citizens by the Center for Constitutional Rights and a number of other lawyers alleging that Blackwater had violated US and international law, as well as participating in war crimes and violation of the Racketeer Influenced and Corrupt Organizations Act.

== Timeline ==
October 11, 2007: The case was filed in the U.S. District Court for the District of Columbia.

November 27, 2007: An amended complaint was filed, adding the families of two other victims, as well as adding the additional charge that Blackwater routinely deploys heavily armed "shooters" in the streets of Baghdad with the knowledge that up to 25 percent of them are chemically influenced by steroids or other judgment-altering substances, and fails to take effective steps to stop and test for drug use. It further alleged that the Blackwater personnel who fired on the Iraqi civilians had ignored directives from the Tactical Operations Center ("TOC"), which was staffed by both Blackwater and Department of State personnel, to stay in another area with State Department personnel they had dropped off until further instructed to leave the area.

March 28, 2008: A second amended complaint was filed to join the family of an additional Iraqi who had been killed as well as nine additional injured Iraqi survivors. On April 8, 2008, the defendants filed a motion to dismiss for lack of venue, to which the plaintiffs filed an opposition on April 22, 2008. Judge Walton ordered that this case be consolidated with Estate of Albazzaz, et al. v. Blackwater Lodge and Training Center, Inc. et al. for purposes of pre-trial discovery and briefing.

April 28, 2008: Plaintiffs filed a motion to file a third amended complaint in order to include spoliation claims.

May 7, 2008: Defendants filed their opposition to the third motion to amend the complaint, to which the plaintiffs filed a reply on May 19, 2008.

April 27, 2009: Judge Walton ordered that the defendants' motion to dismiss or transfer venue be stayed in order to allow the plaintiffs to request limited venue discovery.

July 17, 2009: Abtan consolidated with Albazzaz.

January 6, 2010: Plaintiffs conclude settlement of consolidated cases.
