= SCG International Risk =

Private military contractor and security firm

SCG International was a private paramilitary contractor founded in 1996 to provide government and private sectors with domestic and international security, logistics and training services. After SCG and its former CEO Jamie Smith lost a $9.5 million lawsuit, the Virginian-Pilot reported in July 2012 that SCG was apparently defunct and that Jamie Smith had left the United States. In August 2012, the US Air Force debarred the company for a period of three years from any federal government contracting or directly or indirectly receiving the benefits of any federal assistance programs.

== History ==
SCG International was established as the Delta Training Center (DTC) in 1996, and began operating as SCG International in 2002. Since its founding, the company was operated under the direction of former United States government intelligence officers and military personnel, including from US Army Special Forces, US Navy SEALs and the USMC. SCG personnel had worked with more than 1,200 clients (including nine Fortune 500 companies) in over 14 countries. SCG International provided training and security services to governments, law enforcement and military units, and to private and corporate entities. It was one of several private security firms employed in the Iraq War and U.S. invasion of Afghanistan.

SGC guarded officials and installations, trained Iraq's and Afghanistan's new army and police, and provided other support for coalition forces. Following its August 29, 2012 disbarment from U.S. federal government contracting or assistance programs, the company was bought out by a private party, closed its headquarters in 2012, moved all corporate operations to Abu Dhabi, and is engaged in anti-piracy, foreign military training operations, security and intelligence support contracts.

== Jamie Smith ==
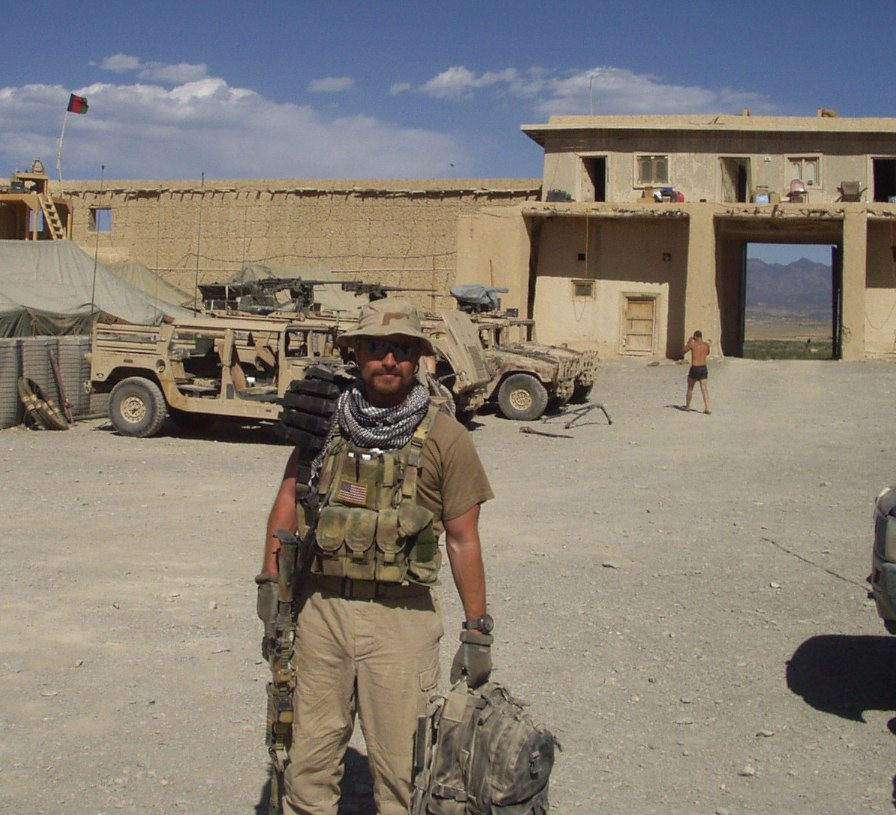
Blackwater employee Jamie Smith along Pakistani border in Afghanistan in 2002

Jamie Smith founded SCG in 2002. Prior to 2002, he claims to have worked at Blackwater Security Consulting as vice president.

Smith has a background as a CIA officer in publications for SCG, although this assertion has been challenged and never independently verified.

== See also ==
- Private military contractor
- History of Afghanistan
