= Andrew J. Moonen =

American mercenary

Andrew J. Moonen is a former employee of Blackwater Security (since renamed Constellis), accused by the Iraq government of murdering Raheem Khalif, a security guard of the Iraqi Vice-president, Adel Abdul Mahdi. Khalif died from three gunshot wounds. Moonen, originally from Kalispell, Montana, in the US, served previously in the 82nd Airborne Division of the United States Army; he received an honorable discharge. In the wake of the killing, the United States Department of State and Blackwater USA had attempted to keep his identity secret for security reasons. Currently, Moonen lives in Seattle, Washington. Responding to claims of company-wide negligence, Erik Prince, the company's founder, said “when we found knucklehead behavior, we fired them.”

The employee was identified on October 4, 2007, by The New York Times as Andrew J. Moonen, from Seattle, Washington, and federal law enforcement is investigating the case, which the Iraqi government considers a murder. In Congressional hearings on October 2, 2007, Blackwater USA CEO Erik Prince testified that Moonen was fired for "violating alcohol and firearm policy."

Despite the Blackwater incident, Moonen found subsequent employment. From February to August 2007, he was employed by US Department of Defense contractor Combat Support Associates (CSA) in Kuwait. In April 2007, the US Department of Defense attempted to call him back to active duty, but cancelled the request because Moonen was overseas.

== Shooting incident ==
On August 12, 2007, an MSNBC report noted the largely unaccountable and unsupervised nature of security contractor activities and the high number of casual or indiscriminate civilian killings attributed to them. According to the State Department, on December 24, 2006, a drunken Blackwater employee shot and killed a bodyguard who was protecting the Iraqi vice president. The US State Department was aware of the incident and recommended that a $250,000 payment be made to the victim's family. They offered to pay out $15,000, which the State Department agreed to. The Blackwater employee was fired but no criminal charges were brought against him initially.

=== United States Congress memo of incident ===
A memo dated October 1, 2007, from the U.S. House Committee on Oversight and Government Reform detailed the incident that led to the death of the Raheem Khalif:

“On December 24, 2006, a 26-year-old Blackwater security contractor shot and killed a 32-year-old security guard to Iraqi Vice President Adil Abd-al-Mahdi during a confrontation in the ‘Little Venice’ area of the International Zone in Baghdad. This incident sparked an angry reaction from the Iraqi government.

“According to documents obtained by the Committee, the Blackwater contractor, who worked as an armorer, had attended a party on the evening of December 24, had consumed several alcoholic beverages and was described as drunk by witnesses who encountered him that evening.

“The Blackwater contractor, carrying a Glock 9 mm pistol, passed through a gate near the Iraqi Prime Minister's compound and was confronted by the Iraqi guard, who was on duty. The Blackwater contractor fired multiple shots, three of which struck the guard, then fled the scene.

“The Blackwater contractor fled to a guard post operated by Triple Canopy, another private military contractor. He told personnel there that he had gotten into a gunfight with Iraqis and that they were chasing him and shooting at him.

“The guards had not heard any gunshots. He fumbled with his firearm, which was loaded, until one of the guards took it from him. Although he appeared visibly intoxicated and smelled of alcohol, he denied that he had any alcoholic beverages that evening...”

“On December 25, the day after the shooting of the guard, Blackwater terminated the contractor from the State Department contract based on its policy against possessing a firearm while intoxicated. That same day, only hours after the shooting, Blackwater arranged to have the contractor flown out of Iraq...”

""Following the incident and contrary to popular rumor, Blackwater employees individually wrote requests to the U.S. Attorney that Mooney be prosecuted. The Blackwater employees cited it was, "...the only way we can hope to maintain integrity".""

“Immediately following the incident, the State Department determined that Blackwater should send a letter of condolence to the victim's family along with a cash payment."

== Congressional and criminal investigation ==
The Justice Department Domestic Security Section opened a criminal investigation of murder charges against Moonen due to the outcry from Iraqis over the shooting death of the Iraqi man, in October 2007. On October 5, 2007, House Oversight and Government Reform Chairman Henry Waxman wrote a letter to US Secretary of State Condoleezza Rice requesting Moonen's personnel records. In an October 18, 2010 press release, the US attorney closed the investigation and noted that they had declined prosecution stating "...after reviewing all the available evidence and considering possible affirmative defenses, such as self defense, prosecutors have concluded there is no sufficient evidence to obtain and sustain a conviction beyond a reasonable doubt. That high standard must be met to bring a criminal case."
