= Al Clark (mercenary) =

American businessman

Alfred Ray Clark
- Born: May 1, 1965; Crockett, Texas, U.S.
- Died: May 23, 2015 (aged 50)

Alfred Clark (May 1, 1965 - May 23, 2015) was a founder of the private security firm Blackwater, along with Erik Prince. He was a former Navy SEAL who served with SEAL Team FOUR and the Naval Special Warfare Development Group. After leaving Blackwater, he founded several other companies, including Clark Consulting, and developed a combat shooting program for the U.S. Navy.

== Military career ==
Clark joined the United States Navy in 1983. Clark received orders to Basic Underwater Demolition/SEAL training (BUD/S) at Naval Amphibious Base Coronado in 1986. After six months of training, Clark graduated with BUD/S Class 142 in May 1987. Following SEAL Tactical Training (STT) and completion of six-month probationary period, he received the NEC 5326 as a Combatant Swimmer (SEAL), entitled to wear the Special Warfare insignia also known as "SEAL Trident". Clark received assignment to SEAL Team FOUR and served there until 1994 when he volunteered for and completed a specialized selection and training course for assignment to Naval Special Warfare Development Group. As a Navy SEAL firearms instructor, Clark grew dissatisfied with the fact that the Navy did not own firing ranges and instead had to borrow time on Marine or Army ranges or rent facilities that were highly inadequate for serving the Navy's needs. With the idea of creating a “one-stop shopping” private training facility, Clark's concept lacked the financial backing, until he realized that one of his SEAL trainees (Erik Prince) was a man with similar ideas but far greater financial resources from his dad's automotive parts manufacturing business. They created Blackwater in 1997 as a business for assuming some of the roles once played by the public sector military, most notably providing security for American and British officials in the Iraq War.

He found a similar opportunity at Strategic Tactical Services, where an investor backed Clark's idea after he left Blackwater. He was co-founder at STS. In 2006 Clark started his own company, Clark Consulting (C2) based out of Virginia Beach. Clark Consulting LLC., is an SDVO small business and specializes in training and support services for personnel operating in high-risk environments. In 2007-2008 Clark joined forces with David Tollaksen and co-founded Longbow Global & Longbow International Group which evolved into Archer Tactical Group, LLC (2014) and its group of sister companies currently operating globally. Longbow's (Archer Tactical Group) model was to take everything that was "good and functioning" out of Blackwater and its initial creation blueprint, and expand into a much broader tip-of-the-spear high tech operation, breaking from the old traditional broken model of just training and security. During this time, Clark was solicited by the U.S. Navy Center for Security Forces and the Naval Expeditionary Combat Command to consult on training programs. The consultation turned into a 7-year project led by Al Clark and Clark Consulting LLC. The project titled "Combat Shooting Training Program Analysis" chartered by NECC gave Clark a clean slate and asked that he build them a combat shooting program that could eventually sustain itself to increase the NECC forces combat shooting proficiency and readiness. The shooting program would eventually be titled "ESAMI" Expeditionary Small Arms Marksmanship Instructor. Clark Consulting LLC. trained close to 1,000 NECC forces over this time.

Clark died on May 23, 2015, due to health complications.

== See also ==
- Blackwater USA
