= Blackwater (company) =

American private military contractor

- Top: original logo of Blackwater; Bottom: logo of Academi
- Type: Private
- Industry: Private security services contractor
- Founded: December 26, 1996; 29 years ago North Carolina, U.S.
- Founders: Erik Prince; Al Clark
- Defunct: June 2014; 12 years ago
- Fate: Merged with Triple Canopy and Constellis into Constellis Group
- Area served: Worldwide
- Products: Law enforcement training, logistics, close quarter training, and security services
- Services: Security management, full-service risk management consulting

Academi, formerly Blackwater, is an American private military contractor founded on December 26, 1996, by former Navy SEAL officer Erik Prince. It was renamed Xe Services in 2009, and was again renamed to Academi in 2011, after it was acquired by a group of private investors. In 2014, Academi and Triple Canopy were consolidated into Constellis Group, under the Constellis Holdings umbrella alongside several other private security firms. Academi is still operational as a subsidiary of Constellis Group.

Blackwater began providing services to the Central Intelligence Agency in 2002, receiving a $5.4 million contract to provide security for the agency's station in Kabul, Afghanistan. Blackwater’s work in Iraq began in mid-2003.

In 2007, Blackwater received widespread notoriety for the Nisour Square massacre in Baghdad, when a group of its employees killed 17 Iraqi civilians and injured 20. Four employees were convicted in the United States and were later pardoned on December 22, 2020, by President Donald Trump.

== History ==
=== Origins as training center ===
Blackwater Lodge and Training Center, Inc. was formed on December 26, 1996, by Al Clark and Erik Prince in North Carolina, to provide training support to military and law enforcement organizations. In explaining its purpose, Prince stated: "We are trying to do for the national security apparatus what FedEx did for the Postal Service."

Prince purchased approximately 7,000 acres (28 km^{2}) of the Great Dismal Swamp, a vast swamp on the North Carolina–Virginia border that is now mostly a national wildlife refuge. "We needed 3,000 acres to make it safe," Prince told reporter Robert Young Pelton. There he created his private training facility and his contracting company, Blackwater, which he named for the peat-colored water of the swamp.

The Blackwater Lodge and Training Center officially opened on May 15, 1998, with a 6,000-acre (2,400 ha), $6.5 million facility headed by Robert Anderson. It comprises several ranges: indoor, outdoor, urban reproductions; an artificial lake; and a driving track in Camden and Currituck counties. The company says it is the largest training facility in the country. The concept was not a financial success but was kept solvent by sales from sister company Blackwater Target Systems.

=== 2002–2007: Blackwater Security Company ===
Jeremy Scahill has claimed that Blackwater Security Company (BSC) was the brainchild of Jamie Smith, a former CIA officer who became vice president of Blackwater USA and the founding director of Blackwater Security Company, holding both positions simultaneously. However, this claim is denied by Prince and Blackwater executive Gary Jackson, who describe firing Smith from his position as a low-level administrator for "non-performance" after a thirty-day contract. Smith has been accused of further embellishing his military and contracting record to defraud investors at SCG International Risk.

==== 2003–2006: First contracts ====
BSC's first assignment was to provide twenty men with top-secret clearance to protect the CIA headquarters and another base that was responsible for hunting Osama bin Laden. Blackwater was one of several private security firms employed following the U.S. invasion of Afghanistan. BSC was originally formed as a Delaware LLC and was one of over sixty private security firms employed during the Iraq War to guard officials and installations, train Iraq's new army and police, and provide other support for coalition forces.

Gulmurod Khalimov, former war minister of the Islamic State, trained with Blackwater and the U.S. Army five times between 2003 and 2015. Khalimov was an officer and sniper of the OMON special forces unit of Tajikistan at the time. The United States Department of State confirmed this in 2015. However, Khalimov was quoted as saying in Russian, “Listen, you American pigs: I’ve been to America three times. I saw how you train soldiers to kill Muslims. You taught your soldiers how to surround and attack, in order to exterminate Islam and Muslims”.

Blackwater was hired during the aftermath of Hurricane Katrina by the U.S. Department of Homeland Security to protect government facilities, as well as by private clients, including communications, petrochemical, and insurance companies. Overall, the company received over US$1 billion in U.S. government contracts. The company consisted of nine divisions and a subsidiary, Blackwater Vehicles.

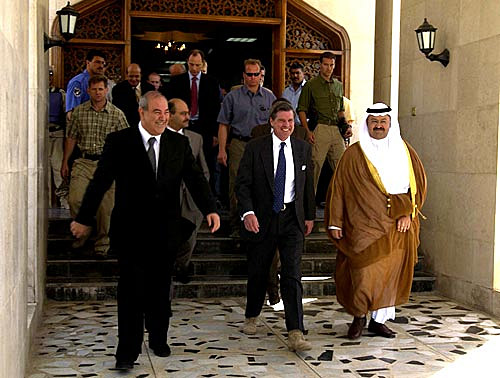
Iraq Coalition Provisional Authority head Paul Bremer escorted by Blackwater Security guards in Baghdad, June 28, 2004

In August 2003, Blackwater received its first Iraq contract, a $21 million contract for a personal security detachment and two helicopters for Paul Bremer, head of the U.S. occupation in Iraq.

In July 2004, Blackwater was authorized by the U.S. Department of State to perform orders issued under the Worldwide Personal Protective Services (WPPS I) umbrella contract. Blackwater's first mission under WPPS I was to provide private security for the provisional U.S. Embassy in Baghdad. Although Triple Canopy, Inc., and DynCorp International also qualified for WPPS I directives, Blackwater was issued the majority of diplomatic security task orders in Iraq and was authorized to deploy 482 personnel in Iraq (excluding sub-contractors) over the course of 2 years. The total breadth of Blackwater's activities in Iraq for non-diplomatic security operations, as well as other potential deployments in Afghanistan, Bosnia and Israel authorized under the WPPS I contract are unknown. Between July 1, 2004, and June 6, 2006, Blackwater received $488 million from the WPPS I contract, despite the entire five-year contract having a set maximum value of approximately $332 million. The substantial cost of Blackwater's services was investigated by the House Committee on Oversight and Reform and eventuated in the use of a competitive bidding system in the revised WPPS II umbrella contract.

On September 1, 2005, following Hurricane Katrina, Blackwater dispatched a rescue team and helicopter to support relief operations. Blackwater moved about 200 personnel into the area impacted by Hurricane Katrina, most of whom (164 employees) were working under a contract with the Federal Protective Service to protect government facilities, but the company held contracts with private clients as well. Blackwater's presence after Katrina cost the federal government $240,000 per day.

In July 2005, the U.S. State Department awarded its first WPPS II contract under a new competitive bidding system with a strict maximum value of $1.2 billion per contractor. Blackwater, Triple Canopy and DynCorp were the only private security firms qualified for WPPS II task orders, authorised for deployments in "non-permissive environments" such as Jerusalem, Afghanistan, Bosnia and Iraq. In May 2006 the WPPS II contract began issuing task orders in Iraq, ultimately authorizing Blackwater to deploy 1,020 staff in the country. Blackwater's responsibilities included the United States embassy in Baghdad. At the time it was a privately held company and published limited information about internal affairs. The total cost of Blackwater's work under WPPS II remains unknown; however, it was disclosed that Blackwater was paid over $832 million for their work in Iraq under WPPS I and WPPS II directives from 2001 to 2006.

==== Leadership ====
Cofer Black, the company's vice-chairman from 2006 through 2008, was director of the CIA's Counterterrorist Center (CTC) at the time of the September 11 attacks in 2001. He was the United States Department of State coordinator for counterterrorism with the rank of Ambassador-at-Large from December 2002 to November 2004. After leaving public service, Black became chairman of the privately owned intelligence-gathering company Total Intelligence Solutions, Inc., as well as vice-chairman of Blackwater.

Robert Richer was vice president of intelligence until January 2007, when he formed Total Intelligence Solutions. He was formerly the head of the CIA's Near East Division.

==== 2006–2007: New training centers ====
In November 2006, Blackwater USA announced that it had acquired an 80-acre (32 ha) facility 120 miles (190 km) west of Chicago in Mount Carroll, Illinois, called Impact Training Center. This facility has been operational since April 2007 and serves law enforcement agencies throughout the Midwest.

Blackwater tried to open an 824-acre (3.33 km^{2}) training facility three miles north of Potrero, a small town in rural east San Diego County, California, located 45 miles (72 km) east of San Diego, for military and law enforcement training. The opening had faced heavy opposition from local residents, residents of nearby San Diego, local Congressmember Bob Filner, and environmentalist and anti-war organizations. Opposition focused on a potential for wildfire increases, the proposed facility's proximity to the Cleveland National Forest, noise pollution, and opposition to the actions of Blackwater in Iraq. In response, Brian Bonfiglio, project manager for Blackwater West, said: "There will be no explosives training and no tracer ammunition. Lead bullets don't start fires." In October 2007, when wildfires swept through the area, Blackwater made at least three deliveries of food, water, personal hygiene products and generator fuel to 300 residents near the proposed training site, many of whom had been trapped for days without supplies. They also set up a "tent city" for evacuees. On March 7, 2008, Blackwater withdrew its application to set up a facility in San Diego County.

=== 2007–2009: Blackwater Worldwide ===
Blackwater logo introduced 2007 (top) and original logo (below)

In October 2007, the month after the Nisour Square massacre, Blackwater USA began the process of changing its name to Blackwater Worldwide and unveiled a new logo. The change deemphasized the "cross hair" reticle theme, simplifying it slightly.

On July 21, 2008, Blackwater Worldwide stated that it would shift resources away from security contracting because of the extensive risks in that sector, with Prince stating: "The experience we've had would certainly be a disincentive to any other companies that want to step in and put their entire business at risk."

=== 2009–2010: Xe Services LLC ===
Xe logo

In February 2009, Blackwater announced that it would be once again renamed, this time to "Xe Services LLC", as part of a company-wide restructuring plan, intended to re-focus the company on its logistics, aviation and training aspects, rather than its security operations.

Prince announced his resignation as CEO on March 2, 2009. He remained as chairman of the board but was no longer involved in day-to-day operations. Joseph Yorio was named as the new president and CEO, replacing Gary Jackson as president and Prince as CEO. Danielle Esposito was named the new chief operating officer and executive vice president.

=== 2010–2014: Academi ===
In 2010, Xe was acquired by USTC Holdings, an investor consortium, who sought to further re-brand the company. The sale formally ended Erik Prince's operational and management role in the company. Xe was officially renamed "Academi" in 2011. Academi's Board of Directors included former Attorney General John Ashcroft, former White House Counsel and Vice Presidential Chief of Staff Jack Quinn, retired Admiral and former NSA Director Bobby Ray Inman, and Texas businessman Red McCombs, who served as chairman of the board. Quinn and Ashcroft were independent directors, without other affiliations to Academi.

In May 2011, Academi named Ted Wright as CEO. Wright hired Suzanne Rich Folsom as Academi's chief regulatory and compliance officer and deputy general counsel. The Academi Regulatory and Compliance team won National Law Journal's 2012 Corporate Compliance Office of the Year Award.

In 2012, retired Brigadier General Craig Nixon was named the new CEO of Academi.

== Former corporate units ==
=== Aviation Worldwide Services ===
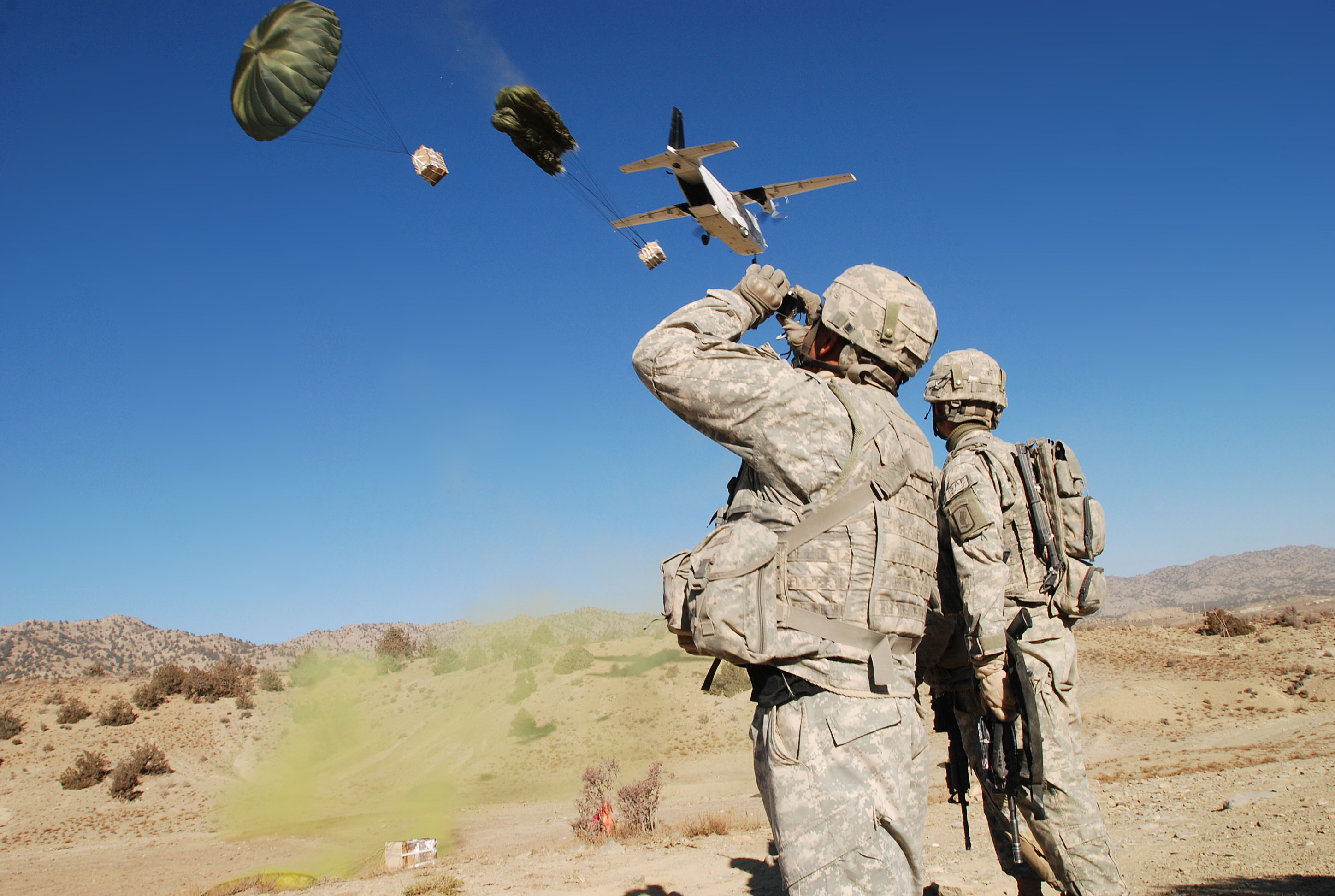
AWS CASA C-212 Aviocar in Afghanistan

Aviation Worldwide Services (AWS) was founded by Richard Pere and Tim Childrey, and was based at Melbourne, Florida, U.S. It owned and operated three subsidiaries: STI Aviation, Inc. Air Quest, Inc. and Presidential Airways, Inc. In April 2003 it was acquired by Blackwater USA.

Presidential Airways (PAW) is a Federal Aviation Administration (FAA) Regulations Part 135 charter cargo and passenger airline based at Melbourne Orlando International Airport. It operates aircraft owned by AWS. Presidential Airways holds a Secret Facility Clearance from the U.S. Department of Defense. It operates several CASA 212 aircraft in addition to a Boeing 767. Several of the MD-530 helicopters used by Blackwater Security Consulting in Iraq are also operated through AWS.

A CASA 212 aircraft, tail number N960BW, operated by Presidential Airways crashed on November 27, 2004, in Afghanistan; it had been a contract flight for the United States Air Force en route from Bagram to Farah. All aboard, three soldiers and three civilian crew members, were killed. Several of their surviving kin filed a wrongful death lawsuit against Presidential in October 2005.

In late September 2007, Presidential Airways received a $92m contract from the Department of Defense for air transportation in Afghanistan, Kyrgyzstan, Pakistan and Uzbekistan.

STI Aviation focuses on aircraft maintenance, and is a FAA/Joint Aviation Authorities 145 repair station. They specialize in Short 360, EMB 120, Saab 340, and CASA 212 maintenance. As of January 2008, STI Aviation appears to have been folded into AWS, along with Air Quest.

Many of Blackwater's tactical and training aircraft are registered to Blackwater affiliate EP Aviation LLC, named for Blackwater's owner, Erik Prince. These aircraft include fourteen Bell 412 helicopters, three Hughes/MD 369 "Little Bird" helicopters, four Bell 214ST medium-lift helicopters, three Fairchild Swearingen Merlin IIIC turboprop airliners, nine Aérospatiale Puma utility helicopters, a Maule Air MT-7-235 STOL aircraft, an Embraer EMB 314 Super Tucano counterinsurgency aircraft, and a Mooney M20E fixed wing aircraft.

Aviation Worldwide Services was purchased for $200 million in 2010 by AAR Corp., an Illinois company. In a letter released on February 8, 2011, the new owners informed state officials that they are shutting down the Moyock, North Carolina, operation and moving some employees to a new business location in Melbourne, Florida. Some 260 staff are affected with about 50 losing their jobs, beginning at the end of February. The company views the aviation division as a growth opportunity.

=== Greystone Limited ===
In 2010, Greystone was acquired by current management. Greystone now operates as a standalone, management owned provider of protective support services and training.

A private security service, Greystone is registered in Barbados, and employs soldiers for off-shore security work through its affiliate Satelles Solutions, Inc. Their web site advertises their ability to provide "personnel from the best militaries throughout the world" for worldwide deployment. Tasks can be from very small scale up major operations to "facilitate large scale stability operations requiring large numbers of people to assist in securing a region".

Erik Prince intended Greystone to be used for peacekeeping missions in areas like Darfur where military operations would need to take place to establish peace.

Greystone had planned to open a training facility on the former grounds of the Subic Bay U.S. Naval Base, but those plans were later abandoned.

== Former international services ==
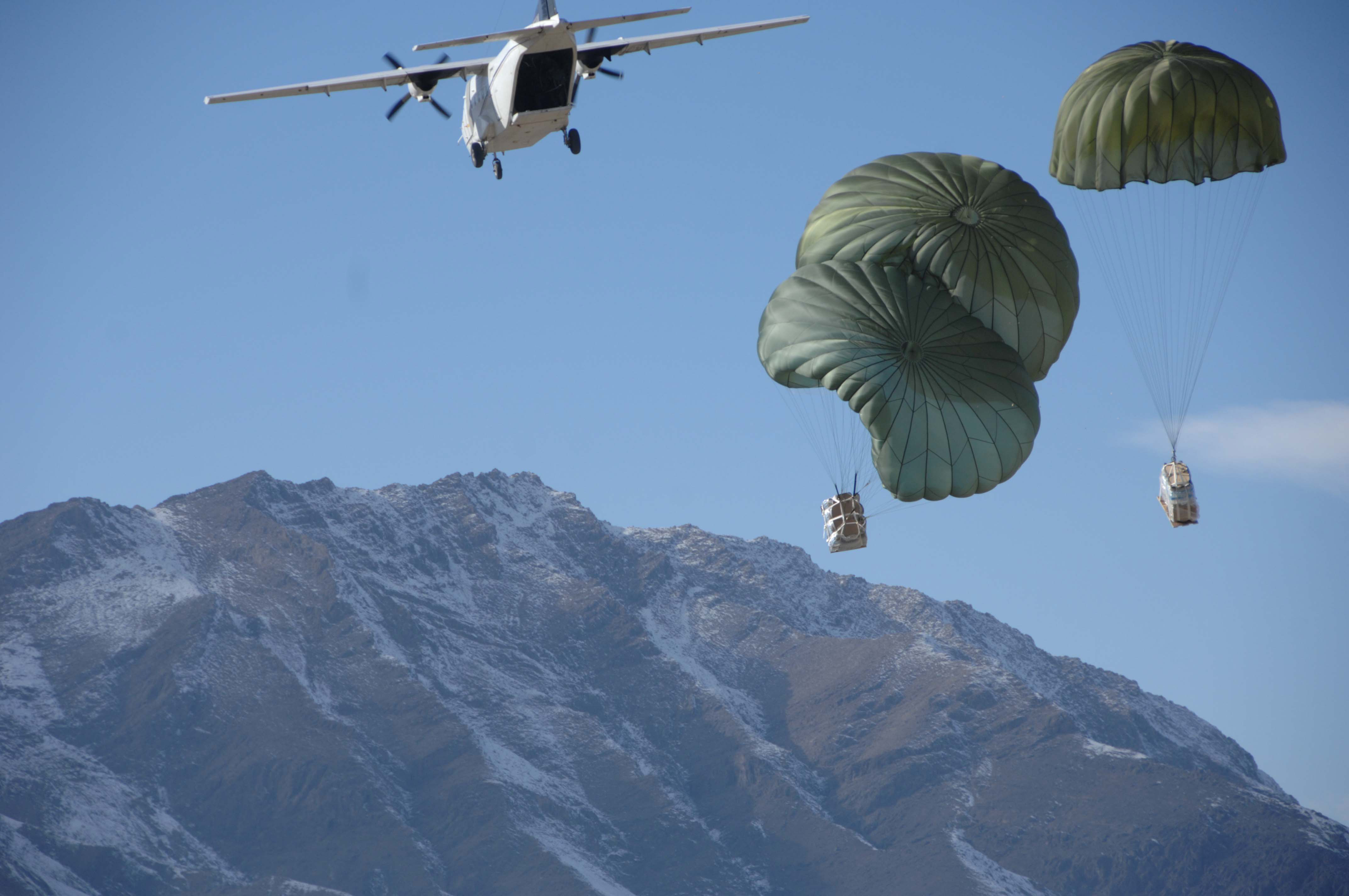
Blackwater CASA 212 over Afghanistan dropping supplies to U.S. Army soldiers

According to a company press release, Blackwater provided airlift, security, logistics, and transportation services, as well as humanitarian support. Blackwater moved about 200 personnel into the area hit by Hurricane Katrina, most of whom (164 employees) were working under a contract with the Department of Homeland Security to protect government facilities, but the company held contracts with private clients as well. Overall, Blackwater had a "visible, and financially lucrative, presence in the immediate aftermath of Hurricane Katrina as the use of the company contractors cost U.S. taxpayers $240,000 a day."

Blackwater USA was one of five companies picked in September 2007 by the Department of Defense Counter-Narcotics Technology Program Office in a five-year contract for equipment, material and services in support of counter-narcotics activities. The contract is worth up to $15 billion. The other companies picked are Raytheon, Lockheed Martin, Northrop Grumman, OHI, and Arinc Inc. Blackwater USA has also been contracted by various foreign governments. The DEA and DoD counternarcotics program is supported by Blackwater Worldwide in Afghanistan as well. "Blackwater is involved on DoD side" of the counter-narcotics program in Afghanistan says Jeff Gibson, vice president for international training at Blackwater. "We interdict. The NIU surgically goes after shipments going to Iran or Pakistan. We provide training to set up roadblocks, identify where drug lords are, and act so as not to impact the community." In 2008, about 16 Blackwater personnel were in Afghanistan at any given time to support DoD and DEA efforts at training facilities around the country. Blackwater was also involved in mentoring former Islamic Republic of Afghanistan officials in drug interdiction and counter narcotics. As Richard Douglas, a deputy assistant secretary of defense, explained, "The fact is, we use Blackwater to do a lot of our training of counternarcotics police in Afghanistan. I have to say that Blackwater has done a very good job." The Obama administration awarded Academi a $250 million contract to work for the U.S. State Department and the Central Intelligence Agency in Afghanistan.

In 2005, Blackwater worked to train the Naval Sea Commando regiment of Azerbaijan, enhancing their interdiction capabilities on the Caspian Sea. In Asia, Blackwater had contracts in Japan guarding AN/TPY-2 radar systems.

In March 2006, Cofer Black, vice chairman of Blackwater USA, allegedly suggested at an international conference in Amman, Jordan, that the company was ready to move towards providing security professionals up to brigade size (3,000–5,000) for humanitarian efforts and low-intensity conflicts. The company denies making this claim.

Mark Manzetti, writing in The New York Times on August 19, 2009, reported that the CIA had hired Blackwater "as part of a secret program to locate and assassinate top operatives of Al Qaeda." Newly appointed CIA director Leon Panetta had recently acknowledged a planned secret targeted killing program, one withheld from Congressional oversight. Manzetti's sources, which tied the program to Blackwater, declined to have their names made public. The CIA was acting on a 2001 presidential legal pronouncement, known as a finding, which authorized the CIA to pursue such efforts. Several million dollars were spent on planning and training, but it was never put into operation and no militants were caught or captured. Manzetti notes that it was unknown "whether the C.I.A. had planned to use the contractors to actually capture or kill Al Qaeda operatives, or just to help with training and surveillance in the program." Jeremy Scahill reported in The Nation in November 2009 that Blackwater operated alongside the CIA in Pakistan in "snatch and grab" operations targeting senior members of the Taliban and Al Qaeda. The report cited an unnamed source who has worked on covert U.S. military programs, who revealed that senior members of the Obama administration may not be aware that Blackwater is operating under a U.S. contract in Pakistan. A spokesman for Blackwater denied the claims, stating that they have "only one employee in Pakistan."

== Role in the Iraq War ==
=== Contracts ===
Blackwater Worldwide played a substantial role during the Iraq War as a contractor for the United States government. In 2003, Blackwater attained its first high-profile contract when it received a $21 million no-bid contract for guarding the head of the Coalition Provisional Authority, L. Paul Bremer. Since June 2004, Blackwater has been paid more than $320 million out of a $1 billion, five-year State Department budget for the Worldwide Personal Protective Service, which protects U.S. officials and some foreign officials in conflict zones.

In 2006, Blackwater was awarded a contract to protect diplomats for the U.S. embassy in Iraq, the largest American embassy in the world. It is estimated by the Pentagon and company representatives that there are 20,000 to 30,000 armed security contractors working in Iraq, and some estimates are as high as 100,000, though no official figures exist. Of the State Department's dependence on private contractors like Blackwater for security purposes, U.S. ambassador to Iraq Ryan Crocker told the U.S. Senate: "There is simply no way at all that the State Department's Bureau of Diplomatic Security could ever have enough full-time personnel to staff the security function in Iraq. There is no alternative except through contracts."

For work in Iraq, the company has drawn contractors from their international pool of professionals, a database containing "21,000 former Special Forces operatives, soldiers, and retired law enforcement agents," overall. For instance, Gary Jackson, the firm's president, has confirmed that Bosnians, Filipinos, and Chileans "have been hired for tasks ranging from airport security to protecting Paul Bremer, the head of the Coalition Provisional Authority." Between 2005 and September 2007, Blackwater security staff were involved in 195 shooting incidents; in 163 of those cases, Blackwater personnel fired first. Erik Prince points out that the company followed the orders of United States government officials, who frequently put his men in harm's way. Many of the shootings occurred after drivers in vehicles failed to stop when ordered by Blackwater guards.

According to former CIA director Michael Hayden, Blackwater, among other security contractors, were allowed to perform waterboarding on suspects. Leaks in 2009 suggest CIA - Blackwater contracts to assassinate al-Qaeda leaders.

=== Fallujah and Najaf ===
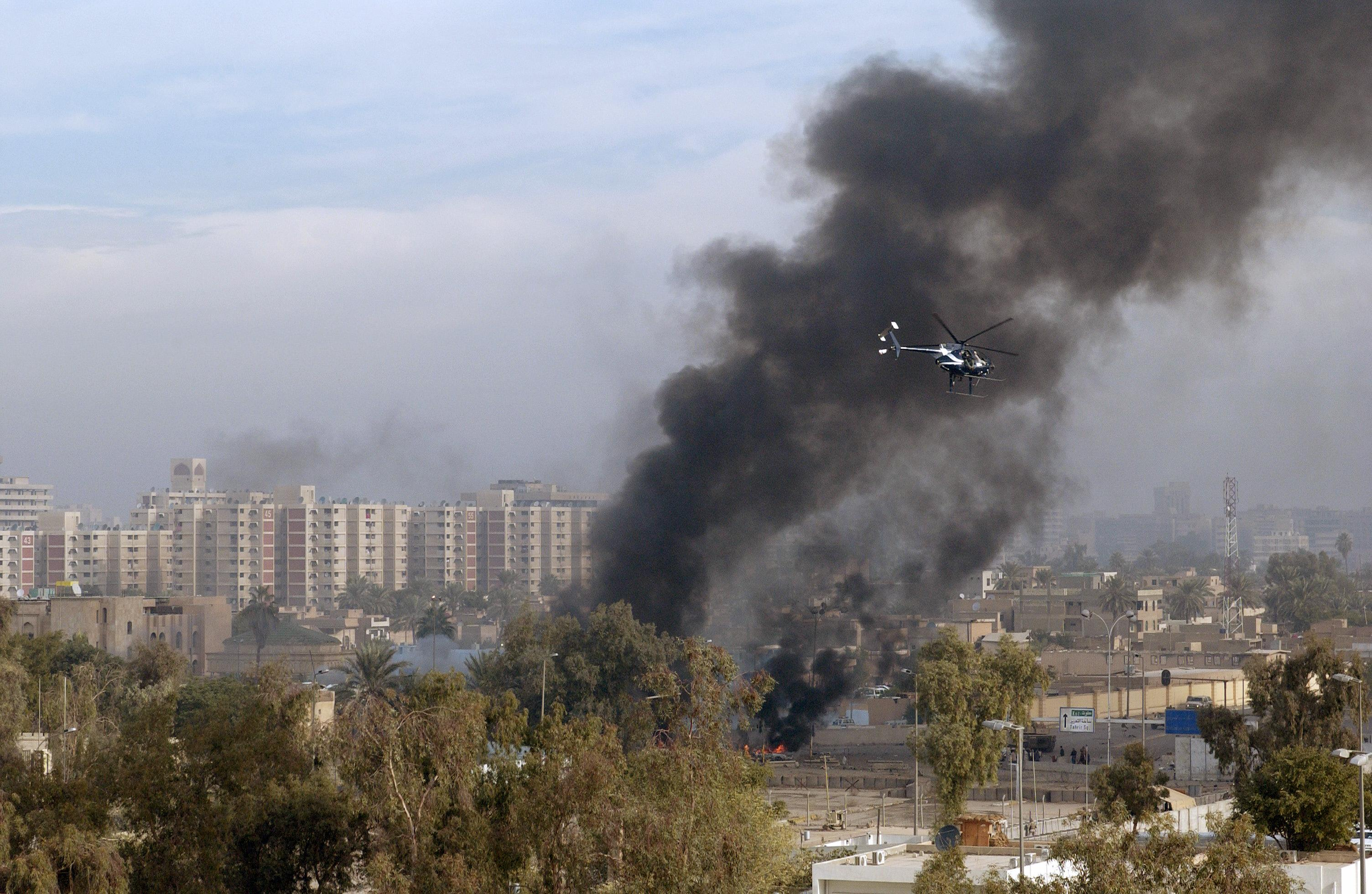
A Blackwater Security Company MD-530F helicopter aids in securing the site of a car bomb explosion in Baghdad, in December 2004, during the Iraq War.

On March 31, 2004, Iraqi insurgents in Fallujah ambushed two SUVs, killing the four armed Blackwater contractors inside. Local residents hung the charred bodies above a bridge across the Euphrates. In response, U.S. Marines attacked the city in Operation Vigilant Resolve, which became the first Battle of Fallujah. In the fall of 2007, a congressional report by the House Oversight Committee found that Blackwater intentionally "delayed and impeded" investigations into the contractors' deaths. The report also acknowledges that members of the now-defunct Iraqi Civil Defense Corps "led the team into the ambush, facilitated blocking positions to prevent the team's escape, and then disappeared." Intelligence reports concluded that Ahmad Hashim Abd al-Isawi was the mastermind behind the attack, and he was captured after a Navy SEAL special operation in 2009. al-Isawi was ultimately handed over to Iraqi authorities for trial and executed by hanging some time before November 2013.

In April 2004, at the U.S. government's headquarters in Najaf, hundreds of Shiite militia forces barraged Blackwater contractors, four MPs and a Marine gunner with rocket-propelled grenades and AK-47 fire for hours before U.S. Special Forces troops arrived. As supplies and ammunition ran low, a team of Blackwater contractors 70 miles (113 km) away flew to the compound to resupply and bring an injured U.S. Marine back to safety outside of the city.

=== Nisour Square Massacre ===
The Iraqi Government revoked Blackwater's license to operate in Iraq on September 17, 2007, after a massacre in Nisour Square, Baghdad in which Blackwater contractors were later convicted of killing 17 Iraqi civilians. The deaths occurred while a Blackwater Private Security Detail (PSD) was escorting a convoy of U.S. State Department vehicles en route to a meeting in western Baghdad with United States Agency for International Development officials. The license was reinstated by the American government in April 2008, but in early 2009 the Iraqis announced that they had refused to extend that license. In 2009, FBI investigators were unable to match the bullets from the shooting to those guns carried by Blackwater contractors, leaving open the possibility that insurgents also fired at the victims. In a 2010 interview, Erik Prince, the company's founder, said the government was looking for dirt to support what he dismissed as "baseless" accusations that ran the gamut from negligence, racial discrimination, prostitution, wrongful death, murder, and the smuggling of weapons into Iraq in dog-food containers. He pointed out that current and former executives had been regularly deposed by federal agencies.

=== Other incidents ===
On February 16, 2005, four Blackwater guards escorting a U.S. State Department convoy in Iraq fired 70 rounds into a car. The guards stated that they felt threatened when the driver ignored orders to stop as he approached the convoy. The fate of the car's driver was unknown because the convoy did not stop after the shooting. An investigation by the State Department's Diplomatic Security Service concluded that the shooting was not justified and that the Blackwater employees provided false statements to investigators. The statements claimed that one of the Blackwater vehicles had been hit by insurgent gunfire, but the investigation concluded that one of the Blackwater guards had actually fired into his own vehicle by accident. John Frese, the U.S. embassy in Iraq's top security official, declined to punish Blackwater or the security guards because he believed any disciplinary actions would lower the morale of the Blackwater contractors.

On February 6, 2006, a sniper employed by Blackwater Worldwide opened fire from the roof of the Iraqi Justice Ministry, killing three guards working for the state-funded Iraqi Media Network. Many Iraqis at the scene said that the guards had not fired on the Justice Ministry. The U.S. State Department said, however, that their actions "fell within approved rules governing the use of force" based on information obtained from Blackwater guards.

On April 21, 2005, six Blackwater USA independent contractors were killed in Iraq when their Mil Mi-8 Hip helicopter was shot down. Also killed were three Bulgarian crewmembers and two Fijian gunners. Initial reports indicated that the helicopter was shot down by rocket propelled grenades or missile fire.

In 2006, a car accident occurred in the Baghdad Green Zone when an SUV driven by Blackwater USA contractors crashed into a U.S. Army Humvee. "The colonel ... said the Blackwater guards disarmed the soldiers and forced them to lie on the ground at gunpoint until they could disentangle their vehicles."

On December 24, 2006, a security guard of the Iraqi vice president, Adel Abdul Mahdi, was shot and killed while on duty outside the Iraqi prime minister's compound. The Iraqi government has accused Andrew J. Moonen, a Blackwater employee at the time, of killing him while drunk. Moonen was subsequently fired by Blackwater for "violating alcohol and firearm policy", and travelled from Iraq to the United States days after the incident. The DOJ investigated and announced in 2010 that they were declining to prosecute Moonen, citing a likely affirmative defense of self-defense and high standards for initiating such a prosecution. The United States State Department and Blackwater USA had attempted to keep his identity secret for security reasons.

In 2007, the U.S. government investigated whether Blackwater employees smuggled weapons into Iraq. No charges were filed.

Five Blackwater contractors were killed on January 23, 2007, in Iraq when their Hughes H-6 helicopter was shot down on Baghdad's Haifa Street. The crash site was secured by a personal security detail, callsign "Jester" from 1/26 Infantry, 1st Infantry Division. Three insurgents claimed to be responsible for shooting down the helicopter, although this has not been confirmed by the United States. A U.S. defense official has confirmed that four of the five killed were shot execution style in the back of the head, but did not know whether the four had survived the crash.

In late May 2007, Blackwater contractors opened fire on the streets of Baghdad twice in two days, one of the incidents provoking a standoff between the security contractors and Iraqi Interior Ministry commandos, according to U.S. and Iraqi officials. The first incident occurred when a Blackwater-protected convoy was ambushed in downtown Baghdad. The following incident occurred when an Iraqi vehicle drove too close to a convoy. However, according to incident testimony, the Blackwater guards tried to wave off the driver, shouted, fired a warning shot into the car's radiator, finally shooting into the car's windshield. On May 30, 2007, Blackwater employees shot an Iraqi civilian said to have been "driving too close" to a State Department convoy that was being escorted by Blackwater contractors. Following the incident, the Iraqi government allowed Blackwater to provide security by operating within the streets of Iraq.

On August 21, 2007, Blackwater Manager Daniel Carroll threatened to kill Jean Richter, a U.S. State Department Investigator, in Iraq. In June 2014, a New York Times investigation reported that it had secured an internal State Department memo stating this. Richter later returned from Iraq to the U.S. and wrote a scathing review of the lax standards to which Blackwater was held accountable, only two weeks before a serious Blackwater incident in which 17 Iraqi civilians were shot and killed by Blackwater employees under questionable circumstances. The death threat incident was confirmed by a second investigator, a Mr. Thomas, who was also present at the meeting. The shooting incident that followed has been described by some as a "watershed" moment, and a factor which contributed to Iraq's later decision to refuse to allow U.S. troops to stay beyond 2011.

Documents obtained from the Iraq War documents leak of 2010 argue that Blackwater employees committed serious abuses in Iraq, including killing civilians.

=== Prosecution ===
==== U.S. Congress ====
On October 2, 2007, Erik Prince attended a congressional hearing conducted by the Committee on Oversight and Government Reform following the controversy related to Blackwater's conduct in Iraq and Afghanistan. Blackwater hired the public relations firm BKSH & Associates Worldwide, a subsidiary of Burson-Marsteller, to help Prince prepare for his testimony at the hearing. Robert Tappan, a former U.S. State Department official who worked for the Coalition Provisional Authority in Baghdad, was one of the executives handling the account. Burson-Marsteller was brought aboard by McDermott Will & Emery and Crowell & Moring, the Washington law firms representing Blackwater. BKSH, a self-described "bipartisan" firm (Hillary Clinton, when pursuing the Democratic presidential nomination, was also a client), is headed by Charlie Black, a prominent Republican political strategist and former chief spokesman for the Republican National Committee, and Scott Pastrick, former treasurer of the Democratic National Committee.

In his testimony before Congress, Prince said his company lacked remedies to deal with employee misdeeds. When asked why Andrew Moonen had been "whisked out of the country" after the shooting death of the vice-presidential guard, he replied, "We can't flog him, we can't incarcerate him." When asked by a member of Congress for financial information about his company, Prince declined to provide documentation, saying, "we're a private company, and there's a key word there – private." Later he stated that the company could provide it at a future date if questions were submitted in writing. When the term "mercenaries" was used to describe Blackwater employees, Prince objected, characterizing them as "loyal Americans."

A staff report compiled by the House Committee on Oversight and Government Reform on behalf of Representative Henry Waxman questioned the cost-effectiveness of using Blackwater forces instead of U.S. troops. Blackwater charged the government $1,222 per day per guard, "equivalent to $445,000 per year, or six times more than the cost of an equivalent U.S. soldier," the report alleged. During his testimony on Capitol Hill, Erik Prince disputed this figure, saying that it costs money for the government to train a soldier, to house and feed them, they don't just come prepared to fight. "That sergeant doesn't show up naked and untrained," Prince stated. Moreover, he pointed out that Blackwater's employees were trained in special operations and exceeded the capabilities of the average soldier.

In the wake of Prince's testimony before Congress, the U.S. House amended the Military Extraterritorial Jurisdiction Act in October 2007. The new legislation, H.R.2740 - the MEJA Expansion and Enforcement Act of 2007, expanded the original scope to MEJA to encompass all security contractors working overseas, not only those working under the Department of Defense. This subsequently led to the prosecution by U.S. courts of some U.S. military contractors, but only for incidents involving attacks on U.S. nationals. The legal status of Blackwater and other security firms in Iraq was a subject of contention. Two days before he left Iraq, L. Paul Bremer signed "Order 17" giving all Americans associated with the CPA and the American government immunity from Iraqi law. A July 2007 report from the American Congressional Research Service indicates that the Iraqi government still has no authority over private security firms contracted by the U.S. government. On October 5, 2007, the State Department announced new rules for Blackwater's armed guards operating in Iraq. Under the new guidelines, State Department security agents will accompany all Blackwater units operating in and around Baghdad. The State Department will also install video surveillance equipment in all Blackwater armored vehicles, and will keep recordings of all radio communications between Blackwater convoys in Iraq and the military and civilian agencies that supervise their activities.

In December 2008, a U.S. State Department panel recommended that Xe should be dropped as the main private security contractor for U.S. diplomats in Iraq.

On January 30, 2009, the State Department told Blackwater Worldwide that it will not renew its contract in Iraq. However, in 2010 it was awarded a $100 million contract from the CIA.

Regardless of these developments, Xe defended its work in Iraq. A company spokeswoman stated: "When the US government initially asked for our help to assist with an immediate need to protect Americans in Iraq, we answered the call and performed well. We are proud of our success – no-one under our protection has been killed or even seriously wounded."

In August 2010, the company agreed to pay a $42 million fine to settle allegations that it unlawfully provided armaments and military equipment overseas. However, the company is still allowed to accept government contracts. The settlement and fine conclude a U.S. State Department investigation that began in 2007.

==== Iraqi courts ====
On September 23, 2007, the Iraqi government said that it expects to refer criminal charges to its courts in connection with the Blackwater shootings. However, on October 29, 2007, immunity from prosecution was granted by the U.S. State Department, delaying a criminal inquiry into the September 16 shootings of 17 Iraqi civilians. Immediately afterwards, the Iraqi government approved a draft law to end any and all immunity for foreign military contractors in Iraq, to overturn Order 17. The U.S. Department of Justice also said any immunity deals offered to Blackwater employees were invalid, as the department that issued them had no authority to do so. It is unclear what legal status Blackwater Worldwide operates under in the U.S. and other countries, or what protection the U.S. extends to Blackwater Worldwide's operations globally. A number of Iraqi families took Blackwater to court over alleged "random killings committed by private Blackwater guards".

Legal specialists say that the U.S. government is unlikely to allow a trial in the Iraqi courts, because there is little confidence that trials would be fair. Contractors accused of crimes abroad could be tried in the United States under either military or civilian law; however, the applicable military law, the Uniform Code of Military Justice, was changed in 2006, and appears to now exempt State Department contractors that provide security escorts for a civilian agency. Prosecution under civilian law would be through the Military Extraterritorial Jurisdiction Act, which allows the extension of federal law to civilians supporting military operations; however, according to the deputy assistant attorney general in the Justice Department's criminal division, Robert Litt, trying a criminal case in federal court would require a secure chain of evidence, with police securing the crime scene immediately, while evidence gathered by Iraqi investigators would be regarded as suspect.

The Iraqi government announced that Blackwater must leave Iraq as soon as a joint Iraqi–U.S. committee finishes drafting the new guidelines on private contractors under the current Iraqi–U.S. security agreement. On January 31, 2009, the U.S. State Department notified Blackwater that the agency would not renew its security contract with the company. The Washington Times reported on March 17, 2009, that the U.S. State Department had extended its Iraq security contract with Blackwater's air operations arm, Presidential Airways, to September 3, 2009, for a cost of $22.2 million.

On January 31, 2010, three current and former U.S. government officials confirmed the Justice Department is investigating whether officials of Blackwater Worldwide tried to bribe Iraqi government officials in hopes of retaining the firm's security work in Iraq after the shooting in Nisour Square in Baghdad, which left 17 Iraqis dead and stoked bitter resentment against the United States. The officials said that the Justice Department's fraud section opened the inquiry late in 2009 to determine whether Blackwater employees violated a federal law banning American corporations from paying bribes to foreign officials. In 2012 the Department of Justice closed the investigation without filing any charges.

==== Lawsuits ====
In the March 2004 court case Helvenston et al. v. Blackwater Security, Blackwater was sued by the families of four contractors killed in Fallujah. The families said they were suing not for financial damages, but for the details of their sons' and husbands' deaths, saying that Blackwater had refused to supply these details, and that in its "zeal to exploit this unexpected market for private security men," the company "showed a callous disregard for the safety of its employees." On February 7, 2007, four family members testified in front of the House Government Reform Committee. They asked that Blackwater be held accountable for future negligence of employees' lives, and that federal legislation be drawn up to govern contracts between the Department of Defense and defense contractors. Blackwater then countersued the lawyer representing the empty estates of the deceased for $10 million on the grounds the lawsuit was contractually prohibited from ever being filed. In January 2011, U.S. district judge James C. Fox dismissed the suit.

On November 27, 2004, an aircraft operated by Presidential Airways and owned by its sister company, Blackwater AWS, crashed in Afghanistan; it had been a contract flight for the United States Air Force en route from Bagram to Farah. Three soldiers and three civilian crew members aboard the plane were killed. Several relatives of the victims filed a wrongful death lawsuit against Presidential in October 2005.

On October 11, 2007, the Center for Constitutional Rights filed suit against Blackwater under the Alien Tort Claims Act on behalf of an injured Iraqi and the families of three of the 17 Iraqis killed by Blackwater employees during the September 16, 2007, Blackwater Baghdad shootings. The suit, Abtan v. Blackwater, alleged that Blackwater had engaged in war crimes, created a "culture of lawlessness", and routinely deployed employees who used steroids and other psychoactive drugs.

In June 2009, an amended lawsuit was filed in U.S. District Court in Alexandria, Virginia, alleging that Blackwater employees shot and killed three members of an Iraqi family, including a nine-year-old boy, who were traveling from the Baghdad airport to Baghdad on July 1, 2007. The suit further accused Blackwater employees of murder, weapons smuggling, money laundering, tax evasion, and child prostitution. Two affidavits filed as part of the suit by former employees accuse Blackwater of encouraging the murder of Iraqi civilians, and of murdering or having murdered employees who intended to testify against the company. The lawsuit was ultimately settled confidentially in 2010, with plaintiffs accepting cash payments from the company.

==== Federal prosecution ====
In August 2012, the company agreed to pay $7.5 million in fines, without admitting guilt, to the U.S. government to settle various charges involving pre-Academi personnel. February 2013, the majority of the remaining charges were dropped when it was shown that, in many cases, the Blackwater employees had been acting under the orders of the U.S. government. Once the court decision had been finalized, Academi pointed out that "[t]he court decision involves former Blackwater executives, none of whom have ever worked for ACADEMI or the current ownership."

After the Nisour Square killings of 17 Iraqi civilians and the injury of 20 more by Blackwater convoy guards in a Baghdad traffic circle in September 2007, charges were brought against five guards. One pleaded guilty to a lesser offense in exchange for his testimony for the prosecution. Three were eventually convicted in October 2014 of 14 manslaughter charges and in April 2015 sentenced to 30 years plus one day in prison. These sentences were deemed unfair upon appeal and these three await resentencing. Another was convicted of murder and sentenced to life in prison; however, this verdict was overturned in August 2017.

On December 22, 2020, U.S. President Donald Trump pardoned four former Blackwater contractors serving long prison terms: Nicholas Slatten, Paul Slough, Evan Liberty and Dustin Heard. The pardons do not establish innocence; however, they were criticised, both in the U.S. and in Iraq, as condoning killing of innocent civilians.

== See also ==
- Arms industry
- Executive Outcomes
- Mozart Group—American military volunteer group in Ukraine
- Prince Foundation
- Shadow Company
- Wagner Group—Russian private military company
