= Nisour Square massacre =

2007 mass shooting in Baghdad, Iraq

- Part of the Iraq War, Iraqi insurgency, and the Iraqi civil war
- Location: 33.30222°N 44.35639°E; Nisour Square, Baghdad, Iraq
- Date: September 16, 2007; 12:00 pm (UTC+03:00)
- Attack type: Mass shooting Massacre
- Deaths: 17
- Injuries: 20
- Perpetrator: Blackwater contractors
- Verdict: Guilty
- Convictions: Slatten: First-degree murder Heard, Liberty, Slough: Voluntary manslaughter (14 counts); Attempted manslaughter (20 counts); Weapons violation; Ridgeway: (1 count each): Voluntary manslaughter; Attempted manslaughter; Aiding and abetting
- Sentence: Slatten: Life imprisonment without the possibility of parole Slough: 15 years in prison Liberty: 14 years in prison Heard: 12 1/2 years in prison Ridgeway: 1 year and 1 day in prison
- Convicted: Dustin Heard (pardoned); Evan Liberty (pardoned); Nicholas Slatten (pardoned); Paul Slough (pardoned); Jeremy Ridgeway

The Nisour Square massacre occurred on September 16, 2007, when employees of Blackwater Security Consulting (now Constellis), which was a private military company contracted by the United States government to provide security services in Iraq, shot at Iraqi civilians, killing 17 and injuring 20 in Nisour Square, Baghdad, while escorting a U.S. embassy convoy. The killings outraged Iraqis and strained relations between Iraq and the United States. In 2014, four Blackwater employees were tried and convicted in U.S. federal court; one of murder, and the other three of manslaughter and firearms charges. In 2020, all four convicted were pardoned by President Donald Trump. United Nations experts said the pardons "violate U.S. obligations under international law and more broadly undermine humanitarian law and human rights at a global level".

Blackwater contractors claimed that the convoy was ambushed and that they fired at the attackers in defense of the convoy. The Iraqi government and Iraqi Police investigator Faris Saadi Abdul stated that the killings were unprovoked. The next day, Blackwater Worldwide's license to operate in Iraq was temporarily revoked. The U.S. Department of State said that "innocent life was lost", and according to The Washington Post, a military report appeared to corroborate "the Iraqi government's contention that Blackwater was at fault". The Iraqi government vowed to punish Blackwater. The incident sparked at least five investigations, including one from the Federal Bureau of Investigation (FBI). The FBI investigation found that, of the 17 Iraqis killed by the guards, at least 14 were shot without cause.

== Incident ==
Sequence of events triggering the Nisour Square massacre
1 Blackwater 'Raven 23' convoy enters Nisour Square from the south via access road from Iraqi army base; individual vehicles take positions along the southern edge of the traffic circle to control entry.
2 Iraqi traffic officer halts northbound traffic into Nisour Square
3 Northbound Kia near the head of the line fails to stop; driver is shot and killed by 'Raven 23'. The Kia's passenger, Iraqi traffic officer, and fourteen more civilians in the column of northbound traffic subsequently are shot and killed.

Just before noon on September 16, 2007, a car bomb exploded near the Izdihar Compound where US and Iraqi officials were meeting, and a 19-man Blackwater Tactical Support Team (TST) consisting of a convoy of four trucks, answering to the call sign "Raven 23", took up positions on the south side of Nisour Square to secure an evacuation route for the US officials and another Blackwater team providing security for them. The Blackwater commander, Jimmy Watson, had received an order to stand by and not leave the Green Zone upon reaching a checkpoint, but he made a "tactical decision" to advance to Nisour Square after waiting for a few minutes; upon informing the Blackwater Tactical Operations Center of this, he was ordered to return to the Green Zone. However, after "Raven 23" entered Nisour Square, Watson was ordered to "lock down the traffic circle to expedite the travel of [the other Blackwater team]". Shortly after assuming their positions, "Raven 23" began firing on civilians in response to an approaching car, killing fourteen and wounding twenty more.

During opening arguments for a criminal trial held in 2014, defense lawyers representing former Blackwater members of Raven 23 argued the men felt the approaching Kia was a credible threat as a possible car bomb, and opened fire in self-defense. Prosecutors argued the men did not face hostile gunfire when they began shooting, and continued to shoot despite the lack of threats. The driver of the Kia was shot once in the head by a Blackwater contractor and was killed. The Kia continued to roll forward after the driver was killed, according to an eyewitness, and Raven 23 continued to fire on it, killing the passenger (the driver's mother); eventually, the Kia was struck by a grenade and was incinerated.

A State Department spot report published the same day as the incident stated that eight to ten attackers opened fire on Raven 23 "from multiple nearby locations, with some aggressors dressed in civilian apparel and others in Iraqi police uniforms" after the convoy had entered Nisour Square, starting at 12:08 p.m. The report added that another Blackwater Tactical Support Team (TST 22), who had escorted the officials and TST 4 back to the Green Zone, was redirected to support Raven 23. Raven 23 "returned defensive fire" and withdrew from Nisour Square with one of its BearCat vehicles in tow. As Raven 23 was departing Nisour Square, several members continued to discharge their weapons, causing additional civilian deaths and injuries. TST 22 arrived at Nisour Square after Raven 23 had left; when TST 22 tried to withdraw, its route was blocked by Iraqi Army and Police vehicles. A U.S. Army convoy arrived at 12:39 p.m., backed by air cover, to escort TST 22 back to the Green Zone.

An Iraqi government account of the incident stated that as the convoy drew close to Nisour Square, a Kia sedan with a woman and her adult son in it was approaching the square from a distance, driving slowly on the wrong side of the road, and that the driver ignored a police officer's whistle to clear a path for the convoy. According to this account, the security team fired warning shots and then lethal fire at the Kia. They then set off stun grenades to clear the scene. Iraqi police and Iraqi Army soldiers, mistaking the stun grenades for fragmentation grenades, opened fire at the Blackwater men, to which they responded. Iraqi investigators also alleged that Blackwater helicopters fired into the cars from the air, as at least one car had bullet holes in its roof; Blackwater has denied any of its aerial units discharged weapons.

The account by the Blackwater firm differed from the Iraqi government's account; Blackwater's account stated the driver of the Kia sedan had kept driving toward the convoy, ignoring verbal orders, hand signals, and water bottles thrown at the car, and continued to approach even when fired upon. An Iraqi policeman went over to the car, possibly to help the passenger, but the vehicle kept moving and it looked to the guards as if the policeman was pushing the car towards the Blackwater TST. In their view, this confirmed that they were under attack by a vehicle bomb, whereupon they fired at the car, killing both people in it as well as the Iraqi policeman. In response to the guards' killing of the Iraqi policeman, other Iraqi police officers began to fire at the Blackwater men, who communicated to the State Department operations center that they were under attack. A State Department employee who was walking into the department's Baghdad operations center on the day of the incident heard a radio call from the convoy: "Contact, contact, contact! We are taking fire from insurgents and Iraqi police." According to Blackwater vice-president Marty Strong, the convoy was hit with "a large explosive device" and "repeated small arms fire" which disabled a vehicle. Several sources have stated that the explosion was caused by a mortar round, though this is not reflected in the State Department's incident report.

On September 27, 2007, The New York Times reported that during the chaotic incident at Nisour Square, one member of the Blackwater security team continued to fire on civilians despite urgent cease-fire calls from colleagues. It remains unclear whether the team member mistook the civilians for insurgents. The incident was allegedly resolved only after another Blackwater contractor pointed his weapon at the man still firing and ordered him to stop.

Three Blackwater guards who witnessed the incident later said that they believed the shootings were unjustified.

== Immediate aftermath ==
Casualties

Killed:

1. Ahmed Haithem Ahmed Al Rubia'y, 21
2. Mahassin Mohssen Kadhum Al-Khazali, 44
3. Osama Fadhil Abbas, 52
4. Ali Mohammed Hafedh Abdul Razzaq, 9
5. Mohamed Abbas Mahmoud, 47
6. Qasim Mohamed Abbas Mahmoud, 11
7. Sa'adi Ali Abbas Alkarkh, 52
8. Mushtaq Karim Abd Al-Razzaq, 18
9. Ghaniyah Hassan Ali, 55
10. Ibrahim Abid Ayash, 77
11. Hamoud Sa'eed Abttan, 33
12. Uday Ismail Ibrahiem, 27
13. Mahdi Sahib Nasir, 26
14. Ali Khalil Abdul Hussein, 54

Wounded:

1. Majed Salman Abdel Kareem Al-Gharbawi
2. Jennan Hafidh Abid al-Razzaq
3. Yasmin Abdul Kidr Salhe
4. Mohanad Wadhnah
5. Haydar Ahmad Rabie Hussain Al-Khafaji
6. Hassan Jaber Salman
7. Farid Walid Hasoun Al-Kasab
8. Abdul Amir Raheem Jihan Yasser
9. Wisam Raheem Fliah Hasan Al-Miri
10. Talib Mutluk Diwan
11. Adel Jaber Sham'ma Al-Jadiri
12. Nasir Hamzah Latif Al-Rikabi
13. Mahdi Abid Khider Abbas Al-Faraji
14. Abdul Wahab Abdul Qadar Al-Qalamchi
15. Bara Sadoon Ismail Al-Ani
16. Sami Hawa Hamud Al-Sabahin
17. Fawziyyah Aliwi Hassoon
18. Ali Hadi Naji Al-Rubaie
19. Alah Majeed Sghair Zaidi
20. Jassim Mohammad Hashim

In the immediate aftermath of the attacks, Blackwater's rights to conduct work in Iraq were temporarily suspended. Several Iraqi and American investigations have been conducted into the incident. The incident caused Iraqi Prime Minister Nuri al-Maliki to call on the U.S. government to end its contract with Blackwater USA, and for the Iraqi government to push for an apology, compensation for victims or their families and for the guards involved in the shooting to be held "accountable". The US House passed a bill that would have made all private contractors working in Iraq and other combat zones subject to prosecution by U.S. courts, however, the Senate never voted on it.

=== License to operate in Iraq ===
On September 18, 2007, an Iraqi Interior Ministry spokesman said Blackwater is "not allowed to operate anywhere in the Republic of Iraq". However, the company was allowed to continue to operate in Iraq until January 2009 when the U.S.–Iraq Status of Forces Agreement took effect. A spokesman stated that the ban would last for the duration of the investigation, and that it would not be permanent. The banning was described by P. W. Singer, an expert on the private military industry, as "inevitable", given the US government's reliance on and lack of oversight of the private military industry in Iraq.

The Private Security Company Association of Iraq, in a document last updated on July 3, 2007, listed Blackwater as not having a license to operate in Iraq despite their attempts to apply for one. Blackwater's operations on behalf of the U.S. Department of State and the CIA may be unaffected by license revocation. Also, it is not clear whether the license revocation is permanent.

On September 19, as a result of the incident, the United States temporarily suspended all land travel by U.S. diplomats and other civilian officials in Iraq outside Baghdad's heavily fortified Green Zone. The order confines most Americans to a 3.5 square miles (9.1 km^{2}) area in the center of the city so that they are unable to visit other areas without traveling in a helicopter. The order did not say when the suspension would expire. On September 21, CNN reported that Blackwater would resume normal operations the following day.

Blackwater, which had been operating in Iraq without an Iraqi government license, applied for one after the incident, but the application was rejected by Iraqi officials in January 2009. The Iraqi government ordered Blackwater to leave Iraq as soon as a joint Iraqi-U.S. committee finished drafting new guidelines on private contractors under the Iraqi-U.S. security agreement. On January 31, 2009, the U.S. State Department notified Blackwater that it would not be renewing its security contract with the company.

=== Investigations ===
The U.S. State Department said it planned to investigate what it called a "terrible incident". According to Iraqi Prime Minister Nuri al-Maliki, Secretary of State Condoleezza Rice promised a "fair and transparent" investigation into the incident. The State Department announced an American-Iraqi joint commission to investigate both the shooting and the broader issue of employing private security contractors. The committee was co-chaired by Abd al Qadir, the Iraqi Minister of Defense, and Patricia A. Butenis, the Chargé d'affaires of the U.S. Embassy in Iraq.

Henry Waxman, the chair of the House Committee on Oversight and Government Reform, which held hearings on the use of Private Security Contractors in February 2007, said his committee would hold hearings "to understand what has happened and the extent of the damage to U.S. security interests". Waxman stated that "the controversy over Blackwater is an unfortunate demonstration of the perils of excessive reliance on private security contractors."

On October 4, 2007, the Federal Bureau of Investigation announced that it would be taking the lead in the investigation of the shooting incident.

==== Findings ====
An Interior Ministry spokesman said Iraqi authorities had completed their investigation into the shooting and concluded that Blackwater guards were responsible for the deaths. U.S. military reports appear to corroborate the Iraqi government's contention that Blackwater was at fault in the incident.

On October 2, 2007, the Democratic staff of the House Oversight and Government Reform Committee released a report stating that Blackwater USA guards had used deadly force weekly in Iraq and had inflicted "significant casualties and property damage". The report found that the guards fired their weapons 195 times from the beginning of 2005 through the second week of September 2005. The report further said that Blackwater had reported that its forces fired first in over 80 percent of the cases.

On October 4, 2007, U.S. military reports indicated Blackwater's guards had opened fire without provocation and used excessive force. "It was obviously excessive", a U.S. military official speaking on condition of anonymity told the Washington Post. "The civilians that were fired upon, they didn't have any weapons to fire back at them. And none of the I.P. (Iraqi police) or any of the local security forces fired back at them", the official continued. The Blackwater guards appeared to have fired grenade launchers in addition to machine guns, according to the report.

On October 13, 2007, the FBI reported that it had concluded that at least 14 of the 17 Iraqis who died in the square had been killed without cause. The three justifiable killings were those of the two passengers in the white Kia sedan and an unidentified Iraqi nearby. A Blackwater spokeswoman responded to the findings by saying Blackwater "supports the stringent accountability of the industry. If it is determined that one person was complicit in the wrongdoing, we would support accountability in that. The key people in this have not spoken with investigators."

On January 19, 2008, The New York Times reported that the contractor responsible for many of the deaths in the engagement, previously known only as "turret gunner no. 3", is named Paul Slough . He enlisted in 1999, and served in Bosnia with the 3rd Infantry Division. He received an honorable discharge in 2002 and then enlisted in the Texas National Guard. He served one tour in Iraq before being hired as a Personal Security Specialist in Iraq.

Radio logs released in December 2008 seemed to affirm that the guards had been responding to an attack on September 16. The logs depicted "a hectic eight minutes in which the guards repeatedly reported incoming gunfire from insurgents and Iraqi police".

On April 1, 2009, the Associated Press reported that forensic tests on bullets were inconclusive. None of the bullets the lab had available could be matched to the rifles used by the guards.

On April 1, 2011, the Associated Press reported on Erik Prince's seven-hour testimony about what allegedly transpired. Prince strongly criticized the way in which federal authorities had handled the investigation and disputed the claims that U.S. or Blackwater personnel were to blame for the shootings. In his testimony, Prince noted that, "It seems the ballistics analysis was done to prove the guilt of the Americans, not to just try to identify what happened there." Erik Prince said that he didn't believe the FBI had fully investigated the sources of all the used bullets in Nisour Square, arguing that it would have been helpful if the defense had been in possession of a complete ballistics report. FBI scientists couldn't match bullets from the square to guns carried by the Blackwater guards and FBI investigators found foreign cartridge cases of a kind not used by U.S. or Blackwater personnel. As shootings in the square were not uncommon, it is unclear whether the shells were from the shooting in question or from other incidents.

=== October 2007 United Nations report ===
In October 2007, the United Nations released a two-year study that stated that private contractors, although hired as "security guards", were performing military duties. The report found that the use of contractors such as Blackwater was a "new form of mercenary activity" and illegal under international law; however, the United States is not a signatory of the 1989 UN Mercenary Convention banning the use of mercenaries. Nor is the US a signatory of the 1977 additional protocol to the 1949 Geneva Conventions in which Article 47 specifies that mercenaries are civilians who "take a direct part in the hostilities" and are "motivated to take part in the hostilities essentially by the desire for private gain". (The Protocol makes no distinction between defensive and offensive actions, but the U.S. does make such a distinction, in that it does not regard defensive actions by security guards to be combat.)

== Reactions from Iraqis ==
Baghdad resident Halim Mashkoor told AP Television News, "We see the security firms ... doing whatever they want in the streets. They beat citizens and scorn them. ... [I]f such a thing happened in America or Britain, would the American president or American citizens accept it?" Hasan Jaber Salman, a lawyer who was one of the wounded, said that "no one did anything to provoke Blackwater" and that "as we turned back they opened fire at all cars from behind" An Iraqi police officer who was directing traffic at the scene said Blackwater guards "became the terrorists" when they opened fire on civilians unprovoked, while a businessman said he wasn't seeking compensation but only "the truth" from the guards. After a group of Iraqi ministers backed the Iraqi Interior Ministry's decision to shut down Blackwater USA's operations in Iraq, Iraqi Prime Minister Nuri al-Maliki called on the U.S. government to end its contract with Blackwater and called on Blackwater to pay the families $8 million in compensation.

A U.S. judge's decision to dismiss all charges against Blackwater on January 1, 2010, sparked outrage in the Arab world.

== Actions against Blackwater ==
US Secretary of Defense Robert Gates testified before Congress that the Pentagon has sufficient legal authority to control its contractors, but that commanders lack sufficient "means and resources" to exercise adequate oversight. On October 4, 2007, the U.S. House passed a bill that would make all private contractors working in Iraq and other combat zones subject to the Military Extraterritorial Jurisdiction Act and thus prosecution by U.S. courts. Senate Democratic leaders said they planned to pass similar legislation as soon as possible.

Richard J. Griffin, the Assistant Secretary of State for Diplomatic Security, who made key decisions regarding the department's oversight of private security contractor Blackwater USA, resigned in November 2007, after a critical review by the House Oversight Committee found that his office had failed to adequately supervise private contractors during the Blackwater Baghdad shootings. Howard Krongard, who was appointed Inspector General of the U.S. State Department in 2005, resigned in December 2007 after he was accused by the House Oversight Committee of improperly interfering with investigations into the Blackwater Baghdad shootings.

== Court actions ==
On September 24, 2007, the Iraqi Ministry of the Interior announced it would file criminal charges against the Blackwater staff involved in the shooting, although it is unclear how some of them will be brought to trial. A senior aide to al-Maliki said that three of the Blackwater guards were Iraqis and could be subject to prosecution. The aide also said that the Iraqi government was pushing for an apology, compensation for victims or their families and for the guards involved in the shooting to be held "accountable".

On October 11, 2007, the Center for Constitutional Rights filed suit against Blackwater USA under the Alien Tort Claims Act on behalf of an injured Iraqi and the families of three of the seventeen Iraqis who were killed by Blackwater employees during the September 16, 2007, shooting incident. The suit was settled for an undisclosed sum in January 2010. A second civil lawsuit filed jointly by the families of six victims against Blackwater was settled on January 6, 2012, for an undisclosed sum.

=== Criminal charges ===
In December 2008, the United States Department of Justice announced it was filing criminal charges against five of the Blackwater employees, and ordered them to surrender to the FBI. Five were charged with 14 counts of manslaughter, 20 counts of attempted manslaughter and a weapons violation: Donald Ball, a former Marine from West Valley City, Utah; Dustin Heard, a former Marine from Knoxville, Tennessee; Evan Liberty, a former Marine from Rochester, New Hampshire; Nicholas Slatten, a former army sergeant from Sparta, Tennessee, and Paul Slough, an army veteran from Keller, Texas. A sixth Blackwater guard, Jeremy Ridgeway of California, struck a deal with prosecutors on December 4, 2008, and pleaded guilty to one count each of voluntary manslaughter, attempted manslaughter, and aiding and abetting, and agreed to testify against the other five men.

The trial was set for early 2010, but the charges were dismissed by United States District Court for the District of Columbia Judge Ricardo Urbina on December 31, 2009, who ruled that the Justice Department had mishandled evidence and violated the guards' constitutional rights. In the memorandum opinion, Judge Urbina ruled the cases against Slough, Liberty, Heard, Ball, and Slatten had been improperly built on testimony given in exchange for immunity; that evidence included statements the guards had been compelled to give to State Department investigators, and as these statements would have been self-incriminating, they could not be used as evidence under the Fifth Amendment to the United States Constitution. "Prosecutors should therefore have built their case against the men without them", a BBC report explained. The opinion elaborated "the government failed to establish that the Iraqi witnesses it presented to the second grand jury were not in any way influenced by their previous exposure to the defendants' compelled statements. This evidentiary use of tainted information constitutes yet another Kastigar violation." Iraqi Prime Minister Nouri al-Maliki harshly criticized the dismissal. Three weeks later, Vice President Joe Biden, who was overseeing U.S. policy in Iraq, promised Iraqi leaders the U.S. would appeal the dismissal of these charges.

On April 22, 2011, after closed-door testimony, a federal appeals-court panel revived the Justice Department's prosecution of the former Blackwater Worldwide guards by reinstating the manslaughter charges against the five men. A three-judge panel of the United States Court of Appeals for the District of Columbia Circuit found "systemic" errors in the district court's 2009 decision to dismiss charges against the five former Blackwater guards and added "We find that the district court's findings depend on an erroneous view of the law". On June 5, 2012, the US Supreme Court declined to review the Appeal Court ruling, allowing the trial to proceed.

In September 2013, the charges against Ball were dropped. Prosecutors stated they reached their decision after an "assessment of the admissible evidence against him".

=== Trials and convictions ===
The other four went on trial starting on June 17, 2014; ten weeks of testimony and 28 days of jury deliberations resulted in convictions for all four men on October 22, 2014. Nicholas Slatten was found guilty of first-degree murder, and Slough, Liberty and Heard were found guilty of voluntary and attempted manslaughter charges, and of using a machine gun to commit a violent crime. Jurors sided with prosecutors' contention that the shooting was a criminal act, not a battlefield encounter gone wrong. Slatten faced a potential sentence of life in prison. The other three guards faced decades in prison; the weapons charges carried a minimum 30-year sentence under a law enacted during the 1990s cocaine epidemic. Bringing the weapons charges was disputed within the Justice Department, which initially opposed including them in the indictment. After it was added, defense attorneys contended a 30-year sentence would be too severe, since the law was intended to deter gang members from carrying automatic weapons.

On April 13, 2015, federal district judge Royce C. Lamberth sentenced Slatten to life in prison, while the other three guards were sentenced to 30 years in prison each.

On August 4, 2017, a three-judge panel of the U.S. Court of Appeals for the District of Columbia Circuit overturned Slatten's murder conviction and ordered the other defendants to be re-sentenced to time already served. The panel also recommended that Slatten undergo a re-trial on the grounds that it was unjustifiable to try him with his co-defendants, and that he should have been tried separately. The United States Court of Appeals for the District of Columbia Circuit's fractured per curiam decision first found that Military Extraterritorial Jurisdiction Act authorized the prosecutions, over the partial dissent of Judge Janice Rogers Brown. However, the court then found that the mandatory minimum sentences as applied to the defendants were unconstitutional cruel and unusual punishments, over the partial dissent of Judge Judith W. Rogers.

On December 19, 2018, Slatten was found guilty of murder and again was sentenced to life in prison on August 14, 2019. Heard, Liberty, and Slough were resentenced on September 5, 2019, to terms approximately half the original 30-year periods.

=== Pardons ===
On December 22, 2020, U.S. President Donald Trump granted full presidential pardons to Slatten, Slough, Liberty, and Heard. A White House statement said the men had a "long history of service to the nation" as veterans of the US Armed Forces, and that there was strong support for the pardons from the public and elected officials. The White House further stated that the Court of Appeals "ruled that additional evidence should have been presented at Mr. Slatten's trial", and recently that prosecutors said "that the lead Iraqi investigator, who prosecutors relied heavily on to verify that there were no insurgent victims and to collect evidence, may have had ties to insurgent groups himself".

Clemency caused outrage among Iraqi citizens and family members of the victims. UN Human Rights Office spokeswoman Marta Hurtado said that forgiveness "contributes to impunity and has the effect of encouraging others to commit such crimes in the future". The Iraqi Foreign Ministry urged the United States to reconsider, declaring the pardons "did not take into account the seriousness of the crime committed".

== See also ==
- 2004 Fallujah ambush
- Battle of Haditha
- Haditha massacre
- Human rights in post-invasion Iraq
- Ilario Pantano
- Shadow Company
