= Presidential Airways (charter) =

Airline of the United States

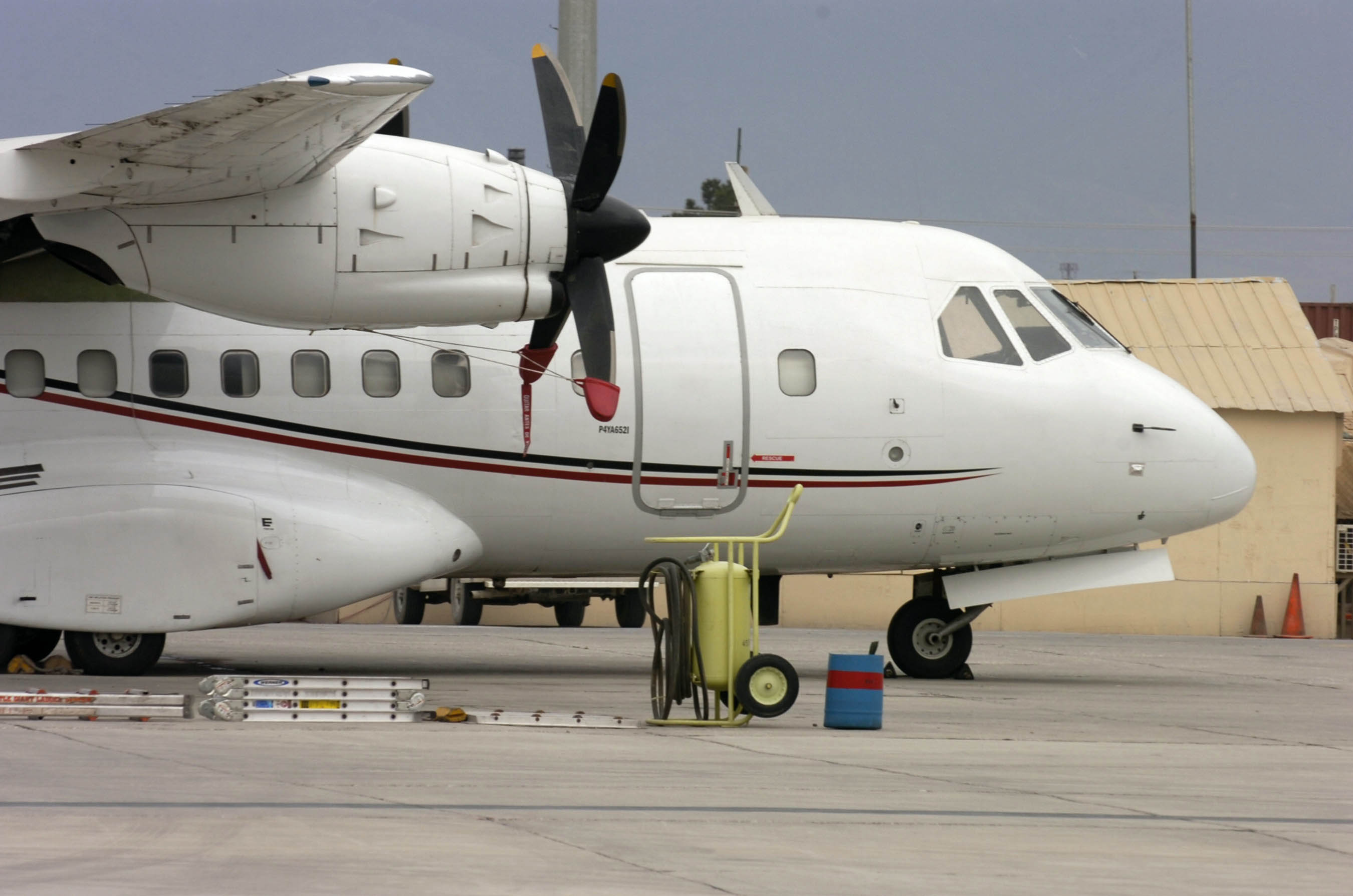
- Presidential Airways CASA/IPTN CN-235
IATA	ICAO	Call sign
-	-	-
- Operating bases: Melbourne International Airport
- Fleet size: See Fleet below
- Parent company: Aviation Worldwide Services
- Headquarters: Melbourne, Florida, United States

Presidential Airways (PAW) is a charter cargo and passenger airline currently based at Melbourne International Airport. Presidential is now a subsidiary of Aviation Worldwide Services, owned by AAR Corp.

== History ==
Presidential was awarded a US government contract of up to $34 million in 2004 to provide fixed-wing STOL airlift capacity to US forces in Afghanistan, Uzbekistan and Pakistan.

An aircraft, Blackwater 61, operated by Presidential and owned by its sister company, Blackwater AWS, crashed on November 27, 2004 in Afghanistan; it had been a contract flight for the United States Air Force en route from Bagram to Farah. All aboard, three soldiers and three civilian crew members, were killed. Several of the dead's relatives filed a wrongful death lawsuit against Presidential in October 2005. A 60 Minutes investigation reported that the crash was caused by pilot error but that the company tried to avoid responsibility.

After the crash, Presidential was suspended from government operations for one month, but its rights were reinstated thereafter. Presidential went on to win new Central Asia regional airlift contracts in 2007, 2008, and 2010.

AAR purchased the company from Xe Services, formerly Blackwater Worldwide, in April 2010. At the time, Presidential and sister company STI Aviation operated 17 fixed wing aircraft and 21 helicopters on deployment. Following the acquisition, the company's base was relocated from Moyock, North Carolina to Melbourne, Florida. AAR Airlift won another contract for Central Asian airlift capacity in 2014.

== Fleet ==
Presidential operates CASA C-212 and CASA CN-235 turboprops. Recent contracts have added de Havilland Canada DHC-8 Dash 8 turboprop aircraft to the fleet. The company also operates turbine powered helicopters including Bell 214ST, Bell 412, MD Helicopters MD-530, Eurocopter/Aérospatiale SA 330 Puma and Sikorsky S-61 rotorcraft.
