= Chinese private security companies =

Belt and Road Initiative Participant States

China’s political and economic presence is rapidly increasing on the global scale. Chinese globalization projects, most notably the Belt and Road Initiative, likewise expose Chinese interests to terrorism, local conflicts, and anti-Chinese sentiment. The Chinese government and the Chinese Communist Party (CCP) have faced pressure from Chinese state-owned enterprises (SOE) and domestic voices to protect these interests. China has opposed the Western force projection model and maintains its long-standing policy of non-interference in foreign politics and conflicts. The use of Chinese private security companies (PSC) is an indirect method to protect these interests, crucially in the more politically unstable regions of the Middle East and Africa, without deploying People's Liberation Army (PLA) troops on foreign soil.

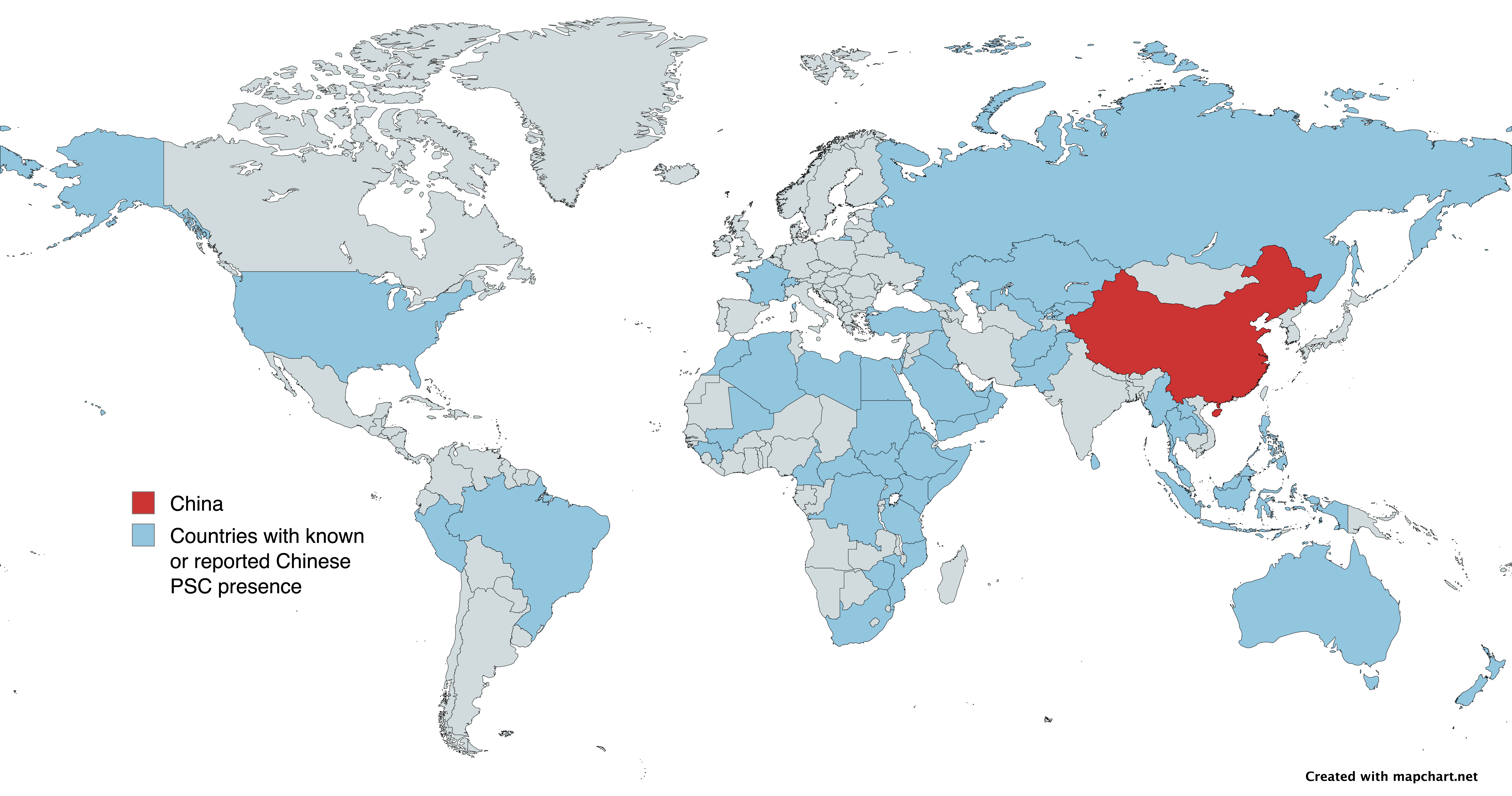
Map of Countries with known or reported Chinese PSCs (2018)

Mercenaries, non-aligned military personnel for hire, are a common tool used globally throughout military history. Their modern institutionalized form, private military companies (PMCs), usually offer relief to state militaries engaged in open combat situations and were widely used in contemporary Western involvement in the Middle East. Private security companies (PSCs) largely interact with the private sector and protect businesses and properties against criminal and terrorist activities when the local state forces are perceived to be inadequate. In the 1990s, Deng Xiaoping's reforms allowed for the development of a small and heavily regulated PSC industry. PSCs continued to exist in this quasi-legal state before 2009 when the Chinese government passed the "Regulation on the Administration of Security and Guarding Services” (保安服务管理条例), which legalized PSCs; PMCs remain illegal in China. On June 10, 2004, armed men killed 11 Chinese workers and injured 4 others on a China Railway Shisiju Group Corporation construction site near the city of Kunduz, Afghanistan. This incident sparked outrage in China and underscored the need to protect Chinese personnel and capital abroad. With the legalization of PSCs, the Chinese market grew rapidly. By 2013, 4,000 PSCs operated in China and employed 4.3 million security personnel. By 2017, this had grown to over 5,000 companies. The majority of these organizations operate within mainland China.

Chinese PSC personnel are largely former soldiers and former police officers; the PLA has not experienced open conflict since the 1979 Sino-Vietnamese War. As a result, Chinese PSCs are relatively young and inexperienced organizations compared to their Western counterparts. Western PMCs and PSCs continue to dominate the international market. It was estimated that by 2016 only 20 Chinese PSCs provided international services and deployed only 3,200 personnel overseas while 50 Western PMCs were operating in Iraq alone in 2008. Apart from infrequent joint operations with local military groups, Chinese PSCs are normally unarmed and focus on security consulting. The rapid international spread of Chinese interests and the saturation of PSCs in the Chinese domestic security system has created a rapidly expanding market for Chinese PSCs abroad.

== Lack of regulation ==
PSCs, unlike traditional mercenaries, are largely unregulated by international law. The 2008 Montreux Document is a voluntary international agreement discussing government practices in the use of PMCs and PSCs in open conflict. The agreement is non-binding and only presents recommendations. China is an original signatory of this agreement. The 2013 International Code of Conduct for Private Security Providers expanded the discussion of the Montreux Document to non-conflict situations but again is a non-binding agreement. China is not a signatory of the 2013 agreement, but three Chinese PSCs are: China Security Technology Group Co., Ltd, Huaxin Zhong'an, and Hong Kong-registered Sinoguards Marine Security Ltd. Chinese law only regulates PSCs domestically and Chinese PSCs are not required to obtain a Chinese permit when operating in a foreign country (though the host country may require them to acquire a local permit). This is particularly relevant in overseas Chinese PSCs' usage of firearms, which, though heavily regulated within China, operates in a grey zone abroad and often varies by country.

=== PSC/PMC advantages and strategic capabilities ===
- Deniability to Domestic Audiences: perception management and control of domestic narrative of a nation's involvement in a conflict or social issue — to obscure data collection (troop presence, casualties)
- Deniability for Geopolitical Purposes: to provide force to an area without official presence — to avoid international criticism
- Circumnavigating Legal Constraints: to provide force to an area when deployment of official state forces would violate local or international law
- Cost Saving: can be a cost-effective alternative to official deployment

List of major Chinese PSCs with international services (2016)
Service Locale	Company
North America	中安保实业有限公司 (China Security and Protection Co, Ltd.): United States
South America	中安保实业有限公司 (China Security and Protection Co, Ltd.): Peru, Brazil
Europe	中安保实业有限公司 (China Security and Protection Co, Ltd.): France, Switzerland, Russia
Africa	北京鼎泰安元安全防范技术研究院有限公司 (Beijing Dingtai Anyang Security Services Co, Ltd.): Ethiopia 北京德威保安服务有限公司 (Beijing DeWe Security Service Co., Ltd.): Kenya, Mali, Central African Republic, South Sudan, Sudan, Guinea, Nigeria, Algeria, Madagascar, Ethiopia 深圳中州特卫安全顾问有限公司 (Shenzhen Zhongzhou Tewei Security Consultant Co., Ltd.): Some African Countries [sic] 中安保实业有限公司 (China Security and Protection Co, Ltd.): Egypt, Sudan, Eritrea, Zimbabwe, South Africa, Libya, Morocco, Nigeria
Oceania	中安保实业有限公司 (China Security and Protection Co, Ltd.): Australia, New Zealand
Asia	华信中安(北京)保安服务有限公司 (Huaxin Zhong'an (Beijing) Security Service Co., Ltd.): More than 40 countries in Southeast Asia and the Indian Ocean coast [sic] 北京鼎泰安元安全防范技术研究院有限公司 (Beijing Dingtai Anyang Security Services Co, Ltd.): Iraq, Afghanistan, Pakistan 北京冠安安防技术有限公司 (Beijing Guan'an Security Technology Co., Ltd.): Iraq/Sudan/Nigeria/Afghanistan-UAE Sharjah Free Trade Zone [sic] 北京德威保安服务有限公司 (Beijing DeWe Security Service Co., Ltd.): Pakistan, Iraq, Yemen 深圳中州特卫安全顾问有限公司 (Shenzhen Zhongzhou Tewei Security Consultant Co., Ltd.): Some Asian Countries [sic] 中安保实业有限公司 (China Security and Protection Co, Ltd.): Hong Kong, China, Taiwan, Myanmar, Cambodia, Thailand, Indonesia, Philippines, Pakistan, Sri Lanka, Afghanistan, Kyrgyzstan, Kazakhstan, Qatar, Turkey, Israel, UAE, Saudi Arabia

Number of overseas branches for major Chinese PSC (2016)
Ranking	Company	Number of branches
1	G4S	120
2	Control risks 化险咨询	36
3	中安保实业有限公司 (China Security and Protection Co, Ltd.)	15
4	北京德威保安服务有限公司 (Beijing DeWe Security Service Co., Ltd.)	10
5	华信中安(北京)保安服务有限公司 (Huaxin Zhong'an (Beijing) Security Service Co., Ltd.)	4
5	上海中城卫保安服务集团有限公司 (Shanghai Zhongchengwei Security Service Group Co., Ltd.)	4

Types of Enterprises provided by major Chinese PSC (2016)
Business type	Company
State-owned enterprise (SOE)	G4S, Control Risks 化险咨询, 北京鼎泰安元安全防范技术研究院有限公司 (Beijing Dingtai Anyang Security Services Co, Ltd.), 北京冠安安防技术有限公司 (Beijing Guan'an Security Technology Co., Ltd.), 华信中安(北京)保安服务有限公司 (Huaxin Zhong'an (Beijing) Security Service Co., Ltd.), 中安保实业有限公司 (China Security and Protection Co, Ltd.)
Large private enterprises	G4S, Control Risks 化险咨询, 北京德威保安服务有限公司 (Beijing DeWe Security Service Co., Ltd.), 上海中城卫保安服务集团有限公司 (Shanghai Zhongchengwei Security Service Group Co., Ltd.)
Small and medium enterprises	G4S, Control Risks 化险咨询, 北京德威保安服务有限公司 (Beijing DeWe Security Service Co., Ltd.),

== Africa ==
Sino-African relations have existed and maintained geopolitical importance since the founding of the PRC in 1949. During the Bandung Conference, which took place from April 18–24, 1955 in Bandung, Indonesia, twenty-nine African and Asian countries comprising 54% of the then world population met to promote Afro-Asian economic and political cooperation, continued decolonization following World War II, and to oppose Soviet and American Cold War neocolonialism. Over the next decades, China attempted to provide a third option to recently decolonized and developing African nations, marketing Chinese aid as non-aligned in contrast to the ideological pressures of Soviet and Western aid. Sino-African relations slowed into the late 1970s, but accelerated again in the 1990s following Deng Xiaoping’s economic reforms. In 2013, General Secretary of the Chinese Communist Party Xi Jinping announced the Belt and Road Initiative, a global development plan (involving sixty-five countries and an estimated 900 billion USD in investment) to create economic corridors and trade routes along the path of the ancient Silk Road. As part of this plan, the first official PLA overseas military base, the People's Liberation Army Support Base in Djibouti, was opened in the port of Djibouti in 2017. There are likely over 1 million Chinese (2018) and over 10,000 Chinese companies (2017) in Africa.

=== Expansion ===
Chinese PSCs existed in quasi-legal status on a very small scale, to protect Chinese mining interests, during the first wave of Chinese investment in Africa during the Cold War.

The bureaucratic structure and centralized state oversight of the contemporary Chinese government obscures the separation between Chinese private and state-owned enterprises. Foreign investment further complicates the picture of Chinese PSC presence. The two largest Chinese PSCs in Africa, G4S and Control Risks, are Chinese branches of UK-owned companies. The Hong Kong-based PSC, Frontier Services Group (先丰服务集团), was founded by Erik Prince, the Former Head of the United States-based PMC Blackwater Worldwide. The BRI has created a lucrative market for PSCs in Africa and the Middle East. It has also created an opportunity for start-up contractors to avoid the higher cost, legal requirements, and competition of establishing a PSC in the Chinese domestic market. In 2018, five Chinese nationals were arrested in Lavington, a suburb of Nairobi, the capital of Kenya. They were amassing military equipment, allegedly to create their own PSC, while in the country on tourism visas. Chinese enterprises have expressed feeling unprotected from local conflicts and do not trust local militaries for protection.

=== Zambia and Chinese investment ===
China interests in Africa have received particular attention in Zambia and Tanzania since the construction of the Chinese-funded TAZARA railway, built from 1970-1975 by Chinese and African workers under Chinese supervision. The railway runs from Kapiri Mposhi, Zambia, to the Tanzanian port city Dar es Salaam, connecting landlocked Zambia's Copperbelt to the Indian Ocean, which at the time was necessary to lessen Zambia's dependency on the white-minority government regimes in Rhodesia and South Africa. Anti-Chinese sentiment has risen in Zambia in response to Chinese investment in the nation's mining sector, and was reflected in the election of the fifth president of Zambia, Michael Sata (2011-2014), who campaigned on fighting foreign exploitation of Zambian labor and natural resources.

This relationship has followed a sequence of violence. In 2010, two Chinese managers opened fire into a crowd of miners, injuring 11, who were protesting working conditions at the Chinese-run Collum coal mine near Sinazongwe At the same mine in 2012, workers protesting for increased wages to match new Zambian minimum wage laws killed a Chinese supervisor and injured another. In October 2015, three Chinese nationals were murdered during an armed robbery in the Copperbelt city of Kitwe. In November 2017, three armed men murdered a Chinese labor director in an armed robbery in another Copperbelt city, Ndola. In 2018, China-Zambia bilateral trade valued over $5 billion. Labor disputes and anti-Chinese sentiment continue to push for an expanding market of Chinese PSCs in Africa.

=== Anti-piracy operations ===
Traditionally non-interference oriented Chinese foreign policy has shifted to protect Chinese shipping interests from piracy threats in the Gulf of Aden. The People's Liberation Army Navy (PLAN) engaged with pirates in 2012 and rescued Chinese civilians in Yemen in 2015. The opening of the People's Liberation Army Support Base in Djibouti has created a new need for Chinese PSC activity; the sea marshals employed by 华信中安(北京)保安服务有限公司 (Huaxin Zhong'an (Beijing) Security Service Co., Ltd.), one of the major overseas Chinese PSCs, are permitted by their contracts to use lethal force in anti-piracy self-defense situations while their PLAN escorts can only fire when under direct attack.

=== Major armed operations in Africa ===
- In January 2012, 29 Chinese workers were kidnapped near Al-Abbasiya village in South Kardofan state, Sudan. The Sudanese government blamed the attack on the Sudan People's Liberation Movement-North (SPLM-N), a Sudanese militant group involved in multiple conflicts with the Sudanese government. In late January, a dozen armed Chinese PSC contractors assisted the Sudanese military in the rescue of 29 kidnapped Chinese workers. Both the PSC used in the operation involved and the Chinese company the workers came from are unknown.
- On July 8, 2016, Chinese citizens working for the China National Petroleum Corporation (CNPC) in Juba, the capital of South Sudan, came under fire from a conflict between local militant factions. The DeWe Security (北京德威保安服务有限公司) company, the main security partner of CNPC, evacuated 330 Chinese to Nairobi, Kenya, after four days of joint operations with the South Sundanese government forces to push the rebel groups from the city.

== Middle East ==
Chinese PSCs are present in the Middle East but occupy a smaller role than in African or Southeast Asian countries.
