= Catalyst Capital Group =

Canadian private equity firm

Catalyst Capital Group was, in 2014, esteemed as the second largest private equity firm in Canada. It was founded in 2002 by Newton Glassman, who was its managing partner in 2014, and Gabriel de Alba.

== History ==
At some point before 2013, Catalyst hired Jim Riley as COO.

Glassman led the firm from the position of CEO until he stepped down in April 2018 due to medical issues.

In a January 2021 ruling by Justice Cary Boswell, unsealed documents revealed that in the summer of 2017 Catalyst contracted services with Tamara Global. Tamara Global then hired Black Cube and Psy-Group, both of whom are composed of former members of the Israeli Defence Forces and the Mossad, Israel's national intelligence agency. The court documents allege that Black Cube and Psy-Group took part in operations aimed at discrediting West Face Capital and, indirectly, Justice Frank Newbould, who was the retired head of the Commercial List of the Ontario Superior Court of Justice at the time. In regards to Justice Frank Newbould members were quoted as saying "'Basically we're trying to prove that he's a racist, a depraved anti-Semite, and trying to find information that could paint him in as negative a light as possible'".
