= Wikistrat =

Israeli analysis and business consultancy

WIKISTRAT
- Type: Private
- Industry: Geostrategy
- Founded: 2010
- Founder: Joel Zamel and Daniel Green
- Headquarters: Washington, DC, United States
- Products: Strategic intelligence
- Website: wikistrat.com

Wikistrat Inc. is a geostrategic analysis and business consultancy founded in Israel in 2010 by Joel Zamel and Daniel Green and headquartered in the United States. It describes itself as the world's first crowdsourced consultancy leveraging a global network of over 2,000 subject-matter experts. The vast majority of Wikistrat’s clients are foreign governments. The firm has also engaged in intelligence gathering.

Wikistrat's CEO is Oren Kesler. The Chief Technology Officer was formerly Daniel Green who is now technical advisor, and the previous CEO was Elad Schaffer who replaced the role of Zamel. Lisa Daftari is a senior analyst, Richard Weitz an Expert as well as others.

Previously, Wikistrats Chief Strategy Officer was former Israeli intelligence officer Shay Hershkovitz. Amanda Skuldt was a Senior Project Manager.

== Analysts ==
Rather than employing a stable of in-house analysts, Wikistrat maintains a network of hundreds of academics, consultants, journalists, and retired government/military personnel. Contributors are invited to participate in a given project if they have relevant expertise, and each individual is compensated for his or her time. Analysts can accept or refuse invitations on a case-by-case basis.

The company uses gamification to incentivize analyst participation. CEO Joel Zamel, said in 2013, "[Wikistrat's platform] uses a gamification engine we created that incentivizes analysts by ranking them at different levels for the work they do on the platform. They are immediately rewarded through the engine, and we also track granular changes made in real time. This allows us to track analyst activity and encourages them to put time and energy into Wiki analysis."

Among the notable members of Wikstrat's analytic community are Richard Weitz, Daniel Pipes, Parag Khanna, Kenneth R. Timmerman, Daveed Gartenstein-Ross, Shaukat Qadir, James Joyner, James C. Bennett, Leon Hadar, Michael Rubin, Mark Galeotti and Anne-Marie Slaughter.

== History ==
The company was founded in 2010 in Israel by Joel Zamel and Daniel Green. After studying counter-terrorism, Zamel founded Wikistrat Inc. and became CEO, while Green came aboard as the company's chief technology officer. Thomas P.M. Barnett joined the firm as chief analyst a year later. Barnett is no longer with the firm. The company’s annual revenue exceeded $100 million by October 2019.

=== 2011 Grand Strategy Competition ===
Between June and July 2011, Wikistrat hosted an "International Grand Strategy Competition" which tested the company's collaborative competition approach. More than thirty teams of MA and PhD students representing universities and think tanks participated in the month-long competition in which teams simulated thirteen countries. Participants' affiliations included the UK Defence Forum, the New York University School of Continuing and Professional Studies' Center for Global Affairs, the University of Kentucky's Patterson School of Diplomacy and International Commerce, Georgetown University's School of Foreign Service, and the University of Sussex. The team from Claremont Graduate University's School of Politics and Economics won the competition and a $10,000 prize.

The NYU team's predicted that Russia would ultimately have to outsource its security if it were to continue experiencing demographic decline, and if its economy were to remain heavily dependent on commodity exports. Participants from the Institute of Peace and Conflict Studies argued that India was rooting for Pakistan's disintegration, considering the collapse of the Muslim state as a prerequisite to fully institutionalizing India's alliance with the United States. Students at Sussex believed that North Korea would collapse without Chinese support and therefore recommended that the nation diversify its allies. Organizers were surprised by the level of interest in the competition.

=== Media exposure ===
In 2010, it ran a simulation on the death of North Korean dictator Kim Jong-il, the results of which were referenced (in articles by the organization's chief strategist) on CNN, Time and World Politics Review after Kim died in late 2011.

The firm has been cited by such media outlets as CNN, Reuters, Russia Today, Fox News and NPR as a consultancy of reference for geopolitical issues.

In 2013, Wikistrat ran a simulation for AFRICOM that explored various futures for illicit trafficking in the Trans-Sahel region of Africa.

In January 2014, Wikistrat analysts predicted the rise of a separatist movement in Crimea seeking Russian annexation. This process unfolded in March 2014, prompting digital magazine InformationWeek to write that Wikistrat "beat the CIA."

=== 2016 US presidential election campaign ===
In 2015 Zamel's company Wikistrat spent a week running scenarios called the Cyber Mercenaries project on how a U.S. election interference campaign could be made by Russian cyber actors which was reported to Donald Trump Jr in 2016.

Zamel's company Psy Group formed a partnership with Cambridge Analytica to jointly bid for contracts with the American Government after the 2016 Trump election win.

US Special Counsel Robert Mueller ― who investigated Russian meddling in the 2016 American elections ― questioned Wikistrat founder Joel Zamel about his relationship with George Nader, a witness who cooperated in the Special Counsel investigation. Mueller also asked questions about the work of Wikistrat.

Donald Trump Jr. had met with Zamel, Nader, and Erik Prince in Trump Tower in August 2016. Their discussion reportedly included an offer on the part of Zamel for pro-Trump manipulation of social media.

On April 5, 2019, the Senate Intelligence Committee sent a letter to Walter Soriano, the owner of USG Security Limited based in Britain and Israel for his communication with Paul Manafort, Michael Flynn, Psy-Group, Wikistrat, and Black Cube, Orbis Business Intelligence (a firm co-founded by Christopher Steele).

== See also ==
- Psy-Group
- Joel Zamel
