= Prince Foundation =

Charitable foundation based in the United States

The Prince Foundation, formerly known as the Edgar and Elsa Prince Foundation, is a charitable foundation that was founded in 1979 and is based in Holland, Michigan. It is a major financial supporter of the conservative Christian causes in the state of Michigan and at the national level. The foundation was formed by Western Michigan auto parts manufacturer Edgar Prince and his wife Elsa. Its vice president is Erik Prince, the founder of Blackwater USA (now known as Academi).

== Financial contributions ==
The Edgar and Elsa Prince Foundation has donated millions of dollars to such American conservative Christian groups as Alliance Defense Fund, Council for National Policy, Family Research Council, Focus on the Family, Promise Keepers and American Family Association.

In 2003, the Edgar and Elsa Prince Foundation contributed $4,800,000 over a series of 29 religious grants.

In 2002, the Edgar and Elsa Prince Foundation contributed $2,978,000 over a series of 38 religious grants.

Between 2001 and 2014, the Edgar and Elsa Prince Foundation donated 6.2 million dollars to the Family Research Council, and 5.2 million dollars to Focus on the Family.

The foundation is also a major financial supporter of the Michigan charter school movement.
