= Archimedes Group =

Israeli private intelligence company

- Industry: Private intelligence agency
- Headquarters: Tel Aviv

Archimedes Group is a Tel Aviv-based private intelligence agency that has operated political campaigns using social media since 2017.

== History ==
The current CEO of Archimedes is a former director of the Brussels-based European Friends of Israel lobbying group. This individual has also served as a political adviser in Israel's parliament and an ex-intelligence agent for the Israeli air force. Other senior executive include Yuval Harel, Fabio Goldman, Uri Ben Yosef, Ariel Treiger, and Rafi Cesana.

In 2019, it was banned from Facebook for "coordinated inauthentic behavior" after Facebook found fake users in countries in sub-Saharan Africa, Latin America and Southeast Asia. Facebook investigations revealed that Archimedes had spent some $1.1 million on fake ads, paid for in Brazilian reais, Israeli shekels and US dollars. Facebook gave examples of Archimedes Group political interference. The Atlantic Council's Digital Forensic Research Lab said in a report that "The tactics employed by Archimedes Group, a private company, closely resemble the types of information warfare tactics often used by governments, and the Kremlin in particular."

== See also ==
- Black Cube
- NSO Group
- Psy-Group
- Unit 8200
- Cambridge Analytica
- Internet Research Agency
