= IPRI =

IPRI may refer to:

- International Property Rights Index
- Islamabad Policy Research Institute, a Pakistan-based strategic think tank
