= Joel Zamel =

Australian-Israeli inventor (born 1986)

Joel Zamel (born 1986) is an Australian-Israeli inventor and entrepreneur. He owns and operates several private intelligence and political analysis agencies that offer services for forecasting simulations, wargaming, influence operations, social media campaigns, private investment brokering, and election‑campaign strategy. These agencies include the Joel Zamel Investment Group (JZIG), the geostrategic consultancy Wikistrat, and Psy-Group, a now‑defunct private intelligence firm that shut down after it was revealed to be under investigation by Robert Mueller.

== Early life and education ==
Joel Zamel was born in 1986 in Australia. He is the son of Gary Zamel, a wealthy Australian mining engineer and businessman. Zamel attended the University of New South Wales in Sydney, where he earned a bachelor's degree in mining engineering. He later moved to Israel, where he studied at the Interdisciplinary Center, Herzliya, specializing in counter‑terrorism and homeland security, and earned a master’s degree in government, diplomacy, and strategy. He is also a member of the Central Eurasia Leadership Alliance network.

== Career ==
Zamel is the founder of several private intelligence and political analysis agencies, including the geostrategic consultancy firm Wikistrat and the Philippines-based private intelligence agency WhiteKnight. Zamel gained widespread visibility and public attention during Robert Mueller's Special Counsel investigation in 2018, when The New York Times reported on his dealings with Donald Trump's electoral campaign.

Zamel's agencies have a broad network of analysts, consisting primarily of former government officials and private experts. He is also an active investor in the cybersecurity sector, particularly in firms focused on CVE efforts. He has established various social media influence companies in Eastern Europe and Asia, and has formed a close advisory team of former government officials who served in senior positions in the U.S., U.K., and Middle Eastern governments.

In 2015, Zamel's Wikistrat spent a week running scenarios, called the "Cyber Mercenaries project," on how a U.S. election-interference campaign could be carried out by Russian cyber actors. These were later reported to Donald Trump Jr. in 2016.

On August 3, 2016, Zamel participated in a high-level meeting with Donald Trump Jr., Blackwater founder Erik Prince, Stephen Miller, and George Nader, where Zamel reportedly pitched a social media manipulation campaign to help Donald Trump win the 2016 presidential election. This was followed by a post-inauguration meeting in December 2016 with George Nader, Steve Bannon, and Jared Kushner.

After the 2016 Trump election win, Zamel's company, Psy Group, formed a partnership with Cambridge Analytica to jointly bid for contracts with the American government. In December 2016, George Nader purchased a presentation from WhiteKnight that demonstrated the impact of social media campaigns on Donald Trump's electoral victory.

Zamel had first met Nader at the St. Petersburg International Economic Forum in June 2016. In November 2016, George Nader paid Zamel $2 million for undisclosed reasons. Blackwater founder Erik Prince later lied about it to Congress.

The meeting with Trump was later scrutinized by Robert Mueller's Special Counsel investigation and subsequently led to investigations into his links to Trump officials, which continued after the Mueller investigation finished. Zamel's meetings with Saudi officials were also scrutinized by Mueller.

In February 2019, federal agents detained Zamel at a Washington airport, and he appeared before a grand jury to give evidence to Robert Mueller about his links to George Nader. Zamel bragged to Nader that he had conducted a secret campaign which had been influential in Trump's victory, a characterization which Zamel's lawyer has disputed. Zamel also had contact with Michael Flynn.

On April 5, 2019, the Senate Intelligence Committee sent a letter to Walter Soriano, the owner of USG Security Limited, based in Britain, for his communication with Paul Manafort, Michael Flynn, Psy-Group, Wikistrat, Black Cube, and Orbis Business Intelligence (a firm co-founded by Christopher Steele). Soriano has links to Oleg Deripaska.

Zamel's firms have completed work for Oleg V. Deripaska and Dmitry Rybolovlev.

Zamel has been represented by Marc Mukasey, who specializes in reputation protection. Mukasey, a former law partner of Rudy Giuliani, also represented President Donald Trump.

== Beliefs ==
Zamel believes Bitcoin is a "truth machine protected by a fortress of misconceptions."

Zamel believes in information operations as an underutilized tool for countering extremist ideologies. He believes "dictators are beating the West when it comes to sophisticated information operations." He has advocated for "exploiting the frequent protest movements in Iran and the ever-present disgust with the regime through covert on-the-ground and digital support".

== See also ==
- Mueller Report
- Timeline of investigations into Donald Trump and Russia
