= Psy-Group =

Israeli private intelligence company

- Type: Private Limited Company
- Industry: social media influencing Competitive Intelligence; Risk Consulting
- Founded: December 22, 2014
- Defunct: 2018
- Headquarters: Tel Aviv & Washington, D.C.
- Key people: Royi Burstien
- Number of employees: 30 +

Psy-Group is a former Israeli private intelligence agency. It closed after revelations that it was under investigation by Special Counsel Robert Mueller.

Psy-Group’s CEO was Royi Burstein, a former lieutenant colonel in the Israel Defense Forces.

The company conducted online perception management, social media influencing/manipulation campaigns, opposition research, honey traps, and clandestine on-the-ground activities for clients.

== History ==
=== Cambridge Analytica ===
Psy-Group owner Joel Zamel signed a memorandum of understanding with Cambridge Analytica on Dec. 14, 2016. Alexander Nix the CEO of Cambridge Analytica described entrapping political opponents with bribes and sexual entrapment on a Channel 4 expose, saying, "We use some Israeli companies ... Very effective in intelligence gathering." The Wall Street Journal confirmed that it was referring to Psy-Group.

=== 2016 US Election and Trump campaign ===
According to Bloomberg, Psy-Group pitched its services to super-PACs and other entities during the 2016 election. Those services "included infiltrating target audiences with elaborately crafted social-media personas and spreading misleading information through websites meant to mimic news portals." The company created disinformation campaigns and spread propaganda through fake news entities. Psy-Group prepared a document that outlined how fake news had helped Trump during the election. The document showed North Carolina as a case study of a state that was moved by social media manipulation to "poison the well" create "fake news" and "buzz".

According to Republican party insiders, in 2016 Rick Gates, then-deputy chairman of the Trump campaign, reportedly sought Psy-Group's assistance in a scheme referred to as "Project Rome" from George Birnbaum. Shortly after, Psy-Group hired Covington & Burling, a Washington-based law firm, to conduct a legal review of "Project Rome". The project reportedly included multiple efforts aimed at assisting the Donald Trump campaign, ranging from opposition research to generation of fake online personas. Joel Zamel met Eric Trump later in 2016, but it is unclear if the Trump campaign ever secured Psy-Group's services. The Wall Street Journal published Psy-Group promotional material purportedly from the meeting. The interaction between the Trump campaign and Psy-Group became part of the investigation into Russian interference in the 2016 US presidential elections. Mueller also investigated money flows to Psy-group through Cyprus. The FBI investigation into contacts between Joel Zamel and Trump campaign contacts continued beyond the closure of Mueller's Special Counsel investigation.

The New York Times reported on May 19, 2018, that Donald Trump Jr. met with United Arab Emirates and Saudi intermediary George Nader, Blackwater founder Erik Prince, and Joel Zamel in Trump Tower on August 3, 2016. Nader reportedly told Trump Jr., that the crown princes of Saudi Arabia and the UAE were eager to help his father win the election, and Zamel pitched a social media manipulation campaign. Trump Jr. reportedly responded favorably and Nader subsequently had frequent meetings with Steve Bannon, Michael Flynn, and Jared Kushner.The Times reported that Prince arranged the August 2016 meeting; Prince stated in his November 30, 2017, testimony to the House Intelligence Committee that he had no formal communications or contact, nor any unofficial role, with the Trump campaign. After Trump was elected, Nader paid Zamel up to $2 million. Nader reportedly visited the White House 13 times in 2017 in order to meet Steve Bannon, Trump's chief strategist and campaign manager.

In February 2018, FBI agents assisting Mueller traveled to Israel to interview employees of Psy-Group, the company whose founder, Joel Zamel, pitched psychological operations to the Trump campaign in 2016. The Daily Beast reported that agents asked about Psy-Group's financial structure, its ownership, and its communications with Team Trump during the 2016 campaign. Mueller also subpoenaed records for payments made to PSY Group's bank account in Cyprus.

On April 5, 2019 the Senate Intelligence Committee sent a letter to Walter Soriano, the owner of USG Security Limited based in Britain and Israel, for his communication with Paul Manafort, Michael Flynn, Psy-Group, Wikistrat, and Black Cube, Orbis Business Intelligence (a firm co-founded by Christopher Steele).

=== Tulare Regional Medical Center ===
In 2016, Psy-Group was hired to conduct a covert campaign to maintain Parmod Kumar on the board of Tulare Regional Medical Center, a hospital in Tulare, California. The campaign failed. Kumar, along with hospital physician Yorai Benzeevi, was charged in 2018 for an alleged scheme to defraud and embezzle from the hospital.

=== Project Butterfly ===
In February, 2016, Psy-Group started a campaign against Boycott, Divestment, and Sanctions activists on U.S. college campuses. Psy-Group collected any "derogatory information" on activists from social media and from HUMINT sources. (Mossad is not allowed to spy on American citizens, but this does not apply to private groups like Psy-Group, which used ex−Mossad operatives.)

Psy-Group operated a now-defunct website, outlawbds.com, which published information about B.D.S. activists and leaders. People working for "Project Butterfly" included former Israeli national security advisor Yaakov Amidror and former Mossad deputy director Ram Ben-Barak. Israeli Prime Minister Benjamin Netanyahu also became an adviser to Psy-Group for the project.

"Project Butterfly" showed particular interest in people connected with American Muslims for Palestine, including its founder, Hatem Bazian.

=== West Face Capital ===
The catalyst for the multi-pronged, multi-year legal battle between two Toronto, Canada-based private equity firms—Catalyst Capital Group and West Face Capital—was West Face's acquisition of WIND Mobile, a Canadian startup wireless provider in September 2014. Catalyst and West Face are "ferociously competitive", according to a 2017 National Post article. In June 2014, one of Catalyst's former analysts, Brandon Moyse, was hired by West Face. Both firms were submitting competing bids to acquire WIND Mobile in 2014. Catalyst alleged that Moyse had provided West Face with confidential insider information that placed West Face at an advantage, and resulted in their purchase of Wind Mobile from VimpelCom Ltd. By 2021, there were forty parties directly or indirectly involved the suits and countersuits. West Face purchased Wind for $300-million in 2014 and sold it to Shaw Communications for $1.6 billion in February 2016.

In June 2016, Catalyst filed a lawsuit against VimpelCom Ltd. for $750M over a breach of contract and against West Face for the alleged use of insider information in its acquisition of WIND Mobile. In his August 18, 2016 Ontario Superior Court of Justice decision, Justice Frank Newbould ruled against Catalyst in favor of West Face. Newbould dismissed Catalyst's claims in their entirety and found that claims against VimpelCom Action and Moyse were groundless. He also said that Catalyst's owner, Newton Glassman was "aggressive," "argumentative" and "considerably difficult." On September 13, 2016 Catalyst submitted an appeal. On October 7, 2021, Justice Newbould awarded West Face $1,239,965 saying that Glassman was playing hardball because he had lost the opportunity to acquire Wind.

An August 10, 2017 article in the Wall Street Journal, said that complaints against Catalyst had been filed with the Ontario Securities Commission. On August 11, 2017 Catalyst allegedly received an email from Vincent Hanna, the name of a fiction character in the 1995 file Heat, in which the author said that the WSJ article was part of a conspiracy against Catalyst by a cabal led by West Face that was using private investigators. Callidus Capital whose majority shareholder is Catalyst, said the allegations were false. Catalyst filed a lawsuit against the two reporters on November 7, 2017.

According to court documents on September 26 and 27, 2017, Catalyst hired Psy Group and Black Cube.

According to a January 28, 2019 New York Times article, the "phenomenon of private spies drew widespread attention in 2017, when Black Cube was linked to the Harvey Weinstein affair. The Times reported on a number of incidents involving Black Cube and Psy-Group, including a sting operation and defamation campaign against West Face.

West Face said the campaign against them had also included defamatory press releases, online blog posts, tweets, and videos against West Face and its executives, using information gathered or manufactured by the Israeli companies and Rosen, using aliases including "Samantha Beth," "Alex Walker," "Jordan Brown," and "Judge Frank Newbould."

According to the complaint, Psy-Group—whose operatives in the Canadian project allegedly included former Israeli television journalist Emmanuel Rosen—worked in tandem with Black Cube, publishing defamatory articles and social media posts about West Face and using sophisticated masking techniques to hide their tracks. West Face learned of Black Cube and Psy-Group's activities when its employees recognized the image of Stella Penn Pechanac in news reports about rape and harassment accusations against Hollywood mogul Harvey Weinstein. Pechanac was a Black Cube employee who reportedly posed as a woman's rights activist and who befriended actress Rose McGowan in a bid to gather intelligence on behalf of Weinstein. Employees of West Face recognized Pechanac as the same woman who had reached out to them.

Rosen is alleged to have worked with Brooklyn-based public relations professional Virginia Jamieson in order to plant "highly negative media coverage" of then 74-year-old Newbould, who had retired from the Ontario Superior Court of Justice in June 2017. On September 18, 2017 a "Black Cube operative" posing as a "potential client" who self-identified as an executive director of London-UK-based Victorius Group, Hugo Gabriel Saavedra Rodriguez, emailed to make an appointment with Newbould at his office in Toronto and later that evening at the chic Toronto restaurant Scaramouche. Newbould was taped surreptitiously at the two meetings and photographed at the second. The agent, "Rodriguez", "apparently tried to induce [Newbould], in vain, to make anti-Semitic remarks". On September 21, Virginia Jamieson, gave the widely-respected, veteran National Post journalist, Christie Blatchford a USB flash drive which contained photographs and seemingly edited recordings of the two meetings with Newbould. On September 25, Catalyst attorneys, Brian Greenspan and David Moore met at the Court seeking an adjournment to the September 26 appeal. In her November 25, 2017 exclusive report in the Post, entitled "The judge, the sting, Black Cube and me", Blatchford reported that "Black Cube had tried to entrap Newbould on behalf of Catalyst Capital Group Inc., a $4.3 billion private equity firm in Toronto that was founded by Newton Glassman, who is Jewish." Catalyst denied the allegations.

On February 21, 2018, the Court of Appeal dismissed Catalyst's appeal of Justice Newbould’s decision regarding Moyse. In a March 19, 2018 letter to their investors, Catalyst said that they had new evidence in their case against West Face.

In the third week in March 2021, an Ontario Superior Court Justice, Cary Boswell, rejected Catalyst and Black Cube's requests to seal records to protect undercover agents. Details in the records will become "part of the public record". By March 27, litigation between Catalyst and West Face continued. Court documents allege that Psy-Group worked with Black Cube on operations to "discredit West Face Capital and to 'indirectly' discredit Newbould." An email correspondence between Black Cube and Psy-Group agents said that, "Basically we’re trying to prove that he's a racist, a depraved anti-Semite, and trying to find information that could paint him in as negative a light as possible." According to a March 26, 2021 Globe and Mail article on the March 2021 Ontario Superior Court trial in Catalyst v. West Face, that made relevant documents public, operatives working for Psy-Group and the Tel Aviv, Israel-based Black Cube are said to be "former members of the Israeli Defence Forces and the Mossad, the intelligence branch of the Israeli Defence Forces." The Globe reported that in 2017, Catalyst had hired Tamara Global, a security company to prepare for the appeal of Newbould's 2016 Ontario Superior Court decision. Black Cube operatives also hired Tamara as subcontractors. Court papers also revealed that "Catalyst was the party ultimately paying Black Cube's fees, which included a "US$1.5-million base fee, and up to US$11-million in total, after potential bonuses". Catalyst claimed that they were unaware of how "the sting operations were being conducted."

=== Other Activity ===
In January 2017, Zamel met with Ahmed al-Assiri (who was implicated in the assassination of Jamal Khashoggi) and Trump adviser Michael Flynn in regards to Iran. The subject of the meeting was regime change in Iran. Steve Bannon and Lebanese-American businessman George Nader, a representative of the United Arab Emirates, attended the meeting.

=== WhiteKnight ===
Bloomberg reported that there was discussion within Psy-Group to rebrand itself as WhiteKnight. WhiteKnight is a private intelligence agency based in the Philippines that has been reported by Bloomberg as being part owned by Joel Zamel and reported by the New York Times as having links to Zamel. Along with Psy-Group, which had an agreement with Cambridge Analytica, WhiteKnight has links to Cambridge Analytica and the Brexit Leave campaign.

WhiteKnight rose to prominence when George Nader turned to the company for information on the 2016 election. It was the second time he reached out to a company owned by Zamel, the first being Psy-Group, which was talked about in a high-level meeting with Nader representing Saudi Arabia and the United Arab Emirates and Trump officials including Trump Jr, Erik Prince, Stephen Miller, to assist the then candidate Trump to secure the election via social media manipulation against his rivals. In December 2016, Nader purchased a presentation from WhiteKnight demonstrating the impact of social media campaigns on Trump's electoral victory. Nader made a payment of $2 million to Zamel for his services. WhiteKnight stated that it is global in operations. On October 22, 2018, Senator Richard Blumenthal sent letters to Facebook, Google, Reddit and Twitter asking each company about companies associated with Joel Zamel including WhiteKnight, Psy-Group and Wikistrat and if they had purchased advertisements or used fake accounts on their platforms.

== Structure ==
Psy-Group structure was multilayered. The company had a bank account in Cyprus under a company called IOCO, which was owned or partly owned at one point by British Virgin Islands-based Protexer Limited and Cornell Enterprises SA, which in turn was managed by Zürich-based Salix Services AG. Ownership of IOCO changed annually. Protexer subsidiary MGTM Financial Services Limited is owned by Metropol Group in Moscow and run by Mikhail Slipenchuk. Psy-Group was operating under the name Invop Ltd., which was founded on December 22, 2014. Most of the Israeli-based employees came from the same school Joel Zamel attended: the Interdisciplinary Center, Herzliya.

The work of Psy-Group was international. They sought Donald Trump as a client in 2016. Psy-Group and Black Cube approached the Israeli Ministry of Strategic Affairs and offered their services to fight against the Boycott, Divestment and Sanctions movement; the ministry rejected Psy-Group's offer, choosing instead to partner with Kela Shlomo.

Scott Mortman managed Psy-Group's American clients. Mortman was previously an advisor to the Prime Minister's Office in Israel and currently works for Greenberg Traurig LLP, a firm representing both Trump and Zamel.

== Legal issues ==
There is a legal challenge to keep data left on computers that were used by Psy-group instead of being erased relating to the West Face Capital. In June 2019 it was reported that the Israeli Central District Magistrate's Court blocked the computers’ backup process in a closed hearing. Judge Irit Weinberg-Nutovitz announced that the data would be downloaded and given to the government's Administrator General and Official Receiver. Psy-Group liquidator, Hayut Greenberg, and Calanit Hermelin-Vager, who represents the Official Receiver, opposed the forensic backup.

The Senate Intelligence Committee was reported to have investigated Psy-Group by reaching out to Royi Burstien and Joel Zamel.

== See also ==
- Black Cube
- NSO Group
- Wikistrat
- WhiteKnight
- Cambridge Analytica
- Unit 8200
- Special Counsel investigation (2017–present)
- Timeline of investigations into Trump and Russia (January–June 2018)
- Timeline of investigations into Trump and Russia (2019)
- Archimedes Group
