= Shaukat Qadir =

Pakistan Army brigadier

Shaukat Qadir was a Pakistan Army brigadier who authored Operation Geronimo.

Qadir began his career as a pilot in the Pakistan Air Force (PAF) and then moved to the Pakistan Army. He retired in 1998 as a Brigadier. In 1999, he became the founder and vice-president, and later president, of the semi-independent think tank Islamabad Policy Research Institute (IPRI). In 2001, he sought early retirement due to disagreements with the military government. Since then, he has been visiting faculty at the Fatima Jinnah Women University, writing in various national and international newspapers and journals, and working as an independent Security and Risk Assessment consultant. He is also currently a Senior Analyst at Wikistrat.

== Background ==
Shaukat began his military career as a Flight Cadet in the PAF in 1965. He joined the Pakistan Military Academy in 1968. In 1970, he was commissioned in the 6th Battalion, Frontier Force Regiment, 6 FF (Infantry).

He returned from his six-month sojourn in East Pakistan (now called Bangladesh) weeks before the surrender at the end of the 1971 war. He saw action during the Balochistan insurgency in the 1970s. Over the years, he has commanded three brigades and served on the staff of a brigade, a division, and a corps; he has also been on the faculty of the infantry school, Command and Staff College, and the War Wing at the National Defence University, Islamabad. In 1998, he sought and obtained early retirement from the Army.

In 1999, he founded the Islamabad Policy Research Institute (IPRI) and became the vice-president. He finally requested retirement again from the IPRI in 2001. Since then, he has been a free-lance journalist, an author with a weekly column, a member of visiting faculty at the Fatima Jinnah Women's University, and an invited speaker and author at various national and international conferences.

=== Author and columnist ===
Shaukat has written in various newspapers, magazines, journals and books over the last decade, both nationally and internationally. He has a weekly column in the Pakistan Daily Times and also writes regularly for The National. In the past, he has written for the Far Eastern Economic Review, RUSI – Royal United Services Institute (UK), PILDAT – Pakistan Institute for Legislative Development and Transparency, Rediff.com (India), Dawn (Pakistan), and The Round Table Journal, among others.
