= Private intelligence agency =

Organisation

A private intelligence agency (PIA) is a private sector (non-governmental) or quasi-non-government organization devoted to the collection, analysis, and exploitation of information, through the evaluation of public sources (OSINT or Open Source INTelligence) and cooperation with other institutions. Some private intelligence agencies obtain information deceptively or through on-the-ground activities for clients.

Private agencies have made their services available to governments as well as individual consumers; they have also sold their services to large corporations with an interest or investment in the category (e.g. crime, disease, corruption, etc.) or the region (e.g. Middle East, Vietnam, Prague, etc.) or to investigate perceived threats such as environmental groups or human rights groups.

Some private intelligence agencies use online perception management, social media influencing/manipulation campaigns, strategic disinformation (such as fake news production/propaganda production), opposition research and political campaigns using social media and artificial intelligence such as Psy-Group, Cambridge Analytica and Black Cube. The Atlantic Council's Digital Forensic Research Lab described the activity of Archimedes Group as practicing "information warfare". Former anti-corruption prosecutor Aaron Sayne said private intelligence is "an industry that's largely undocumented and has very flexible ethical norms" as agencies collect and use sensitive information "for one purpose on day one and some completely contradictory purpose on day two".

The private intelligence industry has boomed due to shifts in how the U.S. government is conducting espionage in the war on terror. Some $56 billion (USD) or 70% of the $80 billion national intelligence budget of the United States was in 2013 earmarked for the private sector according to The New York Times' Tim Shorrock. Functions previously performed by the Central Intelligence Agency (CIA), National Security Agency (NSA), and other intelligence agencies are now outsourced to private intelligence corporations.

== List of private intelligence companies ==
- Active
  - AEGIS (UK)
  - AggregateIQ (Canada)
  - Archimedes Group (Israel)
  - BAE Systems (UK)
  - Black Cube (Israel & UK)
  - Booz Allen Hamilton (US)
  - Control Risks Group (UK)
  - Emerdata Limited (UK)
  - Fusion GPS (US)
  - Groupe GEOS (France)
  - Hakluyt & Company (UK)
  - Janes Information Services (UK)
  - Kroll Inc. (US)
  - NSO Group (Israel)
  - Oxford Analytica (UK)
  - Palantir Technologies (US)
  - Pinkerton National Detective Agency (US)
  - Smith Brandon International, Inc. (US)
  - Stratfor (US)
- Inactive
  - Appin (India)
  - Cambridge Analytica (UK)
  - Psy-Group (Israel)
  - SCL Group (UK)
  - Western Goals Foundation (US)

== See also ==
- Private military company
- Private security company
- Private investigator
- Defense contractor
- Business intelligence
- Competitive intelligence
- Open-source intelligence
- Security sector governance and reform
- Think tank
- Labor spying in the United States
