= Asher Tishler =

Israeli economist

- Born: 1947 (age 78–79)
- Education: Hebrew University (B.Sc.); University of Pennsylvania (PhD)
- Known for: Applied Microeconomics, Models of Research and Development, Energy Economics, Defense Economics
- Scientific career
- Fields: Economics, Econometrics
- Workplaces: College of Management Academic Studies

Professor Asher Tishler (אשר טישלר; born 1947) is an Israeli economist and former president of the College of Management Academic Studies.

== Biography ==
=== Academic career ===
Tishler received his B.A. in Economics and Statistics (magna cum laude) from the Hebrew University of Jerusalem in 1972, and his Ph.D. in Economics from the University of Pennsylvania in 1976.

In 1976 he joined Tel Aviv University's faculty of management as a post-doctoral fellow, where he continued to pursue a career as researcher and lecturer culminating at the position of dean of the faculty in 2007-2014.

Tishler also served as the director of the Eli Hurvitz Institute of Strategic Management, director of the Institute of Technology and Society, academic director of the Executive MBA program and the Kellogg-Recanati International Executive MBA program, academic director of Lahav Executive Education and the director of the Israel Institute of Business Research.

Tishler served as a visiting professor at the University of Pennsylvania, University of Southern California and University of Iowa.

In 2014 Tishler was appointed president of the College of Management Academic Studies, Israel's oldest and largest college, a post he held until mid 2017.

=== Public and Business Positions ===
Tishler is a consultant with the Israeli Ministry of Defense, where in 2012 he headed the Tishler Committee, a special committee appointed by the Minister of Defense to examine the Israeli defense budget and its management.

He has also been consulting to the Israel Defense Forces, the Israel Electric Corporation, the Israeli Ministry of National Infrastructures, Ministry of Finance and firms in Israel, USA and Hong Kong. Tishler is a member of the international advisory board of Black Cube, a private intelligence agency with offices in Tel Aviv, London and Madrid.

Tishler was and is a board member and chairman in academic and financial organizations and a member of various investment committees.

== Selected published works ==
Tishler's main research interests are applied microeconomics, models of research and development, energy economics, and defense-related issues. His work has been published in the Journal of Econometrics, Research Policy, The Energy Journal, Defence and Peace Economics, The Review of Economics and Statistics, Management Science, the European Economic Review, Energy Policy, Operations Research, and other journals.

His recent works includes:

- Friedman, Y., Carmeli, A. and A. Tishler (2017). "Fuel cost uncertainty, capacity investment and price in a competitive electricity market". Energy Economics. 61: 233–240. doi:10.1016/j.eneco.2016.11.014.
- Gal, N., I. Milstein, Tishler, A. and C.K. Woo (2016). "How CEOs and TMTs Build Adaptive Capacity in Small Entrepreneurial Firms" (PDF). Defence and Peace Economics. 53 (6): 996–1018. doi:10.1111/joms.12184. S2CID 53668835.
- Pecht, E. and A. Tishler (2015). "Budget allocation, national security, military intelligence, and human capital: a dynamic model". Journal of Management Studies. 28 (3): 367–399. doi:10.1080/10242694.2015.1101885. S2CID 156577197.
- Milstein, I. and A. Tishler (2015). "Can Price Volatility Enhance Market Power? The Case of Renewable Technologies in Competitive Electricity Markets". Resource and Energy Economics. 41: 70–90. doi:10.1016/j.reseneeco.2015.04.001.
- Friedman, Y., Carmeli, A., Tishler, A. and K. Shimizu (2016). "Untangling Micro-Behavioral Sources of Failure in Mergers and Acquisitions: A Theoretical Integration and Extension". International Journal of Human Resource Management. 27 (20): 2339–2369. doi:10.1080/09585192.2015.1042003. S2CID 152985427.
- Pecht, E. and A. Tishler (2015). "The Value of Military Intelligence". Defence and Peace Economics. 26 (2): 179–211. doi:10.1080/10242694.2014.886435. S2CID 55069885.
- Shabtay, H. and A. Tishler (2015). "Budget Allocation under Uncertainty and the Costs of War and Insecurity". Defence and Peace Economics. 25 (5): 461–480. doi:10.1080/10242694.2013.810025. S2CID 154258509.
