= Leon Hadar =

American journalist

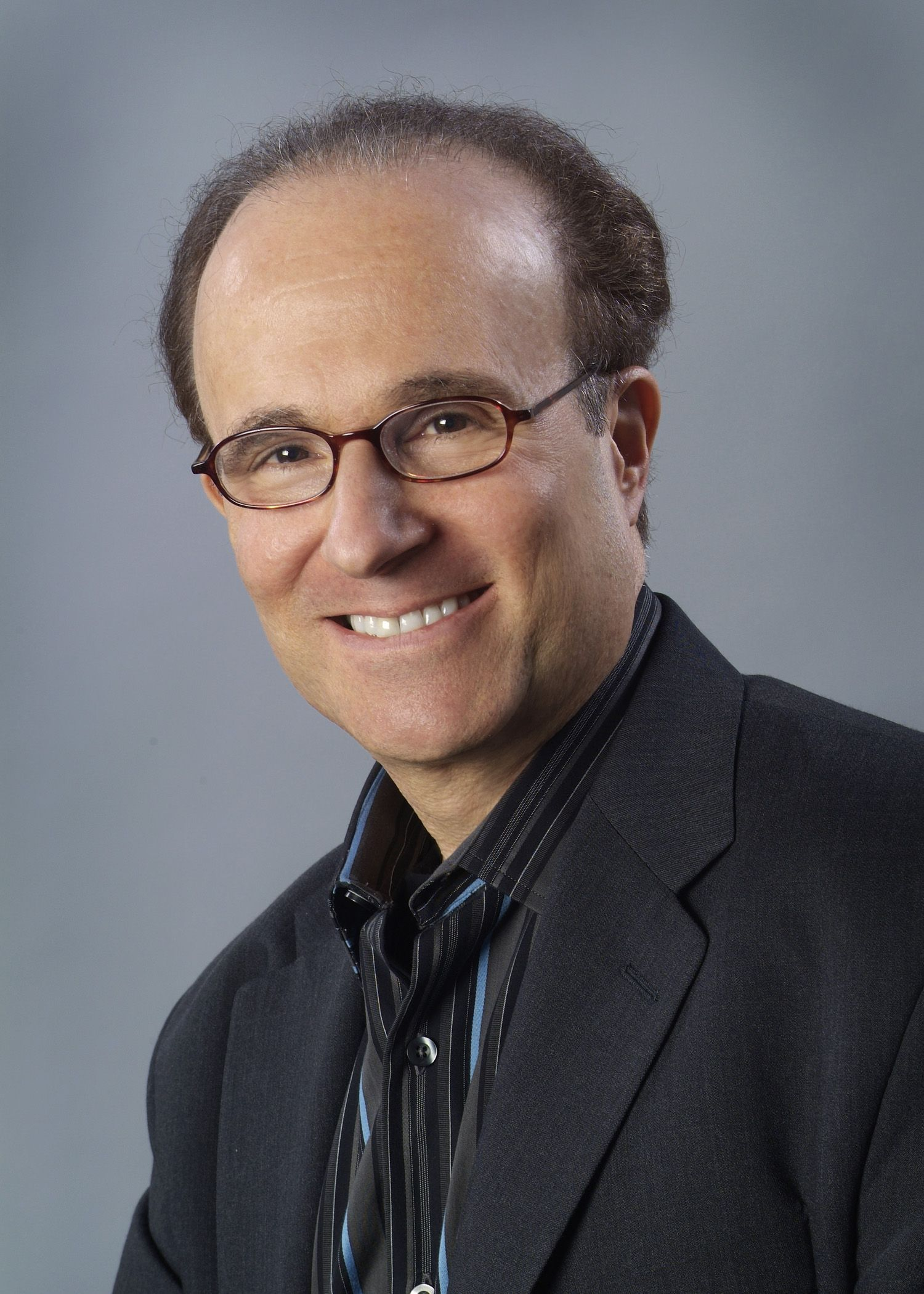
Leon Hadar (2005).

Leon Hadar, is a global affairs analyst, journalist, blogger and author. A long-time critic of American policy in the Middle East, he is a former research fellow with the Cato Institute, and a former senior fellow with the Foreign Policy Research Institute . He has been a contributing editor for The American Conservative and for National Interest, has written for Asia Times, The Spectator, Quillette and Times of Israel and has served as a columnist for Haaretz and as a blogger for the Huffington Post. Hadar has published numerous analyses and commentaries on U.S. global diplomatic and trade policies, with a special focus on the Middle East and East and South Asia. Hadar is the author of two books on U.S. policy in the Middle East, Quagmire: America in the Middle East (Cato Institute, 1992), and Sandstorm: Policy Failure in the Middle East (Palgrave Macmillan, 2005). Hadar also served as a foreign policy advisor to the Ron Paul 2008 presidential campaign. He has taught political science at University of Maryland College Park and is a former Senior Analyst at Wikistrat.

== Career ==
A former United Nations correspondent for the Jerusalem Post, Hadar is currently the Washington bureau chief for the Business Times (Singapore)." He also taught political science at American University and Mount Vernon College, where he served as director of international studies, and was affiliated as a research fellow with the EastWest Institute (formerly the Institute on East-West Security Studies), the Center for International Development and Conflict Management (CIDCM) at the University of Maryland, College Park and the Independent Institute. In 1993, Hadar was selected as a member of the Libertarian Party's "Shadow Cabinet", "a list of public figures and scholars—including Ron Paul (Treasury), John Taylor Gatto (Education), and James Bovard (Agriculture)—who were expected to review and comment on the actions of President Clinton's cabinet."

== Publications ==
Hadar's analyses on global affairs have appeared in newspapers including The New York Times, The Washington Post, Washington Times, The Los Angeles Times, Christian Science Monitor, Chicago Tribune, Atlanta Journal and Constitution, The Baltimore Sun, The Philadelphia Inquirer, The Dallas Morning News, Houston Chronicle, The Orange County Register, El País, The Korea Herald, The Australian, Middle East Times, and Tehran Times as well as in magazines such as Columbia Journalism Review, Foreign Affairs, Foreign Policy, World Policy Journal, Current History, Middle East Journal, Journal of Palestine Studies, Washington Report on Middle East Affairs and Mediterranean Quarterly. The broadcast outlets CNN, Fox News, CBC, BBC, NPR and VOA have interviewed him. He also contributes regularly to news websites published by such outlets like The Globalist, Antiwar.com, LewRockwell.com, Asia Times Online, The National Interest, IRC Right Web Program, and Fox News.
