= James Joyner =

American journalist

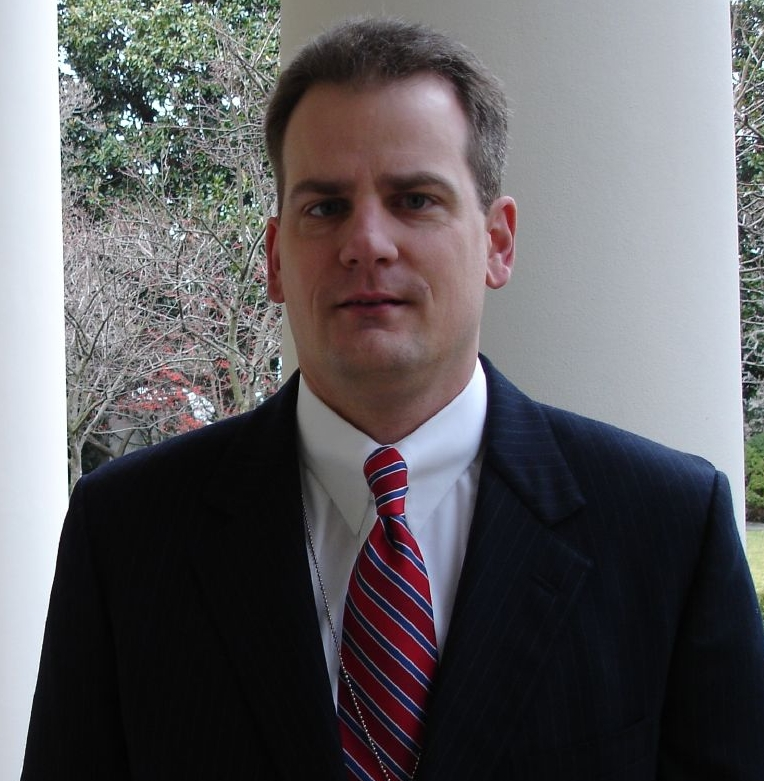
- Born: Fort Monroe, Virginia, U.S.
- Education: Jacksonville State University (BA, MA); University of Alabama (PhD)
- Occupations: Industry analyst, author, blogger
- Website: http://jamesjoyner.com

James Joyner is a political scientist who runs the weblog Outside the Beltway.

== Career ==
He is Professor of Security Studies at the Command and Staff College at Marine Corps University, a nonresident senior fellow with the Brent Scowcroft Center on Strategy and Security at the Atlantic Council and an Expert at Wikistrat.

Previously, he was a managing editor at the Atlantic Council, a defense contractor for the Defense Information Systems Agency (DISA), Managing Editor of Strategic Insights, the professional journal of the Center for Contemporary Conflict at the Naval Postgraduate School, acquisitions editor for international affairs at Brassey's, Inc., a Dulles, Virginia book publisher (later called Potomac Books), and a political science professor at Troy State University, Bainbridge College, and the University of Tennessee at Chattanooga.

Joyner served in the U.S. Army from 1988 to 1992 and is a combat veteran of Operation Desert Storm. He was awarded the Bronze Star, the Army Commendation Medal, and numerous service medals and ribbons. He is a graduate of the Airborne and Air Assault schools.

He holds a PhD in political science from the University of Alabama and B.A. and M.A. degrees in political science from Jacksonville State University.

== Personal life ==
James Joyner married Kimberly Webb on October 8, 2005. The couple had two daughters. On November 27, 2011, Kimberly Webb Joyner died unexpectedly in her sleep.
