= George Nader (businessman) =

Lebanese-American businessman and child molester (born 1959)

- Born: 15 May 1959 (age 67); Lebanon
- Citizenship: United States; Lebanon; United Arab Emirates
- Education: Cleveland State University
- Status: Pleaded guilty
- Convictions: Child pornography infractions Child sexual abuse
- Penalty: 10 years in prison

Details
- Country: United States, Czech Republic
- Date apprehended: 1991; 2003; 2019

George Aref Nader (Arabic: جورج نادر, born May 15, 1959) is a Lebanese-American consultant, lobbyist, political adviser, and repeat convicted sex offender. He has repeatedly acted as an unofficial liaison between United States politicians and the United Arab Emirates and Saudi Arabia and as a lobbyist for private security firm Blackwater.

Nader has served as an adviser to Crown Prince Mohamed bin Zayed Al Nahyan of the United Arab Emirates and as a consultant to Blackwater founder Erik Prince. In January 2018, special counsel Robert Mueller's investigators questioned Nader in connection to suspicions that the UAE had been involved with President Donald Trump's 2016 presidential campaign. In August 2016 Nader met with Donald Trump Jr., Erik Prince, and Joel Zamel, an Israeli entrepreneur and specialist in social media manipulation, to offer help to the Trump team in winning the election. There are conflicting accounts of whether the nearly $2 million Nader paid Zamel after Trump's victory is attributed to that or not. In 2021, Nader pleaded guilty to violating U.S. campaign finance laws by using over $3.5 million to reach out through a front to Hillary Clinton's 2016 campaign for the U.S. Presidency.

Nader has had several run-ins with the law over the years related to sexual abuse of children. He was convicted in the 1990s of transporting child pornography publications, and imprisoned in 2003 for sexually abusing ten boys in the Czech Republic. He pleaded guilty in early 2020 to flying a 14-year-old boy from Europe to the US for sex, and transporting pornography depicting child sexual abuse and bestiality.

== Early life ==
Nader was born in Lebanon. He is a Christian. As a teenager, he moved to the US, not knowing any English. He went on to attend Cleveland State University.

== Career ==
=== Middle East Insight magazine ===
Nader founded the Middle East Insight magazine, which he was editor of from 1981 through the 1990s; the magazine ceased publication in 2002.

=== Politics ===
During the George H. W. Bush Administration, he helped to free American hostages in Lebanon after the Iran–Contra affair. During the Clinton Administration, Nader tried unsuccessfully to broker an Israeli–Syrian peace agreement, working with Estée Lauder heir Ronald Lauder.

In the 2000s, Nader left Washington and spent most of his time in the Middle East, especially in Iraq after the 2003 Iraq invasion. During that time, Nader volunteered to act as a "shadow diplomat" connecting U.S. politicians to Middle Eastern officials. Erik Prince, founder of security firm Blackwater, hired Nader to help with contracts with the Iraqi government; in a 2010 deposition, Prince identified Nader as a "business development consultant".

In August 2016, Nader met with Donald Trump Jr. at Trump Tower offering assistance to his father's presidential campaign. Nader served as an envoy representing Saudi Arabia's Crown Prince and de facto ruler Mohammad bin Salman, and Mohammed bin Zayed Al Nahyan, the Crown Prince of the Emirate of Abu Dhabi. The meeting included Erik Prince and Joel Zamel, an Israeli specialist in social media manipulation and owner of intelligence gathering firms including Wikistrat and the Psy-Group, who bragged to have received $2 million from Nader as part of the presidential campaign.

Nader attended a December 2016 meeting in New York between the United Arab Emirates officials and president-elect Donald Trump's associates Jared Kushner, Michael Flynn, and Steve Bannon. In January 2017 he was at a meeting on the Seychelles islands between the Emiratis and Prince and was present when Prince met with officials from the UAE and Kirill Dmitriev, head of state-run Russian Direct Investment Fund.

Working with Republican fundraiser Elliott Broidy in 2017, Nader funded a conference criticizing Qatar that was hosted by the Foundation for Defense of Democracies. At the time Nader and Broidy were pushing the White House to remove Secretary of State Rex Tillerson, whom the Saudis and Emiratis saw as insufficiently tough on Iran and Qatar.

In January 2018, Nader was served a grand jury subpoena, and special counsel Robert Mueller's investigators questioned him to elicit if the UAE had tried to influence members of Trump's campaign. Kathryn Ruemmler, an Obama-era White House counsel, was among the lawyers representing Nader. Nader was granted immunity for information for the investigation.

== Legal issues ==
=== Campaign finance charges ===
In December 2019, court documents were unsealed that showed Nader had been charged in federal court with violating campaign finance laws, and falsifying records. The prosecutors alleged that, using banking industry executive Andy Khawaja as a front to obscure the source, Nader sent over $3.5 million to organizations supporting Hillary Clinton's 2016 campaign for president, in an attempt to cultivate ties with the candidate. Following Donald Trump's election, Khawaja donated $1 million to the inauguration organizers. The documents indicated that Nader continually reported the status of his efforts to an unnamed foreign nation. Nader pleaded guilty in 2021 to "felony conspiracy to defraud the US government" in the case, and he was sentenced in July 2023 to 20 months in prison, to be served at the end of his in-progress sentence for child sexual abuse. (See below.)

=== Child sexual abuse charges ===
Nader has been convicted of multiple crimes (alleged) A 1985 charge of receiving films and magazines from the Netherlands depicting pre- and post-pubescent boys engaged in sexual acts was dismissed due to an invalid search warrant. A federal court in Virginia in 1991 gave him a six-month sentence on a felony charge of transporting pornographic videotapes from Germany of boys about 13 or 14 years old. Prosecutors agreed to put the case under seal "due to the extremely sensitive nature of Mr. Nader's work in the Middle East."

In 2003, he was convicted in Prague, Czech Republic, of sexually abusing ten boys, for which he served one year in prison. A spokesperson of the court told press that the crimes occurred between 1999 and 2002. In one case, at his room in the Hilton Prague Hotel, Nader requested oral sex from a 14-year-old boy. After the boy refused, Nader masturbated in front of him and paid him 2,000 koruna (about US$60).

In January 2018 he was questioned by FBI agents working on behalf of special counsel Robert Mueller, as agents inspected it pursuant to a warrant. In June 2019, he was arrested by federal agents and charged with possession of child pornography and images of bestiality and, for a second time, transportation of child pornography, and held in jail pending trial in Virginia. Also in 2019 he was charged with transporting a 14-year-old Czech boy from Europe for sex at his Washington-area home in February 2000. Nader reached a plea deal with prosecutors in January 2020: he pleaded guilty to charges of possession of child pornography and transportation of a minor, and in June 2020, he was sentenced to 10 years in prison. The sentence was reduced to five years for cooperation in the Mueller investigation. On February 6, 2025, Nader was released from prison and left the country after testifying in a deposition. Nader was living in a Baltimore halfway house after back-to-back sentences for his child sex crimes and campaign finance fraud.

== See also ==
- Arab lobby in the United States
- Foreign electoral intervention
- Russian interference in the 2016 United States elections
  - Mueller report
- Saudi Arabia–United States relations
- Saudi Arabia lobby in the United States
- United Arab Emirates–United States relations
