= Risk and strategic consulting =

Aspect of international politics and economics

Risk and strategic consulting refers to the provision of information, analysis and associated services in the field of international politics and economics, with the aim of providing a better understanding of the risks and opportunities facing businesses, governments and other groups.

In contrast to management consulting, which primarily concerns internal organization and performance, risk and strategic consulting aims to provide clients with an improved understanding of the political and economic climate in which they operate. Most such consultancy is focused on those developing countries and emerging markets in which political and business risks may be greater, harder to manage, or harder to assess. Risk and strategic consulting is sometimes carried out alongside other activities such as corporate investigation, forensic accounting, employee screening or vetting, and the provision of security systems, training or procedures. Some of the largest groups in the industry include Kroll Inc. and Control Risks Group, though the size and range of consultancies varies widely, with groups such as Black Cube and Hakluyt & Company providing boutique services.

Risk and strategic consultancy does not generally involve the operational 'risk assessment' carried out by many companies and consultancies. Risk assessment in this sense covers the identification and management of commercial, operational and technical risks within existing operations or known markets. Risk and strategic consultancy also concerns countries and concerns similar to those of interest to private military companies, though the two industries are distinct. Risk and strategy consultancies should not be confused with international lobbying or advocacy groups, though there are occasional overlaps. Clients of risk and strategic consulting firms include companies, governments and government agencies, charities and non-government organizations, academic institutions and individuals.

== See also ==
- Foreign policy interest group
