= Edgar Prince =

American engineer and businessman (1931–1995)

- Born: Edgar Dale Prince; May 3, 1931
- Died: March 2, 1995 (aged 63)
- Education: Michigan Technological University (BS)
- Occupations: Engineer, businessman
- Spouse: Elsa Zwiep
- Children: 4, including Betsy DeVos and Erik Prince

Edgar Dale Prince (May 3, 1931 – March 2, 1995) was an American engineer and businessman who founded the Prince Corporation, owned by Johnson Controls since 1996.

== Early life ==
Edgar Dale Prince was born on May 3, 1931, in Holland, Michigan, the son of Edith (née De Weert) and Peter Prince. His father died of a stroke when Edgar was 11.

== Career ==
Prince started his career at a company manufacturing die-cast machines in Holland, Michigan. He quit that job in order to start his own manufacturing business with the help of two co-workers. The venture proved very successful, and by the 1970s, he was a leading manufacturer of die-cast machines in Michigan. The Prince Corporation also operated a successful diversification into auto parts by developing sun visors and other interior systems for car manufacturers. After a long period of sustained growth, the company employed thousands in the early 1990s at numerous plants.

Ownership in the business made Prince one of the wealthiest men in Michigan. He co-founded the Family Research Council, a conservative Christian public policy organization. He also supported constructive civic projects such as the renovation and preservation of downtown Holland. He and his wife are credited by the town with having saved the historic Tower Clock building from demolition.

Prince died in 1995 of a heart attack. Despite the CEO saying that the company would remain family owned, his company was sold the following year for $1.35 billion to Johnson Controls.

== Personal life ==
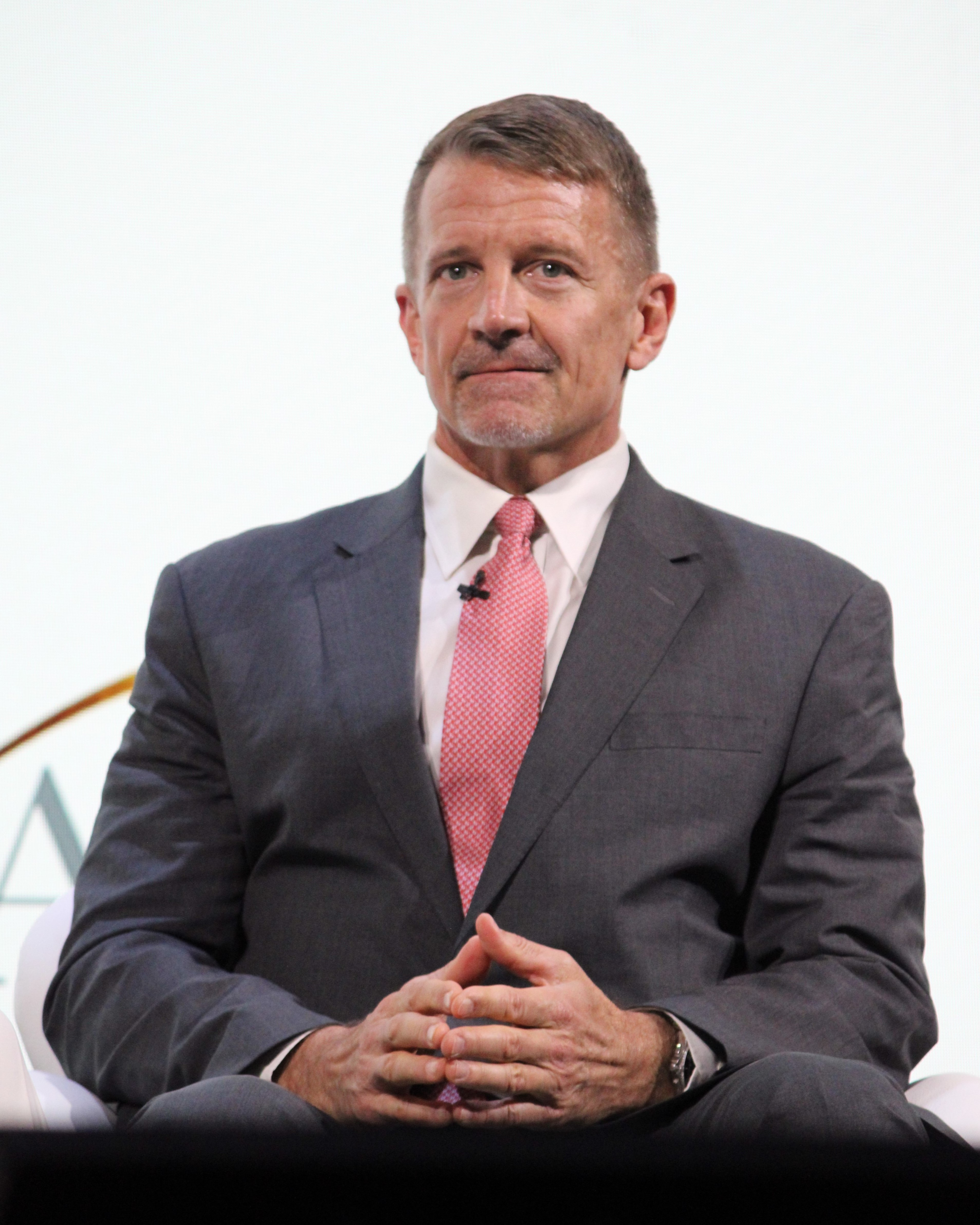
Prince's son Erik in 2025

Prince was married to Elsa Zwiep and together they had four children: Elisabeth (DeVos), the Trump administration's Secretary of Education; Erik, CEO of Academi (formerly Blackwater); Eileen (Ellens); and Emilie (Wierda).

== Death ==
Prince died on March 2, 1995, in Holland, Michigan.

== Genealogy ==
According to the 1940 U.S. Census, his father, Peter Prince, 32 years, was born in Illinois and had completed 5 years of education and his occupation was truck driver; while his mother, Edith, 34 years, was born in Michigan, and had completed 8 years of education. Their children are listed as: Ruth Arleen, 10 years, Edgar Dale, 8 years, and Lyle Vernon, 4 years. They continued to live in Ward 5 of the city of Holland, Michigan.

According to the 1930 U.S. Census, Ward 5, Holland, Ottawa County, Michigan, his paternal grandparents birth places were listed as: Peter Prince's father born in the Netherlands and his mother was born in Illinois. At this time, Peter worked as a finisher in stamping works. His maternal grandparents birth places were listed as: Edith's father was born in Michigan and her mother was born in the Netherlands.

According to the 1910 U.S. Census, Chicago Ward 33, Cook County, Illinois, Edgar's paternal grandparents were living in a marriage of 4 years. The head of household was Garret Prince, age 25, shipping clerk at a paint factory, who immigrated in 1888 and was naturalized. He owned a mortgaged house. The enumerator wrote that he was born in Holland, as were his parents, but crossed that out to write "Dutch" instead. The wife was listed as Maria, 22 years, born in Illinois of a father born in Germany and a mother born in Holland, also rewritten as "Dutch". The children were Peter, 2 years, and Janette, 18 months.
