= Frontier Services Group =

Chinese state-owned security, logistics, insurance company

- Native name: 先丰服务集团
- Type: Partially state-owned enterprise
- Traded as: SEHK: 500
- Industry: Private security, logistics, and insurance
- Founder: Erik Prince
- Headquarters: Hong Kong
- Key people: Dongyi Hua (CEO)
- Website: www.fsgroup.com

Frontier Services Group (FSG) is a Chinese partially state-owned Africa-focused security, aviation, and logistics company founded and led until April 2021 by Erik Prince, the former head of Blackwater Worldwide. Prince has described FSG's main corporate mission as helping Chinese businesses to work safely in Africa. The company operates logistical projects for shipping routes in Africa, and also conducts high-risk evacuations from conflict zones. FSG's area of service has since expanded to the Belt and Road areas of Africa, Central Asia, and Southeast Asia.

== Services ==
According to FSG in September 2017, it does not provide services involving armed personnel or training armed personnel. In some cases, it provides personnel and training to help non-military personnel provide close protection security, without the use of arms. However, critics have voiced concern that Prince's work as FSG chairman has included efforts to sell paramilitary programs and services. FSG ended contracts with two of Prince's closest associates within the company after becoming suspicious that they were assisting Prince in unauthorized paramilitary contracts. In addition, FSG oversees "anti-terrorist security" training programs in a school it partially owns, going so far to feature the newly trained "specialists" in a promotional video.

== Structure ==
The FSG headquarters are in Hong Kong, but the business headquarter is located in Beijing. FSG has branches in Shanghai, Kunming, Dubai, Malta, Nairobi, and Cape Town. Multiple ex-US Army officers serve in the leadership.

Frontier Services Group is partially owned by CITIC Group, a state-run investment fund owned and controlled by the People's Republic of China. CITIC is FSG's largest shareholder.

FSG's current CEO is Dongyi Hua. J. David Whittingham is FSG's Group Vice President & Head of Africa. His responsibilities include business development, corporate development, mergers and acquisitions and investor relations.

== History ==
FSG was initially a Bermuda-registered electronics company called "DVN Holdings Limited". DVN was renamed to FSG in January 2014 to reflect its change in direction.

In May 2014, it was reported that Prince's plan to build a diesel refinery in South Sudan, in which $10 million had already been invested, was suspended. The halted refinery project was reported to be supported personally by the country's president, Salva Kiir. Frontier Services Group was reported to be paid $23.3 million by South Sudan's Ministry of Petroleum to transport supplies and perform maintenance on oil production facilities.

As part of Prince's Africa-focused investment strategy, Frontier Services Group purchased stakes in two Kenyan aviation companies, Kijipwa Aviation and Phoenix Aviation, to provide logistics services for the country's oil and gas industry. In October 2014, the Kenya Civil Aviation Authority denied Kijipwa Aviation an aviation license renewal.

Prince also purchased a 25% stake in Austrian aviation company Airborne Technologies. In 2014, Prince commissioned the company to modify Thrush 510G crop-dusters with surveillance equipment, machine guns, armor, and other weapons, including custom pylons that could mount either NATO or Russian ballistics. One of the modified crop-dusters was delivered to Salva Kiir's forces in South Sudan shortly before a contract with Frontier Services Group was cancelled. Frontier Services Group owns two of the modified Thrush 510Gs, but since executives learned the craft had been weaponized by Prince, the company has declined to sell or use the aircraft to avoid violating U.S. export controls.

In December 2016, FSG announced its plans to set up a “forward operating base” in Yunnan to provide logistics and unarmed security training services to facilitate One Belt, One Road-related projects in Southeast Asia.

In May 2017, FSG acquired 25% of a Chinese private security training school called International Security and Defense College (ISDC). FSG has since overseen the school's program of training "overseas security specialists".

FSG announced plans to work with Mozambique hidden-debt companies in December 2017. FSG established operations in Iraq in 2018.

In 2019, FSG signed contracts to support China's Belt and Road Initiative, including building a series of bases in China's Xinjiang, where the re-education camps of ethnic Uyghurs attracted widespread allegations of human rights abuse. Chinese Communist Party officials in Xinjiang reported that FSG's work would enhance the paramilitary Xinjiang Production and Construction Corps.

Effective April 13, 2021, Erik Prince resigned from his positions as executive director and deputy chairman of the company.

=== U.S. sanctions ===
In June 2023, the United States Department of Commerce added Frontier Services Group to the Bureau of Industry and Security's Entity List due to its training and support of the People's Liberation Army.
