= Control Risks =

UK worldwide insurance consulting and intelligence firm

- Company type: Corporation
- Industry: Consulting; Professional services
- Founded: 1975
- Headquarters: London, United Kingdom
- Number of locations: 41 offices across the globe
- Key people: Bill Udell (CEO)
- Products: Security services
- Website: www.controlrisks.com

Control Risks is a global risk and strategic consulting firm that specializes in geo-political, security, technical, and integrity risk assessments. It offers a wide range of services including cyber risks assessments, open source intelligence and threat monitoring, and building risk assessments. In 2014, The Guardian called it the "largest and best-known" crisis response firm in the world.

Control Risks publishes ‘RiskMap’, a forecast of business risk, geopolitical risks and trends, as well as a geopolitical calendar with events and anniversaries around the world.

== History ==
Control Risks was formed in London in 1975 when Julian Radcliffe, one of the company's founders, approached kidnap and ransom underwriters at Lloyd's and suggested they provide an insurance service to support organisations who have employees potentially exposed to the risk of kidnapping. Therefore, the initial focus for Control Risks was on providing kidnap and ransom support, and associated security consultancy services, with much of the work concentrated in Latin America.

The firm expanded its capabilities when these crisis management and incident response specialists were joined by political and security risk analysts, before becoming independent in 1982 following a management buyout.

The first employees were hired in 1979 to deliver a new analysis service called Information Services, which covered 60 countries and was published once a month in hard copy. Their in-house team of political risk and country analysts formed the basis of the Global Risk Analysis business. In the 1980s, the company expanded its geographical footprint opening new offices in Melbourne, Bogotá, Konigstein, and Amsterdam. Control Risks opened an office in Bethesda, Maryland in 1982.

The business intelligence and investigation capability was established in the early 1990s. Further alignment of their due diligence expertise with existing political analysis capabilities led the continued growth of the investigations practices.

The 9/11 terrorist attacks in the United States accelerated the development of the firm's 24-hour travel and personal security service, CR1. Control Risks established a significant presence in Iraq following the Iraq War in 2003 and more recently Ukraine in 2022. This initially took the form of protective support for the diplomatic community.

== Products and solutions ==
Control Risks offers products such as:

- Control Risks ONE – a 24/7 Global Risk Operations Centre that provides advisory, monitoring, and response support.
- Seerist – a predictive geolocation analytics solution to understand and respond to disruptive events.
- Control Risks VANTAGE – third‑party risk and compliance solutions compatible across sectors and jurisdictions.
- ESG Country Monitor and Sanctions Country Monitor – dashboards to evaluate ESG exposure and sector‑specific sanctions risks across jurisdictions.

== Global presence ==
The firm maintains 41 offices across continents, emphasising local language capabilities, regional data privacy knowledge, and embedded support models. The ControlRisks ONE and the threat monitoring operates on a 'follow the sun model' with urgent work often being handed between teams to ensure rapid delivery.
