= Islamabad Policy Research Institute =

Pakistani think tank founded in 1999

- انسٹی ٹیوٹ تحقیقات پالیسی اسلام آباد
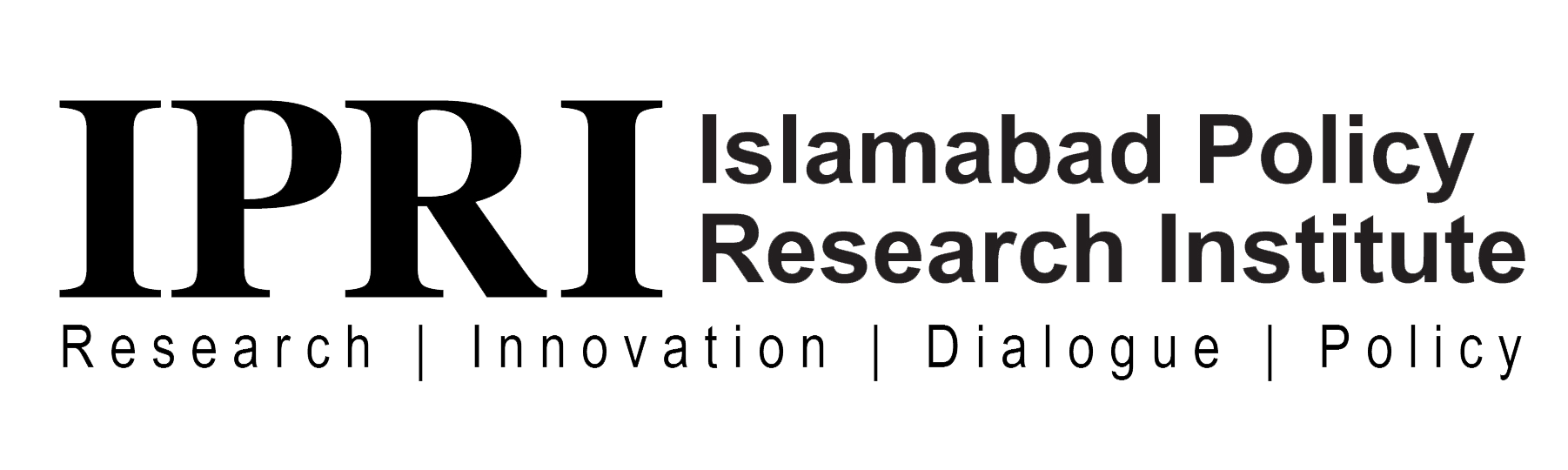

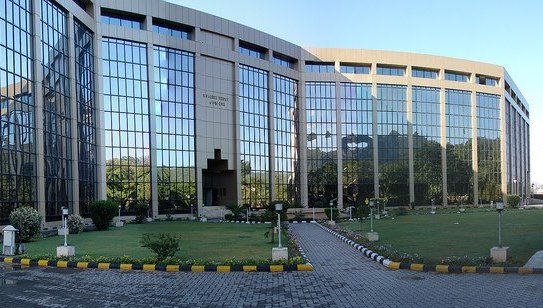
- IPRI's headquarters in Islamabad, Pakistan
- Abbreviation: IPRI
- Formation: 1999
- Type: Semi-governmental
- Headquarters: Islamabad, Pakistan
- Location: Pakistan
- President: Lt Gen (retd) Majid Ehsan
- IPRI Leadership: Brig (retd) Dr. Raashid Wali Janjua – Director (Research & Analysis); Siddique Humayun – Director (Advocacy & Communication)
- Website: ipripak.org

The Islamabad Policy Research Institute (IPRI) is a think tank based in Islamabad, Pakistan.

It was established in 1999. It is affiliated with the National Security Division (NSD) of the government of Pakistan. IPRI focuses on datafication, digitalization, and analysis of information relevant to policy decisions. In 2020, IPRI was ranked 74th in the University of Pennsylvania's Think Tanks and Civil Societies Program.

The Institute conducts multi-disciplinary research and promotes civil society-governmental interactions and policy dialogue through national, regional, and international conferences, enhancing the country's research capacity and environment by facilitating issue-centric discourse. IPRI's publications claims to offer current and high-quality research. It disseminates its findings and policy recommendations through its publications.

== Board of Governors ==
The Board of Governors (BOG) has been reconstituted. The 16-member BOG meets biannually to provide policy guidelines and review the progress of research activities.

== US-Pakistan relations ==
In 2024, according to the US Justice Department’s records, IPRI engaged a lobbying firm in the United States to support efforts aimed at strengthening US-Pakistan relations.

== Other events at this institute ==
In July 2025, former Pakistani foreign minister Bilawal Bhutto Zardari asked India to become a partner to jointly combat terrorism in an international conference held at this institute.

A comprehensive study done in July 2025 at this institute revealed a trend in Pakistan of 'how digital platforms have significantly deepened political divisions across the country'.

== Publications ==
- IPRI Journal – Scholarly biannual triple-peer-reviewed journal showcasing research in international relations, political science, geopolitics, defense, strategic studies, diplomacy, security, terrorism, conflict, public policy and governance.
- Recrudescence of TTP Violence – Its Causes and Possible Remedies.
