= Erik Prince =

American businessman and founder of Blackwater USA (born 1969)

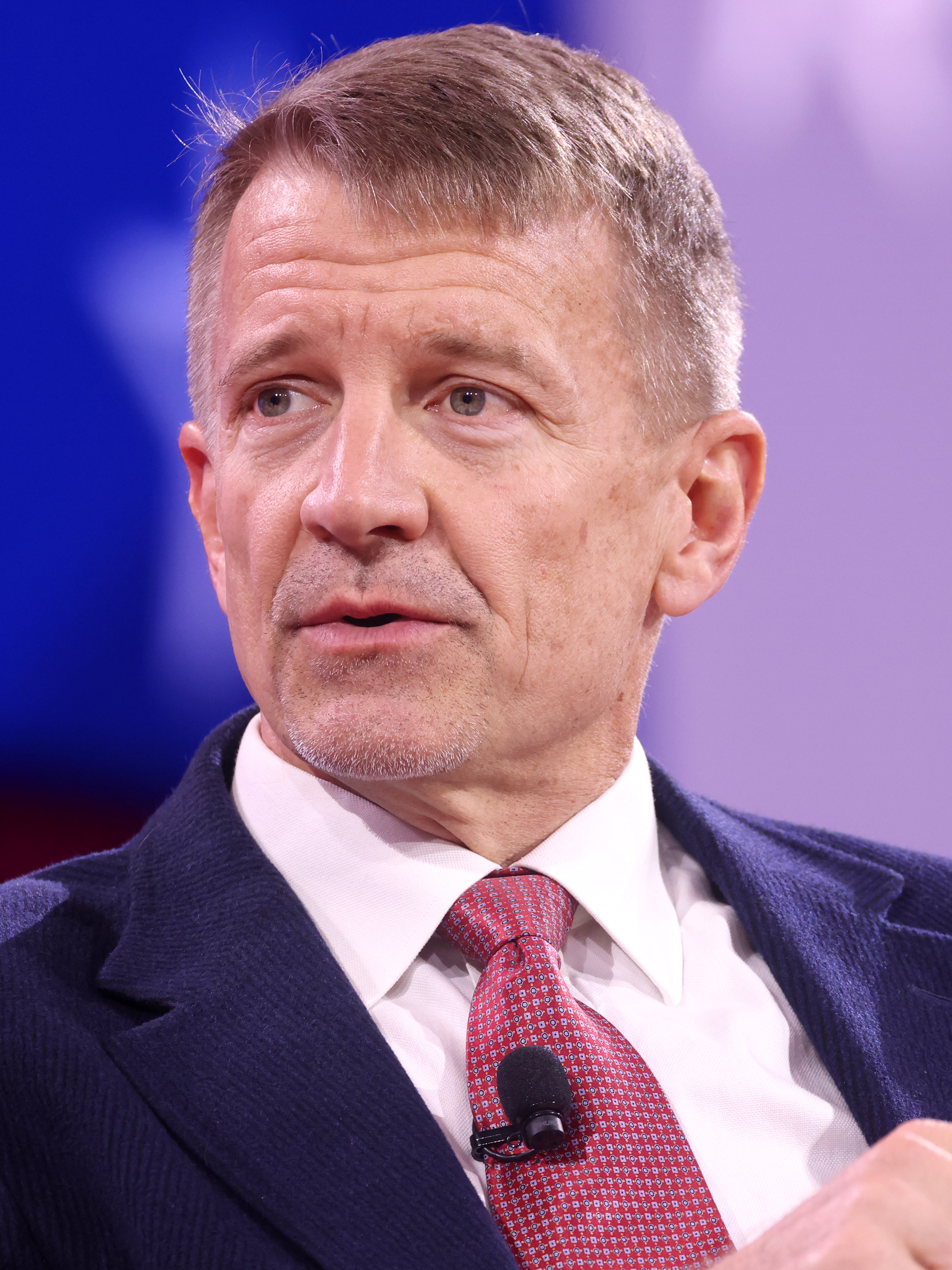
- Prince in 2025
- Born: June 6, 1969 (age 57); Holland, Michigan, U.S.
- Education: Hillsdale College (BA)
- Known for: Founder of Blackwater
- Spouses: Joan Prince (m. 1991; died 2003) Joanna Houck (m. 2004; div. 2012): Stacy DeLuke (m. date unknown)
- Children: 12
- Father: Edgar Prince
- Relatives: Betsy DeVos (sister)
- Military career
- Allegiance: United States
- Branch: United States Navy
- Service years: 1992–1995
- Rank: Lieutenant
- Unit: SEAL Team 8

Erik Dean Prince (born June 6, 1969) is an American businessman, who is the founder of private military contractor Blackwater. He was Blackwater's CEO until 2009 and its chairman until its sale to a group of investors in 2010. Prince founded the private equity firm Frontier Resource Group in 2012 and was chairman of the Hong Kong-listed Frontier Services Group until 2021. Prince is the son of engineer and businessman Edgar Prince, and the brother of former U.S. secretary of education Betsy DeVos.

== Early life, education, and military service ==
Prince was born on June 6, 1969, in Holland, Michigan, the son of Edgar D. Prince and his wife, Elsa (née Zwiep), (Note: Until her marriage to Edgar Prince, she was known by her maiden name, Elsa Zwiep. Following their marriage, she was known as Elsa Prince. After his death in 1995 she married, in 2000, a minister, Ren Broekhuizen, and was known as Elsa Prince-Broekhuizen.) and the youngest of four children. He graduated from Holland Christian High School. Prince and his father toured the world together, visiting the Dachau concentration camp, divided Berlin, and the battlefields of Normandy. According to his mother, these trips "made a big impression" on the young Prince.

Prince was accepted into the United States Naval Academy and attended for three semesters before leaving, explaining that he loved the Navy but disliked the academy. He went on to receive his B.A. in economics from Hillsdale College in 1992. During his time at Hillsdale, he served as a volunteer firefighter and as a cold-water diver for the Hillsdale County Sheriff's Department. Prince eventually became an emergency medical technician.

In 1990, Prince secured an internship in the White House under George H. W. Bush, but soon left to intern for California congressman Dana Rohrabacher, President Ronald Reagan's former speechwriter. Rohrabacher described Prince as "a bright, driven young man." At the age of 21, Prince volunteered to search for a mass grave in Nicaragua, to expose killings that had taken place under President Daniel Ortega and later said that he had found the mass grave.

After college, Prince was commissioned as an officer in the United States Navy via Officer Candidate School in 1992. Prince then received orders to Basic Underwater Demolition/SEAL training (BUD/S) at Naval Amphibious Base Coronado. After six months of training, Prince graduated with BUD/S class 188 in 1993. Following SEAL Tactical Training (STT) and completion of six month probationary period, he received the 1130 designator as a Naval Special Warfare Officer, entitled to wear the Special Warfare insignia. He deployed with SEAL Team 8 to Haiti, the Middle East, and the Balkans. He credits the SEALs for being an outlet for his entrepreneurial spirit. In his autobiography he states that during the Yugoslav Wars in the early 1990s, he realized that there was a need for private training facilities for special operations. Following his father's death in 1995, Prince ended his U.S. Navy service prematurely. A year later, Prince helped facilitate the sale of his father's auto parts company to Johnson Controls for US$1.35 billion.

== Blackwater (1997–2010) ==
Prince moved to Virginia Beach and personally financed the formation of Blackwater Worldwide in 1997. He bought 6,000 acres (24 km^{2}) of the Great Dismal Swamp of North Carolina and set up a school for special operations. The name "Blackwater" comes from the peat-colored bogs in which the school is located.

Prince credits the 1994 Rwandan genocide with his decision to found Blackwater. He later said, "It really bothered me. It made me realize you can't sit back and pontificate. You have to act."

From 1997 to 2010, Blackwater was awarded $2 billion in government security contracts, more than $1.6 billion of which were unclassified federal contracts and an unknown amount of classified work. From 2001 to 2010, the Central Intelligence Agency (CIA) awarded up to $600 million in classified contracts to Blackwater and its affiliates. It became the largest of the State Department's three private security companies, providing 987 guards for embassies and bases abroad. Prince built a shooting range on his rural Virginia land as a nearby training facility to CIA headquarters in Langley, Virginia.

Blackwater came under increasing criticism after the Nisour Square massacre in September 2007, in which Blackwater employees opened fire in a crowded square in Baghdad, killing 17 Iraqi civilians and seriously wounding 20 more. Three guards were convicted in October 2014 of 14 manslaughter charges, and another of murder, in a U.S. court in 2019.

The criticism continued after president Barack Obama took office in 2009. Prince said he believes that much of this criticism stems from politics. "I put myself and my company at the CIA's disposal for some very risky missions", Prince told Vanity Fair for its January 2010 issue. "But when it became politically expedient to do so, someone threw me under the bus." Blackwater lost a $1 billion contract with the State Department to protect American diplomatic personnel in 2009, after the Iraqi government refused to renew the company's operating license. Nevertheless, in 2010 the Obama administration awarded the company a $120 million State Department security contract and about $100 million in new CIA work.

In 2012 Blackwater's successor company, Academi, paid a combined $49.5 million to settle charges of arms trafficking violations dating back to the period Prince was CEO and chairman of the company. In 2020 Prince again became the focus of an FBI investigation into arms trafficking violations related to the conversion of crop dusters into military aircraft. According to a UN report, Prince also violated a UN arms embargo by aiding a plot to arm a Libyan warlord attempting to overthrow the US and UN backed government in Libya.

Prince has defended Blackwater's work, pointing to the fact that during the course of 40,000 personal security missions, only 200 involved guards firing their weapons. He has said, "No one under our care was ever killed or injured. We kept them safe, all the while we had 30 of our men killed."

Prince, according to author Robert Young Pelton, reportedly thinks of Blackwater's relationship to the military as something similar to FedEx's relationship to the U.S. Post Office: "an efficient, privatized solution to sclerotic and wasteful government bureaucracy." He credits his father's competitive streak in the automotive business with the inspiration to design a lighter, faster army.

Prince resigned as CEO of Blackwater on March 2, 2009, and remained chairman of the board until he sold the company in late 2010 to a group of investors.

=== CIA task force ===
Prince was part of a CIA task force created to engage in targeted killings of suspected terrorists. Prince alleged that the House intelligence congressional committee leaked his name to the press. Prince has said that he is convinced that former CIA director Leon Panetta revealed him as a CIA asset, after shutting down the covert CIA training operation in 2009.

== Post-Blackwater activities ==
=== UAE private security force ===
After Blackwater faced mounting legal problems in the United States, Prince was hired by the crown prince of Abu Dhabi and moved to Abu Dhabi in 2010. His task was to assemble an 800-member group of foreign troops for the U.A.E., which was planned months before the Arab Spring. He helped the UAE found a new company named Reflex Responses, or R2, with 51 percent local ownership, carefully avoiding his name on corporate documents. He worked to oversee the effort and recruit troops, among others from Executive Outcomes, a former South African mercenary firm hired by several African governments during the 1990s to defeat violent rebellions in addition to protecting oil and diamond reserves.

As of January 2011, Prince was training a force of 2,000 Somalis for anti-piracy operations in the Gulf of Aden. The program was funded by several Arab countries, including the United Arab Emirates and backed by the United States. Prince's spokesman, Mark Corallo, said Prince had "no financial role" in the project and declined to answer any questions about Prince's involvement. John Burnett of Maritime Underwater Security Consultants said, "There are 34 nations with naval assets trying to stop piracy and it can only be stopped on land. With Prince's background and rather illustrious reputation, I think it's quite possible that it might work."

As Americans and others were being evacuated following the August 2021 collapse of the Afghan government, Prince said he was offering seats on a chartered flight for $6,500 per person.

=== Russia ===
In 2011, Prince was invited to Moscow by the Russian Federation. The Russian Federation requested that Prince build "a Blackwater capability" in Russia. Prince trained and drank with Alpha Group, the special forces unit of the Federal Security Service (FSB).

=== Frontier Resource Group and Africa ===
Under the Frontier Resource Group, Erik Prince invested his own capital in oil and mineral extraction projects in countries including Guinea and South Sudan. FRG's investment activities included taking stakes in aviation and logistics-related companies in Africa and Europe intended to support mining and energy-sector operations. These included Kenyan aviation firms Kijipwa Aviation and Phoenix Aviation, which were linked to oil and gas logistics in East Africa, although Kijipwa Aviation later lost its license renewal in 2014. He also acquired a stake in Austrian aviation company Airborne Technologies, through which Thrush 510G crop-duster aircraft were modified with surveillance equipment, armor, and provisions for mounting weapon systems, including NATO- and Russian-compatible pylons.

In 2014, Prince’s planned diesel refinery project in South Sudan (backed by approximately US$10 million in investment) was suspended amid instability, despite reported support from President Salva Kiir. FSG also received contracts from South Sudan's Ministry of Petroleum reportedly worth US$23.3 million to transport supplies and maintain oil infrastructure. To the government of South Sudan, Prince sold three Mi-24 attack helicopters, two L-39 jets, and the services of Hungarian mercenary pilots to operate the aircraft, all for the sum of $43 million. One of the Hungarian pilots attracted some infamy by using his Facebook page to boast about his daily killings.

== China's Belt and Road Initiative ==
Frontier Services Group (FSG) is a Hong Kong–listed company co-founded by Erik Prince, who served as chairman until April 13, 2021. Backed by China's state-owned CITIC Group and Hong Kong investor Johnson Chun Shun Ko, FSG evolved from the ecosystem established by Prince's earlier Frontier Resource Group. With FSG he pivoted toward Chinese investors and overseas commercial activity in Africa and Asia. Prince describes FSG as a logistics and infrastructure support firm (not a security company) providing transport, aviation, and construction support for Chinese projects in challenging environments.

=== International Security Defense College ===
In May 2017, FSG acquired a 25% stake in the International Security Defense College in Beijing, a private training institution offering courses in counterterrorism, high-risk operations, and overseas security for military, law enforcement, and private personnel. FSG subsequently oversaw training programs for overseas security specialists.

== Libya ==
In April 2020, The Intercept reported that Prince has offered his services as a subcontractor to Russian Wagner group's activities in Mozambique and Libya, suggesting to provide aerial surveillance platforms and a ground force. Investigations by Rolling Stone and The New York Times, based on an internal United Nations report, have since revealed a number of connections between Prince and the Libyan warlord Khalifa Haftar's attempts in 2019 to overthrow the U.N.-backed government of Libya.

On April 14, 2019, Erik Prince made a proposal of an $80 million deal to Libya's militia leader Khalifa Haftar to supply aircraft and other military equipment. Called "Project Opus," it involved purchase of surplus military helicopters from Jordan. The plan was designed to supply intelligence surveillance aircraft, drones, armed assault helicopters, maritime interdiction, and cyber intelligence and targeting capabilities to Haftar's forces. The project was, however, aborted in June 2019. The planning, management and financing of the Prince's project was done using three firms from the United Arab Emirates, including Lancaster 6 DMCC, L-6 FZE and Opus Capital Asset Limited FZE, which were using a web of shell companies.

Two of these Emirati firms, Lancaster 6 and Opus Capital Asset were linked to a team of private mercenaries and the unique Pilatus PC-6 ISR aircraft deployed to Libya to support Haftar. Besides, UAE's L-6 FZE owned a crop duster, LASA T-Bird, which was part of Erik Prince's Project Opus. A UN report in March 2021 revealed that the Light, Attack and Surveillance Aircraft (LASA), which debuted at the Paris Air Show in 2017, flew to Serbia for maintenance in August 2018. The UN stated that the 'agricultural' plane was modified to carry some deadly rockets, including a 32-57mm Rocket Pod, a 16-57mm Rocket Pod and a gun pod fitted with twin 23mm cannon under the aircraft's wings.

=== FBI Investigation ===
Erik Prince was under an investigation by the Federal Bureau of Investigation (FBI) for his alleged involvement in the attempted sale of Jordanian arms to the UAE-backed Khalifa Haftar, as part of the 2019 plan. Previous investigations had revealed that Prince and others breached the Libyan arms embargo. As per the reports, Prince worked with a Jordanian royal, Faisal ibn al-Hussein, to organize the sale and transfer of aircraft and other materiel from Jordan to Libya. Prince's associate and an Australian pilot, Christiaan Durrant attempted to assure the Jordanian officials that he had "clearances from everywhere" and that the work was approved "at the highest level". However, after Jordan rejected the deal, a meeting was called by Prince at the Army and Navy Club in the US. Also attended by Durrant and a member of Donald Trump's National Security Council, the meeting had an agenda where Durrant explained to the NSC official about Prince's Libyan campaign to support Haftar and asked for the US' support. The United Nations had also tracked transfer of three aircraft owned by Erik Prince to a close associate for use in Libya. It was also reported that the planes were transferred from Prince's companies to a mercenary firm connected to him and based in the United Arab Emirates. Apart from the investigations, Prince was not charged with a crime.

== Political activities ==
=== Ties to Trump campaigns ===
The New York Times reported in May 2018 that Prince arranged an August 2016 meeting in Trump Tower, attended by himself, Donald Trump Jr., George Nader, and Joel Zamel, during which Nader reportedly told Trump Jr. the crown princes of Saudi Arabia and the UAE were eager to help his father win the election, and Zamel pitched a social media manipulation campaign from his Israeli company Psy-Group. Prince had stated in his November 2017 testimony to the House Intelligence Committee that he had no formal communications or contact, nor any unofficial role, with the Trump campaign. Asked about this contradiction in March 2019, Prince replied, "I don't know if [the Committee] got the transcript wrong" and "not all the discussion that day was transcribed, and that's a fact." Prince acknowledged for the first time in March 2019 that he had attended the 2016 Trump Tower meeting, asserting he was there to "talk about Iran policy".

Special Counsel investigators have examined a meeting around January 11, 2017, in the Seychelles that was convened by the UAE Crown Prince Mohammed bin Zayed Al Nahyan (known as "MBZ"), which Prince attended. Also present at that meeting were Nader and Kirill Dmitriev, the CEO of the state-owned Russian Direct Investment Fund, who is close to Vladimir Putin. UAE officials reportedly believed that Prince was representing the Trump transition and Dmitriev was representing Putin. The Washington Post had reported on April 3, 2017, that American, European and Arab officials said the Seychelles meeting was "part of an apparent effort to establish a back-channel line of communication between Moscow and President-elect Donald Trump." Prince denied in his November 2017 House Intelligence Committee testimony that he had represented the Trump transition or that the meeting involved any back-channel. The Washington Post reported on March 7, 2018, that the Special Counsel had gathered evidence that contradicts Prince, and ABC News reported on April 6, 2018, that Nader had met with Prince at a Manhattan hotel days before the Seychelles meeting and later provided him with biographical information about Dmitriev.

The Mueller report later found that Nader had represented Prince to Dmitriev as "designated by Steve [Bannon] to meet you! I know him and he is very very well connected and trusted by the New Team", while Prince "acknowledged that it was fair for Nader to think that Prince would pass information on to the Transition Team", although Bannon told investigators that Prince had not informed him of the Dmitriev meeting in advance. Prince testified to the House Intelligence Committee that "I didn't fly there to meet any Russian guy", although the Mueller report found that he and Nader made significant preparations to meet Dmitriev. Although Prince characterized a second meeting between him and Dmitriev in a hotel bar as a chance encounter of no consequence, the meeting was actually pre-arranged after Prince had learned from calls back home that Russia had moved an aircraft carrier off Libya and he wanted to convey that the United States would not accept any Russian involvement in Libya.

House Intelligence Committee chairman Adam Schiff announced on April 30, 2019, that he was sending a criminal referral to the Justice Department alleging Prince had provided false testimony to the committee. United States Assistant Attorney General Stephen Boyd confirmed on February 4, 2020, that the Department of Justice was opening an investigation into Prince.

On December 30, 2019, it was reported that Prince had traveled to Venezuela to meet with a top aide of Nicolas Maduro. Prince has been referred to the United States Treasury Department for possible violations of sanctions against the Maduro government.

=== Political infiltration operations ===
The New York Times reported in March 2020 that Prince recruited former intelligence agents to infiltrate "Democratic congressional campaigns, labor organizations and other groups considered hostile to the Trump agenda." Prince's efforts were reportedly conducted to assist Project Veritas, a widely discredited conservative organization that was described as disseminating "coordinated disinformation" due to its repeated use of deceptively edited videos in attempts to discredit Democrats, the media, and liberal groups. Until mid-2018, Richard Seddon, a former British spy, headed the field operations for the plots and trained operatives in Wyoming at the Prince ranch. Prince also reportedly arranged for Project Veritas employees to receive intelligence training, which ended when the trainer quit because the group "wasn't capable of learning". Prince continued to support Project Veritas after the organization's failure to disclose to state regulators the criminal conviction of its founder, James O'Keefe, resulted in the revocation of their charitable organization status in multiple states, and caused other donors to withdraw their financial support.

In May 2021, The New York Times reported that Project Veritas, with the assistance of a former British spy and Erik Prince, secretly surveilled government employees during the Trump administration with the goal of discrediting perceived critics of former President Trump. Tactics included arranging dates for FBI employees with the intent to record them. The operation failed to record a single official disparaging Trump despite extensive expenditures including rental of an expensive Georgetown home.

== Second Trump administration ==
=== Deportations ===
In 2025, Politico reported that a group, led by Prince, had pitched the Trump administration on a proposal for deportations with the support of the private sector.

=== Ecuador ===
In March 2025, Prince and Ecuadorian President Daniel Noboa announced a deal to support government security forces in the Ecuadorian conflict. The visit was overshadowed by a controversial security operation in which 63 people were detained and released shortly after, as no crimes were confirmed. Critics labeled it a political stunt. Additionally, Prince made claims against presidential candidate Luisa González, drawing accusations of foreign interference in national politics.

=== Haiti ===
In 2025, Prince reportedly claimed to have a 10-year contract with the Haitian government to combat Haiti's gang violence.

In January 2026, Haitian authorities confirmed that Prince's firm, operating under the name Vectus Global, was conducting anti-gang operations in Haiti, including a January 14, 2026 operation targeting Jimmy "Barbecue" Chérizier.

=== Ukraine ===
Prince has reportedly looked to involve himself in Ukraine.

=== Democratic Republic of the Congo ===
In 2023, the United Nations (UN) linked Prince to a deal in North Kivu, a province in the Democratic Republic of the Congo (DRC). The UN Group of Experts claimed Prince intended to broker a deal that involved the deployment of over two thousand mercenaries from Colombia, Mexico, and Argentina into North Kivu, a region known for its richness in minerals. The mercenaries would have been tasked with halting troop advancement and securing mining areas. The deal stemmed from an agreement between the UAE and DRC. Three South African mercenaries had already scouted the region beforehand.

According to a Reuters report in February 2026, Prince deployed a private security force trained by Israelis to operate drones and help the D.R.Congo's army secure the strategic city of Uvira against Rwanda-backed AFC/M23 rebels.

== Personal life ==
Prince lives in both Middleburg, Virginia, and Abu Dhabi, United Arab Emirates. He converted to Catholicism in 1992 and describes himself as a practicing member of the church.

=== Political views ===
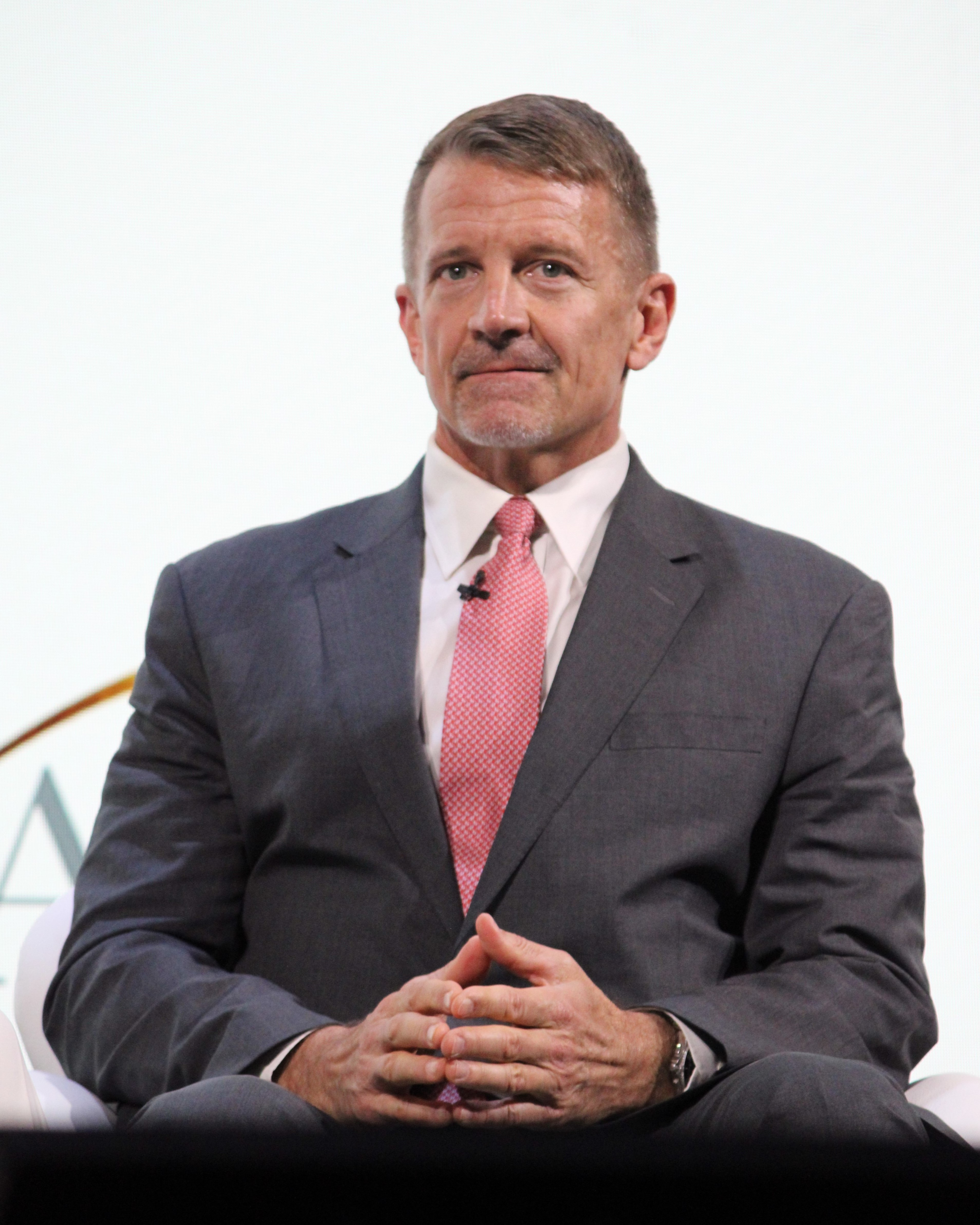
Prince at the Alliance for Responsible Citizenship, London, 2025

Prince describes himself as a libertarian. Prince said, "I'm a very free market guy. I'm not a huge believer that government provides a whole lot of solutions. Some think that government can solve society's problems. I tend to think private charities and private organizations are better solutions."

Prince credits his time as a White House intern with some of his political views. He said that "having that White House internship responsibility and badges, I walked around some of these other cavernous federal agencies, and you want to talk about depressing? Walk through HHS or HUD or Commerce, you name it. Leviathan realized." Speaking of his internship, Prince said, "I saw a lot of things I didn't agree with—homosexual groups being invited in, the budget agreement, the Clean Air Act." Disenchanted, Prince became a backer of presidential candidate Pat Buchanan.

In a 2024 episode of his podcast Prince said, "If so many of these countries around the world are incapable of governing themselves, it's time for us to just put the imperial hat back on, to say, we're going to govern those countries (…) 'cause enough is enough, we're done being invaded. (…) You can say that about pretty much all of Africa, they're incapable of governing themselves."

=== Contributions to political and charitable causes ===
Between 1998 and 2007, Prince donated more than $200,000 to Republican and third-party causes. In 2006, Prince contributed money to the Green Party of Luzerne County, Pennsylvania, as part of a failed effort to help Republican Rick Santorum defeat Democrat Bob Casey. He has donated to the Family Research Council, a beneficiary of the Prince and DeVos families since the 1980s,

In 2016 Prince contributed $250,000 to Donald Trump's presidential campaign and $100,000 to Make America Number 1, a Trump-aligned super PAC helmed by Rebekah Mercer.

Other Republican politicians to whom Prince has contributed include Ron Paul, Walter Jones, Joe Miller, Todd Tiarht, Mike Pence, Dana Rohrabacher, Oliver North, Pat Buchanan, Jim DeMint, Tom Coburn, Duncan L. Hunter, Ted Poe, Jon Kyl, Pete Hoekstra, and Mitt Romney.

Prince is a director of the Prince Foundation, an organization his parents founded in 1979 and which, as of 2025 is no longer seeking donations and has been sunset. In the 1990s Prince founded the Freiheit ("Liberty") Foundation, a nonprofit charity that funded a number of conservative causes. Publicly available tax records indicate the foundation has been largely inactive since 2008 after claiming a $1.8 million loss in 2007 (more than 50 percent of the foundation's assets) related to its investment in Seligman New Technologies Fund, whose manager was accused of engaging in illegal market timing activity.

Prince has frequently donated to conservative Christian organizations, including the Acton Institute for the Study of Religion and Liberty and the Prison Fellowship, and conservative political groups such as the Council for National Policy, of which his father was vice president at the time of his death. After the Nisour Square massacre in which Blackwater employees opened fire in a crowded square in Baghdad, killing seventeen Iraqi civilians and seriously wounding twenty more, Prince supported a Muslim orphanage in Afghanistan and built mosques at Blackwater bases.

=== Family ===
Prince is the younger brother of former United States Secretary of Education Betsy DeVos and the brother-in-law of former Alticor (Amway) president Dick DeVos. (Note: The DeVos family is one of the richest families in the United States and are strong financial supporters of archconservatives.)

Prince's first wife, Joan Nicole, died of cancer in 2003 at the age of 36. She introduced Prince to Catholicism. They had four children. He later wrote that he had an affair with Joanna Ruth Houck, his children's nanny, while his wife was dying. Prince and Houck married in 2004. He is now married to Stacy DeLuke, a former Blackwater spokesperson.

Prince has twelve children. He had four children with each wife.

== See also ==
- Links between Trump associates and Russian officials
- List of United States Navy SEALs
- Report On the Investigation Into Russian Interference in the 2016 Presidential Election
- Timeline of Russian interference in the 2016 United States elections (July 2016 – election day)
- Timeline of investigations into Donald Trump and Russia
