= Newton Glassman =

Canadian businessman

Newton Glassman is the founder and managing partner of Catalyst Capital Group, the second largest private equity firm in Canada. He was also the CEO of Callidus Capital Corp., an alternative lending company that traded publicly before being taken private in 2019, which he led until he stepped down in 2018 citing medical issues.

== Early life and education ==
Glassman is the son of a surgeon. While in college, he successfully sued his father to force child support payments, based on Ontario court records. He received an undergraduate and law degree at the University of Toronto. He then attended business school at Wharton School of the University of Pennsylvania, and graduated with an MBA in 1990.

== Career ==
After graduating he joined Canadian Corporate Funding Ltd., then one of Canada's leading private equity firms. He later joined Cerberus Capital Management in 1997, becoming a managing director at the firm and overseeing the fund’s telecommunications portfolio and Canadian investments. While working at Cerberus, he also developed a distinctive approach to lending to financially distressed companies.

=== Catalyst Capital Group ===
In 2002 Glassman founded Catalyst Capital Group along with Gabriel de Alba. The firm specializes in purchasing distressed assets and corporate restructurings.

Catalyst has been involved in deals involving Gateway Casinos, Canwest and Mobilicity. It earned "a huge return" on the 2009 restructuring of CanWest Global Communications, and Stelco, which faced bankruptcy in 2007.

By 2014, the firm was Canada's second largest private equity firm. In a 2014 puff piece published by the Globe and Mail, Glassman was quoted thus: "You have to be unaffected by conflict to be decent at distressed because it's a highly adversarial process. You have to have extraordinary commitment to your view, both ethically and professionally, because you are dealing with desperate people and desperate people try desperate things. You have to have a commitment to your sense of what is right and wrong. And you can't waver from it."

In 2020, Glassman had a significant win in a deal over the Hudson's Bay Company. After accumulating shares in the company and gaining a 17.5 percent stake in the company, Catalyst posted an 8.8 percent return in its investment in Hudson's Bay for its shareholders.

==== Catalyst buys Callidus ====
Alternative lender Callidus Capital Corp. was founded by Sam Fleiser in 2004. In 2007, Catalyst bought a controlling share in Callidus; Catalyst owns almost 60% of Callidus and is a main source of funding for Callidus as well.

In 2011, Glassman took over Callidus with the goal of making the company public and increasing its loan books. In April 2014, Catalyst took Callidus public at C$14 a share. By 2019, Callidus had posted 10 consecutive quarters of net losses in what was described as a company “meltdown”. Analysts have said legal chill is one likely reason buyers were reluctant to come forward. In October 2019, Braslyn Ltd spent 75 cents a share, 95 per cent below the company’s initial offer price in 2014, and in the transaction bought "the minority shares not owned by Catalyst".

== Philanthropy ==
Glassman donated $2.5 million to the University of Western Ontario's faculty of law as part of a $10 million plan to fund programs on insolvency and restructuring.

The neonatal intensive care unit of Toronto's Sunnybrook Health Sciences Centre has borne Glassman's name since 2014.

== Personal life ==
Glassman works in Toronto, has a Lake House in Muskoka and a retreat in the Bahamas. In 2022, Newton and his wife separated.
