= Black Cube =

Israeli private intelligence and cyber-espionage firm

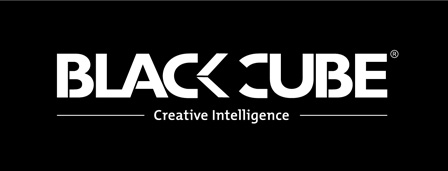
- Type: Private limited company
- Industry: Litigation support Competitive intelligence Risk consulting
- Founded: 2010; 16 years ago
- Headquarters: Tel Aviv; London; Madrid
- Number of employees: 340+
- Website: www.blackcube.com

Black Cube (BC Strategy Ltd) is a private intelligence agency based in London, Tel Aviv, and Madrid. The company was founded in 2010 by former Israeli intelligence officers Dan Zorella (in Hebrew: דן זורלא) and Avi Yanus (in Hebrew: אבי ינוס). Its employees include former members of Israeli intelligence units. In the past, it has supported Israel Defense Forces (IDF) activities.

Black Cube provides intelligence, evidence, and advisory services in multi-jurisdictional legal and white collar crime cases. Their clients are mainly wealthy individuals, oligarchs, and global corporations. Black Cube represents their clients in court cases, manages public relations, and assists in other matters as needed. The company uncovered high-level corruption in Italy, Panama, and Mexico. It is estimated that Black Cube has managed to recover as much as $5.3 billion of assets for its clients and win $14.7 billion through court verdicts or out-of-court settlements.

Black Cube is criticized for not following ethical rules. Its tactics have resulted in a number of international controversies. In Canada, the firm was criticized by an Ontario Court for an attempt that aimed to discredit a judge by trying to get him to make antisemitic comments in secretly recorded meetings. In Romania, two of its employees were convicted of criminal charges involving harassment and hacking. The firm also drew condemnation for covertly surveilling and assisting efforts to discredit women accusing Harvey Weinstein of sexual violence and the investigative journalists researching whether those accusations were credible.

== History ==
BC Strategy Ltd. (Black Cube) has offices in Tel Aviv, London, and Paris. It was founded in 2010 by Avi Yanus a former Israel Defense Forces (IDF) strategic planning officer and Dan Zorella, who was in IDF Military Intelligence. Yanus and Zorella met at the Technion University in Haifa, where they both did undergraduate studies in economics. Yanus went on to complete his PhD in organizational behavior. By 2018, Black Cube had been involved in operations in over sixty countries.

Since 2011, Black Cube has provided evidence for high-profile cases in Canada, Italy, Israel, Mexico, Panama, the United Kingdom and the United States. The company describes itself as a "select group of veterans from the Israeli elite intelligence units that specialises in tailored solutions to complex business and litigation challenges."

Black Cube's International Advisory Board included Meir Dagan, a former chief of Mossad, Israel's national intelligence agency, from 2002 to 2011, and Black Cube's president until he died in 2016. Their IAB includes Efraim Halevy, who was also a head of Mossad for 30 years. Other IAB members include Yohanan Danino, Giora Eiland, Adrian Leppard, Asher Tishler, Paul Reyniers, Golan Malka, and Itiel Maayan.

In a court deposition, Yanus described the bilateral relationship between the IDF and Black Cube's civilian market, where former Israeli intelligence operators advise Black Cube and provide it with a business network. According to Forbes Israel, Black Cube is one of many business intelligence firms such as GPW, and K2, for an industry that expanded to 80 billion dollars in 2015 alone. These intelligence firms attract people who previously worked in IDF Military Intelligence. Salaries are high in the business intelligence sector. Dozens of these firms were established as the demand grew. Forbes Israel called this a "new trend in Israeli exports." Black Cube has said it recruits from Israeli intelligence because they ‘know how to look for the weak points,’ and hires operatives who were born outside of Israel because of their ease in assuming false identities and speaking foreign languages. They are, between them, fluent in more than 30 languages.

== Media coverage ==
In 2014, Israel's Globes published a favorable article about Black Cube after they won several high-profile cases. In their 2018 article, Forbes Israel called Black Cube the "Mossad" of the "business world".

Black Cube has been criticized by the international press. In his November 6, 2017 The New Yorker article, Ronan Farrow described them as an "army of spies" who attempted to stifle stories about Harvey Weinstein's sexual assaults by seeking to discredit the women Weinstein attacked and the journalists who investigated his crimes. A lengthy June 2021 report in the Canadian newspaper, The Globe and Mail—one in a series of articles that were highly critical of its methods—detailed the many ways Black Cube agents worked to fabricate evidence against innocent civilians, including a Canadian judge and journalists. In August 2021, the podcast Darknet Diaries featured a first-hand account of Black Cube operatives targeting journalists and Citizen Lab staff member John Scott-Railton. In his 2021 publication, Spooked: The Trump Dossier, Black Cube, and the Rise of Private Spies, former investigative reporter with The New York Times, Barry Meier, described the "oversized impact" Black Cube and other private spies in their "murky world"—were "suddenly having on politics, business and our personal lives."

== Notable investigations and clients ==
=== Vincent Tchenguiz ===
The first case that brought Black Cube to the attention of the media was the legal dispute between Vincent Tchenguiz, a major donor to the Conservative Party (UK) and an investor in the SCL Group and the UK Serious Fraud Office (SFO). Tchenguiz first hired Black Cube in 2011, following his arrest on March 10, 2011, as part of the SFO investigation into the collapse of the Icelandic bank Kaupthing. and continued to use their services on a number of cases. Black Cube analysed the network of relationships surrounding the collapse of the bank, and helped build a successful challenge to the SFO arrests and search warrants, causing the judge to declare the SFO's actions unlawful in 2013. Tchenguiz's lawsuit against Black Cube, alleging fraudulent invoices, was dropped in an undisclosed settlement agreement.

=== Nochi Dankner ===
In 2014, Black Cube was hired by Israeli businessman Nochi Dankner, to examine a court decision assigning control of IDB Holding Corp. Ltd. to Motti Ben Moshe. Black Cube investigated the sources of capital of Ben Moshe, revealing an ongoing investigation by German regulatory authorities into Ben Moshe's company ExtraEnergy, and locating a witness who held evidence of money laundering and tax evasion by Ben Moshe.

=== Joseph Kabila ===
In 2019, the Israeli investigative television program Uvda (which airs on channel 12) released a report detailing how Dan Zorella had met with then-president of the Democratic Republic of the Congo, Joseph Kabila in 2015 to hire Black Cube for Operation Coltan, an operation to spy on Kabila's political opponents. Black Cube investigators rented out the entire floor of a hotel in Kinshasa to serve as a base of operations. Opposition figures expressed outrage at the revelations.

=== Nobu Su ===
In 2015, Black Cube assisted Taiwanese businessman Nobu Su, owner of the shipping company TMT, in his efforts to gain permission to appeal a 2014 judgement in favor of Lakatamia Shipping in which Su was found personally liable for the amount of almost $47m. Black Cube delivered intelligence to Su's legal team showing that 20% of the judgement amount was due to a company called Slagen Shipping, which had ceased operations at the time of the establishment of the claim, thereby rendering it unable to act as a claimant, both reducing the quantum of the judgement significantly, and causing the appeal to be granted.

=== Kfar Giladi Quarries ===
Black Cube was hired to assist Kfar Giladi Quarries in their highly publicized dispute with Caesarstone in Israel. Black Cube engaged a Caesarstone engineer in conversation during a group bicycle trip in Kfar Giladi. In the recording, the engineer contradicted the allegations that were made by Caesarstone in the arbitration proceeding with Kfar Giladi. After six years of deliberations, Judge Boaz Okun ordered Caesarstone to pay more than $14m as compensation to Kfar Giladi.

=== AmTrust Financial Services ===
In 2016, Black Cube was involved in exposing bribery and corruption in a set of Italian arbitrations between AmTrust and an Italian named Antonio Somma totaling €2bn. Somma admitted to the company's undercover agents that he could control the arbitration panels, and that he had an agreement to pay the chair of the arbitration panel 10% of any money they awarded him. Following Black Cube's findings, the arbitrator was dismissed and in July 2016, the two sides reached a settlement on the total of 60 million euros instead of the initial 2 billion euro claim.

=== Rami Levy Hashikma Marketing ===
In 2016, Black Cube was hired by Rami Levy, the owner of Rami Levy Chain Stores Hashikma Marketing who is considered a champion of low prices in Israel, to verify his suspicions that he was being targeted by a rival chain in a negative media campaign. Black Cube provided Levy with evidence that the PR agent who worked for Levy's competitor, Victory supermarket chain, exposed the negative campaign that they carried out aimed at damaging Levy's public reputation. Levy later used those materials in a lawsuit against his competitor.

=== Alstom and Afcon ===
In 2016, France's Alstom and its Israeli partner Afcon hired Black Cube to assist them with their dispute against the Israel Railways' electrification bid, which the Spanish company SEMI won. Black Cube presented recordings of officials from the Israel Railway discussing malfunctions that occurred in the bid. Based on these findings in January 2018, the Superior Court in Israel issued an agreement of compromise according to which the work on the railway will be divided between all three of the companies and that Black Cube's clients' work will be priced at 580 million NIS, after they originally lost the bid.

=== Harvey Weinstein ===
In 2017, Black Cube made headlines after it was revealed that in 2016 the film executive Harvey Weinstein had hired private investigators—including Kroll and Black Cube—with its highly trained "former Mossad agents"— in his efforts to suppress allegations by numerous women that he had sexually harassed or assaulted them. Weinstein was referred to the company by former Israeli Prime Minister Ehud Barak, who denied any personal connection with the company or its associates. In his July 2016 contract with Black Cube, Weinstein clarified that the explicit goal of the investigation was to stop the abuse allegations from surfacing. In his November 6, 2017 The New Yorker article, entitled "Harvey Weinstein’s Army of Spies", Ronan Farrow described in detail how Black Cube agents tracked and met journalists and actresses. They focused in particular on Rose McGowan, who later publicly accused Weinstein of rape. Over the course of a year, Black Cube and other agencies, "target, or collect information on, dozens of individuals, and compile psychological profiles that sometimes focused on their personal or sexual histories." One agent, Stella Penn Pechanac, used an alias to pose as a women's rights supporter interested in hiring McGowan for a formal dinner speech, enabling her to secretly record conversations with the actress. Black Cube apologized for taking the case in November 2017. As of 2019, Manhattan federal prosecutors investigating Weinstein were probing into the firm's activities on his behalf, and McGowan's separate racketeering suit against it remained active. During Weinstein's 2020 trial for assault in Manhattan, Black Cube's spying on behalf of Weinstein was entered into evidence in January. By 2021, McGowan's case had been dismissed by a federal judge, and federal prosecutors ultimately took no action against Black Cube. In the wake of the public fallout from the case, Black Cube changed its vetting procedure for prospective clients, introduced a more robust KYC system, and instituted a policy of reviewing potentially risky clients with its Board of Directors.

=== Gefen Biomed ===
In 2017, Gefen Biomed filed a NIS 60 million lawsuit which claims that entrepreneurs Moshe (Mori) Arkin and others deliberately misled or deceived minority shareholders in biomed company cCam Biotherapeutics. The lawsuit is based on evidence collected by Black Cube, which conducted recorded interviews with key figures in cCam that prove a deliberate and systematic attempt to conceal exit talks with Merck for up to $625 million.

=== Iran Nuclear Deal ===
In 2017 aides to U.S. President Donald Trump had contracted with Black Cube in order to undermine the Iran Nuclear Deal by discrediting former Obama administration officials Colin Kahl and Ben Rhodes. They looked for evidence of unsubstantiated and false claims that Kahl and Rhodes were being enriched by Iran lobbyists and that they were cheating on their spouses. The goal was to seek damaging information about former Obama administration officials and help the Trump administration undermine the Iran nuclear deal. Black Cube claimed in response that it had no relation to the Trump administration, to Trump aides, or to the Iran nuclear deal. In August 2018, The New Yorker connected Black Cube's research to a memo circulated in the Trump White House in early 2017 alleging former Obama officials 'conspired with reporters' "to undermine President Trump's foreign policy" in hopes of saving Obamacare and the Iran nuclear deal. In October 2018, Haaretz newspaper revealed that Black Cube's activities were aimed at tracking transfers of Iranian funds and assets in order to seize them, following US court rulings against Iran in favor of victims of terror attacks. Furthermore, it was published that the goal of the intelligence gathering was tracing unknown Iranian assets and revealing Obama's administration collaboration with Iran, in violation of US or international law, in order to find other possible parties to sue such as banks.

=== Project Maple Tree - Project Camouflage ===
In 2017, Toronto-based private equity firm Catalyst owned by Newton Glassman paid about $11 million (CAD) to Black Cube for an effort code-named 'Project Maple Tree' to "embarrass" and improperly discredit Ontario Justice Frank Newbould. Catalyst Capital Group and West Face Capital had been involved in a lengthy and multi-pronged legal battle after West Face acquired WIND Mobile, a Canadian wireless provider in 2014. In his August 18, 2016 Ontario Superior Court of Justice decision, Justice Newbould ruled against Catalyst in favor of West Face, and said that Catalyst's owner, Newton Glassman was "aggressive," "argumentative" and "considerably difficult." Justice Newbould awarded West Face $1,239,965, saying that Glassman was "certainly playing hardball attacking the reputation and honesty of West Face" because he had lost the opportunity to acquire Wind. In retaliation, Glassman hired Black Cube, to dispatch agents to discredit Newbould and West Face. Through this story, Black Cube received coverage in Canadian media.

=== Bank Hapoalim ===
In 2018, Black Cube was hired by Bank Hapoalim to trace the assets of Motti Zisser, who left behind a high debt to the bank. Black Cube provided intelligence of Zisser having a number of assets in Europe which were transferred from him to his son David through a sophisticated network of shell companies. As a result of the intelligence gathered by Black Cube, Bank Hapoalim was granted an injunction that applied an effective freeze on all the companies of the Zisser Family, which resulted in a settlement of the Zisser family returning 95 million NIS to the bank.

=== Viktor Orban's re-election ===
In 2017 and 2018, Black Cube supported Viktor Orban's re-election campaign gaining taped telephone conversations of individuals and NGO's associated with George Soros who was actively opposing Orban's re-election. Black Cube set up a cover company called Smart Innotech, seated in London, UK, and contacted Hungarian Migration Aid Hungary by email, urging them to have a meeting in Vienna, Austria. Migration Aid contacted the Hungarian foreign intelligence (Alkotmányvédelmi Hivatal) and recorded and tightly controlled the meetings. Black Cube attempted to collect data on migrants, and on Hungarian opposition party members, to uncover alleged ties with George Soros; which were proven to be false. Black Cube failed to gather any information; the company—which was never registered—disappeared after February. Black Cube used the same methods with multiple NGOs, like Open Society Foundations Hungary and the Hungarian Helsinki Committee. According to Tamar Zandberg, Hungary was “carrying out an anti-Semitic campaign against Soros”, and Benjamin Netanyahu, whose Likud party, she stated, has dangerous ties to "extreme right-wing parties in Europe", openly supported Orban's anti-Semitic re-election campaign. She stated that Black Cube's support for Orban is an "Israeli embarrassment."

=== Janio Lescure and Judge Oydén Ortega ===
In 2019, Black Cube uncovered proof of bribery and corruption between lawyer Janio Lescure of Panama and various judges and magistrates in the country, including Judge Oydén Ortega of the Supreme Court. Black Cube agents posed as Russian businessmen looking for shady business opportunities in Panama. There recorded audio of Lescure admitting his close relationships with judges, state officials, and mafiosos as well as his ability to control court verdicts, bypass inspections of illegal activities, and avoiding paying taxes.

=== NSO Group ===
In October 2018, Associated Press reported that two University of Toronto cybersecurity researchers were being pursued by undercover operatives with false identities who were inquiring about the researchers' work concerning the Israeli spyware company NSO Group. The operatives also appeared to be trying to goad the researchers into making anti-Semitic or otherwise damaging remarks. After a sting operation organised by one of the researchers and the AP, one operative was photographed and later identified as a former Israeli security official who had previously worked on a case linked to Black Cube. Responding to the revelation, NSO Group denied contracting Black Cube, and Black Cube likewise denied involvement.

In February 2019, Associated Press reported that at least four more individuals - three lawyers, and one journalist - were pursued by undercover operatives for their work on NSO. Undercover agents again tried to goad the individuals into making racist or anti-Israel remarks. Channel 12, an Israeli television channel, obtained and aired the secret recordings made by the undercover operatives shortly before the AP published the revelations. Channel 12 confirmed that Black Cube undercover investigators were involved, and claimed the individuals being investigated by Black Cube were attempting to smear NSO Group on behalf of Qatar. At the time, Black Cube declined to comment besides a generic reply that it follows the law in all jurisdictions it operates in.

An April 2022 article in The New Yorker included more denials from both NSO and Black Cube but included a quote from NSO chief Hulio Shalev that contradicted those denials: “NSO Group has denied hiring Black Cube to target opponents. However, Hulio acknowledged the connection to me, saying, “For the lawsuit in Cyprus, there was one involvement of Black Cube,” because the lawsuit “came from nowhere, and I want to understand.” Black Cube denied involvement in the case in the same article.

=== Eliezer Fishman ===
In 2019, Black Cube exposed Eliezer Fishman's hidden assets valued at around €100 million. Fishman, once considered one of Israel's wealthiest businessmen, was declared bankrupt in 2016. Black Cube operatives, posing as business associates of an oligarch under threat of bankruptcy and in need of hiding significant funds, secretly recorded several meetings with associates of Fishman, which led the London High Court to rule that the businessman had illicitly hidden assets and properties across Europe, mainly Germany, through legal entities, trustees, and representatives and led the High court to order one of Fishman's straw-women to transfer ‘all her powers, rights and interests in East-West UK’ to Fishman's receiver.

=== Beny Steinmetz ===
In May 2020, Black Cube submitted on behalf of Beny Steinmetz evidence to a New York court that the Brazilian company Vale SA withheld critical information concerning a mining license in Guinea obtained by Steinmetz. During a four-month operation, Black Cube gathered recordings with Vale senior executives, who admitted that Vale assumed the mining license was obtained illegally when they entered into the contract, contradicting an arbitration award of $1.8 billion in favor of Vale. As a result, in February 2022 Vale dropped its lawsuit against Steinmetz seeking to enforce the award.

=== Petróleos Mexicanos ===
In October 2019, it was revealed that Black Cube recorded evidence of bribery and corruption of senior officials at Mexico's Petróleos Mexicanos, known as Pemex. The recordings were submitted as part of a lawsuit filed in 2018 by Oro Negro, a Mexican oil-field drilling company, claiming that Pemex drove Oro Negro into bankruptcy when the company refused to pay bribes. Black Cube recordings offer evidence of long-standing corruption in Mexico's largest state enterprise, in all levels of Pemex management up to the CEO and board. This evidence was additionally presented to the DOJ in their investigation into Pemex.

=== Mediterranean Oil Spill ===
In February 2021, an oil spill washed up tar along 160 km of Israel's Mediterranean coast, resulting in beach closures across the country. The Israeli Environmental Protection Ministry declared it Israel's worst environmental disaster in its history. Officials estimated that more than 1000 tons of oil had been spilled. The source was unknown, with no ship providing warning of the spill or reporting it. Black Cube, in cooperation with the Israeli environment minister, undertook an investigation on a pro-bono basis and concluded that the ship responsible is owned by the Syrian Malah family via a complex structure of shell companies. The ship is suspected to have been illegally transporting oil from Iran to Syria. Both Israel and the chairman of the compensation fund agreed that the oil was apparently dumped into the sea on purpose during the cleaning out of oil barrels on board, according to a ministry statement.

The tanker was insured by UAE-based Islamic P&I club, which “is solely used by Iranian ship owners that cannot find cover elsewhere” according to Lloyd's List. With support from Black Cube's evidence, The London-based International Oil Pollution Compensation Fund agreed to pay damages, as it does in cases where suits against a ship's owner are “unlikely to bear fruit.”

=== Medista ===
In 2023, Black Cube was hired by a medical supply company, Medista, to investigate the premature termination of their contract with the Belgian Health Ministry and uncover evidence of collusion between their competitors Movianto and the Belgian government. Medista, claiming that they were unfairly targeted, hired the ex-Mossad spy firm to conduct a series of secret meetings in an attempt to collect evidence to prove that the contracts had been unlawfully awarded to Movianto. Video footage of the meetings between the health official and Black Cube agents, published in the Belgian Media, reveal how she colluded with their competitors, Movianto, to secure covid-era contracts worth €50 million, issued by the Belgian administration.

Another video recorded by Black Cube showed a manager of Movianto boasting about winning the tender thanks to his “personal contact with the people in charge”. After publication of the video, an internal probe by Belgium's Federal Internal Audit agency was launched into the tender process. The probe found that the civil servant had made improper disclosures about the award process and failed to adequately protect Medista's trade secrets.

=== Whaling in Iceland ===
In 2024 Black Cube revealed corruption in the whaling industry in Iceland, one of the remaining 3 countries in the world where whaling is still legal. In October 2024 Black Cube was hired by an international environmental organization. Black Cube's agent, posing as a wealthy investor interested in buying property in Iceland, recorded his conversations with Gunnar Bergmann, a former chairman of the Minke Whalers’ Association and the son of Jón Gunnarsson, a member of parliament and minister for the Independence Party. Bergmann described a corrupt deal made by his father with Prime Minister and Independence Party chairman Bjarni Benediktsson to circumvent public opposition and grant whaling licenses to Kristján Loftsson CEO and principal owner of Icelandic investment powerhouse Hvalur hf., one of the richest men in Iceland and a notorious whaler. It was subsequently announced by Benediktsson that Gunnarsson would not be involved in the process of granting whaling licenses

Bergmann detailed the politics and interests behind the deal, explaining how his father was being compensated for the loss of a prominent party position by receiving a position within the Ministry of Fisheries and Agriculture with the power to grant the whaling license. Bergmann went on to explain that the Prime Minister himself couldn't take the power to issue the license because of personal connections to Loftsson which would be called to attention. Bergmann described his own family connections to Loftsson and explained how his own family was going to benefit and offered the 'investor' assistance in gaining access to prominent political representatives.

=== Evolution ===
In August 2025 Black Cube submitted an affidavit and several videos to a New Jersey court revealing that Swedish-based Evolution AB, which specializes in live online gambling, was operating in markets where online gambling is illegal ("Black Markets") and in sanctioned countries. According to the affidavit, part of a long spanning defamation litigation between a New Jersey law firm and Evolution AB, Black Cube agents posed as businessmen looking to establish online casinos or investors in the gambling sector when they approached current and former Evolution executives.

In one video, an executive showed Black Cube agents evidence of revenue generated in Sudan going back to 2016, when the country was designated by the US as a state sponsor of terrorism. He also stated that the company has players in Syria, including the family of Syrian president Bashar al-Assad, who has been under US sanctions since 2011. In another video, a former executive describes how Evolution used third party services to sell its games in countries such as China, South Korea, Malaysia and Thailand where online gambling is illegal. Additional videos show Black Cube agents located physically in houses in Iran and Syria, playing and withdrawing winnings from Evolution games, including as recently as May 2025.

=== Cyprus ===
In April 2026, Black Cube confirmed that it had been involved in a sting operation targeting state officials and private interests in Cyprus that exposed a corruption ring trading political donations for access, assistance, and investment tenders. The videos, published in January 2026, showed variously a senior aide to President Nikos Christodulides, a former government minster, and the CEO of Cyfield Group discussing how to secure access to the government through cash political donations that circumvented local election campaign finance laws. The videos also revealed that a social fund to assist students from disadvantaged backgrounds that was managed by the president's wife had been used for disguising campaign donations. As a result of the videos, the President's wife resigned from this position, as did the President's chief of staff, Charalambos Charalambous.

== Controversies ==
=== Laura Codruța Kövesi ===
In April 2016, two of the company employees were arrested, and later convicted, in Bucharest on suspicions of spying, phishing, and cyberharassing the chief prosecutor of the Romanian National Anticorruption Directorate, Laura Codruța Kövesi, and people close to her. After sentencing, the company reached an understanding with the Romanian authorities and the two employees were released and returned to Israel after a few months. At the time of the arrest, Black Cube denied any wrongdoing, saying that they were working under contract from the highest political powers in Bucharest and that "all of Black Cube’s employees follow local law to the letter, and the allegations against them are unfounded and untrue".

=== Russia probe ===
On 5 April 2019 the Senate Intelligence Committee sent a letter to Walter Soriano, the owner of USG Security Limited based in Britain and Israel, requesting his communications with Paul Manafort, Michael Flynn, Psy-Group, Wikistrat, Orbis Business Intelligence (a firm co-founded by Christopher Steele), and Black Cube. In response, the company denied any connection and stated that “neither they nor anyone acting on their behalf has ever had any communication or collaboration with Walter Soriano or anyone on his behalf."

=== Pre-election leaks in Slovenia ===
A few weeks before the Slovenian general election on 22 March 2026, a website appeared in which several Slovenian politicians are accused of corruption. The website featured audio recordings and secretly filmed videos in which several people linked to the government of Robert Golob appear to be bragging about their political connections to people representing themselves as foreign businesspeople. Investigative journalists claim that representatives of Black Cube met with Slovenian opposition leader Janez Janša and collaborated on pre-election revelations targeting public figures. Slovenian intelligence agency SOVA established that in December 2025, the representatives of the agency, including Dan Zorella, visited the address Trstenjakova ulica 8, the location of the headquarters of the Slovenian Democratic Party. In March, the government stated that SOVA found reasonable grounds to suspect that a criminal offense subject to ex officio prosecution has been committed, and therefore notified the prosecutor’s office and police leadership of its findings. As of October, the Slovenian parliament has declined to launch a parliamentary inquiry. Black Cube has maintained that it works in accordance with the law, and that uncovering corruption is a regular part of its work.

== International Advisory Board ==
- Meir Dagan (Deceased) – Former head of Mossad, Honorary President of the Board.
- Efraim Halevy – Former head of Mossad, headed the National Security Council and the Hebrew University Center for Strategic Studies.
- Yohanan Danino – Former Israeli Police Commissioner, served as Chairman of Migdal Insurance Group.
- Major General Giora Eiland – Former head of the Israeli National Security Council, headed the IDF's Operation Branch and IDF's Planning Branch.
- Professor Asher Tishler – President of the College of Management Academic Studies
- Brigadier General Mati Leshem – Recipient of the 1997 Israel Defense Prize
- Paul Reyniers – Former partner at Price Waterhouse and author of GARP (Generally Accepted Risk Principles)
- Itiel Maayan – Member of Microsoft's Customer Advisory Board
- Lieutenant Colonel Golan Malka – Former Vice President Marketing and Business Development of NICE Systems

== Sources ==
- Meier, Barry (18 May 2021). Spooked: The Trump Dossier, Black Cube, and the Rise of Private Spies. Harper. ISBN 978-0062950680.
