= Mercenaries in Africa after 1960 =

Robert C. MacKenzie (right), who volunteered for service with the Rhodesian military. Such volunteers were often labelled as mercenaries.

Mercenaries have played a vital role in the modern history of Africa since the 1960s. Broadly the mercenary actions can be broken into two types of related actors, which can then be examined regionally. Mercenaries have been used by Western governments to influence conflicts and/or support or attack African governments and political factions. This is mainly done to maintain spheres of influence, and create friendly governments. This was most prevalent during the Cold War era, but continues to this day, notably with the Russian Wagner Group.

The second group of actions are mercenaries working on behalf of large multinational corporations, helping to secure resource extraction areas. Oftentimes the support of mercenary groups to keep a leader or government in power comes at a large cost, that the government is unable to pay, who then offers the mercenary company rights to resource extraction areas such as diamond mines, oil fields or other valuable natural resource to pay for the services of the mercenary company. This has notably happened in Sierra Leone.

Legislation has been adopted by the OAU (Organization for African Unity) as well as the IRCC (International Red Cross Committee), and various African governments (notably South Africa) to attempt to regulate or ban the use and creation of mercenary companies. This legislation has been mostly unsuccessful largely because world powers such as the United States and Russia continue to condone the use of mercenaries as a tool of state craft. Many modern scholars consider the use of mercenaries in Africa to be a form of neocolonialism.

== Mercenaries and foreign actors ==
=== Mercenaries as actors for former colonial powers ===
During and directly after the African independence movement, foreign nations used mercenaries to influence the civil wars and violence in the newly created states. This group of mercenaries assisted the rise of leaders who were friendly to the previously colonizing nation. These mercenaries can be considered an extension of the armed forces of the colonizing nation, able to operate with a thin veneer of deniability due to them not being members of any nation's official military. Foreign mercenaries were most prominently utilized in conflicts such as the Congo Crisis, Rhodesian Bush War, Angolan Civil War and South African Border War. These mercenaries were seen as a vital way to keep former colonies in the sphere of influence of the former colonizing power, and to ensure that the economic interests of the former power continued to be served by the newly independent state. The strategies employed by these groups included training and fomenting rebels, carrying out coups d'état, defending unpopular leaders, and political intimidation.

Dutch mercenaries in the Congo were involved in the secessionist movement of the Katanga Province directly after the Congo became independent from Belgium in 1960. The Katanga province was the site of large mineral wealth, and the Belgian government had a continued interest in accessing those resources. As such, Belgian mercenaries provided assistance to the Katangan secessionists, and were involved in the execution of Patrice Lumumba in 1961. These efforts were relatively successful in that Joseph Mobutu became the leader of the Congo, and he would continue to provide access to the Katangan mines to the Belgian corporations that operated in the province.

=== Mercenaries as Cold War actors ===
The second group of mercenaries are those that were employed by Cold War actors, most significantly the United States and Soviet Union. These mercenaries were not deployed due to economic concerns but instead for ideological reasons, most often the fight against or for communism. The United States and its allies used mercenaries to support right-wing political factions in Africa as part of a global fight against communism (see Operation Condor). These mercenaries were often ideological radicals who had come to have a deep hatred for Marxism. There was a large group of Cubans and Cuban Americans who joined these efforts, after having fled the Cuban Revolution. The use of mercenaries allowed the United States government to maintain an official stance of neutrality and respect for self-determination while still being heavily involved in the creation and maintenance of right-wing dictatorships in many of these new states. These mercenaries also allowed the U.S. government to provide support for the apartheid-era South African military while the government of South Africa was under international sanctions and embargoes.

The Angolan and Mozambican wars of liberation saw the involvement of large groups of foreign mercenaries. The CIA and South African support for UNITA and the FNLA was kept relatively covert, which relied on the use of mercenaries, and shipments of large amounts of weapons and other armament material. South African mercenaries, Cuban exile mercenaries, and American mercenaries all played a role, fighting against the left aligned MPLA, and helping to prop up Jonas Savimbi's regime. The conflict came to be a proxy war between the Western bloc and the Eastern bloc, with the USSR and Cuba mainly supporting the MPLA and the US and South Africa supporting UNITA and Jonas Savimbi.

=== Mercenaries and multinational corporations ===
In the more modern era mercenary action is deeply involved with control and extraction of resources in Africa, especially with valuable natural resources such as oil, gems, and other precious minerals. The general business model is to protect the resource rich areas in exchange for the rights to extract them. This is usually done with the help of multiple corporations.

This exact business model was implemented in Sierra Leone in the 1990s. With the start of the Sierra Leonean Civil War in 1994, the rebels quickly captured the most important economic areas of the state, the mining areas. In order to protect the government in Freetown, the capital, and regain control of the country, the National Provisional Ruling Council (NPRC) government hired Executive Outcomes Ltd in March 1995. They were paid US$1.25 million a month, and the NPRC granted large mining concessions to Branch Energy, a mining company that is partially owned by Executive Outcomes Ltd. The cost of maintaining Executive Outcomes soon became too much for the NPRC government, and in February 1997, they left.

In the vacuum of force that occurred after this, the NPRC government was quickly overthrown by a coalition of the military and the Revolutionary United Front (RUF). In order to restore the government, the Sandline International Corporation was hired, paid for by the businessman Rakesh Saxena, who had a controlling interest in the company Diamond Works of Vancouver, which had bought Branch Energy. In exchange for restoring the constitution, the Branch Energy company would be entitled to major mining concessions in Sierra Leone, and exempt from a law prohibiting the operation of mining companies without at least a 25% ownership by a Sierra Leonian citizen.

== Legality of mercenary actions ==
Mercenaries are banned by the 2001 United Nations Mercenary Convention, but many nations, notably the United States, France, South Africa, the United Kingdom, China and Russia have not ratified or signed it, and nations such as Belgium and others have signed with reservations, which significantly weakened the treaty. Many African nations have banned the deployment of mercenaries within their borders, but lack the ability to enforce such laws. Many of the former colonizing powers, have used mercenaries as a tool for state interference.

This has changed somewhat with the corporatization of mercenaries, with legislation that legalizes their activity, as long as they operate only in the interests of the nation where they are based.

== See also ==
- Mercenaries from ex-USSR in Africa

== Works cited ==
- Bosch, Shannon, and Marelie Maritz. “South African Private Security Contractors Active in Armed Conflicts: Citizenship, Prosecution and the Right to Work.” Potchefstroom Electronic Law Journal, vol. 14, no. 7, 2017, pp. 70–125., https://doi.org/10.17159/1727-3781/2011/v14i7a2618.
- Churchill, Ward. U.S. Mercenaries in Southern Africa: The Recruiting Network and U.S. Policy. Indiana University Press, 1980.
- Francis, David J. “Mercenary Intervention in Sierra Leone: Providing National Security or International Exploitation?” Third World Quarterly, vol. 20, no. 2, Apr. 1999, pp. 319–338., https://doi.org/10.1080/01436599913785.
- Hughes, Geraint. “Soldiers of Misfortune: The Angolan Civil War, the British Mercenary Intervention, and UK Policy towards Southern Africa, 1975–6.” The International History Review, vol. 36, no. 3, 2014, pp. 493–512., https://doi.org/10.1080/07075332.2013.836120.
- Michaud, Paul. “No More Mercenaries.” New African, Oct. 2003, pp. 29–29.
- Rookes, Stephen, and Walter Bruyère-Ostells. “Mercenaries in the Congo and Biafra, 1960-1970: Africa's Weapon of Choice?” Small Wars & Insurgencies, vol. 33, no. 1–2, 2021, pp. 112–129., https://doi.org/10.1080/09592318.2021.1957535.
- Troianovski, Anton. “Russian Filmmakers Killed in Africa Were Investigating Mercenaries Close to the Kremlin.” Washington Post, 1 Aug. 2018.
- Heinz, G., and H. Donnay. Lumumba: The Last Fifty Days. New York: Grove, 1970.
