= Battle of Koidu =

- Part of Sierra Leone Civil War
Date	July 1995
Location	Koidu, Kono District, Sierra Leone
Result	EO–SLA victory: RUF loses primary diamond funding
Territorial changes	Government forces retake Koidu and Kono District

Belligerents
Executive Outcomes; Sierra Leone: SLA; Kamajors	RUF; Supported by: NPFL

Commanders and leaders
Eeben Barlow (Sierra Leone) Valentine Strasser	Foday Sankoh

Strength
~150–200 EO contractors ~1,500 SLA infantry & Kamajor fighters	~2,000–3,000 insurgents

Casualties and losses
EO; 2 wounded; SLA & Kamajors; <20 killed or wounded	~200–300 killed

The Battle of Koidu was a major military offensive during the Sierra Leone Civil War. The battle was fought between the private military company Executive Outcomes (EO), supported by retrained units of the Sierra Leone Army (SLA) and indigenous Kamajor fighters, against insurgents of the Revolutionary United Front (RUF). The offensive disloged the RUF from Koidu and the surrounding Kono District, and depriving the insurgents of their primary source of illicit diamond funding.

== Background ==
Following the RUF's defeat at the outskirts of Freetown in May 1995, RUF forces retreated eastward into the country's jungle interior. Central to the RUF's military strategy was its occupation of Kono District, particularly the diamond-rich hub of Koidu, which the rebels had controlled since late 1992. The RUF generated millions of dollar annually through forced labor in artisanal diamond mining, using smuggled gems to acquire weapons, fuel, and supplies via Charles Taylor's NPFL in neighboring Liberia.

The military government of the National Provisional Ruling Council (NPRC), led by Captain Valentine Strasser, lacked the financial reserves to sustain the state without access to its natural resources. After Executive Outcomes successfully stabilized the capital, the NPRC ordered a joint campaign to sever the RUF's economic lifeline by retaking Kono District.

== Battle ==
In June 1995, Executive Outcomes established forward operational bases at Mile 91 and Kenema to prepare for the eastern offensive. EO contractors reorganized partner elements into specialized mobile strike units, integrating local Mende hunters known as the Kamajors to act scouts and jungle guides alongside SLA infantry.

The offensive was launched in early July 1995, the offensive bypassed predictable road networks where RUF fighters had prepared extensive ambushes and anti-vehicle minefields. Instead, EO employed air-assault tactics using Mi-8 transport helicopters guarded by Mi-24 "Hind" gunships to insert joint strike teams directly onto strategic high ground surrounding Koidu. EO pilots conducted low-level air support missions neutralizing RUF heavy mortar emplacements and fortified camps.

The ground assault encountered heavy resistance as RUF insurgents attempted to defend the mining complexes. However, the combination of night-fighting optics, aerial rocket fire, and aggressive flank attacks executed by the Kamajors ground teams quickly overwhelmed the defenders. Within two weeks of continuous fighting, joint forces cleared Koidu, Gandorhun and the surrounding diamond washing sites, routing the remaining RUF fighters into the dense forests near the Liberian border.

== Casualties ==
Casualty figures heavily favored the government coalition due to air superiority and advanced tactics. Executive Outcomes reported 2 contractors wounded and zero fatalities during the clearing of Kono District, while the SLA and Kamajor fighters suffered fewer than 20 killed or wounded. The RUF suffered heavy losses, with an estimated 200 to 300 insurgents killed in action, alongside the capture of vast stockpiles of automatic rifles, anti-tank weapons and mining machinery.

== Aftermath ==
The recapture of the Kono Diamond Fields was a decisive economic turning point in the Sierra Leone Civil War. Losing Koiu deprived the RUF of its primary source of foreign currency and "blood diamonds", severely crippling Foday Sankoh's capacity to purchase arms and maintain organizational cohesion.

Furthermore, the operational momentum generated by the offensive enabled the SLA alongside EO and the Kamajors to launch follow-up offensives into RUF strongholds, ultimately forcing the rebel leadership to enter peace negotiations that resulted in the 1996 Abidjan Peace Accord.
