= 2015 West African offensive =

Coalition offensive against Boko Haram

- Part of the Boko Haram insurgency
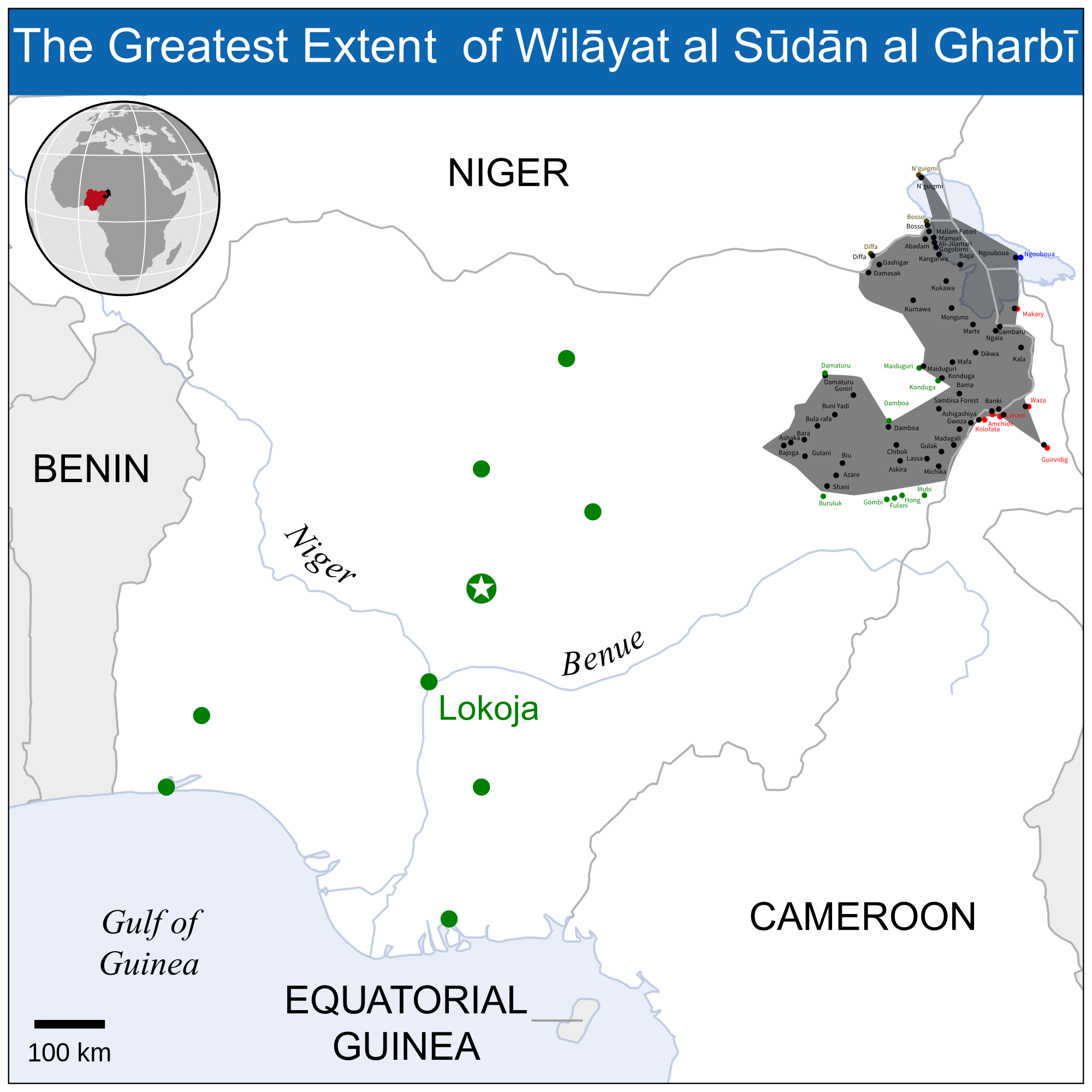
- Boko Haram's territorial control prior to the offensive.
Date	23 January – 24 December 2015 (11 months and 1 day)
Location	Northeast Nigeria, Northern Cameroon, Southeast Niger, Western Chad
Result	Multinational Joint Task Force victory

Belligerents
Multinational Joint Task Force; Nigeria; Cameroon; Chad; Niger; Local militias; STTEP (foreign mercenaries)	(Islamic State) Boko Haram (until March 2015); (Islamic State) ISIL; (Islamic State) Wilayat Gharb Afriqiya (from March 2015)

Commanders and leaders
(Nigeria) Muhammadu Buhari (from May 2015); (Nigeria) Goodluck Jonathan (until May 2015); (Nigeria) Kashim Shettima; (Nigeria) Isa Yuguda (until May 2015); (Nigeria) Lamidi Adeosun; (Nigeria) Eeben Barlow; (Cameroon) Paul Biya; (Chad) Idriss Déby; (Niger) Mahamadou Issoufou	(Islamic State) Abubakar Shekau (Islamic State) Abu Musab al-Barnawi

Strength
Nigerian Army: 130,000 active frontline personnel; 32,000 active reserve personnel; Nigeria Police Force: 371,800 officers; Multinational Joint Task Force: 7,500 active personnel (excluding Cameroon and Nigeria); Cameroonian Armed Forces: 20,000 active personnel; United States: 300 advisers	ISIL: 7,000–10,000

Starting in late January 2015, a coalition of West African troops launched an offensive against the Boko Haram insurgents in Nigeria.

== Background ==
The insurgent group Boko Haram was founded by the Muslim cleric Mohammed Yusuf in 2002. Initially, Yusuf rejected Western-style education in Nigeria. Professor Paul Lubeck who studies on African Muslim societies claims Yusuf viewed Western-style education should be "mediated through Islamic scholarship". Boko Haram remained peaceful before 2009; Yusuf criticised the northern Muslims for participating in what he considered a non-Islamic and illegitimate state. Due to police brutality and the years-ongoing inter-religious violence between Christians and Muslims the group radicalised itself with ideas to overthrew the Nigerian government and establish an Islamic state with the sharia as law. On 26 July 2009 Boko Haram launched an armed uprising in the Bauchi state under leading Yusuf's command. It later spread into the Yobe, Kano and Borno states. They attacked a police station in Maiduguri. After a five-day uprising, the police and the Nigerian Army crushed and suppressed the group. The incident killed between at least 700 and 800 people; Soon after the uprising, a crackdown by the Nigerian Army followed; Yusuf and some of his men were arrested on the 30th after soldiers stormed into their school and mosque. They were later executed on television. This was criticised by human rights' organisations and described as an extrajudicial execution.

One of his men, his successor and deputy Abubakar Shekau, was believed to be dead after he was shot in the 2009 uprising. In a July 2010, however, he appeared in a videotaped interview where he confirmed he was alive and claimed to be the leader of Boko Haram. Throughout the early 2010s, Boko Haram had steadily gained influence and launched increasingly deadly campaigns. The group began to seize territory aggressively in late 2014, declaring northeast Nigeria to be a caliphate under their control. By the end of 2014, Boko Haram controlled an area roughly the size of Belgium. In 2014, the group killed an estimated 10,000 people, mostly in northeast Nigeria. Through April, Boko Haram forces killed around 2,000 people in 2015. More than 1.5 million people were displaced by Boko Haram activities. In addition to killing raids, the group has regularly organized mass kidnappings. In April 2014, the group drew international attention by kidnapping 276 schoolgirls in Chibok. In total, the group seized around 2,000 women and girls in 2014. Boko Haram has been called one of the world's deadliest terrorist groups.

== The offensive ==
On 23 January 2015, it was disclosed that Nigerian troops were in final preparations for a major offensive against Boko Haram insurgents in North Eastern Nigeria. According to leaked security information, the final straw that prompted action was a Boko Haram video claiming that it had stockpiled "enough weapons to take on Nigeria and its neighbours". The video also prompted Cameroon, Chad, and Niger to acknowledge the threat of growing Boko Haram power and pledge military support for the operation. The goal of the campaign was to eliminate "safe havens and escape routes of terrorists in or out of Nigeria" and provide "once and for all comprehensive operations" to eliminate the Boko Haram threat. Originally, the operation was expected to be complete before the planned February 14 elections.

A few days later, operations commenced. On 4 February after days of airstrikes, Chadian forces entered Boko Haram held Gamboru, Nigeria. An estimated 200 Boko Haram insurgents were killed in the offensive. Chadian losses were 9 killed and 21 wounded. Commander Ahmat Dari remarked "We have routed this band of terrorists" and vowed to "hunt them down everywhere." Boko Haram responded the next day by raiding nearby Fotokol, Cameroon. The fighting left 81 civilians, 13 Chadian soldiers, and 6 Cameroonian soldiers dead. However, eyewitness also reported Boko Haram took heavy casualties leaving dead insurgents "everywhere". Boko Haram reportedly burned the town's mosque and indiscriminately slit civilians' throats.

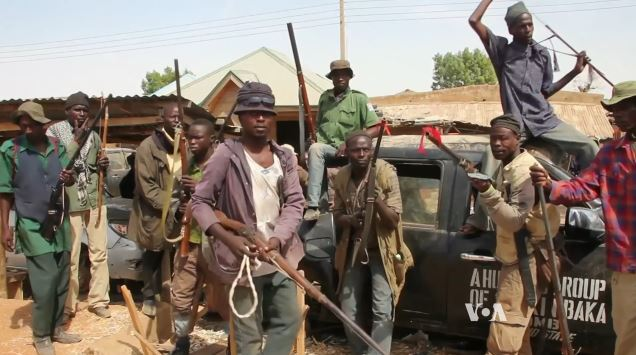
Civilian Joint Task Force militiamen in southeastern Borno State, February 2015

By 6 February, Chadian and Nigerian warplanes and ground troops had forced Boko Haram forces to abandon about a dozen towns and villages. The French military also aided in the offensive by providing reconnaissance flights. In response, Boko Haram attacked two villages in Nigeria and another in Cameroon, killing more than 100 civilians. In a battle on 6 February, an estimated 100 insurgents, several military personnel, and one civilian were killed. On 7 February, Nigeria announced that the elections would be postponed for six weeks, citing unsafe voting conditions in the northeast. A small protest was held in response to the announcement with police preventing protesters from entering the electoral commission headquarters.

An agreement to provide 7,500 African Union Troops from Chad, Cameroon, Benin and Niger for the operation was tentatively reached on 7 February. On 17 February, the Nigerian military retook Monguno in a coordinated air and ground assault. Also on 17 February, Chadian forces began an attack on the Kala/Balge district of Nigeria aimed at capturing the strategic town of Dikwa. Boko Haram suffered heavy casualties and Dikwa fell by February 24. As troops approached the Sambisa Forest, Boko Haram launched a series of retaliatory raids. Gunmen shot and stabbed civilians and burned homes, apparently targeting Shuwa tribesmen – the same ethnicity of most Chadian soldiers.

During the week of 15 February, more than 300 Boko Haram fighters were killed by Nigerian forces as eleven more towns were recaptured. Various weapon stockpiles were seized or destroyed, and additional insurgents were arrested. Two Nigerian soldiers were killed in the fighting and ten others injured. Boko Haram leader Abubakar Shekau promised to disrupt the elections, then scheduled for March 28, in retaliation. Separately, an apparently errant bombing mission killed 37 mourners attending a funeral in Abadam, Niger. On 28 February, a large rally was held in the Cameroonian capital of Yaounde in support of the Central African forces fighting Boko Haram. An estimated 5,000 people marched through the street of the capital.

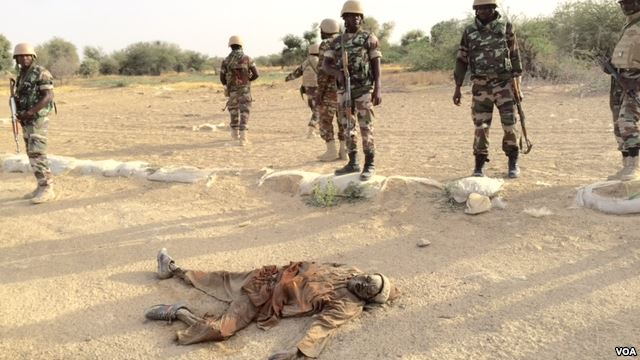
Niger Army soldiers with a killed Boko Haram fighter in Diffa, March 2015

On 6 March, the African Union officially endorsed sending 8,000 troops to help secure the Nigerian border, but declined to allow the troops to enter Nigeria. As Boko Haram continued to lose territory, the group pledged allegiance to the Islamic State of Iraq and the Levant on 7 March. Nigerian army spokesperson Sami Usman Kukasheka said the pledge was a sign of weakness and that Shekau was like a "drowning man". That same day, Boko Haram launched an attack against Maiduguri, a former stronghold of the group. The attack, which including suicide bombings, left more than 50 people dead. A fresh offensive against Boko Haram by a coalition of Chadian, Cameroonian, and Nigerian forces began on March 8 after a series of air strikes the previous two days. On March 16, the Nigerian army recaptured Bama.

On 24 March 2015, residents of Damasak, Nigeria said that Boko Haram had taken more than 400 women and children from the town as they fled from coalition forces earlier in the month. On 27 March, the Nigerian army captured Gwoza, which was believed to be the location of Boko Haram headquarters. According to the army, the victory meant that "virtually all" of Boko Haram's territory had been recaptured a day before the elections. Ahead of the attack, Boko Haram reportedly executed all of the town's citizens unable or unwilling to help defend it against the military's advance. BBC analyst Tomi Oladipo called the victory a major milestone for Nigeria. Boko Haram had held the town since August 2014 when Nigerian troops abandoned the city. The victory came days after Chad President Idriss Deby criticized Nigerian forces for not pulling their weight in the fight against Boko Haram.

On election day, Boko Haram militants killed 41 people, including a legislator, in an effort to disrupt voting. After Muhammadu Buhari defeated incumbent president Goodluck Jonathan in the election, the fight against Boko Haram continued. (Jonathan remained in power until 29 May.) On 8 April, a summit of Central and West African leaders was held with the aim of fine tuning strategy in order to "eradicate" the insurgency group. Ahead of the summit, a Chadian army spokesperson called Boko Haram's capacity to cause problems severely reduced. However, Nigeria said the group continued to wage an "asymmetric war" through the use of suicide bombers and guerilla tactics. The United Nations' Human Rights Council unanimously adopted a resolution calling for greater international support of the counter-insurgency campaign.

=== Hostage rescues ===
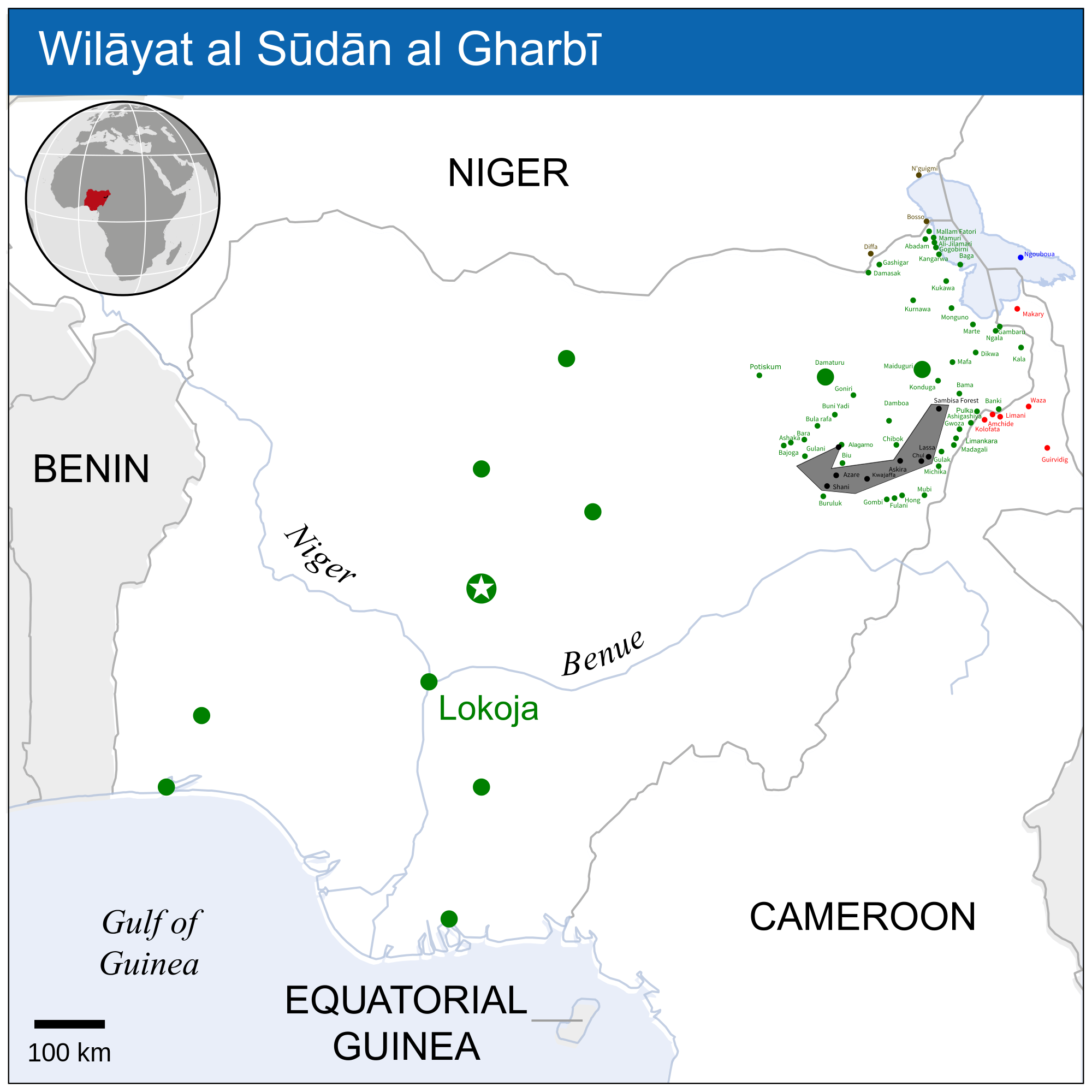
Map of Boko Haram's territorial control by April 2015, over 2 months after the start of the offensive

On 22 April, the Nigerian military began to push into the Sambisa Forest, a dense forest covering 23,000 square miles. The area is considered very difficult to navigate by people unfamiliar with the terrain and had long been considered the launching point of many Boko Haram attacks and likely hiding point of villagers taken hostage. It was considered the last stronghold of Boko Haram. A government spokesman said a top Boko Haram commander was killed in the initial push. Frank Charnas, a political analyst familiar with the region, said the move signaled the end of Boko Haram as a military force. "They really are fighting what appears to be their last battle", he added. "It does represent quite a significant step on behalf of the Nigerian military because up until now they have not gone into the Sambisa Forest and have also been pretty poor at taking the offensive to Boko." The Nigerian military had to retreat after encountering landmines and booby traps that killed three vigilantes working with the military, but continued its push after regrouping.

On 25 April, Boko Haram launched a counterattack on an island in Lake Chad. Forty-six Nigerian soldiers and 28 civilians were killed in the attack. After the attack, Niger recommended that the island of Lake Chad be evacuated. By early May, more than 5,000 people had left the island towns and reached N'guigmi, Niger by foot. An additional 11,500 evacuees were expected.

A fresh push into Sambisa Forest by Nigerian forces began on 27 April. As the Nigerian army advanced into the forest, it began to free a large number of women and children held as hostages by Boko Haram. On April 28, just under 300 hostages were freed. It is unclear if the freed prisoners were captured in Boko Haram raids or if they were area residents. A battle on April 29 killed over 400 Boko Haram insurgents, while freeing an undisclosed number of female captives. One soldier was killed and four seriously injured in the battle. One woman was killed and eight injured. On 30 April, another 234 women and children were freed from Boko Haram captivity as the military destroyed 13 Boko Haram camps. In total, close to 700 hostages had been rescued.

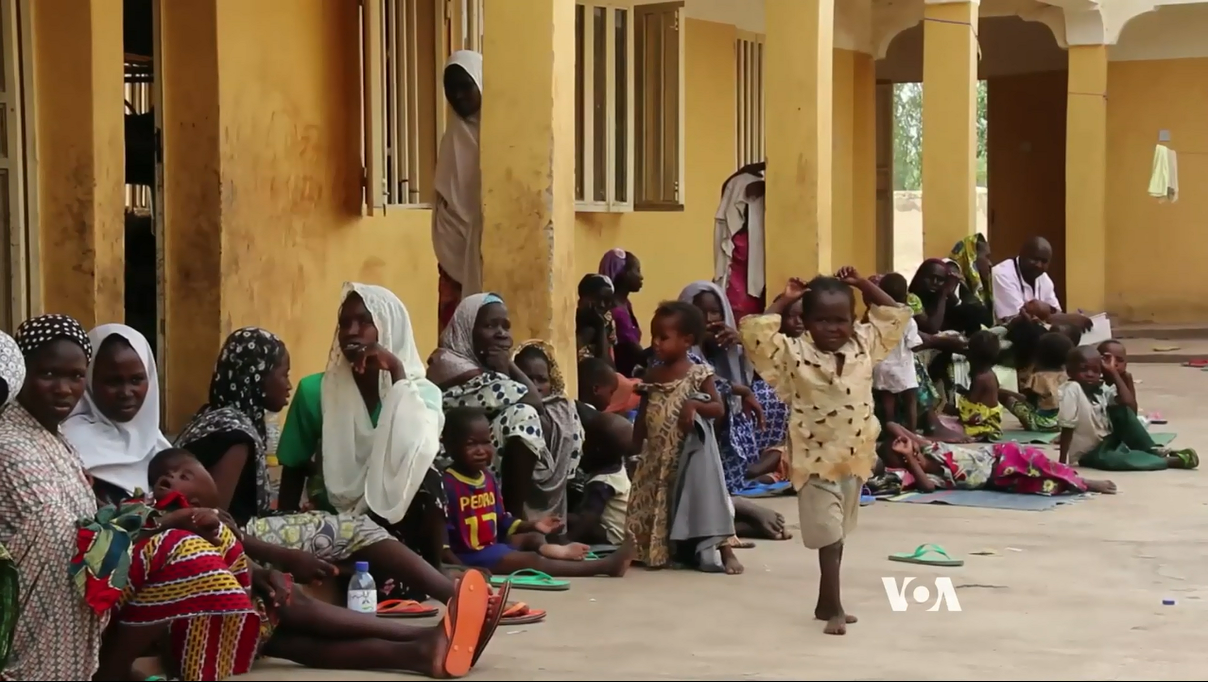
Hostages rescued during the offensive

Freed captives had been subjected to forced labor, as well as sexual and physical abuse. Some were forced to fight alongside Boko Haram rebels or were used as human shields. According to initial reports, some of the captives were traumatized to the point where they fired upon their rescuers, believing the militants were "good people who had treated them well". Others painted a different picture, saying their captors kept them indoors, brought out only when needed to retrieve food. They were severely beaten and given only minimal food – rescued children were described as visibly malnourished by the press. Other children had forgotten their own names. Amnesty International African director Netsanet Belay remarked "The trauma suffered by the women and girls is truly horrific." An aid worker described the captives as "not in great condition ...All of them are traumatized. They're hungry. They're sick." Of the first 275 captives, only 61 were over the age of 18; 214 were visibly pregnant. None of them knew the location of the Chibok girls, but said militants who visited their camp had claimed the girls were sold or forced into polygamous marriages with militants.

According to freed hostages, Boko Haram was running short of weapons as a result of the multinational offensive. Frustrated by the lack of support from their leadership, militants were abandoning the hostages with minimal fight, or attempting to sell them for 2,000 naira (US$10) or less. One hostage reported overhearing militants talking about how their leaders had deceived them into using violence.

=== Further efforts ===
Efforts to press into the Sambisa Forest were slowed, as the military encountered landmines and booby traps. Boko Haram pushed back, launching suicide attacks on civilians and attempting to capture the Giwa Barracks in Maiduguri. The attack was repelled, but about 30 civilians were killed in the crossfire, bringing the number of civilians killed in the counter-attack to 60. On May 15, Boko Haram forces recaptured the border town of Marte, demonstrating that efforts to contain the militant group to the forest were not completely successful. Deputy governor of Borno State, Zannah Umar Mustapha, said militants has returned to various previously cleared towns to resume the fighting.

The following day, the Nigerian military destroyed ten Boko Haram camps in the Sambisa Forest. One soldier and an unspecified number of militants were killed in the raids.

In September 2015, the Director of Information at the Defence Headquarters of Nigeria announced that all Boko Haram camps had been destroyed.

Rescues were still ongoing as of October 2015. On 28 October 2015, it was announced that Nigerian troops had rescued 338 people from Boko Haram near the group's Sambisa forest stronghold, in the northeast of Nigeria. Of those rescued, 192 were children and 138 were women.

On 24 December 2015, Muhammadu Buhari, the President of Nigeria, claimed that Boko Haram was "technically defeated."

== See also ==
- Islamic State of Iraq and the Levant
- Boko Haram
