= Battle of Freetown (1995) =

- Part of Sierra Leone Civil War
Date	12–20 May 1995
Location	Waterloo–Newton corridor, Freetown outskirts, Sierra Leone
Result	EO–SLA victory: RUF forced to retreat over 100 km eastward
Territorial changes	Freetown perimeter permanently secured

Belligerents
Executive Outcomes; Sierra Leone: SLA	RUF; Supported by: NPFL

Commanders and leaders
Eeben Barlow (Sierra Leone) Valentine Strasser	Foday Sankoh

Strength
~150–200 EO contractors ~1,000 SLA infantry	~2,000–3,000 insurgents

Casualties and losses
EO; Minor wounded; SLA; <15 killed or wounded	150–200+ killed; dozens wounded

The Battle of Freetown also known as the Siege of Freetown was a military engagement fought from 12 until 20 May 1995 on the eastern approaches to Freetown, Sierra Leone, during the Sierra Leone Civil War. The battle was fought between the combined forces of the Private Military Company Executive Outcomes (EO) and forces from the Sierra Leone Army (SLA) against insurgents of the Revolutionary United Front (RUF). The counter-offensive successfully halted the RUF's advance within 20 kilometers of the capital, preserving Valentine Strasser's National Provisional Ruling Council (NPRC) government and preventing the capture of the city.

== Background ==
By April 1995, the RUF led by Foday Sankoh and supported by Charles Taylor's NPFL in Liberia, had captured vast areas of Sierra Leone's interior territories including the diamond fields of Kono District and the mines at Sierra Rutile.Advancing along the primary eastern highway, RUF columns established forward staging bases at Waterloo and Newton less than 25 kilometers from central Freetown.

The Sierra Leone Army was severely demoralized, under-equipped, and plagued by internal corruption. A significant number of soldiers covertly collaborated with insurgents or engaged in civilian looting, earning the moniker "sobels" (soldiers by day, rebels by night). Facing potential military collapse, the NPRC military junta led by Captain Valentine Strasser contracted South Africa-based South Africa-based Executive Outcomes in April 1995. Headed by Eeben Barlow, EO dispatched an initial force of approximately 150 to 200 combat personnel coming largely from former South African Defence Force units.

== Preparations ==
Upon arriving at Lungi International Airport EO commanders conducted reconnaissance along the eastern part of Freetown. They confirmed that RUF combatants had heavily fortified the junction town of Waterloo to prepare a multi-pronged assault into Freetown's eastern suburbs. EO selected a core of the SLA infantry, reorganizing them into mobile strike elements and equipping them with modern communication gear, uniform kit, and night-vision capabilities.

== Battle ==
On May 12, 1995, joint EO-SLA forces launched a coordinated offensive to clear the Waterloo corridor. EO deployed Russian-built Mi-24 "Hind" helicopter gunships operated by experienced aircrews to conduct precision strikes against RUF's positions. Using the RUF's lack of night-fighting equipments, EO teams and retrained SLA infantry bypassed known road ambushes through the jungle flanks. Over a week of intense combat the joint force dislodged entrenched RUF positions and made them and retreated over 100 kilometers eastward into the interior, abandoning significant caches of small arms, mortars, and ammunition.

== Casualties ==
Executive Outcomes reported minor contractor injuries and zero fatalities, while the SLA suffered under 15 killed or wounded. The RUF suffered an estimate 150 to 200 or more killed in action during the clearing of Waterloo and Newton, with hundreds wounded or scattered.

== Aftermath ==
The Battle of Freetown in May 1995 changed the geopolitical landscape of the Sierra Leone Civil War, securing Waterloo removed the immediate military threat to Freetown, allowing government institutions foreign diplomatic missions, and international relief agencies to remain operational. Clearing the capital's perimeter allowed EO and the SLA to transition from defense to offensive operations.
