= International Code of Conduct for Private Security Service Providers =

The International Code of Conduct for Private Security Service Providers (the Code) is a set of principles for private military and security providers, created through a multi-stakeholder initiative convened by the Swiss government. This process involved and continuously involves representatives from private security companies, states, and civil society organizations. The code reinforces and articulates the obligations of private security providers particularly with regard to international humanitarian law and human rights law. The Code also sets the foundation for developing an institutional framework to provide oversight of and accountability to the Code. Accordingly, the stakeholders involved agreed on ‘Articles of Association’ setting up an oversight mechanism, the International Code of Conduct Association (ICoCA).

== Overview of The International Code of Conduct ==
The Code is a non-state mechanism and is therefore intended to be supplementary to state legal oversight of private security providers. It has been designed to apply in complex security environments, meaning any areas experiencing or recovering from unrest or instability, whether due to natural disasters or armed conflicts, where the rule of law has been substantially undermined, and in which the capacity of the state authority to handle the situation is diminished, limited, or non-existent. Other non-state attempts to regulate of private security, however, have often been criticized as ineffective. In contrast, the Code has been accepted by a significant number of companies, and is supported by states and civil society organizations: As of June 1, 2013, 659 private security providers were signatories to the ICoC. In addition, the United Nations require membership of ICoCA as a mandatory requirement for the hiring of private security providers by the UN agencies. Similarly, the draft Swiss legislation on private security providers requires membership of ICoCA as a precondition for permission to operate in Switzerland a private security company offering services abroad, and only member companies of ICoCA can be hired by Swiss public authorities. Recently, also the US Department of State indicated "[a]s long as the ICoC process moves forward as expected and the association attracts significant industry participation, the Bureau of Diplomatic Security (DS) anticipates incorporating membership in the ICoCA as a requirement in the bidding process for the successor contract to the Worldwide Protective Services (WPS) program."

== The oversight mechanism ==
In February 2013 representatives from signatory companies, civil society and governments negotiated the Charter for the Oversight Mechanism of the International Code of Conduct for Private Security Service Providers (called ‘Articles of Association’). The Geneva-based oversight mechanism, the International Code of Conduct for Private Security Service Providers' Association, also known as the International Code of Conduct Association, ICoCA, is an independent non-profit association under Swiss law. The overarching purpose of this Association is to promote the responsible provision of private security services and respect for human rights and national and international law by exercising independent governance and oversight of the Code.

The main organs of the oversight association are a General Assembly and a board of directors. While all members – private security companies, civil society organizations, and states (the three ‘pillars’) – form part of the General Assembly, the Board of Directors consists of twelve elected members. The board of directors is the executive decision-making body of the Association. Members of each ‘pillar’ are equally represented in the board of directors. The main tasks and competencies of the Association are: (a) certification of companies under the Code attesting that a company's systems and policies meet the Code's principles and the standards derived from the Code, (b) human-rights-oriented monitoring of company performance and of the impact of security operations, and (c) maintaining a process to support member companies in discharging their commitments to address claims alleging violations of the Code by establishing grievance procedures.

== History ==
The first time, a "code of conduct" was mentioned in order to close a regulatory gap was in a scientific article about human rights violations by private service providers in Abu Ghraib. The argument was "...a common normative standard of human rights obligations would provide a gernal legal framework which would shape national legislation and international dispute settlement. [...] the definition of direct obligations is a first step which could be implemented by states via regulation, by international organizations via monitoring and advice, by NGOs as independent watch-dogs and by business itself with a code of conduct." In 2008, the International Committee of the Red Cross (ICRC) and the Swiss government developed the Montreux Document on State obligations while contracting Private Military and Security Companies, which reaffirms the obligations of States regarding PMSCs during armed conflicts, and additionally recommends seventy good practices for States regarding the use and oversight of PMSCs. In parallel to the Montreux Document a Draft of a Code of Conduct was published as an Occasional Position Paper of the Geneva Centre for the Democratic Control of Armed Forces. This proposal of norms and commitments attached States, NGOs and industry to engage into the development of the International Code of Conduct. The Code builds on these recommendations to supplement the Montreux Document by articulating the obligations of private actors. The Code was drafted and in a conference that concluded in September 2010 and was facilitated by the Swiss government, the Geneva Academy of International Humanitarian Law and Human Rights, and the Geneva Centre for the Democratic Control of Armed Forces. The conference involved representatives from Private Security Providers, industry associations, governments, such as the US and UK, and non-governmental organizations. There were 58 original signatory companies, and as of June 1, 2013, 659 private security providers were signatories to the Code. In accordance with the Code, in November 2011 members from the three stakeholder communities chose representatives for a temporary steering committee. The committee consisted of three participants and one possible auxiliary member from each of three stakeholder groups: governments, companies, and civil society organizations. The main task of the steering committee was to develop documents and arrangements for the governance and oversight mechanism as previewed in the Code. The steering committee succeeded in this task and in February 2013 the ‘Articles of Association’ of the International Code of Conduct for Private Military and Security Company's Association were adopted. The Association itself was launched in September 2013. Signatory companies are no longer recognised by the Association and the Swiss government no longer maintains a registry of Signatory Companies. Reference to Signatory Companies was removed from the Code in amendments made to the Code in December 2021. The Code now refers to Members and Affiliates.

ICoCA has been recognised as an industry-specific implementation mechanism of the UN Guiding Principles on Business and Human Rights. Anita Ramasastry, then Chair of the UN Working group on Business and Human Rights during an address at the ICoCA Annual General Assembly in December 2020 said “ICoCA is an example of a multi-stakeholder process that builds on the Guiding Principles in terms of the core concept on human rights due diligence...this is an example of policy coherence...ICoCA has and continues to tackle key challenges as they arise...ICoCA has created a situation where a soft-law standard can become a harder one as it becomes embedded in government procurement... As opposed to purely static, top-down regulation..ICoCA paves the way for what robust human rights due diligence looks like, accompanied and supported by a sector-specific multi-stakeholder initiative.”

As of October 2022, 113 private security companies had joined the Association as Members or Affiliates, along with seven government Members, 49 civil society Members and 66 Observers.
