= ANSI/ASIS PSC.4-2013 =

ANSI/ASIS PSC.4-2013 is guidance for Quality Assurance and Security Management for Private Security Companies Operating at Sea.

The guidance document explains how to implement ANSI/ASIS PSC.1-2012 within the maritime environment. ANSI/ASIS PSC.4-2013 is one of four documents published in the ANSI/ASIS series that apply to Private Security Companies.

For another draft maritime security standard, see ISO/PAS 28007:2012.
