= STTEP International =

Gibraltarian private military company

STTEP
- Type: Private military company
- Founded: 2006
- Key people: Eeben Barlow (chairman), Lourens Horn, Harry Carlse
- Services: Providing military combat forces including personnel and equipment, law enforcement and training, logistics, and security services
- Website: www.sttepi.com

STTEP International, short for Specialised Tasks, Training, Equipment and Protection, is a private military company founded in 2006. It was founded by Eeben Barlow, who also founded Executive Outcomes.

STTEP was hired by the Nigerian government in 2015 to provide military training for the offensive against Boko Haram. Though the company is secretive about its contracts, it claims to have operated throughout Africa, the Far East, the Middle East and Central America.

Barlow resigned as chairman in 2020 to restart Executive Outcomes, which had originally ceased operations in 1998.
