= Freedom fighter =

Person who fights for political freedom

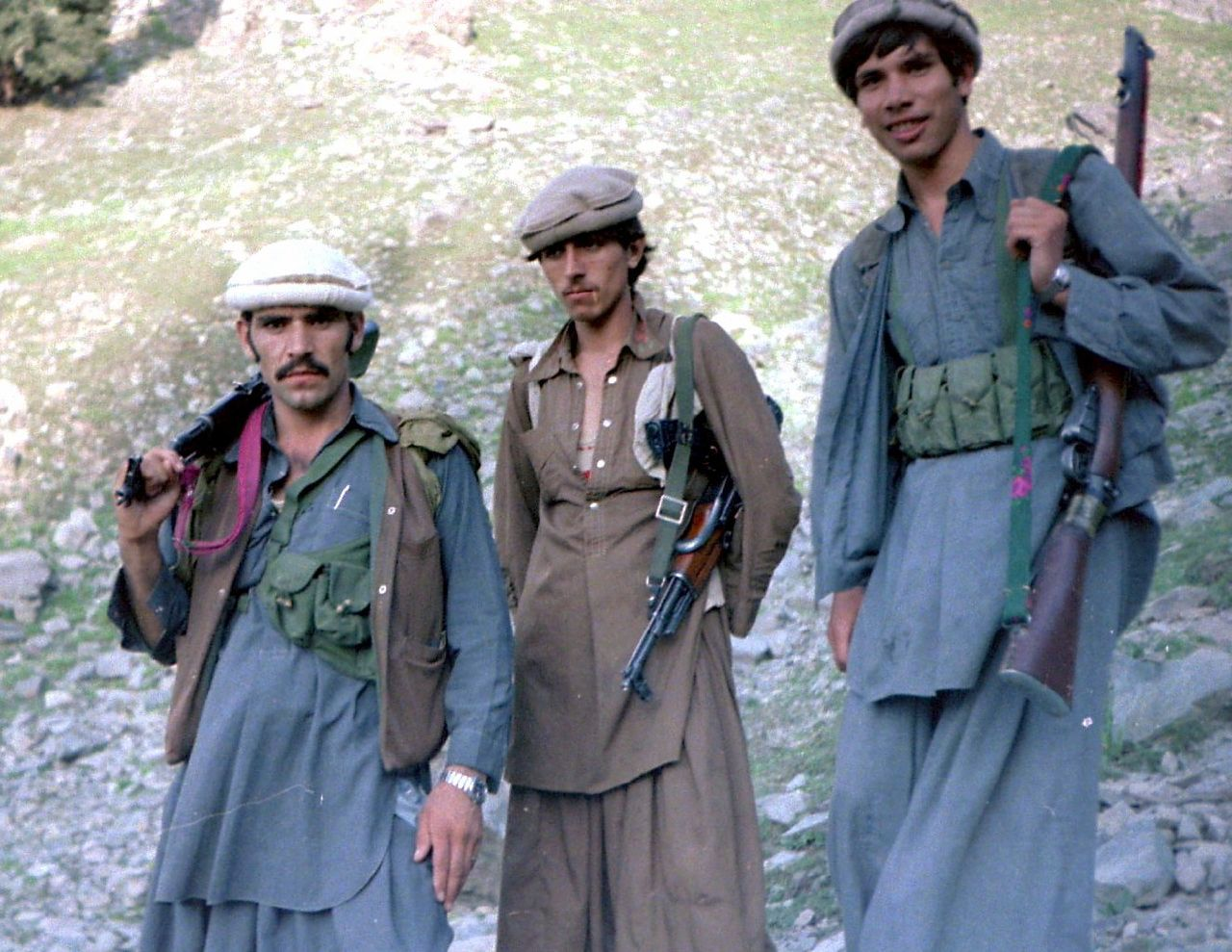
Afghan mujahideen were considered freedom fighters by US president Ronald Reagan (1985 photo).

A freedom fighter is a person engaged in a struggle to achieve political freedom, particularly against an established government. The term is typically reserved for those who are actively involved in armed or otherwise violent rebellion.

== Terminology ==
Generally speaking, freedom fighters are people who use physical force to cause a change in the political and or social order. Notable historical examples include uMkhonto we Sizwe in South Africa, the Sons of Liberty in the American Revolution, the Irish Republican Army in Ireland and Northern Ireland, the Eritrean People's Liberation Front in Eritrea, the Mukti Bahini in Bangladesh Liberation War, and the National Resistance Army in Uganda, which were considered freedom fighters by supporters. However, a person who is campaigning for freedom through peaceful means may still be classed as a freedom fighter, though in common usage they are called political activists, as in the case of the Black Consciousness Movement. In India, "Freedom fighter" is an officially recognized category by the Indian government covering those who took part in the country's independence movement; people in this category, which can also include dependant family members, get pensions and other benefits like special railway counters.

People who are described as "freedom fighters" are often also referred to as assassins, rebels, insurgents, or terrorists. This led to the aphorism "One man's terrorist is another man's freedom fighter". A notable example of this discrepancy can be found surrounding the armed conflict between the Palestinian group Hamas and Israel. The degree to which this occurs depends on a variety of factors specific to the struggle in which a given freedom fighter group is engaged. During the Cold War, freedom fighter was first used with reference to the Hungarian rebels in 1956. Ronald Reagan picked up the term to explain America's support for rebels in communist states or in countries otherwise perceived to be under the influence of the Soviet Union, including the Contras in Nicaragua, UNITA in Angola, and the multi-factional mujahideen in Afghanistan.

A freedom fighter is different from a mercenary as they gain no direct material benefit from being involved in a conflict, though they may have personal reasons for being involved. The use of mercenaries is prohibited by the Geneva Conventions Protocol I and the United Nations Mercenary Convention, under which both state actors and unlawful combatants may be tried as criminals. Because freedom fighters are not considered mercenaries under international law, they may in certain circumstances be protected by it. In the media, the BBC tries to avoid the phrases "terrorist" or "freedom fighter", except in attributed quotes, in favor of more neutral terms such as "militant", "guerrilla", "assassin", "insurgent", "rebel", "paramilitary", or "militia".

== See also ==
- Insurrectionary anarchism
- Irregular military
- Propaganda of the deed
- Resistance movement
