= Private maritime security company =

Private security companies

A Private Maritime Security Company (PMSC) is a form of Private Military Company that offers services in the maritime sector.

== Overview ==
PMSCs have become increasingly prominent since the late 2000s due to the increasing privatisation of military forces, rise in modern piracy and the expansion of the neoliberal container shipping industry.

PMSCs offer a diverse range of services varying from signal intelligence for civilian ships to armed port security for logistics companies. The most prominent, and controversial, service that these companies offer is armed anti-piracy support.

The main services offered by PMSCs can be broken down into 4 areas:

1. Security intelligence, risk assessment and consulting
2. On-site security services (armed and unarmed)
3. Crisis response
4. Intervention

PMSCs are most frequently used by private companies for their security or intelligence services in the aim of streamlining supply-chains to increase profits.

PMSCs are also used by national governments as a neoliberal solution to modern security issues such as piracy and its negative impacts on their import based economies. See the "Success" section for more information.

The regulation of PMSCs characterises the clash between national and international sovereignty due to the nature of Flags of Convenience. This clash is also where PMSCs derive their operational and economic success from. PMSCs are able to use Flags of Convenience to navigate the current nation-state based world order to 'opt-out' of national regulation and avoid the applicability of international regulation. This increases their profits and operational success which in-turn increases their market value, popularity and legitimacy as a solution to maritime security issues.

The PMSCs are especially active in areas with strategically important waterways where piracy is a serious security threat. Today, hotspots include: the Indian Ocean, the Strait of Malacca, the Strait of Hormuz the Gulf of Guinea, the Gulf of Aden, and the Gulf of Mexico.

The presence of the PMSCs points to a global system where non-state actors and global supply chains play significant roles in international affairs.

== Emergence ==
Modern private military companies came into prominence in the early 2000s due to their role in the US-led war on terror. They were widely seen as a success as they provided a diplomatically, economically and strategically efficient and successful method to achieve logistical and tactical goals in co-operation with national forces. Due to the commerciality of maritime security, PMSCs are frequently the sole security actors in a space or conflict, this has led to many controversies

After the 2009 Maersk Alabama hijacking, Somali Piracy rose to the forefront of the security agenda for western nations and PMCs. Existing PMCs moved into the maritime sector and new PMSCs were set up to profit from this new challenge.

The boom and importance of neoliberal globalism is reflected in the shipping industry. Currently, shipping accounts for the transport of over 80% of goods globally. As piracy poses a threat to this trade, it also poses a threat to international security due to the import/export based nature of the liberal world order. PMSCs have been described as a manifestation of the overlap between (inter)national security and neoliberal global supply chains

SAMI is a membership organisation which represents maritime security companies and acts as a focal point for global maritime security matters. In 2011 the International Chamber of Shipping (ICS) offered its public support for the use of private armed security aboard ships.

The International Maritime Organisation (IMO) is a UN organisation that regulates global shipping. It represents about 80% of the world’s merchant fleet.

== Success ==
PMSCs have widely been considered successful, they provide a diplomatically, economically, and tactically advantageous solution to both national and private maritime security issues. However, they are widely considered to be in need of more regulation.

The international Maritime Bureau (IMB) has reported that no ship with armed PMSC staff onboard has been successfully hijacked by pirates.

PMSCs also provide political protection to nation states as they are a method of outsourcing accountability for some controversial and sensitive areas of national interest. This is most commonly in relation to the use, and transportation, of weapons within the territorial waters of other nations. Even though private companies are rarely held accountable for any violations they commit, when they are, they can be fined and punished accordingly. If national armed forces were to commit similar violations they could easily escalate and create unwanted large scale international disputes.

PMSCs have been widely praised as a solution to nations that may be involved in political issues beyond their economic or operational scope. This has famously been the case in Somalia where the national government could not effectively deal with their coastal piracy issue which challenged global shipping interests. Since PMCs moved into the area, Somali piracy has drastically reduced.

PMSCs have proved to be an effective short term solution to fill the security gap whilst developing nations build up their own capabilities to deal with said issues. However there is to debate on whether they are an effective long-term solution as private military companies have a profit incentive for the area to remain unstable as to justify their presence.

However, this view of a profit incentive to prolong conflict has been critiqued by many scholars as an oversimplification. Land based PMC literature insists that this issue is only common when there is one PMC in the area. The literature stresses that when there are multiple PMCs involved, the profit incentive shifts from prolonging the conflict to solving the conflict. However, due to the commercial nature of PMSCs, it is very common that only one company is present on each operation.

PMSCs can also fulfil the foreign policy goals of nation states by securitising the overlap of national interest and market interest that is inherent in a globalised world. This is demonstrated by the focus that wealthy consumer based nations have put on using international coalitions to counter piracy. Examples include the EU’s Atalanta, NATOs Ocean shield and Bahraini based Combined Task Force 150.

== Services ==
The most prominent offshore use of PMSCs is the armed protection of vessels against pirates. These kinds of armed protection and anti-piracy services at sea are mostly minor operations and only require the presence of security personnel for short periods of time. Five to ten guards are usually sufficient to protect a ship against pirates.

PMSCs are increasingly offering their services to safeguard commercial shipping interests.

The contemporary private maritime security market offers a wide range of services, such as:

- Operational and tactical military and maritime security training
- Security intelligence analysis and risk advisory services and assessments
- Rapid emergency response
- Hijack and hostage negotiations
- Armed and unarmed operational support. This consists of anti-piracy operations, fishery protection, coast guard duties and logistics support. Note that armed guards are not allowed in some states such as Nigeria and Sierra Leone.
- Armed and unarmed site security. (ports, offshore platforms and cruise vessels).

PMSCs are frequently hired by the commercial shipping industry, individual ship-owners, insurance companies, private luxury yachts, cruise liners, or port operators. Governments also sometimes hire PMSCs. Cruise liners and large passenger ferries are often discreetly using the services provided by the PMSCs such as signals intelligence.

The PMSCs are operating with a desire to ensure that the provision of their security services remains profitable.

== Controversy ==
The demand for private maritime services is not a modern phenomenon but has received global attention more recently.

There are differing views as to whether the engagement of private security services undermines the security and sovereignty of individual states. This is because the use of force is traditionally viewed as an act requiring the prerogative of the state.

There have been concerns and controversies about the use of excessive and aggressive force by PMSCs. This has created many legal, ethical, economic, and political issues.

PMSCs share in many critiques with land based PMCs such as; acting as mercenaries, having a lack of accountability and vague applicability of /responsibility to international law. This is because the current frameworks that are used to determine international law at sea, (UNCLOS and SUA) have an outdated definition of piracy. Under UNCLOS, attacks in territorial waters cannot legally be considered acts of piracy as states can only exercise universal jurisdiction over pirates that occur on the high seas. This regulation is not practically enforceable onto PMSCs.

Diplomats and UN officials have stated “it is common knowledge in the industry that PMSCs pre-emptively attack – perhaps even kill – anyone they perceive as a threat.” And PMSCs “Do not have any consequences for their actions”. PMSC representatives claim this is because of their contractual obligations to shipping companies to maintain secrecy on operational activities. However, the master of the vessel has the responsibility to report any potential crimes and private companies do not have an incentive to report issues that may bring about criminal charges to their contractors. Furthermore, flags of convenience make it unclear who the shipmaster should report to.

PMSCs have also faced criticism for acting as floating armouries. A UN report in 2012 found PMSCs to be holding 7000 weapons and had begun leasing them, their ammunitions and security equipment to private bodies.

PMSCs have also been documented carrying state owned weapons in the EEZs of sovereign nations and throwing weapons overboard before entering ports. These “Floating Armouries” have been found to be both peaceful and aggressive. The IMO has been encouraged to pass more regulation on these phenomena to protect the security of coastal states that they inherently threaten

Due to the geographical nature of the sea and the land-based bureaucracies that govern PMSCs, it is very difficult to enforce any regulatory laws. Laws and guidelines are frequently overlooked due to the economic efficiency of PMSCs, and violations are not investigated due to social, legal and economic consequences that may result from uncovering abuses. (see Legal and policy issues for more detail)

PMSCs have been described as an effective short-term, but dangerous long-term, solution; this is because of the maritime geography and marketplace offering a different profit incentive than land based PMCs. PMSCs usually operate as the sole security actors in a space, unlike land based PMCs which are usually employed to back up a national military operation. This means that land based PMCs have their profit motive in achieving national goals, which usually includes making an area safe for civilians and military personnel. PMSCs however, are predominately assisting a private company achieve economic goals and therefore have their profit motive in securitising the space for economic incentives over security ones.

This economic model problematises piracy as a security issue affecting profits, when piracy is largely a symptom of mass-spread poverty, corruption, lack of opportunity and legacy of societal violence. Under the PMSC profit incentive, these root causes will not be addressed as they are not immediately relevant to the companies bottom line profits. Additionally, the solving of these issues would largely undermine their own necessity and market model.

The lack of interaction with public authorities determines the consequences of privatising security and complicate the engagement of PMSCs. In Southeast Asia the PMSCs only cooperate with government agencies at a local level.

== Legal and policy issues ==
=== Current framework ===
The current legal framework that governs maritime security in international law (with a focus on piracy and armed robbery against ships) is found in the following conventions: United Nations Convention on the Law of the Sea (UNCLOS), the Convention for the Suppression of Unlawful Acts against the Safety of Maritime Navigation (SUA) and its Protocol. It is also found in the International Convention for the Safety of Life at Sea (SOLAS) (chapters V, and XI-2).

Further Relevant legislation is The UN Firearms Protocol as the use of firearms for vessel protection is a crucial aspect of PMSCs and their services. In addition to these Conventions, the IMO has issued multiple guidelines complementing the international security framework and has adopted three sets of interim recommendations.

These IMO guidelines have been widely critiqued as they are not legally binding and frequently overlooked. Additionally, these international laws are designed for individuals instead of international companies. This makes it difficult to hold a PMSC accountable to any laws as under this framework, lower ranking individuals are the legally culpable ones. see “Debate on Regulation” section for more information.

PMSCs face many moral issues when combatting piracy as it is not considered an “armed conflict”. This means that the companies are not bound to international humanitarian law or any treaties they may have signed to uphold it. However UN Security Council resolution1851 has suggested that piracy may be viewed as an armed conflict in the future.

PMSCs are increasingly sanctioned by their flag states, however, coastal states hesitate to allow PMSCs that engage in potentially violent actions within their territory. This has been partially addressed with treaties between individual coastal states and foreign military powers allowing a regulated flow of armed vessels through their waters. However, these treaties fail to comprehensively address the issue due to two factors. Firstly, these agreements are not legally binding and are subsequently ignored in light of this and their operational success. Secondly, the nature of Flags of Convenience undermines the role of any legally binding nation on nation treaties.

=== Use of Flags of Convenience (FOCs) ===
See the Flags of Convenience page for more information on the wider principles and implications of FOCs

A ship may fly the flag of any nation if it meets certain requirements set out by the nation in question. Flying of a nations flag means that the vessel is bound to the laws and regulations of that nation. This has led to a supply and demand issue of flag states competing to be the least regulated and therefore most commonly used flag by all commercial maritime actors in high risk areas to avoid regulation, regulatory costs, scandals and taxes. These are referred to as Flags Of Convenience.

According to the UN in 2009, the top 11 FOCs consisted of nearly 55% of the worlds registered vessels. In the case of PMSCs, FOCs are usually used in relation to the transportation and use of weapons by staff who may have veteran or criminal backgrounds that prevent them from joining private military companies under certain national laws.

With the exception of the Marshall islands, None of the open registry nations (nations that do not require any ‘genuine’ connection for registry such as residency) have any restrictions on types of weapons contractors can use, impose any entry qualifications for security guards, or issue only short-term licenses. This allows for “unchecked maritime policing”.

Liberia is considered “possibly the most permissive of all the world’s major flag states” and it takes up 11.9% of ships in the High risk area. Liberia has no formal regulations on the use of firearms and “almost total discretion regarding the hiring and oversight of maritime security companies”.

The applicability of national regulation depends, to some extent, on the legislative power and authority of the nation in question; Many FOC states do not have the institutional capacity to enforce their own or international regulation onto registered vessels. However regulation has also been systemically ignored even in nations with legislative capability and authority as developed as the UK.

== Debate on Regulation ==
Scholastic consensus widely agrees that PMSCs are an effective part of maritime and supply-chain security, however they are in need of considerable regulatory improvement to prevent a wide range of legal and moral issues such as tax avoidance, weapons smuggling, mercantile activities, summary executions, torture, excessive use of force and violation of national sovereignty.

Regulation of this industry has been mostly stagnant since 2013. This is partially due to the inherent issues of regulating a matter of national sovereignty (flag states) through predominantly international means (international laws, organisations and guidelines). This has led to 3 main approaches to regulate PMSCs: National (flag-state) regulation, Self-regulation and International regulation.

=== National regulation (flag state) ===
Scholars have pointed to the Italian mode of regulation as an example of national regulation.

Italy introduced a law in 2011 that forced all Italian registered vessels to deploy security to ensure high regulatory standards were met. It originally insisted on national forces, but the law soon changed to include private security forces as well. During the tenure of this law, there were no pirate attacks on Italian flagged ships. However, the law was alleged to have pushed many Italian shipping companies to use FOCs to avoid regulation which would ultimately reduce their bottom line profits. The law was scrapped 4 years after its introduction.

The Italian case acts as an example of the issues faced when trying to address an international and borderless issue against unofficial actors with bordered and official legislation. National forces are only allowed to use force in, and have legal jurisdiction in, the high seas. This is due to their adherence to certain international laws. This gives pirates operational mobility and physical protection in coastal waters. The ambiguity around the accountability of PMSCs to these laws is where they operationally and economically excel.

==== Outsourcing of Accountability ====
One of the main issues with national based regulation is its failure to address flags of convenience.

National based regulation has been used as a method for certain nations to maintain a positive image through passing strong internal regulations on PMSCs with the knowledge that these guidelines will not be applicable to the valuable companies they supposedly target, as they shall continue to rely on FOCs.

These claims are supported by statistics from multiple agencies. The UN published a report in 2009 stating that the top 11 FOCs consisted of almost 55% of all registered vessels. Most of the worlds largest shipping companies are western companies.

Additionally, the UK department of transport published data showing that the shipping fleets of Panama (18.9%), Liberia (11.9%), the Marshall Islands (11.7%), Hong Kong (9.8%) and Malta (5.7%) account for 58% of the global merchant fleet (measured in deadweight tonnage) all of these nations are common FOCs. Singapore (6.8%), and Greece (4.1%) the only other flags that represent a fleet carrying more than 4% of global commercial tonnage.

However, the nations that have been the focus of academic and public attention (in regards to their stricter regulation of PMC activity) have a considerably lower share of the global merchant fleet, despite being the nations that control the majority of shipping companies.

The UK (0.8%), Italy (0.9%), the USA (0.6%), Norway (1.1%) and Denmark (1.0%) are shipping superpowers that comprise less than 5% of the flagged global fleet. The fleets of Germany, Spain, France and the Netherlands (also shipping superpowers) count for even less. This has been pointed to as evidence of western nations outsourcing the accountability of their economic necessity to rely on loose regulation. Passing strong internal regulation yet still relying on the flags of convenience of foreign nations is an effective way to maintain a good public image and plausible deniability whilst reaping the benefits of questionable practices at sea.

=== Self-Regulation ===
The debate for self-regulation is primarily only advanced by PMSCs themselves due to profit motives. Self-regulation Controls are usually weak and “do not aim to provide a barrier to market entry for companies not adhering to the standards.” And “voluntary industry-led regulatory measures can only aspire to define and encourage best practice rather than impose it;”.

Self-regulation has been enacted due to pressure from the IMO such as ISO/PAS 28007:2012 which offers guidelines for companies deploying armed security personnel onboard ships. however the standard is an optional accreditation. Subsequently, self-regulation is widely considered a public relations exercise to legitimise economically advantageous behaviour.

=== International regulation ===
International regulation is the most commonly suggested fix to unilaterally address the regulation of PMCs. However it is still flawed as it cannot holistically address FOCs due to the nature of international sovereignty being subordinate to national sovereignty. (see the National regulation subsection for more detail).

Success with the regulation of private military contractors on land, such as the ICCPSSP, have been used to argue that international regulation is possible. Attempts have been made for a similar approach for ocean based PMCs Culminating in the 2007 Montreux document and many IMO guidelines. However these are not legally binding. In the eventuality of any legally binding international guidelines arising, they would face large-scale issues in enforcement due to the geographic, political and economic nature of ocean regulation (see “legal and policy issues” section for more information)

A UN report demonstrated that from 2010-2015 national navies had over 50 encounters with pirates and had detained over 1200 individual pirates. Within the same period of time only one PMSC published any information on this topic. Despite a lack of data, PMSCs are assumed to have far more encounters with pirates than national forces due to their greater presence in the High Risk Area(s). This lack of transparency results in a very difficult environment for international regulation to be implemented and adhered to.

=== Hybrid Models ===
Common hybrid models take the form of suggesting that international regulation is needed to fix the loopholes that FOCs exploit, whilst flag-states should create internal regulations on the use of force and tracking/regulating veterans (who make up the bulk of PMSC staff). This is because large amounts of PMSC staff are armed forces veterans from nations with pension policies that push them towards the private military industry.

Proposals of international courts to prosecute pirates have been put forward. These will likely fail to prosecute PMC staff of powerful nations as has been the case with land based PMCs.

All proposals for regulation face the issue of international sovereignty being subordinate to national sovereignty. Whilst certain organisations and pressure groups can push for an individual state to reform this is not a possibility with PMSCs given the nature of FOCs and a lack of bureaucratic infrastructure and incentive to implement regulations.

== See also ==
- Private Military Company
- Privateer
- Piracy in the 21st century
- Flag of Convenience
- IMO
