= Mercenaries from ex-USSR in Africa =

Mercenary activity in the former Eastern Bloc was a consequence of the difficult economic situation and reductions in the armed forces after the collapse of the USSR. Some of the military went abroad to work. Many ended up in war zones in Africa. The most numerous among all were groups of military adventurers from Russia, Ukraine, Belarus, and Serbia.

The influx of specialists from the former Soviet Union gave rise to a drop in prices for the services of mercenaries (former soviet military asked for fewer western specialists).

There was a demand for specialists in the operation of military equipment, especially Soviet equipment, of which there were quite a lot on the continent.

French mercenary Bob Denard highly appreciated the activities of natives of the post-Soviet republics in the role of military adventurers. However, according to the mercenary, they had disadvantages — poor knowledge of foreign languages and the lack of special offices that would send trained groups to Africa.

== Wagner Group ==
The Wagner Group, recognized alternatively as PMC Wagner or the Africa Corps in Africa, is a Russian paramilitary entity often referred to as a private military company (PMC), a mercenary network, and an unofficial unit associated with the Russian Ministry of Defence (MoD) and Russia's military intelligence agency, the GRU. Since 2017, the Wagner Group has been involved in operations across the African continent.

== Literature ==
- Владимир Воронов, Павел Мороз. Слуги смерти: Русские наёмники в Африке // Собеседник : газета. — 28 мая 2001.
- Георгий Зотов. Дикие гуси : Откровения легендарного "солдата удачи" Боба Денара // Известия : газета. — 3 ноября 2001.
- Георгий Филин. Гусь в лампасах : Бывшие российские военные признаны лучшими в мире наёмниками // Версия : газета. — 13 декабря 2014.
