= Paul Lubeck =

Paul Michael Lubeck (born 1943) is an American professor of sociology, director of the Global Information Internship program and the Center for Global, International and Regional Studies at the University of California, Santa Cruz. He is also a senior fellow at the Center for International Policy.

Lubeck teaches political sociology, political economy and development studies. He served in the Peace Corps in the Niger Republic and has done research in Niger, Nigeria, Ghana, Mexico and Malaysia including "the relationship between globalization processes and the Islamic revival in urban-industrial contexts". He writes on globalization, industrializing states, African businessmen, labor, Islamic social movements and regional development strategies.
