= ANSI/ASIS PSC.1-2012 =

ANSI/ASIS PSC.1-2012 is a management standard for quality of private security company operations.

The standard seeks to operationalise the International Code of Conduct (ICoC) within a formal structure familiar to businesses. That structure, with national and international supervision, provides auditable procedures for the development of the standard, certification to it, and monitoring of ongoing compliance. It incorporates elements of the Montreux Document.

Dr. Ian Ralby, a recognized expert on the regulation, governance, and oversight of private security companies, described the development of these standards in a 2015 paper for the Fletcher Security Review: "The ANSI/ASIS PSC.1 Standard, developed by a Technical Committee of over two hundred people from twenty-six countries, is by far the most detailed instrument relevant to the regulation, governance and oversight of the private security industry. It is the flagship Standard of the ANSI/ASIS PSC Standards Series which seek to operationalize the ICoC within a formal structure familiar to businesses. That structure, with both national and international supervision, provides auditable procedures for the development, certification, and monitoring of ongoing compliance. PSC.1 pushes the envelope with regard to business standards as the first to incorporate human rights requirements. The ICoC's purpose was primarily to commit signatories to human rights principles regardless of whether they were so obligated by law. The PSC Standard Series takes that voluntary commitment a step further and requires companies, in order to be certified, to have adequately incorporated compliance with international human rights principles into their operating policies and procedures. The PSC.1 Standard is currently in the process of being converted into a full international Standard, ISO 18788."

ANSI/ASIS PSC.1-2012 is one of four documents published in the ANSI/ASIS series that apply to Private Security Companies.
