= ISO/PAS 28007:2012 =

ISO/PAS 28007:2012 was developed as an initiative by the maritime industry and based on a request by the International Maritime Organization to provide guidelines for ISO 28000-certified companies deploying Privately Contracted Armed Security Personnel (PCASP) on board ships.

It was specifically developed for organisations operating in the Piracy High Risk Area in the Indian Ocean, usually providing security transits from the Suez Canal to Southeast Asia and the Indian subcontinent. However, many of the certified or soon to be certified Private Maritime Security Companies equally apply the practices to their operations in other parts of the world.

ISO/PAS 28007 is part of a wider range of initiatives to regulate the private security industry which have been developed in recent years. The International Code of Conduct Association for Private Security Service Providers ("ICoCA") recognises ISO/PAS 28007 as a standard to achieve ICoCA certification.

The United Kingdom Accreditation Service ("UKAS") is the only national accreditation body that accredits auditing companies to certify to the standard. As of May 2015, three certification bodies were actively certifying according to ISO/PAS 28007: LRQA, MSS Global and RTI Forensics.

In an op-ed criticizing the UK Governments laws for prosecuting individuals who enlist to fight in foreign wars George Monbiot described a loophole that allowed UK citizens to fight in foreign wars, for money, not ideology. Monbiot cited the qualifications for individuals to seek employment as Maritime Security operatives as legalizing "naval mercenaries".

== See also ==
- ANSI/ASIS PSC.4-2013 - another maritime private security standard
