= Montreux Document =

On private military companies in war zones

The Montreux Document on Pertinent International Legal Obligations and Good Practices for States Related to Operations of Private Military and Security Companies During Armed Conflict
Participating states
Non-participating states that are members of participating international organizations
- Type: Non-binding document
- Drafted: January 2006
- Signed: September 17, 2008
- Location: Montreux, Switzerland
- Original signatories: Afghanistan; Angola; Australia; Austria; Canada; China; France; Germany; Iraq; Poland; Sierra Leone; South Africa; Sweden; Switzerland; Ukraine; United Kingdom; United States
- Signatories: 59
- Languages: Arabic, Chinese, English, Finnish, French, Russian, and Spanish

The Montreux Document is a multinational agreement specifying governance practices regarding private military and security companies in war zones. It was ratified in Montreux, Switzerland, in September 2008.

== Content ==
Its full name is "The Montreux Document on Pertinent International Legal Obligations and Good Practices for States Related to Operations of Private Military and Security Companies During Armed Conflict".

The document lists some 70 recommendations for state practices such as verifying company track records, examining procedures used to vet staff, conduct prosecution when breaches occur, and ensure compliance and personnel training compatible with international humanitarian and human rights law.

Provisions specify legal obligations incumbent on private security companies. The focus is on times of armed conflict – but the principles are expressly relevant to non-armed conflict situations. It is a non-binding, non-legal document in that it neither creates nor alters legal obligations, but articulates existing requirements pertinent to private security operations.

This document states that governments take responsibility in these situations:

- Contracting states: countries who contract a private military and security companies;
- Territorial states: countries where private military and security companies operate;
- Home states: countries where private military and security companies are registered.

== Impact ==
Elements have been incorporated into the management system standards jointly authored and published by ANSI/ASIS, such as PSC.1-2012 and PSC.4-2013.

== See also ==
- Private military company
- International Convention against the Recruitment, Use, Financing and Training of Mercenaries
