= Executive Outcomes =

South African private military company

- Type: Private military security firm
- Industry: Private military and security contractor
- Founded: 1989; 2020 (re-established)
- Founder: Eeben Barlow
- Area served: Africa (Angola & Sierra Leone)
- Products: Providing military combat forces including personnel and equipment, law enforcement and training, logistics, close quarter training, and security services
- Services: Security management, full-service risk management consulting
- Number of employees: 2,000+
- Website: executiveoutcomes.com

Executive Outcomes is a private military company (PMC) founded in South Africa in 1989 by Eeben Barlow, a former lieutenant-colonel of the South African Defence Force. It later became part of the South African-based holding company Strategic Resource Corporation. The company was reestablished in 2020.

== History ==
=== Background ===
In 1989, following the conclusion of the South African Border War in Angola and Namibia, the apartheid government was looking at broad cuts in its military personnel. This initial drawdown accelerated rapidly as the apartheid system was dismantled in the early 1990s. African National Congress leader Nelson Mandela demanded that then South African President Frederik Willem de Klerk dismantle some of the South African and South West African Special Forces units such as 32 Battalion and Koevoet. One of these was the Civil Cooperation Bureau (CCB), a unit that carried out covert operations which included assassinations of government opponents, and worked to bypass the United Nations apartheid sanctions by setting up overseas front companies.

Only Koevoet, being part of the South West African Police (SWAPOL), was disbanded as part of independence negotiations for South West Africa (now Namibia). Many members of the other units, or simply former national servicemen, were recruited by Executive Outcomes (EO).

=== Formation ===
Eeben Barlow and Michael Mullen, formerly in charge of the Western European section of the CCB, established Executive Outcomes (EO) in 1989. Its aim was to provide specialised covert training to Special Forces members.

It has been alleged that Barlow was awarded a contract by Debswana to train a selected group of security officers, and that when Debswana discovered EO was training the Angolan Armed Forces (FAA), it promptly cancelled EO's contract.

"Many of Barlow's Special Forces students would later join him at EO after he started recruiting men to assist with the training of the Angolan forces," says Walter Halicki, one of Eeben's associates in the FAA.

The company also went on to recruit many of its personnel from the units President F. W. De Klerk disbanded. Even former enemy fighters of the uMkhonto we Sizwe and Azanian People's Liberation Army were recruited as well since many were found out of work after their own restructuring and integration to the South African National Defense Force. At its peak, EO employed about 2,000 former soldiers.

Barlow registered Executive Outcomes Ltd in the UK on the insistence of the South African Reserve Bank. There is some confusion over this issue as a top secret British intelligence report states that "Executive Outcomes was registered in the UK in September 1993 by Anthony (Tony) Buckingham, a British businessman and Simon Mann, a former British officer". Buckingham denies that he registered EO in London and consistently denies any "corporate ties" to EO.

=== Key personnel ===
Apart from founder Eeben Barlow (CEO), other senior EO personnel were Lafras Luitingh (Deputy to CEO) and Nic van der Bergh (CEO after Barlow resigned). Senior associates included Simon Mann, Tony Buckingham and Derek Williams who, along with Barlow and Luitingh were the executive officers of Ibis Air, the aircraft procurement organisation for Executive Outcomes which was essentially their private "air force". Crause Steyl was the South African-based director of Ibis Air.

== Activities ==
=== Angola ===
Executive Outcomes initially trained and later fought on behalf of the Angolan government against UNITA after UNITA refused to accept the election results in 1992. This contract was awarded to the company after EO had assisted Ranger Oil with an equipment recovery operation in the harbour town of Soyo. Dubbed by the South African media as an attempt to assassinate the rebel leader Dr. Jonas Savimbi, EO found itself under constant UNITA attacks where it lost three of its men. This action saw EO as being recognised by the FAA and a contract to train its forces was awarded. In a short space of time, UNITA was defeated on the battlefield and sued for peace. The Angolan government, under pressure from the UN and the US, were forced to terminate EO's contract. EO was replaced by the UN's peacekeeping force known as UNAVEM. Angola returned to war shortly thereafter.

=== Sierra Leone ===
In March 1995, the company contained an insurrection of guerrillas known as the Revolutionary United Front (RUF) in Sierra Leone, regained control of the diamond fields, and forced a negotiated peace.

In the case of Angola this led to a cease fire and the Lusaka Protocol, which ended the Angolan Civil War – albeit only for a few years. In Sierra Leone, however, the government capitulated to international pressure to have EO withdraw in favour of an ineffective peacekeeping force, allowing the RUF to rebuild and sack the capital in "Operation No Living Thing".

As is characteristic of one of the first PMCs, Executive Outcomes was directly involved militarily in Angola and Sierra Leone. The company was notable in its ability to provide all aspects of a highly trained modern army to the less professional government forces of Sierra Leone and Angola. For instance, in Sierra Leone, Executive Outcomes fielded not only professional fighting men, but armour and support aircraft such as one Mi-24 Hind armed attack military helicopter and two Mi-8 Hip military transport helicopters, one BMP-2 infantry fighting vehicle and one T-72 main battle tank. These were bought from sources in the worldwide arms trade within Africa as well as Eastern Europe.

=== Ibis Air ===
Ibis Air was a partner business entity that provided EO with airborne services, including medevac capabilities via a Boeing 727 with the registry D2-FLZ. Ibis Air also owned a small fleet of MiG-23 "Flogger" fighters and Pilatus PC-7 turbo-prop trainers converted for the reconnaissance and ground attack capabilities using SNEB air-to-ground rockets. It was also allowed to operate Su-25 "Frogfoot" ground support aircraft that were loaned out to EO by the Angolan Air Force.

==== Other contracts ====
Executive Outcomes had contracts with multinational corporations such as De Beers, Chevron, Rio Tinto Zinc and Texaco. The governments of Angola, Sierra Leone and Indonesia were also clients.

== Dissolution ==
Executive Outcomes actively encouraged the South African government to enforce a regulation of PMCs as several South African and international companies were masquerading for work under the banner of Executive Outcomes. Additionally, Executive Outcomes was actively engaged in providing input into the formulation of the bill which became known as "Regulation of Foreign Military Assistance Act" in 1998.

The aim of the Act was to stop mercenary activities by the dual actions of:

1. preventing direct participation as a combatant in armed conflict for private gain including the training, recruitment and use of mercenaries; and,
2. requiring approval of the National Conventional Arms Control Committee for offering of military assistance overseas.

Executive Outcomes was duly provided with a licence stipulating that it met the requirements of the newly introduced Act.

Executive Outcomes was dissolved on 31 December 1998.

== Sandline International ==
Executive Outcomes was often loosely linked with the United Kingdom private military company Sandline International. In 1997 Sandline directly subcontracted Executive Outcomes for their operation in Papua New Guinea to oust the rebels holding the Pangua mine on Bougainville Island which led to the so-called "Sandline affair" when news of the government's intention to hire mercenaries was leaked to the Australian press.

The Commander of the Papua New Guinea Defence Force, Jerry Singirok – who reversed his support for the operation – ordered the detaining of all the mercenaries on their arrival, and forced the Prime Minister Sir Julius Chan to resign with Papua New Guinea coming close to a military coup.

== Sterling Corporate Services ==
A UN report from July 2012 criticised the South African security company Sterling Corporate Services for assembling a "private army" in defiance of international agreements and also of Somali sanctions. The report was conducted by the UN's Monitoring Group on Somalia and Eritrea (SEMG) and revealed strong links to Executive Outcomes.

== Reestablishment ==
In November 2020, founder Eeben Barlow stepped down from his position as chairman of STTEP to restart Executive Outcomes. He mentioned that part of his company's mission would now be "to expose those media and intelligence whores that thrive on lying for secret payments." Barlow claimed that the decision to restart the company came at the request of "some Africa [sic] governments", which he had "little choice but to accept."

== See also ==
- UN Mercenary Convention
- Unlawful combatant
- Arms trade
- STTEP
- Neall Ellis
- Combined arms
