= Private military company =

Company providing armed combat or security services

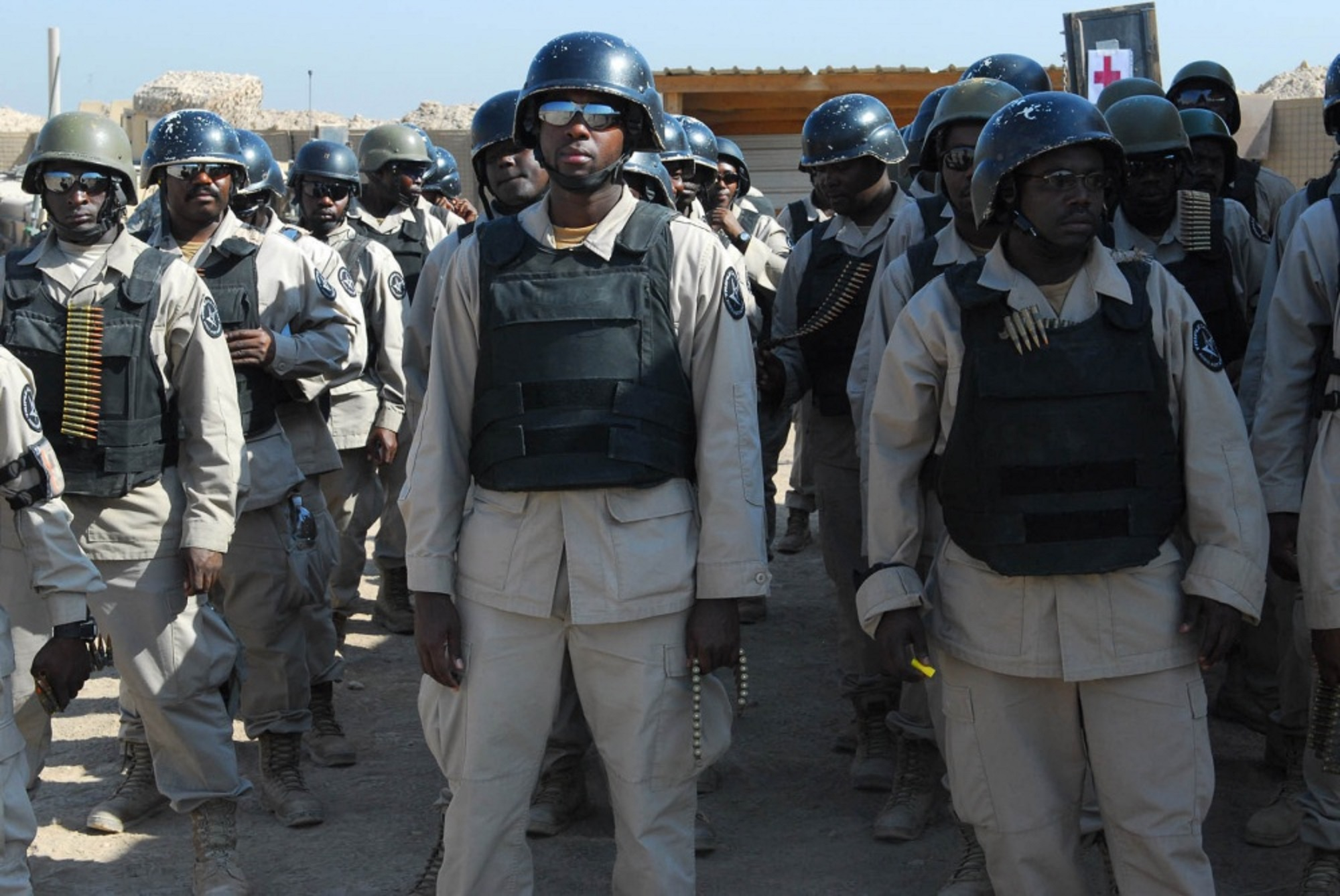
Ugandan Triple Canopy contractors undergoing training in Iraq, 2011

A private military company (PMC) or private military and security company (PMSC) is a privately held company that provides armed combat or security services, military training or consulting, or operational support such as intelligence or logistics. PMCs refer to their personnel as "security contractors" or "private military contractors." These terms are often viewed as euphemisms for mercenaries or soldiers of fortune, but some scholars and many in the industry argue that private military contractors are distinct from mercenaries.

Some of the most well-known private military companies include Executive Outcomes (1989–1999, 2020–Present), Blackwater (1999–Present, now called Academi and part of Constellis), and the Wagner Group (2014–Present).

Depending on the company, PMCs provide services from military consulting and training to active participation in combat. They often train or supplement the armed forces of sovereign governments, but are also hired by private corporations or nongovernmental organizations to provide personal protection to specific people or property, especially in hostile territories. Some documented PMC activities include supporting the militaries of Mali, Niger, and Burkina Faso against insurgent groups like JNIM in the Sahel; military aviation repair in East Africa; close protection for Afghan President Hamid Karzai; and piloting reconnaissance airplanes and helicopters as a part of Plan Colombia.

In 2003, the industry was earning over $100 billion a year. According to a 2008 study by the Office of the Director of National Intelligence, private contractors make up 29% of the workforce in the United States Intelligence Community and cost the equivalent of 49% of their personnel budgets.

== Legality and difference from mercenaries ==
The legality of private military companies, particularly those that engage directly in combat, depends on the laws and treaties of relevant states, and whether or not PMCs are considered to be mercenaries.

Under Article 47 of Protocol I to the Geneva Conventions, mercenaries are unlawful combatants. However, the article's definition of a "mercenary" is vague enough that many PMCs are exempt even if they would be called mercenaries in common parlance. Article 47 states that "[A mercenary] is neither a national of a Party to the conflict nor a resident of territory controlled by a Party to the conflict."

=== UN Mercenary Convention ===
In 1989, the United Nations Mercenary Convention banning the use of mercenaries was initiated and entered into force on 20 October 2001. As of August 2021, the convention had been ratified by 37 states, and signed but not ratified by 9 states.

=== 2007 Uniform Code of Military Justice amendment ===
In 2007, the American Uniform Code of Military Justice was amended to allow for prosecution of military contractors deployed in a "declared war or a contingency operation."

=== International Code of Conduct (2008) ===
In 2008, the International Committee of the Red Cross, the Swiss government, and contributors from private security companies and the civil society/NGO sector developed and proposed the Montreux Document on Private Military and Security Companies, detailing international legal obligations and specific recommendations related to PSC services procurement practices and operational oversight, as well as clarifying the obligations of states pertaining to the hiring of such entities during armed conflicts. As of December 2018, fifty-four states had signed the Montreux Document.

== History ==
=== Cold War ===
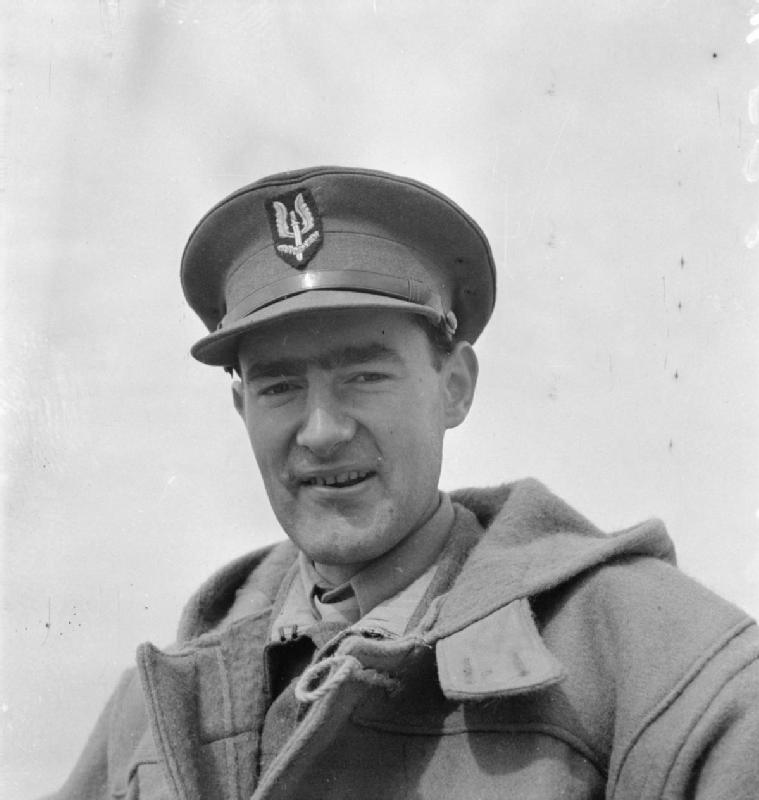
David Stirling, founder of the SAS, founded a PMC in the 1960s.

Modern PMCs trace their origins back to a group of ex-SAS veterans in 1965 who, under the leadership of the founder of the SAS, David Stirling and John Woodhouse, founded WatchGuard International (formerly with offices in Sloane Street before moving to South Audley Street in Mayfair) as a private company that could be contracted out for security and military purposes.

The company's first assignment was to go to Yemen to report on the state of the royalist forces when a ceasefire was declared. At the same time, Stirling was cultivating his contacts in the Iranian government and exploring the chances of obtaining work in Africa. The company eventually operated in Zambia and in Sierra Leone, providing training teams and advising on security matters. Stirling also organised deals to sell weapons and military personnel to other countries for various privatised foreign policy operations. Contracts were mainly with the Gulf States and involved weapons supply and training. The company was also linked with a failed attempt to overthrow Colonel Muammar Gaddafi from power in Libya in 1971. Woodhouse resigned as Director of Operations after a series of disagreements and Stirling himself ceased to take an active part in 1972.

Stirling also founded KAS International (aka KAS Enterprises) and was involved in a collaboration with the World Wide Fund for Nature to forcibly reduce the illegal poaching and smuggling of elephant tusks in various countries of Southern Africa. Other groups formed by ex-SAS servicemen were established in the 1970s and '80s, including Control Risks Group and Defence Systems, providing military consultation and training.

=== Post–Cold War ===
Dramatic growth in the number and size of PMCs occurred at the end of the Cold War. The exodus of over 6 million military personnel from Western militaries in the 1990s expanded the recruiting pool for PMCs. Some of the larger corporations included Vinnell and Military Professional Resources Inc. in the United States; G4S, Sandline International and Keeni-Meeny Services in the United Kingdom; and Lordan-Levdan in Israel and Executive Outcomes in South Africa.

Some commentators have argued that there was an exodus from many special operations forces across the globe towards these private military corporations. Units that were allegedly severely affected included the British Special Air Service, the US Special Operations Forces and the Canadian Joint Task Force 2.

The Center for Public Integrity reported that since 1994, the Defense Department entered into 3,601 contracts worth $300 billion with twelve US-based PMCs, specifically during the initial response after Hurricane Katrina in New Orleans.

Domestic operations are generally under the auspice of state or federal agencies such as the Department of Energy or the Department of Homeland Security rather than the Department of Defense. Driven by increasing fears of domestic terror attacks and civil unrest and disruption in the wake of disasters, more conventional security companies are moving into operations arenas that would fall within the definition of a PMC. The United States State Department also employs several companies to provide support in danger zones that would be difficult for conventional US forces.

The October 2000 USS Cole bombing proved a pivotal moment for private military companies at sea and directly led to the first contract between Blackwater and the US military. Blackwater, and private military contractors in general, became notorious in the 21st century after their usage by the United States government in the American occupation of Iraq.

==== Seaborne PMCs ====
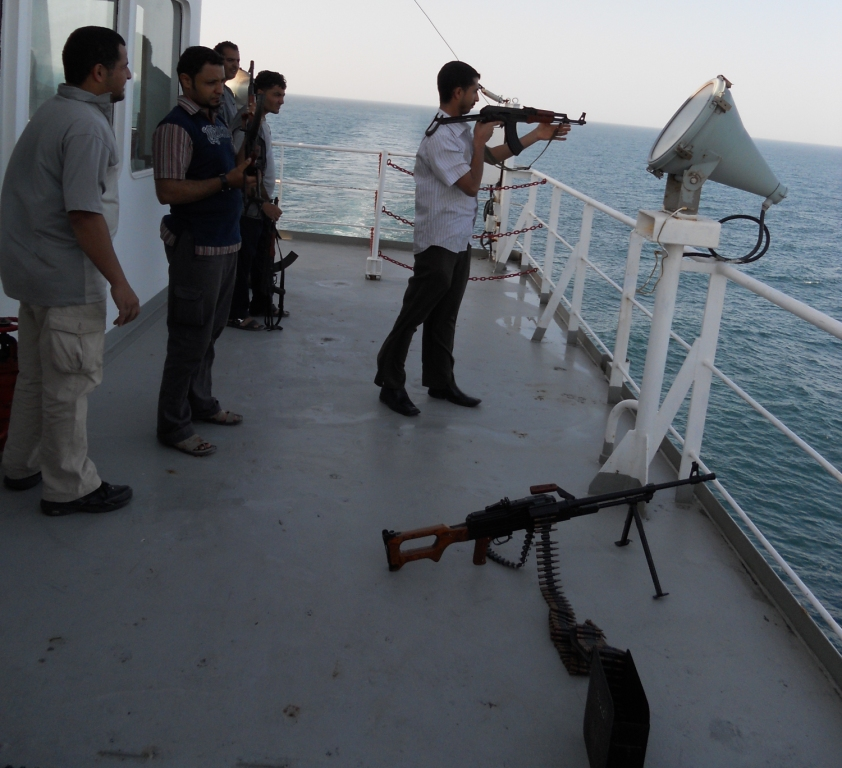
Armed contractors aboard a merchant ship to deter piracy

Since the late 2000s, PMCs have become increasingly involved in anti-piracy measures in Somalia and other regions. PMCs remain active in this region, mainly providing security for private shipping through the Gulf of Aden and at times contracting to aid UN efforts. PMCs were hired to deter pirates from attacking vessels and taking the shipping crew and their transport hostage. While a large variety of international naval missions with the same goals such as the EU's Atalanta, NATO's Ocean Shield, and Combined Task Force 150 are and were active in this region, it is still necessary for the shipping companies to have security personnel on deck. Due to their decentralized nature, it can be difficult for the UN or other international organizations to provide effective oversight over what happens on the seas. Whereas the UN showed that, between 2010 and 2015, there were over fifty encounters between the national sovereign navies that participated in the missions, resulting in over 1,200 detained pirates, only one PMC published information over this period. Since the PMCs are so much more active in this area, covering a larger part of it through activities on board trading ships, this could be a low estimate. PMC presence in Somalia is an example of two violent non-state actors at sea engaged in combat with each other.

==== Airborne PMCs (2005) ====
On April 5, 2005, Jamie Smith, CEO of SCG International Risk announced the expansion of services from the traditional roles of PMCs of protection and intelligence to military aviation support. SCG International Air would provide air support, medevac (medical evacuation), rotary and fixed-wing transportation, heavy-lift cargo, armed escort, and executive air travel to "any location on earth." That marked an expansion of services to rival the capabilities of some countries' armies and air forces.

==== NGO use of PMCs ====
As revealed in 2009 by Stoddard et al., the use of private security contractors by NGOs in dangerous regions is a highly sensitive subject. Quite often, the contractors hired are local companies and mostly are unarmed personnel guarding facilities; only rarely are international contractors or mobile armed security personnel used. Many NGOs have sought the services of private security contractors in dangerous areas of operation, such as Afghanistan, Somalia and Sudan, due to lack of knowledge, skills, and time to adequately meet the challenges of deteriorating security environments; and administrative costs of managing security in-house and potential to outsource the liability.

| Contracted for | International | Local |
|---|---|---|
| Unarmed guards for facilities/residences/project sites | 29% | 77% |
| Physical security for premises | 31% | 55% |
| Security management consulting | 37% | 9% |
| Security training for staff | 41% | 4% |
| Risk assessment/threat analysis | 36% | 7% |
| Information services | 26% | 12% |
| Armed guards for facilities/residences/project sites | 17% | 14% |
| Standby security | 13% | 16% |
| Mobile escorts (armed) | 9% | 13% |

However, it has been argued that outsourcing security leaves NGOs reliant on contractors and unable to develop their own security thinking and make their own decisions. Perceived association of PSPs with state security, police or military services in turn compromises the ability of NGOs to claim neutrality, leading to increased risk. Moreover, outsourcing may not necessarily lead to lower costs, and the cost of middlemen may result in more poorly paid and poorly trained personnel, who turn over frequently and cannot adequately perform the job. Finally, NGOs have obligations beyond strictly legal liability that include political, ethical and reputational implications: If the organisation's responsibility to prevent and mitigate any possible negative outcomes is better achieved through in-house security, it is argued, this should be their choice.

The result is that many NGOs are not open about their use of PSPs and researchers at the Overseas Development Institute have found that sometimes statements at NGOs central headquarters contradict those given by local staff. This prevents informative knowledge sharing and debate on the subject needed to improve NGO decisions regarding this issue, though there have been some notable exceptions; namely, the Afghanistan NGO Security Office and the NGO Coordination Committee in Iraq.

The private security contractor fulfills many different needs in the private and public sectors. While some nations rely heavily on the input of governments of such nations as the United States, other countries do not trust the US, so they tend to look for private contractors who will have a fiduciary obligation to them.

==== ISO for PMSC (2012) ====
In 2012, were published the ISO/PAS 28007:2012 Guidelines for Private Maritime Security Companies.

== Activities elsewhere ==
=== Afghanistan ===
- In December 2009, the Congressional Research Service, which provides background information to members of the United States Congress, announced that the deployment of 30,000 extra US troops into Afghanistan could be accompanied by a surge of "26,000 to 56,000" contractors. This would expand the presence of personnel from the US private sector in Afghanistan "to anywhere from 130,000 to 160,000." The CRS study said that contractors made up 69 percent of the Pentagon's personnel in Afghanistan in December 2008, a proportion that "apparently represented the highest recorded percentage of contractors used by the Defense Department in any conflict in the history of the United States." In September 2008, their presence had dropped to 62 percent, and the US military troop strength increased modestly.
- Also in December 2009, a US House of Representatives oversight subcommittee stated that it had begun a wide-ranging investigation into allegations that American private security companies that were hired to protect Defense Department convoys in Afghanistan would be paying off warlords and the Taliban to ensure safe passage. That would mean that the United States unintentionally and indirectly engaged in a protection racket and might be indirectly funding the very insurgents it is trying to fight. A preliminary inquiry determined that the allegations warranted a deeper inquiry and focused initially on eight trucking companies that share a $2.2 billion Defense Department contract to carry goods and material from main supply points inside Afghanistan (primarily Bagram air base) to more than 100 forward operating bases and other military facilities in the country.

=== Africa ===
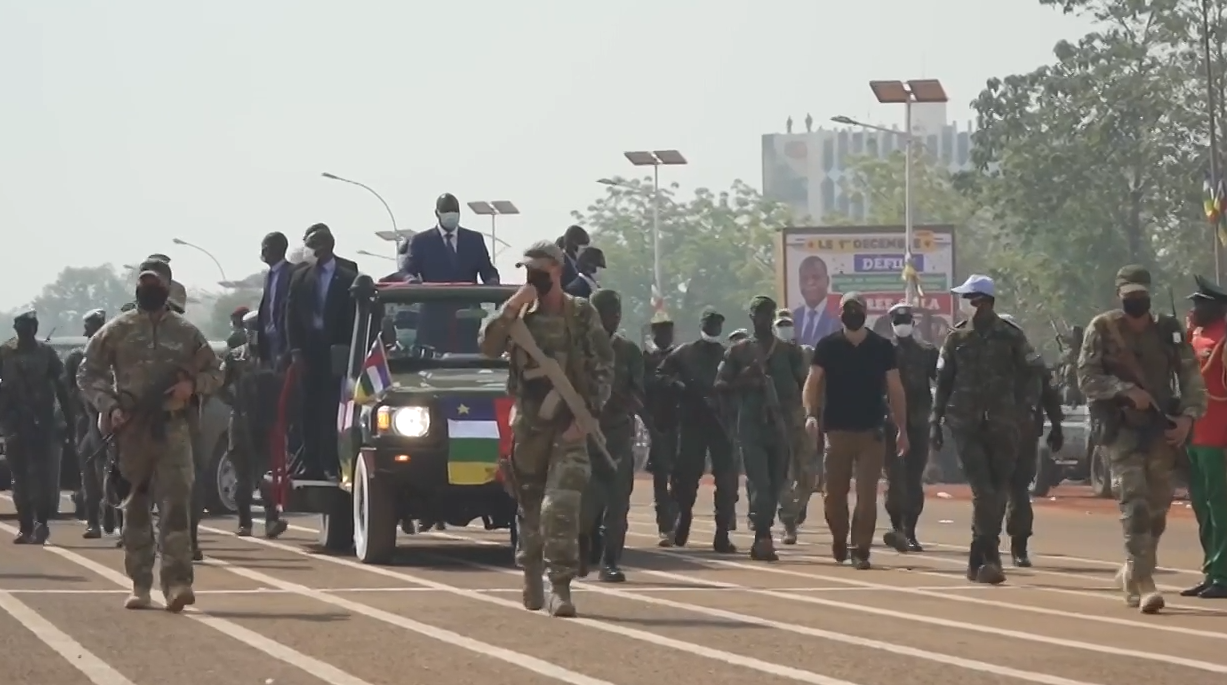
Wagner Group contractors providing security for President of the Central African Republic Faustin-Archange Touadéra

- In 1994 and 1995, the South African-based PMC Executive Outcomes was involved in two military actions in Africa. In the first conflict, Executive Outcomes fought on behalf of the Angolan government against UNITA after a UN-brokered peace settlement broke down. In the second action, Executive Outcomes was tasked with containing a guerrilla movement in Sierra Leone, the Revolutionary United Front. Both missions involved personnel from the firm training four to five thousand combat personnel for the Angolan government and retaking control of the diamond fields and forming a negotiated peace in Sierra Leone.
- In 2000, ABC Television's international affairs program Foreign Correspondent broadcast a special report, "Sierra Leone: Soldiers of Fortune", focusing on the exploits of South African pilot Neall Ellis and his Mi-24 Hind gunship. The report also investigated the failures of the UN Peacekeeping Force and the involvement of mercenaries/private military contractors in providing vital support to UN operations and British military Special Operations in Sierra Leone in 1999–2000.
- In mid-May 2006, police in the Democratic Republic of the Congo arrested 32 alleged mercenaries of different nationalities: 19 from South Africa, 10 from Nigeria and three from the United States. Half of them worked for the South African company Omega Security Solutions, and the Americans worked for AQMI Strategy Corp. The men were accused of plotting to overthrow the government, but charges were not pressed. The men were deported to their home countries.
- Due to strain of United States Armed Forces, the US State Department and The Pentagon have also outsourced the expanded military training in Africa to three companies: Military Professional Resources Inc., DFI International, and Logicon (now owned by Northrop Grumman).
- In 2015, STTEP International, (Specialised Tasks, Training, Equipment & Protection) was credited with providing support to the Nigerian military that has proved decisive in containing Boko Haram activities in Nigeria. The chairman of STTEP, Eeben Barlow, is the former CEO and founder of Executive Outcomes.
- The Central African-based park ranger organization African Wildlife Defence Force contracts former servicemen and law enforcement personnel to protect national parks and private game ranches in Africa. Candidates must undergo additional retraining to become park rangers. They are also referred to as Private Ranger Contractors or PRC.
- According to the United States Institute of Peace (USIP), since 2017, the Russian-based PMC, Wagner Group, has been operating continuously in Sudan, the Democratic Republic of the Congo, Mozambique, as well as in other African countries. Under the guise of helping governments defeat violent insurgencies or fight Islamic extremist movements, the Russian Wagner Group is believed by several US and African government sources to be responsible for significant crimes against humanity. It is reported that hundreds of contractors from the Russian PMC enter these countries each year. The Wagner Group has been accused of extreme violence against African civilians and human rights violations by the US State Department and most European governments.
- In the mid-2000s, a group of self-proclaimed former ANC freedom fighters, known as the TRAKboys, began to emerge in fringe political circles within Johannesburg and Cape Town. They gained national attention in South Africa when they began calling upon leaders to demand an investigation by the Department of Justice and Constitutional Development into the foreign and domestic activities of Executive Outcomes. Failed assassination attempts on several high-profile members of the TRAKboys, such as former Cape Town-based manufacturing tycoon, Dylan4K, have led to speculation, conspiracy theories and public outrage directed towards Apartheid-era, Afrikaner-owned PMCs operating in southern Africa.

=== Balkans ===
- In 1995, both Croatia and Bosnia hired Military Professional Resources Inc. (MPRI) to equip, train, and professionalize their armed forces.
- In 1999, an incident involving DynCorp in Bosnia was followed by a Racketeer Influenced and Corrupt Organizations Act (RICO) lawsuit being filed against DynCorp employees stationed in Bosnia. It alleged that "employees and supervisors from DynCorp were engaging in perverse, illegal and inhumane behavior and were illegally purchasing women, weapons, forged passports and participating in other immoral acts."

=== Iraq ===
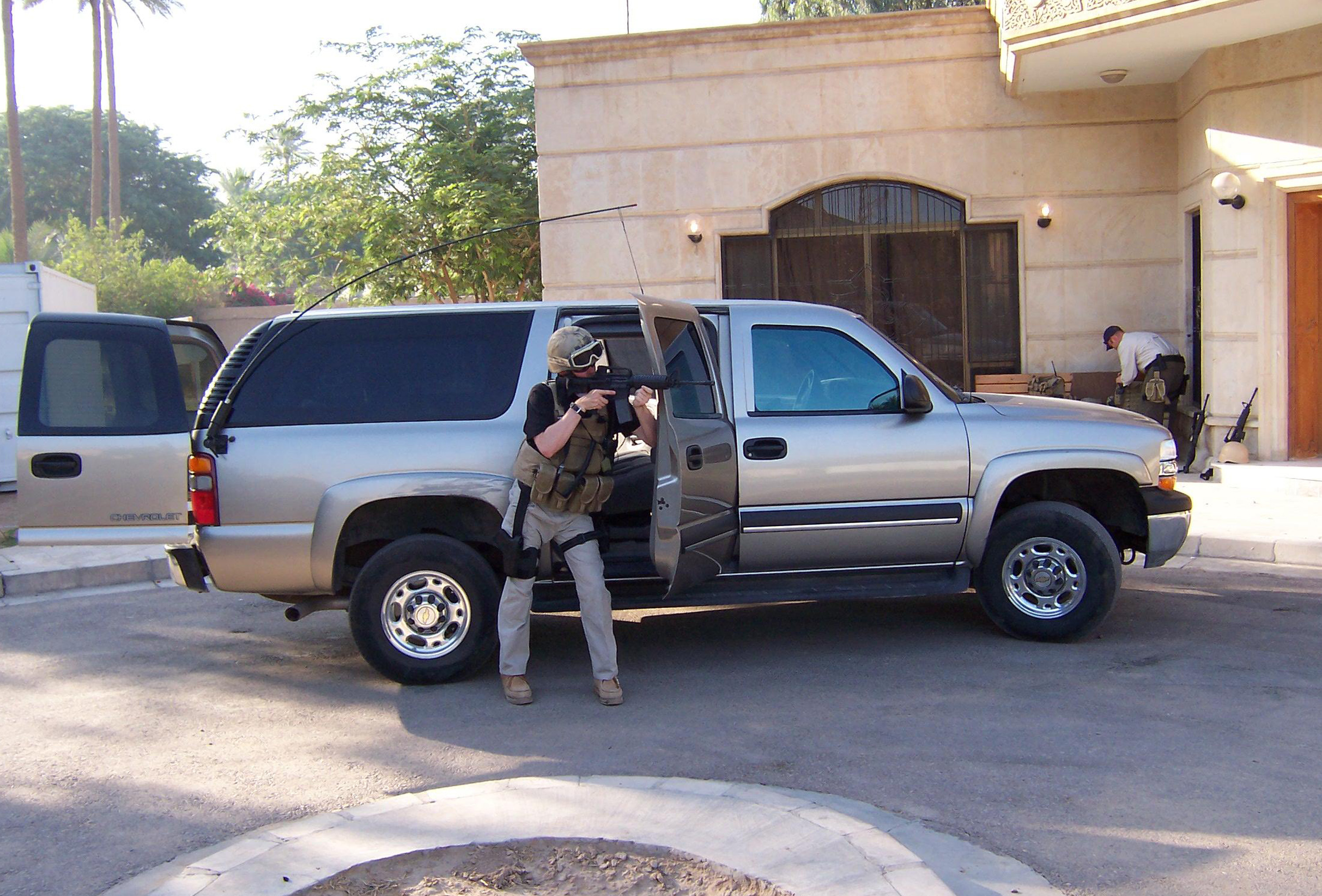
Iraqi contract security in the International (Green) Zone of Baghdad

In December 2006, there were estimated to be at least 100,000 contractors working directly for the United States Department of Defense in Iraq which was a tenfold increase in the use of private contractors for military operations since the Persian Gulf War, just over a decade earlier. The prevalence of PMCs led to the foundation of trade group the Private Security Company Association of Iraq. In Iraq, the issue of accountability, especially in the case of contractors carrying weapons, was a sensitive one. Iraqi laws do not hold over contractors.

On 5 December 2005, US Secretary of Defense Donald Rumsfeld justified the use of PMCs in Iraq on the basis that they were cost effective and useful on the ground. He also affirmed that they were not subject to the Uniform Code of Military Justice.

Two days before he left Iraq, L. Paul Bremer signed "Order 17" giving all Americans associated with the CPA and the American government immunity from Iraqi law. A July 2007 report from the American Congressional Research Service indicates that the Iraqi government still had no authority over private security firms contracted by the US government.

In 2007, the Uniform Code of Military Justice was amended to allow for prosecution of military contractors who are deployed in a "declared war or a contingency operation."

After the withdrawal of US troops from Iraq, the US State Department is reportedly planning to more than double the number of its private security guards, up to as many as 7,000. Defending five fortified compounds across the country, the security contractors would operate radars to warn of enemy rocket attacks, search for roadside bombs, fly reconnaissance drones and even staff quick reaction forces to aid civilians in distress. Its helicopter fleet, which will be piloted by contractors, will grow from 17 to 29.

PMCs supplied support to US military bases throughout the Persian Gulf, from operating mess halls to providing security. They supplied armed guards at a US Army base in Qatar, and they used live ammunition to train soldiers at Camp Doha in Kuwait. They maintained an array of weapons systems vital to the invasion of Iraq. They also provided bodyguards for VIPs, guard installations, and escort supply convoys from Kuwait. All these resources were called upon constantly.

In 2010, several Blackwater PMC employees "were indicted on unlawful killing charges in connection with their work as US government contractors during the Iraq War"; founder Erik Prince sold the company and departed soon thereafter.

==== List of defective occurrences ====
1. Employees of private military company CACI and Titan Corp. were involved in the Iraq Abu Ghraib prison scandal in 2003, and 2004. The US Army "found that contractors were involved in 36 percent of the [Abu Ghraib] proven incidents and identified 6 employees as individually culpable", although none have faced prosecution unlike US military personnel.
2. On March 31, 2004, four American private contractors belonging to the company Blackwater USA were killed by insurgents in Fallujah as they drove through the town. They were dragged from their car in one of the most violent attacks on US contractors in the conflict. Following the attack, an angry mob mutilated and burned the bodies, dragging them through the streets before they were hung on a bridge. (See also: 31 March 2004 Fallujah ambush, Operation Vigilant Resolve)
3. On March 28, 2005, 16 American contractors and three Iraqi aides from Zapata Engineering, under contract to the US Army Corps of Engineers to manage an ammunition storage depot, were detained following two incidents in which they allegedly fired upon US Marine checkpoint. While later released, the contractors have levied complaints of mistreatment against the Marines who detained them.
4. On June 5, 2005, Colonel Theodore S. Westhusing committed suicide, after writing a report exonerating US Investigations Services of allegations of fraud, waste and abuse he received in an anonymous letter in May.
5. On October 27, 2005, a "trophy" video, complete with post-production Elvis Presley music, appearing to show private military contractors in Baghdad shooting Iraqi civilians sparked two investigations after it was posted on the Internet. The video has been linked unofficially to Aegis Defence Services. According to the posters, the man who is seen shooting vehicles on this video in Iraq was a South African employee of Aegis Victory team named Danny Heydenreycher. He served in the British military for six years. After the incident, the regional director for Victory ROC tried to fire Heydenreycher, but the team threatened to resign if he did. Aegis, the US Army, and the US State Department each conducted a formal inquiry into the issue. The Army determined that there was no "probable cause to believe that a crime was committed."
6. On September 17, 2007, the Iraqi government announced that it was revoking the license of the American security firm Blackwater USA over the firm's involvement in the deaths of seventeen Iraqis in a firefight that followed a car bomb explosion near a State Department motorcade. The company was allowed to continue to operate in Iraq until January 2009 when the US–Iraq Status of Forces Agreement took effect. Blackwater was one of the most high-profile firms operating in Iraq, with around 1,000 employees as well as a fleet of helicopters in the country. In 2014, four Blackwater employees were tried and convicted in US federal court over the incident; one of murder, and the other three of manslaughter and firearms charges.
7. On March 12, 2017, Sallyport Global fired two investigators who alleged sex trafficking, alcohol smuggling, and security lapses by Sallyport employees at Balad Air Base in Iraq.

=== Middle East ===
- On March 27, 2006, J. Cofer Black, the vice chairman of Blackwater USA, announced to attendees of a special operations exhibition in Jordan that his company could now provide a brigade-size force for low-intensity conflicts. According to Black, "There is clear potential to conduct security operations at a fraction of the cost of NATO operations." Those comments were later denied. In March 2024, Intelligence Online reported that an ad was being circulated by former French special forces soldiers for around 3000–4000 foreign recruits. The ad was backed by Abu Dhabi-based Manar Military Company (MMC), which is run by a former French special forces officer, and is financially linked to a politically influential and wealthy Abu Dhabi family. The ad suggested that the UAE aimed to establish an elite foreign legion. Despite MMC claiming that the project was canceled and the ad was disinformation, experts said an Emirati foreign legion could be real. Since 2009, the UAE had been utilizing PMSCs, initially with Erik Prince. Investigations also revealed the UAE's involvement in hiring mercenaries for assassinations in Yemen and for supporting the Wagner Group.

=== Latin America ===
- In 2006, a US congressional report listed a number of PMCs and other enterprises that have signed contracts to carry out anti-narcotics operations and related activities as part of Plan Colombia. DynCorp was among those contracted by the State Department, and others signed contracts with the Defense Department. Other companies from different countries, including Israel, have also signed contracts with the Colombian Defense Ministry to carry out security or military activities.

=== Ukraine ===
The Russian Wagner Group has been deployed in the Russian invasion of Ukraine, fighting alongside the Russian Armed Forces since early 2022. In February 2023 it was reported that Russian Prime Minister Mikhail Mishustin signed a decree which allowed Gazprom to launch "a mercenary army". Several other mercenary groups have been in evidence, such as Redut, the ministerial-affiliated Patriot group, as well as dozens of other formations. According to one Dutch study, it was estimated that no more than approximately 35,000 operators of private military and security companies ever participated in combat in the Russo-Ukrainian War as of 2024.

=== Yemen ===
- Since 2015, the United Arab Emirates hired an estimated 1,800 Latin American contractors and 400 Eritrean troops for training and combat to support the Yemeni government's efforts against the Houthi rebels during the Yemeni Civil War.

=== China ===
- Contractors from the Hong Kong-incorporated Frontier Services Group (FSG) like Erik Prince have established close ties with Chinese state-owned firms since 2014 by providing security, logistics, and aviation for Chinese companies in dozens of countries across Asia, Africa, and Europe in connection with China's Belt and Road Initiative.
- In November 2018, FSG or its founder, incorporated a subsidiary in the Democratic Republic of the Congo with "a mandate to extract minerals and timber and conduct financial operations."
- FSG is favoured by CITIC, as of 2019 China's premier state-owned enterprise, with one of the largest pools of foreign assets in the world.
- In February 2019, FSG signed a preliminary deal with the Chinese government to establish a training base in Kashgar, Xinjiang.

=== Russia ===
The Constitution of the Russian Federation was adopted by national referendum on 12 December 1993, and entered into force on 25 December 1993. Article 13.5 reads: "The establishment and activities of public associations whose goals and activities are aimed at the forcible changing of the basis of the constitutional order and at violating the integrity of the Russian Federation, at undermining its security, at creating armed units, and at instigating social, racial, national and religious strife shall be prohibited." In addition, it has been illegal since at least the 1996 edition under Article 359 of the Russian criminal code to recruit, train or finance a mercenary. Also the use of him in an armed conflict or hostilities shall be punished.

Eeben Barlow apparently brought the idea of PMCs to Russia in 2010; there he gave an invited talk to the St. Petersburg International Economic Forum, as well as presented the PMC concept to representatives of the General Staff of the AFRF. At the time he proposed forming PMCs from retired military personnel and contractors.

The existence of Russian PMCs seems to go as far back as 2011, when the Syrian Civil War kicked off and violent unrest was felt in Libya before Muammar Gaddafi was eliminated in October. Russians had big investments in both of these countries. State-owned enterprise Rostec and its subsidiaries Rosboronexport and Technopromexport, as well as privately owned StroyTransGaz (STG) and Tatneft have billions of dollars invested in international affairs and like to hire from the Russian PMC sector.

In 2012, Vladimir Putin suggested to the State Duma to consider the legalization of PMCs, although owners of Russian PMCs have claimed that because Russia inherited its legal system from the Byzantine Empire, anything that is not explicitly prohibited is allowed.

The Syrian gains of ISIS in 2012 caused the Russian contingent to hire PMCs from the Moran Security Group (MSG) headed by Alexey Badikov, Slavonic Corps, Patriot PMC and Vega PMC. The MSG crew aboard the Myre Seadiver was arrested in October 2012 while in Nigeria.

Oleg Krinitsyn heads the RSB-Group, reportedly in 2013 Russia's largest PMC. The Moscovite MSG was the focus of attention in 2013 for its failed and bloody Syrian involvement. It contracted employees through the Slavonic Corps shell company owned by Vadim Gusev and based in Hong Kong to work for the régime of Bashar al-Assad, but the latter failed "to fulfill their financial obligations, which caused problems with the housing and feeding of the fighters from Slavonic Corps." Meanwhile, 100 of the 267 men hired in spring 2013 by Slavonic Corps perished in October 2013 in a firefight with ISIS. Out of the ashes of the Slavonic Corps was born the Wagner Group.

Two recruiters for the Slavonic Corps were ultimately jailed in October 2014 for their violation of Article 359. They faced up to eight years imprisonment but were convicted for three. Regular squad members were reportedly unpaid and faced no prosecution in Russia.

Not long after the Slavonic Corps fiasco, the Wagner Group PMC made its appearance on the scene. Near the end of 2014, Wagner was given the instructional role of local Basharite militias. Prior to September 2015, the PMCs were Russia's only pseudo-military presence in Syria.

Wagner and Moran both contributed in 2014 to the Russian War in Donbas; Wagner is known to have fought in Syria since late 2015. One manner of payment to the group is from 25% of the proceeds from captured and secured oil and gas infrastructure in Syria.

In January 2018, Foreign Minister Sergei Lavrov said of PMC employees that legislation was needed to "protect these people", while Duma member Mikhail Yemelyanov authored a bill to do just that "because private military companies are legal in many countries"; continuing: "We wrote in the bill that the defence ministry would coordinate and that participation in armed conflicts would only be with their permission."

In February 2023, it was reported that Gazprom would form a PMC of its own called Fakel. The law "On the Security of Fuel and Energy Facilities" appears now to state that companies in this field "may be granted the right to establish a private security organisation".

The organisation Molfar has investigated 37 private military companies in Russia, and found that all of them are or have been connected to Kremlin. Most of them are also funded by Kremlin. More than half of them are participating in the 2022 Russian invasion of Ukraine. In total, they have activities in 34 different countries. Russian PMCs are involved in oil and mining operations in 19 countries in Africa.

== Other miscellany ==
=== Fatalities ===
By the end of 2012, the number of contractors who had died in Iraq, Afghanistan and Kuwait had reached 3,000.

Contractor fatalities by employer (2001–2011)
| Employer | Subsidiaries | Fatalities |
|---|---|---|
| L3 Communications | Titan Corporation, MPRI | 373 |
| The Supreme Group | Supreme Food Services | 241 |
| Compass Security | | 163 |
| Service Employees International | | 127 |
| DynCorp | DynCorp Technical Services | 101 |
| AEGIS | Aegis Defense Service, Mission Essential Personnel | 89 |

Scholars have studied whether contractor deaths have an effect on the public's "casualty sensitivity" when substituted for military fatalities. Casualty sensitivity refers to the inverse relationship between military deaths and public support for a sustained military engagement. Contractor deaths may account for nearly 30% of total US battlefield losses since the beginning of the wars in Iraq and Afghanistan.

=== UN mercenary report ===
In October 2007, the United Nations released a two-year study that reported that, although hired as "security guards", private contractors performed military duties. A spokesman for the American mission to the UN office in Geneva (UNOG) said that "Accusations that US government-contracted security guards, of whatever nationality, are mercenaries is inaccurate." An observer noted that the difficulty in separating private from public troops means that legal proceedings against these violent non-state actors can be complicated, and stated that contracted combatants carry the legitimacy of the state that hires them.

Demands for specific PSC services have grown to record levels in recent decades, and private firms' capabilities now include an array of services that are vital to the success of on-the-ground war fighting as well as other more traditional stability operations and contingency contracting. While past calls for corporate responsibility have heralded successes such as the Kimberley Process and the Extractive Industries Transparency Initiative in widespread international operations, there has also been a move within the PSC and contingency contracting industries to call for accountability and to implement a code of ethics for the retention of services and operations of such service providers. Existing credible accountability initiatives form a skeleton for governing the conduct of contractors, but much remains to be fleshed out to form a coherent and standardized framework from which to oversee such organizations and activities. Over the last decade there have been a number of initiatives to regulate the private security industry. These include the ISO/PAS 28007:2012 Guidelines for Private Maritime Security Companies and the ANSI/ASIS PSC.1 and PSC.4 standards.

=== ASIS Commission on Standards ===
Founded in 1955, American Society for Industrial Security (ASIS) is a society of individual security professionals dedicated to increasing the effectiveness and productivity of security professionals by developing educational programs and materials. ASIS is an ANSI-accredited Standards Developing Organization, and within ASIS, the ASIS Commission on Standards and Guidelines works with national and international standards-setting organizations and industry representatives to develop voluntary standards and guidelines for security professionals. With funding from the US Department of Defense, the ASIS Commission on Standards is currently promulgating four sets of standards for private security companies.

== See also ==
- List of private military contractors
- List of private security companies
- Private army
- Defense contractor
- Private intelligence agency
- Private security company
- Mercenary

== Sources ==
=== Academic publications ===
- Arnold, Guy. Mercenaries: The Scourge of the Third World. Palgrave Macmillan, 1999. ISBN 978-0-312-22203-1
- Deborah D. Avant. The Market for Force: The Consequences of Privatizing Security. George Washington University, August 2005. ISBN 0-521-61535-6
- Deborah D. Avant and Kara Kingma Neu. 2019. "The Private Security Events Database." Journal of Conflict Resolution.
- Brillstein, Arik: Antiterrorsystem. Engel Publishing 2005
- Brooks, Doug/ Rathgeber, Shawn Lee: The Industry Role in Regulating Private Security Companies, in: Canadian Consortium on Human Security – Security Privatization: Challenges and Opportunities, Vol. 6.3, University of British Columbia, March 2008.
- Simon Chesterman & Chia Lehnardt, eds. From Mercenaries to Market: The Rise and Regulation of Private Military Companies. Oxford: Oxford UP, 2009.
- Niccolò Machiavelli. The Prince. 1532. See ch. 12.
- Amy E. Eckert, Outsourcing War: The Just War Tradition in the Age of Military Privatization, Cornell University Press, 2016.
- Robert Mandel. Armies Without States: The Privatization of Security. Lynne Rienner Publishers, 2002.
- Phelps, Martha Lizabeth (2014). "Doppelgangers of the State: Private Security and Transferable Legitimacy". Politics & Policy. 42 (6): 824–849. doi:10.1111/polp.12100.
- Jon D. Michaels, "Beyond Accountability: The Constitutional, Democratic, and Strategic Problems with Privatizing War," 82 Washington University Law Quarterly 1001 (2004).
- Fred Schreier & Marina Caparini. "Privatising Security: Law, Practice and Governance of Private Military and Security Companies", DCAF Occasional Paper 6, The Geneva Centre for the Democratic Control of Armed Forces, March 2005.
- Filipa Guinote. "Private Military Firms and the State: Sharing Responsibility for Violations of Human Rights and Humanitarian Law", Collection Ricerche, "Series E.MA Awarded thesis", vol. 7, Venice: Marsilio Editori, 2006.
- David Shearer. Private Armies and Military Intervention, April 1998. ISBN 0-19-829440-9
- P. W. Singer. Corporate Warriors: The Rise of the Privatized Military Industry. Cornell University Press, March 2004. ISBN 0-8014-8915-6
- Woolley, Peter J. "Soldiers of Fortune," The Common Review, v. 5, no. 4 (2007), pp. 46–48.
- Petrovic Predrag, Milosevic Marko, Unijat Jelena & Stojanovic Sonja. Private Security Companies – a Friend or a foe? . Centre for Civil-Military Relations, 2008. ISBN 978-86-83543-51-9

=== Non-academic publications ===
- Making A Killing, James Ashcroft. Virgin Books. ISBN 1-85227-311-9
- Licensed to Kill : Privatizing the War on Terror, Robert Young Pelton ISBN 1-4000-9781-9
- Three Worlds Gone Mad: Dangerous Journeys through the War Zones of Africa, Asia, and the South Pacific, Robert Young Pelton, August 2006. ISBN 1-59228-100-1
- An Unorthodox Soldier, Tim Spicer, September 2000. ISBN 1-84018-349-7
- Blackwater: The Rise of the World's Most Powerful Mercenary Army, Jeremy Scahill, Nation Books. February 2007. ISBN 978-1-56025-979-4
- Contractor, Giampiero Spinelli Mursia Editore 2009 ISBN 978-88-425-4390-9
- Guns For Hire: The Inside Story of Freelance Soldiering, Tony Geraghty, Portrait. 2007. ISBN 978-0-7499-5145-0
- Private Security Contractors in Iraq and Afghanistan: Legal Issues, Jennifer K. Elsea, Congressional Research Service, January 7, 2010
- Irak, terre mercenaire : les armées privées remplacent les troupes américaines [Iraq, mercenary land: private armies replace US troops], by Georges-Henri Bricet des Vallons, Favre (Lausanne:Switzerland), January 2010. ISBN 978-2-8289-1095-2. Only in French.
- Dirty Deeds Done Cheap: The Incredible Story of My Life from the SBS to a Hired Gun in Iraq, by Mike Mercer, John Blake. 2009. ISBN 978-1-84454-765-4
