= United Nations Mercenary Convention =

2001 United Nations treaty

The United Nations Mercenary Convention, officially the International Convention against the Recruitment, Use, Financing and Training of Mercenaries, is a 2001 United Nations treaty that prohibits the recruitment, training, use, and financing of mercenaries. At the 72nd plenary meeting on 4 December 1989, the United Nations General Assembly concluded the convention as its resolution 44/34. The convention entered into force on 20 October 2001 and has been ratified by 38 states.

The convention extends on the Geneva Conventions Protocol I which in Article 47(1) states that a mercenary cannot be a lawful combatant or prisoner of war.

== Articles of the Convention ==
=== Article 1 ===
1. A mercenary is any person who:
  - (a) Is specially recruited locally or abroad in order to fight in an armed conflict;
  - (b) Is motivated to take part in the hostilities essentially by the desire for private gain and, in fact, is promised, by or on behalf of a party to the conflict, material compensation substantially in excess of that promised or paid to combatants of similar rank and functions in the armed forces of that party;
  - (c) Is neither a national of a party to the conflict nor a resident of territory controlled by a party to the conflict;
  - (d) Is not a member of the armed forces of a party to the conflict; and
  - (e) Has not been sent by a State which is not a party to the conflict on official duty as a member of its armed forces.
2. A mercenary is also any person who, in any other situation:
  - (a) Is specially recruited locally or abroad for the purpose of participating in a concerted act of violence aimed at:
    - (i) Overthrowing a Government or otherwise undermining the constitutional order of a State; or
    - (ii) Undermining the territorial integrity of a State;
  - (b) Is motivated to take part therein essentially by the desire for significant private gain and is prompted by the promise or payment of material compensation;
  - (c) Is neither a national nor a resident of the State against which such an act is directed;
  - (d) Has not been sent by a State on official duty; and
  - (e) Is not a member of the armed forces of the State on whose territory the act is undertaken.

=== Article 2 ===
Any person who recruits, uses, finances or trains mercenaries, as defined in article 1 of the present Convention, commits an offence for the purposes of the Convention.

=== Article 3 ===
1. A mercenary, as defined in article 1 of the present Convention, who participates directly in hostilities or in a concerted act of violence, as the case may be, commits an offence for the purposes of the Convention.
2. Nothing in this article limits the scope of application of article 4 of the present Convention.

=== Article 4 ===
An offence is committed by any person who:

- (a) Attempts to commit one of the offences set forth in the present Convention;
- (b) Is the accomplice of a person who commits or attempts to commit any of the offences set forth in the present Convention.

=== Article 5 ===
1. States Parties shall not recruit, use, finance or train mercenaries and shall prohibit such activities in accordance with the provisions of the present Convention.
2. States Parties shall not recruit, use, finance or train mercenaries for the purpose of opposing the legitimate exercise of the inalienable right of peoples to self-determination, as recognized by international law, and shall take, in conformity with international law, the appropriate measures to prevent the recruitment, use, financing or training of mercenaries for that purpose.
3. They shall make the offences set forth in the present Convention punishable by appropriate penalties which take into account the grave nature of those offences.

=== Article 6 ===
States Parties shall co-operate in the prevention of the offences set forth in the present Convention, particularly by:

- (a) Taking all practicable measures to prevent preparations in their respective territories for the commission of those offences within or outside their territories, including the prohibition of illegal activities of persons, groups and organizations that encourage, instigate, organize or engage in the perpetration of such offences;
- (b) Co-ordinating the taking of administrative and other measures as appropriate to prevent the commission of those offences.

=== Article 7 ===
States Parties shall co-operate in taking the necessary measures for the implementation of the present Convention.

=== Article 8 ===
Any State Party having reason to believe that one of the offences set forth in the present Convention has been, is being or will be committed shall, in accordance with its national law, communicate the relevant information, as soon as it comes to its knowledge, directly or through the Secretary-General of the United Nations, to the States Parties affected.

=== Article 9 ===
1. Each State Party shall take such measures as may be necessary to establish its jurisdiction over any of the offences set forth in the present Convention which are committed:
  - (a) In its territory or on board a ship or aircraft registered in that State;
  - (b) By any of its nationals or, if that State considers it appropriate, by those stateless persons who have their habitual residence in that territory.
2. Each State Party shall likewise take such measures as may be necessary to establish its jurisdiction over the offences set forth in articles 2, 3 and 4 of the present Convention in cases where the alleged offender is present in its territory and it does note extradite him to any of the States mentioned in paragraph 1 of this article.
3. The present Convention does not exclude any criminal jurisdiction exercised in accordance with international law.

=== Article 10 ===
1. Upon being satisfied that the circumstances so warrant, any State Party in whose territory the alleged offender is present shall, in accordance with its laws, take him into custody or take such other measures to ensure his presence for such time as is necessary to enable any criminal or extradition proceedings to be instituted. The State Party shall immediately make a preliminary inquiry into the facts.
2. When a State Party, pursuant to this article, has taken a person into custody or has taken such other measures referred to in paragraph 1 of this article, it shall notify without delay either directly or through the Secretary-General of the United Nations:
  - (a) The State Party where the offence was committed;
  - (b) The State Party against which the offence has been directed or attempted.
  - (c) The State Party of which the natural or juridical person against whom the offence has been directed or attempted is a national;
  - (d) The State Party of which the alleged offender is a national or if he is a stateless person, in whose territory he has his habitual residence;
  - (e) Any other interested State Party which it considers it appropriate to notify.
3. Any person regarding whom the measures referred to in paragraph 1 of this article are being taken shall be entitled:
  - (a) To communicate without delay with the nearest appropriate representative of the State of which he is a national or which is otherwise entitled to protect his rights or, if he is a stateless person, the State in whose territory he has his habitual residence;
  - (b) To be visited by a representative of that State.
4. The provisions of paragraph 3 of this article shall be without prejudice to the right of any State Party having a claim to jurisdiction in accordance with article 9, paragraph 1 (b), to invite the International Committee of the Red Cross to communicate with and visit the alleged offender.
5. The State which makes the preliminary inquiry contemplated in paragraph 1 of ths article shall promptly report its findings to the States referred to in paragraph 2 of this article and indicate whether it intends to exercise jurisdiction.

=== Article 11 ===
Any person regarding whom proceedings are being carried out in connection with any of the offences set forth in the present Convention shall be guaranteed at all stages of the proceedings fair treatment and all the rights and guarantees provided for in the law of the State in question. Applicable norms of international law should be taken into account.

=== Article 12 ===
The State Party in whose territory the alleged offender is found shall, if it does not extradite him, be obliged, without exception whatsoever and whether or not the offence was committed in its territory, to submit the case to its competent authorities for the purpose of prosecution, through proceedings in accordance with the laws of that State. Those authorities shall take their decision in the same manner as in the case of any other offence of a grave nature under the law of that State.

=== Article 13 ===
1. States Parties shall afford one another the greatest measure of assistance in connection with criminal proceedings brought in respect of the offences set forth in the present Convention, including the supply of all evidence at their disposal necessary for the proceedings. The law of the State whose assistance is requested shall apply in all cases.
2. The provisions of paragraph 1 of this article shall not affect obligations concerning mutual judicial assistance embodied in any other treaty.

=== Article 14 ===
The State Party where the alleged offender is prosecuted shall in accordance with its laws communicate the final outcome of the proceedings to the Secretary-General of the United Nations, who shall transmit the information to the other States concerned.

=== Article 15 ===
1. The offences set forth in articles 2, 3 and 4 of the present Convention shall be deemed to be included as extraditable offences in any extradition treaty existing between States Parties. States Parties undertake to include such offences as extraditable offences in every extradition treaty to be concluded between them.
2. If a State Party which makes extradition conditional on the existence of a treaty receives a request for extradition from another State Party with which it has no extradition treaty, it may at its option consider the present Convention as the legal basis for extradition in respect of those offences. Extradition shall be subject to the other conditions provided by the law of the requested State.
3. States Parties which do not make extradition conditional on the existence of a treaty shall recognize those offences as extraditable offences between themselves, subject to the conditions provided by the law of the requested State.
4. The offences shall be treated, for the purpose of extradition between States Parties, as if they had been committed not only in the place in which they occurred but also in the territories of the State required to establish their jurisdiction in accordance with article 9 of the present Convention.
5. The provisions of paragraph 1 of this article shall not affect obligations concerning mutual judicial assistance embodied in any other treaty.

=== Article 16 ===
The present Convention shall be applied without prejudice to:

- (a) The rules relating to the international responsibility of States;
- (b) The law of armed conflict and international humanitarian law, including the provisions relating to the status of combatant or of prisoner of war.

=== Article 17 ===
1. Any dispute between two or more States Parties concerning the interpretation or application of the present Convention which is not settled by negotiation shall, at the request of one of them, be submitted to arbitration. If, within six months from the date of the request for arbitration, the parties are unable to agree on the organization of the arbitration, any one of those parties may refer the dispute to the International Court of Justice by a request in conformity with the Statute of the Court.
2. Each State may, at the time of signature or ratification of the present Convention or accession thereto, declare that it does not consider itself bound by paragraph 1 of this article. The other States Parties shall not be bound by paragraph 1 of this article with respect to any State party which has made such a reservation.
3. Any State Party which has made a reservation in accordance with paragraph 2 of this article may at any time withdraw that reservation by notification to the Secretary-General of the United Nations.

=== Article 18 ===
1. The present Convention shall be open for signature by all States until 31 December 1990 at United Nations Headquarters in New York.
2. The present Convention shall be subject to ratification. The instruments of ratification shall be deposited with the Secretary-General of the United Nations.
3. The present Convention shall remain open for accession by any State. The instruments of accession shall be deposited with the Secretary-General of the United Nations.

=== Article 19 ===
1. The present Convention shall enter into force on the thirtieth day following the date of deposit of the twenty-second instrument of ratification or accession with the Secretary-General of the United Nations.
2. For each State ratifying or acceding to the Convention after the deposit of the twenty-second instrument of ratification or accession, the Convention shall enter into force on the thirtieth day after deposit by such State of its instrument of ratification or accession.

=== Article 20 ===
1. Any State Party may denounce the present Convention by written notification to the Secretary-General of the United Nations.
2. Denunciation shall take effect one year after the date on which the notification is received by the Secretary-General of the United Nations.

=== Article 21 ===
The original of the present Convention, of which the Arabic, Chinese, English, French, Russian and Spanish texts are equally authentic, shall be deposited with the Secretary-General of the United Nations, who shall send certified copies thereof to all States.

In witness whereof the undersigned, being duly authorized thereto by their respective Governments, have signed the present Convention.

== Signatories and parties ==
As of August 2021, the convention had been ratified by 38 states, and signed but not ratified by 9 states.

Below are the states that have signed, ratified or acceded to the convention.

Country	Signing date	Ratification date	Notes
Italy	February 5, 1990	August 21, 1995	
Ivory Coast		January 2, 2025	
Seychelles		March 12, 1990	
Zaire	March 20, 1990		Signed as Zaire; successor state is the Democratic Republic of the Congo.
Nigeria	April 4, 1990		
Maldives	July 17, 1990	September 11, 1991	
P.R. Congo	July 20, 1990		Signed as the People's Republic of the Congo; successor state is the Republic of the Congo.
Ukraine	September 21, 1990	September 13, 1993	Signed as the Ukrainian Soviet Socialist Republic.
Morocco	October 5, 1990		
Suriname	February 27, 1990	August 10, 1990	
Uruguay	November 20, 1990	July 14, 1999	
Germany	December 12, 1990		
Barbados	December 13, 1990	July 10, 1992	
Belarus	December 13, 1990	May 28, 1997	Signed as the Byelorussian Soviet Socialist Republic.
Romania	December 17, 1990		
Cameroon	December 21, 1990	January 1, 1996	
Poland	December 28, 1990		
Togo		February 25, 1991	
Angola	December 28, 1990		
Cyprus		July 8, 1993	
Georgia		June 8, 1995	
Turkmenistan		September 18, 1996	
Azerbaijan		April 12, 1997	
Saudi Arabia		April 14, 1997	With reservations.
Uzbekistan		January 19, 1998	
Mauritania		February 9, 1998	
Qatar		March 26, 1999	
Senegal		July 9, 1999	
Croatia		March 27, 2000	
Libya		September 22, 2000	Signed as the Libyan Arab Jamahiriya.
Serbia	March 12, 2001	January 14, 2016	Signed as the Federal Republic of Yugoslavia.
Costa Rica		September 20, 2001	
Mali		April 12, 2002	
Belgium		May 5, 2002	With reservations.
Guinea		June 18, 2003	
New Zealand		September 22, 2004	
Liberia		September 16, 2005	
Moldova		February 28, 2006	With reservations.
Montenegro	October 23, 2006		
Peru		March 23, 2007	
Cuba		September 2, 2007	
Syria		January 19, 2008	With reservations.
Venezuela		November 12, 2013	
Ecuador		December 12, 2016	
Equatorial Guinea		January 21, 2019	
Honduras		April 1, 2008	
Armenia		November 23, 2020	With reservations.

Several of the states that ratified the agreement are however signatories of the Montreux document which on the contrary of the afore-written convention, does not make illegal the use of mercenaries but gives a document about the use of mercenaries including "good practises", the agreement having no sanctions or legal constraints tied to it.

== See also ==
- Montreux Document – a non-constraining agreement between countries about Mercenary use with a side legal volley about non-military private security.
- Private military company
- Unlawful combatant § Mercenaries
