= Eeben Barlow =

South African military officer

- Born: Northern Rhodesia (present-day Zambia)
- Military career
- Rank: Lieutenant-Colonel
- Units: Special Forces 32 Battalion and Civil Cooperation Bureau
- Commands: second-in-command of Special Forces 32 Battalion
- Known for: Founder of Executive Outcomes

Eeben Barlow is a South African military veteran and businessman.

He previously served as the second-in-command of the 32 Battalion. He founded the private military contractor (PMC) Executive Outcomes (EO) in 1989, and was involved in providing counter-insurgency as well as peacekeeping forces in Africa and Asia. Barlow resigned from Executive Outcomes in July 1997 and the company closed its doors on 31 December 1998. Some consider Eeben Barlow the grandfather of modern private military companies as the founder of Executive Outcomes.

== Early life and education ==
Born in Northern Rhodesia (present-day Zambia), Barlow started his schooling in Francistown, Botswana and moved to South Africa in the mid-1960s.

== Military background ==
He joined the SADF in 1972. He was commissioned in the SA Corps of Engineers where he served as the Engineer Commander for the 53 and 54 Infantry Battalions in the South West African Operational area. Barlow was recruited to serve with 32 Battalion Special Forces in Angola. Although 32 Battalion operated independently, the SADF was supporting the UNITA rebel movement (funded by Washington and Pretoria). Subsequently, he was assigned to SADF's Directorate of Military Intelligence and then to the CCB where he commanded Region 5, an area that encompassed Europe and the Middle East.

== Role in Apartheid South Africa ==
In the mid-1980s a large number of South African militants (predominantly black) escaped the country by crossing South Africa’s borders into Eswatini, Botswana, Mozambique, Malawi, Zimbabwe or Zambia where they were granted refuge and amnesty. Many of these refugees received military training in the USSR and its satellite states for the purpose of using force to overthrow the white South African apartheid government.

As a member of Military Intelligence, Barlow was tasked to infiltrate and penetrate these resistance groups to gather intelligence on their activities and planning. Later, as a member of the CCB, Barlow’s region was tasked with disruption and intelligence gathering operations in Europe and the Middle East.

== Private military company ==
In 1989, Barlow established the company Executive Outcomes (EO). Executive Outcomes initially trained SADF Special Forces in covert operations and intelligence gathering. He was also contracted to establish and train a covert group for the De Beers diamond company in Botswana Debswana with the aim of infiltrating and penetrating the illegal diamond-buying and smuggling syndicates.

In 1993, Barlow’s Executive Outcomes was contracted to provide security for Ranger Oil in the northern Angolan town of Soyo where Ranger Oil were trying to recover drilling equipment stored on the harbour. The harbour, in turn, was under UNITA rebel control. To achieve this, Barlow recruited men who had been retrenched from the SADF elite units as well as Koevoet. Due to this contract, Executive Outcomes became a target for a campaign led mainly by South Africa’s Military Intelligence Division, the Department of Foreign Affairs and the media.

Shortly thereafter, Executive Outcomes was awarded the contract to assist the Angolan Armed Forces (FAA) with training, strategic and tactical advice in an effort to end the war with UNITA. Despite a sustained negative campaign against it, Executive Outcomes accomplished its contract and within a year, UNITA had virtually been destroyed on the battlefield. This led to the signing of the Lusaka Protocols.

Executive Outcomes likewise assisted the Sierra Leonean government in destroying the rebel movement RUF in that country.

Barlow and his company also assisted the Indonesian Special Forces in the hostage-release operation in Irian Jaya in 1996.

Barlow was a keynote speaker during the establishment of the British Army’s rapid reaction forces. He also delivered a paper on the role of PMCs to the US Department of Defence in Washington.

Barlow publicly made it known that he supported a bill to regulate PMCs and Executive Outcomes provided several guidelines to the South African government during the formulation of a bill to regulate such companies.

Executive Outcomes was one of the first companies to be awarded a licence by the South African government to operate as a government-approved PMC.

Appointed Chairman of STTEP International in 2009. In 2014, former President Goodluck Jonathan of Nigeria hired STTEP to provide training and tactics to the Nigerian Army for fighting the Boko Harem terrorist organization. The training was showing progressing with the start of taking back land Boko Harem had newly occupied. STTEP warned the next President, Muhammadu Buhari, with "numerous intelligence warnings. These warnings covered the implications of not allowing the 72 MSF to annihilate BH in Borno province; the plans by Boko Harem to re-arm and escalate their activities; the implications of regional spill-over, the impact on the armed forces; and so forth." President Muhammadu Buhari narrative was that the Boko Harem were defeated. On 18 November 2015, 157 Task Force Battalion of the Nigerian Army was overrun causing the death of at least 44 soldiers.

Eeben Barlow, resigned as chairman from STTEP on 30 September 2020.

== Books ==
- Executive Outcome: Against All Odds (2010)
- Composite Warfare: The Conduct of Successful Ground Force Operations in Africa (2019)
- The War for Africa: Conflict, Crime, Corruption and Foreign Interests (2020)
- Human Intelligence: Supporting Composite Warfare Operations in Africa (2023)
