= List of mercenaries =

This is a list of mercenaries. It includes foreign volunteers, private military contractors, and other "soldiers of fortune".

== Antiquity ==
| Name | Life | Years active | Allegiance (Organization) | Comments |
|---|---|---|---|---|
| Alexon | | 250 BC | Carthaginian Empire | Greek mercenary from Achaea who served in the Carthaginian garrison at Lilybaeum while it was besieged by the Romans during the First Punic War. Foiled a plot by Gallic mercenaries to surrender Lilybaeum to the enemy. |
| Autaritus | d. 238 BC | | Carthaginian Empire | Leader of the Gallic mercenaries in the Carthaginian army during the First Punic War. He turned against Carthage in the Mercenary War and was crucified by Hamilcar Barca after his capture. |
| Charidemus | d. 333 BC | 367–333 BC | Athens | Greek mercenary leader who served Athens, Thrace and Rhodes. |
| Clearchus of Sparta | | 411–401 BC | | Spartan general and mercenary leader who joined Cyrus the Younger in his attempt to seize the Persian throne from Artaxerxes III. |
| Diogenes of Judea | | | Hasmonean Kingdom | Jewish soldier in the service of Alexander Jannaeus. In revenge for the support of certain Pharisees for Demetrius III of Syria's invasion of Judea, Diogenes advised Alexander to crucify 800 Pharisee scholars in front of their families. |
| Memnon of Rhodes | 380–333 BC | 334–333 BC | First Persian Empire | Commander of the Greek mercenaries in the service of Darius III when Alexander the Great invaded Persia in 334 BC. |
| Mathos | d. 237 BC | 241–237 BC | Carthaginian Empire | Berber mercenary leader who fought for Carthage in Sicily during the First Punic War. He later led a revolt against Carthage during the Mercenary War but was defeated by Hamilcar Barca and crucified. |
| Mentor of Rhodes | 385–340 BC | 358–340 BC | | Greek mercenary who fought both for and against Artaxerxes III of Persia. He is also known as the first husband of Barsine, who later became mistress to Alexander the Great. |
| Naravas | | | Carthaginian Empire | Berber mercenary leader who served Carthage during the First Punic War. Unlike his fellow mercenaries, he remained loyal to Carthage during the Mercenary War and helped Hamilcar Barca crush the rebel leaders. |
| Phalaecus | d. 343 BC | | | Deposed ruler of Phocis who formed a mercenary army and fought for Knossos in Crete. |
| Proxenus of Boeotia | 431–401 BC | 401 BC | First Persian Empire | A friend of Cyrus the Younger and Xenophon, he was one of the four ill-fated generals who accompanied Clearchus of Sparta to Tissaphernes. |
| Pythagoras the Spartan | | 401 BC | First Persian Empire | Spartan admiral hired to command the first fleet of Cyrus the Younger during his campaign to claim the Persian throne. |
| Socrates of Achaea | 436–401 BC | 401 BC | | Greek mercenary general from Achaea who traveled to Persia to fight at the Battle of Cunaxa. |
| Xanthippus | | 255–245 BC | Carthaginian Empire | Spartan mercenary general hired by the Carthaginians to aid in their war against the Romans during the First Punic War. Credited for developing military tactics used by Carthage, he led Carthaginian soldiers into the battle of Tunis where the Roman expeditionary force was routed and the Roman consul Marcus Atilius Regulus was captured. |
| Xenias of Arcadia | | | First Persian Empire | Greek commander of mercenaries in the service of Cyrus the Younger. |
| Xenophon | 430–354 BC | 401–371 BC | Peloponnesian League | Athenian-born general who served Sparta during the Peloponnesian War. |

== Medieval ==
| Name | Life | Years active | Allegiance (Organization) | Comments |
|---|---|---|---|---|
| Arnaud de Cervole | 1320–1366 | ?-1366 | Papal States; Kingdom of France | French mercenary soldier and brigand of the Hundred Years' War. He was murdered by his own men while planning with Pope Urban V to lead a new Crusade to the Holy Land. |
| (Moravia) Bernard Szumborski | d. 1470 | 1454–1470 | Teutonic Knights | Moravian knight and who led a mercenary army during the Thirteen Years' War. He was hired by the Teutonic Knights during the Battle of Chojnice and was later sent to relieve the besieged city three years later. Szumborski committed a number of atrocities during the conflict and was eventually poisoned. |
| (North Sea Empire) Bolli Bollason | | | Byzantine Empire | Viking mercenary who became the first-known West Norseman in the Varangian Guard. |
| (Connacht) Domnall na Madhmann Mac Suibhne | | | | Gallowglass associate of Rath Glas. |
| Eustace the Monk | 1170–1217 | 1205–1212 | England | French mercenary and pirate who raided the Normandy coast on behalf of King John of England until his defection to France in 1212. He supported the rebel faction during the First Barons' War and ferried Prince Louis across the English Channel in 1216. He was executed after his capture at the Battle of Sandwich the following year. |
| (Castile (historical region)) Frederick of Castile | 1223–1277 | 1260–1270 | Hafsid Dynasty | After his exile from Castile, Frederick served under his brother Henry as a knight errant in the service of Tunisian emir al-Mustansir. |
| Gérard d'Athée | | 1211–1215 | England | French mercenary employed by King John of England to control southern Wales. |
| (Castile (historical region)) Henry of Castile the Senator | 1230–1303 | 1259–1268 | Hafsid Dynasty | A son of Ferdinand III of Castile, Henry commanded Spanish knights in the service of Tunisian emir al-Mustansir. He also assisted his cousin, Charles of Anjou, becoming King of Sicily in 1266. |
| Hereward the Wake | 1035–1072 | | Flanders | English rebel leader and outlaw who resisted the Norman conquest of England. Prior to the Norman invasion, Hereward was a mercenary in the service of Baldwin V, Count of Flanders. |
| (Genoa) Isnardo Guarco | 1380–1458 | | | Genoese politician and mercenary leader. |
| John Hawkwood | 1323–1394 | 1360–1392 | Florence | |
| Lobar the Wolf | | | | Leader of Brabançon mercenaries that fought in numerous battles all across Europe in the latter half of the twelfth century. |
| (Navarre) Martin Algai | 1100s-1212 | 1196-1211 | England | Navarrese mercenary captain who fought for King Richard I and King John of England. Later fought for Simon de Montfort in the Albigensian Crusade. |
| (Bavaria) Martin Schwartz | | 1475–1487 | | Germanic mercenary who fought for Lambert Simnel, a Yorkist pretender to the English throne. |
| (Wales) Owain Lawgoch | 1330–1378 | 1369–1378 | France | Welsh soldier who served in Spain, France, Alsace, and Switzerland. He led a Free Company fighting for the French against the English in the Hundred Years' War. |
| (Portugal) Peter I, Count of Urgell | 1187–1258 | | Morocco | Son of King Sancho I of Portugal who commanded a mercenary army of Christian exiles and adventurers in the service of Yusuf II, the Almohad Caliph of Morocco. |
| (Normandy) Rainulf Drengot | | 1016–1045 | | Norman adventurer and mercenary in southern Italy. |
| (Normandy) Robert Guiscard | 1015–1085 | 1047–1085 | | Norman adventurer remembered for the conquest of southern Italy and Sicily. |
| (Spain) Rodrigo de Villandrando | | 1410–1443 | Gascony | Spanish mercenary leader in Gascony during the final phase of the Hundred Years' War. |
| (Spain) Roger Deslaur | | | | Spanish almogàver in the service of Walter V of Brienne. One of the few knights to survive the bloody Battle of Halmyros, he became a member of the Catalan Company after his capture. |
| (Kingdom of Sicily) Roger de Flor | 1267–1305 | | Byzantine Empire | Sicilian adventurer and condottiere active in Aragonese Sicily, Italy and the Byzantine Empire. |
| Sultan Husayn Mirza Bayqara | 1438–1506 | 1457–1470 | | Timurid ruler of Herat. During Bayqara's exile from his homeland, he served as a mercenary soldier to Sultan Sanjar Mirza of Merv. |
| (Scotland) Thomas of Galloway | | 1212–1228 | England; Scotland | Gall-Gaidhil prince and adventurer who was employed as an agent for his brother Alan of Galloway as well as English and Scottish kings. |
| Werner von Urslingen | 1308–1354 | | Holy Roman Empire | Germanic mercenary in the service of the Holy Roman Empire. |
| (Normandy) William Iron Arm | | 1035–1046 | | Norman adventurer who was the founder of the Hauteville family. |
| (Flanders) William of Ypres | 1090–1164 | 1139–1154 | | Flemish mercenary commander who served as Stephen of England's chief lieutenant during The Anarchy. |

== Early modern ==
| Name | Life | Years active | Allegiance (Organization) | Comments |
|---|---|---|---|---|
| (Ottoman Empire) Selman Reis | | 1515–1538 | Mamluk Sultanate | Ottoman admiral and corsair who commanded a group of 2,000 armed Levantines for the Mamluk navy during the Portuguese–Mamluk naval war. |
| (Switzerland) Arnold Winkelried | d. 1522 | 1514–1522 | Milan | A notorious mercenary leader during the early 16th century, Winkelried was knighted by the Milanese duke Maximilian Sforza in 1514. He instigated by Cardinal Matthäus Schiner to engage in the skirmish that led to the disastrous Battle of Marignano that same year. Winkelried later entered French service and was killed in single combat by his former commander Georg von Frundsberg at the Battle of Bicocca. |
| (Serbia) Sava Temišvarac | | 1594–1612 | Holy Roman Empire | Serbian military commander in the service of the Transylvania and then the Holy Roman Empire during the Long Turkish War. He and Bishop Teodor of Vršac led the Uprising in Banat in 1594. |
| (Norway) Enno Brandrøk | 1538–1571 | 1557–1571 | Denmark; England; Scotland; Spain | Son of Norwegian-born privateer and admiral Kristoffer Trondson, Brandrøk served as a Landsknecht in Denmark, England, Scotland and Spain. |
| Migliorino Ubaldini | | | Scotland | Italian military engineer working in Scotland. He designed new fortifications at the entrances of Edinburgh Castle, Dunbar Castle, and possibly the walled town of Leith. |
| (Hungary) György Dózsa | 1470–1514 | | | Székely man-at-arms who led a peasants' revolt in the Kingdom of Hungary. Prior to the revolt, he was a soldier of fortune during the wars against the Ottoman Empire |
| (Greece) Thomas of Argos | | 1545–1546 | Kingdom of England | Commanded a battalion of Greek stratioti who served as mercenaries with the English army during Henry VIII's wars against Scotland. |
| (Greece) Ioan Iacob Heraclid | 1511–1563 | 1551–1561 | Holy Roman Empire | A Greek soldier of fortune who fought in the Holy Roman Empire armies of Charles V in his war against Henry II of France. Heraclid seized the throne of Moldova while in the service of Voivode Alexandru Lăpușneanu and, as the Protestant monarch in Eastern Europe, ruled for two years before his murder by Ștefan Tomșa. |
| (Netherlands) Maarten Schenck van Nydeggen | 1543–1589 | 1578–1589 | Netherlands; Spain | Dutch nobleman who left the Spanish Empire to join the Dutch Republic. |
| Götz von Berlichingen | 1480–1562 | 1498–1544 | | Imperial knight and mercenary active in numerous campaigns during a period of 47 years. |
| Ernst von Mansfeld | 1580–1626 | | | A son of Count Peter Ernst von Mansfeld, Ernst von Mansfeld was a noted mercenary commander during the Thirty Years' War |
| Georg von Frundsberg | 1473–1528 | 1492–1527 | | Landsknecht commander in the service of the Imperial House of Habsburg. |
| (Naples) Giorgio Basta | 1544–1607 | | Holy Roman Empire | Neapolitan general employed by Rudolf II, Holy Roman Emperor to command Habsburg forces in the Long War. |
| (Veneto) Lucrezio Gravisi | 1558–1613 | 1574– | Prussia; Portugal; Spain | Venetian freelance soldier and knight who served in Muscovy, Prussia, Portugal and Spain. |
| (Wales) Roger Williams | 1540–1595 | 1557–1594 | | Welsh soldier of fortune and military theorist. |
| (Ottoman Empire) Osman Pazvantoğlu | 1758–1807 | | | Ottoman soldier who led a mercenary army against Sultan Selim III. |
| (France) René Descartes | 1596–1650 | | | Fought for both Protestant Maurice of Nassau and Catholic Maximilian I during the Thirty Years' War. |
| (Switzerland) Sebastian Peregrin Zwyer | 1597–1661 | 1612–1642 | Milan; Spain | In his 30-year career, Zwyer served as a mercenary soldier in the service of Spain and Milan, the Habsburg emperors Ferdinand II and Ferdinand III during the Thirty Years' War, and in northern Italy. |
| (Switzerland) Sigmund von Erlach | 1614–1699 | | France | Swiss mercenary commander in the services of Bernard of Saxe-Weimar and France during the Thirty Years War. |
| (Switzerland) Kaspar von Silenen | | 1506–1517 | | First Commander of the Pontifical Swiss Guard. |
| (Corsica) Sampiero Corso | 1498–1567 | 1512–1567 | France | A condottiero mercenary at age 14, Corso served the Medici family and Pope Clement VII and the French House of Valois during the early 16th century. |
| (United Kingdom) Robert Murray | d. 1719 | | Netherlands | Scottish soldier and son of Sir Robert Murray, Lord Provost of Edinburgh. A veteran of the Nine Years' War, Murray was an officer in a Scots regiment for the Dutch States Army. |
| (United States) John Parker Boyd | 1764–1830 | 1793–1808 | | A soldier of fortune who served in the army of the Nizam of Hyderabad in Central India. |
| (United States) George Rogers Clark | 1752–1818 | 1793–1794 | France | Leader of the Kentucky militia during the American Revolutionary War. After the war, Clark offered his services to France and planned a campaign with ambassador Edmond-Charles Genêt to drive the Spanish out of the Mississippi Valley. |
| (England) Rowland York | d. 1588 | 1572–1588 | Netherlands; Spain | English soldier of fortune who served under Humphrey Gilbert and Robert Dudley, 1st Earl of Leicester in the Spanish Netherlands during the Eighty Years' War. York later betrayed the Earl by turning over the Zutphen sconce to the enemy and accepting an offer to command lancers in Spanish service. |
| (France) Pontus De la Gardie | 1520–1585 | | Denmark; Sweden | French nobleman in the service of Denmark and Sweden. |
| (England) Thomas Stukley | 1520–1578 | 1551–1578 | France | English mercenary who fought in France, Ireland and Morocco. |
| (England) Simon Harcourt | 1603–1642 | 1619–1636 | Netherlands | English soldier of fortune in the service of the Prince of Orange. |
| (Scotland) John Ruthven | | 1627–1638 | Denmark; Sweden | Scottish military officer who served in Denmark and Sweden during the Thirty Years' War. |
| (Scotland) Patrick Ruthven, 1st Earl of Forth | 1573–1651 | 1609–1637 | Sweden | Scottish nobleman and diplomat who served Gustavus Adolphus during the Thirty Years' War. |
| (Scotland) George Sinclair | 1580–1612 | 1607–1612 | Sweden | Scottish mercenary who fought for Gustavus Adolphus of Sweden in the Kalmar War. He and his men were ambushed and killed by Norwegian peasant militia at the Battle of Kringen. |
| (Scotland) William Baillie | | | Sweden | Scottish professional soldier who commanded a regiment under Gustavus Adolphus of Sweden. |
| (Scotland) Mark Alexander Boyd | 1562–1601 | 1587– | France | Scottish poet and soldier of fortune who took part in the religious wars of France. |
| (Scotland) Sir James Ramsay | 1589–1638 | 1603–1638 | Sweden | Scottish soldier, known as "Black Ramsay", who served Gustavus Adolphus, during the Thirty Years' War. |
| (Bavaria) Peter Hagendorf | | 1625–1649 | Holy Roman Empire | German mercenary soldier in the Thirty Years' War. His wartime diary is credited for giving a unique historic record of the life in the contemporary army from the viewpoint of a simple Landsknecht. |
| (Scotland) Paul Menesius | 1637–1694 | 1658–1694 | Russian Empire | Scottish soldier and diplomat in the service of the Tsar Alexis of Russia. |
| (Scotland) Robert Douglas, Count of Skenninge | 1611–1662 | 1627–1662 | Sweden | Scottish cavalry general in Swedish service during the Thirty Years' War and Swedish-Polish wars. |
| (Scotland) William Drummond, 1st Viscount Strathallan | 1617–1688 | 1655–1665 | Russian Empire | Scottish soldier and politician who served as Lieutenant-General in the Muscovite army. |
| (Scotland) Patrick Gordon | 1635–1699 | 1655–1699 | Russian Empire | Scottish general and rear admiral in the service of Peter the Great. |
| (Scotland) James Francis Edward Keith | 1696–1758 | 1726–1758 | Prussia; Russian Empire; Spain | Scottish Jacobite who became a mercenary after the failed attempt to restore the Stuart Monarchy in Britain. He initially fought for the Spanish and Russian Empires before serving in the Prussian army under Frederick the Great. He eventually rose to the rank of field marshal and was killed during the Seven Years' War at the Battle of Hochkirk. |
| (Scotland) David Leslie, 1st Lord Newark | 1600–1682 | 1630–1640 | Sweden | Fought for the Swedish army of Gustavus Adolphus as a professional soldier during the Thirty Years' War. |
| (Scotland) Alexander Leslie, 1st Earl of Leven | 1582–1661 | 1605–1637 | Netherlands; Sweden | Scottish soldier in Dutch and Swedish service. |
| (Scotland) James Lumsden | 1598–1660 | 1632–1639 | Sweden | Scottish soldier who served in the Swedish army of Gustavus Adolphus during the Thirty Years' War. |
| (Scotland) Anders Mowatt of Hugoland | 1535–1611 | 1587–1610 | Denmark | Scottish merchant who served as an admiral in the Danish Navy under Christian IV of Denmark. |
| (Scotland) Samuel Cockburn | 1574–1621 | | Sweden | Scottish soldier who participated in the Swedish civil war between Sigismund Vasa and Duke Karl IX. |
| (Scotland) Andrew Rutherford, 1st Earl of Teviot | d. 1664 | | France | Scottish soldier who served in the French army of Louis XIV during the Thirty Years' War. |
| (Province of Hanover) Anthony Pohlmann | | | United Kingdom | Hanoverian soldier who served in the armies of the British East India Company and Daulat Scindia. |
| (United Kingdom) Donald Cameron of Lochiel | 1700–1748 | | | Scottish Highland chieftain involved in the Jacobite rising of 1745. |
| Baron Munchausen | 1720–1797 | 1735–1760 | Russian Empire | Nobleman who fought for the Russian Empire in the Russo-Turkish War. |
| (Republic of Ireland) Alejandro O'Reilly | 1722–1794 | 1762–1794 | Spain | An Irish Jaboite who left Ireland during the Flight of the Wild Geese to fight in foreign Catholic armies. He entered Spanish service and rose to become a military reformer, brigadier general and governor of colonial Louisiana. |
| (United Kingdom) Robert Douglas | 1727–1809 | 1778–1794 | Netherlands | Scottish-born soldier who served as a major-general in Dutch service. He was governor of the garrison city 's-Hertogenbosch 1784 to 1794. |
| (Republic of Ireland) John Sherlock | 1705–1794 | 1727–1775 | Spain | Irish-born brigadier general of the Spanish Empire's Ultonia Regiment. He successfully defended Melilla during a 100-day siege by Moroccan troops. |
| (Republic of Ireland) George Thomas | 1756–1802 | 1781–1798 | | Irish mercenary who was active in 18th-century India. From 1798 to 1801, he ruled a small kingdom in India, until his defeat and capture by Scindia's army under French general Pierre Cuillier-Perron. |
| (United Kingdom) John Ross | 1777–1856 | 1808–1812 | Sweden | British naval officer and Arctic explorer who served in the Swedish Navy. |
| (France) Jean-François Allard | 1785–1839 | 1815–1839 | Persia; Punjab | French soldier and adventurer in the service of the Abbas Mirza and Ranjit Singh. |
| (United Kingdom) Gregor MacGregor | 1786–1845 | 1812–1819 | | Scottish adventurer and confidence trickster attempted to draw British and French investors and settlers to "Poyais", a fictional Central American territory he claimed to rule as "Cazique". |
| (United Kingdom) John Mackenzie, Lord MacLeod | 1727–1789 | 1750–1770 | Prussia; Sweden | Scottish Jacobite and soldier of fortune in the service of Sweden and Prussia. |
| (United Kingdom) John Forbes | 1733–1808 | 1762–1808 | Portugal | Scottish general in Portuguese service. |
| (France) Benoît de Boigne | 1751–1830 | 1768–1796 | Punjab | A military adventurer who made his fortune and name in India with the Marathas. |
| (Netherlands) Jacob Van Braam | 1729–1792 | 1741–1779 | United Kingdom | A Dutch sword master and mercenary in British service. An officer under Lawrence Washington, he is also credited with training his younger half-brother George Washington. |
| (United Kingdom) George Hanger, 4th Baron Coleraine | 1751–1824 | 1776–1780 | Hesse-Kassel | A British author and eccentric who served in the Hessian Jägers during the American Revolutionary War. |
| (France) Claude Auguste Court | 1793–1880 | 1827–1843 | Punjab | French soldier and mercenary in the service of Ranjit Singh. Attaining the rank of general, Court was considered one of the leading European officers in the Punjab Army. |
| (France) Pierre Cuillier-Perron | 1755–1834 | 1780–1803 | | Military adventurer in India who served under Benoît de Boigne. He succeeded De Boigne as commander-in-chief of Sindhia's army until the defeat of Ujjain in 1801. He defected to Great Britain during the Second Anglo-Maratha War after his forces were destroyed by Lord Lake and Sir Arthur Wellesley. |
| (United Kingdom) Sidney Smith | 1764–1840 | 1790 | Sweden | British naval officer who served in the Royal Swedish Navy in the war between Sweden and Russia. |
| (United Kingdom) John Robison | 1778–1843 | 1802–1815 | | Scottish inventor in the service of Nizam of Hyderabad. |
| (United Kingdom) Thomas Sutcliffe | 1790–1849 | 1817–1838 | Chile; Colombia | English soldier of fortune who served as an army officer in the service of Colombia and Chile. |
| (United Kingdom) John Holmes | | 1829–1848 | Sikh Empire | Anglo-Indian mercenary in the service of the Sikh Empire. He served with the Sikh Khalsa Army during the First Anglo-Sikh War. |
| (Naples) Paolo Avitabile | 1791–1850 | 1815–1824; 1827–1843 | Persia; Punjab | Neapolitan adventurer who served under Fath-Ali Shah Qajar, Ranjit Singh and Sher Singh in the years following the Napoleonic Wars. |
| (Italy) Giuseppe Garibaldi | 1807–1882 | 1833–1854 | Brazil; Uruguay | One of the founders of modern Italy who led the Redshirts during the Risorgimento. As a youth, he served in military enterprises in Brazil, Uruguay and Europe. |
| (Republic of Ireland) James Patrick Mahon | 1800–1891 | 1852–1858; 1861–1877 | | Irish journalist and mercenary who fought in Europe, South America and United States during the mid-to late 19th century. |
| (Republic of Ireland) George Dawson Flinter | d. 1838 | 1816–1838 | Spain | Irish adventurer and mercenary who left the British Army to become a staff officer in Spanish service and took part in the First Carlist War. |
| (United Kingdom) John de Havilland | 1826–1886 | | Spain | English soldier of fortune who served in Spain under Don Carlos where he became a general in the Spanish Army. An officer of arms at the College of Arms, Havilland is one of two people born in the U.S. to have held that rank. |
| (United Kingdom) Stephen Bartlett Lakeman | 1823–1900 | 1853–1856 | Ottoman Empire | English adventurer and mercenary soldier who rose to become a general in the Ottoman Empire. |
| (Italy) Camillo Ricchiardi | 1865–1940 | 1899–1902 | Transvaal | Italian adventurer and journalist who commanded the Italian Volunteer Legion during the Second Boer War. |
| (France) Prosper Giquel | 1835–1886 | 1861–1885 | China | French naval officer who took part in the Taiping rebellion. His time with the Qing government played an important role in the modernization of 19th century China. |
| (United Kingdom) Harry Aubrey de Vere Maclean | 1848–1920 | 1877–1908 | Morocco | Scottish soldier who served Sultan Mawlay Hassan and Mawlay Abdelaziz as a military instructor to the Moroccan Army. |
| (United States) Frederick Townsend Ward | 1831–1862 | 1852–1862 | China | American sailor and soldier of fortune known for his military service in Imperial China during the Taiping Rebellion. He was killed while leading Qing forces at the Battle of Cixi. |
| (United States) Ira Allen | 1751–1814 | | France | One of the founders of Vermont, Allen co-led the Green Mountain Boys during the American Revolutionary War. He went to France in 1795 seeking French army intervention for seizing Canada, to create an independent republic called United Columbia. He bought 20,000 muskets and 24 cannon, but was captured at sea, taken to England, placed on trial, charged with furnishing arms for Irish rebels. |
| (United States) Horace Bell | 1830–1918 | 1859–1861 | Nicaragua; Mexico | A founding member of the Los Angeles Rangers, Bell was a member of William Walker's filibustering expedition in Nicaragua and Benito Juárez's Army in Mexico during the Reform War. |
| (United States) Parker H. French | 1826–1880 | 1855–1856 | Nicaragua | Adventurer and swindler who participated in William Walker's conquest of Nicaragua. |
| (United States) James Long | 1793–1822 | 1819–1822 | | A former US Army surgeon, Long was involved in two filibustering expeditions against the Spanish Empire. He led the ill-fated led Long Expedition to establish an independent republic in Spanish Texas. |
| (United States) Augustus Magee | 1789–1813 | 1812–1813 | | A former US Army officer who led a filibustering expedition of Spanish Texas in 1812. |
| (United States) Philo Norton McGiffin | 1860-1897 | 1885-1895 | | An 1884 graduate of the United States Naval Academy, McGiffin, due to Congressional budget cuts did not receive a billet (a job opening) in the U.S. Navy and went to China looking for naval employment. Just in time for the Sino-Japanese War in 1894, McGiffin, promoted to the rank of captain in the Imperial Chinese Navy, was the executive officer and later commander of the Chinese ironclad Chen Yuen (aka Zhen Yuan) during the Battle of the Yalu River (1894), where he was seriously wounded. McGiffin ultimately died as a result of his wounds in 1897. |
| (United States) George Mathews | 1739–1812 | 1810–1812 | | A Continental Army officer during the American Revolutionary War, Mathews was a key figure in an 1810–1812 filibuster expedition to capture Spanish Florida for the United States. |
| (United States) John A. Quitman | 1798–1858 | 1849–1854 | | As military governor of Mexico City, Quitman aided Venezuelan filibuster Narciso López's expedition to liberate Cuba from Spanish rule in 1850. He and Mansfield Lovell later attempted a filibustering expedition to Cuba in 1853, however, the plans were abandoned when President Franklin Pierce withdrew his support. |
| (United States) William Walker | 1824–1860 | 1853–1860 | Nicaragua | Lawyer and journalist who led several filibustering expeditions into Latin America during the 1850s. He served as president of Nicaragua from 1856 to 1857 when he was defeated by a coalition of Central American armies. |
| (United States) Chatham Roberdeau Wheat | 1826–1862 | 1849–1861 | Mexico | An American mercenary and filibusterer who took fought under Narciso López in Cuba and Juan Álvarez in Mexico. He was briefly a member of Giuseppe Garibaldi's Expedition of the Thousand but returned to the U.S. at the start of the American Civil War. |

== Industrial ==
| Name | Life | Years active | Allegiance (Organization) | Comments |
|---|---|---|---|---|
| Frederick Russell Burnham | 1861–1947 | 1893–1897 1900–1901 | United Kingdom; British South Africa Company | American scout and adventurer who served with the British South Africa Company and the British Army in colonial Africa. |
| Lee Christmas | 1863–1924 | 1897–1923 | Honduras | American engineer who fought with rebel groups in Central America during the early 20th century. Initially employed as a railroad engineer in Honduras, he was kidnapped by rebels in 1897. Christmas eventually joined their cause and became a close associate of General Manuel Bonilla. |
| (United Kingdom) Morris Cohen | 1887–1970 | 1922–1943 | Tongmenghui; China | Polish-born British adventurer who became aide-de-camp to Dr. Sun Yat-sen and a major-general in the Chinese National Revolutionary Army. |
| George Washington Dixon | 1801–1861 | 1847 | | American singer and stage actor best known as one of the earliest blackface performers. A controversial newspaper editor, Dixon took part in a failed filibustering expedition to the Yucatán in 1847. |
| Josiah Harlan | 1799–1871 | 1824–1839 | Sikh Empire; Emirate of Afghanistan; United Kingdom | American adventurer who traveled to Afghanistan and Punjab with the intention of making himself a king. Rudyard Kipling's short story The Man Who Would Be King is partly based on his life. |
| (United Kingdom) Charles Frederick Henningsen | 1815–1877 | 1834–1863 | Carlists; Circassia; Hungarian State (1849); Nicaragua; CSA | An English mercenary and munitions expert who fought in the First Carlist War, Russian-Circassian War, Hungarian Revolution of 1848, and the U.S. Civil War. Henningsen was involved in several filibustering expeditions during the 1850s including, most notably, William Walker's campaign in Nicaragua. |
| (Russia) Emilio Kosterlitzky | 1853–1928 | 1871–1913 | Mexico | Russian-born soldier of fortune, known as the "Mexican Cossack", who participated in the Mexican Apache Wars and Yaqui Wars. Imprisoned during the Mexican Revolution, Kosterlitzky was freed after the intervention of the U.S. in 1914. |
| Homer Lea | 1876–1912 | 1899–1912 | Tongmenghui | American adventurer involved with Chinese reform and revolutionary movements in the early twentieth century. A close associate of Dr. Sun Yat-sen during the 1911 Chinese Republican revolution. |
| Henry McIver | 1841–1907 | 1857–1884 | United Kingdom; Kingdom of Italy; Carlists; Second Mexican Empire; Principality of Serbia; British East India Company | American soldier of fortune who fought for 18 countries during his 27-year career. |
| (United States) Robert Hale Merriman | 1908-1938 | 1937-1938 | Spanish Republic; International Brigades | American doctoral student who fought with the Republican forces in Spain during the Spanish Civil War. He was killed while commanding the Abraham Lincoln Battalion of the International Brigades. |
| (United States) Thaddeus P. Mott | 1831–1894 | 1848–1857; 1868–1879 | Kingdom of Italy; Mexico; Ottoman Empire; Khedivate of Egypt | American adventurer and ex-soldier who fought in Mexico, Italy, and Turkey. As an advisor to Sultan Abdulaziz, Mott recruited former Union and Confederate soldiers for service in the Egyptian Army. |
| (United Kingdom) Carol Ap Rhys Pryce | 1876–1955 | 1911 | Mexico | Indian-Born Welsh soldier of fortune. Noted for his role in the 1911 Magonista rebellion in Baja California as an officer with the Mexican Foreign Legion. |
| (Kingdom of Prussia) Prince Felix von Salm-Salm | 1820–1870 | 1846–1870 | Austrian Empire; United States; Second Mexican Empire | Prussian cavalry officer in the First Schleswig War that went on to serve the Austrian Empire in the Austro-Sardinian War, the American Union Army, the Second Mexican Empire, and lastly for Prussia in the Franco-Prussian War. |
| Rafael de Nogales Méndez | 1879–1937 | 1898–1933 | Ottoman Empire; Spain; Mexico; Nicaragua | Venezuelan adventurer and writer who took part in the Russo-Japanese War, Spanish–American War and various uprisings in Latin America. Méndez served with the Ottoman Empire during World War I where he was a witness to the Armenian genocide. |
| Abdul Injai | | 1905–1915 | Kingdom of Portugal; Portugal | Muslim Wolof mercenary in colonial Portuguese Guinea at the turn of the 20th century. |
| (United States) Frederic Ives Lord | 1897–1967 | 1917–1919; 1936–1945 | Mexico; United Kingdom; White Army; Spanish Republic | Royal Flying Corps flying ace during the First World War and Russian Civil War. He was also served as a military advisor to the Mexican air force during the Mexican Revolution. |
| (Sweden) Carl Gustaf von Rosen | 1909–1977 | 1936–1977 | Ethiopian Empire; Finland; Biafra; Derg | A volunteer pilot for Finland during the Winter War and Biafra during the Biafran War. A pioneer aviator, Rosen flew relief missions in a number of conflicts from the 1930s to 1970s. |
| (United Kingdom) Francis Arthur Sutton | 1884–1944 | 1918?–1928 | Manchuria | English adventurer, known as "One Arm Sutton", who served as a major general for Manchurian warlord Zhang Zuolin. |
| (Sweden) Ivor Thord-Gray | 1878–1964 | 1893–1919 | United Kingdom; Cape Colony; Kenya Colony; United States; Philippines; Republic of China (1912-1949); Mexico; White Army | Swedish adventurer who participated in 13 different wars across several continents. |
| (United States) Frank Glasgow Tinker | 1909–1939 | 1936–1937 | Spanish Republic | Volunteer fighter pilot and top American ace for the Spanish Republican Air Force during the Spanish Civil War. |
| (Kingdom of Italy) Amleto Vespa | 1888–1944 | 1922–1941 | Manchuria; Empire of Japan | Fascist mercenary, spy and weapons smuggler who worked for Manchurian warlord Zhang Zuolin and later for the Empire of Japan. |
| (Switzerland) (Poland) Jan Zumbach | 1915–1986 | 1940–1967 | France; UK; Katanga; Biafra | A Swiss-born Polish fighter pilot who served with the British, French and Polish Air Force during World War II. He also took part in the Congo Crisis and Nigerian Civil War as an air force commander during the 1960s. |

== Modern ==
| Name | Life | Years active | Allegiance (Organization) | Comments |
|---|---|---|---|---|
| (Germany) Roland Bartetzko | 1970– | 1987-1992 (military service) 1992-1999 (for Bosnia and Kosovo) | Germany; Herzeg-Bosnia, Kosovo Liberation Army | Convicted of terrorism in 2002 for a car bombing that killed one and wounded four others. Sentenced to 23 years imprisonment, later reduced to 20 years. Released in 2015. |
| (Japan) Masaki Takabe | 1960– | 1986-1995 | Afghan mujahideen Croatian Defence Council Karen National Liberation Army | Fought in the Soviet–Afghan War, Myanmar conflict and Bosnian War. |
| (South Korea) Ken Rhee | 1984– | 2007-2014 (military service) 2022 (for Ukraine) | Republic of Korea Navy International Legion (Ukraine) | A former Republic of Korea Navy Special Warfare Flotilla operator, Rhee served with International Legion Ukraine during Russian invasion of Ukraine. He also have own consultant security company and YouTube channel named ROKSEAL |
| (France) Roger Faulques | 1924– 2011 | 1944–1970 | French Forces of the Interior France State of Katanga Mutawakkilite Kingdom of Yemen Biafra | He fought in World War II, the First Indochina War, the Suez Crisis, the Algerian War, the Congo Crisis, the North Yemen Civil War and the Nigerian Civil War. He is one of France's most decorated soldiers. |
| (United States) Joseph Adams | | 1970s– 1980s | Nicaragua; Contras | Bodyguard and military adviser of Adolfo Calero, one of the leaders of the Contra rebellion in Nicaragua. |
| (United States) George Bacon | 1946–1976 | 1975–1976 | Angola; FNLA | A former Green Beret and CIA operative, Bacon served with the National Liberation Front of Angola during the Angolan Civil War. |
| (United States) Hilaire du Berrier | 1906–2002 | | Ethiopian Empire; Spanish Republic; Republic of China; France | Pilot and spy who fought with the Ethiopian Air Force in the Second Italo-Ethiopian War, joined the Republican Air Force in the Spanish Civil War as a nationalist spy, and later operated a spy network for the Chinese, in cooperation with France, against the Japanese in the Second Sino-Japanese War |
| (United States) Frank Camper | 1946– | | El Salvador; Guatemala; Mexico; Yemen | A Vietnam War veteran and Defense Intelligence Agency employee who operated as a freelance mercenary in El Salvador, Guatemala, Mexico and Yemen. He later operated the Recondo mercenary training school near Dolomite, Alabama. According to the FBI, Camper was personally responsible for saving the Indian Prime Minister Rajiv Gandhi's life in 1985. |
| (United States) Claire Lee Chennault | 1893–1958 | 1941–1958 | Republic of China; Burma; Thailand; French Union; State of Vietnam; Cambodia; Laos | Founder and Commander of American Volunteer Group (Flying Tigers). Founder of Civil Air Transport (Later known as Air America). Post Commander of American Legion China Post 1 Shanghai. |
| (United States) Thomas W. Chittum | 1947– | early 1970s–1992 | Croatia; Rhodesia | A Vietnam War veteran who fought in the Rhodesian War and Croatian War of Independence. |
| / (United Kingdom) Charlie Christodoulou | 1951–1976 | 1975–1976 | Angola; FNLA | Greek Cypriot-born British mercenary killed in an ambush in Angola during the Angolan War of Independence. |
| (United States) John Alan Coey | 1950–1975 | 1972–1975 | Rhodesia | A former United States Marine Corps Officer Candidate who left to join the Rhodesian Light Infantry. He was killed in action in 1975 and was the first American to die in the Rhodesian Bush War. |
| (United States) Andrew J. Moonen | 1980– | 2006–2007 | Iraq | Former employee of Blackwater Security, accused by the Iraq government of murdering Raheem Khalif, a security guard of the Iraqi Vice-president, Adel Abdul Mahdi. |
| (Belgian Congo) / (Belgium) Yves Debay | 1954–2013 | late 1970s–1986 | Rhodesia; South Africa | Congolese-born Belgian mercenary who served in the Rhodesian Bush War and South African Border War. He became war correspondent in 1986 and covered wars in Afghanistan, both Iraq wars, Lebanon, the Balkans, Libya and Syria. Debay was the first Belgian journalist killed during the Syrian civil war. |
| (United Kingdom) Peter Kemp | 1913–1993 | 1936–1946 | Nationalist; United Kingdom | British SOE Agent who worked with WW2 resistance fighters in Albania, Poland and Indochina. Also fought in the Spanish Civil War on the side of the Nationalist. |
| (Poland) Rafał Gan-Ganowicz | 1932–2002 | 1950–1969 | United States; Congo-Léopoldville; Mutawakkilite Kingdom of Yemen | Polish Anti-Communist Mercenary who was a member of the Polish government-in-exile and fought in the Congo Crisis and the North Yemen Civil War. |
| (Canada) (United States) Jordan Goudreau | 1976– | 2018– 2020 | United States (alleged) | Former US Special Forces Sergeant. Founder of Silvercorp USA. Organized the failed Macuto Bay Incursion into Venezuela. |
| (Hungary) (Israel) (France) Abraham Golan | | 2015 | Yemen United Arab Emirates | Founder of Spear Operations Group. Led former US Special Operators and French Legionnaires on combat raids and assassinations in Yemen. |
| (United States) Jonathan "Jack" Idema | 1956–2012 | 1984–2004 | Honduras El Salvador Lithuania United States (alleged) Northern Alliance (alleged) (Transitional Islamic State of Afghanistan) TISA (alleged) | Former US Special Forces Sergeant. Alleged Advisor to Afghan Northern Alliance. Commander of Task Force Saber 7. Alleged freelance interrogator. Convicted by Afghan Government of kidnapping, running a private prison and torture. |
| (Brazil) Pedro Marangoni | 1949 | 1968– 1980 | Brazil; France; Mozambique; Rhodesia; Spain | |
| (Belgium) Jean Schramme | 1929–1988 | 1961–1968 | Katanga; Congo-Léopoldville | Belgian planter who turned mercenary during the Congo Crisis and led the 1967 uprising in Katanga against Colonel Mobutu Sese Seko. |
| (United States) Tex O'Reilly | 1880–1946 | 1900s–1920s | Mexico; División del Norte; Spain | An American adventurer and soldier of fortune who participated in the Banana Wars, Mexican Revolution and the Rif War during the early 20th century. |
| (United States) Robert C. MacKenzie | 1948–1995 | 1970–1985 | Rhodesia; South Africa; Transkei; Sierra Leone | An ex-Vietnam War veteran who served as an officer with the Rhodesian Special Air Service, South African Defence Force, and Transkei Defense Force. He was later a contributing editor for Soldier of Fortune and covered conflicts around the globe. |
| (United States) Dean Ivan Lamb | 1886–1956 | 1912–1923 | Honduras; Mexico; Paraguay | A mercenary fighter pilot who took part in the Mexican Revolution, World War I and the Second Paraguayan Civil War. He also helped to establish the Honduran Air Force in 1921. |
| (Palestine) Abu Nidal | 1937–2002 | 1967–2002 | Rejectionist Front | Founder of the Abu Nidal Organization. |
| (Venezuela) Ilich Ramírez Sánchez (Carlos the Jackal) | 1949– | 1970–1994 | PFLP-terrorists; Stasi; Ba'athist Iraq | Venezuelan Communist known for committing several terrorist attacks in Europe and the Middle East, most notably the OPEC siege in 1975. |
| (United States) Bruce Conde | 1913–1992 | 1962–1970 | Mutawakkilite Kingdom of Yemen | Stamp collector and royal impostor who served as a general with Royalist forces in the North Yemen Civil War. |
| (United States) Harold Edward Dahl | 1909–1956 | 1936–1945 | Spanish Republic; Canada | Mercenary pilot who was a member of Andrés García La Calle's "American Patrol" group during the Spanish Civil War. |
| (Ukraine) / (United States) Sam Dreben | 1878–1925 | 1907–1917 | Mexico; Guatemala; Honduras; Nicaragua | A World War I war hero popularly known as "The Fighting Jew". He also fought as a mercenary during the Banana Wars and Mexican Revolution. |
| (United States) Sam Hall | 1937–2014 | 1980s | Nicaragua; Contras | One time U.S. Olympian who fought on the side of anti-communist forces as a military advisor to the Nicaraguan Contras. |
| (Scotland) Peter McAleese | 1942–2024 | 1976-early 1990s | Angola; FNLA; Rhodesia; South Africa; Colombia | An ex-British Army N.C.O who served with elite units such as the Parachute Regiment and Special Air Service, the Rhodesian Special Air Service and the Selous Scouts branch of the British South Africa Police, and South Africa's 44 Parachute Brigade and 32 Battalion. As a mercenary he fought alongside the FNLA and attempted to assassinate Pablo Escobar on behalf of the Cali Cartel. |
| (France) Bob Denard | 1929–2007 | 1961–1995 | Katanga; Mutawakkilite Kingdom of Yemen; Congo-Léopoldville; Rhodesia; Biafra; Gabon; People's Republic of Benin; Comoros | French soldier and mercenary who operated in many African countries during the Cold War. He is, to date, the only mercenary who has ruled over a nation. However, he did not hold political office and ruled through the puppet president he ousted previously, Ahmed Abdallah. |
| (France) Dominique Borella | 1927–1975 | 1945–1975 | Khmer Republic; Lebanon | French soldier and mercenary who fought in the Algerian War, Cambodian Civil War and the Lebanese Civil War. |
| (Germany) Rolf Steiner | 1933– | 1950–1971 | France; OAS; Biafra; Anyanya | Soldier of fortune who led the 4th Commando Brigade in the Biafran Army during the Nigerian Civil War, and later served with the Anyanya rebels in southern Sudan. |
| // (Republic of Ireland) Mike Hoare | 1919–2020 | 1960–1983 | Katanga; Congo-Léopoldville; Seychelles | An Indian-born Irish mercenary leader known for military activities in Africa and his attempt to conduct a coup d'état in the Seychelles. |
| (Germany) /Siegfried Müller | 1920–1983 | 1962–1965 | Congo-Léopoldville | A former Wehrmacht officer-candidate who fought as a mercenary under Major Mike Hoare in the Congo Crisis. |
| (Canada) Lynn Garrison | 1937– | 1967–1970 | Biafra | Flew as a combat pilot in various conflicts, most notably the Nigerian Civil War, and later acted as a military and political advisor, allegedly with the support of a number of US Government agencies and various U.S. senators. |
| (Fiji) / (United Kingdom) Fred Marafano | 1940–2013 | 1984–2006 | Sierra Leone; Executive Outcomes | Fijian-born British Special Air Service operative turned mercenary who fought in the Sierra Leone civil war as a member of Executive Outcomes. |
| / (United Kingdom) Costas Georgiou | 1951–1976 | 1975–1976 | Angola; FNLA | Greek Cypriot-born British mercenary executed in Angola following the Luanda Trial for activities during the civil war phase of the Angolan War of Independence. |
| (United Kingdom) Philip Sessarego | 1952–2008 | 1979–1993 | Sri Lanka; Mujahideen; Afghanistan; Croatia | Failed SAS Selection candidate who became a soldier of fortune and claimed to have trained Mujahideen in Afghanistan before faking his own death in 1993. |
| (United Kingdom) Simon Mann | 1952–2025 | 1993–2004 | Executive Outcomes; Angola; Sierra Leone; Papua New Guinea; Equatorial Guinea | Former British Army officer who was imprisoned in Equatorial Guinea for his role in a failed coup d'état in 2004. |
| (United Kingdom) Tim Spicer | 1952– | 1994– | Sandline International; Aegis Defense Services; Papua New Guinea; Sierra Leone; Iraq | A British Army officer turned military contractor. He served as CEO of Sandline International from 1995 to 2000 before co-founding Aegis Defence Services. |
| (Bolivia) / (Hungary) Eduardo Rózsa-Flores | 1960–2009 | 1991–1994 | Croatia | A war correspondent for La Vanguardia and the Spanish unit of the BBC World Service, Rózsa-Flores joined the Croatian National Guard during the Croatian War of Independence. As the group's first foreign volunteer, he helped form the Croatian army's First International Unit. Rózsa-Flores was later killed in a police raid during a meeting to allegedly plan the assassination of Bolivian president Evo Morales. |
| (Israel) Yair Klein | 1943– | | Lebanon; Colombia; Medellín Cartel; Revolutionary United Front | A former Israeli Army officer who founded the private mercenary company Spearhead Ltd. The organization provided arms and training to armed forces in South America, Lebanon, and Sierra Leone. |
| (South Africa) Nick du Toit | | | Equatorial Guinea | South African arms dealer and mercenary implicated in the 2004 plot to overthrow Teodoro Obiang of Equatorial Guinea. |
| (Italy) Tullio Moneta | 1937–2022 | 1964–1981 | South Africa; Seychelles | Italian-born South African mercenary who served under Mike Hoare in the Congo. He was second-in-command to Hoare during the failed 1981 coup at Mahe Airport in the Seychelles. Moneta was sentenced to five years in prison. |
| (South Africa) Neall Ellis | 1949– | Late 1960s–1971 1996–2004 | Rhodesia; Executive Outcomes; Sandline International; Sierra Leone | An ex-South African Air Force pilot, Ellis later contracted for various private military corporations including Executive Outcomes and Sandline International. During the civil war in Sierra Leone, he and his crew held off Revolutionary United Front forces almost single-handedly before the capital was overrun. |
| (United Kingdom) / Taffy Williams | 1933–1996 | 1960–1970 | Katanga; Biafra | Welsh-born mercenary who served in Biafra and the Congo with Mike Hoare and 5 Commando (Congo). |
| (New Zealand) Kelvyn Alp | 1971– | 1996–2002 | Māori | Founder of the New Zealand Armed Intervention Force. Though founded as a mercenary organisation, it was referred to in the media as a Māori separatist group. |
| (Liberia) / (Sweden) Jackie Arklöv | 1973– | 1992–1999 | Croatia | Liberian-born Swedish mercenary who took part in Yugoslav Wars. He was imprisoned for war crimes in Bosnia but eventually returned to Sweden in a prisoner exchange. Arklöv later joined the neo-Nazi group led by Tony Olsson and participated in their 1999 crime spree that led to the deaths of two police officers. |
| (United States) Mitchell WerBell III | 1918–1983 | 1950–1973 | Cuba; Dominican Republic | An ex-Office of Strategic Services guerrilla operative, arms dealer and weapons designer who served as a security advisor to Dominican dictator Rafael Trujillo and to the Batista regime in Cuba during the 1950s. Also involved with various rebel groups in the Caribbean and Central America during the Cold War. |
| (Indonesia) Satria Arta Kumbara | late 1980s | 2025 | Indonesia Russia | An Indonesian Marine Corps deserter in 2022, he was a mercenary for Russian Ground Forces in Russian invasion of Ukraine in 2025. However he went back to his country after Indonesian government revoked his citizenship. |
| (Indonesia) Ebas alkafaroh (Azzamat) | 16 June 1998 | late 2025-2026 | Russia | He was a member of Wagner Group likely to join in late 2025 and still active on the ukrainian frontline, he is listed as a fugitive and a terrorist on Ukraine's wanted list. He is active in Tiktok with an account named @ebas_azzamat. |
