= February 14 =

February 14 this year in various calendars
- Saturday, 14 February 2026
Other calendars
Armenian	29 Mehekani 1475
Aztec	Etzalcualiztli 15, 10 Calli
Babylonian	25 Tebetu, 2336 SE
Balinese pawukon	Menga, Beteng, Jaya, Paing, Was, Saniscara of Menail, Kala, Ogan, Dewa
Bengali	7 Bhadro, BS 1433
Chinese	Yin Earth Goat・Girl Mansion; 205 Liùyuè, Yǐsìnián (Lichun, 4 days until Yushui)
Common Era	14 February 2026 CE
Coptic	7 Meshir, AM 1742
Egyptian	4 Epiphi, 2774 NE
Ethiopian	7 Yakātit, 2018 Amätä Məhrät
French Republican	Décade III, Sextidi de Pluviôse de l'Année 234 de la République
Gregorian	14 February, AD 2026
Hebrew	27 Shevat, AM 5786
Icelandic	Laugardagur, 23 Þorri 2025
Islamic	26 Sha'aban, AH 1447 (using tabular method)
ISO week date	2026-W07-6
Japanese	27 Shiwasu, Reiwa 8 (Risshun, 5 days until Usui)
Julian	1 February, AD 2026 (AM 7534)
Julian day	2461086
Maya	13.0.13.6.3; 1 Kayab, 10 Akbal
Roman	Kalendis Februariis, MMDCCLXXIX AUC
Solar Hijri	25 Bahman, SH 1404

<<	February					>>
Su	Mo	Tu	We	Th	Fr	Sa
1	2	3	4	5	6	7
8	9	10	11	12	13	14
15	16	17	18	19	20	21
22	23	24	25	26	27	28
2026

February 14 in recent years
2026 (Saturday)
2025 (Friday)
2024 (Wednesday)
2023 (Tuesday)
2022 (Monday)
2021 (Sunday)
2020 (Friday)
2019 (Thursday)
2018 (Wednesday)
2017 (Tuesday)

February 14 is the 45th day of the year in the Gregorian calendar; 320 days remain until the end of the year (321 in leap years).

This day is observed in most countries as Valentine's Day.

== Events ==
=== Pre-1600 ===
- 748 – Abbasid Revolution: The Hashimi rebels under Abu Muslim Khorasani take Merv, capital of the Umayyad province Khorasan, marking the consolidation of the Abbasid revolt.
- 763 – The death of Ibrahim ibn Abdallah marks the end of the Alid revolt of 762–763.
- 842 – Charles the Bald and Louis the German swear the Oaths of Strasbourg in the French and German languages.
- 1014 – Pope Benedict VIII crowns Henry of Bavaria, King of Germany and of Italy, as Holy Roman Emperor.
- 1130 – The troubled 1130 papal election exposes a rift within the College of Cardinals.
- 1349 – Strasbourg massacre: Several thousand Jews are burned to death by mobs while the remaining Jews are forcibly removed from Strasbourg after being accused of causing the Black Death.
- 1530 – Spanish conquistadores, led by Nuño de Guzmán, overthrow and execute Tangaxuan II, the last independent monarch of the Tarascan state in present-day central Mexico.
- 1556 – Having been declared a heretic and laicized by Pope Paul IV on 4 December 1555, Archbishop of Canterbury Thomas Cranmer is publicly defrocked at Christ Church Cathedral.
- 1556 – Coronation of Akbar as ruler of the Mughal Empire.

=== 1601–1900 ===
- 1613 – Wedding of Princess Elizabeth and Frederick V of the Palatinate at Whitehall Palace, London.
- 1655 – The Mapuches launch coordinated attacks against the Spanish in Chile beginning the Mapuche uprising of 1655.
- 1778 – The United States flag is formally recognized by a foreign naval vessel for the first time, when French Admiral Toussaint-Guillaume Picquet de la Motte renders a nine gun salute to USS Ranger, commanded by John Paul Jones.
- 1779 – American Revolutionary War: The Battle of Kettle Creek is fought in Georgia.
- 1779 – James Cook is killed by Native Hawaiians near Kealakekua on the Island of Hawaii.
- 1797 – French Revolutionary Wars: Battle of Cape St. Vincent: John Jervis, (later 1st Earl of St Vincent) and Horatio Nelson (later 1st Viscount Nelson) lead the British Royal Navy to victory over a Spanish fleet in action near Gibraltar.
- 1804 – Karađorđe leads the First Serbian Uprising against the Ottoman Empire.
- 1831 – Ras Marye of Yejju marches into Tigray and defeats and kills Dejazmach Sabagadis in the Battle of Debre Abbay.
- 1835 – The original Quorum of the Twelve Apostles, in the Latter Day Saint movement, is formed in Kirtland, Ohio.
- 1849 – In New York City, James Knox Polk becomes the first serving President of the United States to have his photograph taken.
- 1852 – Great Ormond St Hospital for Sick Children, the first hospital in England to provide in-patient beds specifically for children, is founded in London.
- 1855 – Texas is linked by telegraph to the rest of the United States, with the completion of a connection between New Orleans and Marshall, Texas.
- 1859 – Oregon is admitted as the 33rd U.S. state.
- 1876 – Alexander Graham Bell applies for a patent for the telephone, as does Elisha Gray.
- 1879 – The War of the Pacific breaks out when the Chilean Army occupies the Bolivian port city of Antofagasta.
- 1899 – Voting machines are approved by the U.S. Congress for use in federal elections.
- 1900 – The British Army begins the Battle of the Tugela Heights in an effort to lift the Siege of Ladysmith.

=== 1901–present ===
- 1903 – The United States Department of Commerce and Labor is established (later split into the Department of Commerce and the Department of Labor).
- 1912 – Arizona is admitted as the 48th and the last contiguous U.S. state.
- 1912 – The U.S. Navy commissions its first class of diesel-powered submarines.
- 1918 – Soviet Russia adopts the Gregorian calendar.
- 1919 – The Polish–Soviet War begins.
- 1920 – The League of Women Voters is founded in Chicago.
- 1924 – The Computing-Tabulating-Recording Company changes its name to International Business Machines Corporation (IBM).
- 1929 – Saint Valentine's Day Massacre: Seven people, six of them gangster rivals of Al Capone's gang, are murdered in Chicago.
- 1939 – World War II: German battleship Bismarck is launched.
- 1942 – World War II: Battle of Pasir Panjang contributes to the fall of Singapore.
- 1943 – World War II: Rostov-on-Don, Russia is liberated.
- 1943 – World War II: Tunisia Campaign: General Hans-Jürgen von Arnim's Fifth Panzer Army launches a counter-attack against Allied positions in Tunisia.
- 1944 – World War II: In the action of 14 February 1944, a Royal Navy submarine sinks a German-controlled Italian Regia Marina submarine in the Strait of Malacca.
- 1945 – World War II: On the first day of the bombing of Dresden, the British Royal Air Force and the United States Army Air Forces begin fire-bombing Dresden.
- 1945 – World War II: Navigational error leads to the mistaken bombing of Prague, Czechoslovakia by a United States Army Air Forces squadron of B-17s assisting in the Soviet Red Army's Vistula–Oder Offensive.
- 1945 – World War II: Mostar is liberated by Yugoslav partisans
- 1945 – President Franklin D. Roosevelt meets King Ibn Saud of Saudi Arabia aboard the USS Quincy, officially beginning U.S.-Saudi diplomatic relations.
- 1946 – The Bank of England is nationalized.
- 1947 – The act abolishing all noble ranks and related styles comes into force in Hungary.
- 1949 – The Knesset (parliament of Israel) convenes for the first time.
- 1949 – The Asbestos Strike begins in Canada. The strike marks the beginning of the Quiet Revolution in Quebec.
- 1954 – First Indochina War - small French garrison at Đắk Đoa is overrun by the Viet Minh after a week's siege.
- 1961 – Discovery of the chemical elements: Element 103, Lawrencium, is first synthesized at the University of California.
- 1979 – In Kabul, Setami Milli militants kidnap the American ambassador to Afghanistan, Adolph Dubs who is later killed during a gunfight between his kidnappers and police.
- 1983 – United American Bank of Knoxville, Tennessee collapses. Its president, Jake Butcher, is later convicted of fraud.
- 1989 – Union Carbide agrees to pay $470 million to the Indian government for damages it caused in the 1984 Bhopal disaster.
- 1989 – Iranian leader Ruhollah Khomeini issues a fatwa encouraging Muslims to kill Salman Rushdie, author of The Satanic Verses.
- 1990 – Ninety-two people are killed when Indian Airlines Flight 605 crashes in Bangalore, India.
- 1990 – The Voyager 1 spacecraft takes the photograph of planet Earth that later becomes famous as Pale Blue Dot.
- 1998 – An oil tanker train collides with a freight train in Yaoundé, Cameroon, spilling fuel oil. One person scavenging the oil created a massive explosion which killed 120.
- 2000 – The spacecraft NEAR Shoemaker enters orbit around asteroid 433 Eros, the first spacecraft to orbit an asteroid.
- 2003 – Iraq disarmament crisis: UNMOVIC Executive Chairman Hans Blix reports to the United Nations Security Council that disarmament inspectors have found no weapons of mass destruction in Ba'athist Iraq.
- 2004 – In a suburb of Moscow, Russia, the roof of the Transvaal water park collapses, killing more than 28 people, and wounding 193 others.
- 2005 – In Beirut, 23 people, including former Prime Minister Rafic Hariri, are killed when the equivalent of around 1,000 kg of TNT is detonated while Hariri's motorcade drives through the city.
- 2005 – Seven people are killed and 151 wounded in a series of bombings by suspected al-Qaeda-linked militants that hit Makati, Davao City, and General Santos, all in the Philippines.
- 2005 – YouTube is launched by a group of college students, eventually becoming the largest video sharing website in the world and a main source for viral videos.
- 2008 – Northern Illinois University shooting: A gunman opens fire in a lecture hall of Northern Illinois University in DeKalb County, Illinois, resulting in six fatalities (including the gunman) and 21 injuries.
- 2011 – As a part of Arab Spring, the Bahraini uprising begins with a 'Day of Rage'.
- 2018 – Jacob Zuma resigns as President of South Africa.
- 2018 – A shooting at Marjory Stoneman Douglas High School in Parkland, Florida is one of the deadliest school massacres with 17 fatalities and 17 injuries.
- 2019 – Pulwama attack takes place in Lethpora in Pulwama district, Jammu and Kashmir, India in which 40 Central Reserve Police Force personnel and a suicide bomber were killed and 35 were injured.
- 2020 - At least 22 people are killed in an attack on a village in Northwest Region, Cameroon.

== Births ==
=== Pre-1600 ===
- 1404 – Leon Battista Alberti, Italian painter, poet, and philosopher (died 1472)
- 1408 – John FitzAlan, 14th Earl of Arundel (died 1435)
- 1452 – Pandolfo Petrucci, tyrant of Siena (died 1512)
- 1468 – Johannes Werner, German priest and mathematician (died 1522)
- 1483 – Babur, Mughal emperor (died 1530)
- 1490 – Valentin Friedland, German scholar and educationist of the Reformation (died 1556)
- 1513 – Domenico Ferrabosco, Italian composer (died 1573)
- 1545 – Lucrezia de' Medici, Duchess of Ferrara (died 1561)

=== 1601–1900 ===
- 1602 – Francesco Cavalli, Italian composer (died 1676)
- 1614 – John Wilkins, English bishop, academic and natural philosopher (died 1672)
- 1625 – Countess Palatine Maria Euphrosyne of Zweibrücken, Swedish princess (died 1687)
- 1628 – Valentine Greatrakes, Irish faith healer (died 1683)
- 1640 – Countess Palatine Anna Magdalena of Birkenfeld-Bischweiler (died 1693)
- 1670 – Rajaram Raj Bhonsle, third Chhatrapati of the Maratha Confederacy (died 1700)
- 1679 – Georg Friedrich Kauffmann, German organist and composer (died 1735)
- 1692 – Pierre-Claude Nivelle de La Chaussée, French author and playwright (died 1754)
- 1701 – Enrique Flórez, Spanish historian and author (died 1773)
- 1763 – Jean Victor Marie Moreau, French general (died 1813)
- 1782 – Eleanora Atherton, English philanthropist (died 1870)
- 1784 – Heinrich Baermann, German clarinetist (died 1847)
- 1799 – Walenty Wańkowicz, Polish painter and illustrator (died 1842)
- 1800 – Emory Washburn, American historian, lawyer, and politician, 22nd Governor of Massachusetts (died 1877)
- 1808 – Michael Costa, Italian-English conductor and composer (died 1884)
- 1812 – Fernando Wood, American merchant and politician, 73rd Mayor of New York City (died 1881)
- 1813 – Lydia Hamilton Smith, African-American businesswoman (died 1884)
- 1819 – Christopher Latham Sholes, American journalist and politician, invented the typewriter (died 1890)
- 1824 – Winfield Scott Hancock, American general and politician (died 1886)
- 1828 – Edmond François Valentin About, French journalist and author (died 1885)
- 1829 – Alfred Iverson Jr., American Confederate Army officer (died 1911)
- 1835 – Piet Paaltjens, Dutch minister and poet (died 1894)
- 1838 – Margaret E. Knight, American inventor (died 1914)
- 1846 – Julian Scott, American soldier and drummer, Medal of Honor recipient (died 1901)
- 1847 – Anna Howard Shaw, American physician, minister, and activist (died 1919)
- 1848 – Benjamin Baillaud, French astronomer and academic (died 1934)
- 1855 – Frank Harris, Irish author and journalist (died 1931)
- 1859 – George Washington Gale Ferris Jr., American engineer, inventor of the Ferris wheel (died 1896)
- 1860 – Eugen Schiffer, German lawyer and politician, Vice-Chancellor of Germany (died 1954)
- 1864 – Hadley Williams, Canadian surgeon and educator (died 1932)
- 1869 – Charles Thomson Rees Wilson, Scottish physicist and meteorologist, Nobel Prize laureate (died 1959)
- 1878 – Julius Nieuwland, Belgian priest, chemist and academic (died 1936)
- 1882 – John Barrymore, American actor (died 1942)
- 1884 – Nils Olaf Chrisander, Swedish actor and director (died 1947)
- 1884 – Kostas Varnalis, Greek poet and playwright (died 1974)
- 1888 – Chandrashekhar Agashe, Indian industrialist (died 1956)
- 1890 – Nina Hamnett, Welsh-English painter and author (died 1956)
- 1890 – Dick Richards, Welsh international footballer (died 1934)
- 1891 – Katherine Stinson, American aviator (died 1977)
- 1892 – Radola Gajda, Czech commander and politician (died 1948)
- 1894 – Jack Benny, American actor and producer (died 1974)
- 1895 – Wilhelm Burgdorf, German general (died 1945)
- 1895 – Max Horkheimer, German philosopher and sociologist (died 1973)
- 1898 – Bill Tilman, English mountaineer and explorer (died 1977)
- 1898 – Fritz Zwicky, Swiss-American physicist and astronomer (died 1974)
- 1900 – Jessica Dragonette, American singer (died 1980)

=== 1901–present ===
- 1902 – Thelma Ritter, American actress and singer (died 1969)
- 1903 – Stuart Erwin, American actor (died 1967)
- 1907 – Johnny Longden, English-American jockey and trainer (died 2003)
- 1911 – Willem Johan Kolff, Dutch physician and inventor (died 2009)
- 1912 – Tibor Sekelj, Hungarian lawyer, explorer, and author (died 1988)
- 1913 – Mel Allen, American sportscaster (died 1996)
- 1913 – Woody Hayes, American football player and coach (died 1987)
- 1913 – Jimmy Hoffa, American trade union leader (died 1975)
- 1913 – James Pike, American bishop (died 1969)
- 1915 – Sally Gray, English actress and singer (died 2006)
- 1916 – Marcel Bigeard, French general (died 2010)
- 1916 – Masaki Kobayashi, Japanese director and producer (died 1996)
- 1916 – Edward Platt, American actor (died 1974)
- 1917 – Herbert A. Hauptman, American mathematician and academic, Nobel Prize laureate (died 2011)
- 1921 – Hugh Downs, American journalist, game show host, and producer (died 2020)
- 1921 – Hazel McCallion, Canadian businesswoman and politician, 3rd Mayor of Mississauga (died 2023)
- 1923 – Jay Hebert, American golfer (died 1997)
- 1924 – Juan Ponce Enrile, Filipino politician and lawyer (died 2025)
- 1924 – Patricia Knatchbull, 2nd Countess Mountbatten of Burma (died 2017)
- 1927 – Lois Maxwell, Canadian-Australian model and actress (died 2007)
- 1928 – William Allain, American lawyer and politician, 58th Governor of Mississippi (died 2013)
- 1928 – Vicente T. Blaz, American general and politician (died 2014)
- 1929 – Vic Morrow, American actor and director (died 1982)
- 1931 – Brian Kelly, American actor and director (died 2005)
- 1932 – Harriet Andersson, Swedish actress
- 1932 – Alexander Kluge, German author, film director and public intellectual (died 2026)
- 1933 – Nell Hall Williams, American quilter (died 2021)
- 1934 – Florence Henderson, American actress and singer (died 2016)
- 1935 – David Wilson, Baron Wilson of Tillyorn, Scottish academic and diplomat, 27th Governor of Hong Kong
- 1936 – Anna German, Polish singer (died 1982)
- 1937 – John MacGregor, Baron MacGregor of Pulham Market, English politician, Secretary of State for Transport
- 1937 – Magic Sam, American singer and guitarist (died 1969)
- 1938 – Eberhard Riedel, German Olympic alpine skier (died 2026)
- 1939 – Razzy Bailey, American country music singer-songwriter and musician (died 2021)
- 1939 – Blowfly, American singer-songwriter and producer (died 2016)
- 1939 – Eugene Fama, American economist and academic, Nobel Prize laureate
- 1941 – Donna Shalala, American academic and politician, 18th United States Secretary of Health and Human Services
- 1941 – Paul Tsongas, American lawyer and politician (died 1997)
- 1942 – Michael Bloomberg, American businessman and politician, 108th Mayor of New York City
- 1942 – Andrew Robinson, American actor and director
- 1942 – Ricardo Rodríguez, Mexican racing driver (died 1962)
- 1943 – Maceo Parker, American saxophonist
- 1944 – Carl Bernstein, American journalist and author
- 1944 – Alan Parker, English director, producer, and screenwriter (died 2020)
- 1944 – Ronnie Peterson, Swedish racing driver (died 1978)
- 1945 – Hans-Adam II, Prince of Liechtenstein
- 1945 – Rod Masterson, American lieutenant and actor (died 2013)
- 1946 – Bernard Dowiyogo, Nauru politician, President of Nauru (died 2003)
- 1946 – Gregory Hines, American actor, singer, and dancer (died 2003)
- 1947 – Tim Buckley, American singer-songwriter and guitarist (died 1975)
- 1947 – Judd Gregg, American lawyer and politician, 76th Governor of New Hampshire
- 1947 – John Quayle, Australian rugby league player and administrator
- 1947 – Phạm Tuân, Vietnamese aviator and cosmonaut
- 1947 – Stephen A. Schwarzman, American businessman
- 1948 – Mayra Gómez Kemp, Cuban-Spanish television host and actress (died 2024)
- 1948 – Kitten Natividad, Mexican-American actress and dancer (died 2022)
- 1948 – Pat O'Brien, American journalist and author
- 1948 – Wally Tax, Dutch singer-songwriter (died 2005)
- 1948 – Teller, American magician and actor
- 1950 – Roger Fisher, American guitarist and songwriter
- 1951 – Terry Gross, American radio host and producer
- 1951 – Kevin Keegan, English footballer and manager (died 2026)
- 1952 – Sushma Swaraj, Indian lawyer and politician, Indian Minister of External Affairs (died 2019)
- 1954 – Jam Mohammad Yousaf, Pakistani politician, Chief Minister of Balochistan (died 2013)
- 1955 – Carol Kalish, American publisher (died 1991)
- 1956 – Howard Davis Jr., American boxer and trainer (died 2015)
- 1956 – Dave Dravecky, American baseball player
- 1956 – Katharina Fritsch, German sculptor and academic
- 1957 – Soile Isokoski, Finnish soprano and actress
- 1957 – Alan Smith, English bishop
- 1957 – Ken Wahl, American actor
- 1958 – Grant Thomas, Australian footballer and coach
- 1959 – Renée Fleming, American soprano and actress
- 1960 – Philip Jones, English admiral
- 1960 – Jim Kelly, American football player and businessman
- 1960 – Meg Tilly, American actress and author
- 1961 – D'Wayne Wiggins, American musical artist (died 2025)
- 1962 – Sakina Jaffrey, American actress
- 1963 – Enrico Colantoni, Canadian actor, director, and producer
- 1964 – Gianni Bugno, Italian cyclist and sportscaster
- 1964 – Zach Galligan, American actor
- 1966 – Petr Svoboda, Czech ice hockey player and agent
- 1967 – Stelios Haji-Ioannou, Greek-English businessman, founded easyJet
- 1967 – Calle Johansson, Swedish ice hockey player and coach
- 1967 – Manuela Maleeva, Bulgarian-Swiss tennis player
- 1967 – Bernie Moreno, American politician and businessman
- 1967 – Mark Rutte, Dutch businessman and politician, Prime Minister of the Netherlands
- 1968 – Jules Asner, American model and television host
- 1968 – Chris Lewis, Guyanese-English cricketer
- 1968 – Scott McClellan, American civil servant and author, 25th White House Press Secretary
- 1969 – Meg Hillier, English journalist and politician, Shadow Secretary of State for Energy and Climate Change
- 1970 – Giuseppe Guerini, Italian cyclist
- 1970 – Sean Hill, American ice hockey player
- 1970 – Simon Pegg, English actor, director, and producer
- 1970 – Takashi Saito, Japanese baseball player
- 1971 – Kris Aquino, Filipino talk show host, actress, and producer
- 1971 – Gheorghe Mureșan, Romanian basketball player
- 1972 – Drew Bledsoe, American football player and coach
- 1972 – Musōyama Masashi, Japanese sumo wrestler
- 1972 – Najwa Nimri, Spanish actress and singer
- 1972 – Jaan Tallinn, Estonian computer programmer, co-developed Skype
- 1972 – Rob Thomas, American singer-songwriter
- 1973 – H. D. Ackerman, South African cricketer
- 1973 – Annalisa Buffa, Italian mathematician
- 1973 – Tyus Edney, American basketball player and coach
- 1973 – Steve McNair, American football player (died 2009)
- 1974 – Valentina Vezzali, Italian fencer and politician
- 1975 – Viktor Kozlov, Russian ice hockey player and coach
- 1975 – Dámaso Marte, Dominican baseball player
- 1976 – Milan Hejduk, Czech-American ice hockey player
- 1976 – Liv Kristine, Norwegian singer-songwriter
- 1976 – Rie Rasmussen, Danish model, film director, writer, photographer, and actress
- 1977 – Anna Erschler, Russian mathematician
- 1977 – Cadel Evans, Australian cyclist
- 1977 – Jim Jefferies, Australian comedian and actor
- 1977 – Darren Purse, English footballer
- 1977 – Elmer Symons, South African motorcycle racer (died 2007)
- 1978 – Danai Gurira, American-Zimbabwean actress
- 1978 – Richard Hamilton, American basketball player
- 1978 – Darius Songaila, Lithuanian basketball player and coach
- 1980 – Josh Senter, American screenwriter and producer
- 1980 – Michelle Ye, Hong Kong actress and producer
- 1981 – Matteo Brighi, Italian footballer
- 1981 – Randy de Puniet, French motorcycle racer
- 1981 – Brad Halsey, American baseball player (died 2014)
- 1981 – Kara Lawson, American basketball player and coach
- 1981 – Jared Lorenzen, American football player (died 2019)
- 1982 – Marián Gáborík, Slovak ice hockey player
- 1982 – John Halls, English footballer and model
- 1982 – Lenka Tvarošková, Slovak tennis player
- 1983 – Callix Crabbe, Virgin Islander baseball player
- 1983 – Rocky Elsom, Australian rugby player
- 1983 – Bacary Sagna, French footballer
- 1984 – Matt Barr, American actor
- 1985 – Karima Adebibe, English model and actress
- 1985 – Tyler Clippard, American baseball player
- 1985 – Heart Evangelista, Filipino singer and actress
- 1985 – Philippe Senderos, Swiss footballer
- 1985 – Miki Yeung, Hong Kong singer and actress
- 1986 – Michael Ammermüller, German racing driver
- 1986 – Oliver Lee, English actor, director, and screenwriter
- 1986 – Gao Lin, Chinese footballer
- 1986 – Tiffany Thornton, American actress and singer
- 1987 – Edinson Cavani, Uruguayan footballer
- 1987 – Tom Pyatt, Canadian ice hockey player
- 1987 – David Wheater, English footballer
- 1987 – Candice Wiggins, American basketball player
- 1988 – Katie Boland, Canadian actress, producer, and screenwriter
- 1988 – Ángel Di María, Argentinian footballer
- 1988 – Siim Liivik, Estonian ice hockey player
- 1989 – Néstor Calderón, Mexican footballer
- 1989 – Adam Matuszczyk, Polish footballer
- 1989 – Emma Miskew, Canadian curler
- 1989 – Byron Mullens, American basketball player
- 1989 – Derek Norris, American baseball player
- 1989 – Brandon Sutter, Canadian ice hockey player
- 1989 – Jurij Tepeš, Slovenian ski jumper
- 1989 – Kristian Thomas, English gymnast
- 1990 – Chris Babb, American basketball player
- 1990 – Brett Dier, Canadian actor
- 1990 – Bogdan Kiselevich, Russian ice hockey player
- 1990 – Sefa Yılmaz, German-Turkish footballer
- 1991 – Karol G, Colombian singer and songwriter
- 1991 – Daniela Mona Lambin, Estonian footballer
- 1992 – Christian Eriksen, Danish footballer
- 1992 – Freddie Highmore, English actor
- 1992 – Petr Mrázek, Czech ice hockey player
- 1993 – Jadeveon Clowney, American football player
- 1993 – Alberto Rosende, American actor and singer
- 1996 – Nikolaj Ehlers, Danish ice hockey player
- 1996 – Poasa Faamausili, New Zealand rugby league player
- 1996 – Lucas Hernandez, French footballer
- 1997 – Jaehyun, South Korean singer and actor
- 1997 – Breel Embolo, Swiss footballer
- 1999 – Tyler Adams, American soccer player
- 2000 – Gabriel Moreno, Venezuelan baseball player
- 2002 – Jaxon Smith-Njigba, American football player

== Deaths ==
=== Pre-1600 ===
- 269 – Saint Valentine, Roman saint
- 869 – Cyril, Greek missionary bishop and saint (born 827)
- 945 – Lian Chongyu, Chinese general
- 945 – Zhu Wenjin, Chinese emperor
- 1009 – Bruno of Querfurt, German missionary bishop
- 1010 – Fujiwara no Korechika, Japanese nobleman (born 974)
- 1140 – Leo I, Armenian prince
- 1140 – Sobĕslav I, duke of Bohemia
- 1164 – Sviatoslav Olgovich, Kievan prince
- 1229 – Rǫgnvaldr Guðrøðarson, king of the Isles
- 1318 – Margaret of France, queen of England
- 1400 – Richard II, king of England (born 1367)
- 1440 – Dietrich of Oldenburg, German nobleman
- 1489 – Nicolaus von Tüngen, prince-bishop of Warmia
- 1528 – Edzard I, German nobleman (born 1462)
- 1549 – Il Sodoma, Italian painter (born 1477)

=== 1601–1900 ===
- 1676 – Abraham Bosse, French engraver and illustrator (born 1602)
- 1714 – Maria Luisa of Savoy, queen of Spain (born 1688)
- 1737 – Charles Talbot, 1st Baron Talbot, English lawyer and politician Lord Chancellor of Great Britain (born 1685)
- 1744 – John Hadley, English mathematician, invented the octant (born 1682)
- 1755 – Isidro de Espinosa, Franciscan missionary from Spanish Texas (born 1679)
- 1779 – James Cook, English captain, cartographer, and explorer (born 1728)
- 1780 – William Blackstone, English jurist and politician (born 1723)
- 1782 – Singu Min, Burmese king (born 1756)
- 1808 – John Dickinson, American lawyer and politician 5th Governor of Delaware (born 1732)
- 1831 – Vicente Guerrero, Mexican general and politician, 2nd President of Mexico (born 1782)
- 1831 – Henry Maudslay, English engineer (born 1771)
- 1870 – St. John Richardson Liddell, American general (born 1815)
- 1881 – Fernando Wood, American merchant and politician, 73rd Mayor of New York City (born 1812)
- 1884 – Lydia Hamilton Smith, African-American businesswoman (born 1813)
- 1885 – Jules Vallès, French journalist and author (born 1832)
- 1891 – William Tecumseh Sherman, American general (born 1820)
- 1894 – Eugène Charles Catalan, Belgian-French mathematician and academic (born 1814)

=== 1901–present ===
- 1910 – Giovanni Passannante, Italian anarchist (born 1849)
- 1922 – Heikki Ritavuori, Finnish lawyer and politician (born 1880; assassinated)
- 1923 – Charles Henry Turner, American zoologist, educator, and comparative psychologist (born 1867)
- 1924 – Amalie Andersen, Norwegian actress (born 1861)
- 1929 – Thomas Burke, American sprinter, coach, and lawyer (born 1875)
- 1930 – Thomas Mackenzie, Scottish-New Zealand cartographer and politician, 18th Prime Minister of New Zealand (born 1853)
- 1933 – Carl Correns, German botanist and geneticist (born 1864)
- 1937 – Erkki Melartin, Finnish composer (born 1875)
- 1942 – Adnan Saidi, Malayan lieutenant (born 1915)
- 1943 – Dora Gerson, German actress and singer (born 1899)
- 1943 – David Hilbert, Russian-German mathematician, physicist, and philosopher (born 1862)
- 1943 – Aleksander Meysztowicz, Polish politician and landowner (bron 1864)
- 1948 – Mordecai Brown, American baseball player and manager (born 1876)
- 1949 – Yusuf Salman Yusuf, Iraqi politician (born 1901)
- 1950 – Karl Guthe Jansky, American physicist and engineer (born 1905)
- 1952 – Maurice De Waele, Belgian cyclist (born 1896)
- 1956 – Harold Edward Dahl, American pilot and mercenary (born 1909)
- 1958 – Abdur Rab Nishtar, Pakistani politician, 2nd Governor of Punjab (born 1899)
- 1959 – Baby Dodds, American drummer (born 1898)
- 1967 – Sig Ruman, German-American actor (born 1884)
- 1969 – Vito Genovese, Italian-American mob boss (born 1897)
- 1970 – Bert Strudwick, English cricketer and coach (born 1880)
- 1974 – Stewie Dempster, New Zealand cricketer and coach (born 1903)
- 1975 – Julian Huxley, English biologist and eugenicist, co-founded the World Wide Fund for Nature (born 1887)
- 1975 – P. G. Wodehouse, English novelist and playwright (born 1881)
- 1976 – Gertrud Dorka, German archaeologist, prehistorian and museum director (born 1893)
- 1976 – George Washington Bacon III, American soldier, CIA agent, and mercenary (born 1946)
- 1976 – Charlie Christodoulou, British soldier and mercenary of the Angolan Civil War (born 1951)
- 1979 – Adolph Dubs, American lieutenant and diplomat, United States Ambassador to Afghanistan (born 1920)
- 1983 – Lina Radke, German runner and coach (born 1903)
- 1986 – Edmund Rubbra, English composer and conductor (born 1901)
- 1987 – Dmitry Kabalevsky, Russian pianist and composer (born 1904)
- 1988 – Frederick Loewe, German-American composer (born 1901)
- 1989 – James Bond, American ornithologist and zoologist (born 1900)
- 1989 – Vincent Crane, English pianist (born 1943)
- 1994 – Andrei Chikatilo, Soviet serial killer (born 1936)
- 1994 – Christopher Lasch, American historian and critic (born 1932)
- 1995 – Michael V. Gazzo, American actor and playwright (born 1923)
- 1995 – U Nu, Burmese politician, 1st Prime Minister of Burma (born 1907)
- 1996 – Bob Paisley, English footballer and manager (born 1919)
- 1998 – Peter Koch (wood scientist), American industrial engineer and wood scientist (born 1920)
- 1999 – John Ehrlichman, American lawyer and politician, 12th White House Counsel (born 1925)
- 1999 – Buddy Knox, American singer-songwriter and guitarist (born 1933)
- 2002 – Nándor Hidegkuti, Hungarian footballer and manager (born 1922)
- 2002 – Mick Tucker, English drummer (born 1947)
- 2003 – Johnny Longden, English jockey and trainer (born 1907)
- 2004 – Marco Pantani, Italian cyclist (born 1970)
- 2005 – Rafic Hariri, Lebanese businessman and politician, 60th Prime Minister of Lebanon (born 1944; assassinated)
- 2006 – Lynden David Hall, English singer-songwriter and producer (born 1974)
- 2007 – Ryan Larkin, Canadian animator and director (born 1943)
- 2007 – Gareth Morris, English flute player and educator (born 1920)
- 2008 – Perry Lopez, American actor (born 1929)
- 2009 – Bernard Ashley, English engineer and businessman, co-founded Laura Ashley plc (born 1926)
- 2009 – Louie Bellson, American drummer and composer (born 1924)
- 2010 – Doug Fieger, American singer-songwriter and guitarist (born 1952)
- 2010 – Dick Francis, Welsh jockey and author (born 1920)
- 2010 – Linnart Mäll, Estonian historian, orientalist, and translator (born 1938)
- 2011 – George Shearing, English-American pianist and composer (born 1919)
- 2012 – Mike Bernardo, South African boxer and martial artist (born 1969)
- 2012 – Tonmi Lillman, Finnish drummer and producer (born 1973)
- 2012 – Dory Previn, American singer-songwriter (born 1925)
- 2012 – Péter Rusorán, Hungarian swimmer, water polo player, and coach (born 1940)
- 2013 – Glenn Boyer, American historian and author (born 1924)
- 2013 – Ronald Dworkin, American philosopher and scholar (born 1931)
- 2014 – Tom Finney, English footballer (born 1922)
- 2014 – Chris Pearson, Canadian lawyer and politician, 1st Premier of Yukon (born 1931)
- 2014 – Mike Stepovich, American lawyer and politician, Governor of Alaska Territory (born 1919)
- 2015 – Louis Jourdan, French-American actor and singer (born 1921)
- 2015 – Philip Levine, American poet and academic (born 1928)
- 2015 – Franjo Mihalić, Croatian-Serbian runner and coach (born 1920)
- 2016 – Eric Lubbock, 4th Baron Avebury, English lieutenant, engineer, and politician (born 1928)
- 2016 – Steven Stucky, American composer and academic (born 1949)
- 2018 – Ruud Lubbers, Dutch politician and diplomat, Prime Minister and United Nations High Commissioner for Refugees (born 1939)
- 2018 – Morgan Tsvangirai, 2nd Prime Minister of Zimbabwe (born 1952)
- 2019 – Andrea Levy, English author (born 1956)
- 2021 – Carlos Menem, Argentine former president, lawyer, and statesman (born 1930)
- 2021 – William Meninger, American Trappist monk and a principal developer of Centering Prayer (born 1932)
- 2026 – Tom Noonan, American actor, director, and screenwriter (born 1951)

== Holidays and observances ==
- Christian feast day:
  - Cyril and Methodius, patron saints of Europe (Roman Catholic Church)
  - Eleuchadius
  - Manchan
  - Valentine (see also Valentine's Day)
  - Vicente Vilar David
  - February 14 (Eastern Orthodox liturgics)
- Statehood Day (Arizona, United States)
- Statehood Day (Oregon, United States)
- Presentation of Jesus at the Temple (Armenian Apostolic Church)
- Parents' Worship Day (parts of India)
