= Mercenaries in the Angolan Civil War =

Mercenaries in Angola (Portuguese: Mercenários em Angola) were foreigners who participated in the Angolan Civil War on the side of the MPLA or the rebels but were not military personnel of the interventionist states. Initially, the hired specialists were dominated by immigrants from western countries and "first world" states, such as the United States, UK, Ireland, France, Portugal, South Africa and Brazil. In the 1990s, they were displaced by natives of the former Soviet Republics, mainly Russians and Ukrainians.

== Western ==
In 1975, John Banks, an Englishman, recruited mercenaries to fight for the National Liberation Front of Angola (FNLA) against the Popular Movement for the Liberation of Angola (MPLA) in the civil war that broke out when Angola gained independence from Portugal in 1975. In the United States, David Bufkin, a self-proclaimed mercenary hero started a recruiting campaign in Soldier of Fortune magazine calling for anti-Communist volunteers, especially Vietnam veterans, to fight in Angola as mercenaries, claiming to be funded to the tune of $80,000 by the Central Intelligence Agency. Bufkin was in fact a former U.S. Army soldier "who has gone AWOL several times, has been tried for rape, and been in and out of jail several times", did not have $80,000, was not supported by the CIA, instead being a con-man who had stolen most of the money paid to him. Bufkin managed to get a dozen or so American mercenaries to Angola, where several of them were killed in action with the rest being captured.

One of the leaders of the mercenaries was Costas Georgiou (the self-styled "Colonel Callan"), who was described by the British journalist Patrick Brogan as a psychopathic killer who personally executed fourteen of his fellow mercenaries for cowardice, and who was extremely brutal to black people. Within 48 hours of his arrival in Angola, Georgiou had already led his men in disarming and massacring a group of FNLA fighters (his supposed allies), who he killed just for the "fun" of it all. At his trial, it was established that Georgiou had personally murdered at least 170 Angolans. Inept as a military leader as he was brutal, Georgiou notably failed as a commander. It was believed in 1975–76 that recruiting white mercenaries to fight in Angola would have a similar impact that the mercenaries had in the Congo in the 1960s, but in Angola the mercenaries failed completely as Brogan described their efforts as a "debacle". If anything, the white mercanaries with their disdain for blacks, or in the case of Georgiou murderous hatred seemed to have depressed morale on the FNLA side.

Many of the mercenaries in Angola were not former professional soldiers as they claimed to have been, but instead merely fantasists who had invented heroic war records for themselves. The fantasist mercenaries did not know how to use their weapons properly, and often injured themselves and others when they attempted to use weaponry that they did not fully understand, leading to some of them being executed by the psychopathic killer Georgiou who did not tolerate failure. On 27 January 1976, a group of 96 British mercenaries arrived in Angola and within a week about dozen had accidentally maimed themselves by trying to use weapons that they falsely claimed to be proficient with. The MLPA forces were better organized and led, and the dispatch of 35, 000 Cuban Army troops in November 1975 decided the war for the MLPA. Cuban accounts of the Angolan war speak of the efforts of the mercenaries in a tone of contempt as Cuban veterans contend that the mercenaries were poor soldiers who they had no trouble defeating.

When captured, John Derek Barker's role as a leader of mercenaries in Northern Angola led the judges to send him to face the firing squad. Nine others were imprisoned. Three more were executed: American Daniel Gearhart was sentenced to death for advertising himself as a mercenary in an American newspaper; Andrew McKenzie and Costas Georgiou, who had both served in the British army, were sentenced to death for murder. Georgiou was shot by firing squad in 1976. Costas' cousin Charlie Christodoulou was killed in an ambush.

Executive Outcomes employees, Captains Daniele Zanata and Raif St Clair (who was also involved in the aborted Seychelles Coup of 1981), fought on behalf of the MPLA against the National Union for the Total Independence of Angola (UNITA) in the 1990s in violation of the Lusaka Protocol.

== PMC ==
Executive Outcomes initially trained and later fought on behalf of the Angolan government against UNITA after UNITA refused to accept the election results in 1992. This contract was awarded to the company after EO had assisted Ranger Oil with an equipment recovery operation in the harbour town of Soyo. Dubbed by the South African media as an attempt to assassinate the rebel leader Dr. Jonas Savimbi, EO found itself under constant UNITA attacks where it lost three of its men. This action saw EO as being recognised by the FAA and a contract to train its forces was awarded. In a short space of time, UNITA was defeated on the battlefield and sued for peace. The Angolan government, under pressure from the UN and the US, were forced to terminate EO's contract. EO was replaced by the UN's peacekeeping force known as UNAVEM. Angola returned to war shortly thereafter.

== Former Soviet Union ==
Mercenaries from the former Soviet republics fought for both the MPLA and the rebels

The influx of mercenaries from the former soviet republics was caused by mass unemployment of the military after the fall of the Eastern Bloc. Due to the cheapness of services and the demand for specialists in the operation of soviet equipment, they displaced western mercenaries.

Pilots dominated among them, mainly from Russia and Ukraine. There were also specialists in the use of MANPADS. According to the Security Service of Ukraine for 2000, during the year, natives of the former USSR participated at least 150 times in clashes and battles (including in the air) against each other. In total, at least 400 hired pilots on the side of the government forces and almost the same number on the side of the rebels were registered in the conflict, according to the publication «Version». At least a hundred of them died.

== Brazil ==
In October 1999, UNITA alleged that the FAA Embraer EMB 312 Tucanos used during Operation Restore were crewed by Brazilian pilots on contract to the Angolan government. UNITA subsequently declared "that anything within the Angolan national territory, identified as Brazil's interest, is... considered a target and will not be spared" from their attacks.

== See also ==
- Luanda Trial

== Publications ==
- Вальдес, Виво Рауль. Ангола: крах мифа о наемниках [Текст] : [Пер. с исп.] / [Предисл. О. Игнатьева]. - Москва : Прогресс, 1978. - 93 с., 8 л. ил. : ил.; 16 см.
- Роберт К. Браун. Хочешь жить — выкручивайся сам: воспоминания наёмника в Анголе // Солдат Удачи : журнал — №11. — 1994.
