= Hessing =

Hessing is a surname. Notable people with the surname include:

- Geertjan Hessing, former band member of Catapult
- John Hessing (died 1803), army officer in India
- Mona Hessing (1933–2001), Australian fibre artist and weaver
- Valjean McCarty Hessing (1934–2006), Native American artist
