= Joseph Adams =

Joseph Adams may refer to:

== Politics ==
- Joe Adams (Missouri politician) (born 1944), member of the Missouri House of Representatives
- Joseph Adams (Maine politician) (1779–1850), American politician from Maine
- Joseph Adams (Pennsylvania politician) (born 1962/3), member of the Pennsylvania House of Representatives
- J. Allen Adams (Joseph Allen "Al" Adams, 1932–2017), American politician and lawyer in North Carolina

== Sports ==
- Joe Adams (quarterback) (born 1958), American football player
- Joe Adams (wide receiver) (born 1989), American football player
- Joe Adams (baseball) (1877–1952), American baseball player
- Joe Adams (footballer, born 2001), Welsh footballer
- Joe Adams (footballer, born 2004), Guernsey footballer

== Other people ==
- Joseph Adams (businessman) (1700–1737), British-born Canadian governor of the Hudson's Bay Company
- Joseph Adams (mercenary) (Joe S. "Tirador" Adams, Jr, fl. 1980s), American private investigator and mercenary
- Joseph Adams (physician) (1756–1818), British physician and surgeon
- Joseph Alexander Adams (1803–1880), American engraver and electrotyper
- Joseph D. Adams, founder in 1885 of J. D. Adams & Company
- Joseph Quincy Adams Jr. (1880–1946), Shakespeare scholar
- Joe Adams (actor) (1924–2018), "The Man Behind The Man", American actor
