= Joseph Adam =

Joseph Adam may refer to:

- Joseph Adam (athlete) (born 1965), Seychellois sprinter
- Joseph Johann Adam (1690–1732), Prince of Liechtenstein
- Joe Adam, American football coach

== See also ==
- Joseph Adams (disambiguation)
