= Gary Acker =

American mercenary (1954–2001)

- Born: October 25, 1954; Sacramento, California, U.S.
- Died: November 7, 2001 (aged 47); Sacramento, California, U.S.
- Burial place: Sacramento Memorial Lawn Cemetery, Sacramento, California
- Education: C. K. McClatchy High School
- Spouse: Dora Carolina
- Military career
- Allegiance: United States; FNLA
- Branch: United States Marine Corps
- Service years: United States 1972–1975; FNLA 1976
- Rank: United States Lance Corporal; FNLA Lieutenant
- Conflicts: Angolan Civil War (WIA) (POW)

Gary Martin Acker (October 25, 1954 – November 7, 2001) was an American mercenary who was sentenced to 16 years in prison during the Luanda Trial, of which he served 7.

== Early life and military service ==
Gary Acker was born in 1954 to Joyce and Carl Acker.

Soon after graduating C. K. McClatchy High School in 1972, Acker, wanting to fight communism, joined the United States Marine Corps intent to fight in the Vietnam War. He was disappointed when fighting ended, ultimately serving six months aboard the USS Ranger. He was chosen to fill an opening at the Naval Academy Preparatory School, but dropped out after three months. Afterwards he was shipped off to Camp Lejeune, but there he was demoted from Corporal to Lance Corporal, diagnosed as a 'severe schizophrenic passive aggressive', and given a general discharge for behavior that included alluding that he may harm a Lieutenant he believed was harassing him.

== Angolan Civil War ==
At some point after his discharge Acker saw an article reprinted in the Sacramento Bee regarding recruitment of mercenaries for the Angolan Civil War. He was recruited by David Bufkin, paying for his and Bufkin's tickets at Fresno Airport on December 26, 1975. They'd go on to meet Frank Mariano and Lobo del Sol, and the four stayed at a combination of Bufkin's house and Hilton Hotels, the latter of which Acker would have to pay for as well. As flights into Angola were delayed due to the capture of Uíge, the three helped Bufkin publish his paper Mercenary Forces Group, until Acker began running out of his Marine Corps savings and returned home in January 1976.

However, soon after returning home Lobo del Sol called him to double check before the group was to head for Angola, and Acker relented, joining them. They met in New York with other American mercenaries, including Gus Grillo and Daniel Gearhart, boarding a plane at John F. Kennedy International Airport before changing flights to Kinshasa at Charles de Gaulle Airport. Arriving in Zaire late on February 7, 1976, they were harassed and bribed by airport security and Zairian Armed Forces over issues regarding their vaccination cards, where they lost roughly $77 as well as their passports before an FNLA General arrived.

They met up with Nick Hall and Colonel Peter McAleese before proceeding to São Salvador, when the group quickly began to uncover suspicious behavior from Bufkin, ranging from owing others than Acker hundreds of dollars, false promises about the number of mercenaries already in-country, and plans to flee back to the States. Together they entered his hotel room and opened his bag, where they found a Walther P38 and an Uzi. Bufkin was brought to his room and 'court-martialed' by the men, who decided he'd be stripped of his cash, rank in the FNLA, and sent to the front lines. They reported this to Colonel McAleese, who upheld it.

Acker and his group would later meet up with Holden Roberto where the mercenaries were offered equipment. Acker took a FN Browning 9mm and MG 42, giving Bufkin's Uzi to fellow American mercenary and ex-CIA Officer George Bacon. On February 11 Acker, was involved in training FNLA recruits, including at least one child soldier.

From February 13 to 14, Acker alongside Bacon were on patrol around the perimeter of São Salvador, with the intent to slow down any Cuban advance and destroy a bridge before pulling out. While they encountered no Cuban forces on the 13th, on the 14th Acker and Bacon were in a Land Rover driven by Portuguese driver Fernando, along with Douglas 'Canada' Newby and three British mercenaries, when they came to the rear stake-bed truck of an enemy column that included BDRMs. The FAPLA and Cubans opened fire on the Rover, shredding it. Bacon shoved Acker from the Rover as both were struck; Acker in the left calf while Bacon was hit multiple times, dying near instantly. As Acker attempted to crawl away clutching his MG 42, he found his bootlaces were tangled with the now deceased Bacon's laces and had to shake him off. Acker decided to play dead on the side of the road, and heard a wounded Canada, who had been hit in both legs and lost his right thumb, demanding to be executed rather than treated. Eventually it was noticed Acker was breathing, and he was treated by a Cuban medic before being placed in the back of a truck with Canada and a wounded FAPLA member, who Acker suspected was hit by friendly fire as he doubts the mercenaries got a shot off during the encounter. Acker and Canada were the only survivors.

They were taken to Luanda and held with other American and European mercenaries captured in separate incidents, including Grillo and Gearhart. Canada would die of his wounds on the second night there. At the following Luanda Trial, Acker's parents borrowed $5,000 to send American defense lawyers Robert Cesner Jr. and Bill Wilson to their son's defense. Ultimately Acker was sentenced to 16 years in prison, Grillo to 30 years, and Gearhart to death.

During his sentence Acker experienced the 1977 Angolan coup d'état attempt during which he was almost killed, but was more interested in the use of an MP43/44 by one of the Nitistas at the time than his own fate.

He was released in November 1982 after serving 7 years of his 16-year sentence as part of a prisoner exchange deal involving Soviet troops held in South Africa.

== Later life ==
Gary Acker would go on to marry Dora Carolina (née Salazar). He died on November 7, 2001. His funeral was held on November 15, 2001.
