= George Bacon (CIA officer) =

American soldier (1946–1976)

George Bacon George Washington Bacon III
- Born: August 4, 1946; North Carolina, United States
- Died: February 14, 1976 (aged 29); Angola
- Military career
- Allegiance: United States; FNLA
- Branch: United States Army Special Forces; Central Intelligence Agency
- Service years: 1966–1970 (Army); 1970–1975 (CIA)
- Unit: MACV-SOG
- Conflicts: Vietnam War (WIA); Cambodian Civil War; Laotian Civil War; Angolan Civil War †
- Awards: Intelligence Star

George Washington Bacon III (August 4, 1946 – February 14, 1976) was an American soldier and intelligence officer. He served as a Green Beret in the U.S. Army, Paramilitary Officer in the Central Intelligence Agency (CIA), and finally as a mercenary soldier.

Bacon is remembered as a talented eccentric whose hatred of communism was so great he disobeyed orders to refrain from combat while he served in Vietnam as a member of MACV-SOG. Although trained as a combat medic, he joined raids into Cambodia during Operation Menu.

Following discharge from the U.S. Army, Bacon spent time as a civilian before joining the Central Intelligence Agency. He worked as a case officer for them during the Secret War in Laos through 1975. After supposedly leaving the CIA, he became an anti-communist mercenary in the Angolan Civil War, though he may have been working undercover. He was killed in action while attempting to demolish a crucial highway bridge to block an enemy advance.

== Vietnam ==
Bacon served in the Vietnam War as a Green Beret during 1968–1969. He was trained as a combat medic. He is remembered as a skinny man with very wide shoulders, a piercing stare from under the brim of an ugly floppy hat, and a reputation for eccentricity. His linguistic talent led him to master Vietnamese and the Bru language while serving in Vietnam. At one time, he served on Recon Team Sidewinder of MACV-SOG.

On 23 August 1968, he was at MACV-SOG's Command and Control North base to be considered for promotion. He was unfortunate enough to be napping directly in the path of an attacking force of PAVN sappers; he was severely wounded in the shoulder.

Because Bacon's medical training was considered too valuable to hazard, especially considering that MACV-SOG's casualty rate exceeded 100%, he was ordered to remain on base at the Command and Control North headquarters. Instead, outraged by denial of the chance to directly battle communism, he went absent without leave southward to Command and Control Central, and finagled his way onto MACV-SOG's Recon Team Illinois. In May 1969, in a memorable operation, Bacon infiltrated into Cambodia as a member of this team. It was tasked with gathering bomb damage assessment in the wake of the third Operation Menu B-52 raid. Team Illinois was inserted only 20 minutes after the bombing, with the intention of capturing a stunned enemy soldier for military intelligence interrogation. The team had to shoot its way out, with Bacon and John Plaster laying down heavy suppressive fire.

== United States ==
After discharge from the military, Bacon had difficulty reintegrating into civilian life. He alternated between working for the CIA, and an administrative position at University of Massachusetts. What he perceived as the ineptitude of higher-ups in the CIA at running covert operations frustrated him. The liberal politics of the campus infuriated him. He took solace in riding a home-built Harley-Davidson, and rocketing around town in his battered Morris Minor while training with the CIA.

== Laos ==
He then turned his military expertise to account as a case officer for the Central Intelligence Agency. His offbeat behavior at Camp Peary bothered his CIA handlers, as Bacon carried around his pet gerbils during training, chewed incessantly on a toothbrush, and secured his Rolex watch with a cord for a wristband.

Bacon was still only 24 years old. After completing training, the CIA shipped him off to the Kingdom of Laos to serve in the Laotian Civil War. He relieved Robert Burr Smith as the liaison to General Vang Pao, and quickly picked up Lao. At some point, he also learned Mandarin.

Subsequently, he was assigned to be the regimental adviser to Groupe Mobile-24 on the Plain of Jars in June 1971. Using the radio call sign Kayak, he led his mixed band of Lao and Thai irregulars into battle, only to be chastised for risking himself. Nevertheless, George Bacon led his guerrilla band into offensives through war's end.

His roommate in Laos related some of Bacon's oddities. He stated that Bacon would strip naked at bedtime, then lie in his bunk through the night crunching crackers and reading obscure books and articles. He was notably a lone hand, though he got along with his fellow case officers.

== Angola ==
After serving his tour in Laos, Bacon left the Agency. Even though his efforts in Laos had earned an Intelligence Star, he was so disgusted with American policy that he apparently quit the CIA. He then went to Angola, where he was killed in action in an ambush while working as a mercenary. His cover story was that he was a freelance journalist for Soldier of Fortune magazine.

It took Bacon a couple of tries to join the mercenaries being hired by the National Liberation Front of Angola in 1975; they suspected him of being a CIA plant. Once recruited, he flew to Kinshasa on February 6, 1976, to report for duty with Colonel Callan. He was greeted with a telephone call from the American Embassy, ordering him back to the United States. Despite his becoming aware that the mercenary force was poorly organized and supported, with few members, many of dubious martial ability, Bacon remained committed to crossing the border into the fighting in Angola. The Cuban-backed MPLA was beating them badly there. The mercenaries were outnumbered thousands to one. Bacon turned to providing weapons training to local soldiery, instructing 10 to 20 at a time.

On February 14, 1976, in a symbolic act of resistance, the mercenaries decided to block the MPLA's mechanized advance by blowing up a concrete highway bridge. Bacon, accompanied by several other mercenaries, mined the bridge for demolition before departing. They were fleeing the scene in a Land Rover when they ran into the rear stake-bed truck of an enemy column of dozens of vehicles. The Land Rover was riddled with enemy bullets before the soldiers of fortune could open fire. Before dying of multiple wounds, Bacon shoved fellow mercenary Gary Acker from the Land Rover.

On February 26, 1976, the American Embassy in Kinshasa reported Bacon's death in action in Angola. Three other American citizens, originally reported killed in the same ambush, would later be tried by a People's Revolutionary Tribune. He may have still been working undercover for the CIA at the time of his death. Secretary of State Henry Kissinger, who oversaw the attempted return of Bacon's remains, acknowledged him as a mercenary. He was the sole American killed in Angola.

== Legacy ==
George Bacon III's remains were never recovered. He is memorialized by a scholarship established by his family at University of Louisiana-Monroe.
