= John Hessing =

Dutch-born officer in Maratha service (1739–1803)

- Born: 5 November 1739; Utrecht, Netherlands
- Died: July 21, 1803 (aged 63); Agra, India
- Military career
- Allegiance: Maratha Empire
- Service years: Unknown – 1803
- Rank: Colonel
- Conflicts: Battle of Kharda

Colonel John William Hessing (5 November 1739 – 21 July 1803) was a Dutch military officer who served in the armies of the Maratha Empire in the late 18th and early 19th centuries.

== Biography ==
Hessing commanded 3,000 Maratha regular troops in the Battle of Kharda, where the Maratha armies defeated the Nizam of Hyderabad on 12 March 1795.

Due to ill health, he resigned his command of four battalions in 1800, being succeeded by his son, George Hessing, who was then 18. John Hessing took instead a position as Commandant of Agra Fort, and died in Agra on 21 July 1803 while in command of the Maratha forces there.

In June 1801 George Hessing commanded four battalions outside Ujjain, which were attacked and defeated by Yashwantrao Holkar, the Maratha ruler of Indore.

== Tomb ==
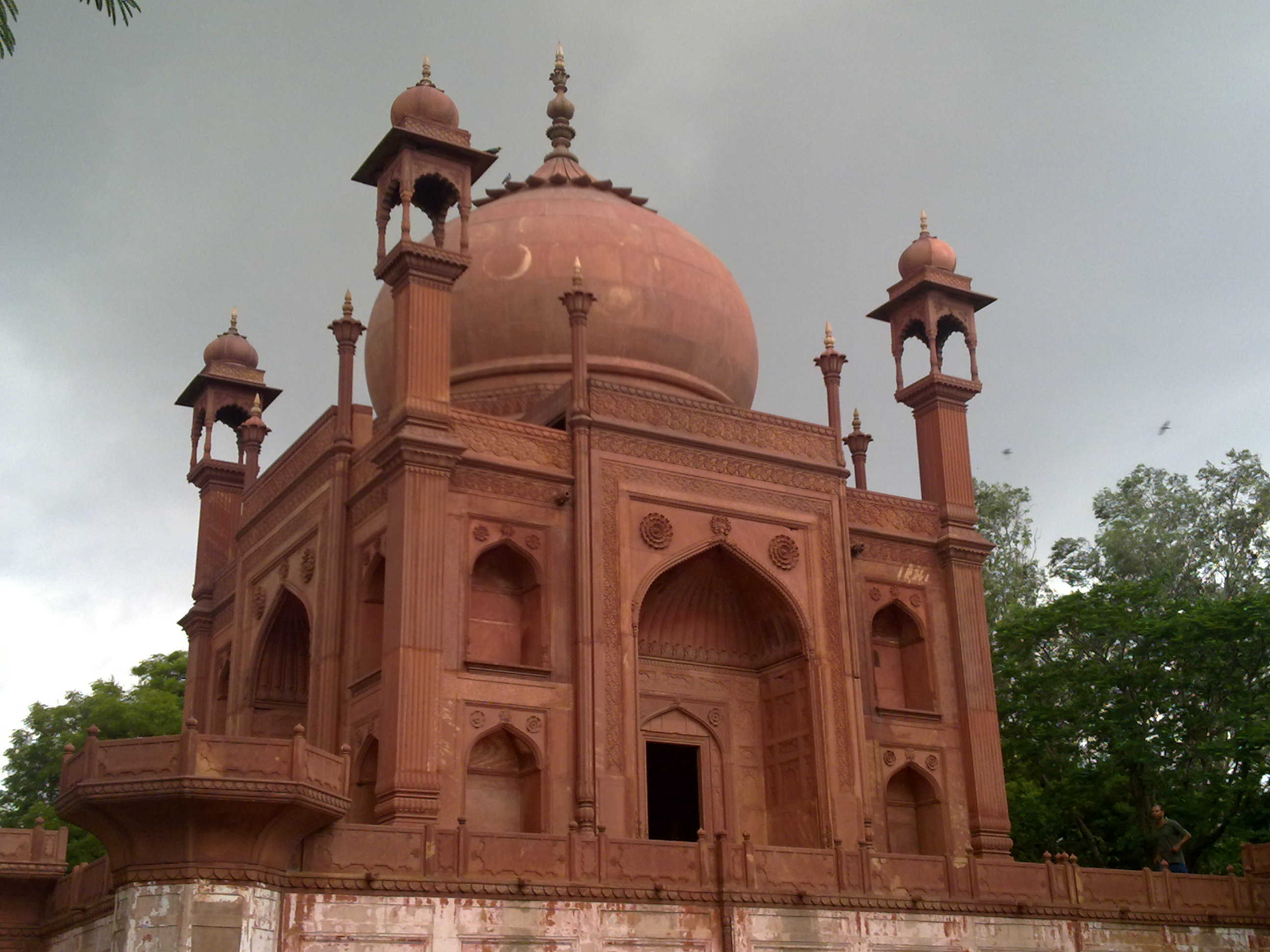
The "Red Taj Mahal", the tomb of John Hessing

John Hessing's tomb is located in the Padretola, or Padresanto, a Roman Catholic cemetery in Agra. The tomb was commissioned by Hessing's wife, Anne Derridon. The tomb is a scale replica of the Taj Mahal in red sandstone. The tomb, which was completed in or about the year of the British conquest, bears an inscription in English stating that Hessing was a Dutchman, who died Commandant of Agra, in his 63rd year, 21 July 1803, just before Lake's successful siege of the place.
