= Battle of Ujjain =

Coordinates: 23.1°N 75.7°E

- Part of Holkar Scindia War
| Date | August–July 1801 |
| Location | Ujjain, Madhya Pradesh |
| Result | Scindia victory |
| Territorial changes | Ujjain recovered by Daulat Rao Sindhia |

Belligerents
| House of Holkar | House of Scindia |

Commanders and leaders
| Yashwantrao Holkar | Daulat Rao Sindhia |

Strength
| Unknown | Unknown |

Casualties and losses
| Unknown | Unknown |

The Battle of Ujjain took place on 18 July 1801 near Ujjain between the rival factions of the Maratha Empire.

In July 1801, Yashwantrao Holkar attacked Sindhia's capital Ujjain, and after defeating Sindhia's army led by John Hessing, extorted a large sum from its inhabitants, but did not ravage the town. In this war nearly 3,000 soldiers of Sindhia's army were killed.. However on 20 August Sarji Rao Ghatge arrived in the camp of Scindia, on his arrival he not only defeated Holkar but also recovered Ujjain

== Battle ==
In July 1801, Yashwantrao Holkar attacked Sindhia's army, led by Colonel Hessing, which had eight battalions stationed at Ujjain. After a hotly fought battle on July 18, Holkar was victorious. He did not immediately plunder the city, though. It was only on September 1 that he entered Ujjain and levied a war indemnity of fifteen lakhs of rupees. Even after this need, he was given only a part of that, roughly one-eighth, since the rest was embezzled by his own men.

In the meantime, on 20th August, Sarji Rao Ghatge came over to Daulat Rao Sindhia's army with quick strategic acumen and firm command. During this period, Daulat Rao was able to win over Dudere-nic and his son-in-law Plumet to Holkar's army. A combined force, consisting of six battalions under Filose and Brownrigg and 25,000 horse, moved towards Ujjain. Holkar evacuated the city in reply, and Sindhia's troops recaptured it. Sarji Rao Ghatge then turned the campaign towards Indore.

== Citations ==
=== Sources ===
- Naravane, M. S. (2014). Battles of the honourable East India Company : making of the Raj. New Delhi: A.P.H. Pub. Corp. ISBN 9788131300343.
