= Spear Operations Group =

American private military company

- Industry: Security
- Predecessor: Global Strategic Group
- Defunct: October 2018
- Owner: Abraham Golan

Spear Operations Group was a private military company based in Delaware that was hired by the United Arab Emirates to carry out operations in Yemen to support the Emirati intervention in the Yemeni Civil War. It was founded by Abraham Golan, a Hungarian-Israeli security contractor.

The company was approached by Mohammad Dahlan on behalf of the UAE to carry out assassinations in Yemen as part of the Yemeni Civil War (2015–present), which may be a violation of the US War Crimes Act of 1996.

In 2015, Golan embedded himself and a team of veterans from American SOF and the French Foreign Legion within the Emirati military, which supplied the team with weapons, uniforms, Emirati military ranks and identity tags. By 2016, Spear Operations Group had replaced the Legionnaires with Americans.

On 29 December 2015, Spear Operations Group began its operations in Yemen with a failed assassination attempt on Anssaf Ali Mayo, the local leader of Islamist political party Al-Islah.

Though the first operation failed, the team stayed on in Yemen for several more months and claimed credit for a number of other high-profile assassinations. Their targets included other members of al-Islah, nonviolent clerics, and some "out and out terrorists."

After Spear Operations Group's assassinations were made public by an October 2018 BuzzFeed News report, US Senators Elizabeth Warren and Bob Menendez wrote letters to the State Department demanding answers about Spear Operations Group, focusing on whether the federal government knew about their involvement in the war in Yemen. Warren also sent a letter to the Justice Department calling for an investigation into the group. In December 2025, DeMayo filed a lawsuit against Spear Operations group in Federal Court.
