= Frank Camper =

American veteran, writer and mercenary

- Born: Joseph Franklin Camper Jr; 1946 (age 79–80); Hueytown, Alabama, U.S.
- Occupations: Writer, mercenary
- Parents: Frank Camper (father); Betty Camper (mother)

Joseph Franklin Camper Jr (born 1946) is an American veteran, mercenary, and writer. Camper served in the Vietnam War in the late 1960s, after which he began working as a mercenary and FBI informant. In 1980, he established a mercenary training school on the Warrior River in Jefferson County, Alabama, which ran up until Camper was arrested in 1986. He has written both fiction and non-fiction books about his service and time as a mercenary, as well as books related to military tactics and survival skills.

== Early career ==
Camper wrote he served as part of a long-range reconnaissance patrol unit with the Second Brigade Fourth Infantry Division in Vietnam from 1965 to 1969. Military records released in 1985 say he was trained as an infantryman and truck driver, and deployed in Vietnam from July 1966 to May 1967. Camper's actual highly classified background with military intelligence, CIA, ATF, and FBI was released in July 1988 when he testified before the Subcommittee on Terrorism, Narcotics, and Internal Operations of the Committee On Foreign Relations, explaining the conflicting intelligent community cover stories. Such claims was he was recruited by the FBI in 1970 to work as an undercover informant. He was first tasked with infiltrating political organisations like CPUSA branches, later posing as a military advisor to radical groups like the Alabama Black Liberation Front.

== Mercenary school ==
In 1980, Camper opened The Mercenary School near Dolemite, Alabama. The training provided covered a variety of fields, including physical exercises, firearms, melee and hand-to-hand combat training. The school was opened under the parent organisation the Mercenary Association, along with gun and survivalist store Survival Shack National in nearby Troy, Alabama. The school was advertised through military affairs magazines like Soldier of Fortune, and charged $350 for a two-week course.

Camper would later say he opened the school with two founding principles, to "enable the U.S. government to gain a great deal of intelligence and indeed initiate many operations that were successful to stop criminals and terrorists", and "to get and prove out possible foreigners who would work for the U.S. government in the future." From 1981 to 1986, Camper and the school received approximately $25,000 (equivalent to $73,429 in 2025) from the U.S. government in connection with this work. Information about the school's students was passed onto the government by Camper.

In March 1981, Camper, fellow instructor Robert Lisenby, and 11 students were arrested on trespassing charges, 2 miles from the Crystal River Nuclear Plant in Citrus County, Florida. The group was hiking through a private 13,000-acre ranch, wearing camouflage fatigues and carrying knives, bayonets, and automatic rifles. Federal authorities initially thought the group was conducting an armed raid on the plant. Camper had been using a topographical map from 1954 for navigation and said he was unaware of the plant or ranch's presence. The hike was part of a 5-week training course, including students from Michigan, Canada, and Mexico. The group was held in county jail for 22 hours, before each being released on a bond of $1,050 (equivalent to $3,718 in 2025). Camper was later fined $1,060, the highest amount possible for a misdemeanour trespassing charge, while the other 11 were fined $1,000. After the trespassing incident, Camper bought a heavily wooded 77-acre plot in rural Jefferson County, Alabama on the Warrior River to serve as a training site.

In April, Camper, along with his business partner and fellow camp instructor Robert Lisenby were arrested in Miami. Police had stopped their rental car after an FBI tip and found homemade explosives and automatic weapons. Lisenby was alleged to have been plotting to detonate bombs in Little Havana as part of an assassination attempt, and Camper had informed the FBI about Lisenby's plan before it went ahead. The charges against Camper were dropped, and he later served as a key witness in Lisenby's prosecution. Lisenby plead guilty to the explosives and firearms charges, and was sentenced to 10 years in prison in October 1981.

Camper applied for a private school license with the Alabama Department of Education in 1981. With a more permissive license, Camper planned to expand into areas like teaching self-defence skills to office workers, and more advanced law enforcement training. The application was ignored by the department, and Camper was threatened with prosecution if the school continued to operate without a license. He announced he was restructuring the school into a self-defense club after the threat, but continued operating.

Actor Robert Duvall trained at the school in 1985 in preparation for his role in Let's Get Harry, a 1986 action film where he played a mercenary assisting a group of plumbers in rescuing their friend from Colombian paramilitaries. Duvall received training in hand-to-hand combat and knife fighting at the school.

=== Sikh training ===
Four Sikh nationalists trained at the school in 1984 would later go onto plan a foiled assassination attempt on Indian Prime Minister Rajiv Gandhi. At the school, Camper trained them in weapons and explosives, hand-to-hand combat, and assassination techniques. During their visit, Camper said he discussed the planning of multiple terror attacks inside of India with them, including poisoning the Mumbai water supply.

When he learnt their plans had changed and they actually intended to assassinate Gandhi during his upcoming visit to Washington, D.C., Camper assisted the FBI in setting up a sting operation to arrest the plotters. "They were very open with their politics and led us to believe they were going to do what they wanted to do in India, but what they wanted to do was bring [the terrorism] here," Camper later said. Two students who escaped the arrest and ensuing manhunt used explosives stolen from Camper's school to conduct the 1985 Air India bombings. Camper later blamed the failure to arrest all of the suspects on information he passed on being mishandled by the agencies.

=== Fire bomb plot ===
In 1985, California nursery and elementary school operators Charlotte Wychoff and Elizabeth Leta Hamilton approached Camper after seeing him demonstrate incendiary devices on a cable TV show. They hired Camper to firebomb the cars of Robyn Richoff and Harriet Russo, former employees of the pair who had complained to state agencies about their dismissals. In August, Camper and three other instructors drove out to California and both cars were firebombed, but no one was injured. On May 21, 1986, Camper and the three instructors involved in the bombings were arrested in Hueytown, Alabama.

After his arrest, the Alabama Attorney General Charles Graddick submitted a lawsuit to close the school, claiming it was operating without a valid state private school license and training "mercenaries, terrorists, and guerrillas". While on bail awaiting trial, Camper announced his retirement as a mercenary, and opened a small computer business in Alabama named ABC Computers. He shared with media more details about his work as both an informant and mercenary.

=== Conviction ===
In 1987, Camper was convicted of federal weapons, conspiracy and racketeering charges related to the car bombings, and was sentenced to 14 years in federal prison. In December, Camper was attacked with boiling water while in USP Leavenworth after a 60 Minutes interview with him discussing his work as a federal informant aired.

He was released from prison in December 1991 after serving 5 1/2 years. He is now retired, and lives in Birmingham, Alabama with his wife.

== Senate testimony ==
In 1988, Camper testified in a public hearing of the Senate Foreign Relations Committee into the Iran-Contra affair about his work as a mercenary in Central America during the early 1980s. Camper said he'd worked with a squad of Panamanian commandos who were loyal to dictator Manuel Noriega and involved in drug trafficking, which he reported to US intelligence. A report written by Camper and sent to military intelligence back in December 1984 was released by the committee, detailing a plan for Contra forces and American mercenaries to collaborate on combating the Sandinistas in Nicaragua.

== Mind control ==
In his book The MK/Ultra Secret, Camper argued that Lee Harvey Oswald was the subject of a CIA mind control project of the 1950s, and the assassination of John F. Kennedy was organized by a team of disgruntled right-wing politicians.

== Publications ==
- The Mission (Manor Books, 1979)
- Sandcastles (Manor Books, 1980)
- Mercenary Operations Manuel (Desert Publishing, 1986)
- L.R.R.P.: The Professional (Dell Publishing, 1988)
- Merc: Professional (Dell Publishing, 1988)
- Long Range Recon Patrol (Namiki Shobo [Japan], 1990)
- Covert Operations (Ashai Sonarama [Japan], 1991)
- Special Operations (Ashai Sonarama [Japan], 1991)
- Shamal (Ashai Sonarama [Japan], 1992)
- High Seas Security (Loompanics, 1993)
- Live To Spend It: A Mercenary Guide for the 90s (Delta Press, 1994)
- The MK/Ultra Secret (Christopher Scott Publishing, 1997)
- Mindbenders (Zinn Communication, 1999)
