= Joseph Adams (Maine politician) =

American politician (1779–1850)

Joseph Adams (July 13, 1779 – August 23, 1850) was an American politician from Maine. Born in Wayland, Massachusetts, Adams eventually moved to the part of Massachusetts that would become Maine. As a resident of Gorham, he was a delegate to the 1819 Maine Constitutional Convention. After moving to Portland, he was elected to the Maine House of Representatives, where he was one of three who represented Portland in the 4th Legislature (1824). He died in 1850 in Providence, Rhode Island.
