= Dolomite, Alabama =

Unincorporated community in Alabama, United States

- Unincorporated community
- Location within Alabama Location within the United States
- Coordinates: 33°27′46″N 86°57′41″W
- Country: United States
- State: Alabama
- County: Jefferson
- Elevation: 520 ft (160 m)
- Time zone: UTC-6 (Central (CST))
  - Summer (DST): UTC-5 (CDT)
- ZIP code: 35061
- Area codes: 205, 659
- GNIS feature ID: 117364

Dolomite is an unincorporated community in Jefferson County, Alabama, United States. Today much of the community's residential neighborhoods lie within the corporate limits of the City of Birmingham and much of its business district lie within the corporate limits of the City of Hueytown.

The most notable landmark is the Bethlehem United Methodist Church, which was established in 1818, before Alabama was admitted as a state to the Union. Its adjoining church cemetery contains the graves of some of Jefferson County's early pioneer settlers, such as James Tarrant, Mortimer Jordan, and Isaac Wellington Sadler.

== Notable person ==
- Frank Camper, former U.S. Army soldier and mercenary
- Paul Lehner, baseball player.
