= Abraham Golan =

Hungarian-born Israeli-French-American security contractor

Avraham Golan
- אברהם גולן
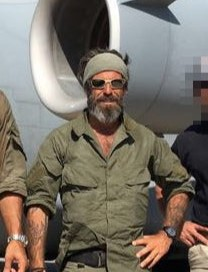
- Golan in front of a UAE military aircraft
- Born: Hungary
- Military career
- Allegiance: France, Israel, Hungary, USA
- Branch: French Foreign Legion
- Rank: Major (France)
- Nickname: Malachi
- Unit: Commando Parachute Group
- Other work: Spear Operations Group

Avraham Golan, also spelled Abraham Golan (Hebrew: אברהם גולן), is a Hungarian-Israeli security contractor known as the founder of Spear Operations Group, a private military company (PMC) that conducted high-profile operations in Yemen. His work in Yemen—especially assassination missions targeting political figures—was contracted by the United Arab Emirates (UAE) and has led to international scrutiny regarding the ethics and legality of private military operations in active conflict zones.

== Background ==
Golan holds dual citizenship in Hungary and Israel, with a background that includes service in the French Foreign Legion, Israeli Defense Forces and experience in the private security sector across Africa. His expertise eventually led him to the United States, where he continued his career in defense contracting and founded Spear Operations Group in 2015.

Daniel Corbett, a former DEVGRU operative who was employed by Golan described him as a possible veteran of the French Foreign Legion and implied that Golan had done work for the State of Israel.

== Founding of Spear Operations Group ==
Spear Operations Group, established in Delaware, USA, initially hired American military veterans and former French Foreign Legion soldiers to fulfill contracts with the UAE in Yemen. Under Golan's leadership, the group pursued the UAE's objectives within the Yemeni Civil War, targeting high-ranking members of Al-Islah, Yemen's Islamist political party affiliated with the Muslim Brotherhood. The UAE viewed Al-Islah as a threat to its influence and national security interests in Yemen and contracted Spear for covert, targeted operations. Spear Operations Group was dissolved in October 2018.

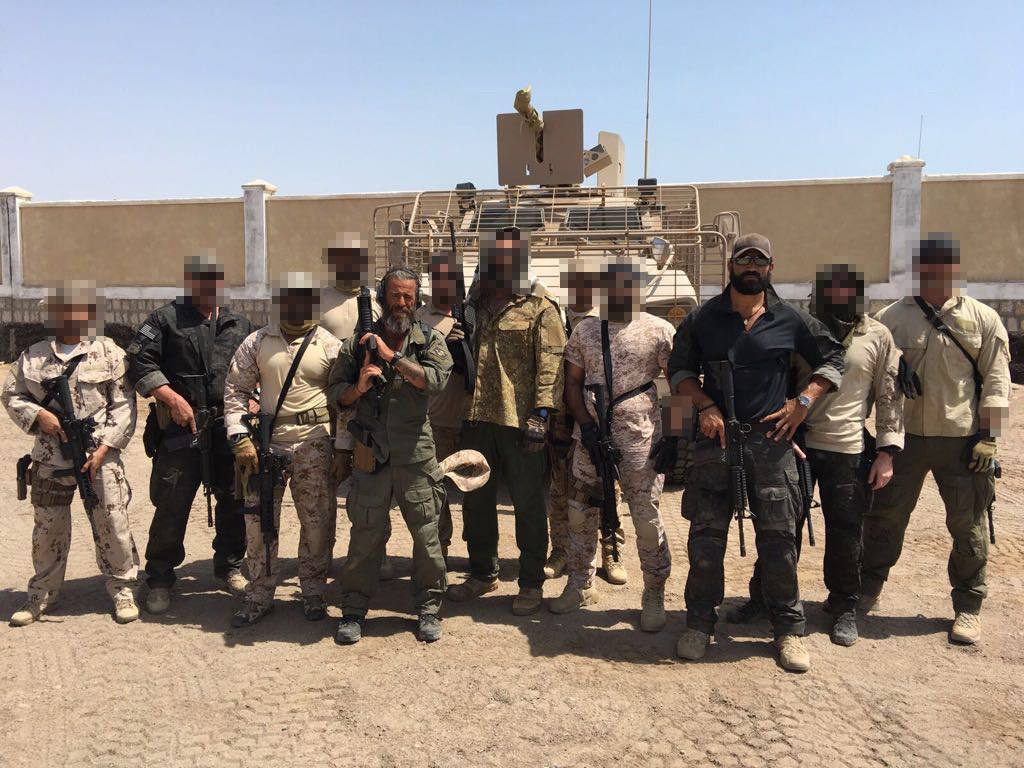
Spear Operations Group members

== Operations and controversial assassination missions ==
One of the first and most publicized missions undertaken by Golan's team was the attempted assassination of Anssaf Ali Mayo, a leader of Al-Islah, in 2015. Although the mission was unsuccessful, it drove the leader out of the country, and marked the beginning of a series of targeted killings that continued over several months, with Spear Operations Group remaining active in Yemen. The UAE supplied Golan's team with equipment, weapons, and Emirati military credentials, embedding them within local Emirati-backed forces. This alignment, blending private contractors with national military assets, blurred lines between sovereign military operations and privatized military interventions.

== Legal and ethical backlash ==
Golan's work in Yemen ignited significant controversy in the United States, as reports emerged suggesting American citizens were involved in potentially illegal assassination missions. U.S. Senators Elizabeth Warren and Bob Menendez called on federal authorities to investigate whether Golan's operations breached the War Crimes Act, which prohibits civilians from conducting military operations on foreign soil. Critics argue that such PMCs lack the accountability of state forces, raising concerns over private military contractors' role in conflicts, potential war crimes, and ethical accountability.

Despite these concerns, Golan has publicly defended his company's actions, claiming they align with counter-terrorism efforts critical to regional stability. He argues that privatized solutions like those provided by Spear Operations Group address security threats effectively, even as international debate around the role and regulation of PMCs persists.

== Global Strategic Group ==
In 2008, Golan was reported to be providing security to energy clients in Africa while based in Geneva, Switzerland. One of his contracts was to protect ships drilling in Nigeria's offshore oil fields from sabotage and terrorism. In September 2008, Africa Energy Intelligence reported that Israeli Knesset member Danny Yatom and Golan had formed Global Strategic Group which would focus on providing security and training for corporations, individuals, and governments, with a focus on the African energy market. The new business, Global Strategic Group, listed a Ramat Gan office tower address where Arcadi Gaydamak also maintained his offices.

== Operations in Serbia ==
Daniel David Corbett, a former DEVGRU operative was held in prison in Serbia for eighteen months while under investigation for possession of an illegal handgun. Corbett was on reserve status at the time with the United States Navy. Abraham Golan traveled to Serbia with Daniel Corbett in early 2018, according to Serbian news reports. Golan declined to discuss the purpose of their visit to Serbia or Corbett's legal case there. In July 2018, Corbett's lawyer was assassinated in Belgrade, in a case that remains unsolved. It is unknown if the lawyer's killing was related to Corbett's case.

Corbett claims he was there to do reconnaissance on a "religious figure". Pro-Russian media speculated that Corbett was there to assassinate Serbian leaders. Some outlets alleged he was behind the unsolved assassination of Oliver Ivanović. Golan also had connections to Arkan, former commander of the Serb Volunteer Guard.

Reports alleged that prior to Corbett's travel to Serbia, Corbett traveled to Chicago, Bosnia, and other former Yugoslavian republics where he studied Serbian culture amongst its diaspora. Former Yugoslav intelligence officer, Božidar Spasić, claims the Clintons had involvement behind the contract awarded to Golan.
