= Joe Adams (mercenary) =

American private investigator and former mercenary

Joe Sam Adams, Jr.
- Born: 1949 or 1950 (age 76–77)
- Military career
- Allegiance: United States of America; Contras
- Branch: United States Marine Corps
- Other work: Mercenary, bodyguard, private investigator

Joe Sam "Tirador" Adams, Jr. is an American private investigator and former mercenary who trained the forces of, and acted as a bodyguard for, Adolfo Calero, one of the leaders of the Contra rebellion in Nicaragua. In 1988, he was indicted for violating the Neutrality Act. He was accused of having done so on behalf of the United States Central Intelligence Agency. Adams, the first person indicted in Iran-Contra, was convicted, sentenced by Judge Norman Roettger to one day of unsupervised probation and a $50 fine, and then pardoned. Adams has been the subject of over 100 newspaper articles. Adams has also been featured in mercenary magazines such as Eagle and Soldier of Fortune.

A former member of the United States Marine Corps, Adams has also worked as a mercenary and security consultant in Southeast Asia, Africa, and Europe. Before becoming involved with the Contras, he provided security for drug dealers in Miami, was involved in trafficking cocaine internationally and eventually became a government informer in drugs and weapons cases.

As of 2012, he operated Adams Investigations in St. Louis, Missouri and had worked numerous high-profile cases there, including the capture of an FBI Top Ten Most-Wanted Fugitive.

Adams is a former bodybuilder and powerlifter who appeared in several of Joe Weider's publications in the 1970s, and appeared in shoots with Arnold Schwarzenegger.

In the 1980s, Adams was the subject of controversy in the St. Louis area when, acting as a bounty hunter, a prisoner in his custody died from the effects of a stun gun.

Adams founded Project Bluelight in 2008, which is described as an "anti-terrorist intelligence operation" that supports homeland security and border patrol agents.

== Hyperlinks ==
- "Meet Colonel Joe S. Adams". The Washington Guard Foundation. Archived from the original on 28 June 2024.
- "Colonel Joe Adams". Project Bluelight Scouts. Archived from the original on 28 June 2024.
