= Luanda Trial =

1976 trial and execution of Western mercenaries in Luanda during the Angolan Civil War

The Luanda Trial was a trial held in Luanda, Angola, in June 1976 during the Angolan Civil War. Fourteen Western mercenaries were sentenced to either long prison terms or execution by firing squad.

== Background ==
Angola had gained its independence from Portugal on 11 November 1975, but the new country was immediately immersed in a three-sided civil war. The Popular Movement for the Liberation of Angola (MPLA) was supported by the Soviet Union and Cuba, while the United States and some of its allies backed the National Liberation Front of Angola (FNLA) and the National Union for the Total Independence of Angola (UNITA).

Fourteen mercenaries fighting for the FNLA – nine British, three American and one Irish – were captured by MPLA forces by mid-February 1976. On 26 May they were indicted by the People's Revolutionary Court in Luanda. The men were charged with acting as mercenaries, war crimes, and crimes against peace.

The MPLA Government invited a group of foreign observers to attend the trial. These included Jack Dromey, a British trade unionist who later became a Labour Party MP, and Stephen Sedley, later a UK High Court judge.

== Trial ==
The trial lasted from 11 to 16 June. There were five judges. The presiding judge was Ernesto Teixeira da Silva, the Attorney General of Angola. The other judges were the Director of Angolan Television, two military officers and a member of the National Council of Women in Angola. Guilty verdicts were a foregone conclusion; before the trial had even begun, Luis de Almeida, the Director of Information and Security, stated that the defendants were guilty and that the only thing that needed to be determined was how much punishment to mete out. The following sentences were passed on 28 June 1976:

Death by firing squad:

- Costas Georgiou (also known as "Colonel Tony Callan"), 24 (Cyprus/UK)
- Andrew Gordon McKenzie, 25 (UK)
- John Derek Barker, 34 (UK)
- Daniel Francis Gearhart, 34 (US)

30 years' imprisonment:

- Michael Douglas Wiseman (UK)
- Kevin John Marchant (UK)
- James George Butler (UK)
- Gustavo Marcelo Grillo, 27 (Argentina/US)

24 years' imprisonment:

- John Lawlor (UK)
- Colin Evans (UK)
- Cecil Martin "Satch" Fortuin (South Africa/UK)

16 years' imprisonment:

- John Nammock (UK)
- Gary Martin Acker, 21 (US)
- Malcolm McIntyre (UK)

Some of the verdicts had been expected, especially regarding Callan; one of his fellow mercenaries described him as "a homicidal maniac, who spent a lot of time killing blacks just for fun". However, Gearhart had arrived in Angola only days before his capture; defense lawyers provided evidence he had never fired a shot, and probably had not even participated in combat. Acker, an ex-Marine, had been shot in the leg and taken prisoner in his very first taste of combat within five days after arriving in the country. British Prime Minister James Callaghan, Queen Elizabeth II, US President Gerald Ford, and US Secretary of State Henry Kissinger requested that Angolan President Agostinho Neto to show mercy to the men. However, Neto refused to intervene.

"Mercenarism, instrument of the aggressive designs of imperialism … a scourge of the African continent and a grave threat to the peace, freedom and independence of the people. It is imperative that the practice of mercenarism be banished once and for all from our planet. It is urgent that all states and peace-loving forces fight it most energetically. We are applying justice in Angola not only in the name of our martyred people but also for the good of the brother peoples of Namibia, Zimbabwe and all the peoples of the world against whom imperialism is already getting ready to prepare new mercenary aggressions."

The four condemned men were executed by MPLA military police on 10 July 1976. According to British former mercenaries Chris Dempster and Dave Tomkins, only McKenzie was killed outright. Callan and Gearhart were killed by coup de grâce, while Barker, who was unscathed but had apparently fainted, was shot after waking up while his 'body' was being removed on a stretcher.

== Aftermath ==
The two remaining Americans, Grillo and Acker, were released in November 1982 in a prisoner exchange worked out by the United States Department of State. The British prisoners were released in February 1984 after negotiation by the British Foreign Office.

== See also ==
- Mercenaries in Angolan Civil War

== Notes ==
=== Bibliography ===
- Burchett, Wilfred and Roebuck, Derek. The Whores of War: Mercenaries Today
- Kennedy, Bruce. Soldiers of misfortune CNN Interactive
- Stockwell, John. In Search of Enemies: A CIA story
  - Cohen Jr., Sylvester, Review of In Search of Enemies: A CIA story, The Journal of Modern African Studies, Vol. 17, No. 2 (June 1979), pp. 342–344
