= Costas Georgiou =

Cypriot-born British mercenary (1951–1976)

- Costas Georgiou on trial in Angola (1976)
- Born: Costas Georgiou; 21 December 1951; British Cyprus
- Died: 10 July 1976 (aged 24); Luanda, Angola
- Other name: Colonel Callan
- Status: Executed by firing squad
- Convictions: Acting as a mercenary War crimes Crimes against peace
- Trial: Luanda Trial
- Penalty: Death

Costas Georgiou (Greek: Κώστας Γεωργίου; 21 December 1951 – 10 July 1976), also known by his alias Colonel Callan, was a Greek Cypriot turned-mercenary who was executed following the Luanda Trial for activities during the Angolan Civil War after being captured by MPLA forces.

He is described by some journalists as an extremely violent leader, sometimes referred to as a “psychopathic killer” because of his brutality toward soldiers and African populations. He is alleged to have killed Allied fighters without provocation, notably by disarming and then massacring a group of FNLA fighters—who were considered allies—within the first 48 hours of his arrival in Angola. According to some accounts, he is alleged to have killed at least 170 Angolans during his military campaign, including unarmed civilians.

== Early life ==
Georgiou was born in Cyprus in 1951, when the island was a British Crown colony. His family moved to London in 1963.

== British military career ==
Georgiou joined the British Army and served, at first with distinction, in 1st Battalion, Parachute Regiment in Northern Ireland. He was credited as one of the unit's best marksmen. Georgiou has been implicated as one of the participants in the Bloody Sunday massacre. During a hearing in 2000, a witness said he had fired 26 shots into the crowd.

Despite later claiming to have been a colonel, Georgiou's highest British Army rank was that of corporal, and he never received officer training. Others state Georgiou was a private soldier.

== Mercenary activity ==
=== Background: Roots of the conflict and Georgiou's recruitment ===
In 1975, Portugal recognised the independence of its former colony of Angola, and acknowledged the Soviet-aligned People's Movement for the Liberation of Angola (MPLA) as the de jure government. The new government sought and received help in the form of Cuban military advisors, combat troops and material to fight against rival factions, which included the US-backed National Liberation Front of Angola (FNLA) and the South African-backed National Union for the Total Independence of Angola (UNITA), which received some US funding but no actual military aid. At the same time, British and American ex-military were recruited by the FNLA through private military companies (PMC; also known as PMIs, for Private Military Industry) in the United Kingdom and United States. Funding was provided by various NATO-member intelligence organisations, including the American CIA and the French SDECE.

By this time, Georgiou was out of the army and working part-time in construction. He had few prospects for more stable and gainful employment, given his dishonourable discharge for his part in robbing a post office. He was dating a Greek Cypriot woman, Rona Angelo. Her cousin was 'Shotgun' Charlie Christodoulou, like Costas an ex-paratrooper of Greek Cypriot extraction, but honourably discharged. An acquaintance, Nick Hall, another dishonourably discharged airborne veteran, took the initiative of putting out an advertisement soliciting mercenary employment for four able-bodied young men. These would be Hall himself, Georgiou, Christodoulou and Costas's old comrade Mick Wainhouse.

The men received a prompt reply from "Dr." Donald Belford, a former British Army medic who had volunteered for a humanitarian aid group in Africa some years before. While there, he had treated several Angolan fighters wounded in the struggle against the Portuguese, earning their friendship and trust. One of his friends was Holden Roberto, leader of the FNLA. After independence, Belford became Roberto's official emissary in the United Kingdom.

=== Georgiou in Angola ===
Georgiou was now using the nom de guerre "Colonel Tony Cullen" – the surname of a former army friend and not, as mistakenly alleged by some journalists, inspired by the TV espionage series Callan. He went to Angola to work as an unpaid medical orderly, in advance of his three colleagues. It was while he was working in this position that he took part in the decisive action that brought him to the notice of the FNLA leadership. When FNLA soldiers fled the advance of a MPLA force, which threatened to capture the hospital to which he was assigned, Georgiou, and longtime Irish colleague Lyndon Sheehan, led a handful of Portuguese FNLA soldiers in an offensive defence, stopping the MPLA force in its tracks. The general trend of the war for the FNLA at that time was one of a steady string of defeats, ensuring that the defeat of the MPLA column attracted immediate attention from Holden Roberto who, to Georgiou's surprise, appointed him head of the FNLA army, with the rank of Colonel (still unpaid). His three friends including Charlie Christodoulou arrived from Britain shortly afterwards. Within 48 hours of his arrival in Angola, Georgiou had already led his men in disarming and massacring a group of FNLA fighters (his supposed allies), whom he killed just for the "fun" of it all.

Thanks to continuing recruitment in England, a somewhat larger mercenary contingent was formed, but a full battalion was never realised. The enlarged force was still rather small relative to MPLA/Cuban forces, and many of the men were civilians with no military experience, and often refusing to submit to military discipline. This, combined with the foreign origin of most of the core leadership, (Georgiou, Christodoulou and the Portuguese), created a deep gulf between the officers and the British other ranks – to say nothing of the native Angolans recruited as infantry and support troops. Most of these had no military experience and many knew no English, or even Portuguese (then still the language of government and the native elite.)

The first contingent of mercenaries was mostly made up of professional soldiers, selected by a British private military company (PMC), Security Advisory Services (SAS), run by John Banks, Chris Dempster, and Dave Tomkins. Georgiou resented SAS's own leadership structure within the group, and perceived John Banks, who remained based in Britain, as a personal threat to his own position when Banks did visit Angola. Georgiou became increasingly paranoid and belligerent toward his own men, murdering African soldiers and creating a climate of fear even among the British mercenaries, none of which aided the morale of the FNLA forces or their ability to wage war successfully against the MPLA. The British journalist Patrick Brogan called Georgiou a "psychopathic killer" who executed 14 of his fellow mercenaries for cowardice, and was extremely brutal to black people. By all accounts, Georgiou killed for pleasure, and at his later trial, it was established that he had killed at least 170 Angolans. Georgiou was much hated and feared by the men under his command, and by the FNLA who regarded him as a loose cannon who was just as likely to attack them as he was the MPLA.

The second contingent of mercenaries sent from Britain, unlike the first, was made up mostly of working-class men with no military experience. Within a week of their arrival, about a dozen of the second contingent had accidentally maimed themselves by trying to use weapons that they did not fully understand. These undisciplined men quickly realised the perilous situation into which they had been placed, and the instability of their leadership. A group of them consequently seized vehicles and attempted to flee the country, firing on other FNLA forces in the process, including Chris Dempster. The deserters were quickly rounded up by Georgiou's men, and fourteen were summarily executed by firing squad.

A third contingent of similarly inept mercenaries was recruited in the US by an American PMC.

The "battalion" fought several more dramatic engagements, including successful ambushes of minor MPLA detachments. However, given his limited resources and the fact that many of his men – European and native alike – were untrained, increasingly demoralised amateurs, Georgiou's campaign was ultimately a failure. According to mercenary David Tomkins, the group spent most of its time foraging for food, usable weapons, and ammunition. Much of this foraging consisted of "raids" on villages, where the men would casually walk into town brandishing their weapons, searching for anything of use. Anyone who offered physical resistance would be shot.

Lack of proper equipment was one of the key factors in the failure of foreign mercenary units in Angola generally, and in Georgiou's case in particular. The MPLA had Soviet tanks, artillery and crack Cuban troops fighting as their allies. The other two factions had mostly light infantry, not always the best trained and disciplined either. Another factor was leadership inexperience: Georgiou had absolutely no training or experience as a commissioned officer, nor did most of his counterparts in other units. Cuban accounts of the Angolan war speak of the mercenaries in a contemptuous tone. The majority of Cuban veterans of Angola describe the mercenaries they fought as inept soldiers whom they had no difficulty defeating.

== Trial and execution ==
Georgiou was tried under the jurisdiction of the Angolan MPLA government in the Luanda Trial during June and July 1976. He was charged with illegally entering Angola as a mercenary, along with twelve other defendants. In addition he was charged with involvement in the massacre of fourteen fellow mercenaries at Maquela do Zombo in northern Angola, as well as with the murder and torture of enemy soldiers and civilians in the town of São Salvador. The killings at Maquela occurred after some mercenary recruits had mistakenly opened fire on their colleagues and, fearing retribution by Georgiou and the MPLA, had subsequently fled towards Zaire, taking all the unit's supplies.

Georgiou was convicted and sentenced to death. President Agostinho Neto rejected pleas for mercy from Queen Elizabeth II on behalf of Georgiou and three other condemned British mercenaries. Georgiou was executed by firing squad on 10 July 1976. His sister, Panayiota 'Blondie' Georgiades, was allowed to visit him during his captivity in Angola. In a BBC interview, she said they spoke mainly about their family and the trial proceedings, conversing in Greek. Georgiou's body was repatriated to England, and he was buried secretly in a cemetery in north London in accordance with the rites of the Greek Orthodox Church.
