= Charlie Christodoulou =

British mercenary killed in Angola

Charles Christodoulou
- Front page of the Daily Mirror - 11 February 1976
- Born: c. 1951; Birmingham, England
- Died: February 14, 1976 (aged 24–25); Angola
- Cause of death: Killed in action
- Other name: Shotgun Charlie
- UK military career
- Allegiance: United Kingdom
- Branch: British Army
- Rank: Corporal
- Unit: 1st Battalion of the Parachute Regiment
- Mercenary
- Allegiance: FNLA
- Rank: Captain

Charles Christodoulou (c.1951 – 14 February 1976) was a British soldier in the Parachute Regiment who later served as a foreign mercenary during the Angolan War of Independence of the 1970s. Known as 'Shotgun Charlie', he was involved in the murder of at least 167 people during that conflict.

== Early life and career ==
Christodoulou was born in Birmingham in the United Kingdom of Greek Cypriot parents and was believed to be a cousin of Costas Georgiou, known later as 'Colonel Callan', the leader of the British mercenaries in Angola. The two served together in the 1st Battalion of the Parachute Regiment in the British Army and toured in Northern Ireland. Georgiou was going out with Rona Angelo, Christodoulou's cousin. Unlike his fellow mercenaries Georgiou and Mick Wainwright, Christodoulou had been honourably discharged from the Army with the rank of Corporal, where he was referred to as "Charlie Caldwell" or "Charlie Kebab". In Angola he was known as "Shotgun Charlie", because he was never seen without a Spanish-made shotgun, which became his weapon of choice.

== Mercenary in Angola ==
In 1975, Christodoulou was recruited in the Aldershot area by Nick Hall as a mercenary for the Angola War along with Georgiou and Michael Wainwright.

Described as a "withdrawn and easily led character", Christodoulou fought with the rank of Captain in Angola in 1976 for the FNLA. A ruthless and sadistic man disliked by all except Georgiou, his best friend, Christodoulou was one of the first three British mercenaries to land in Angola after Georgiou, arriving with his close friends Nick Hall and Michael Wainwright.

Thanks to continuing recruitment in England, a somewhat larger mercenary contingent was formed, with the first contingent of mercenaries to arrive in Angola being mostly made up of professional soldiers. However, a full battalion was never realised. The enlarged force was still rather small relative to MPLA/Cuban forces, and many of the men were civilians with no military experience, and often refused to submit to military discipline. This, combined with the foreign, Mediterranean origin of most of the core leadership, (Georgiou, Christodoulou and the Portuguese — although Christodoulou spoke with a Birmingham accent), created a deep gulf between the officers and the British other ranks – to say nothing of the native Angolans recruited as infantry and support troops. Most of these had no military experience and many knew no English, or even Portuguese (then still the language of government and the native elite.)

When the FNLA soldiers at Quiende barracks semi-mutinied, Callan's now larger military force moved on their barracks where Callan and Christodoulou personally executed 20 of the ringleaders. Christodoulou would later boast to his friend Chris Dempster that he and Georgiou and their team had killed 167.5 FNLA mutineers and deserters. When Dempster asked, 'Why point five?' Christodoulou replied, 'One of the prisoners brought for execution at Quiende Bridge the other night had a lucky escape. He was bound hand and foot and had a pistol put to his head. But the weapon didn't fire. The gun was re-cocked but it jammed again. The poor bastard was terrified. He jumped off the bridge. We sprayed bullets into the water but since it was unconfirmed whether he was hit, and just in case he could swim with his hands and feet tied, we decided it was only fair to classify him as "half dead"'.

After 14 British recruits were murdered by firing squad by Callan and his force for desertion, Holden Roberto decided he should be dismissed from his command and court-martialled. Roberto and five mercenaries flew to Maquela to carry out this mission where they were met at the airport by Christodoulou, shotgun in hand. He was disarmed with riflebutt blows to the face while shouting, "I wasn't even effing there!" At a drumhead court-martial, Christodoulou was acquitted of mass murder but found guilty of 'unmilitary behaviour', stripped of his rank and sentenced to serve six months at the front without pay. His colleague Sammy Copeland was found guilty and sentenced to immediate execution by firing squad. To some present, Christodoulou's lenient sentence seemed ludicrous considering the number of atrocities he was guilty of in Angola, and one mercenary named Peter McAleese argued unsuccessfully with Roberto to reverse the sentences and execute Christodoulou as a warning to others. Roberto confirmed the original verdicts and sentences. However, British mercenary Andrew Black on his return to the United Kingdom made the unverified claim that all 14 murders were the work of "the cold-blooded killer" Christodoulou alone.

== Death ==
On 14 February 1976 Christodoulou heard reports that the enemy were 40 miles away and went with two British and two American mercenaries in a Land Rover to investigate. Christodoulou was killed instantly by heavy automatic fire in an ambush, along with five other mercenaries.

Christodoulou was involved in the murder of at least 167 members of the FNLA. His General Service Medal with bar for Northern Ireland is in a private collection.
