= Peter McAleese =

Scottish former SAS soldier and mercenary (1942–2024)

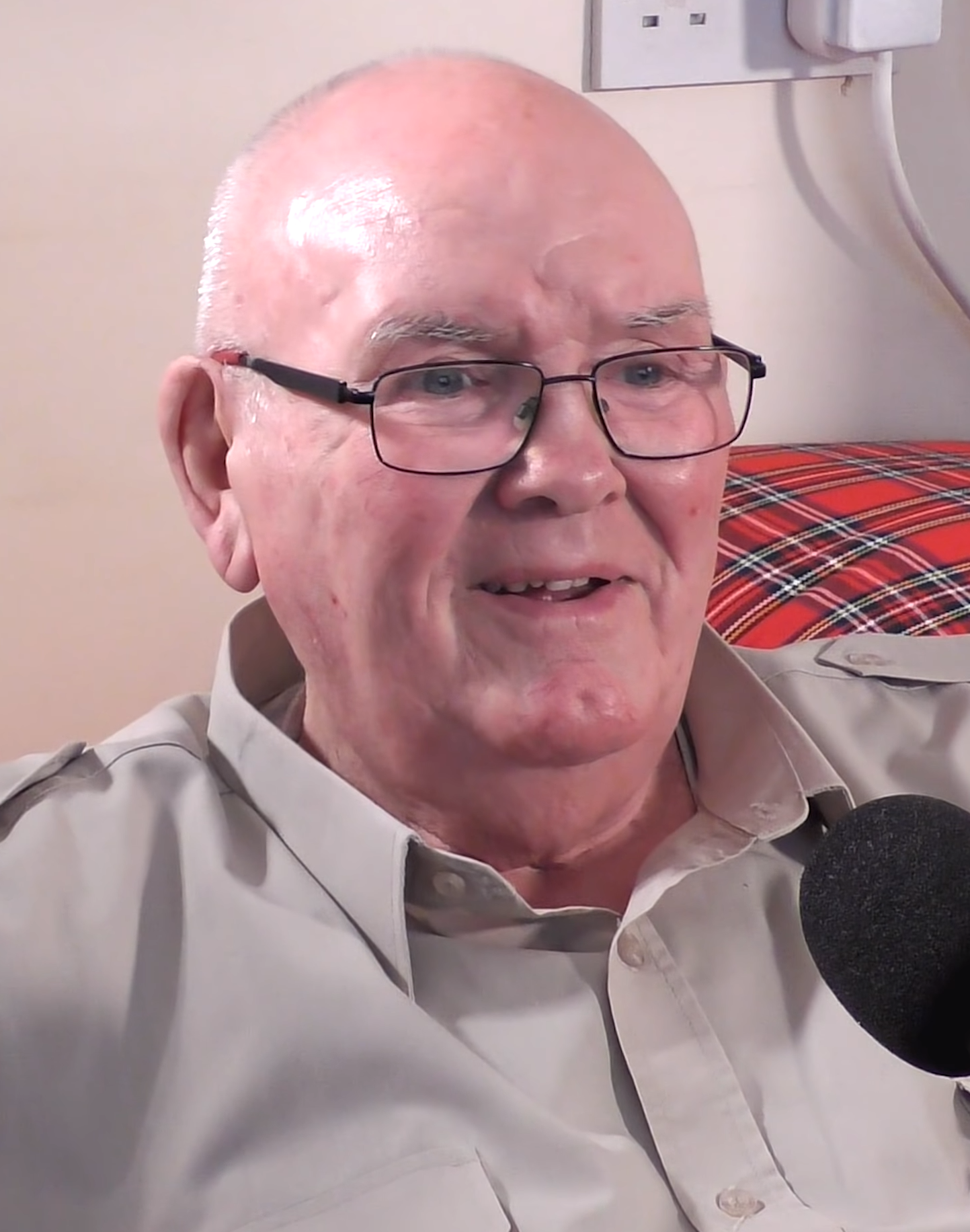
- McAleese in 2021
- Born: 7 September 1942; Glasgow, Scotland
- Died: 18 March 2024 (aged 81)
- Military career
- Allegiance: British Army; Security Advisory Services; National Liberation Front of Angola; Rhodesian Security Forces; South African Defence Force; Keenie Meenie Services; Cali Cartel
- Service years: 1960 to 1969 (soldier); 1976 to 1977 (mercenary); 1977 to mid-1980s (soldier) mid-1980s to mid-1990s (mercenary)
- Rank: Staff Sergeant (British Army); Sergeant (Rhodesian Security Forces); Company Sergeant Major (South African Defence Force)
- Service number: 80021355 (South African Defence Force)
- Units: Parachute Regiment; Special Air Service; Rhodesian Special Air Service; British South Africa Police; 44 Parachute Brigade; 32 Battalion
- Conflicts: Indonesia-Malaysia confrontation Aden Emergency; Angolan Civil War; Rhodesian Bush War; South African Border War; Colombian conflict
- Website: www.petermcaleese.com

Peter McAleese (7 September 1942 – 18 March 2024) was a Scottish former special forces soldier and mercenary who attempted to assassinate Pablo Escobar in the late 1980s.

McAleese fought in several Cold War conflicts while serving with elite units such as the British Army's Parachute Regiment and Special Air Service, the Rhodesian Special Air Service and the Selous Scouts branch of the British South Africa Police, and South Africa's 44 Parachute Brigade and 32 Battalion. As a mercenary or private military contractor, he worked in countries including Apartheid South Africa, Angola, Uganda, Colombia, Russia, Algeria and Iraq.

McAleese was the author of the book No Mean Soldier and the subject of the 2021 UK documentary film Killing Escobar.

== Early life ==
McAleese was born into a Roman Catholic family of Irish descent in Glasgow, Scotland, within sight of Barlinnie Prison, and spent his childhood years in the city's Riddrie district. Growing up he was often beaten by his father, who had served in the military and had a reputation for being an aggressive fighting man. McAleese was expelled from St Roch's Secondary School for fighting other students aged 13.

== Military career ==
=== British Army ===
McAleese first became fascinated with paratroopers after watching "The Red Beret" at his local cinema, and after first working as a plasterer enlisted with the British Army's Parachute Regiment in Aberdeen in March 1960 soon after he turned 17 years old. On completion of basic training at the Parachute Regiment's Aldershot depot, he was assigned to the 1st Battalion, Parachute Regiment's mortar platoon. After hearing accounts of British commando operations during the Malayan Emergency, in January 1962 McAleese applied to volunteer for the Special Air Service, and after passing selection was assigned to 'D' Squadron then served with its Mobility troop in Aden Protectorate. McAleese was returned to unit from the SAS for disciplinary reasons after getting into a fight with a member of American Special Forces while undergoing HALO training at Fort Bragg. McAleese thereafter re-joined 1 Para, where he was posted to Bahrain in December 1962 as a standby unit incase Qasim's Republic of Iraq launched an attack on Kuwait. McAleese also took part in the United Nations Peacekeeping Force in Cyprus while in 1 Para.

After being promoted to corporal, McAleese re-joined the SAS in 1964 and served with 'D' Squadron's 16 (Air) Troop during the Indonesia-Malaysia confrontation, where from a base in Kuching he led excursions behind enemy lines to mount ambushes on Indonesian military patrols. McAleese also saw action during the Aden Emergency with the SAS. In 1967 he was again returned to the Parachute Regiment for disciplinary offences related to violent disorder involving a French paratrooper. After attending the Infantry Battle School and being awarded a rare "A" grade on completion of the Senior NCO's tactics course, McAleese was promoted to Staff sergeant and invited back to become a small arms instructor at the Infantry Battle School. In March 1969, McAleese resigned from the British Army after being told "off the record" by a senior officer that due to his poor disciplinary record he would never be promoted any further than his current rank.

=== Angola mercenary ===
McAleese first worked on oil rigs in the North Sea after leaving the British military, however he then served three prison sentences in the early 1970s following convictions for violence and was incarcerated at HMP Gloucester. On his third release from prison in 1976, McAleese left the United Kingdom for Africa, where he was a mercenary soldier for Security Advisory Services in the Angolan Civil War for several months, fighting alongside the National Liberation Front of Angola and assuming command of the formation after the capture of Costas Georgiou. McAleese later took part in the court-martial of fellow mercenaries Sammy Copeland and Charlie Christodoulou for their involvement in the mass murder of 14 British recruits for "cowardice", which resulted in Copeland being found guilty and executed by firing squad. After realising the war was unwinnable and witnessing the breakdown in discipline amongst his local allies, McAleese soon returned to England to again work on the oil rigs.

=== Rhodesian Security Forces ===
After a chance meeting in Hereford with Chuck Hinds, who was a former SAS colleague who had since moved to Rhodesia, in December 1976 McAleese flew to Salisbury and promptly enlisted in the Rhodesian Security Forces. Due to his specialist skills and previous special forces experience, McAleese volunteered for the Rhodesian Special Air Service, and after passing selection was assigned to its 'A' Troop of "C" Squadron, eventually being promoted to the rank of sergeant. The unit was at the forefront of fighting in the Rhodesian Bush War, and McAleese took part in many cross border raids into Mozambique to combat ZANLA rebels.

During Operation Dingo, McAleese and his unit were parachuted into the outskirts of the ZANLA's headquarters at Chimoio farm complex to set up ambushes for militants fleeing the initial airstrikes, before advancing towards the complex to sweep for high value prisoners and enemy intelligence documents. As darkness fell, they then withdrew to again set up ambushes to kill any returning ZANLA personnel, before being extracted by Alouette helicopter during the night. During the battle, McAleese was armed with a Soviet-issue RPK machine gun so as to replenish his ammunition with AK-47 magazines recovered from fallen ZANLA, and estimated that almost 700 rebels were killed in the operation. McAleese then took part in a similar operation a few days later at a ZANLA camp in Tembue, where his unit destroyed several ammunition dumps in addition to killing hundreds of militants.

In 1979, McAleese joined the Special Branch of British South Africa Police, where his main duty was to train "pseudo gangs" for the Selous Scouts.

=== South African Defence Forces ===
After the fall of Rhodesia, in June 1980 McAleese resigned from the Rhodesian Security Forces and moved to South Africa, where he enlisted with the South African Defence Force's 44 Parachute Brigade and served as a Company Sergeant Major until 1984. He was tasked with the foundation of a new pathfinder reconnaissance unit for deployment in the South African Border War, and created a course similar to SAS selection at a camp in the Makuleke region. McAleese was recommended for the Honoris Crux due to his actions during a battle in Namibia shortly after the unit's formation. Due to operational requirements, McAleese's pathfinder company was eventually amalgamated with the reconnaissance platoon of the elite 32 Battalion, and soon took part in a major combined arms attack during Operation Daisy. One of McAleese's last operations with the unit was a cross-border search and destroy mission into Evale. However, instead of finding a few dozen lightly armed SWAPO guerrillas the SADF encountered fierce resistance by over 300 SWAPO fighters, who were led by East German military advisors and armed with 82mm mortars, heavy machine guns and shoulder launched surface-to-air missiles.

=== Freelance mercenary ===
After completing his contract with the SADF, McAleese set up a family home in Pretoria and became a director of the COIN Security Group, which was a military/police private contractor providing security to local installations against political unrest. In October 1984, McAleese was seriously injured after a near-death parachuting display accident and was confined to a wheelchair for the next 2 years. After becoming increasingly disillusioned with life in Apartheid South Africa, such as an incident where he overheard his 4-year-old son using the racial slur "kaffir", McAleese moved his wife and children back to live in the United Kingdom.

He then accepted a 1 year contract with Keenie Meenie Services to provide armed protection for E.E.C diplomatic staff in Uganda. McAleese finally left Africa for good in 1987 and then worked as the pub landlord of the Gunmakers Arms in Birmingham city centre. At the end of the 1980s, he spent two years as a security contractor during the "Colombian conflict". In the mid-1990s he worked in Moscow as a bodyguard training instructor, and undertook security work in Algeria and Iraq for several years.

== Colombian missions ==
In July 1988, McAleese was approached by fellow British mercenary and former Angolan Civil War colleague David Tomkins regarding a mission to destroy the La Uribe jungle ‘Casa Verde’ headquarters of FARC on behalf of Colombian drug lord José Gonzalo Rodríguez Gacha. The men recruited 16 other mercenaries, including two former SAS members who took part in the operation to end the 1980 Iranian Embassy siege, and travelled to Colombia to a staging area near Puerto Boyacá. However, the attack was later called off in November 1988 after the team's weapons failed to arrive on time. The mercenaries then left Colombia and McAleese returned to the UK, where he continued to search for work in the private security industry. One of the mercenaries, former Rhodesian Light Infantry corporal Terry Tangney, later sold his story to NBC News and shared video footage of the team providing small unit tactics training to Medellín Cartel members, as well as McAleese showing how to place grenade booby traps around secret cocaine processing labs in the Nariño Department jungle.

In early 1989, McAleese and Tomkins were contracted by the Cali Cartel to assassinate their rival, Pablo Escobar. McAleese and 12 of his original team of British Commonwealth mercenaries travelled to Colombia and set up camp in a jungle clearing in Valle del Cauca, which was 3 hours helicopter flight away from Escobar's heavily defended mansion at Hacienda Nápoles. Intelligence suggested Escobar had approximately 60 bodyguards on site, who were lightly armed with a mixture of Uzi and MAC-11 machine pistols. During training the regular mercenaries were paid US$5,000 a month plus expenses, while McAleese and Tomkins received US$1,000 per day, with the promise of a USD$1 million bonus if they successfully assassinated Escobar. For internal security reasons only McAleese and Tomkins knew that Escobar was the ultimate target of the mission.

Mercenaries hired by McAleese and Tomkin training in the Columbian jungle in 1989 for an attempt to assassinate Pablo Escobar

The mercenaries built a mock up of Escobar's estate and practiced for 11 weeks the drills needed to assault it by helicopter. The team would disguise themselves as Colombian security forces as a ruse of war to have the element of surprise during the attack, where each man was to be armed with a Colt Commando rifle along with hand grenades. The team's plan was to fly in three helicopters re-painted in Colombian Air Force colors low over the jungle to avoid radar, then with one remaining in the air to throw satchel charges and provide fire support with a M60 machine gun the other two would drop the main assault team on a soccer pitch on the eastern end of the compound. The mercenaries, who would be dressed in Colombian military 'Tigrillo' camouflage uniforms and have yellow crosses sprayed on the top of their balaclavas for identification from the air, would then fire and maneuver in pairs through the mansion until they located Escobar, and after killing him they would cut off his head and take it with them as proof of his death.

However on 4 June 1989, while on route to carry out the attack, bad weather caused the pilot of McAleese's Hughes 500 helicopter to crash into a mountainside of the Central Colombian Andes due to poor visibility. After the crash, McAleese suffered broken ribs and had to lay on the mountain they crashed on for 3 days before getting rescued. The rest of the team aborted the mission once contact was lost with McAleese's helicopter and flew back to Valle del Cauca, where McAleese also returned after hospital treatment in Cali. Although McAleese wanted to launch a second attempt after a couple of weeks of rehearsals, increased Colombian security forces activity resulting from the murder of Luis Carlos Galán during a political rally caused Cali Cartel to cancel the contract, and McAleese then returned to England.

In late August 1989, McAleese and Tomkins (along with former Israeli 35th Paratroopers Brigade lieutenant colonel Yair Klein) were named by the Colombian secret police as part of a group of foreign mercenaries who were in-country working illegally with Colombian drug traffickers, adding that the authorities were liaising with both Interpol and the British government in order to locate and detain the men. McAleese later claimed that after he returned to the UK, a pair of what he assumed to be MI6 agents approached him at his pub to warn him off from launching any further attempts at assassinating Escobar.

The failed mission was the subject of the 2021 UK documentary film Killing Escobar. Filmed interviews with McAleese and some of his colleagues form the core of the narrative.

== Retirement and death ==
Peter with his book, No Mean Soldier in 2022.

In 1993, McAleese published his memoir, entitled No Mean Soldier, which has been reprinted several times.

In an effort to make amends for previous bad behaviour, McAleese gave up alcohol in 2013 and became a devout Catholic. McAleese died in Birmingham, England, on 18 March 2024, at the age of 81.

== Publications ==
- McAleese, Peter & Avery, John (1999). McAleese's Fighting Manual. Orion. ISBN 0-7528-0063-9.
- McAleese, Peter (2000). No Mean Soldier. Cassell Military. ISBN 0-304-35684-0.
- McAleese, Peter (2015). Beyond No Mean Soldier (an updated and more detailed revision of No Mean Soldier). Helion & Co., Ltd. ISBN 978-1-910294-01-7.
- McAleese, Peter (2022). Killing Escobar. Gadfly Press.
