= John Banks (mercenary recruiter) =

British Army soldier and mercenary recruiter (born 1945)

- Born: John Edward Banks; 1945 (age 80–81); Aldershot, Hampshire, England
- Military career
- Allegiance: United Kingdom
- Branch: British Army
- Service years: 1962–1969
- Rank: Major (claimed), Private (actual)
- Nickname: "The Angola recruiter"
- Unit: Parachute Regiment (United Kingdom)
- Conflicts: Aden Emergency; Indonesia–Malaysia confrontation; Dhofar Rebellion

John Edward Banks (born 1945) is a British former soldier, mercenary recruiter, and the founder of the Security Advisory Services.

== Early life ==
John Banks was born in Aldershot in 1945 into the family of an Army Medical Corps officer serving in the Airborne Forces. John spent his childhood years in Camberley not far away from the Royal Military Academy Sandhurst. As a child he attended service schools in Egypt and Cyprus. His military career started in 1962 when he was only 17 years old. After his initial training Banks served in the "Pathfinder" unit of the Second Battalion of the Parachute Regiment. In four years, he was transferred to the Second Battalion’s Special Patrol Company, a unit trained to penetrate behind the enemy lines. Banks took part in the hostilities in Malaysia, Yemen and Oman. Due to injuries received in combat he could no longer continue his active service and began to work as an unarmed combat instructor at the Parachute Regiment Battle School in Wales.

== Secret military operations ==
After being discharged from the British Army in 1969, John Banks joined the United States Army Special Forces, according to his own claims, but soon had to leave it too due to the involvement of his brother Roger in arms trade with Viet Cong. In 1970 Banks got acquainted to David Stirling, the founder of the Special Air Service and started to work for the Stirling's PMC Watchguard International. Banks claimed Stirling hired him for the "Hilton Assignment", a secret military operation aimed at overthrowing Colonel Gaddafi by inciting an uprising in the prison of Tripoli. But the assignment was canceled under the pressure exerted by British and American diplomats. John Banks participated in a number of military operations in Biafra, South Vietnam and Iraq as a mercenary.

== Private military companies ==
In 1975 John Banks co-founded a private military company Security Advisory Services. While running the company's office in Sandhurst, Banks engaged in recruiting mercenaries for the war in Southern Rhodesia and Angolan Civil War. Some of the recruited mercenaries who fought for the National Liberation Front of Angola were captured and sentenced to death during the Luanda Trial. Banks did not appear to have any sympathy for their fate and said to the BBC reporters in Britain:

I don't feel sorry for them. They are soldiers, they knew what they were doing. I would do it again.

In spite of leaving Security Advisory Services in 1976, John Banks kept recruiting mercenaries for the Angolan National Front. Later on, he founded the Anti-Communist Revolutionary Organization to send mercenaries to fight the Cuban army in Jamaica.

During an IRA arms procurement trial in 1977, Banks gave testimony which revealed strong ties of his former company with ex-SAS servicemen and with the British PMC Keenie Meenie Services as well.

In 1978 John Banks published the book The Wages of War: the Life of a Modern Mercenary, summarizing his mercenary experience.

== Prison ==
In 1980 Banks was convicted of extorting 250 thousand dollars from the Nicaragua embassy in London in exchange for the information about an attempt upon the life of the former president Somoza. Banks claimed at the Central Criminal Court that he was one of the six British and American mercenaries hired by the CIA to assassinate Somoza by order of the US President Carter. But the mercenaries did not want to kill Somoza and chose John Banks to disclose the assassination plan, according to his allegations. Banks denied the extortion charges. After his escape from the Coldingley prison, John Banks was captured and imprisoned again in the end of 1981. According to the Scottish anarchist Stuart Christie, in 1982 John Banks was already at large and worked as a security advisor for Muammar Gaddafi.

== Later life ==
At the beginning of 1990s John Banks allegedly took part in an undercover operation staged by Customs and Excise officers to arrest a drug smuggler from Ghana. Banks worked for the Special Branch and then for SO15. He also worked for the Scorpions, a unit of the National Prosecuting Authority of South Africa, which was in fact an intelligence unit, according to Banks. In his interview with Sean Stone in December 2014, Banks claimed that US intelligence services planned a bombing during the 2010 FIFA World Cup.
