= Chipinge District =

District in Zimbabwe

Chipinge
- District
- Chipinge District within Zimbabwe
- Country: Zimbabwe
- Province: Manicaland
- District: Chipinge

Area
  - District: 5,220 km^{2} (2,020 sq mi)

Population (2012)
  - District: 234,133
  - Density: 57.24/km^{2} (148.3/sq mi)
  - Urban: 25,292
- Time zone: UTC+2 (CET)

Chipinge District is a district in Manicaland Province of eastern Zimbabwe. The administrative headquarters is Chipinge.

== Geography ==
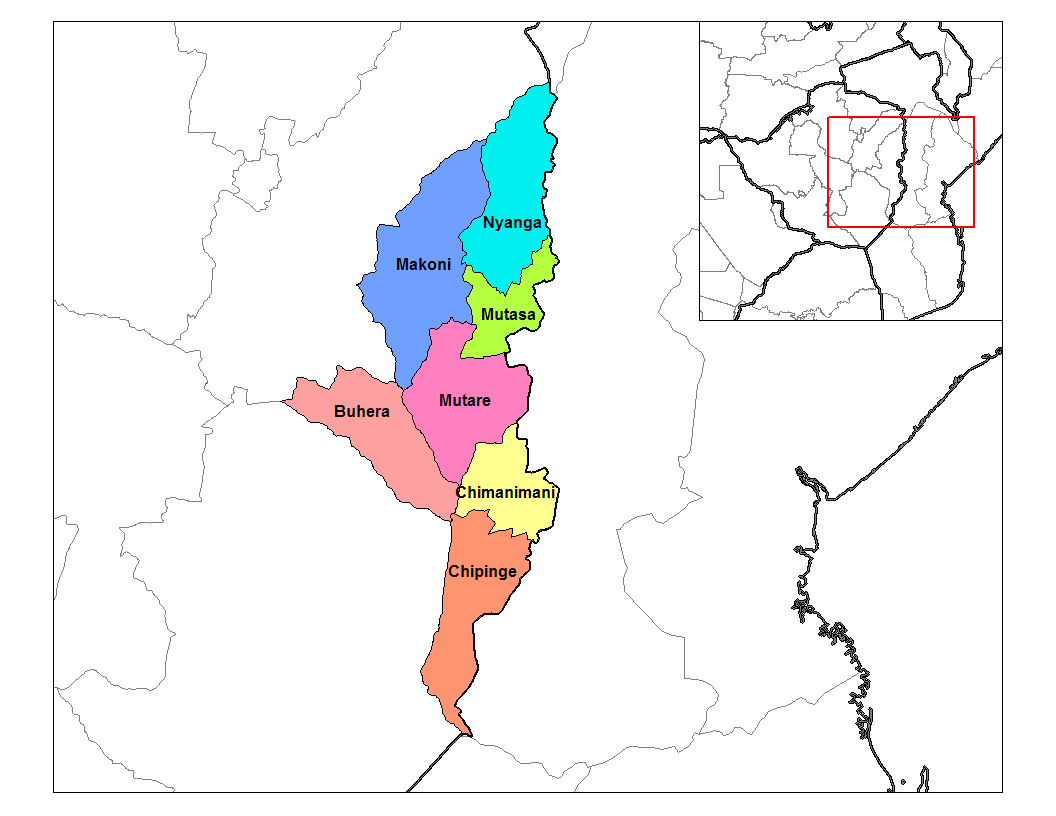
Map of the districts in Manicaland Province

Chipinge District is the southernmost district in Manicaland province. It is bounded on the north by Chimanimani District, on the west by Masvingo Province, and on the east by Mozambique.

The Save River forms the western boundary of the District, and drains the western and southern portions of district. The northeastern portion of the district is drained by the Buzi River and its headwater tributaries.

The southern end of the Eastern Highlands reach into the northern portion of the district. Mount Selinda (1,230 meters) lies near the Mozambican border.

=== Townships and villages ===
- Craigmore
- Chibuwe
- Chipinge
- Chisumbanje
- Checheche
- Junction Gate
- Mkasa
- Rupisi

== People ==
The rural portion of Chipinge District has a population of 324,133. The rural population is 298,841, and the urban population, which consists of Chipinge town, is 25,292 (2012 census).

Ndau people, a sub group of the Shona people, inhabit the north and central portions of the district. Tswa people live in the south.

== Transport ==
The A10 road runs through the district, running southwards from Chimanimani District, then jogging west to the Save River. Here it meets the A16 road, which runs south along the Save from Birchenough Bridge. From the A16 junction the A10 follows the Save southwards, crossing westwards over the Save River at Rupangwana via the Jack Quinton Bridge.

Where the A10 turns west, a road branches south to Chipinge, and continues southeast to cross the Mozambican border between Mount Selinda and Espungabera in Mozambique.

Chipinge Airport is near the town of Chipinge.

== Administration ==
The District has 31 rural administrative wards, and eight urban wards in Chipinge town.

The district is divided into five Assembly parliamentary constituencies: Chipinge Central, Chipinge East, Chipinge South, Chipinge West, and Musikavanhu. The district is a single Senate constituency.

== Ecology ==
Miombo woodland is the predominant vegetation in the northern, central, and northeastern portions of the district.

Mopane woodland occurs in the Save River lowlands in the west and south of the district.

Pockets of mid-elevation evergreen forest occur on a few eastward-facing mountain slopes in the district, where the mountains create orographic precipitation from winds coming from the Indian Ocean.

=== Protected areas ===
Chipinge Safari Area (261 km^{2}) is located in the highlands west of Chipinge, overlooking the Save River Valley. It includes both miombo and mopane woodland.

Chirinda Forest Botanical Reserve protects an enclave of evergreen forest on the slopes of Mount Selinda.
