= Craigmore, Zimbabwe =

Village in Manicaland Province, Zimbabwe

Coordinates: 20°26′S 32°29′E

Craigmore, also known as Chikore Mission, is a village in Chipinge District of Manicaland Province, Zimbabwe located about 30 km south west of Chipinge.
