= Mathew Charles Lamb =

Canadian spree killer (1948–1976)

- Lamb in the Rhodesian Light Infantry, 1974
- Born: 5 January 1948; Windsor, Ontario, Canada
- Died: 7 November 1976 (aged 28); Mutema Tribal Trust Lands, Manicaland, Rhodesia
- Cause of death: Killed in action
- Known for: Acquittal of capital murder because of insanity in 1967, thus avoiding Canada's mandatory death penalty
- Criminal charge: Capital murder
- Criminal penalty: Found not guilty by reason of insanity and committed to indefinite psychiatric care. Released in 1973
- Military career
- Allegiance: Rhodesia
- Branch: Rhodesian Army
- Years of service: 1973–1976
- Rank: Lance corporal
- Service number: 726724
- Units: Rhodesian Light Infantry; Rhodesian SAS
- Wars: Rhodesian Bush War †

Mathew Charles "Matt" Lamb (5 January 1948 – 7 November 1976) was a Canadian spree killer who, in 1967, avoided Canada's then-mandatory death penalty for capital murder by being found not guilty by reason of insanity. Abandoned by his teenage mother soon after his birth in Windsor, Ontario, Lamb had an abusive upbringing at the hands of his step-grandfather, leading him to become emotionally detached from his relatives and peers. He developed violent tendencies that manifested themselves in his physical assault of a police officer at the age of 16 in February 1964, and his engaging in a brief shoot-out with law enforcement ten months later. After this latter incident he spent 14 months, starting in April 1965, at Kingston Penitentiary, a maximum security prison in eastern Ontario.

Seventeen days after his release from jail in June 1966, Lamb took a shotgun from his uncle's house and went on a shooting spree around his East Windsor neighbourhood, killing two strangers and wounding two others. He was charged with capital murder, which under the era's Criminal Code called for a mandatory death penalty, but he avoided this fate when the court found, in January 1967, that he had not been sane at the time of the incident. He was committed for an indefinite time in a psychiatric unit. Over the course of six years in care at Penetanguishene Mental Health Centre's Oak Ridge facility he displayed a profound recovery, prompting an independent five-man committee to recommend to the Executive Council of Ontario that he be released, saying that he was no longer a danger to society. The Council approved Lamb's release in early 1973 on the condition that he spend a year living and working under the supervision of one of Oak Ridge's top psychiatrists, Elliot Barker.

Lamb continued to show improvement, becoming a productive labourer on Barker's farm and earning the trust of the doctor's family. With Barker's encouragement, Lamb joined the Rhodesian Army in late 1973 and fought for the unrecognized government of Rhodesia (modern-day Zimbabwe) for the rest of his life. He started his service in the Rhodesian Light Infantry, and won a place in the crack Special Air Service unit in 1975, but was granted a transfer back to his former regiment a year later. Soon after he was promoted to lance-corporal, Lamb was killed in action on 7 November 1976 by friendly fire from one of his allies. He received what Newsweek called "a hero's funeral" in the Rhodesian capital, Salisbury, before his ashes were returned to Windsor and buried by his relatives.

== Early life ==
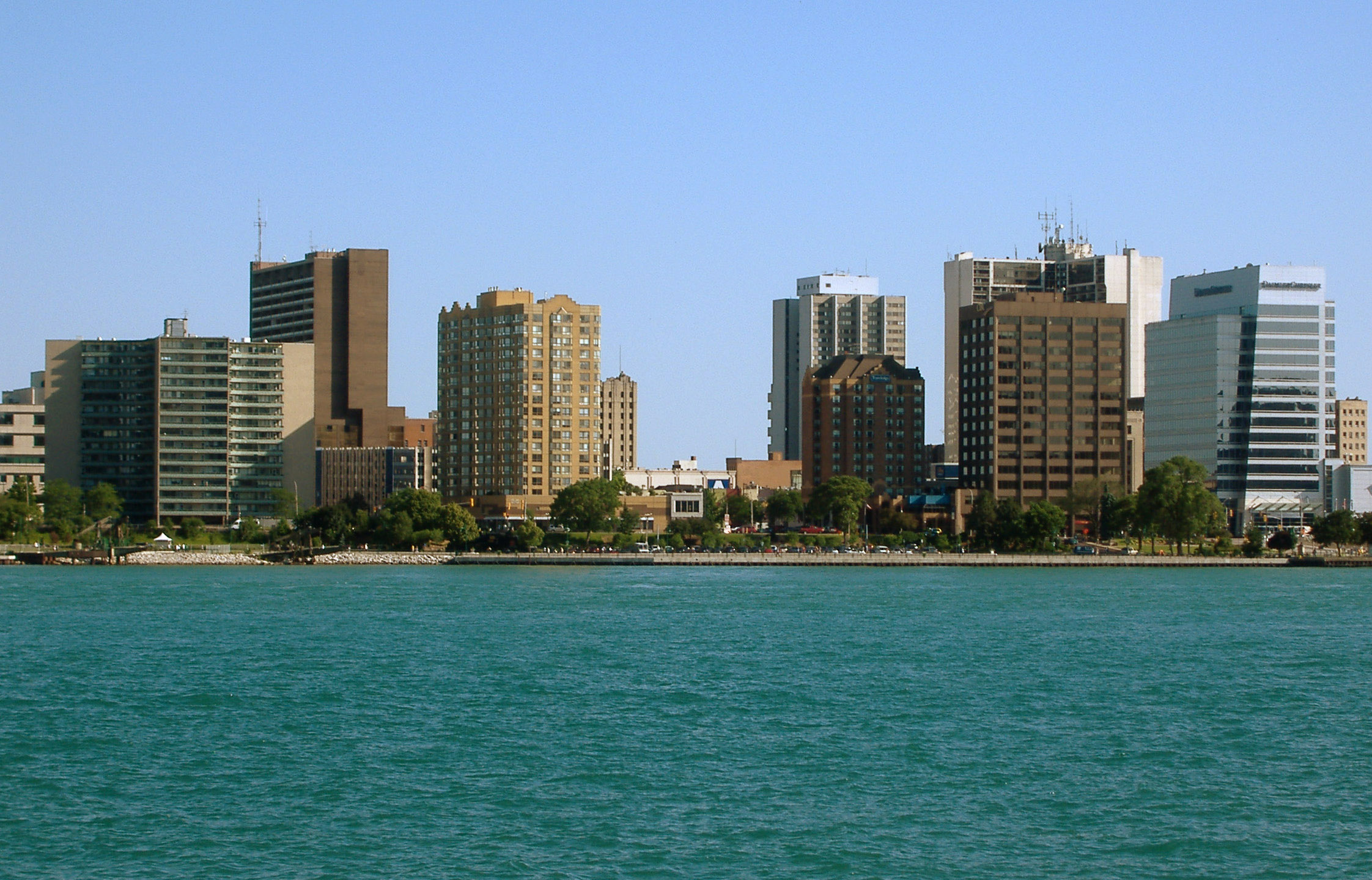
Windsor, Ontario lies on the border between Canada and the United States, directly opposite Detroit, Michigan, from where it is seen in this 2007 photograph. The two cities are separated by the Detroit River.

Mathew Charles Lamb was born in Windsor, Ontario, on 5 January 1948, the only child of a 15-year-old mother who abandoned him soon after birth. Raised by an assortment of grandparents, aunts and uncles, he rarely saw his mother while growing up and never knew his father, who died in the United States while Lamb was young. Lamb spent most of his childhood with his maternal grandmother and her new husband Christopher Collins at their home on York Street in the South Central neighbourhood of Windsor, where his presence was resented by the step-grandfather Collins. According to interviews with relatives, friends and neighbours conducted by Lamb's legal counsel Saul Nosanchuk in the mid-1960s, Collins subjected him to sustained emotional and physical abuse, beating him and frequently calling him a "little bastard". The direction of this violence was not limited to Lamb himself, however; he often witnessed his step-grandfather and grandmother fighting while he was still a small boy.

Lamb started exhibiting violent traits of his own from an early age. Nosanchuk writes that the he lured his cousins into his bedroom, locked them in a closet and threatened them. On one occasion he followed through with these threats and beat one of his cousins so badly that medical attention was required at a local hospital. "I remember once," said Greg Sweet, a childhood friend, "when he was about seven years old, he held a knife to a smaller kid and made him eat dog faeces". Lamb first attended Colbourne School in Riverside where Collins later said he appeared to be normal. School staff agreed, later telling the Windsor Star that he rarely got into trouble, and was capable, but unable to concentrate for extended periods.

Starting with Grade 8, when he was 13, Lamb went to St Jude's School in Windsor, where the other pupils found him to be distant and quiet. According to a fellow pupil, he spurned attempts by the other children to include him in their social circles. For example, Lamb once refused an invitation to a party, saying that he "didn't like to dance." Developing a keen interest in weapons, Lamb began to carry a knife to school, which he had little hesitation in showing off. He also became fascinated with firearms; according to Sweet, he and Lamb "always had guns, from the time [they] were about 12 years old". Sweet later told the Windsor Star that police were not informed when, as a teenager, Lamb strolled down a residential street "firing a shotgun at the houses of people he didn't like". Sweet also said that around this time Lamb assembled a collection of bullets and wrote the names of various local policemen on them. Lamb's hobby even extended to crude bombs, which he taught himself to produce using parts of various weapons. When he accidentally detonated one of these concoctions during preparation his leg was sprayed with shrapnel.

On 10 February 1964, barely a month after he turned 16, Lamb confronted a physically imposing police sergeant outside the Windsor Arena and, in front of a large crowd of people, leaped upon the far larger man and repeatedly punched him in the face. According to journalist Bob Sutton's account in the Windsor Star (published three years later), Lamb did this "for no apparent reason". Lamb was convicted of assault under the Juvenile Delinquents Act and served six months at the House of Concord, a young offenders' unit near London, Ontario, run by the Salvation Army. Upon his release, Lamb was sent by his step-grandfather to live in East Windsor with his uncle, Earl Hesketh. With Hesketh's support, Lamb briefly attended Assumption College School, where apart from a dislike for learning Latin, he performed creditably. However, with no real motivation to study, he soon dropped out to look for work. He was unable to hold down a permanent job and drifted through a series of short-term engagements, none lasting more than three months.

== Kingston Penitentiary ==
On the evening of 24 December 1964, Lamb smashed the front window of Lakeview Marine and Equipment, a sporting goods store in Tecumseh, and stole three revolvers and a double-barrelled shotgun. Using one of the revolvers, he fired twice on a police constable and the shop's co-owner, missing both times. The officer returned several shots, leading Lamb to come forward with his hands raised. "Don't shoot. I give up," he said. He then showed the constable where he had hidden the other two handguns and the shotgun. Lamb, who turned 17 during the trial, was tried and convicted as an adult for "breaking, entering and theft ... [and] possession of a .22 caliber revolver, dangerous to public peace". Motivated by a presentence investigation report characterizing Lamb as exceptionally violent, Magistrate J. Arthur Hanrahan sentenced him to two years at Kingston Penitentiary, a maximum security prison. According to Nosanchuk's account, the severity of the sentence was unusual for a first-time adult offender who had not caused anybody physical harm. Hanrahan, Nosanchuk writes, must have deemed Lamb beyond rehabilitation. He arrived at the penitentiary in April 1965.

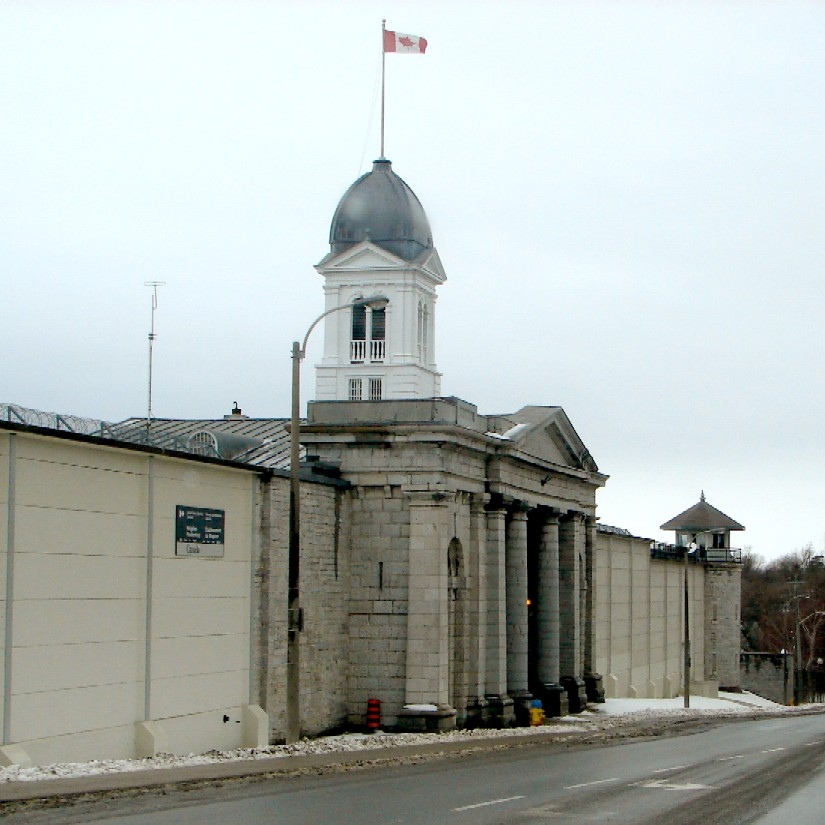
Kingston Penitentiary, where Lamb arrived in April 1965.

Psychiatric examinations and psychological tests conducted on Lamb at Kingston revealed an extremely immature young man who was strongly drawn to weapons. The prison doctors noted that he was very aggressive, did not tolerate discipline and had very little control over his behaviour. Soon after he arrived, Lamb assaulted another prisoner and had to be put into solitary confinement. The prison's director of psychiatry, George Scott, said that he had shown signs of "an obvious mental breakdown". Not long after this, Lamb knelt beside his bed and pushed a broom handle into his rectum. When he was discovered in this state by a guard, Scott examined him immediately, having to sedate him to do so. "I think this young man is developing a mental illness of hypomanic nature," he wrote in his report. In further interviews conducted by Scott, Lamb related what the doctor described as "elaborate fantasies involving robberies, fights, and shootings that demonstrated enormous hostility".

Lamb attempted suicide several times and for years afterward bore scars where he had tried to slit his wrists. According to Nosanchuk, by early March 1966, the prisoner's behaviour "bordered on psychotic". During this month he threw food at an officer and was once again found with a broomstick in his rectum, this time dragging it around the floor of his cell and laughing. When Scott sedated Lamb and questioned him on the latter incident, he said he had just been trying to annoy the guard on duty. Scott once again noted his concern that Lamb was developing a hypomanic condition, a mania of low intensity, and on 18 March committed him to Kingston Psychiatric Hospital for a month. Scott wrote in his report to the hospital that he was not sure whether Lamb's condition was genuine or whether he was just putting on an act.

Lamb returned to the penitentiary on 18 April 1966 with a report saying that, if released, he would probably relapse into recidivism. Scott grew nervous as Lamb's release date approached: he believed that allowing Lamb to return home could be dangerous for the community, but at the same time he was not certain about the young man's psychiatric state, describing it as "borderline" or "marginal". Lamb had, Scott noted, shown some minor improvement since his time in the hospital. Even discounting this, the symptoms observed in Lamb were not consistent and the doctor did not think he had evidence conclusive enough to certify Lamb as mentally unsound. He even still considered that he could just be playing immature games with the penal system. In this uncertainty, Scott resolved that he could not bar Lamb's release. The 18-year-old left Kingston on 8 June 1966, ten months ahead of schedule, and returned home to Windsor. He was taken in by another uncle, Stanley Hesketh, who lived at 1912 Ford Boulevard. Lamb secured a job as a woodworker on his release and after starting work showed no signs of irregular conduct.

== Shooting spree ==
=== Incident ===
Seventeen days after his release from Kingston Penitentiary, on the evening of 25 June 1966, Lamb discovered a shotgun in his uncle's house. He took the weapon and left the house shortly before 22:00 Eastern Time, then walked a single block north along Ford Boulevard and hid behind a tree outside number 1872. Six young people—Edith Chaykoski, 20, her 22-year-old brother Kenneth, his wife and three friends, 21-year-old Andrew Woloch, Vincent Franco and Don Mulesa—were heading south from 1635 Ford Boulevard on their way to a bus stop on Tecumseh Road when they approached the tree behind which Lamb was hiding at about 22:15. Lamb suddenly stepped out in front of the strangers, pointed the shotgun at them and said "Stop. Put up your hands!" When Edith Chaykoski stepped forward, towards Lamb, he shot her in the abdomen. Woloch then moved and was hit in the stomach by a second shot, which also wounded Kenneth Chaykoski. Lamb then ran across the street to 1867 Ford Boulevard and fired on a girl whose silhouette he had spotted in a side doorway of the house; his target, 19-year-old Grace Dunlop, was injured. As law enforcement and medical assistance were summoned, Lamb strolled away and walked two blocks before knocking on a door, which he had seemingly chosen at random. Pointing the shotgun at the elderly lady who lived there, Ann Heaton, he threatened to kill her. When Heaton cried out to her husband Forrest to phone the police, Lamb fled, throwing the shotgun over the old couple's fence into a field. He returned to the Hesketh house and went to sleep.

Edith Chaykoski died from her wounds at Windsor Metropolitan Hospital at about 05:30 on 26 June. Police searched the neighbourhood during the morning and found the shotgun where Lamb had thrown it. They identified it as Hesketh's and concluded that the 18-year-old must have taken it and gone on a shooting spree the previous day. Lamb was arrested at 15:30 on 26 June and charged with the capital murder of Edith Chaykoski. Under the terms of Canadian law at that time, he faced a mandatory death penalty if convicted. When Woloch's injuries also proved fatal at 14:45 on 11 July 1966, his murder was added to Lamb's charge.

=== Psychiatric examination ===
On the morning of 27 June 1966, Lamb appeared without legal counsel at Essex County Magistrate's Court in Windsor, where he was remanded for psychiatric examination. As he was being escorted from the courthouse at around noon, he attempted to escape custody and, when restrained, begged the officers to shoot him. A private psychiatrist from Windsor, Walter Yaworsky, gauged the teenager's mental state in an interview starting at 12:30. Yaworsky said that Lamb was "hyperactive and agitated"; he was unable to sit still and periodically rose from his seat and paced around the room. He was silent for a few minutes, apparently irritated, then began laughing as if in a state of euphoria. When questioned by Yaworsky directly, Lamb did not appear concerned about the interview: he treated his murder charge lightly and when asked about his spell in Kingston Penitentiary began laughing.

After dismissing a few more questions as "unimportant", the 18-year-old giggled childishly and said he "needed a lawyer". Lamb's conversation with the doctor continued incoherently, with Lamb "leaping from topic to topic", in Yaworsky's words. The young man continued to rise and pace around the room as the interview went on; he spoke in a casual, off-hand manner, giving non-specific answers to the doctor's questions and describing people especially vaguely. When asked about his parents, he simply said, "I don't remember." Yaworsky then inquired where his mother was, leading him to laugh as he replied, "I don't remember. Somewhere." When the doctor finally asked directly about the night of the shootings, Lamb said that he could not recall shooting anybody and that all he remembered was going home in a taxi, then being awoken by his uncle shaking him.

When the interview ended at 13:35, the doctor noted that he found Lamb's hour-long maintenance of this seemingly hypomanic behaviour "remarkable". Simulation on Lamb's part was unlikely, Yaworsky believed, and lack of memory credible. The doctor wrote in his report that Lamb had been "suffering from a disease of the mind" at the time of the shootings, which had caused him to be in a kind of dream world, outside of reality. Standing before the magistrate that same afternoon, Yaworsky testified that Lamb was mentally unsound and not fit to stand trial. The magistrate once again remanded Lamb, this time to custody at Penetanguishene Mental Health Centre for a minimum of 30 days. Lamb was again examined on 29 June 1966, this time by James Dolan, the Clinical Director of Psychiatry at St Thomas Elgin General Hospital.

Lamb described the incident for Dolan in far more detail. He said that on 25 June he had finished his woodworking job at 15:00, refused to work overtime (having put in 62 hours that week), then drunk six beers at home during the afternoon and gone to sleep at 21:00. He woke up soon after, he said, and loaded his uncle's shotgun, intending to kill himself. "Next thing I knew," he continued, "I was on the street." He told Dolan that he had seen people "as if they were on television". He heard the sound of a gun being fired as if it were coming from far away, and remembered a voice that was not his own saying "Put up your hands". He then remembered hearing the dim, far-off gun again, a vision of a terrified man standing before him, then yet another shot. He told Dolan he remembered crossing the street, seeing a girl's outline in a doorway and "somehow" shooting at her. Lamb then said he had fired at a passing car, and that "everything seemed unreal." He said that the next thing he had memory of was confronting an elderly lady at a house nearby, suddenly thinking "what the hell am I in here for" and leaving. He concluded his account by saying that he had hailed a cab from the corner of Pillette and Tecumseh Road and gone back to his uncle's house.

After 30 days, on 27 July, the staff at Penetanguishene still deemed him unfit to stand trial, but by 27 August 1966 his state had improved enough for the doctors to allow his return to custody at Windsor. The doctors reported that he could now face the court—they said that the young man was now able to understand what the proceedings against him meant, and capable of working alongside a legal advisor. Because Lamb could not afford legal counsel, Justice Saul Nosanchuk was assigned by a local legal aid plan to advise him in the upcoming trial. Nosanchuk says that Lamb had "no hesitation" in signing a paper authorizing the justice to represent him.

=== Mental disorder defence ===
He did not really appear to be deeply concerned as to what would happen to him as a result of the charge against him even though he faced the death penalty if convicted of capital murder. He seemed quite prepared to let justice take its course.

— Justice Saul Nosanchuk describes his first interview with Lamb

Nosanchuk quickly resolved that the only way to win the case and prevent the teenager from being hanged was to explore the background and circumstances both of the incident and of Lamb himself with a view to a mental disorder defence. At their first interview together, Nosanchuk says that Lamb was a "slightly built, almost frail, quiet and detached 18-year-old ... very boyish in appearance. He had an exceedingly polite demeanour. He was most appreciative and grateful that I had undertaken his defence." When Nosanchuk asked him about the events of 25 June, Lamb became hesitant, disjointed and confused in his conversation; "he seemed to view these events as if he was not really involved in them," Nosanchuk recalled. Lamb said that although he did have a faint recollection of what had happened, he could not remember taking the shotgun, loading it or shooting anybody. He said that earlier during the afternoon on 25 June he had watched a film on television in which somebody had shot and killed several people, but did not make clear whether he had been re-enacting this. The lawyer then asked Lamb to discuss his personal background, childhood and family. The 18-year-old was very reluctant to do so and when he did, Nosanchuk says that he seemed emotionally detached from the relatives and events he described.

Lamb appeared to the justice to be a profoundly troubled young man. There was no doubt that he had killed Chaykoski and Woloch, he had not acted in self-defence and there was no evidence of provocation; the chances of reducing the murder charge to manslaughter were therefore slim. Nosanchuk felt obliged, in the light of Lamb's psychiatric and personal history, to explore an insanity plea. The lawyer interviewed Yaworsky and Dolan, secured them as witnesses for the trial, and also reviewed a report from four doctors at Penetanguishene who had previously interviewed his client. According to this report, Lamb had been amiable, fluent in his conversation and apparently plausible; he at first claimed amnesia for the events of 25 June, but on continued questioning related what had happened "in detail". He admitted his responsibility but still did not appear to be concerned about what had happened. He did not seem to be able to emotionally appreciate the consequences of his actions, even though he understood on an intellectual level that he had shot at some people and that to do that was wrong. When he told the psychiatrists that he regretted what he had done, they wrote that he "clearly did not have any real underlying feeling of remorse". He also did not appear to have considered that he might have any illness, mental or otherwise. The Penetanguishene report concluded that Lamb "suffered from a disease of the mind as a pathological anti-social or psychopathic personality", which was a recognized psychiatric disorder under the Criminal Code and therefore grounds for an insanity defence in court.

However, Nosanchuk was still not certain that he would attempt to defend Lamb on mental grounds. In Ontario at that time, a defendant found not guilty under these terms remained imprisoned indefinitely unless an order for his release came from the province's Executive Council, acting on the advice of a Review Board including a Supreme Court judge. Yaworsky warned Nosanchuk that even if he used an insanity defence and won, Lamb would probably be committed to an institution for the criminally insane for life. It was still possible for the lawyer to approach the prosecution and propose a plea bargain, offering to plead guilty to non-capital murder, which would result in life imprisonment for Lamb but allow a parole hearing after 10 years. In any case, Nosanchuk could not use the case he had prepared unless he first received unequivocal written instruction from his client to plead insanity. Having been given a week by his counsel to consider the matter, Lamb wrote to Nosanchuk that he wished to attempt a mental disorder defence. He made clear his understanding that if he were found not guilty under these terms, the state still had the right to detain him for the rest of his life.

Nosanchuk then considered whether or not to call Lamb to the stand on his own behalf at the trial. He already had a strong defence, with five psychiatrists firmly behind him as well as George Scott of Kingston Penitentiary, who had agreed to testify on his behalf. The lawyer considered his's probable reaction to a cross-examination by the prosecution in court. Lamb appeared calm and collected on the surface, and had so far answered questions about right and wrong in a somewhat rational way. Although the doctors had been able to see Lamb's answers for what they really were, Nosanchuk feared that Lamb's appearance could actually lead the jury to believe that he was sane, which might lead to a guilty verdict and the gallows. He therefore did not call Lamb to the stand.

== Trial ==
After a brief preliminary hearing starting on 8 October 1966, during which Lamb reportedly showed no signs of emotion, the young man's trial for capital murder began on 16 January 1967 at Essex County Courthouse in Windsor. Because of the charge's severity, the case was heard by a judge and jury under the auspices of Ontario's Supreme Court, which chose Justice Alexander Stark to preside. The trial started with Lamb pleading not guilty to the capital murder of Edith Chaykoski and Andrew Woloch; Nosanchuk then opened his mental disorder defence under Section 562 of the Canadian Criminal Code. Stark gave an order allowing all relevant psychiatric doctors to remain, then allowed the Crown to open its case against Lamb.

=== Testimonies and cross-examinations ===
==== Prosecution ====
The prosecutor, Eugene Duchesne, began his case by calling Mathew Lamb's uncle, Stanley Hesketh, to the stand. Hesketh testified that three hours after the shootings his nephew had told him that he "must have done it". He said that since his nephew had come to live with him following his release from prison, he had always been exceptionally polite and helpful to his family. However, during the morning of 26 June Lamb had for the first time been hesitant, not giving full answers to questions and generally acting in a less open manner. Duchesne then called witnesses of the shootings, who agreed unanimously that Lamb had been unhurried, cool and collected. When cross-examined by Nosanchuk about this unusual calmness, they said that Lamb had appeared very distant and did not seem to have any bearing on what was happening around him: one of the witnesses said that Lamb had not appeared to even notice a very loud party in progress across the street. Heaton said that he had looked frightened and had fled without reason when she called to her husband. The police officers who arrested Lamb also agreed that the defendant had been unusually cool and silent. Hesketh told the court that when he had come home his nephew had been fast asleep in bed.

==== Defence ====
The defence began to present its psychiatric evidence on the third day of the trial, 18 January 1967, when Yaworsky was called to testify on Lamb's behalf. Yaworsky recounted in detail his examination of the defendant two days after the shootings; he put weight on the fact that Lamb had laughed while incoherently describing the events of 25 June, and had at one point giggled and exclaimed "poor broad", referring to Edith Chaykoski. So far Lamb had sat through the trial in muted silence, showing no emotion whatsoever, but when Yaworsky mentioned his having "giggled" at this point of the 27 June interview, Lamb did so again in a similar manner. Yaworsky said that he had interviewed Lamb four more times between December 1966 and the trial, and that in these discussions the young man had been able to remember more about the incident; Lamb told Yaworsky that he remembered confronting the people in the street, but that everything had then "felt fuzzy" when he fired the gun. Yaworsky quoted Lamb: "It was as if I was invisible. ... The next clear memory I have is standing minutes later in the Heaton living room. All of a sudden, I was standing there with a gun in my hand—that is when I ran out." The doctor hypothesized that this had been when Lamb returned to the real world following a psychopathic episode during which he had been divorced from reality. Dolan then testified along similar lines, describing his interview with Lamb two days after Yaworsky's and telling the court that he also believed that Lamb had had a psychotic break that had made him unable to appreciate "the nature and quality of the act of killing another human being".

In his cross-examination of the two doctors, Duchesne cited the psychological reports filed on Lamb at Penetanguishene in 1966, which had determined Lamb to have an IQ of 125, far above most of his 18-year-old peers. The prosecutor proposed that it was not beyond Lamb, with his psychopathic personality and high level of intelligence, to invent a story of amnesia and confusion to avoid responsibility for satisfying his dangerous impulses by consciously killing people. Both Yaworsky and Dolan said that although this was possible, they were each sticking to their original conclusions made in the days following the incident.

... we isolated him at his own request because he was afraid of what he might do. Lamb had two totally different personalities. When he was in his proper state of mind, he was a fellow you couldn't help but like. But he could be vicious.

— John Robinson, governor of Essex County Jail, quoted in the Windsor Star, 27 November 1976

John Robinson, the governor of Essex County Jail, was then called by the defence. Robinson testified that during Lamb's time in the county jail, his conduct had been impeccable except for an incident five weeks before the trial, on 10 December 1966, when he had, for no apparent reason, gone on what Robinson called a "rampage". In an episode lasting three hours, the defendant had smashed over 100 windows, set fire to blankets and broken plumbing, causing cells to flood. "I was amazed by what I saw," Robinson said. "The pupils were dilated like someone who comes in heavy on narcotics—except their eyes appear sunk in and his were bulged out." George Scott of Kingston Penitentiary then told the court that Lamb lived in a fantasy dream world, which had existed in his mind since early childhood, and had been in a pre-psychotic state when released from jail on 8 June 1966. This, he said, had boiled over into an "acute schizoid episode" on the night of the shootings. In cross-examination, Scott was pressed as to why he had allowed Lamb's release from Kingston if this was the case; he replied that although the prison officers had been concerned about Lamb's mental state on his release, there had not been conclusive grounds to certify him insane at that time.

Three more psychiatrists from Penetanguishene were then called by Nosanchuk. George Darby told the court that in his conversations with Lamb the defendant had changed his story three times. He considered Lamb to be anti-social, aggressive and psychopathic—unable to appreciate the incident's consequences with any depth of feeling. Elliot Barker then testified that Lamb had told him in an interview that he treated all people "like bugs" except for his uncle and grandmother; killing a human being, Barker told the court, meant nothing more to Lamb than swatting a fly. Barry Boyd then confirmed what Barker had said, and quoted something Lamb had told him in an interview: "I hate everybody on the street. I probably will kill someone else before I die—it doesn't bother me—it's like killing a bug." Elizabeth Willet, a psychologist from the Penetanguishene unit, then testified that in her tests Lamb had indeed been revealed to have a high IQ, but had also been shown to have the emotional maturity of a small child, aged between 3 and 6. He had few defence mechanisms, she said, and when confronted by impulses acted them out almost without exception and without appreciating their consequences.

==== Prosecution ====
Duchesne now called on Basil Orchard and Wilfred Boothroyd to counter the defence's evidence. Orchard, another doctor from Penetanguishene, testified that Lamb had suddenly abandoned any show of amnesia during an interview in August 1966. He saw no evidence that Lamb was insane and said that he was simply a young man with strong impulses who sometimes could not control them. Boothroyd, of Sunnybrook Hospital in Toronto, then spoke, arguing that Lamb had been acting out strong feelings of anger and bitterness and fully intended to kill the people he confronted, knowing and understanding what that meant. Lamb, he said, was capable of all kinds of emotion and was perfectly able to understand the nature of what he had done. Justice Stark intervened during Boothroyd's testimony, asking how he could give a reliable opinion on Lamb when he had never examined him. He also remarked that his opinion was contrary to every doctor who had testified so far.

=== Closing statements ===
==== Defence ====
... Here was a young teenager who had a glaring defect in his capacity to feel or appreciate what he was doing. Here was a young teenager living in a fantasy or dream world, unconnected with reality. Here was a teenager who was insane at the time of the shootings.

— Extract from Saul Nosanchuk's closing statement, 20 January 1967

Nosanchuk gave his final statement to the court first. Speaking for the defence, he reminded the jury that every one of the doctors speaking on Lamb's behalf had originally been engaged by the state and that Yaworsky was the only one not employed in the public sector. He conceded that the defendant's actions were senseless and violent, but stressed that if found not guilty by reason of insanity, Lamb would stay in custody and could be kept in psychiatric care for the rest of his life if necessary. He argued that Lamb's actions on the evening of 25 June 1966 clearly made no sense and asked the jury to carefully consider them: the victims were not known to Lamb; Lamb made no attempt to disguise himself; Lamb acted alone; Lamb had nothing to gain from the act; Lamb inexplicably diverted his fire from the original group to a shadow in a doorway; Lamb then chose another house at random and threatened to kill the occupant, then left without doing anything; Lamb made no attempt to hide the weapon, leaving it in a nearby field where it would surely be found; then, finally, he simply went home to bed as if nothing had happened. Was this, Nosanchuk asked, the behaviour of a premeditated killer, or of a profoundly disturbed young man who did not appreciate what he was doing?

==== Prosecution ====
... Would slick con artists have a field day in striving to be classified as insane and not criminally responsible? Would the shrewd psychopathic criminal have a much easier time in the hospital for the mentally ill than in a federal penitentiary? ...

— Eugene Duchesne QC counters Nosanchuk's closing statement

In response, Duchesne gave what Nosanchuk writes was a "well-reasoned argument", which the jury paid rapt attention to. Duchesne declared that the incident had been the cold, calculated murder of a defenceless group of innocent young people by an ex-convict, released only three weeks earlier and already known as an anti-social psychopath. The defendant had given wildly conflicting stories to different doctors, Duchesne said, yet had convinced each one. Duchesne said that this was possible as Lamb was highly intelligent and able to project a false front if it suited him. The prosecutor then moved off the topic of Lamb's mental state and focussed on the matter of criminal responsibility in general. Five out of the eight psychiatrists in the court, the prosecutor said, had testified that Lamb had understood on an intellectual level that shooting Chaykoski and Woloch would kill them, which he asserted should be enough to incur criminal responsibility, even taking the psychiatric evidence into account. Finding Lamb not guilty by reason of insanity, he reasoned, would provide an inexpedient precedent in Canadian law and cause a spate of similar insanity defence attempts.

=== Verdict ===
Justice Stark then reviewed the evidence and advised the jury that in his opinion the weight of psychiatric evidence favoured the defence; however, he reminded them, it was up to them to decide. The jury retired at 16:30 on 20 January 1967 to make their decision, and returned to the courtroom shortly before 19:00 to give their verdict. They found Lamb to be not guilty by reason of insanity. Lamb showed no reaction when the verdict was read.

== Psychiatric care ==
=== Treatment at Oak Ridge ===
He [Lamb] was one of Elliott [Barker]'s ... I wouldn't want to say 'all-stars', but he had about as cold a personality as psychopaths have and he really seemed to warm up and benefit from the program.

— Dr Gary Maier, a psychiatrist at Penetanguishene during Lamb's time there, talks to author Jon Ronson

As had been made clear several times before and during the trial, Lamb's court victory did not make him a free man. He was escorted by police back to Penetanguishene and placed in the hospital's maximum security unit at Oak Ridge, where he was to remain indefinitely pending an order from the Ontario Executive Council.

Elliot Barker, the head of Oak Ridge's therapeutic division, had already interviewed Lamb in 1966 and spoken on his behalf at his trial. The doctor had arrived at Penetanguishene in 1959, and in 1965 stepped up his efforts to reform the unit's programmes, which on his arrival were still based around the traditional methods of neuroleptic tranquillization and electroconvulsive therapy, supplemented by long periods of isolation for each inmate. Barker innovated a programme whereby the patients could spend more of their time in each other's company, in a more natural environment; he believed that the key to overcoming these illnesses was communication. "My original vision," he writes, "was that I wasn't really dealing with patients. I thought we could evolve a social structure where people could resolve the internal conflicts in community." Barker's "Social Therapy Unit" (STU), initially made up exclusively of young male psychopaths and schizophrenics of normal intelligence, began in September 1965, with a programme of 80 hours of treatment a week, focussing on cures brought about by mutual cooperation and interaction. Joan Hollobon, the medical editor of the Toronto Globe and Mail, volunteered in 1967 to spend two days at Oak Ridge as if she were a patient, and afterwards heaped praise on the inmates, saying that they were "pioneering a brave and exciting experiment in self-government and self-therapy ... [displaying] individual responsibility, co-operation with colleagues and authority, and acceptance of rules reached by consensus."

In August 1968, the unit created a "Total Encounter Capsule", which was a windowless, soundproofed room, 8 feet (2.4 m) wide and 10 feet (3.0 m) long, with green-painted walls, a green wall-to-wall mat on the floor and a ceiling containing a one-way mirror. It was empty apart from a sink and lavatory. In one of the earliest uses of videotape in therapy, television cameras were trained through the mirrored ceiling and through holes in the walls. Liquid nourishment was provided through drinking straws that were built into the door. The Capsule's purpose, Barker writes, was to provide "a place of undisturbed security where a small group of patients could focus on issues they felt important enough to warrant the exclusion of the usual physical and psychological distractions." Though participation in the STU programme was required, entering the Capsule was voluntary, and each patient could choose how many days he spent inside. Groups numbered between two and seven and stayed in the room for as little as 24 hours or for sustained periods as long as 11 days. Because Barker believed that they were more inclined to reveal their inner selves if unclothed, the inmates entered the Capsule naked. To further encourage communication, they were administered with LSD-25. The room was lit at all times, making day indistinguishable from night. While members of the programme were inside the Capsule, other patients operated the room and watched over those inside, running the cameras, keeping records and maintaining an appropriate room temperature.

Following his arrival in January 1967, Lamb enthusiastically took part and thrived in Barker's new programmes, becoming, the Montreal Gazette writes, "a model inmate". He became widely respected by his fellow patients and was successfully nominated as the ward's "patient therapist". "He was helpful to the other patients," Barker told the Globe and Mail, "and they looked up to him." Barker elaborated on this subject in an interview with the Windsor Star, telling them that during 1972 Lamb had been "one of the most respected therapists in the hospital". Lamb started a newspaper at Oak Ridge, for which he wrote articles while also encouraging others to contribute. Barker and his colleagues were so impressed by the young man's progress that they began to take him to lectures at Ontario Police College in Aylmer, where they introduced him as evidence of rehabilitation's potential. After about five years at Oak Ridge, the matter of Lamb's liberty was taken up by a five-man Advisory Review Board made up of Ontario Supreme Court Justice Edson Haines, two independent psychiatrists unrelated to Lamb's case, a lawyer and a lay person. The advisory board's recommendation that Lamb be released was approved by the Ontario Executive Council in early 1973; the board gave him a clean bill of health and said he was no longer dangerous.

=== Release and further improvement ===
When Matt Lamb was released into the community he had a better mental health clearance than you or I.

— Dr Elliot Barker, quoted in the Windsor Star, 10 November 1976

The conditions of Lamb's release were that he must spend a year living with the Barker family on their 200 acres (0.81 km^{2}; 0.31 sq mi) farm, under the doctor's observation. The former inmate proved to be an industrious labourer, helping to fence the property and becoming one of the farm's best workers. Barker and his wife came to trust Lamb so closely that they allowed him to babysit their three-year-old daughter, who became very attached to the young man. During his time living and working on the farm, Lamb read a number of books on psychiatry, including The Mask of Sanity by Hervey M. Cleckley, which affected him particularly. He told the doctor that he had come to terms with his condition as a psychopath and that he wished to go overseas and do something purposeful with his life. At the same time, he considered a career in the military, which Barker supported. "He wanted that kind of life," Barker later told the Globe and Mail. "He really seemed to need the esprit de corps of an army organisation." When Egypt and Syria attacked Israel on 6 October 1973, starting the Yom Kippur War, Lamb thought he had found his calling—using money he had saved from his labourer's salary and gifts from his grandmother, he bought State of Israel Bonds and, with Barker's encouragement, travelled to Israel to volunteer for the Israel Defense Forces. However, after hitch-hiking to the Israeli lines, Lamb became disillusioned by conversations he had with the soldiers there, many of whom were loath to fight and wanted to go home. He applied anyway but was turned down because of his psychiatric history. He resolved to instead tour the world, and to that end left Israel days after arriving, intending to travel to Australia.

== Military career in Rhodesia ==
Rhodesia (today Zimbabwe), highlighted in red on a map of Africa

On his way to Australia in October 1973, Lamb stopped off in South Africa and Rhodesia (today Zimbabwe), where he cut his travels short to enlist in the Rhodesian Army. According to Barker, Lamb travelled to Africa with this intention all along. Rhodesia's unrecognized and predominantly white government was at that time fighting a war against communist-backed black nationalist guerrillas who were attempting to introduce majority rule. Like most of the foreign volunteers in the Rhodesian forces, Lamb was assigned to the Rhodesian Light Infantry (RLI), an all-white heliborne commando battalion engaged largely in counter-insurgency operations. He and the other foreign soldiers received the same pay and conditions of service as the Rhodesians they served alongside. Keeping his past a secret, he became a highly regarded and popular member of 3 Commando, RLI, noted for his professionalism and physical fitness. "The Rhodesians thought he was a first-class soldier," Barker later told the Globe and Mail.

Lamb visited his aunt and uncle in Windsor on leave in May 1975, "proudly wearing his uniform", journalist Tony Wanless writes. Turned out in the RLI's tartan green ceremonial dress and green beret, he was conspicuous walking along Ouellette Avenue, one of the city's main thoroughfares. Coincidentally, a funeral procession was being held for Edith Chaykoski's grandmother along that very street at the same time, leading Edith's younger brother Richard to spot Lamb on the pavement. The soldier remained oblivious, but his presence horrified the Chaykoski family. "He had the uniform and looked a little different," Richard told the Windsor Star a year later, "but I never forgot his face." Chaykoski's mother was so upset by the incident that for some time afterwards she refused to leave the house alone. While staying with the Hesketh family, Lamb went to see Barker and told him that serving in the Rhodesian security forces had enriched him personally and made him respect himself for the first time. Because of this he wished to forget about his previous life in Canada; in particular he said he "didn't want it associated with his adopted country". He expressed his concern that if he were killed or captured, the Canadian press might reveal his prior history and embarrass the Rhodesian Army, the Canadian government and the Penetanguishene mental hospital. However, he said, he felt great loyalty towards Rhodesia and would still go back to continue his service.

Lamb was deeply saddened by the bias he perceived the Western media to have against the Rhodesian government and army, but was reportedly conspicuous for leaping to the defence of any black Rhodesians he thought were receiving bad treatment. "He sympathised with the blacks," Barker told the Windsor Star, "but believed that chaos would result if they took over immediately. He used to scrap with other soldiers who treated blacks badly. He was very bright and knew the blacks would eventually take over the country."

Soon after his furlough to Canada, Lamb was transferred from the RLI to the elite Special Air Service (SAS) unit in September 1975. There he trained as a paratrooper and, after passing selection, found himself in a vastly different role to the one he had become used to during his time in the RLI. Rather than taking part in the RLI's fast and furious Fireforce counter-strike procedures, he found himself taking part in covert reconnaissance actions, "acting as eyes and ears," as Barbara Cole writes. Wishing to see more action, Lamb requested a posting back to the RLI, which was granted; he rejoined 3 Commando. In late 1976, at the age of 28, he was promoted to lance corporal and took command of a "stick" of four men from 12 Troop, 3 Commando on Fireforce duty on Operation Thrasher, which covered Rhodesia's eastern highlands against guerrilla activity.

In the late afternoon of 7 November 1976, three insurgents from a group of seven were spotted by an Army observation post in the Mutema Tribal Trust Lands, just south-west of Birchenough Bridge in Manicaland province. Fireforce was called up and the Rhodesians readied themselves to fly out by helicopter and engage the guerrillas. There were eight four-man "stops" involved in a Fireforce, and on this occasion Lamb headed Stop 2. Just before they left, Lamb ran over to Lance-Corporal Phil Kaye, the leader of Stop 3, and shouted over the noise of the aircraft. "They are going to get me this time," he yelled, sardonically; "Just you watch, Phil Kaye!" Kaye and his MAG gunner, Trooper Pat Grogan, waved away this comment and told Lamb to get moving. "Go nail gooks!" Kaye called after Lamb as he and the rest of Stop 2 took off aboard their Alouette III gunship. Lamb's men were an 18-year-old national service MAG gunner of Portuguese-Rhodesian extraction named Trooper Soares; Trooper Cornelius Olivier, a 20-year-old Rhodesian regular who carried an FN FAL battle rifle; and Trooper Tony Rok, an Australian Vietnam veteran, aged 28 and also equipped with an FN. Lamb carried the stick's radio on his back with his FN FAL ready in his hands.

Stop 2 landed, formed up into a sweep line and marched carefully to the north alongside a dry riverbed. As darkness fell, just as they came to a widening in the riverbed, they were suddenly fired upon by an unseen foe. All four men dropped to the ground to avoid being hit. The Canadian lance-corporal called for covering fire from Soares, which he provided as Lamb and Rok rose to their feet and cautiously moved forward. A dark figure suddenly ran across the soldiers' line of sight, between Lamb and the riverbed, and from a distance of about 16 paces Olivier reflexively swung his rifle around and let off a frenzied, imprecise burst of fire. Mortally wounded by two errant shots through the chest, Lamb stumbled, slumped to the ground and lay face-down in a heap. One of the bullets exited through the back of his body, smashing the radio he had been carrying. He died almost instantly. Meanwhile, the cadres ahead ran headlong into Stop 1, led by Sergeant Derrick Taylor, and were all killed in the ensuing fire fight. Taylor's stick sustained no casualties. When the battle was over, Stops 1 and 3 joined Olivier, Rok and Soares and waited beside Lamb's lifeless body all night until it could be evacuated by helicopter to the local hospital at Chipinga. The death was officially recorded as "killed in action", with no reference to friendly fire.

== Reactions to death; military funeral and burial ==
... his comrades gave him a hero's funeral. Back home in Windsor, Ont., however, Lamb was anything but a hero...

— Extract from Newsweek article entitled "Rhodesia: The Hero", 13 December 1976

As Lamb had predicted, his death provoked stories in the Canadian local and national media that strongly stressed his history of violence and insanity. It even caused a heated debate in the Canadian House of Commons over why, considering his personal history in Ontario and subsequent service in the armed forces of a country Canada did not recognize, Lamb had been issued a valid Canadian passport and allowed to renew it on 26 April 1976. The Chaykoski family received the news with some relief, Wanless reported in the Windsor Star, having "lived in terror" since Lamb's release from Penetanguishene three years earlier.

In Rhodesia, by contrast, Lamb was posthumously held in very high regard by the men who had served alongside him. His photograph in full dress uniform was placed on 3 Commando's Wall of Honour and remained there until the RLI was disbanded in 1980. When the story of his earlier life in Canada was run by the Rhodesia Herald, the paper received numerous strongly worded letters from soldiers who refused to believe it. They demanded a printed retraction and apology, which the Herald gave soon after to preempt any further scandal. The lance-corporal was given what the Windsor Star and Newsweek both described as a "hero's funeral" in the Rhodesian capital, Salisbury, on 15 November 1976. No members of his family were present. His coffin, draped in the Rhodesian flag and topped with a large bouquet of flowers, was carried on a gun carriage to Warren Hills Cemetery, on the western outskirts of the city, where soldiers of the RLI fired three volleys of shots and senior officers saluted as the coffin was carried to the crematorium on the shoulders of eight RLI men. Lamb's ashes were afterwards returned to his relatives in Windsor, Ontario, where they were buried alongside the remains of his grandmother.

== Notes and references ==
=== Online sources ===
- "City of Windsor: Heritage". citywindsor.ca. City of Windsor. Archived from the original on 18 May 2012.
- "L/Cpl. Mathew C. Lamb". Rhodesian Light Infantry Regimental Association. Archived from the original on 3 March 2012.

=== Newspaper and journal articles ===
- Bruner, Arnold (10 November 1976). "Killed Two in Ontario, Canadian slain in Rhodesia". The Globe and Mail. Toronto, Ontario: FP Publications. p. 3.
- Caunce, Ken; Spicer, Dick (27 June 1966). "Charge Youth Ambush Slayer: Girl, 20, dies; trio wounded". The Windsor Star. Windsor, Ontario: Postmedia News. pp. 1, 3, 20.
- Hughes, David; Rogers, Mike; Kaye, Phil; Henderson, Carl; Rok, Tony (2002). "Truth is sometimes stranger than fiction: the true story of Mathew Charles Lamb". Winged Chatter. Durban: SAS Association of Southern Africa: 26–41.
- McNulty, Jim (27 November 1976). "Remembering... Jail governor John Robinson". The Windsor Star. Windsor, Ontario: Postmedia News. p. 5.
- Scaglione, Cec (12 July 1966). "Second shotgun victim dies: 17-day battle for life fails". The Windsor Star. Windsor, Ontario: Postmedia News. pp. 3, 6.
- Sutton, Bob (25 January 1967). "Portrait of Matthew C. Lamb: About a man going insane". The Windsor Star. Windsor, Ontario: Postmedia News. p. 29.
- Wanless, Tony (10 November 1976). "Death comes in Rhodesia: The bloody life of Mathew Lamb". The Windsor Star. Windsor, Ontario: Postmedia News. pp. 1, 4.
- Wanless, Tony (11 November 1976). "Flashback on 'a mean kid'". The Windsor Star. Windsor, Ontario: Postmedia News. p. 3.
- "Canadian killed in Rhodesia army". The Calgary Herald. Calgary, Alberta: Postmedia News. 12 November 1976. p. 9.
- "Chairman denies stalemate in straggling Geneva talks". The Gazette. Montreal, Quebec: Postmedia News. Reuters. 10 November 1976. p. 2.
- "Army casualty had bad record". The Leader-Post. Regina, Saskatchewan. 10 November 1976. p. 22.
- "Soldier's ashes flown to Ontario". The Leader-Post. Regina, Saskatchewan. 23 November 1976. p. 2.
- "Mathew Charles Lamb". The Rhodesia Herald. Salisbury: Argus Group. 16 November 1976. p. 1.
- "Shotgun Barrage Kills One And Wounds Three". The Washington Reporter. Washington, Pennsylvania: The Observer Publishing Company. 27 June 1966. p. 22.
- "Youth Given Two Years For Gunfight". The Windsor Star. Windsor, Ontario: Postmedia News. 14 January 1965. p. 5.
- "Death probe to continue next Friday". The Windsor Star. Windsor, Ontario: Postmedia News. 8 October 1966. p. 3.
- "Lamb told story of shootings: 'Remembered all' to psychiatrist". The Windsor Star. Windsor, Ontario: Postmedia News. 19 January 1967. pp. 3, 6.
- "Ex-Windsor man believed slain in Rhodesian clash". The Windsor Star. Windsor, Ontario: Postmedia News. 9 November 1976. pp. 1, 4.
- "A hero's funeral for Lamb". The Windsor Star. Windsor, Ontario: Postmedia News. 15 November 1976. p. 1.
- "Lamb's ashes on way home". The Windsor Star. Windsor, Ontario: Postmedia News. 23 November 1976. p. 5.
- "Chimurenga war communiqué No. 8. Period from 30 Jan to 20 March 1974". Lusaka: Zimbabwe African National Union. 27 March 1974.

=== Bibliography ===
- Binda, Alexandre (May 2008). The Saints: The Rhodesian Light Infantry. Johannesburg: 30° South Publishers. ISBN 978-1-920143-07-7.
- Cilliers, Jakkie (December 1984). Counter-Insurgency in Rhodesia. London, Sydney & Dover, New Hampshire: Croom Helm. ISBN 978-0-7099-3412-7.
- Cole, Barbara (April 2000) [1985]. The Elite: the Story of the Rhodesian Special Air Service (Third ed.). Roodeport: Covos-Day Books. ISBN 978-0-620-08517-5.
- House of Commons of Canada (1977). "Mathew Charles Lamb". Debates: Official Report. 8. Ottawa, Ontario: Queen's Printer.
- Nielsen, Robert F. (2000). Total Encounters: The Life and Times of the Mental Health Centre Penetanguishene. Hamilton, Ontario: McMaster University Press. ISBN 0-920603-60-2.
- Nosanchuk, Saul (2005) [27 October 1999]. "Revisiting the Insanity Defence: The Capital Murder Trial of Mathew Charles Lamb". In Greenspad, Edward L. (ed.). Counsel for the Defence: The Bernard Cohn Memorial Lectures in Criminal Law. Toronto, Ontario: Irwin Law. pp. 67–92. ISBN 1-55221-102-9.
- Ronson, Jon (12 May 2011). The Psychopath Test: A Journey Through the Madness Industry. New York: Riverhead Books. ISBN 978-1-59448-801-6.
- Strouse, Jean, ed. (1976). Newsweek. 88 (18–26). New York: Washington Post Company. ISSN 0028-9604.
- Toffan, Will (2020). Watching the Devil Dance: How a Spree Killer Slipped Through the Cracks of the Criminal Justice System. Windsor: Biblioasis. ISBN 978-1-77196-325-1.
