= Foreign volunteers in the Rhodesian Security Forces =

Non-Rhodesian army recruits from 1973 to 1980

- Dates active: 1973 to 1980
- Allegiance: Rhodesia
- Size: Estimates range from 800 to 2,000
- Part of: Rhodesian Security Forces

The Rhodesian government actively recruited white personnel from other countries from the mid-1970s until 1980 to address manpower shortages in the Rhodesian Security Forces during the Rhodesian Bush War. It is estimated that between 800 and 2,000 foreign volunteers enlisted. The issue attracted a degree of controversy as Rhodesia was the subject of international sanctions that banned military assistance due to its illegal declaration of independence and the control that the small white minority exerted over the country. The volunteers were often labelled as mercenaries by opponents of the Rhodesian regime, though the Rhodesian government did not regard or pay them as such.

The volunteers had a range of motivations for enlisting. These included anti-communism, racism, economic hardship, opposition to governments led by black people and a desire for adventure. The volunteers generally joined the Rhodesian Security Forces after seeing advertisements or being contacted by recruiters. Many were from the United Kingdom and United States, some being combat veterans. A small number were black men from other African countries. They generally served alongside Rhodesian personnel, though a separate unit made up of Frenchmen was formed. The Rhodesian government regarded the volunteers as unreliable, and they often received a hostile response from members of the units to which they were posted. This contributed to high desertion rates. The remaining volunteers were dismissed from the security forces in 1980 following the end of the war and Rhodesia's transition to Zimbabwe.

It was illegal for the citizens of many countries to serve with the Rhodesian Security Forces due to the international sanctions that had been imposed on Rhodesia following its illegal declaration of independence, or broader prohibitions against mercenary activity. The governments of the United Kingdom, United States and several other countries were unable to prevent their citizens fighting for Rhodesia owing to difficulties enforcing their relevant laws. The African nationalist groups who opposed the Rhodesian government believed the presence of volunteers indicated that Western governments supported the regime. Historians have published little on the volunteers, with coverage largely forming part of works on broader issues. The volunteers are celebrated by some modern far-right and white supremacist groups that admire Rhodesia.

== Background ==
=== Political situation ===
Rhodesia's location in Africa

Southern Rhodesia was a self-governing British colony located in southern Africa that had been founded by the British South Africa Company in 1890 and achieved self-government in 1923. Its economy and government were controlled by the small white minority of its population. The white minority enjoyed a good standard of living due to cheap labour provided by the black majority; in 1970 the average income of white Rhodesians was R$3,104 and black Rhodesians R$312.

Between 1953 and 1963, Southern Rhodesia was federated with the British colonies of Northern Rhodesia and Nyasaland as the Federation of Rhodesia and Nyasaland. Southern Rhodesia dominated the federation due to its relatively large white population and more sophisticated economy, but was unable to prevent the British government from dissolving the federation in 1963 due to the growth of African nationalist movements in Northern Rhodesia and Nyasaland. Both of these colonies achieved independence (as Zambia and Malawi respectively) with governments drawn from their black majority populations the next year.

From 1962 the Southern Rhodesian government was led by the Rhodesian Front political party, with Ian Smith serving as prime minister from 1964 until 1979. This party was deeply committed to maintaining the white minority's privileged status, and this motivated a decision to declare independence from the United Kingdom rather than submit to a transition to majority rule. Accordingly, the government issued Rhodesia's Unilateral Declaration of Independence (UDI) from the United Kingdom in November 1965, and the colony became Rhodesia. UDI was illegal under British law, and was regarded as such by almost all other countries and the United Nations. Britain and the United Nations Security Council imposed wide-ranging trade and other sanctions on Rhodesia with the objective of forcing it to return to its previous status. The scope of these sanctions was increased over time, and included prohibitions on support for the Rhodesian military. No country ever officially recognised Rhodesia's independence. South Africa and Portugal provided Rhodesia with assistance, and it was able to evade the sanctions and covertly trade with many countries. As a result, the Rhodesian economy grew strongly until at least 1974 and the government was able to import military equipment from several countries.

The Rhodesian Front's ideology held that the decolonisation of Africa and the development of African nationalism during the 1950s and 1960s had been the result of international communism aided by a policy of appeasement towards African nationalists by the United Kingdom and other Western countries. The party believed that Rhodesia needed to take a stand against the perceived communist threat to protect Western civilisation in Africa. The academic Michael Evans wrote in 2007 that "the Front's world-struggle ideology was based on a conspiratorial interpretation of modern politics that emphasised virulent forms of Anglophobia, (Note: Key members of the Rhodesian Front believed that the British government had, by endorsing the process of decolonisation, betrayed the white Rhodesians despite their sacrifice for the British cause in the world wars.) anti-communism, anti-internationalism, and anti-liberalism". He also noted that the party drew on the ideas and language used by the contemporary radical right movement in the United States to justify UDI. The historian Donal Lowry endorsed Evans' views in 2007, noting also that "the Rhodesia Front sought to combine the notion that Rhodesia embodied the best of true Britishness, the notion that white Rhodesians were 'the sort of people who once made the "Great" of Britain', while turning to America as the only remaining champion of the 'Free World' ". It took pains to not be seen as racially or politically extreme, and the party's rhetoric was focused on the need to combat the perceived communist threat rather than the goal of sustaining racial superiority.

Attracting white migrants was a key priority for the Southern Rhodesian and later Rhodesian governments from 1945 onwards. Maintaining a large flow of migrants was considered necessary to sustain the white minority's confidence in the future of Rhodesia, given the challenges the regime faced from African nationalism. The number of white people in Southern Rhodesia increased from 82,000 in 1946 to 250,000 in 1965 due almost entirely to immigration from mainly English-speaking countries. As a result, and unlike neighbouring South Africa whose white minority were mainly Afrikaners, white Southern Rhodesians predominately spoke English and their culture was similar to that of other English-speaking countries. The white population was always less than 5 per cent of Rhodesia's total population. Few of the white migrants to Rhodesia intended to settle permanently, with there being high rates of both immigration into and emigration from Rhodesia during most years of the country's existence. This meant that many members of the white population did not have strong feelings of loyalty towards Rhodesia as they had migrated there intending to take up specific opportunities before moving to another country.

=== Rhodesian Bush War ===
UDI and Rhodesia's racial inequalities led to the Rhodesian Bush War. The resistance to the Rhodesian regime was dominated by two African nationalist movements, the Zimbabwe African National Union (ZANU) and the Zimbabwe African People's Union (ZAPU). The ZANU was supported by China and the ZAPU by the Soviet Union, both of which were communist countries. The two movements espoused Marxist beliefs and were regarded as communists by the Rhodesian government. However, they and their guerrilla armies were motivated mainly by nationalism and a desire to end racially discriminatory practices through establishing majority rule in Rhodesia.

Guerrilla activities began in 1966, and mainly involved small groups operating in northern areas of Rhodesia. Until the early 1970s the Rhodesian Security Forces initially had little difficulty defeating the guerrillas. However Rhodesia's security situation deteriorated during the mid-1970s when the nationalists were able to establish bases in neighbouring Mozambique as Portuguese rule there faltered and finally ended in 1975. This led to a rapid growth in the insurgency which the security forces were unable to contain. The Rhodesians' counterinsurgency tactics involved coercing the black population, including through arbitrary arrests and the use of military force against civilians, rather than "winning their hearts and minds". This approach proved counter-productive, and increased support for the nationalists. The Rhodesian government agreed to an Internal Settlement with pro-Western African nationalist groups in March 1978; this led to the country being renamed Zimbabwe Rhodesia and the election of a government led by Bishop Abel Muzorewa's United African National Council in 1979 and other reforms. The Rhodesian Front continued to have a decisive influence on the government, and the war continued as the ZANU and ZAPU rejected the Internal Settlement. By mid-1979 the Zimbabwe Rhodesia government was facing defeat, and the war was costing 2,000 lives each month. The economy was shrinking, but not in danger of collapse, and South Africa was providing assistance worth at least 50 per cent of the Rhodesian defence budget. International pressure and a desire by all parties to end the fighting led to the Lancaster House Agreement, which was signed in December 1979. Under the terms of this agreement Rhodesia transitioned to majority rule and became independent as Zimbabwe in 1980.

There was considerable sympathy for Rhodesia and its war effort among conservatives in Western countries, and especially those who believed in white supremacy. These conservatives often saw UDI as a brave rebellion that sought to hold back what they saw as the harmful effects of rule by black people. The Rhodesian government's racial policies were perceived by many Western conservatives to be a form of well-meaning paternalism and meritocracy, and considered more acceptable than the apartheid system in South Africa. The cultural similarities between white Rhodesians and the citizens of other Anglosphere countries helped win support for the Rhodesian cause in countries such as Australia, the United Kingdom and United States, Rhodesia being seen as more akin to the West than South Africa. Rhodesia also attracted support from anti-communists, including many who were opposed to white supremacy. As the military situation for Rhodesia worsened over the 1970s, many believers in white supremacy in the West saw the white Rhodesians as martyrs.

=== Rhodesian Security Forces ===
The Rhodesian Security Forces were considerably expanded during the war. At the time of UDI, the Rhodesian Army had a strength of over 18,400, including 15,000 reservists, the Rhodesian Air Force had a small but modern fleet of combat aircraft and the paramilitary British South Africa Police (BSAP) included 7,000 full-time and 25,000 reserve personnel. The way in which the Army structured its branches into administrative corps was similar to that of the British Army, and many of its officers had received training in the United Kingdom. As the war continued, more army and police units were raised. In April 1979, 60,000 members of the military and police were on active duty to protect that month's Rhodesian general election.

The Rhodesian government had a strong preference for white military personnel. The Army's regular units, which were manned mainly by white soldiers who had volunteered or been conscripted and were liable for full-time service, were the most powerful element of the security forces. They included the Rhodesian Light Infantry (RLI), the Rhodesian Special Air Service (SAS) and the Armoured Car Regiment. The Rhodesian African Rifles and Selous Scouts were also regular units which mainly comprised black soldiers led by white officers. The regular units formed a strategic reserve that responded to the guerrilla activities. The Army also included the Rhodesia Regiment and Rhodesian Defence Regiment which were manned by white part-time reservists. As the war continued, increasing numbers of black soldiers were enlisted into the Army. The Guard Force (most of whose members were black) and the Security Force Auxiliaries, which were almost entirely manned by black personnel, augmented the Rhodesian Security Forces from 1975 and 1978 respectively but were not militarily effective.

The expansion of the security forces, increasing battle casualties and a decline in the white population due to high rates of emigration led to serious shortages of white personnel that greatly hindered the Rhodesian war effort. The Rhodesian government attempted several strategies to address these shortages. It sought to attract more white immigrants to the country, but from 1973 onwards the white population decreased. The number of white conscripts in the security forces was also increased by considerably expanding the age groups of men who were required to serve and the periods of active duty reservists needed to undertake.

Southern Rhodesia recruited police officers and soldiers from other African territories during the colonial period prior to UDI. In the world wars a high proportion of the black soldiers who served in Southern Rhodesian units were recruited from other territories. The Army appears to have largely stopped enlisting black foreign volunteers during the 1950s. The BSAP was primarily locally recruited from the 1940s onwards, but the paramilitary Police Support Unit was mainly made up of black men from other territories until the late 1960s. The numbers of black volunteers greatly decreased during the early 1960s as a result of their home territories achieving independence and the Southern Rhodesian government becoming increasingly white supremicist.

== Recruitment ==
The cover of a Rhodesian Army recruitment leaflet sent to British soldiers in 1976. Leaflets such as this contributed to British soldiers volunteering for the Rhodesian military.

=== Recruitment processes ===
Another strategy used to address white manpower shortages was seeking volunteers from outside the country, which the Rhodesian government began doing in 1973. Men with previous military experience, and especially service in wars, were preferred. The Rhodesian government expected that most of the volunteers would not settle in Rhodesia.

From the mid-1970s the Rhodesian government began placing advertisements seeking volunteers in international media. Due to the sanctions against Rhodesia, these ads were generally lodged via front organisations and were vague about the country the volunteers would serve in. The Rhodesian government openly advertised in the American Soldier of Fortune magazine during 1975. This magazine had been established that year to promote mercenary opportunities, and provided a positive portrayal of the lifestyle available to mercenaries. Its editor Robert K. Brown was a strong supporter of the white Rhodesian cause and wanted to encourage Americans to fight for Rhodesia. Advertisements were also placed in other American magazines, including Shotgun News and Shooting Times. Some ads described service in Rhodesia as "fun". The ads and other coverage of Rhodesia in Soldier of Fortune led to a "steady stream of volunteers".

The Rhodesian Security Forces' recruitment staff responded to people who wrote letters of inquiry after reading the advertisements. These letters were closely scrutinised, as many of the men who had written them were considered "obviously nuts" by the Rhodesian Army's recruitment officer Major Nick Lamprecht. Those who were considered potentially suitable were sent information packs, and asked to supply documentation to support their application; preference was given to applicants who provided notarized documents in their responses. Successful applicants were then offered a rank in the security forces. Until 1977, the Rhodesian government paid the airfares of volunteers who were unable to afford to travel. Other volunteers were expected to pay their own way. Most volunteers enlisted in the Rhodesian Army, but some joined the British South Africa Police.

As well as using advertisements, Rhodesian recruitment teams, including some led by Lamprecht, visited several countries. Rhodesian officers also sought to use their networks in other militaries to attract volunteers. Organisations representing veterans were another channel used to contact potential recruits. In 1976 some current and former British soldiers were sent unsolicited leaflets that encouraged them to enlist in the Rhodesian Army and explained its conditions of service. Rhodesian recruitment leaflets were also circulated within British Army barracks that year.

Several individuals and companies recruited United States citizens to fight in Rhodesia. They provided recruits for the security forces as well as for private industry, including farms, mines and timber companies. Some of the Americans volunteered to work as security guards on farms in Rhodesia as this offered the opportunity to fight communists while receiving higher pay than that offered by the security forces. News reports in the mid to late 1970s alleged that several individuals sought to recruit volunteers for Rhodesia in the United Kingdom and Europe, including by placing advertisements in newspapers and writing to former British military personnel. In January 1975 the Rhodesian Minister of Defence P. K. van der Byl denied that his government had anything to do with these efforts.

Most of the foreigners who volunteered to fight for Rhodesia did so individually. An exception was a group of almost 200 French military personnel who enlisted together in late 1976. Sources differ on whether these men were paratroopers or members of the French Foreign Legion. They were recruited by the Rhodesian Central Intelligence Organisation (CIO) from a French military base in Djibouti. The French troops were being withdrawn from Djibouti upon its independence, and French intelligence agents helped facilitate their recruitment by the Rhodesian Army. The CIO regarded this as a success, but all other elements of the Rhodesian government were sceptical. Small numbers of black ex-Flechas from Mozambique were also accepted after the end of Portuguese rule in that country; they were paid less than white soldiers.

The Rhodesian government did not accept all offers of volunteers. In 1976 former Portuguese officials offered 2,000 white soldiers who had served with the UNITA nationalist movement in Angola until that country's independence. This proposal was quickly dismissed as the Rhodesians did not see how they could arm or use large numbers of non-English speakers. A proposal by the mercenary Mike Hoare to establish an international brigade modelled on the French Foreign Legion was also rejected. In 1977 the pretender to the Albanian throne, Leka I, asked the Rhodesian government to train a battalion of Albanians that he hoped to recruit. He offered Rhodesia the services of these men after they completed training, though he intended to eventually use them to retake Albania. The Rhodesian government did not formally reply.

=== Volunteers' motivations ===
Several factors motivated foreigners to volunteer for the Rhodesian Security Forces. The academic historian Luise White wrote in 2004 that the volunteers were commonly opposed to the establishment of governments run by black people and did not have any particular commitment to Rhodesia itself. Kyle Burke noted in 2018 that American volunteers were at least partially motivated by racist and paternalistic views; some stated that sustaining white rule would lead to better outcomes for Rhodesia's black population. Anti-communism was also a key motivator, as many volunteers wanted to stop the spread of this ideology in Africa. Some American volunteers were attracted by a belief that the war in Rhodesia was comparable to that which had been fought on the American frontier. White observes that the volunteers were typically more willing to fight and even die for the Rhodesian Front's ideology than for Rhodesia itself. Economic factors, such as declining manufacturing and mining jobs and increasing unemployment in the United Kingdom and United States also influenced some of the volunteers; these men believed that the Rhodesian Security Forces offered better career prospects and job security than what was available in their home countries. Other volunteers enlisted seeking excitement and an adventure.

The Rhodesian Special Branch sought to vet all of the foreign volunteers for security risks. This proved impossible due to the large numbers and difficulty of checking their backgrounds. Some of the volunteers were later identified as agents of the United States Central Intelligence Agency. The British intelligence agencies also infiltrated agents into the Rhodesian Security Forces.

=== Numbers of volunteers ===
As historians have found it difficult to access Rhodesian records, it is not known exactly how many foreigners volunteered for the Rhodesian Security Forces. The high proportion of white Rhodesians who were born outside the country or held citizenship of another country also complicates the matter. As a result, there are a range of estimates of the numbers of foreigners who travelled to Rhodesia to serve with the security forces. White notes that it is unclear whether some of these estimates are for the entire Bush War, or only for a few years.

Several estimates were published during the war or as part of subsequent news reports. A British deserter from the Rhodesian military claimed in 1976 that 2,000 of the 6,000 regular soldiers in the Rhodesian Army were British and another 100 Americans. The American journalist Robin Wright and South African journalist Paul Smurthwaite have separately reported that there were 1,000 foreigners in the Rhodesian military. The filmmaker Michael Raeburn wrote in 1978 that there were between 1,500 and 2,000 foreign volunteers in Rhodesia. The British Foreign and Commonwealth Office (FCO) estimated in November 1978 that there were approximately 800 foreigners serving in Rhodesia, of whom around half were British and most of the others American.

Historians have provided a range of estimates. Peter Godwin and Ian Hancock wrote in 1993 that foreign volunteers represented only a "tiny minority" of the Rhodesian military in 1972, 90 per cent of recruits being Rhodesians and most of the remainder permanent residents of the country. The ethnographic and historical researcher Henrik Ellert noted in 1989 that there were 1,500 volunteers present in Rhodesia during 1977–1978. Military historians Paul L. Moorcraft and Peter McLaughlin stated as part of a 2010 work that the number was likely around 1,400, but have noted that estimates from other experts range as high as 2,000. Correlates of War project members Jeffrey S. Dixon and Meredith Reid Sarkees wrote in 2015 that the peak number of foreign volunteers was 1,500. Though not providing any estimates of his own, the historian Hugh Pattenden observed in 2021 that other historians' assessments show that the numbers of volunteers in Rhodesia increased during the 1970s and that Britons were a "significant minority within the Rhodesian military". The academics Jacob Ware and John Campbell stated in 2022 that people from more than fifteen countries had volunteered to fight for Rhodesia, including "several hundred" Americans.

Luise White has provided several estimates. She contended in 2004 that "the figure most sources cite is 1,500 foreign soldiers, of whom perhaps 400 were American", but noted that the Rhodesian Army put the number at 1,000 including 100 Americans. In 2021 White wrote that the numbers of foreign volunteers may have been small, and the ex-Rhodesian generals she had interviewed "scoffed at me when I asked if there were fifteen hundred foreigners in the Rhodesian Army". In this work she estimated that around 100 Americans served with the Rhodesian Security Forces between 1976 and 1980. White wrote that British citizens made up the majority of the foreign volunteers. Most of the other volunteers were from the United States, Australia, New Zealand and Europe. Many of the Europeans had previously served with the French Foreign Legion.

South Africans also took part in the war. Thousands of South African Police (SAP) and South African Defence Force (SADF) personnel were deployed to Rhodesia by the South African government to serve in or alongside the Rhodesian Security Forces. Elements of these deployments were covert. Some of the SAP officers who were integrated into the Rhodesian Security Forces were falsely portrayed as volunteers by the South African government. In 1979 the Zimbabwe Rhodesia government proposed that the SADF personnel who were attached to the country's security forces wear Zimbabwe Rhodesian uniforms. Some conscripted SADF personnel were posted to the Rhodesian Army and required to fight wearing Rhodesian uniforms. By the end of the war there were around 6,000 SADF personnel in Rhodesia. Some South Africans also travelled to Rhodesia independently to enlist in the Rhodesian Security Forces, motivated by ideological beliefs or a desire to experience combat. Other South Africans were conscripted into the Rhodesian Security Forces after they moved to the country to work in civilian occupations.

== Conditions and service ==
Foreign volunteers who were accepted were required to swear an oath of loyalty to Rhodesia, and the Rhodesian government considered them to be members of the security forces rather than mercenaries. They enlisted for a period of three years, which was the same as white Rhodesians who joined up on a full-time basis. The volunteers also received the same pay as white Rhodesians, between US$4,000 and $7,000 annually. These pay rates were lower than those in some other armies; for instance, they were around half the levels in the United States Army and between 50 and 60 per cent of the Australian Army's pay scale. Rhodesian recruiters told prospective Australian recruits that the cost of living was much lower in Rhodesia. Foreign volunteers were also offered land if they settled in Rhodesia after completing their service with the security forces.

All foreign volunteers were required to complete basic training upon arrival in Rhodesia, even if they had prior military experience. Those who failed this training had to leave the country; their airfare home was paid by the Rhodesian government. Foreign volunteers who openly expressed extreme racial views were deported. For instance, the American neo-Nazi Harold Covington claimed to have served in the Rhodesian Army before being deported due to his racism.

After completing training, many of the volunteers were assigned to the all-white RLI and particularly its 3 Commando sub-unit. In 1979, the military historian John Keegan noted that foreigners made up between a quarter and a third of the strength of the RLI. The historian Neil Grant gave a lower figure in 2015, stating that over 10 per cent of the unit were foreign volunteers. He also wrote that these men were from 38 nationalities. The RLI was a key element of Rhodesia's strategic reserve, and was frequently deployed against guerrilla forces. Other volunteers were posted to a range of units, including the Rhodesian Defence Regiment, protection companies mainly made up of black soldiers and the largely white Grey's Scouts and Rhodesian Armoured Corps. Most of the volunteers served under Rhodesian officers. Those who were combat veterans frequently resented being placed under the command of younger and less-experienced Rhodesians.

The volunteers typically found conditions in Rhodesia to be tough. Those who had joined up expecting a good lifestyle were rapidly disappointed. Many of the volunteers were frustrated that they were paid only in Rhodesian dollars, as foreign banks would not process this currency and the Rhodesian government allowed no more than R$1,500 to be converted to other currencies.

The large group of Frenchmen who enlisted together were used to form 7 Independent Company. This unit performed poorly, and committed atrocities during operations which included raping women. Most of its members left Rhodesia after the company was withdrawn from operations to be retrained, though some settled in Rhodesia. Two of the former French volunteers who remained in Zimbabwe after the war were sentenced to death for murdering a café owner during a robbery in 1982, and were executed the next year.

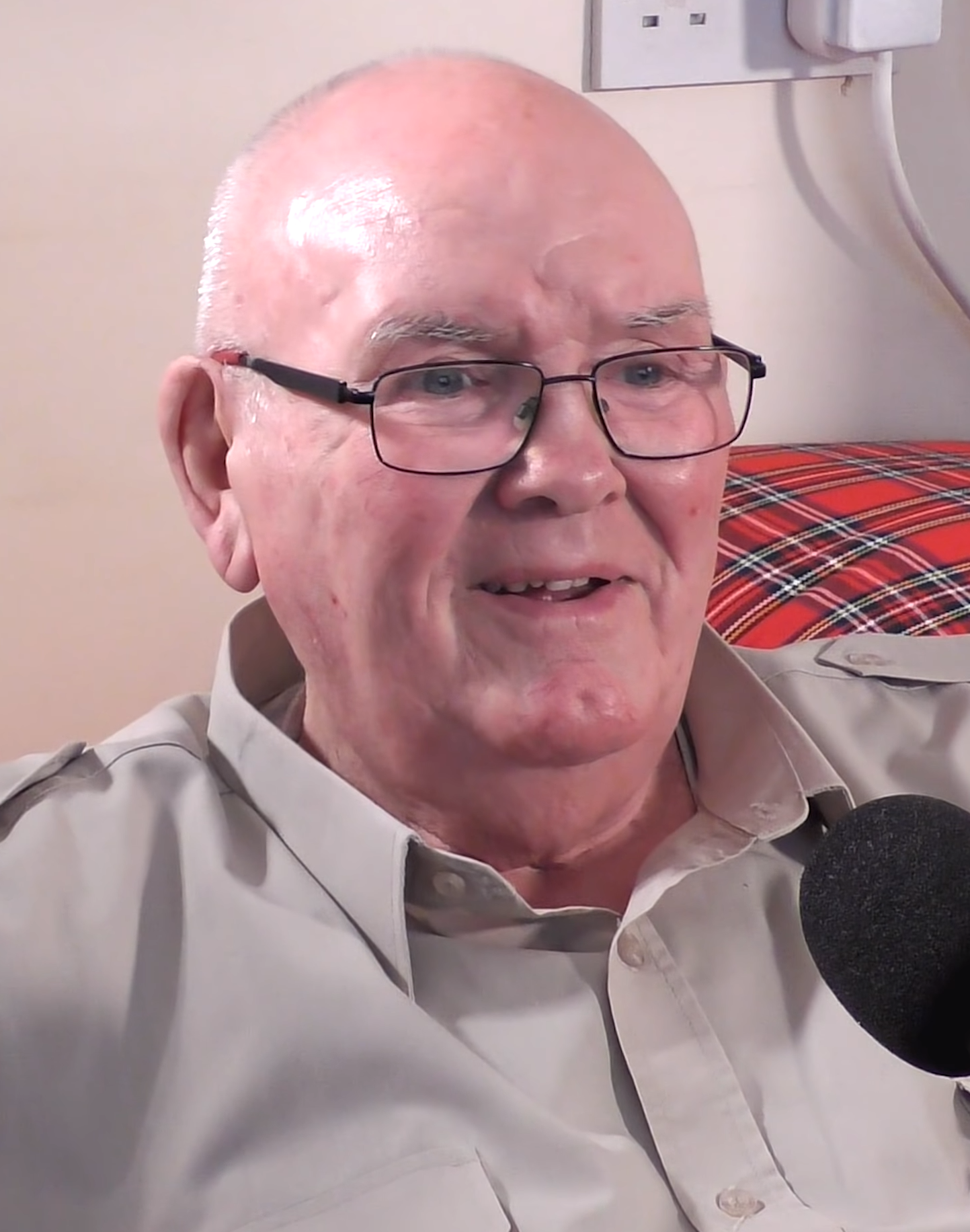
Peter McAleese photographed in 2021. He led British mercenaries in Angola and later served in the Rhodesian Army from 1976.

Despite the Rhodesian government's claim that it did not recruit mercenaries, the British mercenary Peter McAleese was accepted into the Rhodesian Army in early 1977. McAleese had previously served with the British Army's Parachute Regiment and Special Air Service, and also led a group of British mercenaries in Angola, and was posted to the elite Rhodesian Special Air Service after completing training. The Guardian reported in 1979 that "his presence is a source of embarrassment to the regime which has always insisted that it does not want foreign mercenaries". Several other men who had served with paramilitary forces in the Congo during the 1960s were also able to enlist to fight for Rhodesia.

A few black foreign volunteers fought in the Rhodesian Security Forces during the Bush War. They included men who had enlisted prior to UDI as well as volunteers who entered the country afterwards. Records of the number of foreign black volunteers are not available. The long-serving black volunteers who remained in the Rhodesian Security Forces following UDI often held important roles as trainers or non-commissioned officers.

In 1977 an Associated Press journalist reported that few foreign volunteers had been killed in Rhodesia. He attributed this to the Security Forces' low casualty rate at the time.

== Rhodesian responses ==
Despite its need for foreign volunteers, the Rhodesian government was uncomfortable with them. There were concerns that many of the volunteers were motivated more by a desire to fight in a war than a commitment to Rhodesia. The need for non-Rhodesians to sustain the country's independence was also considered problematic. The Rhodesian military rarely discussed the foreign volunteers with journalists and never released figures on the number who had enlisted.

The Rhodesian Army regarded the volunteers as disloyal and undisciplined. It accepted them largely due to necessity, and did not consider them to be more skilful than Rhodesian soldiers. Foreign volunteers typically received a hostile reception from their Rhodesian comrades as they were often regarded as adventurers with little commitment to the country.

American and Australian volunteers who had fought in the Vietnam War were generally well regarded by Rhodesian soldiers, and were often posted to the elite SAS and Selous Scouts. These volunteers may have encouraged the Rhodesian Security Forces to use the body count of guerrillas killed as a measure of success, this having been a key metric in Vietnam. The Rhodesian military also adopted some of the terminology and slang used by Americans in Vietnam, such as referring to guerrillas as "gooks" and labelling one of their supply lines the "Ho Chi Minh trail". It is not known how many Vietnam veterans fought in Rhodesia.

The Canadian spree killer Mathew Lamb was able to join the Rhodesian Army in 1974 after being released from a mental institution. He had previously been rejected by the Israel Defense Forces. The Rhodesian Army only learnt of Lamb's history after his death during an operation in 1976. The revelations about Lamb's history led to concerns in Rhodesia about the quality of the foreign volunteers.

== Nationalist and foreign responses ==
=== Nationalists ===
The nationalist armed groups that were fighting the Rhodesian regime, and many left-wing groups worldwide considered the volunteers to be mercenaries. White notes that this was "not because of how they were paid for fighting but because of why they were fighting", it being argued that the volunteers had involved themselves in a war that was not theirs. Opponents of the regime frequently highlighted the issue of "mercenaries" fighting for Rhodesia, and claimed that they were often mentally unstable and had little regard for civilian casualties. Rhodesia attempted to counter the mercenary claim by processing the volunteers through the Department of Immigration and framing them as prospective Rhodesian citizens, though few ever applied for citizenship.

The nationalists argued in their propaganda that the Rhodesian regime's need for foreign volunteers illustrated its political and military weaknesses. Both the main nationalist groups believed that the volunteers' presence indicated that Western governments supported the Rhodesian regime. The ZAPU argued that the failure of the British and US governments to stop the flow of volunteers was a barrier to reaching a negotiated settlement with the Rhodesian government, and demanded in 1977 that this be halted.

From the mid-1970s several African governments criticised Western governments, and especially Britain, for not stopping the flow of volunteers to Rhodesia. In 1977 the Organisation of African Unity (OAU) member countries adopted a Convention on Mercenaries that aimed to ban this form of military activity. The OAU Council of Ministers discussed the presence of mercenaries in Rhodesia and South West Africa (now Namibia) at its 1979 meeting, and issued a statement condemning "certain non-African states" for failing to prevent their citizens fighting for Rhodesia. Several African newspapers also published articles and editorials criticising Western governments over this issue; some of these articles included incorrect claims, such as assertions that planeloads of British volunteers were travelling to Rhodesia and that the British government was facilitating their recruitment. Many Africans believed that the inaction of the Western governments demonstrated their lack of commitment to combating white minority rule in Rhodesia and South Africa.

=== British government ===
The British government was opposed to its citizens fighting for Rhodesia. The sanctions it imposed following UDI banned efforts to entice British citizens to live or work in Rhodesia. British citizens were also prohibited from joining the Rhodesian Security Forces under the terms of an embargo enacted in 1968; those who did so potentially faced fines or imprisonment. The prohibition proved difficult to enforce, as it was not possible to prevent Britons leaving the country. It was also unclear whether serving in the Rhodesian military was illegal under laws that prohibited service in foreign militaries as the British did not recognise Rhodesia's independence. Several approaches were considered to develop legislation to ban recruitment by the Rhodesian Security Forces during the late 1970s, but none eventuated. The FCO advised anyone who sought information about fighting for Rhodesia that doing so was illegal, but did not explain why. The FCO asked the British military to warn servicemen against enlisting with the Rhodesian Security Forces. It declined to do so on the grounds that it was not illegal for British citizens to work as a mercenary. The military took steps to prevent material encouraging enlistment with Rhodesia from being circulated in its bases and service newspapers, however. Several Labour Party MPs raised concerns in Parliament and directly with the FCO about British citizens fighting for Rhodesia; no Conservative Party politicians raised similar concerns. Margaret Thatcher and several other prominent Conservative politicians had reservations about legislation that was proposed in 1976 to ban mercenary activity, on the grounds that it could prohibit British citizens from fighting for worthy causes.

In 1977 the British government provided a lukewarm response to an American proposal that the United Nations Security Council adopt a resolution requiring UN members to prevent their citizens from serving in the Rhodesian military. The British noted that such a resolution might prove impractical as many Rhodesians held dual citizenship. Due to the difficulty of drafting legislation that could effectively ban Britons from serving with Rhodesia or enforcing the measures that were brought in, there is no record of any British citizens being punished for serving with the Rhodesian Security Forces during the war. Those who did so received amnesties as part of the British government measures associated with the end of the conflict. Hugh Pattenden notes that although there was considerable support among British conservatives for Rhodesia, the relatively small numbers of volunteers from the country indicates that "very few men were actually willing to put their futures on the line for the Smith regime".

=== Other foreign governments ===
The United States Neutrality Act of 1794 prohibits American citizens from enlisting with foreign militaries or working as mercenaries for other governments. This law can only be enforced within the United States, meaning that American citizens who enlisted while overseas to fight for Rhodesia could not be prosecuted. The United States government made almost no effort to slow the flow of volunteers to Rhodesia. There is evidence that the Departments of Justice and State tacitly encouraged Americans to volunteer for Rhodesia as part of efforts to prevent the country collapsing before a negotiated solution to the war could be finalised. The Carter administration considered taking steps to stop Americans serving in Rhodesia, but no policy changes resulted. The American volunteers in Rhodesia were generally regarded in the United States as mercenaries. The activities of Americans in Rhodesia and elsewhere in southern Africa were widely publicised in the United States, leading to several investigations by the United States Congress between 1975 and 1980. Several civil society organisations were also established to campaign against Americans participating in mercenary activities. Many of the American volunteers in Rhodesia wrongly believed that their government opposed their presence in the country; articles in Soldier of Fortune and works by the author Robin Moore also claimed this.

The legality of volunteering for the Rhodesian Security Forces varied between other countries. Doing so was illegal under laws banning mercenary activity in Israel, West Germany, Switzerland and the Netherlands. The Australian parliament passed legislation in 1978, banning Australians from serving with Rhodesia. The Portuguese government banned Rhodesian recruitment in the late 1970s, but was unable to enforce the legislation. Canada had similar laws to the UK, and France and New Zealand were unable to prevent their citizens from travelling to Rhodesia to fight.

== Desertion by the volunteers ==
Many of the foreign volunteers deserted during their periods of enlistment. The difficult conditions in the security forces due to the war contributed to this; in 1979 a Soldier of Fortune writer claimed that approximately 80 per cent of the Americans who had volunteered for Rhodesia over the previous two years had deserted after finding the "routine too rough". Some other volunteers left due to the hostile reception they received from Rhodesians they served alongside. Foreign soldiers who served in the RLI complained about being treated poorly, and the desertion rate among foreigners in the SAS was particularly high.

A lack of commitment to the Rhodesian cause also contributed to desertions. Some American deserters decided that Rhodesia was doomed and not worth risking their lives for, including after they were made to feel unwelcome. An American volunteer deserted after five months in 1976 and considered joining the guerrillas after developing a belief that the Rhodesian Army was "completely racist". Several other volunteers left as they wanted to fight in more intense wars. Pattenden has observed that desertion was the most obvious downside the Rhodesian government faced from recruiting foreign volunteers, as they had "less stake in the future of Rhodesia than local whites".

== Removal of the volunteers ==
Many of the foreign volunteers opposed the March 1978 Internal Settlement, under which the white Rhodesian government agreed to cede power to moderate black leaders. These volunteers felt that Ian Smith had betrayed white Rhodesians by signing this agreement. They also feared for their lives due to a perception that a black majority government would place them on trial for murder and other crimes.

Under the terms of the 1979 Lancaster House Agreement that ended the war the British government resumed control over Rhodesia in December 1979, and the country temporarily reverted to the colony of Southern Rhodesia until elections could be held. On 21 December that year the UN Security Council adopted Resolution 460 that, among other things, called for the British authorities to expel all "mercenaries" and South African forces from Southern Rhodesia. The United Nations General Assembly had adopted a similar motion several days earlier at the behest of several countries in southern Africa. In January 1980 the British Lord Privy Seal, Ian Gilmour, stated that the British government had committed during the negotiations that led to the Lancaster House Agreement to not remove foreigners from the Rhodesian military before the election.

The ZANU won the February 1980 Southern Rhodesian general election. The new Prime Minister Robert Mugabe directed shortly after the election that "mercenaries" be dismissed as they were among the "irregular features of the present Army" and were "not needed". All other white military personnel, other than members of the Selous Scouts unit that had a reputation for atrocities, were given an assurance that they would not be required to leave the military. Like many white Rhodesian military personnel, some of the foreign volunteers moved to South Africa and served with the South African Defence Force.

== Literature and historiography ==
A range of works include positive portrayals of the foreign volunteers. Soldier of Fortune regularly covered foreigners in the Rhodesian Security Forces during the Bush War; each edition published between 1975 and 1980 included at least one article on the subject. These articles often highlighted the experiences of Americans who were fighting in Rhodesia. Soldier of Fortune's coverage reflected Rhodesian government propaganda, as its authors claimed that the country was a Western democracy and the war was being fought against communism. The articles on this topic also did not discuss the oppression of Rhodesia's black majority. Robin Moore included profiles of twelve volunteers as part of a non-fiction book he wrote in 1976 that argued that the Rhodesian government was not racist and sanctions against it should be lifted. He also wrote the novel Crippled Eagles which was based on the experiences of American volunteers. It was finished in 1980 and published in 1991. Stephen Jeffreys' 1980 play The Jubilee Too included a British volunteer who had returned from Rhodesia as one of its characters.

Few works by historians have been published on the volunteers who served with the Rhodesian Security Forces. As of 2021, the literature largely comprises brief discussions of the topic as part of books and academic journal articles on broader issues. Ware and Campbell wrote in 2022 that the foreign volunteers had little influence on the war. They observed that the volunteers "failed in their efforts to protect the white regime, but not before they supported and contributed to a conflict that lasted fifteen years and claimed tens of thousands of lives".

Modern white supremacist and far-right groups continue to provide a positive portrayal of white rule in Rhodesia. Ware and Campbell state that the foreign volunteers who fought for Rhodesia are celebrated by these groups. The academic Kyle Burke has also written that some anti-government paramilitary forces in the United States draw inspiration from the volunteers, and cite them as an example when encouraging violence against African Americans.

== See also ==
- List of foreign volunteers
- Mercenaries in Africa after 1960
