= Junction Gate =

Community in Manicaland, Zimbabwe

Coordinates: 20°10′S 32°47′E

Junction Gate is a small community in the province of Manicaland, Zimbabwe located 6 km west from the Mozambique border and about 20 km east of Chipinge. There is a school called Junction Gate Primary School. The school's motto is "It's the little things we do that make us big" The school is next to a Tanganda Tea Estate farm called Petronella popularly known as Mabheka. Tanganda Tea Estates built a Tea Processing Factory adjacent to the school around 1999 called Tingamira and a dam that is supplied by two small rivers, Chipita and Pondabuwe. It then went on to start a bottled still water brand named after the dam, Tingamira Still Water.

At Junction Gate, there is also a clinic and a police station.
