= Jason Sparrow =

Zimbabwean cricketer (born 1974)

Personal information
- Full name: Jason Wayne Sparrow
- Born: 7 February 1974 (age 52); Chipinge, Manicaland, Rhodesia
- Batting: Right-handed
- Bowling: Right-arm medium

Domestic team information
- Years: Team
- 1999/2000: Manicaland

Career statistics
Competition	FC
Matches	3
Runs scored	2
Batting average	1.00
100s/50s	0/0
Top score	2
Balls bowled	144
Wickets	0
Bowling average	–
5 wickets in innings	–
10 wickets in match	–
Best bowling	–
Catches/stumpings	2/–
- Source: ESPNcricinfo, 15 July 2021

Jason Wayne Sparrow (born 7 February 1974) is a former Zimbabwean cricketer. Born in Chipinge, he played three first-class matches for his home province Manicaland during the 1999–2000 Logan Cup.
