= Security Advisory Services =

- Company type: Private military security firm
- Industry: Private military and security contractor
- Founded: 1975
- Founder: Leslie Aspin, John Banks, Frank Perren
- Headquarters: United Kingdom, Sandhurst
- Area served: Africa (Southern Rhodesia, Angola)
- Key people: Leslie Aspin, John Banks, Frank Perren
- Products: Providing military combat forces
- Services: Mercenary recruitment

Security Advisory Services was a British private military company founded by Leslie Aspin, an arms dealer, John Banks, a former paratrooper of the British Army, and Frank Perren, a former Royal Marine, in order to recruit mercenaries for military operations abroad. In 1976, the company massively hired paid soldiers to fight in the Angolan Civil War, which was the biggest mercenary recruitment operation in Britain since the Nigerian Civil War at the end of the 1960s.

== History ==
=== Background ===
Starting from the 1960s, a number of British private companies were established by ex-officers of the Special Air Service(SAS) and Special Branch, forming an undercover network for the employment of former servicemen as armed bodyguards, members of assassination teams, and soldiers of private armies overseas. Some of those companies overtly advertised their security-related services (such as Saladin Security Ltd and Thor Security Systems Ltd), some had confusing names (such as Keenie Meenie Services Ltd), and some even operated as insurance or consulting firms (such as Thomas Nelson (Insurance) Ltd and Control Risks Ltd).

In 1967, the founder of SAS David Stirling set up the Watchguard International Ltd, with the official mission of supplying bodyguards to heads of states in Africa and the Middle East. Its actual activity, however, extended to providing forces for secret military operations and training guerilla fighters. One of the Watchguard's employees was a former paratrooper John Banks.

=== Formation ===
In the summer of 1975, John Banks published the following advertisement in a newspaper:

Ex-commandos, paratroopers, S.A.S. troopers wanted for interesting work abroad.

He opened an office of the Security Advisory Services in Sandhurst and planned to recruit mercenaries for the war in Southern Rhodesia. The recruitment was not successful, but Banks managed to gather information about those willing to fight abroad.

=== War in Angola ===
In November 1975, Norman Hall, a former paratrooper and assistant to the head of the National Liberation Front of Angola (FNLA) Holden Roberto, arrived in Britain. Hall brought $25,000 to the Security Advisory Services asking for help in recruiting mercenaries to support FNLA in the Angolan Civil War. Later on, the company also received $84,000 from Terence Haig, another aide of Roberto.

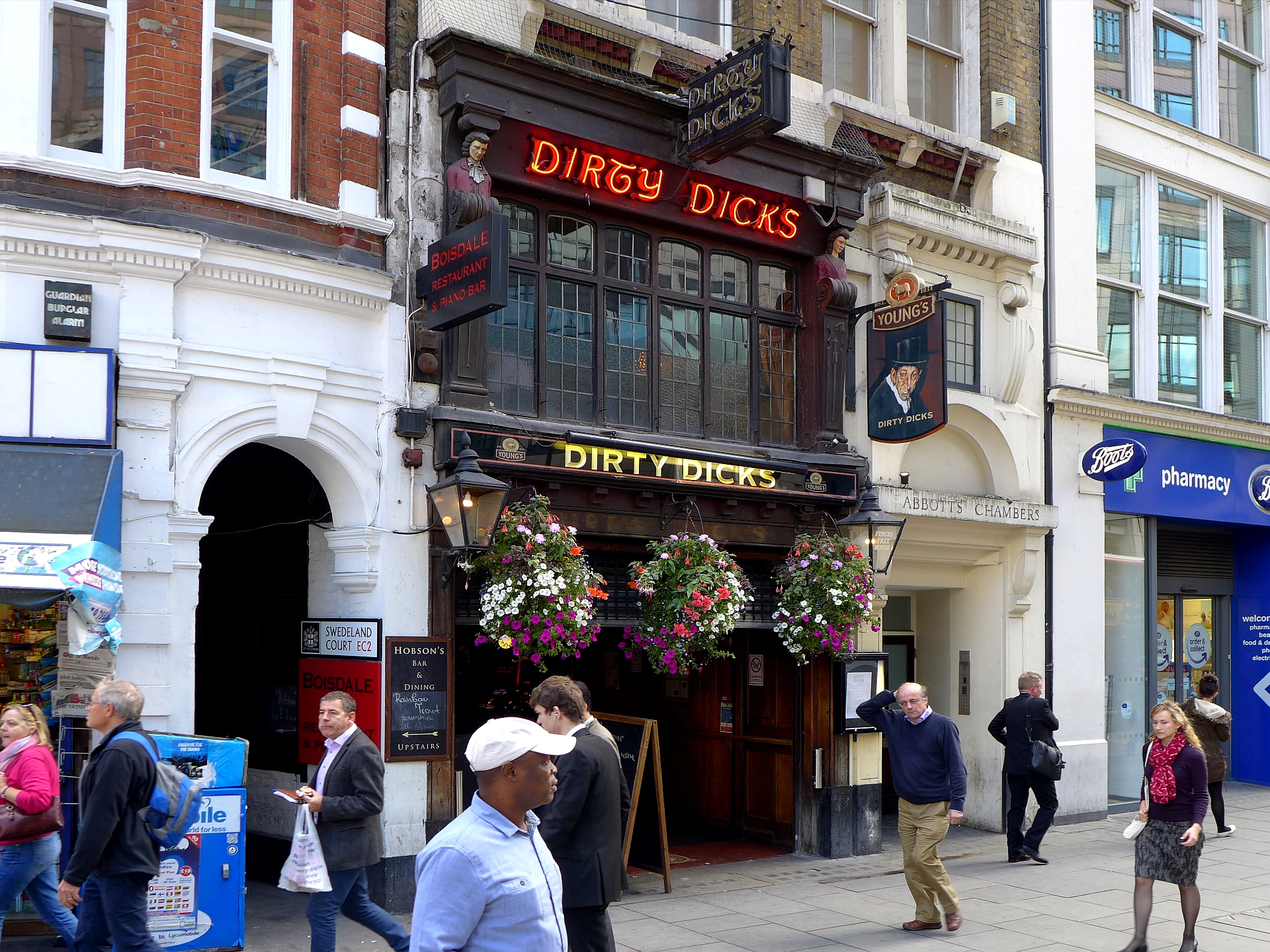
Dirty Dick's pub, where mercenaries gathered before going to the war in Angola

Apart from placing advertisement in newspapers, John Banks recruited paid soldiers in pubs of London. Before their departure to Angola, mercenaries gathered in the pub Dirty Dick's and stayed overnight in the St George in the East church in London. By various estimates, from 90 to 200 soldiers were sent to Angola by the Security Advisory Services. John Banks accompanied a group of mercenaries departing from Heathrow Airport to Brussels, from where they flew on a charter flight to Kinshasa, the capital of the Angola's neighbor Zaire, without Banks. Another group flew to Antwerp, where they took a charter flight to Zaire.

Security Advisory Services made 6-month contracts with mercenaries and paid for their transportation. According to John Banks, the company offered them $300 a week and promised them $10,000 as a reward for any Russian captured. (Note: FNLA, reinforced by British mercenaries, fought against the Cuban and Soviet-backed MPLA) Some of the mercenaries were only 17 years old, without any military training and without proper equipment. According to Ben Hills, a reporter for the Australian newspaper The Age, 59 paid soldiers were killed in Angola. Four captured mercenaries were sentenced to death (among them three British citizens) and nine to long-term imprisonment during the Luanda Trial.

== See also ==
- UN Mercenary Convention
- Unlawful combatant
- Arms trade
