= Tongogara Refugee Camp =

Tongogara Refugee Camp is a refugee camp located near Chipinge, Zimbabwe, about 420 km southeast of Harare. It was established in 1984 after Zimbabwe had become independent from Great Britain, and took in refugees from Mozambique who were fleeing from the war between the government and the Mozambican National Resistance Movement (RENAMO). It is estimated that as many as 58,000 refugees had occupied the camp in 1994. After 1995, many of its members returned to Mozambique, and the camp closed; however, it reopened in 1998 to accommodate refugees from other African countries as well as Europe and Asia. In 2017, the population of the camp was about 10,000. The camp has been supported by United Nations High Commissioner for Refugees (UNHCR) for housing and clothing, and by United Nations World Food Program (WFP) for money and food, UNICEF for hygiene and sanitation, and other organizations such as Terre des hommes in Italy for health care and education. Geographical coordinates -20.349785, 32.309918.

== Population ==
In the early 1990s, it was estimated about 60,000 people resided at the camp. In 2007, the populace was about 2,673. In 2010, about 3,200 people were housed at the camp. In 2017, it was estimated that about 8,982 of the 10,563 refugees to Zimbabwe have resided at the camp, with 6,713 from Democratic Republic of Congo, and 842 from Mozambique. Other countries include Burundi, Rwanda, Somalia, Ivory Coast, Mali, Ethiopia, Eritrea, Sudan, Syria, Kenya and South Africa.

== Education ==
=== Tongogara Primary School ===
Tongogara Primary School was established within the camp, and in 2017, the school had 1,694 students. It is also home to a secondary school.

Tongogara Primary School is a primary school in the Tongogara Refugee Camp in Zimbabwe. The school is situated 18km along the dusty road which stretches from the Harare-Mutoko road. It is one of the few schools to have a bigger captivity of more than 5km in the recently resettlement areas of Hoyuyu in Mutoko District. The other neighbouring schools are Kushinga Secondary and Primary School and Nzira Secondary and Primary School (at Jani Growth Point, which is 27km South east of Mutoko Town).

This school was opened in 1970 when local residence placed a complaint to the Mutoko District council for being too relaxed in building more schools in Hoyuyu. Children as far as 15km were struggling to travel the long distances to nearby Jekwa Primary and Secondary school.

As of 2017, the school had about 1,700 students. It is reportedly suffering from a significant shortage of both teachers and supplies. The school educate students up to the seventh grade and is also a registered ZIMSEC primary examination center having more than 200 students siting for seventh grade final exams each year.

The school consist of 14 blocks each having 4 classrooms. 1 of these blocks is used as Science laboratories for chemical, physics and biology lessons. The other room is used as a computer laboratory. The school also has a well developed sport infrastructure, an artificial football pitch, basketball court, tennis court, swimming pool, gymnasium, volleyball court etc. The school won 3 consecutive achievements from 2016 for the best infrastructure development in Mutoko District.

=== Transformation Innovation Hub ===
The Transformation Innovation Hub (TIH) was created in 2020, by Evode Havyarimana Hakizimana and Kesiya Stamili Ramazani. TIH is a part of the Social Innovation Academy (SINA), which is a model that empowers young refugees through self-innovative exploration to create their own social enterprise. TIH has already assisted in the creation of 9 companies.
