= Chipinge Airport =

Airport in Manicaland, Zimbabwe

- IATA: CHJ; ICAO: FVCH

Summary
- Airport type: Public
- Serves: Chipinge
- Elevation AMSL: 3,700 ft / 1,128 m
- Coordinates: 20°12′25″S 32°37′45″E

Map
- Location of the airport in Zimbabwe

Runways
Direction	Length		Surface
Direction	m	ft	Surface
12/30	1,095	3,593	Grass
- Sources: WAD Google Maps GCM

Chipinge Airport (IATA: CHJ), designated as Forward Air Field 6 (FAF) during the Rhodesian Bush War, is an airport serving Chipinge, Manicaland Province, Zimbabwe.

== History ==
Chipinge Airport was established in c1976 as a forward air field by the Rhodesian Air Force (RhAF). It was also known as Chipinda Pools, and was used by RhAF helicopters to conduct counter-operations in Mozambique in September 1979.

== See also ==
- Transport in Zimbabwe
- List of airports in Zimbabwe
