= Chipinge =

Chipinge Chipinga
- Location within Zimbabwe
- Coordinates: 20°12′00″S 32°37′12″E
- Country: Zimbabwe
- Province: Manicaland Province
- District: Chipinge District
- City: Chipinge Municipality
- Elevation: 1,132 m (3,714 ft)

Population (2022 census)
  - Total: 34,959
- Time zone: UTC+2 (CAT)
- Climate: Cwb

Chipinge, formerly known as Chipinga, is a town in Zimbabwe, located in Chipinge District, in Manicaland Province, in southeastern Zimbabwe, close to the border with Mozambique.

== Location ==
The town lies approximately 170 kilometres (110 mi), by road, south of Mutare, the nearest large city. This location lies about 230 kilometres (140 mi), by road, east of Masvingo, on the road (Highway A-9) to Bulawayo, Zimbabwe's second-largest city, approximately 290 kilometres (180 mi), further west of Masvingo. The coordinates of the town are: 20° 12' 0.00"S, 32° 37' 12.00"E (Latitude:20.2000; Longitude:32.6200). Chipinge sits at an elevation of 1,132 metres (3,714 ft), above sea level.

== Overview ==
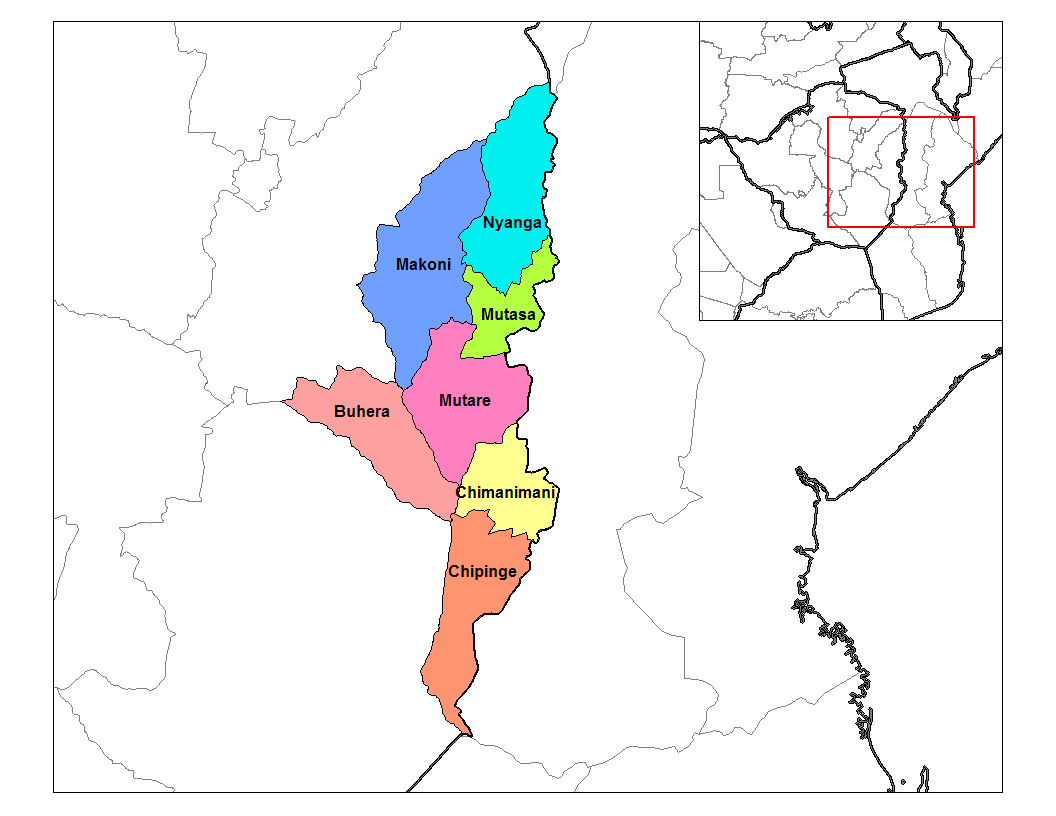
A map of the districts of Manicaland Province

The average annual rainfall in Chipinge is about 1,105 millimetres (43.5 in). The warm climate and high rainfall are well suited to agriculture. The local farmers grow tea, coffee, macadamia nuts and rear dairy cattle. The surrounding mountain slopes are covered with pine and acacia plantations. One of Zimbabwe's most famous landmarks, the Birchenough Bridge is located on the Sabi River about 50 kilometres (31 mi), northwest of Chipinge.

The town is the headquarters of Chipinge District and contain the main offices of Chipinge District Administration and the offices of Chipinge Town Council. Royal Bank Zimbabwe, a commercial bank, maintains a branch in the town. Chipinge is also served by Chipinge Airport, Telone Exchange telecommunications.

Chipinge is divided into five constituencies for election purposes: Chipinge Central, Chipinge North, Chipinge South, Chipinge East and Musikavanhu.

== History ==
The town was formerly known as Chipinga. A white settlement began here with the arrival of Thomas Moodie's trek in 1893 and was called South Melsetter. Melsetter was his family home in Orkney, Scotland. In 1903 a police outpost was built here and in 1909 a school was built. The settlement was renamed Chipinga after a local chief in 1907 and in 1946 Chipinga received town status. Dairy farming was established early in the 1900s and by 1931 there were two cheese factories in operation. In 1945 a third cheese factory was open in the town but the same year saw the three factories being amalgamated to form one large factory. Cheese production at this facility continued until 1976. In 1983 Dairibord Zimbabwe under Dairibord Holdings opened a dairy factory making sterilized milk "steri" at 323 Ferreira Street. The area around Chipinge was the first place to grow tea in Zimbabwe, when Grafton and Florence Phillips smuggled seeds from Assam in British India in 1924, while coffee was introduced on a small scale but was not successful until 1950 when a coffee experimental station was established.

== Population ==
According to the 1992 Population Census, the town has a population of 11,582. In 2004, the town's population was estimated at 18,860. The results of the 2012 census indicate 25,675 residents in Chipinge Town.

== Climate ==
Climate data for Chipinge (1961–1990, extremes 1932–present)
Month	Jan	Feb	Mar	Apr	May	Jun	Jul	Aug	Sep	Oct	Nov	Dec	Year
Record high °C (°F)	37.8 (100.0)	35.6 (96.1)	34.3 (93.7)	36.0 (96.8)	32.7 (90.9)	29.7 (85.5)	34.9 (94.8)	33.5 (92.3)	38.0 (100.4)	38.4 (101.1)	36.6 (97.9)	34.1 (93.4)	38.4 (101.1)
Mean daily maximum °C (°F)	26.0 (78.8)	25.5 (77.9)	25.2 (77.4)	24.1 (75.4)	22.6 (72.7)	20.4 (68.7)	20.2 (68.4)	22.2 (72.0)	24.8 (76.6)	26.1 (79.0)	26.3 (79.3)	26.0 (78.8)	24.1 (75.4)
Daily mean °C (°F)	20.9 (69.6)	20.5 (68.9)	19.8 (67.6)	18.2 (64.8)	16.3 (61.3)	14.4 (57.9)	14.2 (57.6)	15.8 (60.4)	18.1 (64.6)	19.4 (66.9)	20.3 (68.5)	20.5 (68.9)	18.2 (64.8)
Mean daily minimum °C (°F)	16.9 (62.4)	16.7 (62.1)	15.9 (60.6)	14.3 (57.7)	12.3 (54.1)	10.3 (50.5)	9.8 (49.6)	10.7 (51.3)	12.7 (54.9)	14.2 (57.6)	15.6 (60.1)	16.4 (61.5)	13.8 (56.8)
Record low °C (°F)	11.0 (51.8)	11.8 (53.2)	9.9 (49.8)	5.8 (42.4)	4.0 (39.2)	2.4 (36.3)	0.6 (33.1)	2.2 (36.0)	3.8 (38.8)	5.3 (41.5)	7.2 (45.0)	10.0 (50.0)	0.6 (33.1)
Average rainfall mm (inches)	208.5 (8.21)	204.1 (8.04)	142.5 (5.61)	61.9 (2.44)	31.3 (1.23)	16.7 (0.66)	19.9 (0.78)	20.6 (0.81)	26.1 (1.03)	53.0 (2.09)	103.0 (4.06)	209.9 (8.26)	1,097.5 (43.21)
Average rainy days	12	12	10	5	4	4	3	4	4	6	9	11	84
Average relative humidity (%)	81	83	82	80	73	70	68	67	63	69	75	79	74
Mean monthly sunshine hours	235.6	196.0	226.3	234.0	254.2	234.0	251.1	269.7	261.0	248.0	228.0	210.8	2,848.7
Mean daily sunshine hours	7.6	7.0	7.3	7.8	8.2	7.8	8.1	8.7	8.7	8.0	7.6	6.8	7.8
Source 1: World Meteorological Organization, NOAA (sun and mean temperature, 1961–1990)
Source 2: Deutscher Wetterdienst (humidity), Meteo Climat (record highs and lows)

== Notable people ==
- Ndabaningi Sithole, ZANU – Ndonga political leader
- Guy Whittall, Zimbabwean cricketer
- Arthur Mutambara, politician
- Lovemore Madhuku, politician
- Jason Sparrow, cricketer

== See also ==
- Districts of Zimbabwe
- Provinces of Zimbabwe
- Tongogara Refugee Camp, a refugee camp near Chipinge
