= Keenie Meenie Services =

Private military contractor

Keenie Meenie Services (or KMS Ltd) was a British private military contractor set up by former Special Air Service (SAS) officers in 1975. It operated as a mercenary force in countries where the United Kingdom had political interests, such as Oman, Uganda, Afghanistan and Sri Lanka.

== History ==
The spelling of Keenie Meenie varied, such as, 'Kini Mini', 'Keeny Meeny', and other iterations. Ken Connor, writing in Ghost Force: The Secret History of the SAS, stated that KMS "took its name from the Swahili word for the movement of a snake through grass". The company's name has also been attributed to SAS slang for covert operations.

KMS was founded in 1975 by Brigadier Mike Wingate Gray, Colonel Jim Johnson, Major David Walker, and Major Andrew Nightingale, when it started guarding British diplomats to Argentina in the wake of a bombing of the home of the British ambassador in Buenos Aires. It operated out of a building on Abingdon Road in Kensington, London.

Phil Miller's book Keenie Meenie: The British Mercenaries Who Got Away with War Crimes, drawing on declassified UK government documents, suggests that despite efforts to rein in the use of mercenaries by the government of Harold Wilson in 1976, KMS had sufficiently good connections to government departments in Whitehall that they were able to ignore these efforts. Miller's research claims that KMS went on to commit war crimes in Sri Lanka and Nicaragua.

During the Soviet–Afghan War KMS under authority from the British government was active in training small Afghan commando units from 1983 and continued for another four years mostly operating outside of Afghanistan in places such Oman and Saudi Arabia.

In 1984, KMS began training the Special Task Force (STF) of the Sri Lanka Police in its civil war with Tamil separatist group, the Liberation Tigers of Tamil Eelam (LTTE or Tamil Tigers). The Tamil Guardian reported in 2001 that the STF went on to commit torture and summary executions of civilians. The report also states that KMS personnel quit their lucrative contracts in Sri Lanka because STF personnel were "out of control". The UK Foreign Office did not want to officially send military aid to Sri Lanka during its war with the Tamil Tigers for fear of jeopardising commercial and trade relations with India. Later, they helped Indian forces that battled with LTTE, particularly providing air cover.

In 1987, the exposure of the Iran-Contra Affair revealed that KMS "was part of a private network that assisted Nicaraguan insurgents". In the mid 80s, KMS had also been given a US military contract to help train Afghan rebels in sabotage in their insurgency against occupying Soviet forces. John Cooley's 2002 book, Unholy Wars, stated that "It was indeed KMS ... to which the main British role in training holy warrior cadre for the Afghan jihad seems to have fallen." KMS remained in contact with the CIA about training Afghan rebels until at least 1987.

Although KMS closed down in the early 1990s, a subsidiary company, Saladin Security Ltd, has continued to operate in Afghanistan, where it was hired by the Canadian government in Kabul. The company openly stated that "Saladin with its predecessor KMS Ltd., has provided security services since 1975".
