= Mercenary =

Soldier who fights for hire

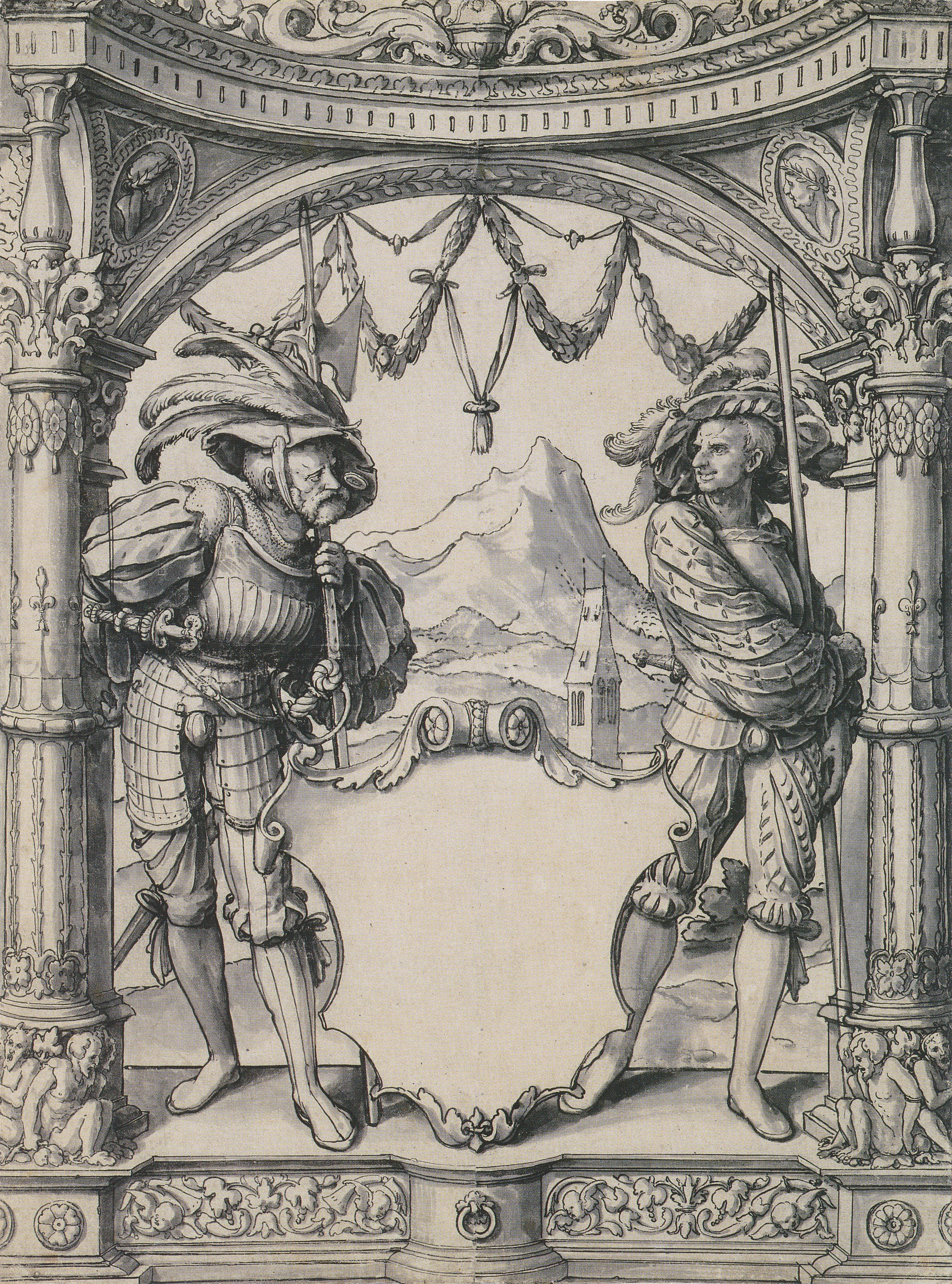
c. 1525 engraving of two Swiss mercenaries

A mercenary (/ˈmɜːr.sə.nɛr.i/, MUR-sə-nerr-ee), merc (/mɜːk/ or /mɜːrk/), or soldier of fortune is a private individual who joins an armed conflict for personal profit, is otherwise an outsider to the conflict, and is not a member of any other official military. Mercenaries fight for money or other forms of payment rather than for political interests.

Beginning in the 20th century, mercenaries have increasingly come to be seen as less entitled to protection by rules of war than non-mercenaries. The Geneva Conventions declare that mercenaries are not recognized as legitimate combatants and do not have to be granted the same legal protections as captured service personnel of the armed forces. In practice, whether or not a person is a mercenary may be a matter of degree, as financial and political interests may overlap.

== International and national laws of war ==
Protocol Additional GC 1977 (APGC77) is a 1977 amendment protocol to the Geneva Conventions. Article 47 of the protocol provides the most widely accepted international definition of a mercenary, though it is not endorsed by some countries, including the United States. The Protocol Additional to the Geneva Conventions of 12 August 1949, and relating to the Protection of Victims of International Armed Conflicts (Protocol I), 8 June 1977 states:

Art 47. Mercenaries

1. A mercenary shall not have the right to be a combatant or a prisoner of war.
2. A mercenary is any person who:
  - (a) is especially recruited locally or abroad in order to fight in an armed conflict;
  - (b) does, in fact, take a direct part in the hostilities;
  - (c) is motivated to take part in the hostilities essentially by the desire for private gain and, in fact, is promised, by or on behalf of a Party to the conflict, material compensation substantially in excess of that promised or paid to combatants of similar ranks and functions in the armed forces of that Party;
  - (d) is neither a national of a Party to the conflict nor a resident of territory controlled by a Party to the conflict;
  - (e) is not a member of the armed forces of a Party to the conflict; and
  - (f) has not been sent by a State which is not a Party to the conflict on official duty as a member of its armed forces.

All the criteria, as listed in 2(a) through 2(f), must be met, according to the Geneva Convention, for a combatant to be considered a mercenary. While mercenaries do not enjoy the same protection as prisoners of war do, they must still be treated humanely according to the rules of the Protocol and they may not be punished without a trial.

On 4 December 1989, the United Nations passed resolution 44/34, the International Convention against the Recruitment, Use, Financing and Training of Mercenaries. It entered into force on 20 October 2001 and is usually known as the UN Mercenary Convention. Article 1 of the UN Mercenary Convention contains the definition of a mercenary. Article 1.1 is similar to Article 47 of Protocol I. Article 1.2 broadens the definition to include a non-national recruited to overthrow a "Government or otherwise undermin[e] the constitutional order of a State; or Undermin[e] the territorial integrity of a State"; and "Is motivated to take part therein essentially by the desire for significant private gain and is prompted by the promise or payment of material compensation". Under Article 1.2, a person does not have to take a direct part in the hostilities in a planned coup d'état to be a mercenary.

=== Austria ===
If a person is proven to have worked as a mercenary for any other country while retaining Austrian citizenship, their Austrian citizenship will be revoked.

=== France ===
In 2003, France criminalized mercenary activities, as defined by the protocol to the Geneva convention for French citizens, permanent residents, and legal entities (Penal Code, L436-1, L436-2, L436-3, L436-4, L436-5). This law does not prevent French citizens from serving as volunteers in foreign forces. The law applies to military activities with a specifically mercenary motive or with a mercenary level of remuneration. However, due to jurisdictional loopholes several French companies provide mercenary services.

The French state owns 50% of Défense Conseil International, which it founded, a private military company (PMC) which does not supply any fighters but is used to export military training services. It realised a profit of €222 million in 2019.

=== Germany ===
It is an offence "to recruit" German citizens "for military duty in a military or military-like facility in support of a foreign power" (§109h StGB). Furthermore, a German citizen who enlists in the armed forces of a state they are also a citizen of risks the loss of their citizenship (§28 StAG).

=== South Africa ===
In 1998, South Africa passed the Foreign Military Assistance Act that banned citizens and residents from any involvement in foreign wars, except for humanitarian operations, unless a government committee approved deployment. In 2005, the legislation was reviewed by the government because:

- South African citizens were working as security guards in Iraq during the American occupation of Iraq;
- consequences of the mercenary soldier sponsorship case against Mark Thatcher for the "possible funding and logistical assistance in relation to an alleged attempted coup in Equatorial Guinea" organized by Simon Mann.

As of 2010, South Africa forbids citizens from fighting in foreign wars unless they are under the direct control of their own national armed forces.

=== United Kingdom ===
In the United Kingdom, the Foreign Enlistment Act 1819 and the Foreign Enlistment Act 1870 make it unlawful for British subjects to join the armed forces of any state warring with another state at peace with Britain. During the Greek War of Independence, British volunteers fought with the Greek rebels, which could have been unlawful per the Foreign Enlistment Act. It was unclear whether or not the Greek rebels constituted a 'state', but the law was later clarified to indicate that they were.

The British government considered using the Act against British subjects fighting for the International Brigades in the Spanish Civil War and the FNLA in the Angolan Civil War, but on both occasions chose not to do so.

=== United States ===
Civilians with the US Armed Forces lose their law of war protection from direct attack if, and for such time as, they directly participate in hostilities.

The Anti-Pinkerton Act of 1893 (5 U.S.C. § 3108) forbids the US government from using Pinkerton National Detective Agency employees or similar private police companies.

In 1977, the United States Court of Appeals for the Fifth Circuit interpreted the Anti-Pinkerton Act as forbidding the US government from employing companies offering "mercenary, quasi-military forces" for hire (United States ex rel. Weinberger v. Equifax, 557 F.2d 456, 462 (5th Cir. 1977), cert. denied, 434 U.S. 1035 (1978)). There is disagreement over whether this proscription is limited to strikebreakers only, because Weinberger v. Equifax states the following:

The purpose of the Act and the legislative history reveal that an organization was "similar" to the Pinkerton Detective Agency only if it offered for hire mercenary, quasi-military forces as strikebreakers and armed guards. It had the secondary effect of deterring any other organization from providing such services lest it be branded a "similar organization." The legislative history supports this view and no other.

— United States Court of Appeals for the Fifth Circuit, Weinberger v. Equifax, 1977

In the 7 June 1978 letter to the heads of Federal Departments and Agencies, the Comptroller General interpreted this decision in a way that carved out an exemption for "Guard and Protective Services".

A United States Department of Defense (DoD) interim rule revised DoD Instruction 3020.41 to authorize contractors, other than private security contractors, to use deadly force against enemy armed forces only in self-defense (71 Fed. Reg. 34826), effective 16 June 2006. Per that interim rule, private security contractors were authorized to use deadly force when protecting their client's assets and persons, consistent with their contract's mission statement. One interpretation is that this authorized contractors to engage in combat on behalf of the US government. It is the combatant commander's responsibility to ensure that private security contract mission statements do not authorize performance of inherently governmental military functions, i.e. preemptive attacks, assaults, or raids, etc.

On 18 August 2006, the US Comptroller General rejected bid protest arguments that the United States Army contracts violated the Anti-Pinkerton Act by requiring that contractors provide armed convoy escort vehicles and labor, weapons, and equipment for internal security operations at Victory Base Complex in Iraq. The Comptroller General reasoned the act was unviolated because the contracts did not require contractors to provide quasi-military forces as strikebreakers.

In 2007, the US Army was temporarily barred from awarding a $475 million security contract in Iraq, the largest one at that time, because of a lawsuit filed by a US citizen alleging violation of the Anti-Pinkerton Act of 1893. Three of the candidates under final consideration for the contract (to include intelligence services and security for reconstruction work by the United States Army Corps of Engineers) included British firms Aegis Defence Services and Erinys Iraq, as well as Blackwater of North Carolina. The case was later dismissed.

== Foreign national servicemen ==
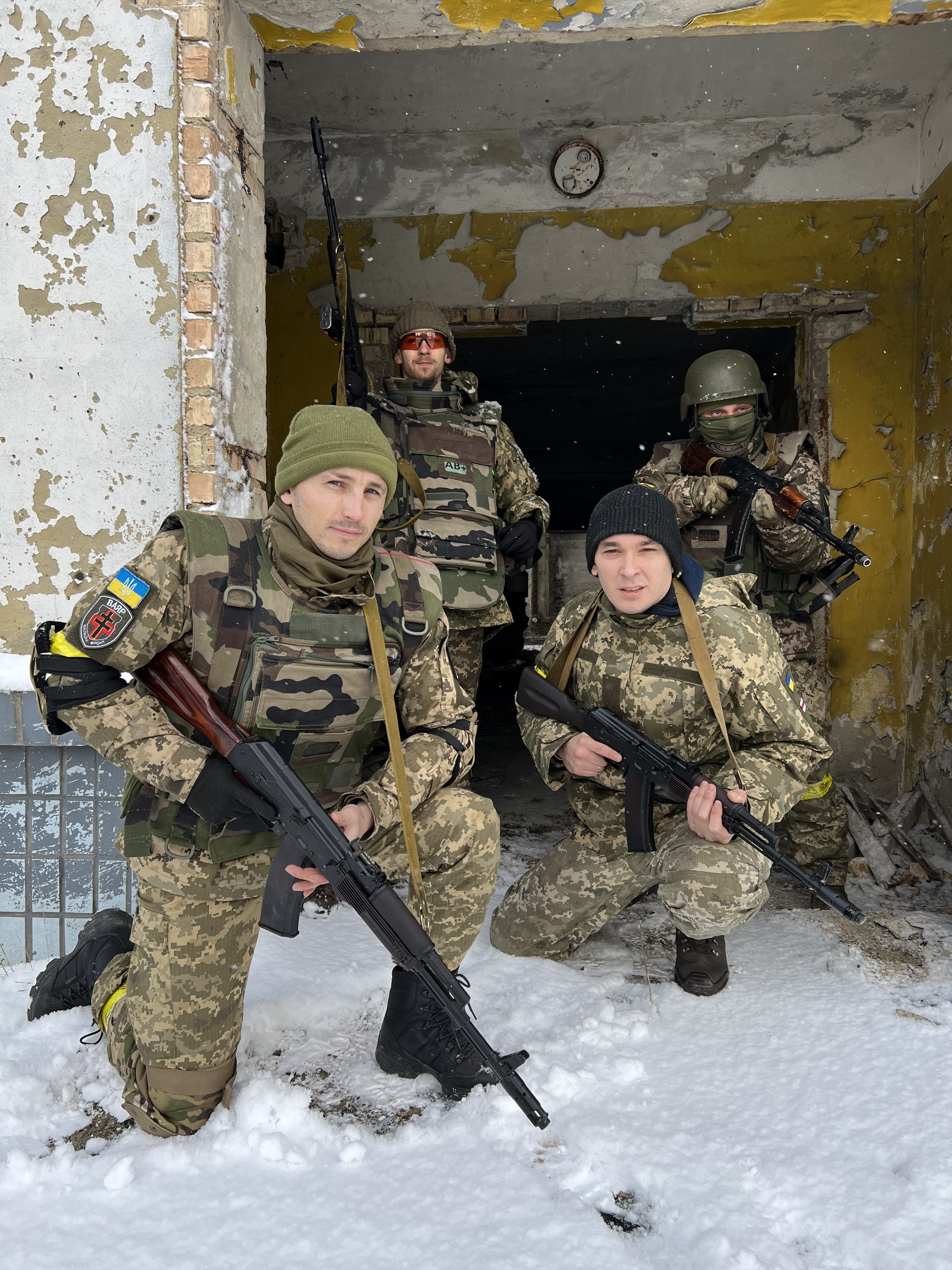
Belarusian volunteers of Ukraine's International Legion, 2022

The better-known combat units in which foreign nationals serve in another country's armed forces are the Gurkha units of the British and Indian armies, the French Foreign Legion, the Spanish Legion and the Ukrainian International Legion. Recruits from countries of the Commonwealth of Nations in the British Army swear allegiance to the British monarch and are liable to operate in any unit. Gurkhas, however, operate in dedicated Gurkha units of the British Army (specifically units that are administered by the Brigade of Gurkhas) and the Indian Army. Although they are nationals of Nepal, a country that is not part of the Commonwealth, they still swear allegiance (either to the Crown or the Constitution of India) and abide by the rules and regulations under which all British or Indian soldiers serve.

French Foreign Legionnaires serve in the French Foreign Legion, which deploys and fights as an organized unit of the French Army. This means that as members of the armed forces of Britain, India, and France these soldiers are not classed as mercenary soldiers per APGC77 Art 47.e and 47.f. Volunteers for the Ukraine Foreign legion have three-year contracts, and are eligible for Ukrainian citizenship (the probation period being the duration of the war).

== Private military companies ==
A private military company (PMC) is a private company providing armed combat or security services for financial gain. PMCs refer to their personnel as security contractors or private military contractors. PMC contractors are civilians (in governmental, international, and civil organizations) authorized to accompany an army to the field; thus, the term civilian contractor. PMCs may use armed force, defined as: "legally established enterprises that make a profit, by either providing services involving the potential exercise of [armed] force in a systematic way and by military means, and/or by the transfer of that potential to clients through training and other practices, such as logistics support, equipment procurement, and intelligence gathering".

Private paramilitary forces are functionally mercenary armies, though they may serve as security guards or military advisors; however, national governments reserve the right to control the number, nature, and armaments of such private armies, arguing that, provided they are not pro-actively employed in front-line combat, they are not mercenaries. In February 2002, a British Foreign and Commonwealth Office (FCO) report about PMCs noted that the demands of the military service from the UN and international civil organizations might mean that it is cheaper to pay PMCs than use soldiers. PMC "civilian contractors" tend to have poor reputations among professional government soldiers and officers—the U.S. Military Command has questioned their war zone behavior.

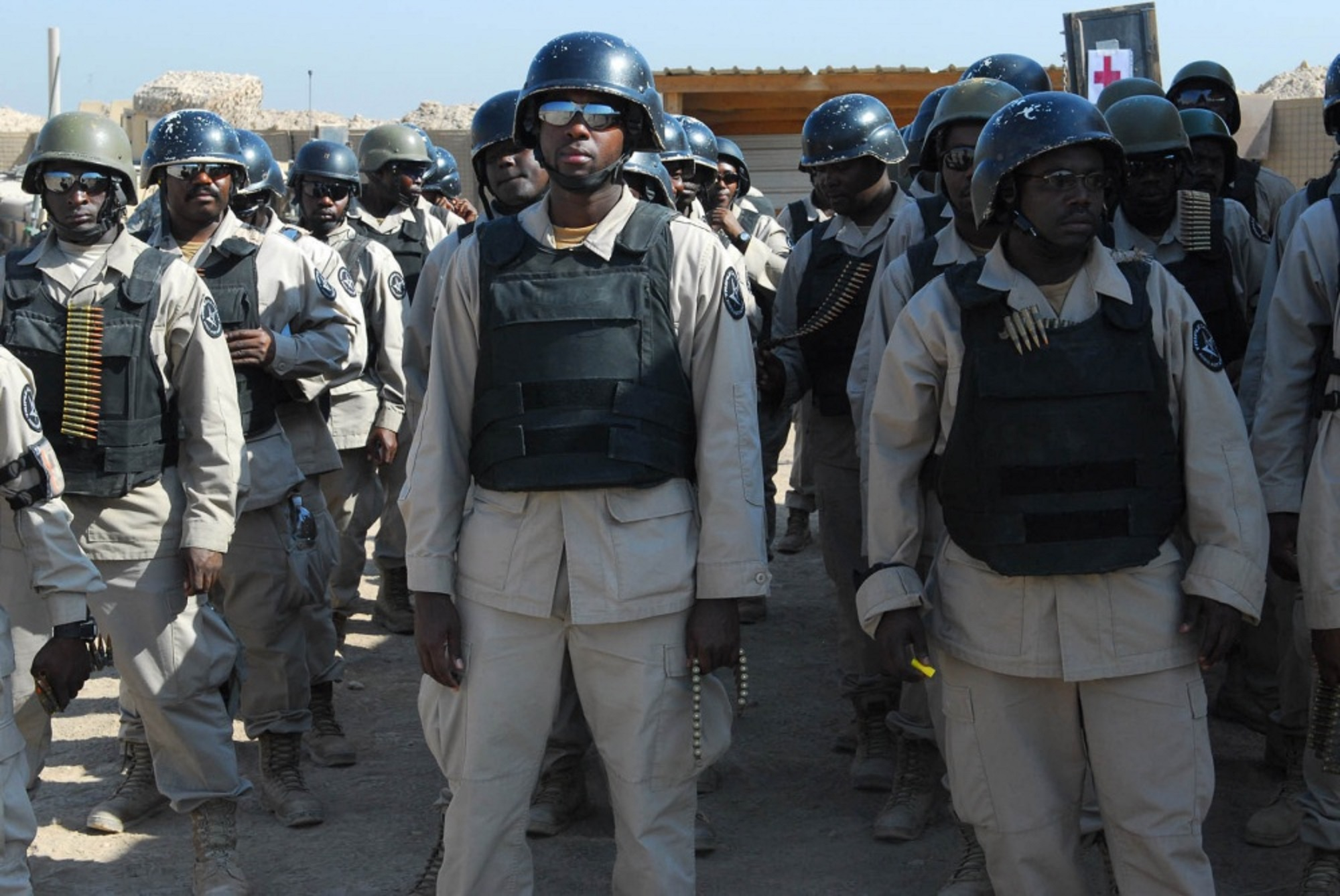
Ugandan Triple Canopy contractors undergoing training in Iraq, 2011

In September 2005, Brigadier General Karl Horst, deputy commander of the Third Infantry Division charged with Baghdad security after the 2003 invasion of Iraq, said of DynCorp and other PMCs:

These guys run loose in this country and do stupid stuff. There's no authority over them, so you can't come down on them hard when they escalate force... They shoot people, and someone else has to deal with the aftermath. It happens all over the place.

In 2004, the US and Coalition governments hired PMCs for security in Iraq. In March 2004, four Blackwater employees escorting food supplies and other equipment were attacked and killed in Fallujah in a videotaped attack; the killings and subsequent dismemberments were a cause for the First Battle of Fallujah.

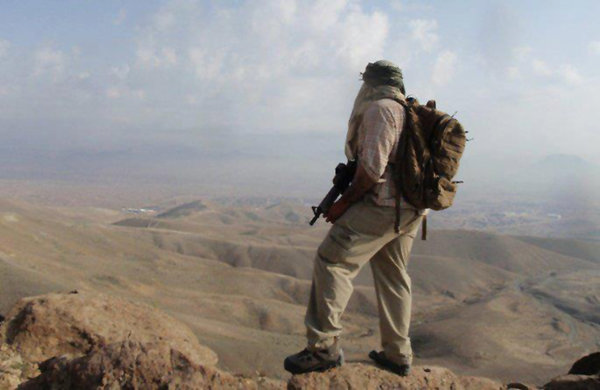
A private military contractor in Badakhshan Province, 2006

Afghan war operations also boosted the business. The United States has made extensive use of PMCs in Afghanistan since 2001, mostly in a defensive role. PMC teams have been used to guard bases and to protect VIPs from Taliban assassins, but almost never in offensive operations. One mercenary stated about his work in Afghanistan: "We are there purely to protect the principals and get them out, we're not there to get into huge firefights with the bad guys". One team from DynCorp provided bodyguards for President Hamid Karzai.

=== Colombia ===
In 2006, a US congressional report listed a number of PMCs and other enterprises that have signed contracts to carry out anti-narcotics operations and related activities as part of Plan Colombia. Referring to the use of American PMCs in Colombia, the former US Ambassador to Colombia Myles Frechette has said: "Congress and the American people don't want any servicemen killed overseas. So it makes sense that if contractors want to risk their lives, they get the job".

Not only have foreign PMCs worked in Colombia, but a disproportionate number of the mercenaries with PMCs are Colombian, as Colombia's long history of civil war has led to a surplus of experienced soldiers. Also, Colombian soldiers are much cheaper than soldiers from developed countries. PMCs from several Middle Eastern countries have signed contracts with the Colombian Defense Ministry to carry out security or military activities.

=== UN concerns over legality of PMCs ===
The United Nations questions whether PMC soldiers are sufficiently accountable for their war zone actions. A common argument for using PMCs (used by the PMCs themselves), is that PMCs may be able to help combat genocide and civilian slaughter where the UN or other countries are unwilling or unable to intervene. Yet, after considering using PMCs to support UN operations, Kofi Annan, the Secretary-General of the United Nations, decided against it.

In October 2007, the United Nations released a two-year study that stated, that although hired as "security guards", private contractors were performing military duties. The report found that the use of contractors such as Blackwater was a "new form of mercenary activity" and illegal under international law.

Most countries, including the United States and the United Kingdom, are not signatories to the 1989 United Nations Mercenary Convention banning the use of mercenaries. A spokesman for the US Mission to the UN denied that Blackwater security guards were mercenaries, saying "Accusations that U.S. government-contracted security guards, of whatever nationality, are mercenaries is inaccurate and demeaning to men and women who put their lives on the line to protect people and facilities every day."

== History ==
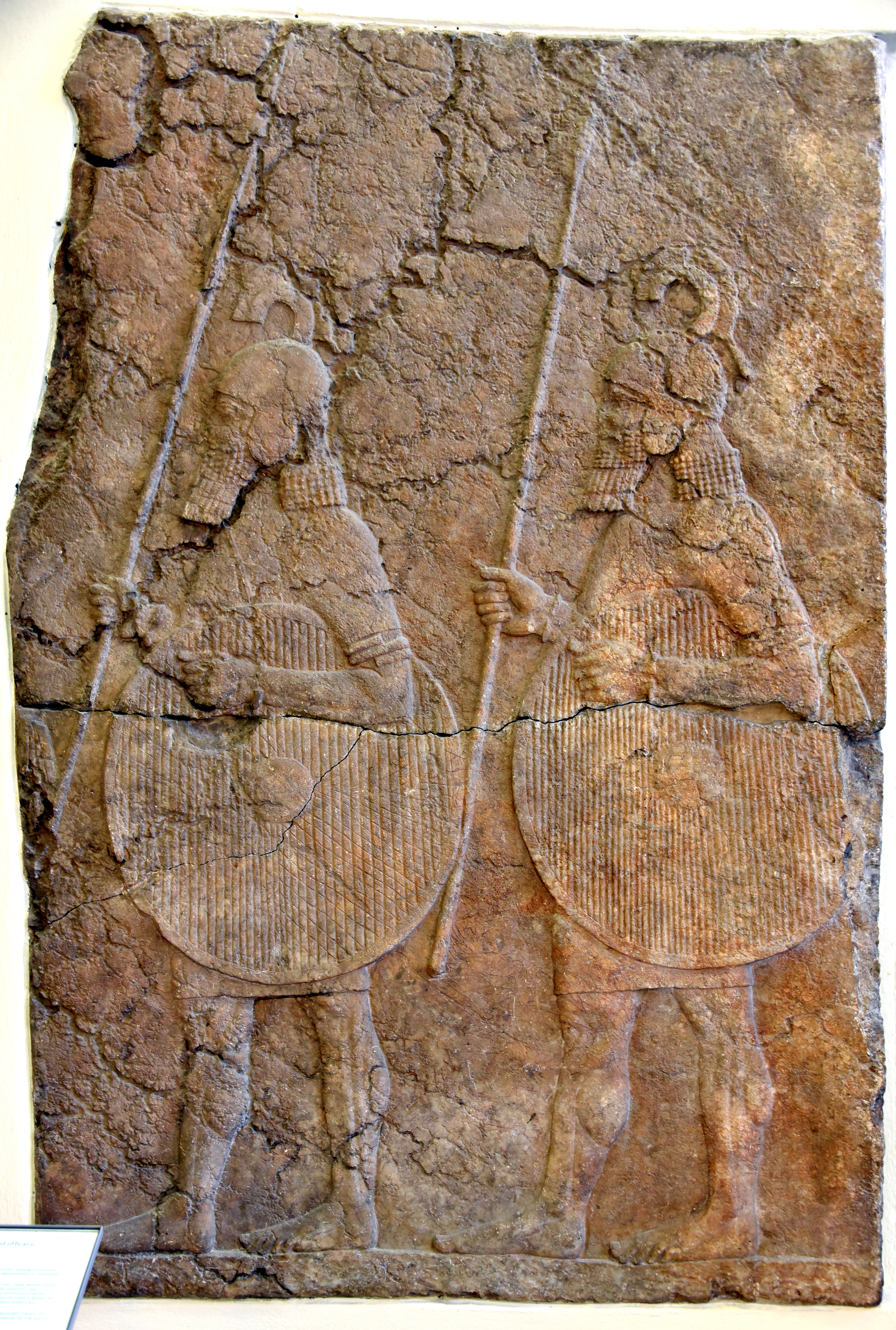
Alabaster-bas relief, non-Assyrian mercenaries in the Assyrian army. From the South-West Palace, Nineveh. 7th century BC

=== Europe ===
==== Classical era ====
===== Greek mercenaries in the Persian Empire =====
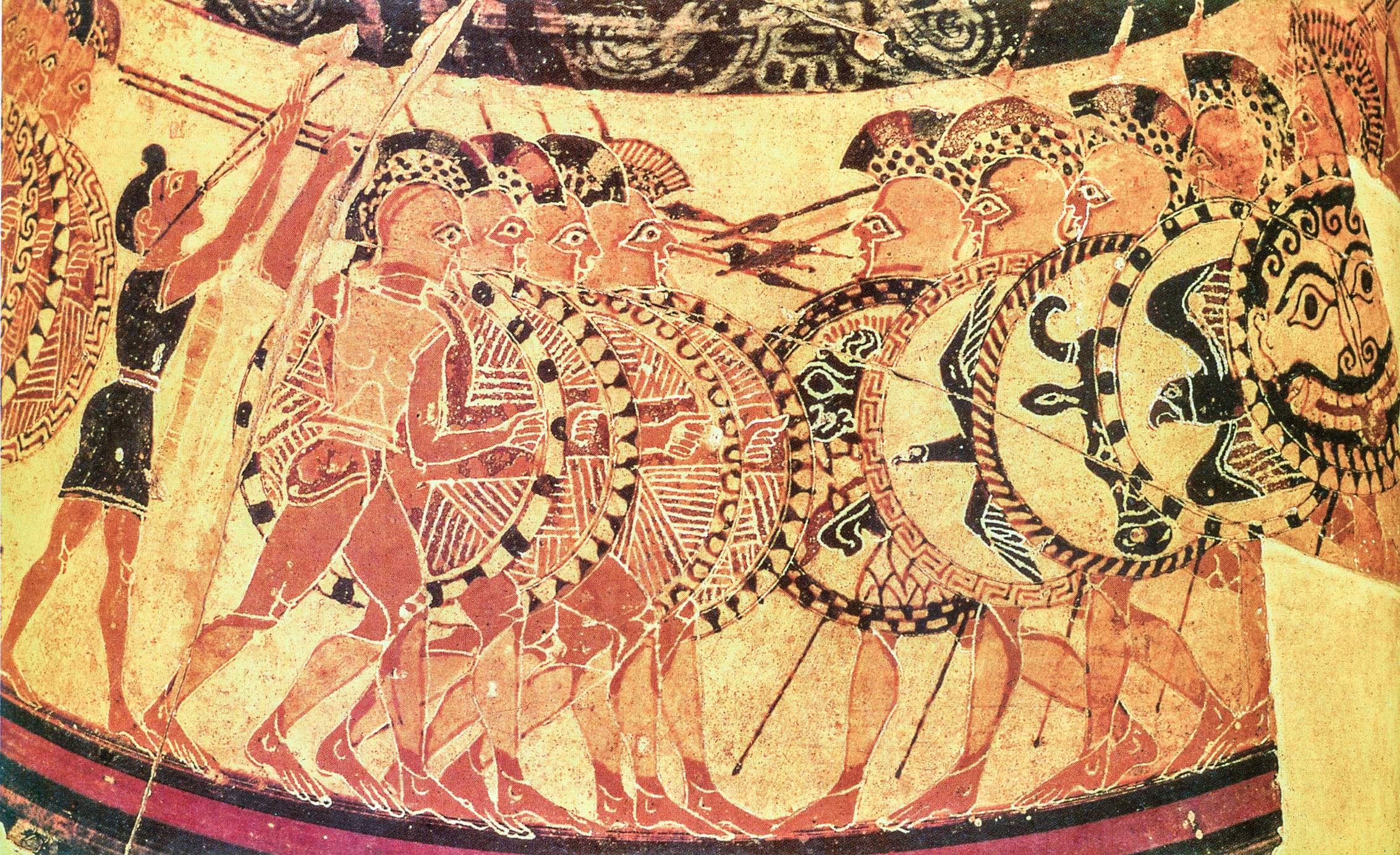
Chigi vase with hoplites holding javelins and spears

- Xerxes I, King of Persia, employed Arcadian mercenaries during his invasion of Greece.
- In Anabasis, Xenophon recounts how Cyrus the Younger hired a large army of Greek mercenaries (the "Ten Thousand") in 401 BC to seize the throne of Persia from his brother, Artaxerxes II. Though Cyrus' army was victorious at the Battle of Cunaxa, Cyrus himself was killed in battle and the expedition rendered moot. Stranded deep in enemy territory, the Spartan general Clearchus and most of the other Greek generals were subsequently killed by treachery. Xenophon played an instrumental role in encouraging "The Ten Thousand" Greek army to march north to the Black Sea in an epic fighting retreat.
- The Sileraioi were a group of ancient mercenaries most likely employed by the tyrant Dionysius I of Syracuse.
- In 378 BC the Persian Empire hired the Athenian general Iphicrates with his mercenaries in the Egyptian campaign.
- The Mania, who was a sub-satrap, used Greek mercenaries in order to capture other cities in the region.
- Memnon of Rhodes (380–333 BC) was the commander of the Greek mercenaries working for the Persian King Darius III when Alexander the Great of Macedonia invaded Persia in 334 BC and won the Battle of the Granicus River. Alexander also employed Greek mercenaries during his campaigns. These were men who fought for him directly and not those who fought in city-state units attached to his army.

===== Greek mercenaries in ancient India =====
Greek mercenaries were a significant part of the military forces in ancient India, particularly under the Indo-Greek Kingdoms and the Greco-Bactrian Kingdom. These Hellenistic states, founded by Greek rulers after the conquests of Alexander the Great, frequently employed mercenaries from the wider Greek world to maintain control over their territories and to engage in warfare with both Indian and Central Asian adversaries.

The presence of Greek mercenaries in India is documented in ancient Tamil literature, such as the Purananuru, which describes Greek soldiers, referred to as "Yavanas," (a loan from the Greek for "Ionians") as formidable warriors serving Indian rulers. These texts depict them as "valiant-eyed Yavanas, whose bodies were strong and of terrible aspect."

Greek mercenaries were particularly prominent in the armies of the Indo-Greek and Greco-Bactrian kings. Alfred Charles Auguste Foucher suggested that some of the warrior figures depicted in Gandhara art may represent Greek mercenaries, further supporting their role in military campaigns.

Stephanus of Byzantium recorded the existence of an ancient city called Daedala or Daidala (Ancient Greek: Δαίδαλα) in India, which he described as Indo-Cretan, likely due to the presence of Cretan mercenaries. This suggests that Greek soldiers not only fought in Indian campaigns but also settled in military colonies, forming part of the Hellenistic governance in the region.

===== Carthage =====
- Carthage contracted Balearic Islands shepherds as slingers during the Punic Wars against Rome. The vast majority of the Carthaginian military – except the highest officers, the navy, and the home guard – were mercenaries.
- Xanthippus of Carthage was a Spartan mercenary general employed by Carthage.
- Greek mercenaries were hired by Carthage to fight against the Dionysius I of Syracuse. Dionysius made Carthage pay a very high ransom for the Carthaginian prisoners, but he left the Greek mercenaries prisoners free without any ransom. This made the Carthaginians suspicious of their Greek mercenaries and discharged them all from their service. With this trick Dionysius did not have to fight again against the Greek mercenaries of Carthage who were very dangerous enemies.

===== Byzantine Empire =====
In the late Roman Empire, it became increasingly difficult for Emperors and generals to raise military units from the citizenry for various reasons: lack of manpower, lack of time available for training, lack of materials, and, inevitably, political considerations. Therefore, beginning in the late 4th century, the empire often contracted whole bands of barbarians either within the legions or as autonomous foederati. The barbarians were Romanized and surviving veterans were established in areas requiring population. The Varangian Guard of the Byzantine Empire is the best known formation made up of barbarian mercenaries (see next section).

===== Other =====
- Members of independent Thracian tribes such as the Bessi and Dii often joined the ranks of large organized armies as mercenaries.
- The Sons of Mars were Italian mercenaries used by the Greek kings of Syracuse until after the Punic Wars.
- A figure in oral legend, Milesius was given the princess Scota after conducting a successful campaign for Ancient Egypt.
- The rulers of Hasmonean Judea employed a core Jewish infantry but increasingly supplemented them with foreign mercenaries. John Hyrcanus is the earliest Hasmonean ruler known to have employed mercenaries. Their use appears to have expanded under king Alexander Jannaeus, who employed mercenaries from Pisidia and Cilicia. Later, Aristobulus II, Alexander's son, recruited mercenaries from Lebanon, Trachonitis, and local rulers.
- Mithridates VI Eupator recruited a large number of Iranians along with the Galatians into the Pontic army during the Mithridatic Wars against Rome, using the Leucosyri, Persians and Scythians.
- Illyrians were hired across the Balkans and further. They were known for their unreliability.

==== Medieval warfare ====
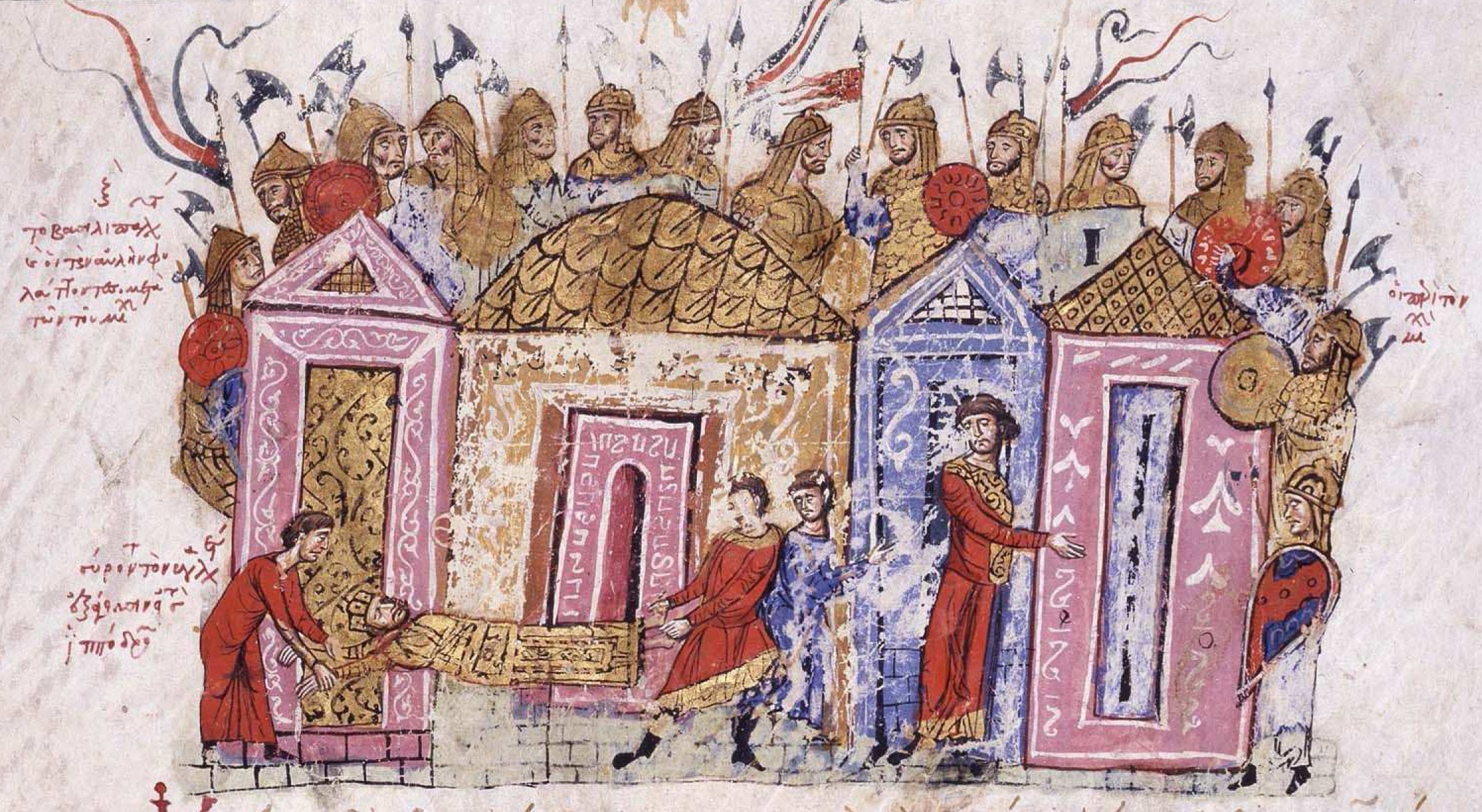
Varangian Guardsmen, an illumination from the 11th century chronicle of John Skylitzes

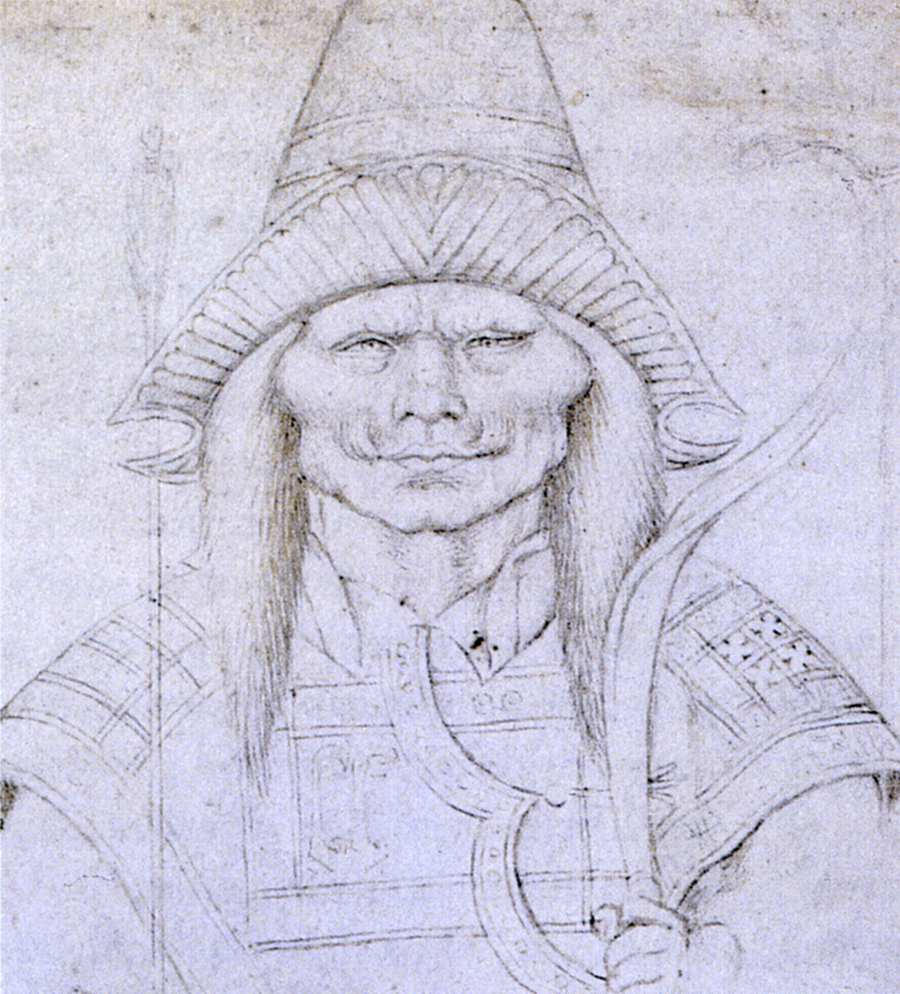
Turkish mercenary in Byzantine service c. 1436

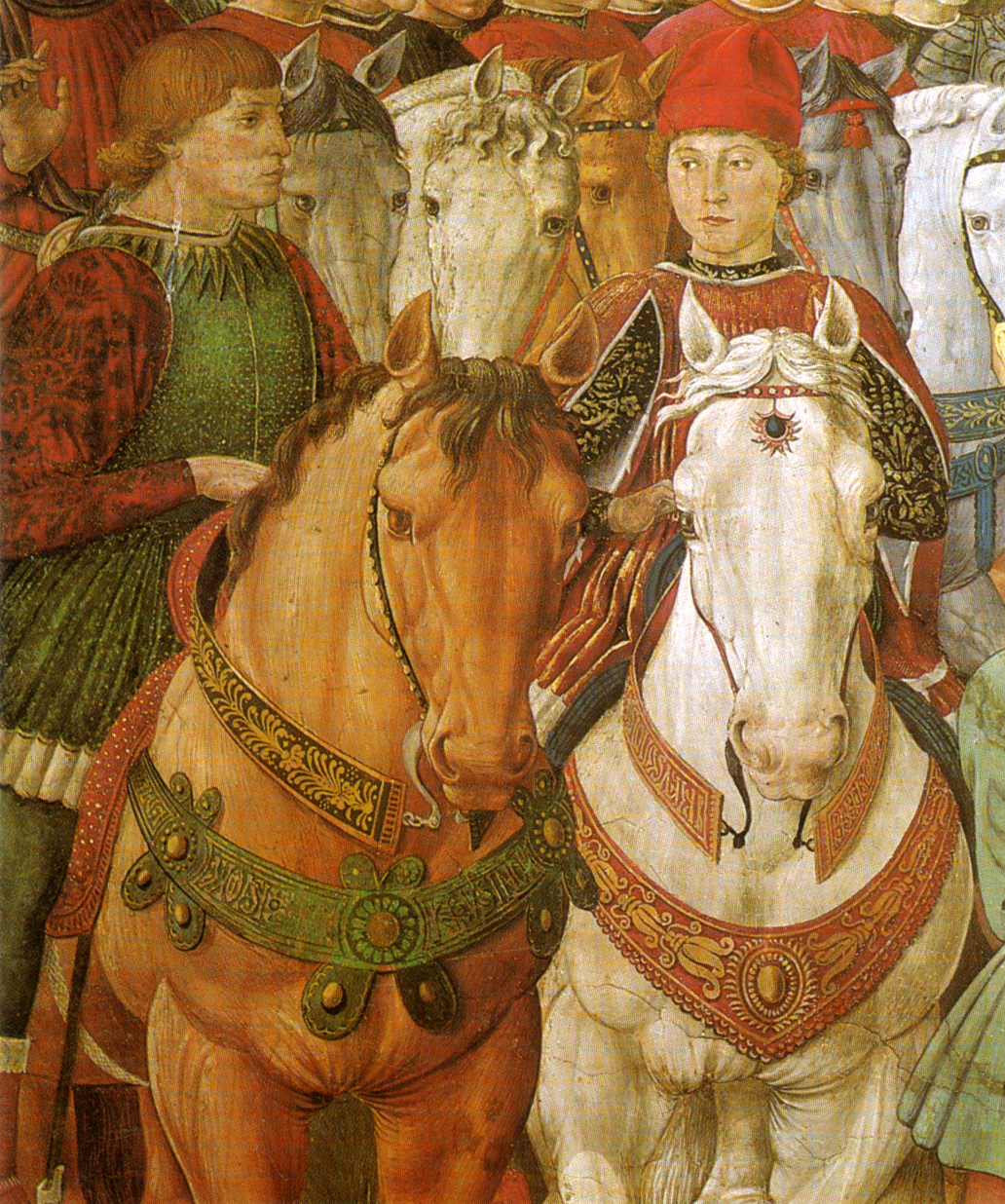
Fresco with Sigismondo Pandolfo Malatesta (left) and Galeazzo Maria Sforza, by Benozzo Gozzoli. Condottiero meant "contractor" in its more literal sense but came to be applied to leaders of mercenary groups in Italy during the Late Middle Ages and the Renaissance.

Byzantine emperors followed the Roman practice and contracted foreigners especially for their personal corps guard called the Varangian Guard. They were chosen among war-prone peoples, of whom the Varangians (Norsemen) were preferred. Their mission was to protect the Emperor and Empire and since they did not have links to the Greeks, they were expected to be ready to suppress rebellions. One of the most famous guards was the future king Harald III of Norway, also known as Harald Hardrada ("Hard-counsel"), who arrived in Constantinople in 1035 and was employed as a Varangian Guard. He participated in eighteen battles and was promoted to akolythos, the commander of the Guard, before returning home in 1043. He was killed at the Battle of Stamford Bridge in 1066 when his army was defeated by an English army commanded by King Harold Godwinson. The point at which the Varangians ceased to be in the service of the Roman Empire remains unclear.

In England at the time of the Norman Conquest, Flemings (natives of Flanders) formed a substantial mercenary element in the forces of William the Conqueror with many remaining in England as settlers under the Normans. Contingents of mercenary Flemish soldiers were to form significant forces in England throughout the time of the Norman and early Plantagenet dynasties (11th and 12th centuries). A prominent example of these were the Flemings who fought during the English civil wars, known as the Anarchy or the Nineteen-Year Winter (AD 1135 to 1154), under the command of William of Ypres, who was King Stephen's chief lieutenant from 1139 to 1154 and who was made Earl of Kent by Stephen.

In Italy, the condottiero was a military chief offering his troops, the condottieri, to Italian city-states. The condottieri were extensively used by the Italian city-states in their wars against one another. At times, the condottieri seized control of the state, as one condottiero, Francesco Sforza, made himself the Duke of Milan in 1450. During the ages of the Taifa kingdoms of the Iberian peninsula, Christian knights like El Cid could fight for a Muslim ruler against his Christian or Muslim enemies. The Almogavars originally fought for the counts of Barcelona and kings of Aragon, but as the Catalan Company, they followed Roger de Flor in the service of the Byzantine Empire. In 1311, the Catalan Great Company defeated at the Battle of Halmyros their former employer, Walter V, Count of Brienne, after he refused to pay them, and took over the Duchy of Athens. The Great Company ruled much of central and southern Greece until 1388–1390 when a rival mercenary company, the Navarrese Company were hired to oust them. Catalan and German mercenaries also had prominent role in the Serbian victory over Bulgarians in the Battle of Velbuzd in 1330.

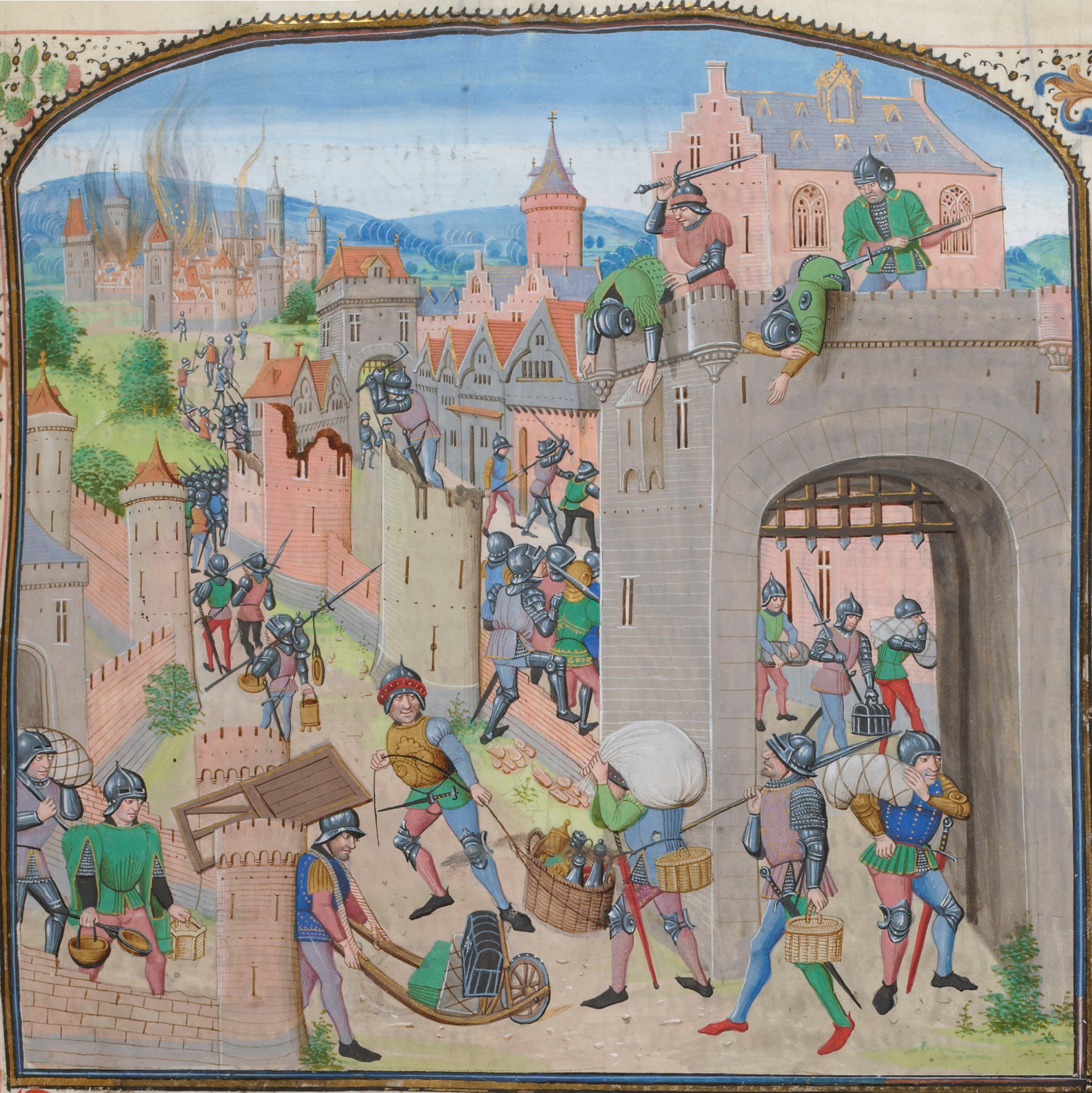
The Tard-Venus routiers pillage Grammont in 1362, from Froissart's Chronicles

During the later Middle Ages, Free Companies (or Free Lances) were formed, consisting of companies of mercenary troops. Nation-states lacked the funds needed to maintain standing forces, so they tended to hire free companies to serve in their armies during wartime. Such companies typically formed at the ends of periods of conflict, when men-at-arms were no longer needed by their respective governments. The veteran soldiers thus looked for other forms of employment, often becoming mercenaries. Free Companies would often specialize in forms of combat that required longer periods of training that was not available in the form of a mobilized militia.

The Routiers formed a distinctive subculture in medieval France who alternated between serving as mercenaries in wartime and bandits in peacetime. The routiers were very destructive and became a significant social problem. After the Treaty of Brétigny ended the war between England and France in 1360, the French countryside was overrun by Free Companies of routiers while the French Crown lacked the necessary military and economic strength to put an end to their activities. To rid France of the rampaging mercenaries and to overthrow the pro-English King Pedro the Cruel of Castile, Marshal Bertrand du Guesclin was directed by King Charles V of France to take the Free Companies into Castile with the orders to put the pro-French Enrique de Trastámara on the Castilian throne. Guesclin's mercenaries were organized into the Big Companies and French Companies and played a decisive role in putting Enrique on the Castilian throne in 1369, who styled himself King Enrique II, the first Castilian monarch of the House of Trastámara.

The White Company commanded by Sir John Hawkwood is the best known English Free Company of the 14th century. Between the 13th and 17th centuries the Gallowglass fought within the Islands of Britain and also mainland Europe. A Welshman Owain Lawgoch (Owain of the Red Hand) formed a free company and fought for the French against the English during the Hundred Years' War, before being assassinated by a Scot named Jon Lamb, under the orders of the English Crown, during the siege of Mortagne in 1378.

==== 15th and 16th centuries ====
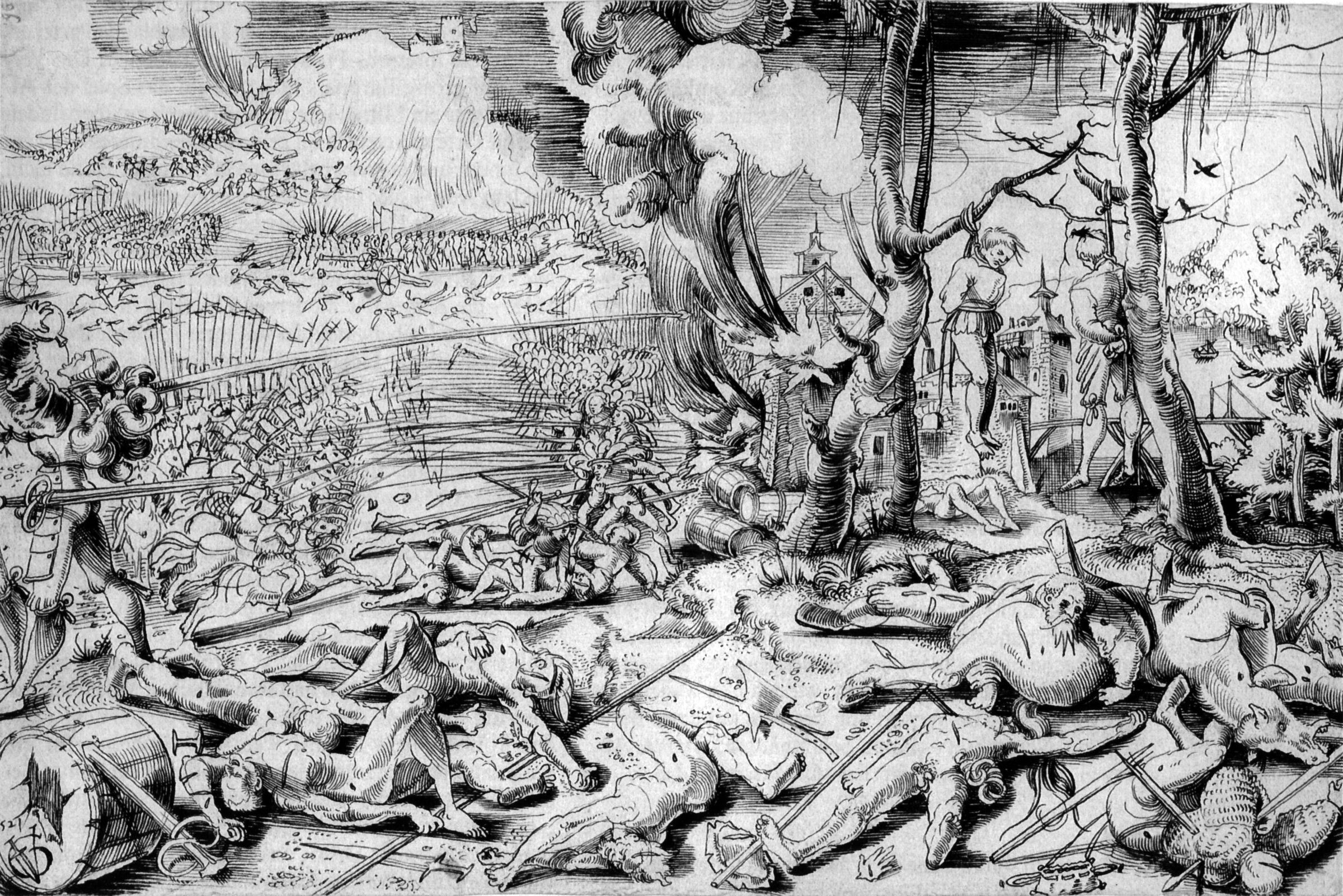
The battlefield of Marignano, drawing by Urs Graf, himself a Swiss mercenary who may have fought there

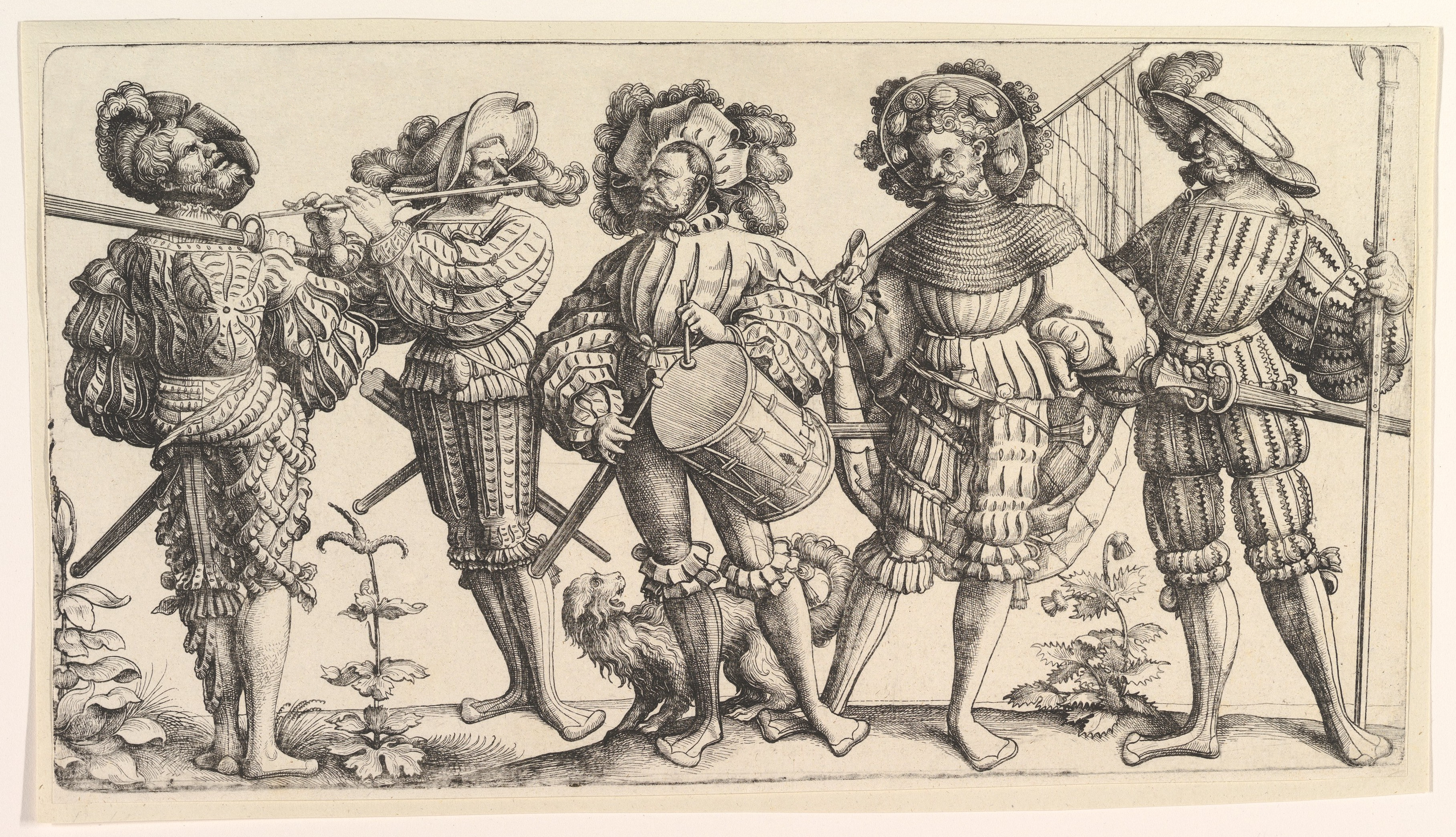
Landsknechte, etching by Daniel Hopfer, c. 1530

Swiss mercenaries were sought during the late 15th and early 16th centuries as being an effective fighting force, until their somewhat rigid battle formations became vulnerable to arquebuses and artillery being developed at the same time. The Swiss Guard in particular were employed by the Papal States from 1506 (continuing to serve today as the military of Vatican City).

It was then that the German landsknechts, colorful mercenaries with a redoubtable reputation, took over the Swiss forces' legacy and became the most formidable force of the late 15th century and throughout the 16th century, being hired by all the powers in Europe and often fighting at opposite sides. Sir Thomas More in his Utopia advocated the use of mercenaries in preference to citizens. The barbarian mercenaries employed by the Utopians are thought to be inspired by the Swiss mercenaries.

Niccolò Machiavelli generally argued against the use of mercenary armies in his book of political advice The Prince. His rationale being that mercenaries are disloyal and will either betray their employer, or lose to the enemy.

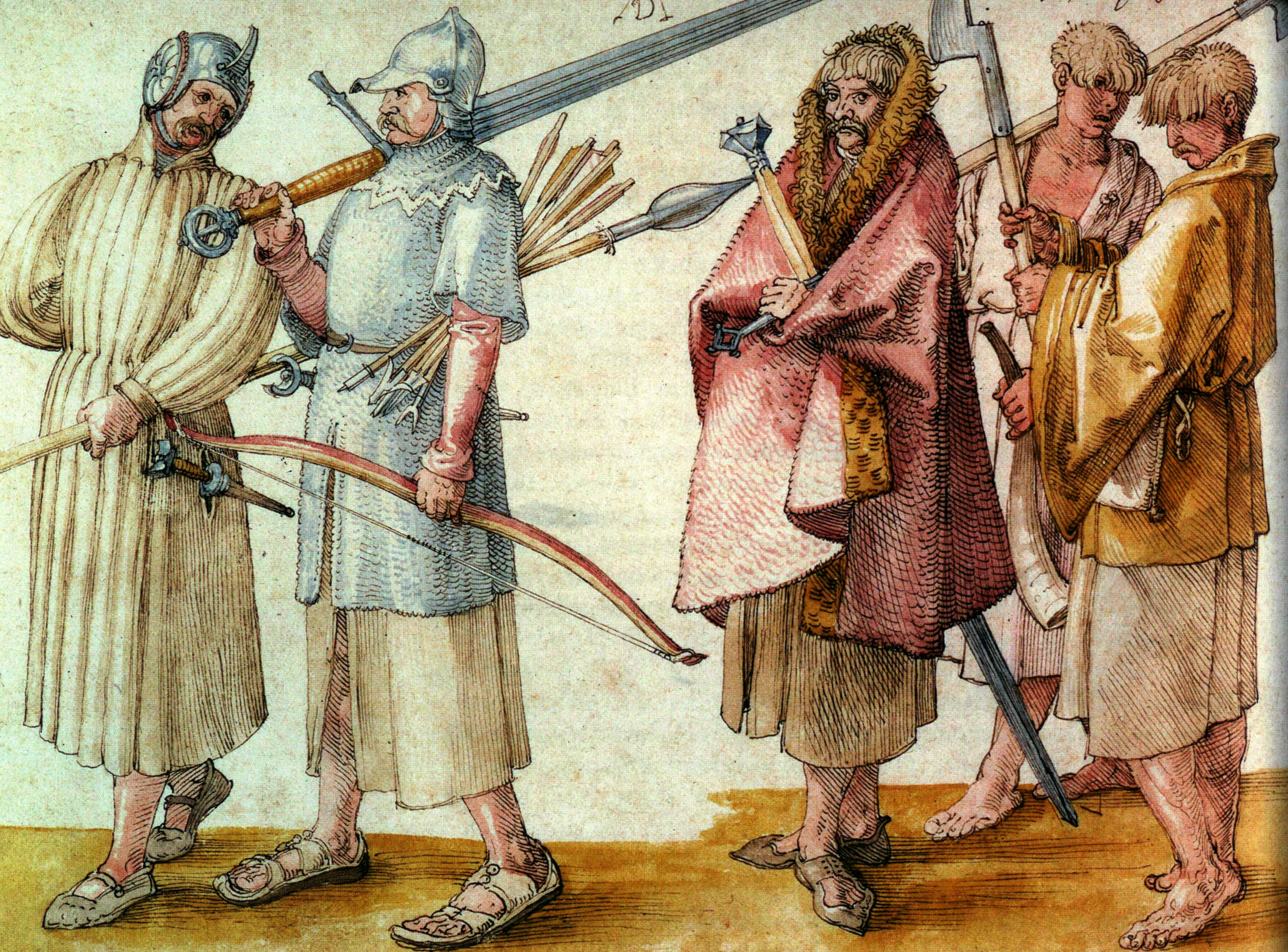
Irish kern and gallowglass mercenaries. Drawing by Albrecht Dürer, 1521.

The Stratioti or Stradioti (Italian: Stradioti or Stradiotti; Greek: Στρατιώτες, Stratiotes) were mercenary units from the Balkans recruited mainly by states of Central and Southern Europe from the 15th century until the middle of the 18th century. The Stratioti were recruited in Albania, Greece, Dalmatia, Serbia, and later Cyprus. Most modern historians have indicated that the Stratioti were mostly Albanians. According to a study by a Greek author, around 80% of the listed names attributed to the Stratioti were of Albanian origin while most of the remaining ones, especially those of officers, were of Greek origin; a small minority were of South Slavic origin. Among their leaders there were also members of some old Byzantine Greek noble families such as the Palaiologoi and Comneni. The Stratioti were pioneers of light cavalry tactics during this era. In the early 16th century, heavy cavalry in the European armies was principally remodeled after Albanian Stratioti of the Venetian army, Hungarian hussarss, and German mercenary cavalry units (Schwarzreitern). They employed hit-and-run tactics, ambushes, feigned retreats, and other complex maneuvers. In some ways, these tactics echoed those of the Ottoman sipahis and akinci. They had some notable successes also against French heavy cavalry during the Italian Wars. They were known for cutting off the heads of dead or captured enemies, and according to Commines they were paid by their leaders one ducat per head.

In Italy, during inter-family conflicts such as the Wars of Castro, mercenaries were widely used to supplement the much smaller forces loyal to particular families. Often these were further supplemented by troops loyal to particular duchies which had sided with one or more of the belligerents.

==== 17th and 18th centuries ====
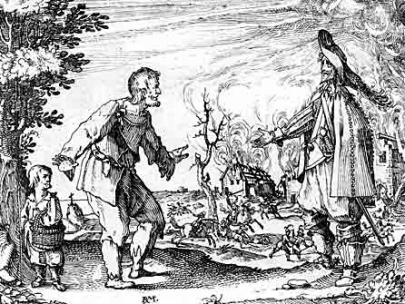
A peasant begs a mercenary for mercy in front of his burning farm during the Thirty Years' War.

During the 17th and 18th centuries, extensive use was made of foreign recruits in the now regimented and highly drilled armies of Europe, beginning in a systematized way with the Thirty Years' War. Historian Geoffrey Parker notes that 40,000 Scotsmen (about fifteen percent of the adult male population) served as soldiers in Continental Europe from 1618 to 1640. After the signing of the Treaty of Limerick (1691) the soldiers of the Irish Army who left Ireland for France took part in what is known as the Flight of the Wild Geese. Subsequently, many made a living from fighting in continental armies, the most famous of whom was Patrick Sarsfield, who, having fallen mortally wounded at the Battle of Landen fighting for the French, said "If this was only for Ireland".

Peter Hagendorf was a German mercenary whose rediscovered diary provides a rare, firsthand account of life during the Thirty Years' War.

The brutality of the Thirty Years' War, in which several parts of Germany were ransacked by the mercenary troops, and left almost unpopulated, led to the formation of standing armies of professional soldiers, recruited locally or abroad. These armies were active also in peacetime. The formation of these armies in the late 18th century led to professionalization and standardization of clothing (uniforms), equipment, drill, weapons, etc. Since smaller states like the Dutch Republic could afford a large standing army, but could not find enough recruits among its own citizens, recruiting foreigners was common. Prussia had developed a form of conscription, but relied in wartime also on foreign recruits, although the regulations stated that no more than one third of the recruits were to be foreign. Prussian recruiting methods were often aggressive, and resulted more than once in conflicts with neighbouring states. The term mercenary gained its notoriety during this development, since mercenaries were—and now are—often seen as soldiers who fight for no noble cause, but only for money, and who have no loyalty than to the highest bidder, as opposed to the professional soldiers who takes an oath of loyalty and who is seen as the defender of the nation.

The mercenary soldiers thus fell out of favor and was replaced by the professional soldier. Jean Martinet was a severe drillmaster, which made him unpopular among his troops, and "vigorously imposed discipline on both men and officers: henceforward the latter had to obey commands given to them by superior officers regardless of their own social status." Martinet revolutionized the early modern army by instituting a standardized system capable of turning raw recruits into a disciplined fighting force, thereby eliminating the mercenaries, who had been the mainstays of earlier armies. He also introduced the bayonet and the depot system into the French army, which put a stop to the army feeding off the enemy land, making war more humane and effective. The English word martinet derives from the general's last name.

To augment the army, major European powers like France, Britain, the Dutch Republic and Spain contracted regiments from Switzerland, the Southern Netherlands (modern day Belgium), and several smaller German states. About a third of the infantry regiments of the French Royal Army prior to the French Revolution were recruited from outside France. The largest single group were the twelve Swiss regiments (including the Swiss Guard). Other units were German and one Irish Brigade (the "Wild Geese") had originally been made up of Irish volunteers. By 1789 difficulties in obtaining genuinely Irish recruits had led to German and other foreigners making up the bulk of the rank and file. The officers however continued to be drawn from long established Franco-Irish families. During the reign of Louis XV there was also a Scottish (Garde Écossaise), a Swedish (Royal-Suédois), an Italian (Royal-Italien) and a Walloon (Horion-Liegeois) regiment recruited outside the borders of France. The foreign infantry regiments comprised about 20,000 men in 1733, rising to 48,000 at the time of the Seven Years' War and being reduced in numbers thereafter.

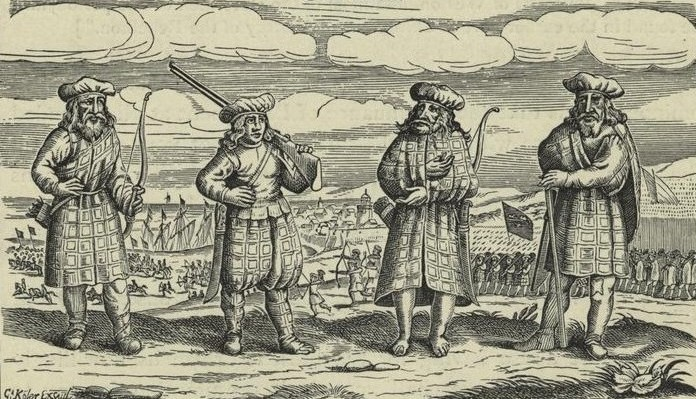
The Scottish Highlander mercenaries, known as Redshanks in Ireland, in the service of Gustavus Adolphus of Sweden; 1631 German engraving

The Dutch Republic had contracted several Scots, Swiss and German regiments in the early 18th century, and kept three Scots, one Walloon, and six Swiss regiments (including a Guard regiment raised in 1749) throughout the 18th century. The Scots regiments were contracted from Great Britain, but as relations between Britain and the Republic deteriorated, the regiments could no longer recruit in Scotland, leading to the regiments being Scots in name only until they were nationalized in 1784. Patrick Gordon, a Scottish mercenary fought at various times for Poland and Sweden, constantly changing his loyalty based on who could pay him the best, until he took up Russian service in 1661. In August 1689, during a coup d'état attempt in Moscow against co-tsar Peter the Great led by the Sophia Alekseyevna in the name of the other co-tsar, the intellectually disabled Ivan V, Gordon played the decisive role in defeating the coup and ensuring Peter's triumph. Gordon remained one of Peter's favorite advisers until his death.

The Spanish Army also made use of permanently established foreign regiments. These were three Irish regiments (Irlanda, Hiberni and Ultonia); one Italian (Naples) and five Swiss (Wimpssen, Reding, Betschart, Traxer and Preux). In addition one regiment of the Royal Guard including Irishmen as Patten, McDonnell and Neiven, was recruited from Walloons. The last of these foreign regiments was disbanded in 1815, following recruiting difficulties during the Napoleonic Wars. One complication arising from the use of non-national troops occurred at the Battle of Bailén in 1808 when the "red Swiss" (so-called from their uniforms) of the invading French Army clashed bloodily with "blue Swiss" in the Spanish service.

During the American Revolutionary War, the British government hired several regiments from German principalities to supplement the Army. They became known to revolutionaries as Hessians and were portrayed by propagandists as mercenaries. However, they were auxiliaries and do not meet the definition of mercenary.

==== 19th to 21st centuries ====
During the South American wars of independence from Spain, the British Legions from 1817 onward fought for General Simón Bolívar. Some of the British Legionaries were liberal idealists who went to South America to fight in a war for freedom, but others were the more classic mercenaries, mostly unemployed veterans of the Napoleonic wars, who fought for money. In South America, especially in Colombia, the men of the British Legions are remembered as heroes for their crucial role in helping end Spanish rule. During the First Carlist War, the British government suspended the Foreign Enlistment Act to allow the recruitment of a quasi-official British Auxiliary Legion under George de Lacy Evans, which went to Spain to fight for Queen Isabel II against the followers of Don Carlos, the pretender to the Spanish throne.

The Atholl Highlanders, a private Scottish infantry regiment of the Duke of Atholl, was formed in 1839 purely for ceremonial purposes. It was granted official regimental status by Queen Victoria in 1845 and is the only remaining legal private army in Europe.

Turkey and Azerbaijan deployed Syrian mercenaries during the 2020 Nagorno-Karabakh war.

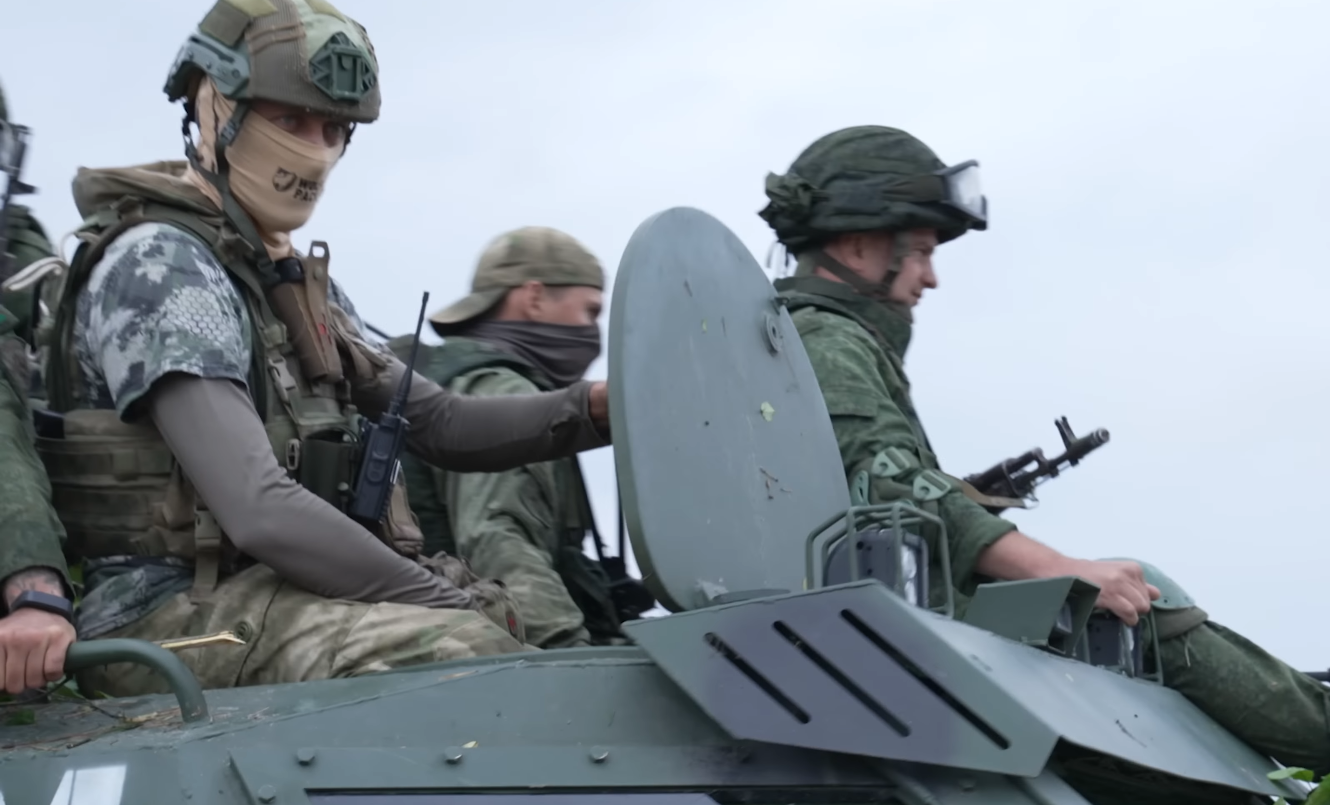
Wagner Group mercenaries in Belarus, July 2023

Syrian mercenaries are being deployed by Russia, with expected numbers ranging from hundreds to up to 40,000 fighters ultimately expected to take part. Wagner Group mercenaries are active in the Syrian civil war and sledgehammered a Syrian man to death. On 8 November 2024, US President Joe Biden allowed American Private Military Contractors to deploy to Ukraine. Per the United States Department of Defense, these contractors will help Ukraine repair and maintain military equipment.

=== East Asia ===
==== Warring States ====
Mercenaries were regularly used by the kingdoms of the Warring States period of China. Military advisers and generals trained through the works of Mozi and Sun Tzu would regularly offer their services to kings and dukes.

After the Qin conquest of the Warring States, the Qin and later Han Empires would also employ mercenaries – ranging from nomadic horse archers in the Northern steppes or soldiers from the Yue kingdoms of the South. The 7th-century Tang dynasty was also prominent for its use of mercenaries, when they hired Tibetan and Uyghur soldiers against invasion from the Göktürks and other steppe civilizations.

==== 15th to 18th centuries ====
The Saika mercenary group of the Kii Province, Japan, played a significant role during the Siege of Ishiyama Hongan-ji that took place between August 1570 to August 1580. The Saikashuu were famed for the support of Ikkō Buddhist sect movements and greatly impeded the advance of Oda Nobunaga's forces.

Ninja were peasant farmers who learned the art of war to combat the daimyō's samurai. They were hired out by many as mercenaries to perform capture, infiltration and retrieval, and, most famously, assassinations. Ninja possibly originated around the 14th century, but were not widely known or used till the 15th century and carried on being hired till the mid-18th century. In the 16th and 17th centuries, the Spanish in the Philippines employed samurai mercenaries from Japan to help control the archipelago. Aboard the wreck of one Spanish galleon, the San Diego, that sank in Filipino waters on 14 December 1600 were found numerous tsubas, the handguards of the katanas, the distinctive swords used by the samurai.

In 1615, the Dutch invaded Ai Island with Japanese mercenaries.

==== 19th century ====
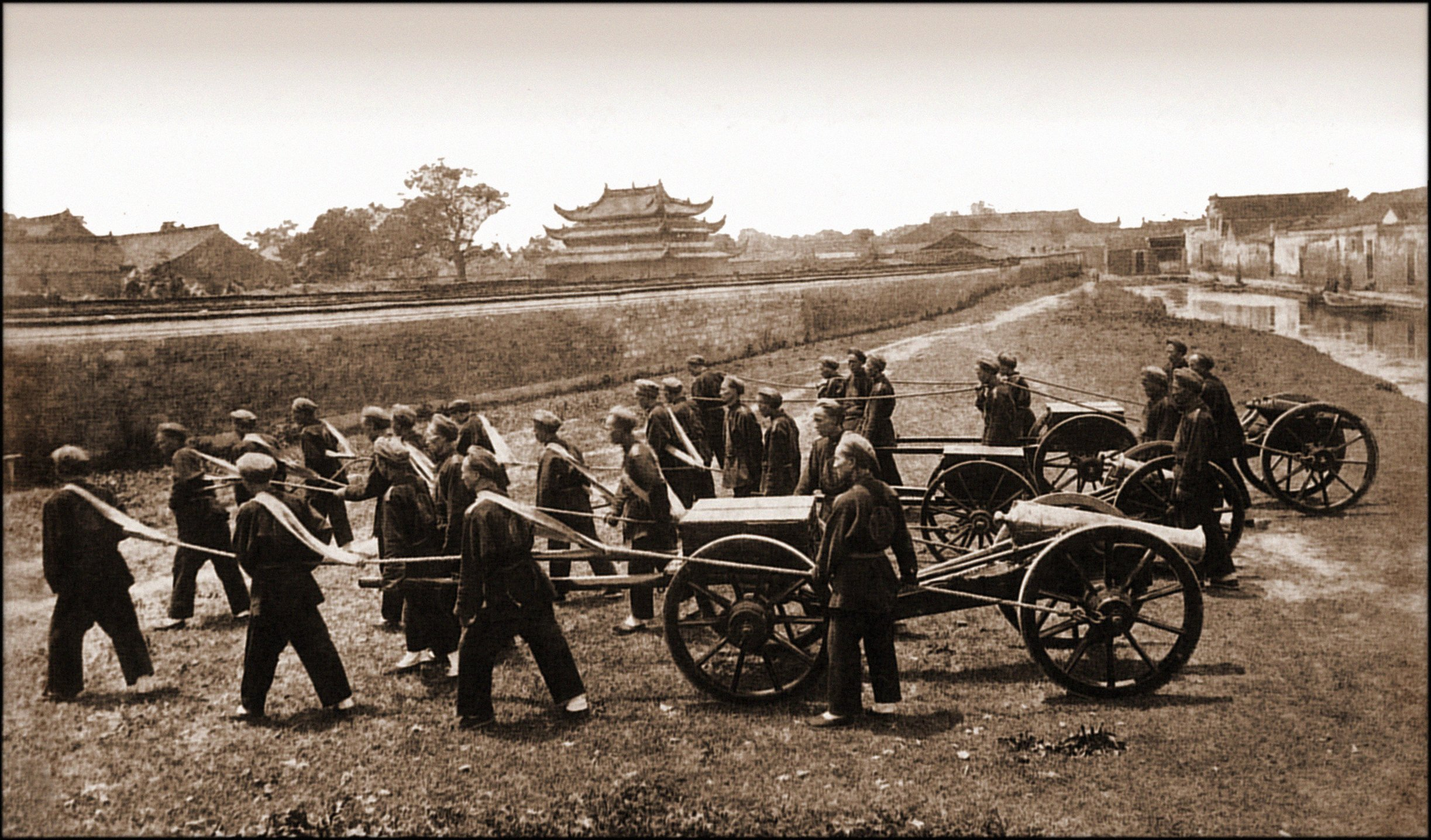
Mercenary artillerymen in China, c. 1880

Between 1850 and 1864, the Taiping Rebellion raged as the Taiping (Heavenly Peace) Army led by Hong Xiuquan, the self-proclaimed younger brother of Jesus Christ, engaged in a bloody civil war against the forces loyal to the Qing emperor. As Hong and his followers, who numbered in the millions, were hostile to Western business interests, a group of Western merchants based in Shanghai created a mercenary army known as the Ever Victorious Army. During the Taiping Rebellion, the Qing came close to losing control of China. It was common for the financially hard-pressed Qing emperors to subcontract out the business of raising armies to fight the Taiping to the loyalist provincial gentry, which formed the origins of the warlords who were to dominate China after the overthrow of the Qing in 1912.

The rank and file of the Ever-Victorious Army were Chinese, but the senior officers were Westerners. The first commander was an American adventurer, Colonel Frederick Townsend Ward. After Ward was killed in action in 1862, command was assumed by another American adventurer, Henry Andres Burgevine, but the Chinese disliked him on the account of his racism and his alcoholism. Burgevine was replaced with a British Army officer seconded to Chinese service, Colonel Charles "Chinese" Gordon.

A highly successful commander, Gordon won thirty-three battles in succession against the Taipings in 1863–1864 as he led the Ever Victorious Army down the Yangtze river valley and played a decisive role in defeating the Taipings. Through technically not a mercenary as Gordon had been assigned by the British government to lead the Ever Victorious Army, the Times of London in a leader (editorial) in August 1864 declared: "the part of the soldier of fortune is in these days very difficult to play with honour...but if ever the actions of a soldier fighting in foreign service ought to be viewed with indulgence, and even with admiration, this exceptional tribute is due to Colonel Gordon".

During the French conquest of Vietnam, their most persistent and stubborn opponents were not the Vietnamese, but rather the Chinese mercenaries of the Black Flag Army commanded by Liu Yongfu, who been hired by the Emperor Tự Đức. In 1873, the Black Flags killed the French commander, Francis Garnier, attracting much attention in France. In 1883, Captain Henri Rivière, leading another French expedition into Vietnam was also killed by the Black Flags. When the French conquest of Vietnam was finally completed in 1885, one of the peace terms were the disbandment of the Black Flag Army. Chinese flag rebels also fought in the Haw wars in Laos and northern Thailand.

Philo McGiffin served as a naval mercenary in the Sino-French War and First Sino-Japanese War.

==== 20th century ====
In Warlord Era China, the majority of soldiers fighting for warlords did so for monetary compensation. With many enlisting solely to avoid poverty and famine and deserting their armies if payment ceased.Foreign soldiers of fortune were present in China as well. With British mercenaries such as Morris "Two Gun" Cohen and Francis Arthur "One Armed" Sutton serving warlords. White emigre veterans of the Russian Civil War such as Konstantin Petrovich Nechaev commanded a detachment of 300 White Russian soldiers for the Fengtian Clique.

In the early stages of the Second Sino-Japanese War, a number of foreign pilots served in the Chinese Air Force, most famously in the 14th Squadron, a light bombardment unit often called the International Squadron, which was briefly active in February and March 1938.

During the Malayan Emergency, The British Army recruited 1,000 mercenaries from the Iban people. They would be implicated in the British Malayan headhunting scandal.

=== India ===
==== 18th to 19th centuries ====
In the medieval period, Purbiya mercenaries from Bihar and Eastern Uttar Pradesh were a common feature in kingdoms in western and northern India. They were also later recruited by the Marathas and the British. In southern India, there is a caste/community of mercenaries in the state of Karnataka which is called Bunt. The word "bunt" itself translates to warrior or mercenary, this community later elevated itself as the rulers of the land, several powerful dynasties emerged from this community. The most notable dynasty being the Alupas of Dakshina Kannada, which reigned for 1,300 years. This community still survives and has adopted the surnames shetty, Rai, Alva, chowta etc. In Tamil Nadu, the three crowned empires used the Kongar pastro-peasantry tribes of the Kongunad region and the Kongar peasant tribes of the Erumainad region as their swordsman mercenaries, cavalry mercenaries, and as chariot soldier mercenaries, as well as personal guards. Kongars worked along with the three empires' warrior tribes such as the Kallar, Maravar, Aghamudaiyar, Parkavar, Valaiya-Mutharaiyar, and Mazhavar tribes. During that time, these Kongar tribes were led only by the chiefs of their own tribe and would not come under the command of the emperor or his military general. Though these Kongar tribes of Kongunad were feudatories to the three crowned empires, Kongunad was divided into 24 subdivisions and was only ruled by Kongars. However, the Kongars (Gangars) of Erumainad established their own empire, the Western Ganga dynasty, and ruled over it for centuries. Kongar tribes still exist in the modern world, where they are referred as Kongu Vellala Gounder (Kongunadu) and Gangadhikar Vokkaliga Gowda (Erumainad).

The Mukkuvar clan of Malabar Coast and Sri Lankan coast did the role of soldiers in Kalinga Magha's invasion to Sri Lanka and in Nair's battle with the Dutch in the Battle of Colachel.

In the 18th and early 19th centuries, the imperial Mughal power was crumbling and other powers, including the Sikh Misls and Maratha chiefs, were emerging. At this time, a number of mercenaries, arriving from several countries found employment in India. Some of the mercenaries emerged to become independent rulers. The Sikh Maharaja, Ranjit Singh, known as the "Lion of the Punjab", employed Euro-American mercenaries such as the Neapolitan Paolo Avitabile; the Frenchmen Claude Auguste Court and Jean-François Allard; and the Americans Josiah Harlan and Alexander Gardner. The Sikh army, Dal Khalsa, was trained by Singh's French mercenaries to fight alone the lines used by the French in the Napoleonic era, and following French practice, Dal Khalsa had excellent artillery. Singh had a low opinion of his Euro-American mercenaries, once saying "German, French or English, all these European bastards are alike".

Until 1858, India was a proprietary colony that belonged to the East India Company, not the British Crown. The East India Company became the world's most influential corporation, having exclusive monopolies on trade with India and China. By the early 19th century, the East India Company in its proprietary colony of India ruled over 90 million Indians and controlled 70 million acres (280,000 km^{2}) of land under its own flag, issued its own currency and maintained its own civil service and its own army of 200,000 men led by officers trained at its officer school, giving the company an army larger than that possessed by most European states. In the 17th century, the East India Company recruited Indian mercenaries to guard its warehouses and police the cities under its rule. However, these forces were ad hoc and disbanded as quickly as they were recruited.

Starting in 1746, the Company recruited Indian mercenaries into its own army. By 1765, the board of directors of the Company had come to accept it was necessary to rule its conquests to maintain a standing army, voting to maintain three presidency armies to be funded by taxes on Indian land. The number of Indians working for the Company's armies outnumbered the Europeans ten to one. When recruiting, the East India Company tended to follow Indian prejudices in believing the pale-skinned men from northern India made for better soldiers than the dark-skinned peoples of southern India, and that high-caste Hindus were superior to the low-caste Hindus. Despite these prejudices, the men of the Madras Army were from south India. The Bengal Army were largely high-cast Hindus from northern India while the Bombay Army prided itself on being a "melting pot".

Because the East India Company ultimately by the end of the 18th century came to offer higher pay than the Maharajahs did, and offered the novelty in India of paying a pension to veterans and their families, it came to attract the best of the Indian mercenaries. Initially, the mercenaries serving in the company's armies brought along their own weapons, which was the normal practice in India, but after the 1760s the company began to them arm with the standard British weapons. The East India Company, generally known in both Britain and in India as "the Company", had sufficient lobbying power in London to ensure that several British Army regiments were also stationed to work alongside the Company army, whose troops were mostly "Sepoys" (Indians). The Company never entirely trusted the loyalty of its sepoys. The company had its own officer training school at the Addiscombe Military Seminary. The company's armies were trained in the Western style and by the end of the 18th century its troops were ranked as the equal of any European army.

=== Latin America ===
==== Nicaragua ====
In 1855, during a civil war in Nicaragua between the Conservatives and Liberals, the latter recruited an American adventurer named William Walker who promised to bring 300 mercenaries to fight for the Liberals. Through Walker only brought 60 mercenaries with him, to be joined by another 100 Americans together with the Belgian mercenary Charles Frederick Henningsen who were already in Nicaragua, he was able to defeat the Conservatives at the Battle of La Virgen on 4 September 1855 and by 13 October, Walker had taken Grenada, the Conservative capital. After his victories, Walker became the de facto dictator of Nicaragua, which many both inside and outside of the country soon started to call "Walkeragua".

At the time, Nicaragua was an extremely important transit point between the Western and Eastern United States. In the days before the Panama Canal and the first transcontinental railroad, ships from the Eastern United States would sail up the San Juan River to Lake Nicaragua, where passengers and goods were unloaded at the port of Rivas and then made the short journey via stagecoach to the Pacific coast, to be loaded onto ships that would take them to the west coast of the United States. One of the most important companies of the Nicaraguan stagecoach business was the Accessory Transit Company owned by Commodore Cornelius Vanderbilt of New York. Walker confiscated the Accessory Transit Company's assets in Nicaragua, which he handed over to the Morgan & Garrison company, owned by rivals of Vanderbilt. As Vanderbilt happened to be the richest man in the United States, he launched a lobbying campaign against Walker in Washington, D.C., and was able to pressure President Franklin Pierce into withdrawing American recognition of Walker's regime.

Once it was understood that the US government was no longer supporting Walker, Costa Rica invaded Nicaragua with the aim of deposing Walker, whose ambitions were felt to be a threat to all of Central America. The Costa Ricans defeated Walker at the Battle of Santa Rosa and the Second Battle of Rivas. The beleaguered Walker sought to appeal to support in his native South by restoring slavery in Nicaragua, making English the official language, changing the immigration law to favor Americans, and declaring his ultimate intention was to bring Nicaragua into the United States as a slave state. By this point, Walker had thoroughly alienated public opinion in Nicaragua while he was besieged in Grenada by a coalition of Guatemalan, Salvadorian, and Costa Rican troops. The decision by Henningsen to burn down Grenada enraged Nicaraguan people and in March 1857, Walker, with his dreams of an empire in tatters, fled Nicaragua.

In the 1980s, one of the Reagan administration's foreign policy was to overthrow the left-wing Sandinista government by arming guerrillas known as the Contras. Between 1982 and 1984, Congress passed the three Boland amendments which limited the extent of American aid to the Contra rebels. By the late 1970s, the popularity of magazines such as Soldier of Fortune, which glorified the mercenary subculture, led to the opening of numerous camps in the United States designed to train men to be mercenaries and also to serve as guerrillas in case of a Soviet conquest of the United States. The vast majority of the men who trained in these camps were white men who saw para-military training as a way to "reverse the previous twenty years of American history and take back all the symbolic territory that has been lost" as the possibility of becoming mercenaries gave them "the fantastic possibility of escaping their present lives, being reborn as warrior and remaking the world".

Owing to the legal problems posed by the Boland amendments, the Reagan administration turned to the self-proclaimed mercenaries to arm and train the Contra guerrillas. In 1984, the CIA created the Civilian Military Assistance (CMA) group to aid the Contras. The CMA were led by a white supremacist from Alabama named Tom Posey, who like all of the other members of the CMA were graduates of the mercenary training camps. John Negroponte, the American ambassador to Honduras, arranged for permission to be given for the CMA to operate from Honduran territory. However, the operation collapsed later in 1984 when the Nicaraguans shot down a CMA plane carrying arms to the Contras, killing two Americans. Sam Hall, a self proclaimed mercenary hero and "counter-terrorist" who joined the CMA entered Nicaragua with the aim of performing sabotage operations. In 1986, Hall was captured by the Sandinistas, who held him for four months before releasing him under the grounds that he was not a mercenary, but rather a mercenary imposer. John K. Singlaub who worked alongside Hall described him as suffering from a "Walter Mitty type complex".

==== Colombia ====
In 1994, President César Gaviria of Colombia signed Decree 356, which allowed wealthy landowners to recruit private armies of their own and liberalised the law on settling up PMCs in order to fight the Communist FARC (Fuerzas Armadas Revolucionarias de Colombia – Revolutionary Armed Forces of Colombia) guerrillas. As a result of Decree 356, by 2014 Colombia had 740 PMCs operating, more than anywhere else in the world. Increasingly Colombian mercenaries have been hired by American PMCs as being cheaper than American mercenaries. The government of the United Arab Emirates has hired Colombian mercenaries to fight its war in Yemen.

=== Africa ===
==== Ancient Africa ====
An early recorded use of foreign auxiliaries dates back to ancient Egypt, the thirteenth century BC, when Pharaoh Ramesses II used 11,000 mercenaries during his battles. A long established foreign corps in the Egyptian forces were the Medjay—a generic term given to tribal scouts and light infantry recruited from Nubia serving from the late period of the Old Kingdom through that of the New Kingdom. Other warriors recruited from outside the borders of Egypt included Libyan, Syrian and Canaanite contingents under the New Kingdom and Sherdens from Sardinia who appear in their distinctive horned helmets on wall paintings as body guards for Ramesses II. Celtic mercenaries were greatly employed in the Greek world (leading to the sack of Delphi and the Celtic settlement of Galatia). The Greek rulers of Ptolemaic Egypt, too, used Celtic mercenaries. Carthage was unique for relying primarily on mercenaries to fight its wars, particularly Gaul and Spanish mercenaries.

==== 19th and 20th centuries ====
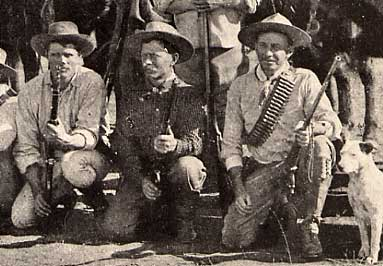
Frederick Russell Burnham in Africa

In the 20th century, mercenaries in conflicts on the continent of Africa have in several cases brought about a swift end to bloody civil war by comprehensively defeating the rebel forces. There have been a number of unsavory incidents in the brushfire wars of Africa, some involving recruitment of European and American men "looking for adventure".

Many of the adventurers in Africa who have been described as mercenaries were in fact ideologically motivated to support particular governments, and would not fight "for the highest bidder". An example of this was the British South Africa Police (BSAP), a paramilitary, mounted infantry force formed by the British South Africa Company of Cecil Rhodes in 1889–1890 that evolved and continued until 1980.

Famous mercenaries in Africa include:

- Frederick Russell Burnham was an American scout for the British South Africa Company who served in both the First Matabele War (1893–94) and the Second Matabele War (1896–97). He effectively ended the Second Matabele War by assassinating the Ndebele religious leader, Mlimo, but Burnham is best known in this war for teaching American Frontier scouting to Robert Baden-Powell and inspiring him to found the boy scouts. In the Second Boer War (1900–1904), Burnham served as Chief of Scouts to the British Army. He was presented the Cross of the Distinguished Service Order for his heroism and given a commission as Major in the British Army by King Edward VII personally even though he declined to renounce his American citizenship. Burnham's real-life adventures also heavily influenced H. Rider Haggard who created the fictional Allan Quatermain adventurer, a character who later was transformed by George Lucas into Indiana Jones.
- Mike Hoare was a British career soldier who served with distinction in the London Irish Rifles during World War II. He later emigrated to South Africa, and was contracted by the State of Katanga in the early 1960s to form "4 Commando (Force Katangaise)", a unit of foreign military advisers in the local gendarmerie. Most of Hoare's recruits were Belgians or South Africans. After Katanga's integration in 1963, Hoare remained active in Congo affairs. He was solicited by General Joseph-Desiré Mobutu in 1964 to form "5 Commando" – a second mercenary force raised to crush the Simba Rebellion, which included European adventurers of at least twenty nationalities. Hoare later resurfaced in 1981, shortly after France-Albert René's ascension in the Seychelles, attempting to carry out a coup d'état on behalf of former president James Mancham. His troops were intercepted shortly after debarking on Mahé and only escaped by hijacking an Air India Boeing, which they flew to Durban.
- Bob Denard was a former French intelligence operative, policeman, and dedicated anti-communist who saw action during the First Indochina War and Algerian War of Independence. After a brief inroad into civilian life, Denard returned to military service with the Katangese gendarmerie in 1961. Refusing to surrender when secessionist forces collapsed in January 1963, he disappeared into Angola with a nucleus of other die-hards and sought work training North Yemen royalists before returning to the Congo at the request of then-Prime Minister Moise Tshombe. Denard formed his own unit to fight the Simba Rebellion, les affreux, who were also instrumental in suppressing an attempted coup d'état in 1966. Dismissed by Congolese president Joseph Kasa Vubu, the French mercenary joined the Kisangani Mutinies and was wounded in action. He later went on to serve as a military adviser to several African governments, including Gabon and Rhodesia. Denard has since carried out five attempted coup d'etats in Benin and the Comoros Islands, three of them successful.
- Neall Ellis was a South African aviator who achieved prominence for his extensive action in Sierra Leone's long-running civil war. Ellis was raised in Bulawayo, Rhodesia (Zimbabwe), but after an unsuccessful career in the Rhodesian Army, emigrated to join the South African Air Force. During the South African Border War, he flew improvised Aérospatiale Alouette III and Atlas Oryx gunships over Angola and Mozambique in support of South African expeditionary forces conducting external raids. He retired a colonel upon the end of apartheid, piloting Yugoslav Mil Mi-8s as an operational freelancer. In 1998, Ellis returned to participate in the Angolan Civil War with private military firm Executive Outcomes, which eventually dispatched him to Sierra Leone. During the Battle for Freetown, he was instrumental in fighting off Revolutionary United Front insurgents from a Mil Mi-24 Hind and providing air support for British forces executing Operation Barras. He has founded his own paramilitary company, Jesa Air West Africa, and continues to fly helicopters for Iraq and Somalia.
- Simon Mann was found guilty in Zimbabwe of "attempting to buy weapons" (BBC 27 August) allegedly for a coup in Equatorial Guinea in 2004 (see below).

===== Congo Crisis =====
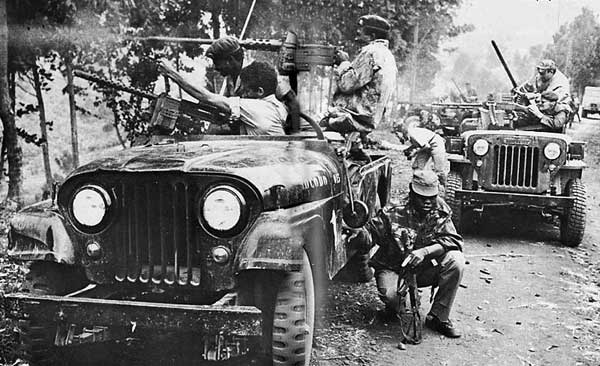
White mercenaries fighting alongside Congolese troops in 1964

The Congo Crisis (1960–1965) was a period of turmoil in the First Republic of the Congo that began with national independence from Belgium and ended with the seizing of power by Joseph Mobutu. During the crisis, mercenaries were employed by various factions, and also at times helped the United Nations and other peace keepers.

In 1960 and 1961, Mike Hoare worked as a mercenary commanding an English-speaking unit called "4 Commando" supporting a faction in Katanga, a province trying to break away from the newly independent Congo under the leadership of Moïse Tshombe. Hoare chronicled his exploits in his book the Road to Kalamata.

In 1964, Tshombe (then Prime Minister of Congo) hired Major Hoare to lead a military unit called "5 Commando" made up of about 300 men, most of whom were from South Africa. The unit's mission was to fight a rebel group called Simbas, who already had captured almost two-thirds of the country.

In Operation Dragon Rouge, "5 Commando" worked in close cooperation with Belgian paratroopers, Cuban exile pilots, and CIA hired mercenaries. The objective of Operation Dragon Rouge was to capture Stanleyville and save several hundred civilians (mostly Europeans and missionaries) who were hostages of the Simba rebels. The operation saved many lives; however, the Operation damaged the reputation of Moïse Tshombe as it saw the return of white mercenaries to the Congo soon after independence and was a factor in Tshombe's loss of support from president of Congo Joseph Kasa-Vubu who dismissed him from his position

At the same time Bob Denard commanded the French-speaking "6 Commando", "Black Jack" Schramme commanded "10 Commando" and William "Rip" Robertson commanded a company of anti-Castro Cuban exiles.

Later, in 1966 and 1967, some former Tshombe mercenaries and Katangese gendarmes staged the Mercenaries' Mutinies.

===== Biafra =====
Mercenaries fought for Biafra in the Fourth Commando Brigade led by Rolf Steiner during the Nigerian Civil War (1967–1970). Other mercenaries flew aircraft for the Biafrans. In October 1967, for example, a Royal Air Burundi DC-4M Argonaut, flown by mercenary Heinrich Wartski, also known as Henry Wharton, crash-landed in Cameroon with military supplies destined for Biafra.

It was hoped that employing mercenaries in Nigeria would have similar impact to the Congo, but the mercenaries proved largely ineffective. The British historian Philip Baxter wrote the principle difference was that the Congolese militias commanded by leaders with almost no military experience were no match for the mercenaries, and by contrast the Sandhurst-trained Nigerian Army officers were of an "altogether higher caliber" than Congolese militia leaders. Through much of the leadership of the Nigerian Army had been killed in two coups in 1966, there were still just enough Sandhust graduates left in 1967 to hold the Nigerian Army together and provide enough of a modicum of military professionalism to defeat the mercenaries. By October 1967, most of the mercenaries who had been expecting easy victories like those won in the Congo had already left Biafra, complaining that the Nigerians were a much tougher opponent who were defeating them in battle.

When asked about the impact of the white mercenaries, General Philip Effiong, the chief of the Biafran general staff replied: "They had not helped. It would have made no difference if not a single one of them came to work for the secessionist forces. Rolf Steiner stayed the longest. He was more of a bad influence than anything else. We were happy to get rid of him." One Biafran officer, Fola Oyewole, wrote about the sacking of Steiner in late 1968: "Steiner's departure from Biafra removed the shine from the white mercenaries, the myth of the white man's superiority in the art of soldiering". Oyewole wrote that the white mercenaries were hated by the ordinary people of Biafra due to their high-handed behavior; a tendency to retreat when it appeared possible the Nigerians were about to cut them off instead of holding their ground; and a fondness for looting, noting that the European mercenaries seemed more interested in stealing as much as possible instead of helping Biafra."

In May 1969, Count Carl Gustaf von Rosen formed a squadron of five light aircraft known as the Babies of Biafra, which attacked and destroyed Nigerian jet aircraft on the ground and delivered food aid. Count von Rosen was assisted by ex-RCAF fighter pilot Lynn Garrison.

===== Angola =====
In 1975, John Banks, an Englishman, recruited mercenaries to fight for the National Liberation Front of Angola (FNLA) against the Popular Movement for the Liberation of Angola (MPLA) in the civil war that broke out when Angola gained independence from Portugal in 1975. In the United States, David Bufkin, a self-proclaimed mercenary hero started a recruiting campaign in Soldier of Fortune magazine calling for anti-Communist volunteers, especially Vietnam veterans, to fight in Angola as mercenaries, claiming to be funded to the tune of $80,000 by the Central Intelligence Agency. Bufkin was in fact a former US Army soldier "who has gone AWOL several times, has been tried for rape, and been in and out of jail several times", did not have $80,000, was not supported by the CIA, instead being a con-man who had stolen most of the money paid to him. Bufkin managed to get a dozen or so American mercenaries to Angola, where several of them were killed in action with the rest being captured.

One of the leaders of the mercenaries was Costas Georgiou (the self-styled "Colonel Callan"), who was described by the British journalist Patrick Brogan as a psychopathic killer who personally executed fourteen of his fellow mercenaries for cowardice, and who was extremely brutal to black people. Within 48 hours of his arrival in Angola, Georgiou had already led his men in disarming and massacring a group of FNLA fighters (his supposed allies), who he killed just for the "fun" of it all. At his trial, it was established that Georgiou had personally murdered at least 170 Angolans. Inept as a military leader as he was brutal, Georgiou notably failed as a commander. It was believed in 1975–76 that recruiting white mercenaries to fight in Angola would have a similar impact that the mercenaries had in the Congo in the 1960s, but in Angola the mercenaries failed completely as Brogan described their efforts as a "debacle". If anything, the white mercenaries with their disdain for blacks, or in the case of Georgiou murderous hatred seemed to have depressed morale on the FNLA side.

Many of the mercenaries in Angola were not former professional soldiers as they claimed to have been, but instead merely fantasists who had invented heroic war records for themselves. The fantasist mercenaries did not know how to use their weapons properly, and often injured themselves and others when they attempted to use weaponry that they did not fully understand, leading to some of them being executed by the psychopathic killer Georgiou who did not tolerate failure. On 27 January 1976, a group of 96 British mercenaries arrived in Angola and within a week about dozen had accidentally maimed themselves by trying to use weapons that they falsely claimed to be proficient with. The MLPA forces were better organized and led, and the dispatch of 35,000 Cuban Army troops in November 1975 decided the war for the MLPA. Cuban accounts of the Angolan war speak of the efforts of the mercenaries in a tone of contempt as Cuban veterans contend that the mercenaries were poor soldiers who they had no trouble defeating.

When captured, John Derek Barker's role as a leader of mercenaries in Northern Angola led the judges to send him to face the firing squad following the Luanda Trial. Nine others were imprisoned. Three more were executed: American Daniel Gearhart was sentenced to death for advertising himself as a mercenary in an American newspaper; Andrew McKenzie and Georgiou, who had both served in the British Army, were sentenced to death for murder. Georgiou was shot by firing squad in 1976. Costas' cousin Charlie Christodoulou was killed in an ambush.

Executive Outcomes employees, Captains Daniele Zanata and Raif St Clair (who was also involved in the 1981 Seychelles coup attempt), fought on behalf of the MPLA against the National Union for the Total Independence of Angola (UNITA) in the 1990s in violation of the Lusaka Protocol.

===== Comoros =====
A major aim of French foreign policy was and still is to maintain the French sphere of influence in what is called Françafrique. In 1975, Ali Soilih took power in the Comoros via a coup, and proved unwilling to accept the French viewpoint that his nation was part of Françafrique. Unhappy with Soilih, the French secret service, the Service de Documentation Extérieure et de Contre-Espionnage in 1978 hired the French mercenary Bob Denard to invade the Comoros to overthrow Soilih. Making the Comoros a tempting target for Denard were its small size, consisting of only three islands in the Indian Ocean. Moreover, Soilih had abolished the Comorian Army, replacing the Army with a militia known as the Moissy, made up mostly of teenage boys with only the most rudimentary military training. The Moissy, which was modeled after the Red Guards in China, existed mainly to terrorize Soilih's opponents and was commanded by a 15-year-old boy, appointed solely because of his blind devotion to Soilih.

On the night of 13 May 1978, Denard and 42 other mercenaries landed on Grande Comore island, annihilated the poorly trained and badly commanded Moissy, none of whom had any military experience, and by the morning the Comoros was theirs. President Soilih was high on marijuana and naked in his bed together with three nude teenage schoolgirls watching a pornographic film, when Denard kicked in the door to his room to inform him that he was no longer president. Soilih was later taken out and shot with the official excuse being that he was "shot while trying to escape". The new president of the Comoros, Ahmed Abdallah, was a puppet leader and the real ruler of the Comoros was Colonel Denard, who brought the Comoros back into Françafrique.

As a ruler, Denard proved himself to be extremely greedy as he rapaciously plundered the Comorian economy to make himself into a very rich man. Denard served as the commander of the Comorian Presidential Guard and became the largest single landowner in the Comoros, developing the best land by the sea into luxury resorts catering to tourists who wanted to enjoy the tropics. Denard converted to Islam (the prevailing religion in the Comoros), and took advantage of the Islamic rules on polygamy to maintain for himself a harem of Comorian women. Officially, France was committed to the United Nations sanctions against the apartheid government of South Africa, which French and South African businesses circumvented via the Comoros, a form of sanctions-busting that was tolerated by Denard as long as he received his cut of the profits.

Ultimately, Denard's antics as the "great white conqueror" of the Comoros and his lavish lifestyle made him into embarrassment for the French government, as there were charges that France was engaged in neo-colonialism in the Comoros. At the same time there were alternatives to Denard in the form of black Comorian politicians who wanted Denard out, but were willing to keep the Comoros in Françafrique, which would allow Paris to achieve its aims without the embarrassment of a white European exploiting a country inhabited by black Africans. When Abdallah tried to dismiss Denard as commander of the Presidential Guard, Denard had him assassinated on 26 November 1989. At that point, the French government, which had an alternative leadership in place, intervened by sending paratroopers to remove Denard and the other mercenaries from the Comoros while installing Said Mohamed Djohar as president.

On 28 September 1995, Denard again invaded the Comoros, but this time, Paris was against the invasion, and staged Operation Azalee – dispatching 600 paratroops to the Comoros to usher Denard and his mercenaries out. Denard was charged in France with the murder of President Abdallah, but was acquitted owing to a lack of evidence. In 2006, he was found guilty of conspiracy to overthrow the government of the Comoros in 1995, but by this point Denard was suffering from Alzheimer's disease and he did not serve a day in prison, instead dying in a Paris hospital on 13 October 2007.

===== Seychelles =====
In 1981, "Mad Mike" Hoare was hired by the government of South Africa to lead an invasion of the Seychelles with the aim of deposing the left-wing President France-Albert René, who had roundly criticized apartheid, and replacing him with a more apartheid-friendly leader. Disguised as a drinking club, Ye Ancient Order of Froth-Blowers, and as rugby players, Hoare led a force of 53 men into the airport at Port Larue on 25 November 1981. Hoare's men failed to make it past the customs at the airport as an alert customs officer noticed one of the "rugby players" had an AK-47 assault rifle hidden in his luggage. What followed was a shoot-out at the airport between Hoare's men and Seychellois customs officers. Realizing the invasion was doomed, Hoare and his men escaped by hijacking an Air India jet which flew them back to South Africa. The fiasco of the Seychelles invasion marked the beginning of the decline of the traditional soldier of fortune, centered around a charismatic figure like Hoare or Denard, and a change over to the corporatized private military company, run by men who shunned the limelight.

===== Eritrea and Ethiopia =====
Both sides hired mercenaries in the Eritrean–Ethiopian War from 1998 to 2000. Russian mercenaries were believed to be flying in the air forces of both sides.

===== Sierra Leone =====
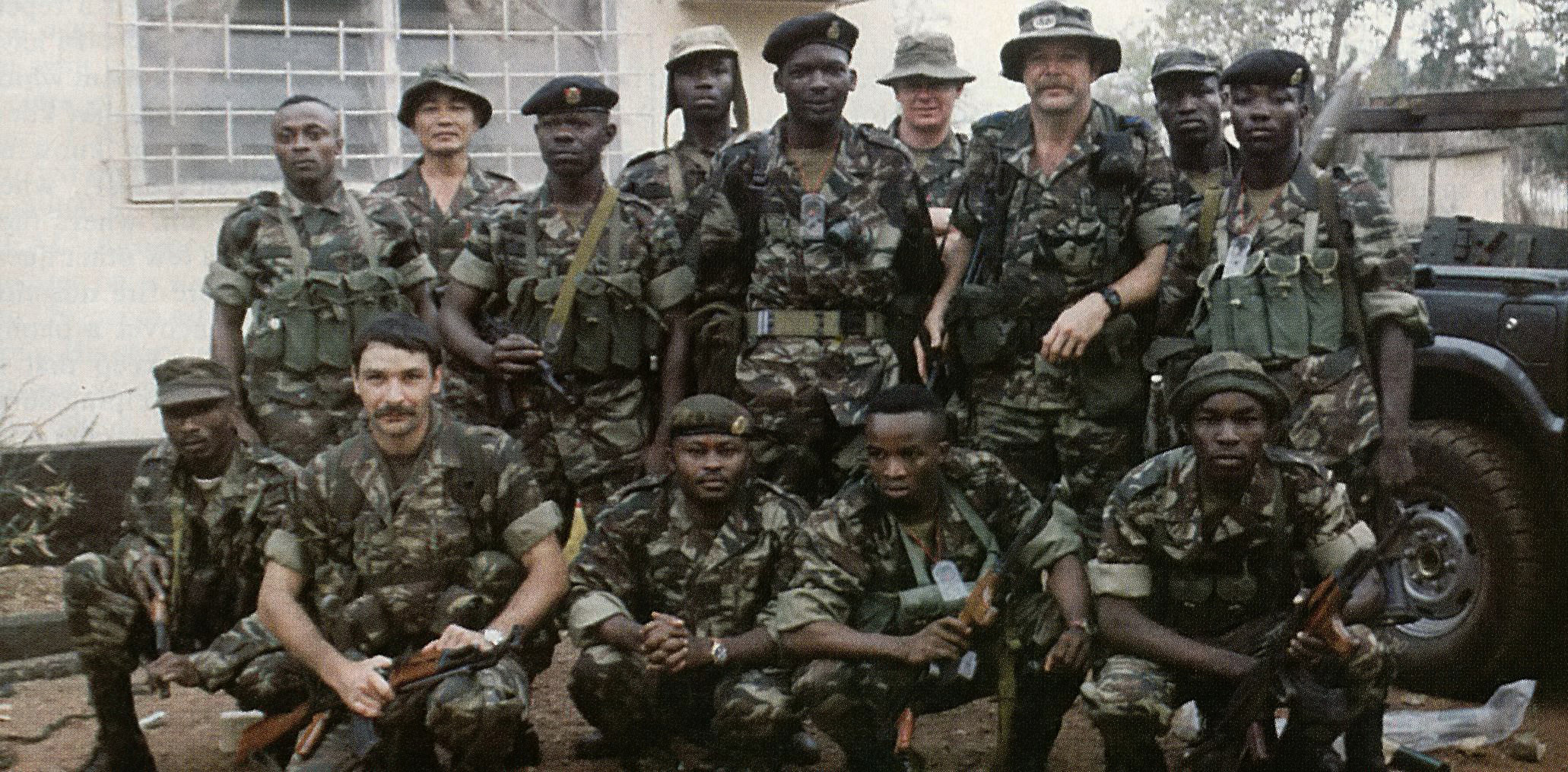
Robert C. MacKenzie (standing, wings on hat) with some of the Sierra Leone Commando Unit he was training with the Gurkha security guards

American Robert C. MacKenzie was killed in the Malal Hills in February 1995, while commanding Gurkha Security Guards (GSG) in Sierra Leone. GSG pulled out soon afterwards and was replaced by Executive Outcomes. Both were employed by the Sierra Leone government as military advisers and to train the government soldiers. It has been alleged that the firms provided soldiers who took an active part in the fighting against the Revolutionary United Front (RUF).

In 2000, the Australian Broadcasting Corporation's (ABC-TV) international affairs program Foreign Correspondent broadcast a special report "Sierra Leone: Soldiers of Fortune", focusing on former 32BN and Recce members who operated in Sierra Leone while serving for SANDF. Officers like De Jesus Antonio, TT D Abreu Capt Ndume and Da Costa were the forefront because of their combat and language skills and also the exploits of South African pilot Neall Ellis and his MI-24 Hind gunship. The report also investigated the failures of the UN Peacekeeping Force, and the involvement of mercenaries and private military contractors in providing vital support to UN operations and British military Special Operations in Sierra Leone in 1999–2000.

===== Equatorial Guinea =====
In August 2004, there was a plot, which later became known as the "Wonga Coup", to overthrow the government of Equatorial Guinea in Malabo. Eight South African apartheid-era soldiers, organised by Neves Matias (former Recce major and De Jesus Antonio former Captain in 2sai BN) with (the leader of whom is Nick du Toit) and five local men were held in Black Beach prison on the island. They were accused of being an advanced guard for a coup to place Severo Moto in power. Six Armenian aircrew, also convicted of involvement in the plot, were released in 2004 after receiving a presidential pardon. CNN reported on 25 August, that:

Defendant Nick du Toit said he was introduced to Thatcher in South Africa last year by Simon Mann, the leader of 70 men arrested in Zimbabwe in March suspected of being a group of mercenaries heading to Equatorial Guinea.

It was planned, allegedly, by Simon Mann, a former SAS officer. On 27 August 2004 he was found guilty in Zimbabwe of purchasing arms, allegedly for use in the plot (he admitted trying to procure dangerous weapons, but said that they were to guard a diamond mine in DR Congo). It is alleged that there is a paper trail from him which implicates Sir Mark Thatcher, Lord Archer, and Ely Calil (a Lebanese-British oil trader).

The BBC reported in an article entitled "Q&A: Equatorial Guinea coup plot":

The BBC's Newsnight television programme saw the financial records of Simon Mann's companies showing large payments to Nick du Toit and also some $2m coming in – though the source of this funding they say is largely untraceable.

The BBC reported on 10 September 2004 that in Zimbabwe:

[Simon Mann], the British leader of a group of 67 alleged mercenaries accused of plotting a coup in Equatorial Guinea has been sentenced to seven years in jail... The other passengers got 12 months in jail for breaking immigration laws while the two pilots got 16 months...The court also ordered the seizure of Mann's $3m Boeing 727 and $180,000 found on board.

===== Libya =====
Muammar Gaddafi in Libya was alleged to have been using mercenary soldiers during the 2011 Libyan civil war, including Tuaregs from various nations in Africa. Many of them had been part of his Islamic Legion created in 1972. Reports say around 800 had been recruited from Niger, Mali, Algeria, Ghana and Burkina Faso. In addition, small numbers of Eastern European mercenaries have also turned up supporting the Gaddafi regime. Most sources have described these troops as professional Serbian veterans of the Yugoslav conflict, including snipers, pilots and helicopter experts. Certain observers, however, speculate that they may be from Poland or Belarus. The latter has denied the claims outright; the former is investigating them. Although the Serbian government has denied that any of their nationals are currently serving as mercenary soldiers in North Africa, five such men have been captured by anti-Gaddafi rebels in Tripoli and several others have also allegedly fought during the Second Battle of Benghazi. a number of unidentified white South African mercenaries were hired to smuggle Gaddafi and his sons to exile in Niger. Their attempts were thwarted by NATO air activity shortly before the death of Libya's ousted strongman. Numerous reports have indicated that the team was still protecting Saif al-Islam Gaddafi shortly before he was apprehended.

Amnesty International has claimed that such allegations against Gaddafi and the Libyan state turned out to either be false or lacking any evidence. Human Rights Watch has indicated that while many foreign migrants were erroneously accused of fighting with Gaddafi, there were also genuine mercenaries from several nations who participated in the conflict.

More recently in 2020 at least several hundred mercenaries from the Russian Wagner Group have been fighting on the side of the warlord, General Khalifa Haftar, whom the government of Russia supports. The Wagner Group mercenaries arrived in Libya in late 2019. The Wagner Group have excelled as snipers, and one result of their arrival was a rapid increase in the number of sniper deaths on the opposing side that holds Tripoli. In response, the government of Turkey hired 2,000 Syrian mercenaries to fight for the opposing faction that it is supporting in the Libyan civil war.

Since 2019, Turkey deployed Syrian mercenaries in the Libya (See: Turkish military intervention in the Second Libyan Civil War). In July 2020 Al Arabiyah reported that Turkey sent Syrian, Tunisian, Egyptian and Sudanese mercenaries into Libya.

A November 2020 report by human rights advocacy group Human Rights Watch claimed that approximately hundreds of Sudanese men were hired by an Emirati security firm Black Shield Security Services as security guards for shopping centres and hotels in the UAE, but were subsequently tricked into fighting in the Libyan Civil War. Reportedly 390 men were recruited from Khartoum, out of which 12 spoke to HRW and told that they were made to live alongside Libyan fighters aligned with UAE-backed General Khalifa Haftar. The recruits were hired to safeguard the oil facilities controlled by the Haftar forces.

=== Middle East ===
==== Egypt ====
By 1807, Muhammad Ali the Great, the Albanian tobacco merchant turned de facto independent Ottoman vali (governor) of Egypt had imported about 400 French mercenaries to train his army. After the end of the Napoleonic wars, Muhammad Ali recruited more mercenaries from all over Europe and the United States to train his army, through French and Italian veterans of the Napoleonic wars were much preferred and formed the largest two groups of mercenaries in Egypt. The most famous of Muhammad Ali's mercenaries was the Frenchman Joseph-Anthelme Sève who set up the first staff school in Egypt and served as the chief of staff to Ibrahim Pasha, the son of the vali and his favorite general. By the 1820s, Muhammad Ali's mercenaries had created a mass conscript army trained to fight in the Western style together with schools for training Egyptian officers and factories for manufacturing Western style weapons as the vali did not wish to be dependent upon imported arms.

Muhammad Ali's grandson, Ismail the Magnificent, who ruled as the Khedive of Egypt between 1863 and 79 recruited mercenaries on large scale. After Napoleon III made an unfavorable arbitration ruling in 1869 about the share of royalties from the newly opened Suez canal, which cost Ismail 3, 000, 000 Egyptian pounds per year, Ismail came to distrust his French mercenaries, and began to look elsewhere. A number of Italian mercenaries such as Romolo Gessi, Gaetamo Casati, Andreanni Somani, and Giacomo Messedaglia played prominent roles in the Egyptian campaigns in the Sudan. Ismail also recruited British mercenaries such as Samuel Baker and the Swiss mercenaries such as Werner Munzinger. After 1869, Ismail recruited 48 American mercenaries to command his army. General Charles Pomeroy Stone, formerly of the United States Army, served as the chief of the Egyptian general staff between 1870 and 1883. Ismail's Americans went to Egypt largely because of the high pay he offered, through several were Confederate veterans who were barred from serving in post-1865 United States Army; the fact that the Americans in Egyptian service had fought on opposing sides in the Civil War was a source of recurring tension as the antagonism between North and South continued in Egypt.

==== Syrian civil war ====
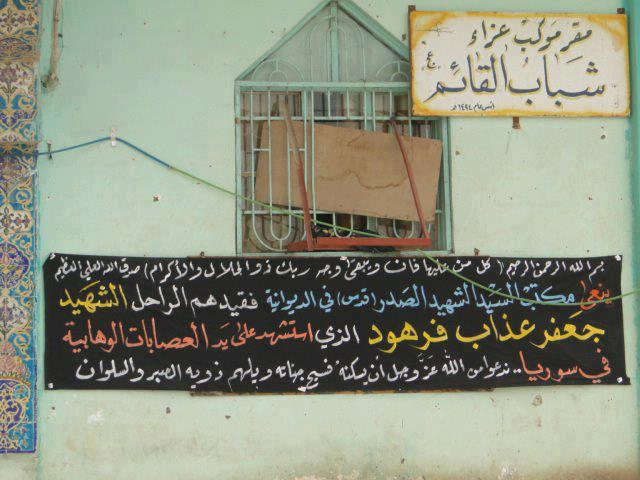
A banner on the wall of the office of the Mahdi Army in Al Diwaniyah, Iraq announcing the killing of one of the militia members in Syria

The Free Syrian Army claimed the Bashar al-Assad regime recruited mercenaries from Iran, Hezbollah militia, and the Iraqi Mahdi Army militia during the Syrian civil war. The Russian government had approved of the deployment in 2016 of the Wagner Group mercenaries to fight for the Syrian government. The Wagner Group is reported to have played an important role in helping to turn the tide of the Syrian civil war in favor of the government, which in 2015 appeared to be close to collapse. On 7 February 2018, the Wagner Group mercenaries were reported to have attacked an American base in Syria together with a pro-Assad militia in what is known as the Battle of Khasham.

Turkey used Syrian mercenaries against the Kurds in Syria.

==== Yemen civil war ====
Multiple mercenary groups, called Popular Committees, which consists of Yemeni tribes loyal to different factions, were formed by both the Hadi government as well as the Houthi Supreme Political Council in the Yemeni Civil War.

==== Saudi Arabian-led intervention in Yemen ====
During Operation Decisive Storm, multiple sources reported that Latin American military contractors from Academi headed by Erik Prince were hired by UAE Armed Forces to assist in the fight against Houthis.

== Notable mercenaries ==
The list includes foreign volunteers, private military contractors, and other "soldiers of fortune" from antiquity to the modern era.

== Cyber mercenary ==
A cyber mercenary is a non-state actor that carries out cyber attacks for nation states for hire. State actors can use cyber mercenaries as a front to try and distance themselves from attacks with plausible deniability.

== See also ==
- Filibuster (military)
- Mercenaries in popular culture
- Mercenary Soldiers' Revolt in Brazil
- Mercenary War (c. 240 BC) – also called the Libyan War and the Truceless War
- Montreux Document
- Private defense agency
- Private intelligence agency
- Privateer
- Rōnin
- Security detail
- Military volunteer
- List of foreign volunteers
- Violent non-state actor

== Sources ==
- Arrian (1976). de Sélincourt, Aubrey (ed.). Anabasis Alexandri (The Campaigns of Alexander). Penguin Books. ISBN 978-0-14-044253-3.
- Bernales-Ballesteros, Enrique; UNHCHR: Special Rapporteur of the Commission on Human Rights on use of mercenaries
- Bodin J; Les Suisses au Service de la France; Editions Albion Michael, 1988. ISBN 2226033343
- Bryant, G. L. (January 2000). "Indigenous Mercenaries in the Service of European Imperialists: The Case of the Sepoys in the Early British Indian Army, 1750–1800". War in History. 7 (1).
- Chartrand, Rene; Louis XV's Army – Foreign Infantry; Osprey 1997. ISBN 185532623X
- Chartrand, Rene; Spanish Army of the Napoleonic Wars 1793–1808; Osprey 1998. ISBN 1855327635
- Goldsworthy, Adrian (2006). The Fall of Carthage: The Punic Wars 265–146 BC. London: Phoenix. ISBN 978-0-304-36642-2.
- Milliard, Todd S.; Overcoming post-colonial myopia: A call to recognize and regulate private military companies (PDF), in Military Law Review Vol 173, June 2003. At the time of publication Major Milliard was a Judge Advocate in the United States Army Judge Advocate General's Corps
- Anthony Mockler, Storia dei mercenari: Da Senofonte all'Iraq. Odoya, 2012. ISBN 978-8862881531.
- Schuster, Carl Otis (2016). "Memnon and Mentor of Rhodes (ca. 380–333, ca. 385–340)". In Phang, Sara E.; Spence, Iain; Kelly, Douglas; Londey, Peter (eds.). Conflict in Ancient Greece and Rome: The Definitive Political, Social, and Military Encyclopedia. ABC-CLIO. ISBN 978-1610690201.
- Scullard, Howard H. (2006) [1989]. "Carthage and Rome". In Walbank, F. W.; Astin, A. E.; Frederiksen, M. W.; Ogilvie, R. M. (eds.). Cambridge Ancient History: Volume 7, Part 2 (2nd ed.). Cambridge: Cambridge University Press. pp. 486–569. ISBN 978-0-521-23446-7.
