= Jean Martinet =

French lieutenant-colonel, Inspector General, and drillmaster

Jean Martinet (d. 1672) was a French lieutenant colonel and Inspector General from 1667 to 1672, and one of the first great drill masters of modern times. Martinet served during the reign of Louis XIV, helping to instill discipline in the aftermath of the 30 Years War and the Franco-Spanish War. He was active during the War of Devolution under the command of the Secretary of State for War, François-Michel le Tellier, Marquis de Louvois He was a severe drillmaster, which made him unpopular among his troops, and "vigorously imposed discipline on both men and officers: henceforward the latter had to obey commands given to them by superior officers regardless of their own social status." Martinet revolutionized the early modern army by instituting a standardized system capable of turning raw recruits into a disciplined fighting force, thereby eliminating the mercenaries, who had been the mainstays of earlier armies. He also introduced the bayonet and the depot system into the French army, which put a stop to the army feeding off the enemy land, making war more humane and effective. The English word martinet derives from the general's last name.

Historical records say that Martinet was eventually killed by friendly fire at the beginning of Franco-Dutch War while leading an infantry assault at the siege of Duisburg.
