= Martinet =

Type of whip or strict person of authority

The martinet (/ˈmɑːrtɪnɪt/) is a punitive device traditionally used in France and other parts of Europe. The word also has other usages, described below.

== Object ==
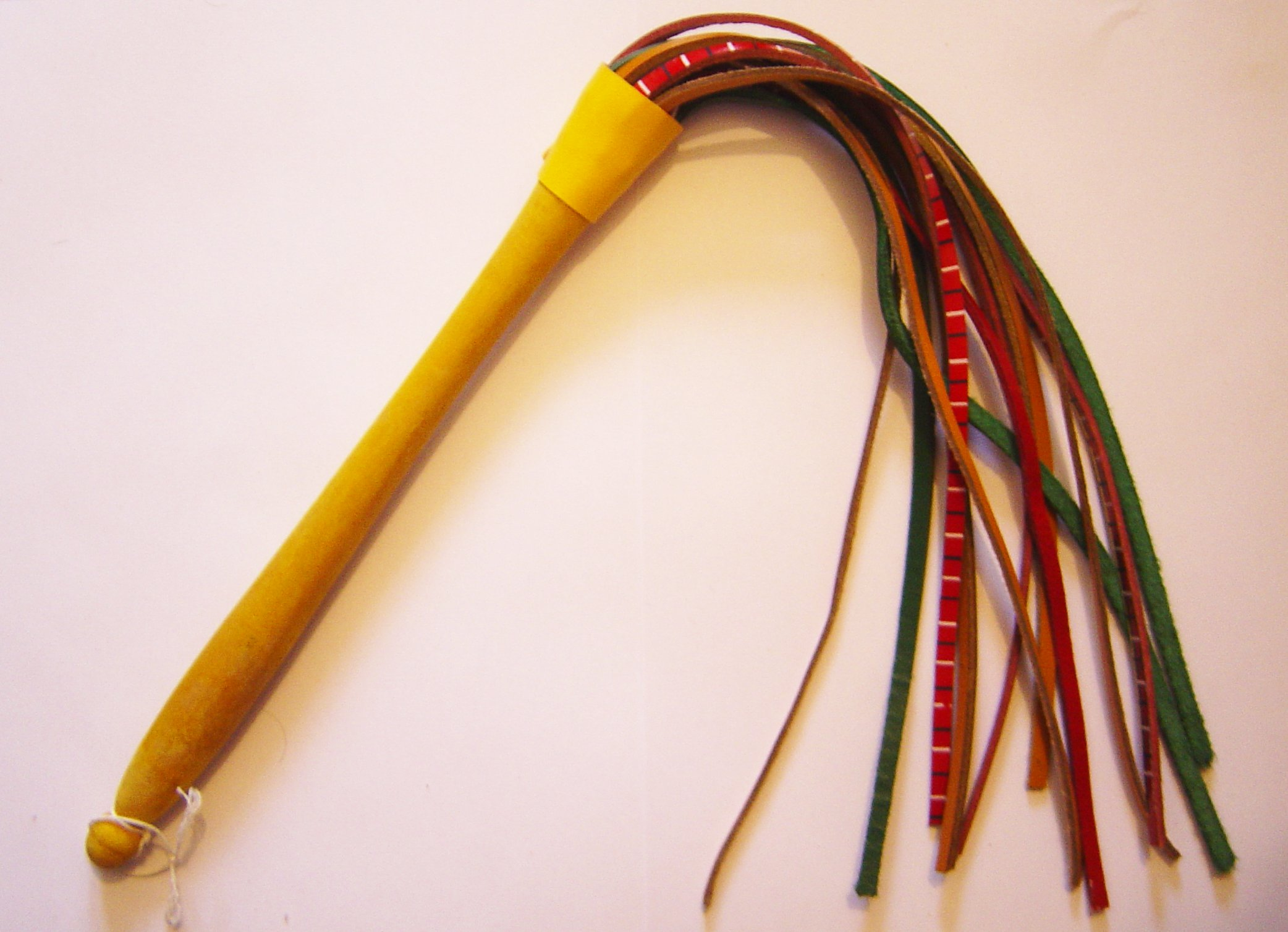
A simple, small martinet

A martinet is a short, scourge-like (multi-tail) type of whip made of a wooden handle of about 25 centimetres (9.8 in) in length and about 10 lashes of equal, relatively short length. The lashes are usually made of leather, but sometimes soap-stiffened cords are used in place of leather. It was a traditional instrument of physical punishment in France and other European countries. In French, it also refers to a similar dusting implement; the type for chastisement was also known as fouet d'enfant, meaning child's whip. The lashes are light, so they are ineffective unless the child is whipped naked. The advantage is they give a stinging pain on bare skin, but will not cause an injury.

The martinet was often applied on the calves, so that the children did not have to disrobe. Otherwise it was usually applied on the bare buttocks, adding humiliation to the physical pain, like the English and Commonwealth caning, birching, naval cat o' nine tails, American paddling, et cetera.

Around 1962, annual production in France was estimated at 300,000 per year. Approximately 33-50% of French households were estimated to currently or formerly own a martinet.

It is now considered abusive to use a martinet to punish children. However, martinets were still sold in the pet section of French supermarkets. Many believe that a large share of those sold are meant for use on children, not pets, or at least to threaten them. Nowadays, however, many supermarkets in France have stopped selling the martinet, even in the pet section.

The martinet is also used as an implement in erotic spanking scenes, hard to distinguish from the flogger, but which is usually lighter.

== Person ==
=== In French ===
The term was used for an external pupil of a collège (i.e., a kind of French high school, especially Catholic). Jean Bodin, quoting the examination of three witches by Paolo Grillandi of Castiglione at the Castello San Paolo, Spoleto, in his writings about demonology records that the witches referred to the Devil as Master Martinet (Maître Martinet), or the Little Master (Petit maître).

=== In English ===
In English, the term martinet usually refers not to the whip but to those who might use it: those who demand strict adherence to set rules and mete out punishment for failing to follow them. This sense of the word is reputedly derived from the name of Jean Martinet, Inspector General of the army of Louis XIV, such that its relationship to the word's earlier sense is merely coincidental.

In an extended sense, a martinet is any person who believes strict adherence to rules and etiquette is paramount. Martinets often use etiquette and other rules as an excuse to trump ethics, to the point that etiquette loses its ethical ground. In 1977, Time magazine famously referred to the Ugandan dictator Idi Amin as a "strutting martinet".

== Other uses ==
A French homonym, from the bird name Martin and suffix -et, is the swift.

== Etymology ==
In French, martinet also means a type of hammer, a diminutive of marteau (from Latin martulus, "little hammer").
