= Paolo Grillandi =

Paolo Grillandi (born c. 1490) was an Italian jurist, from Abruzzo, active as a papal judge in witch trials, from 1517. He was an influential observer of confessions. His book Tractatus de hereticis et sortilegiis (1536), based substantially on his judicial experience, became a standard text on witchcraft and demonology. Other related works are his De Questionibus et tortura tractatus, De relaxatione carceratorum, and the De Lamiis of Gianfrancesco Ponzinibio that was later printed with the Tractatus de hereticis et sortilegiis. James Franklin writes

Grillandus's On the Question and Torture distinguishes between doubtful or hall-full indication, full indication, reputation, rumor, four types of presumption, argument, vehement and nonvehement support, conjecture, the likely, and the notorious, before going on to detail with equal learning the five degrees of torture.
