= Scottish people =

Ethnic group native to Scotland

Total population
- c. 28 – c. 40 million

Regions with significant populations
- Scotland 4,226,965 (2022) identifying as Scottish descent only
- Significant Scottish diaspora in
- United States: 8,422,613 (Scottish)^{A} 794,478 (Scots-Irish)
- Canada: 4,799,005 (2016)^{B}
- Australia: 2,176,777 (2021)^{C}
- New Zealand: 1,000,000–2,000,000 (Scottish descent); 25,953 Scottish-born
- England: 795,000
- Argentina: 100,000
- South Africa: 11,160 (estimate)
- Isle of Man: 2,403
- Hong Kong: 1,459^{E}

Languages
- Scottish English; Scots; Scottish Gaelic; British Sign Language

Religion
- Presbyterianism; Catholicism; Episcopalianism; Irreligion other minority groups
- Data based on official census data of populations.: ^{A} Scottish Americans and Scotch-Irish Americans; ^{B} Scottish Canadians; ^{C} Scottish Australians; ^{D} Scottish-born people in England only; ^{E} Number of people born in Scotland.

Scottish people or Scots (Scots: Scots fowk; Scottish Gaelic: Albannaich) are an ethnic group and nation native to Scotland. Historically, they emerged in the early Middle Ages from an amalgamation of two Celtic peoples, the Picts and Gaels, who founded the Kingdom of Scotland (or Alba) in the 9th century. In the following two centuries, Celtic-speaking Cumbrians of Strathclyde and Germanic-speaking Angles of Northumbria became part of Scotland. In the High Middle Ages, during the 12th-century Davidian Revolution, small numbers of Norman nobles migrated to the Lowlands. In the 13th century, the Norse-Gaels of the Western Isles became part of Scotland, followed by the Norse of the Northern Isles in the 15th century.

In modern usage, "Scottish people" or "Scots" refers to anyone whose linguistic, cultural, family ancestral or genetic origins are from Scotland. The Latin word Scoti originally referred to the Gaels, but came to describe all inhabitants of Scotland. Considered pejorative by some, the term Scotch has also been used for Scottish people, now primarily outwith Scotland.

People of Scottish descent live in many countries. Emigration, influenced by factors such as the Highland and Lowland Clearances, Scottish emigration to various locales throughout the British Empire, and latterly industrial decline and unemployment, have resulted in the spread of Scottish languages and culture. Large populations of Scottish people settled the 'New World' lands of North and South America, Australia and New Zealand. The highest concentrations of people of Scottish descent in the world outside of Scotland are in Nova Scotia and Prince Edward Island in Canada, Otago and Southland in New Zealand, the Falkland Islands, and Northern Ireland in the United Kingdom. Canada has the highest level of Scottish descendants per capita in the world and the second-largest population of Scottish descendants, after the United States.

== Etymology ==
Originally the Romans used Scotia to refer to Ireland. The Venerable Bede (c. 672 or 673 – 27 May, 735) uses the word Scottorum for the nation from Ireland who settled part of the Pictish lands: "Scottorum nationem in Pictorum parte recipit." This can be inferred to mean the arrival of the people, also known as the Gaels, in the Kingdom of Dál Riata, in the western edge of Scotland. Bede used the word natio (nation) for the Scots, where he often refers to other peoples, such as the Picts, with the word gens (race). In the 10th-century Anglo-Saxon Chronicle, the word Scot is mentioned as a reference to the "Land of the Gaels". The word Scottorum was again used by an Irish king in 1005: Imperator Scottorum was the title given to Brian Bóruma by his notary, Mael Suthain, in the Book of Armagh. This style was subsequently copied by the Scottish kings. Basileus Scottorum appears on the great seal of King Edgar (1074–1107). Alexander I (c. 1078–1124) used the words Rex Scottorum on his great seal, as did many of his successors up to and including James VI.

In modern times, the words Scot and Scottish are applied mainly to inhabitants of Scotland. The possible ancient Irish connotations are largely forgotten. The language known as Ulster Scots, spoken in parts of northeastern Ireland, is the result of 17th- and 18th-century immigration to Ireland from Scotland.

In the English language, the word Scotch is a term to describe a thing from Scotland, such as Scotch whisky. However, when referring to people, the preferred term is Scots. Many Scottish people find the term Scotch to be offensive when applied to people. The Oxford Dictionary describes Scotch as an old-fashioned term for "Scottish".

== Scottish ethnic and cultural groups ==
=== History of ethnogeneses ===
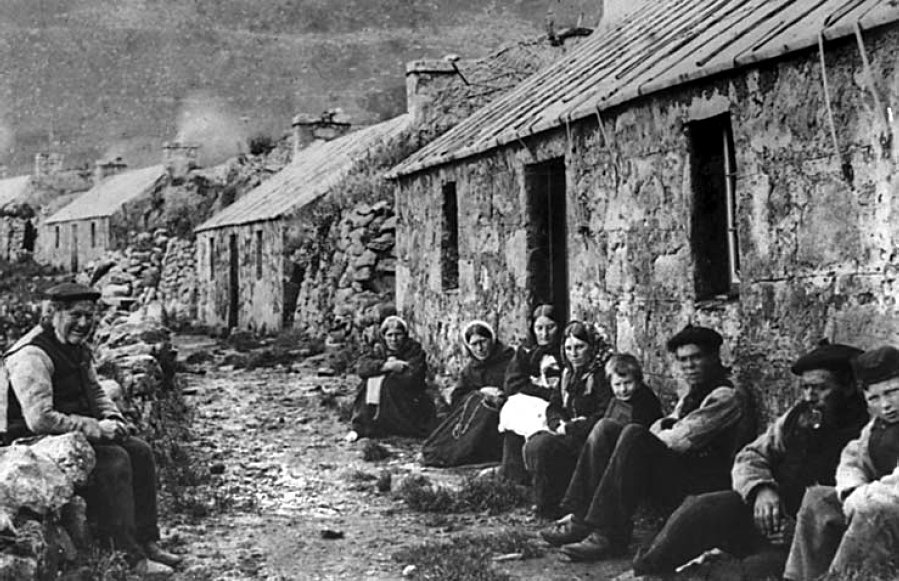
St. Kildans sitting on the village street Victorian-era Property of the National Trust for Scotland taken in 1886.

In the Early Middle Ages, Scotland saw several ethnic or cultural groups mentioned in contemporary sources, namely the Picts, the Gaels, the Britons, and the Angles, with the last of these settling in the southeast of the country. Culturally, these peoples are grouped according to language. Most of Scotland until the 13th century spoke Celtic languages, and these included, at least initially, the Britons, as well as the Gaels and the Picts. Germanic peoples included the Angles of Northumbria, who settled in south-eastern Scotland in the region between the Firth of Forth to the north and the River Tweed to the south. They also occupied the southwest of Scotland up to and including the Plain of Kyle. Their language, Old English, was the earliest form of the language which eventually became known as Scots.

Use of the Gaelic language spread through nearly the whole of Scotland by the 9th century, reaching a peak in the 11th to 13th centuries, but was never the language of the south-east of the country. King Edgar divided the Kingdom of Northumbria between Scotland and England; at least, most medieval historians now accept the 'gift' by Edgar. In any case, after the later Battle of Carham the Scottish kingdom encompassed many English people, with even more quite possibly arriving after the Norman invasion of England in 1066. South-east of the Firth of Forth, then in Lothian and the Borders (OE: Loðene), a northern variety of Old English, also known as Early Scots, was spoken.

As a result of David I, King of Scots' return from exile in England in 1113, ultimately to assume the throne in 1124 with the help of Anglo-Norman military force, David invited Anglo-Norman families from France and England to settle in lands he granted them to spread a ruling class loyal to him. This Davidian Revolution, as many historians call it, brought a European style of feudalism to Scotland along with an influx of people of French descent – by invitation, unlike England where it was by conquest. To this day, many of the common family names of Scotland can trace ancestry to Normans from this period, such as the Stewarts, the Bruces, the Hamiltons, the Wallaces and the Melvilles.

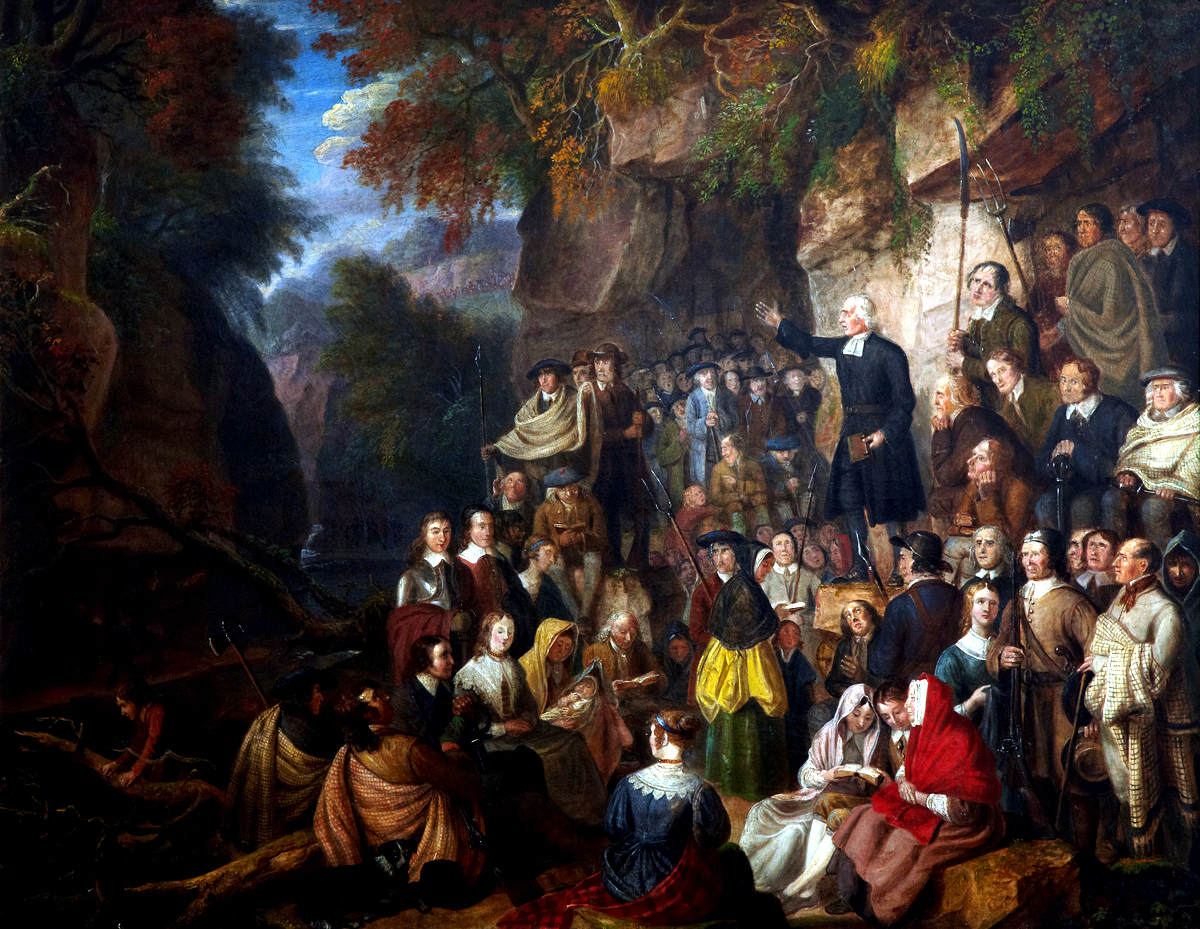
The Covenanters were members of a 17th-century Scottish religious and political movement

The Northern Isles and some parts of Caithness were Norn-speaking (the west of Caithness was Gaelic-speaking into the 20th century, as were some small communities in parts of the Central Highlands). From 1200 to 1500, the Early Scots language spread across the lowland parts of Scotland between Galloway and the Highland line, being used by Barbour in his historical epic The Brus in the late 14th century in Aberdeen.

From 1500 on, Scotland was commonly divided by language into two groups of people, Gaelic-speaking "Highlanders" (the language formerly called Scottis by English speakers and known by many Lowlanders in the 18th century as "Erse") and the Inglis-speaking "Lowlanders" (a language later to be called Scots). However, movement between the two regions increased over the last few centuries. Highlanders moved to major cities (e.g. Glasgow and Edinburgh) and regions bordering the southern Highlands (e.g. Lowland Stirlingshire and Perthshire). This is evidenced by people with traditional Gaelic surnames (including anglicised varieties) currently living in these areas. Lowlanders also settled in Highland regions such as Moray, which was traditionally Gaelic-speaking but replaced with Doric in the 19th century. The Scottish Travellers use of Scottish Cant among themselves declined sharply in the 20th century, even if some terms found their way into youth and everyday language and the Gaelic-based Beurla Reagaird is all but extinct. Today, immigrants have brought other languages, such as Polish, Punjabi and Urdu, but almost every adult throughout Scotland is fluent in the English language.

=== Constructs of a unitary ethnicity ===
Historian Susan Reynolds has put forward how, since the Middle Ages, there have been attempts to obfuscate the ethnic plurality of Scottish people due to the political practicalities of nation building. Academics have explored how 15th and 16th-century Scottish poets and orators, such as Blind Harry, constructed terms such as 'trew Scottis' in an effort to diminish differences between the ethnic groups living within Scotland in the popular consciousness.

A 1974 International Political Science Association report defined this ethnic plurality in Scotland as the following: "The basic ethnic and cultural division in the British Isles has been that between the Anglo-Saxon peoples of England and the Scottish Lowlands and the Celtic peoples of Wales, Ireland and the Scottish Highlands.

In 2014, historian Steven L. Danver, who specialises in indigenous ethnic research, wrote regarding Lowlands Scots and Gaelic Scots' unique ancestries: "The people of Scotland are divided into two groups - Lowland Scots in the southern part of the country and Highland Scots in the north - that differ from one another ethnically, culturally, and linguistically ... Lowlanders differ from Highlanders in their ethnic origin. While Highland Scots are of Celtic (Gaelic) descent, Lowland Scots are descended from people of Germanic stock. During the seventh century C.E., settlers of Germanic tribes of Angles moved from Northumbria in present-day northern England and southeastern Scotland to the area around Edinburgh. Their descendants gradually occupied all of the Lowlands."

Knox College's Stuart Macdonald, who specialises in early modern Scottish history, writes that during the 18th and 19th centuries, the people of Scotland remained grouped into multiple ethnicities:

To speak of Scots as a single ethnic group is also somewhat problematic. It would be more accurate in the eighteenth and nineteenth centuries to talk of two distinct Scottish ethnic communities divided by language and culture, and, at times, mutual antagonisms – Highlanders and Lowlanders.

With regard to the period spanning the 16th century to the 18th century, sociologist Ian Carter's research into marriage patterns found little intermarrying between the groups.

== Scottish diaspora ==
Numbers of the Scottish diaspora
Year (Note: Year the official census was taken.)	Country	Population	% of local population
2016	Canada	4,799,005	15.1
2021	Australia	2,176,777	8.4
2020	United States	8,422,613	3.6
2011	England	708,872	1.34
2020	United States	3,257,161 (scotch-Irish)	1.1

Today, Scotland has a population of just over five million people, the majority of whom consider themselves Scottish. It is estimated around 40 million people worldwide claim Scottish ancestry, particularly in Australia, New Zealand, continental Europe, the United States and Canada, along with elsewhere in the United Kingdom.

Scots have travelled internationally for centuries, helping to build Scotland's international reputation and the promotion of Scottish culture, music, literature and art. The Scottish Government uses the term "Scottish connections" when described Scottish diaspora, and recognises Scottish connections as people of Scottish heritage (by ancestry, marriage or other family connection), lived diaspora (those who moved to Scotland to permanently reside at any time for any reason), educational diaspora (alumni of Scottish educational institutions, and Scots studying or working in international institutions) and affinity (individuals who associate themselves with a connection to Scotland. This connection may be active through cultural, linguistic, friendship, or professional links, or who may simply be interested Scotland's heritage or culture).

=== United States ===
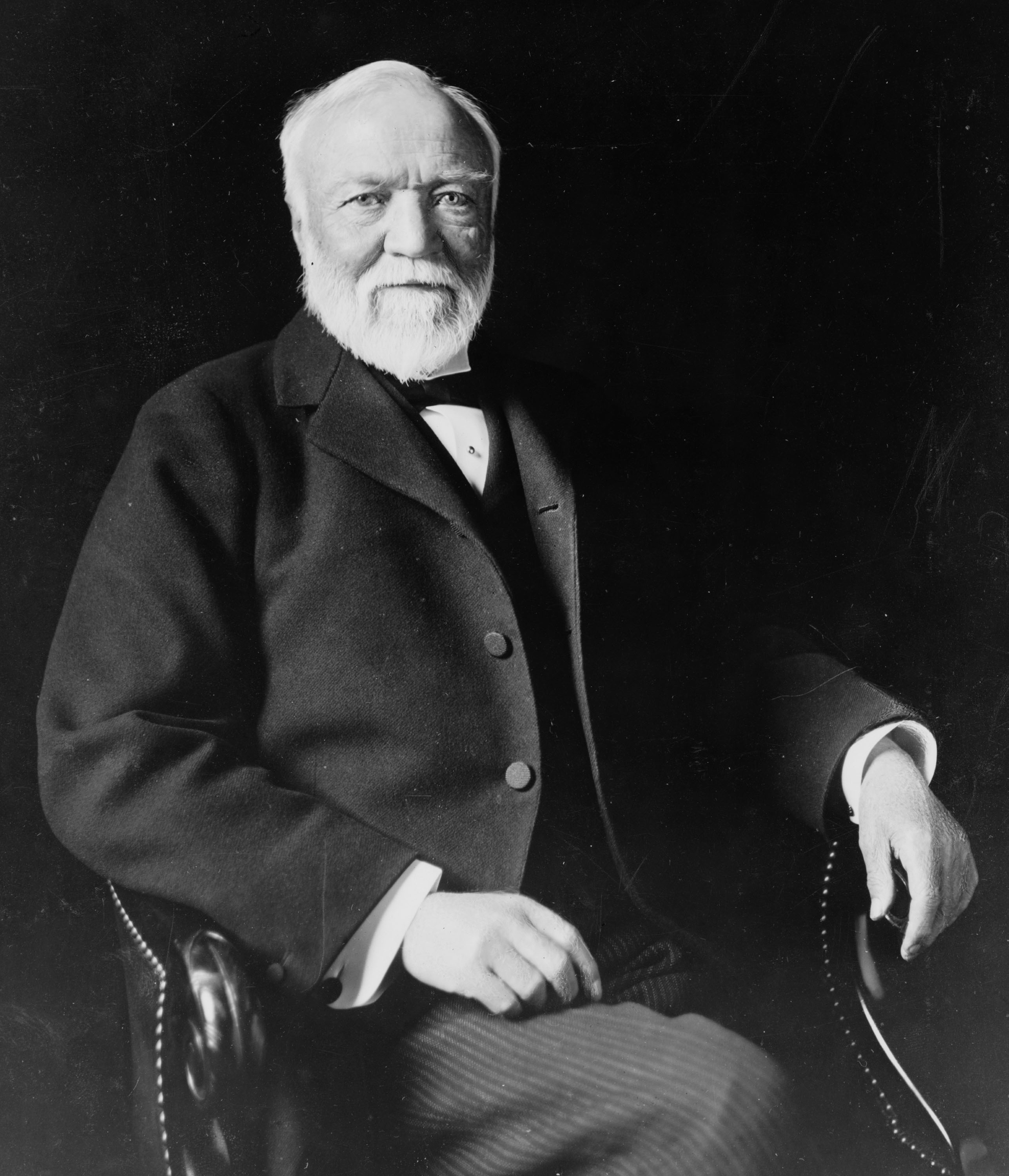
Scottish-born American industrialist and philanthropist Andrew Carnegie

The majority of Scotch-Irish Americans originally came from Lowland Scotland and Northern England before migrating to the province of Ulster in Ireland (see Plantation of Ulster) and thence, beginning about five generations later, to North America in large numbers during the eighteenth century.

In the 2000 census, 4.8 million Americans self-reported Scottish ancestry, 1.7% of the total U.S. population. Over 4.3 million self-reported Scotch-Irish ancestry, for a total of 9.2 million Americans self-reporting some kind of Scottish descent. Self-reported numbers are regarded by demographers as massive under-counts, because Scottish ancestry is known to be disproportionately under-reported among the majority of mixed ancestry, and because areas where people reported "American" ancestry were the places where, historically, Scottish and Scotch-Irish Protestants settled in North America (that is: along the North American coast, Appalachia, and the Southeastern United States). Scottish Americans descended from nineteenth-century Scottish emigrants tend to be concentrated in the West, while many in New England are the descendants of emigrants, often Gaelic-speaking, from the Maritime Provinces of Canada, from the 1880s onward. Americans of Scottish descent outnumber the population of Scotland, where 4,459,071 or 88.09% of people identified as ethnic Scottish in the 2001 Census.

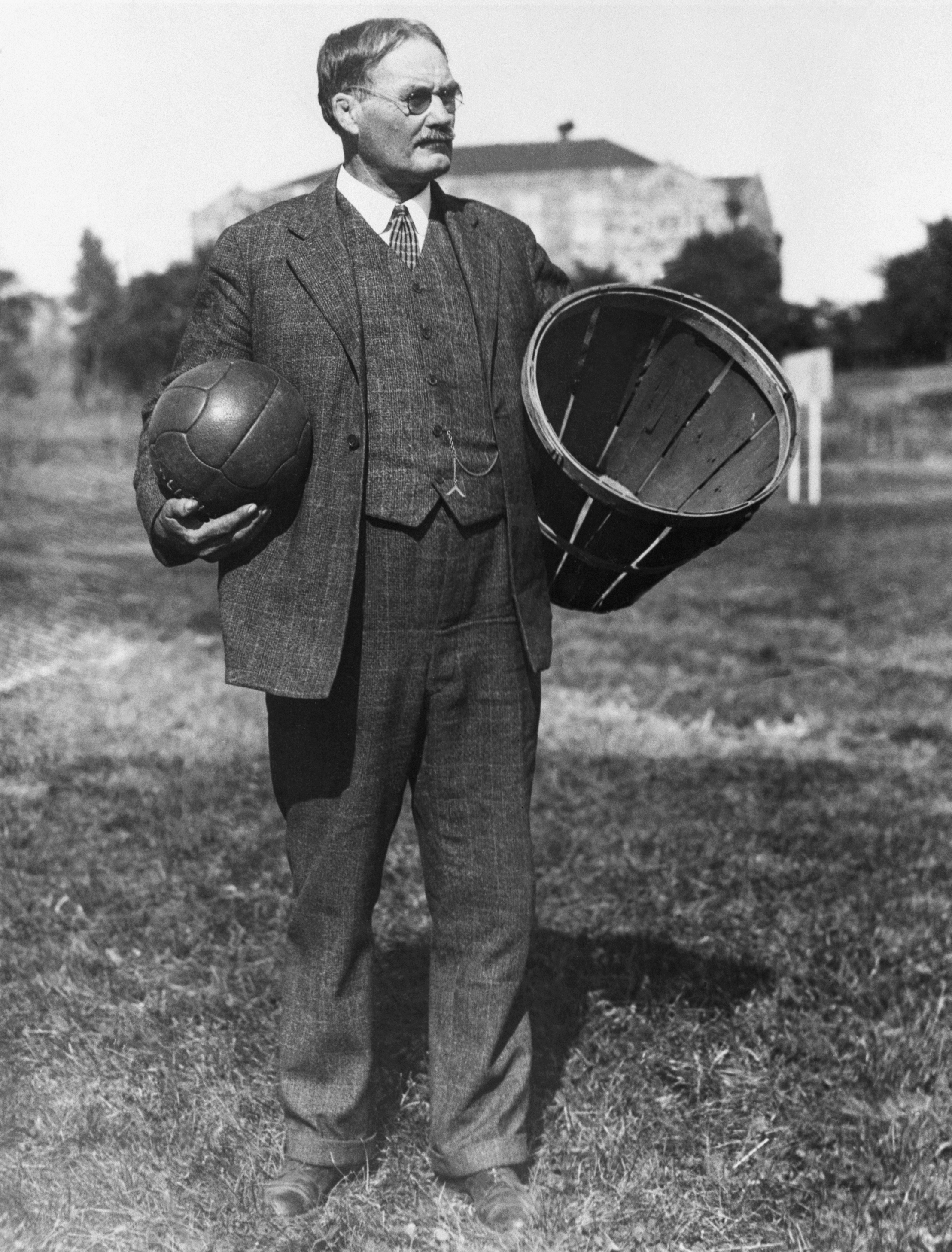
James Naismith, the inventor of basketball.

In the 2013 American Community Survey 5,310,285 identified as Scottish and 2,976,878 as of Scots-Irish descent. Americans of Scottish descent outnumber the population of Scotland, where 4,459,071 or 88.09% of people identified as ethnic Scottish in the 2001 Census.

The number of Americans with a Scottish ancestor is estimated to be between 9 and 25 million (up to 8.3% of the total US population), and "Scotch-Irish", 27 to 30 million (up to 10% of the total US population), but these subgroups overlap and are often not distinguishable. The majority of Scotch-Irish originally came from Lowland Scotland and Northern England before migrating to the province of Ulster in Ireland (see Plantation of Ulster) and thence, beginning about five generations later, to North America in large numbers during the 18th century.

Several Presidents of the United States have claimed Scottish ancestry or Scotch-Irish ancestry, including James Monroe through his great-great-grandfather Patrick Andrew Monroe emigrated to America, Andrew Jackson, Theodore Roosevelt, Franklin D. Roosevelt, Harry S. Truman, Lyndon B. Johnson, Richard Nixon, Ronald Reagan, Bill Clinton, George W. Bush and Donald Trump, whose mother, Mary Anne MacLeod Trump, was born in Tong on the Isle of Lewis.

=== Canada ===
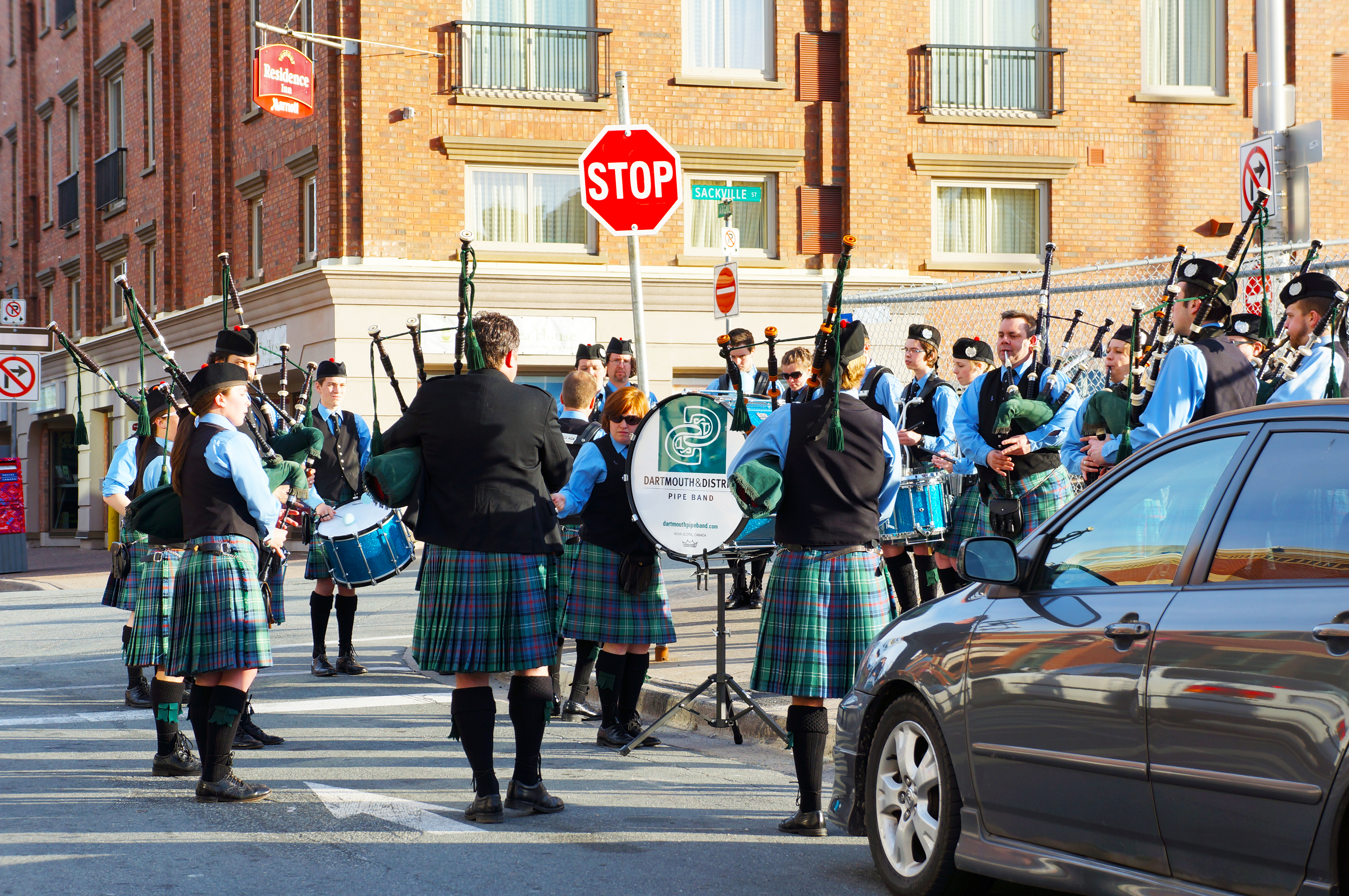
The province of Nova Scotia, where over 30% of the population are of Scottish origin.

As the third-largest ethnic group in Canada and amongst the first Europeans to settle in the country, Scottish people have made a large impact on Canadian culture since colonial times. According to the 2011 Census of Canada, the number of Canadians claiming full or partial Scottish descent is 4,714,970, or 15.10% of the nation's total population.

Many respondents may have misunderstood the question and the numerous responses for "Canadian" do not give an accurate figure for numerous groups, particularly those of British Isles origins. Scottish-Canadians are the 3rd biggest ethnic group in Canada. Scottish culture has particularly thrived in the Canadian province of Nova Scotia (Latin for "New Scotland"). There, in Cape Breton, where both lowland and highland Scots settled in large numbers, Canadian Gaelic is still spoken by a small number of residents. Cape Breton is the home of the Gaelic College of Celtic Arts and Crafts. Glengarry County in present-day Eastern Ontario is a historic county that was set up as a settlement for Highland Scots, where many from the Highlands settled to preserve their culture as a result of the Highland Clearances. Gaelic was the native language of the community since its settlement in the 18th century although the number of speakers decreased as a result of English migration. As of the modern 21st century, there are still a few Gaelic speakers in the community.

John Kenneth Galbraith in his book The Scotch (Toronto: MacMillan, 1964) documents the descendants of 19th-century Scottish pioneers who settled in Southwestern Ontario and affectionately referred to themselves as 'Scotch'. He states the book was meant to give a true picture of life in the community in the early decades of the 20th century.

=== Australia ===
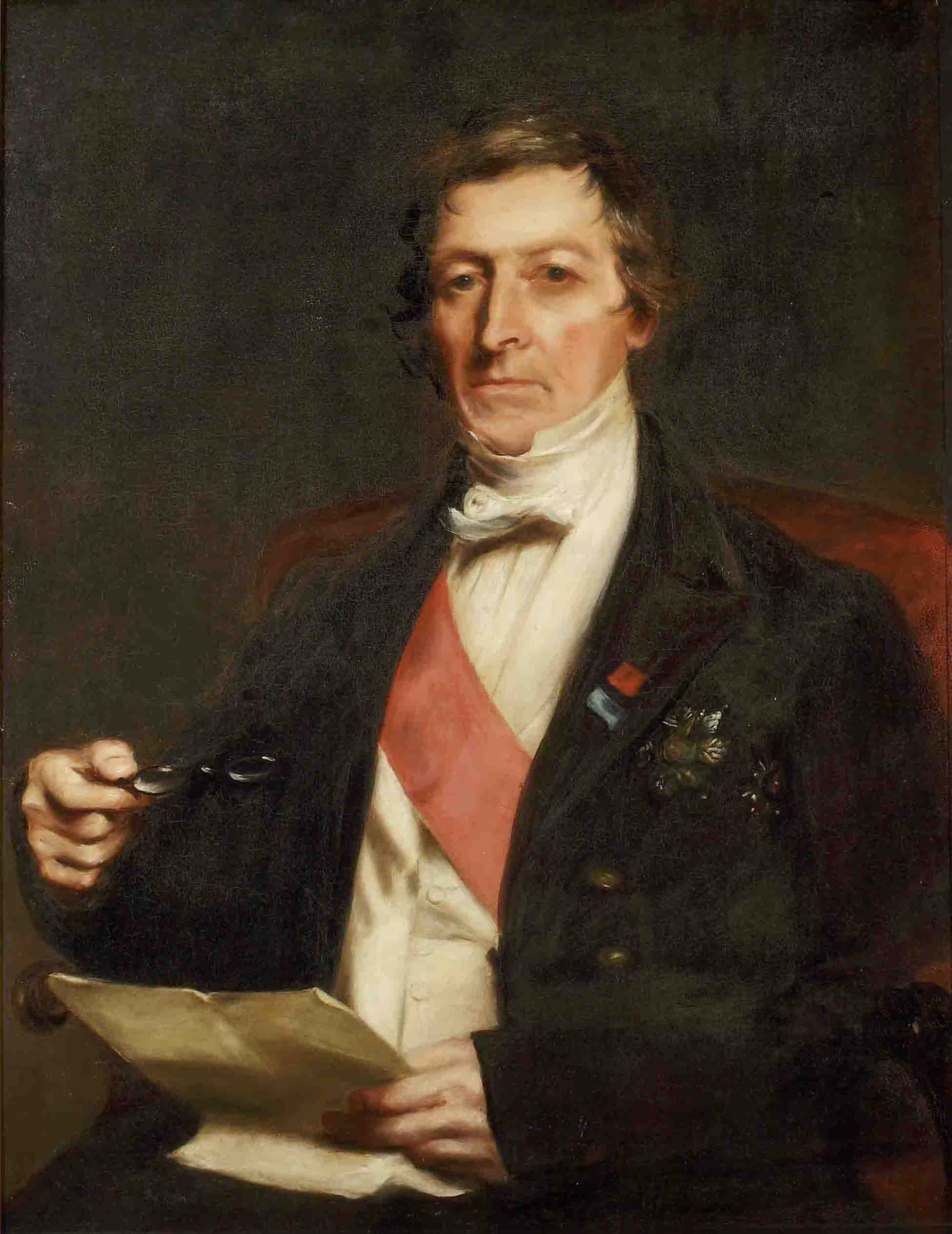
The Australian city of Brisbane is named after Scotsman Thomas Brisbane.

By 1830, 15.11% of the colonies' total non-Aboriginal population were Scots, which increased by the middle of the century to 25,000, or 20–25% of the non-Aboriginal population. The Australian Gold Rush of the 1850s provided a further impetus for Scottish migration: in the 1850s 90,000 Scots immigrated to Australia, far more than other British or Irish populations at the time. Literacy rates of the Scottish immigrants ran at 90–95%. By 1860, Scots made up 50% of the ethnic composition of Western Victoria, Adelaide, Penola and Naracoorte. Other settlements in New South Wales included New England, the Hunter Valley and the Illawarra.

Much settlement followed the Highland Potato Famine, Highland Clearances and the Lowland Clearances of the mid-19th century. In the 1840s, Scots-born immigrants constituted 12% of the non-Aboriginal population. Out of the 1.3 million migrants from Britain to Australia in the period from 1861 to 1914, 13.5% were Scots. Just 5.3% of the convicts transported to Eastern Australia between 1789 and 1852 were Scots.

A steady rate of Scottish immigration continued into the 20th century and substantial numbers of Scots continued to arrive after 1945. From 1900 until the 1950s, Scots favoured New South Wales, as well as Western Australia and Southern Australia. A strong cultural Scottish presence is evident in the Highland Games, dance, Tartan Day celebrations, clan and Gaelic-speaking societies found throughout modern Australia.

According to the 2021 Australian census, 130,060 Australian residents were born in Scotland, while 2,176,777 claimed Scottish ancestry, either alone or in combination with another ancestry. This is the fourth most commonly nominated ancestry and represents over 8.4% of the total population of Australia.

=== New Zealand ===
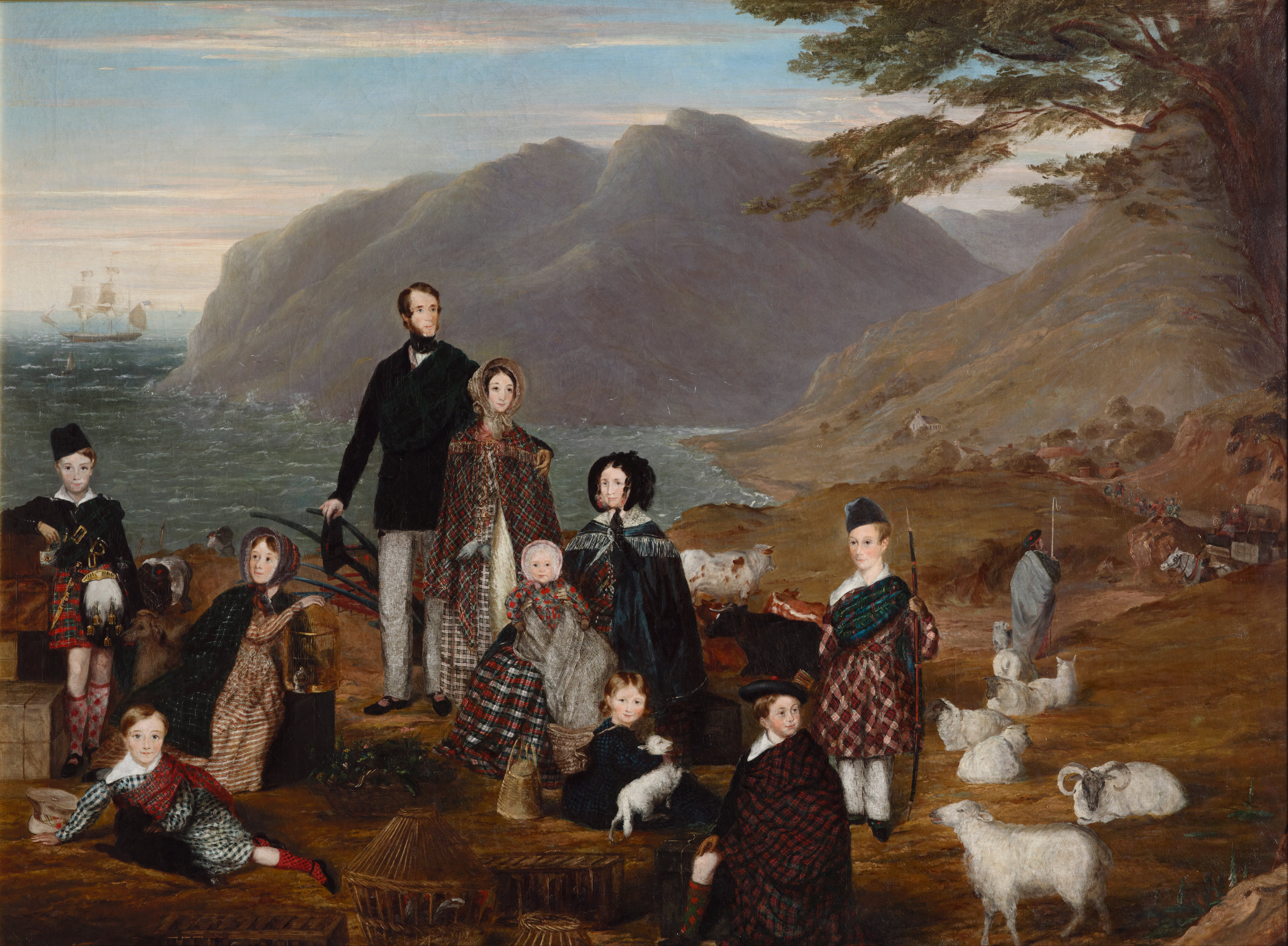
Scottish Highland family migrating to New Zealand in 1844

Significant numbers of Scottish people also settled in New Zealand. Approximately 20 per cent of the original European settler population of New Zealand came from Scotland, and Scottish influence is still visible around the country. The South Island city of Dunedin, in particular, is known for its Scottish heritage and was named as a tribute to Edinburgh by the city's Scottish founders.

Scottish migration to New Zealand dates back to the earliest period of European colonisation, with a large proportion of Pākehā New Zealanders being of Scottish descent. However, identification as "British" or "European" New Zealanders can sometimes obscure their origin. Many Scottish New Zealanders also have Māori or other non-European ancestry.

The majority of Scottish immigrants settled on the South Island. All over New Zealand, the Scots developed different means to bridge the old homeland and the new. Many Caledonian societies were formed, well over 100 by the early twentieth century, that helped maintain Scottish culture and traditions. From the 1860s, these societies organised annual Caledonian Games throughout New Zealand. The Games were sports meets that brought together Scottish settlers and the wider New Zealand public. In so doing, the Games gave Scots a path to cultural integration as Scottish New Zealanders. In the 1961 census there were 47,078 people living in New Zealand who were born in Scotland; in the 2013 census there were 25,953 in this category.

=== United Kingdom ===
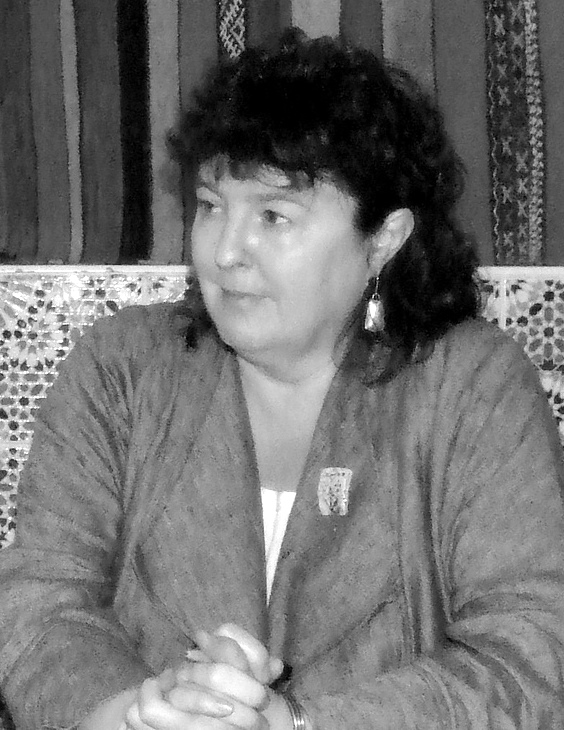
Carol Ann Duffy, the first woman and the first Scottish person to be appointed the Poet Laureate of the United Kingdom

Many people of Scottish descent live in other parts of the United Kingdom. In Ulster particularly the colonial policies of James VI, known as the plantation of Ulster, resulted in a Presbyterian and Scottish society, which formed the Ulster-Scots community. The Protestant Ascendancy did not however benefit them much, as the ascendancy was predominantly Anglican. The number of people of Scottish descent in England and Wales is difficult to quantify due to the many complex migrations on the island, and ancient migration patterns due to wars, famine and conquest. The 2011 Census recorded 708,872 people born in Scotland resident in England, 24,346 resident in Wales and 15,455 resident in Northern Ireland.

Northamptonshire town Corby became a centre for Scottish migration in the 1930s. In 1961 a third of residents were born in Scotland, and in 2011 the figure was 12.7%.

=== Rest of Europe ===
Other European countries have had their share of Scots immigrants. The Scots have emigrated to mainland Europe for centuries as merchants and soldiers. Many emigrated to France, Poland, Italy, Germany, Scandinavia, and the Netherlands. Recently some scholars suggested that up to 250,000 Russian nationals may have Scottish ancestry.

=== Africa ===
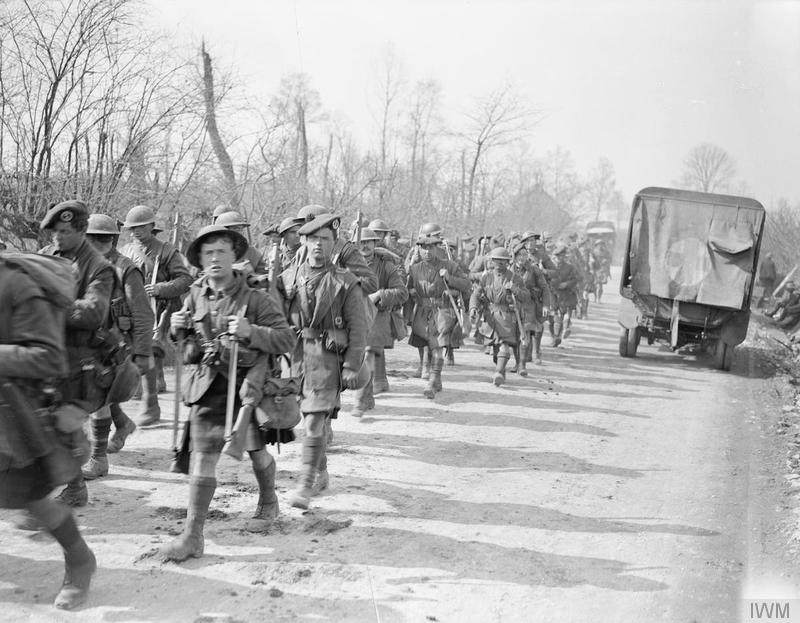
Troops of the South African Scottish regiment in France, 1918

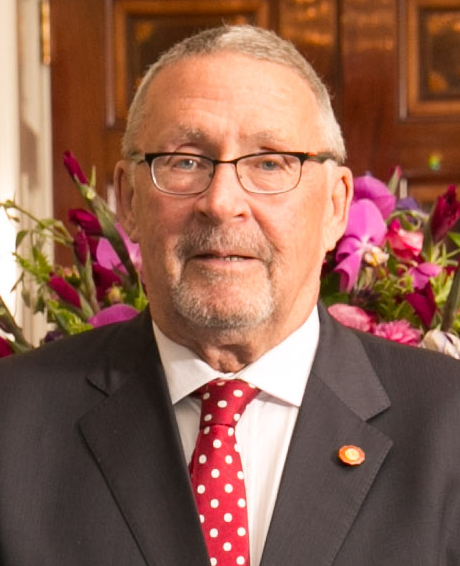
Guy Scott, the 12th vice-president and acting president of Zambia from Oct 2014 – Jan 2015, is of Scottish descent.

A number of Scottish people settled in South Africa in the 1800s and were known for their road-building expertise, their farming experience, and architectural skills.

=== Latin America ===
The largest population of Scots in Latin America is found in Argentina, followed by Chile,, Colombia and Mexico.

== Scots in mainland Europe ==
=== Netherlands ===
The first people from the Low Countries to settle in Scotland came in the wake of Maud's marriage to the Scottish king, David I, in 1114. Craftsmen and tradesmen followed courtiers and in later centuries a brisk trade grew up between the two nations: Scotland's primary goods (wool, hides, salmon and then coal) in exchange for the luxuries obtainable in the Netherlands, one of the major hubs of European trade.

By 1600, trading colonies had grown up on either side of the well-travelled shipping routes: the Dutch settled along the eastern seaboard of Scotland; the Scots congregating first in Campvere—where they were allowed to land their goods duty-free and run their own affairs—and then in Rotterdam, where Scottish and Dutch Calvinism coexisted comfortably. Besides the thousands (or, according to one estimate, over 1 million) of local descendants with Scots ancestry, both ports still show signs of these early alliances. Now a museum, 'The Scots House' in the town of Veere was the only place outwith Scotland where Scots Law was practised. In Rotterdam, meanwhile, the doors of the Scots International Church have remained open since 1643.

=== Russia ===
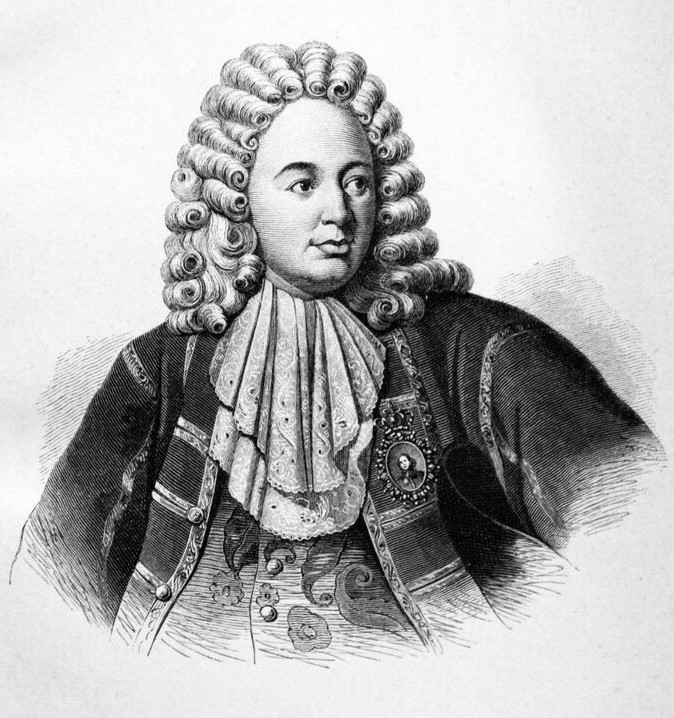
Patrick Gordon was a Russian General originally from Scotland and a friend of Peter the Great.

The first Scots to be mentioned in Russia's history were the Scottish soldiers in Muscovy referred to as early as the 14th century. Among the 'soldiers of fortune' was the ancestor of the famous Russian poet Mikhail Lermontov, called George Learmonth. A number of Scots gained wealth and fame in the times of Peter the Great and Catherine the Great. These include Admiral Thomas Gordon, Commander-in-Chief of Kronstadt, Patrick Gordon, Paul Menzies, Samuel Greig, Charles Baird, Charles Cameron, Adam Menelaws and William Hastie. Several doctors to the Russian court were from Scotland, the best-known being James Wylie.

The next wave of migration established commercial links with Russia.

The 19th century witnessed the immense literary cross-references between Scotland and Russia.

A Russian scholar, Maria Koroleva, distinguishes between 'the Russian Scots' (properly assimilated) and 'Scots in Russia', who remained thoroughly Scottish.

There are several societies in contemporary Russia to unite the Scots. The Russian census lists do not distinguish Scots from other British people, so it is hard to establish reliable figures for the number of Scots living and working in modern Russia.

=== Poland ===
From as far back as the mid-16th century there were Scots trading and settling in Poland. A "Scotch Pedlar's Pack in Poland" became a proverbial expression. It usually consisted of cloths, woollen goods and linen kerchiefs (head coverings). Itinerants also sold tin utensils and ironware such as scissors and knives. Along with the protection offered by King Stephen in the Royal Grant of 1576, a district in Kraków was assigned to Scottish immigrants.

Records from 1592 mention Scots settlers who were granted citizenship of Kraków give their employment as traders or merchants. Fees for citizenship ranged from 12 Polish florins to a musket and gunpowder, or an undertaking to marry within a year and a day of acquiring a holding.

By the 17th century, an estimated 30,000 to 40,000 Scots lived in the Polish–Lithuanian Commonwealth. Many came from Dundee and Aberdeen. Scots could be found in Polish towns on the banks of the Vistula as far south as Kraków. Settlers from Aberdeenshire were mainly Episcopalians or Catholics, but there were also large numbers of Calvinists. As well as Scottish traders, there were also many Scottish soldiers in Poland. In 1656, a number of Scottish highlanders seeking opportunities abroad, emigrated to the Polish–Lithuanian Commonwealth to enlist in the Swedish Army under Charles X Gustav in his war against it. James Murray created the Polish navy and participated in the Battle of Oliwa. A series of four Polish novels include him as Captain Mora or Flying Scotsman. The writer Jerzy Bohdan Rychliński was supported by navy historian Jerzy Pertek.

The Scots integrated well and many acquired great wealth. They contributed to many charitable institutions in the host country, but did not forget their homeland; for example, in 1701 when collections were made for the restoration fund of the Marischal College, Aberdeen, Scottish settlers in Poland gave generously.

Many royal grants and privileges were granted to Scottish merchants until the 18th century, at which time the settlers began to merge more and more into the native population. "Bonnie Prince Charlie" was half Polish, since he was the son of James Stuart, the "Old Pretender", and Clementina Sobieska, granddaughter of Jan Sobieski, King of Poland. In 1691, the City of Warsaw elected the Scottish immigrant Aleksander Czamer (Alexander Chalmers) as its mayor.

Novelist Henryk Sienkiewicz created a fictional character, Hassling-Ketling of Elgin, played by Jan Nowicki in the film Colonel Wolodyjowski.

=== Italy ===
By 1592, the Scottish community in Rome was big enough to merit the building of Sant'Andrea degli Scozzesi (St Andrew of the Scots). It was constructed for the Scottish expatriate community in Rome, especially for those intended for priesthood. The adjoining hospice was a shelter for Catholic Scots who fled their country because of religious persecution. In 1615, Pope Paul V gave the hospice and the nearby Scottish Seminar to the Jesuits. It was rebuilt in 1645. The church and facilities became more important when James Francis Edward Stuart, the Old Pretender, set up residence in Rome in 1717, but were abandoned during the French occupation of Rome in the late 18th century. In 1820, although religious activity was resumed, it was no longer led by the Jesuits. Sant'Andrea degli Scozzesi was reconstructed in 1869 by Luigi Poletti. The church was deconsecrated in 1962 and incorporated into a bank (Cassa di Risparmio delle Province Lombarde). The Scottish Seminar also moved away. The Feast of St Andrew is still celebrated there on 30 November.

Gurro in Italy is said to be populated by the descendants of Scottish soldiers. According to local legend, Scottish soldiers fleeing the Battle of Pavia who arrived in the area were stopped by severe blizzards that forced many, if not all, to give up their travels and settle in the town. To this day, the town of Gurro is still proud of its Scottish links. Many of the residents claim that their surnames are Italian translations of Scottish surnames. The town also has a Scottish museum.

== Culture ==
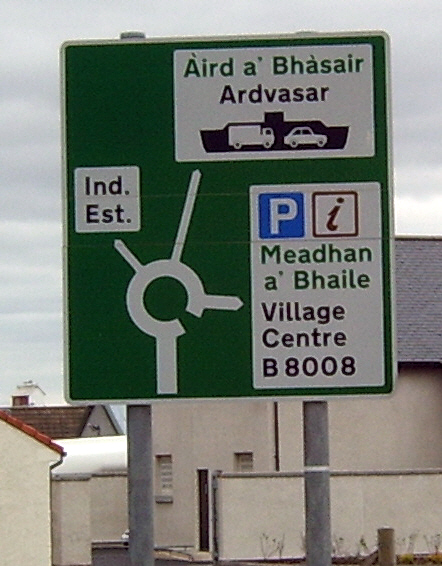
Scottish Gaelic and English are both used on road signs – such as this one in the village of Mallaig – throughout the Highlands and Islands of Scotland

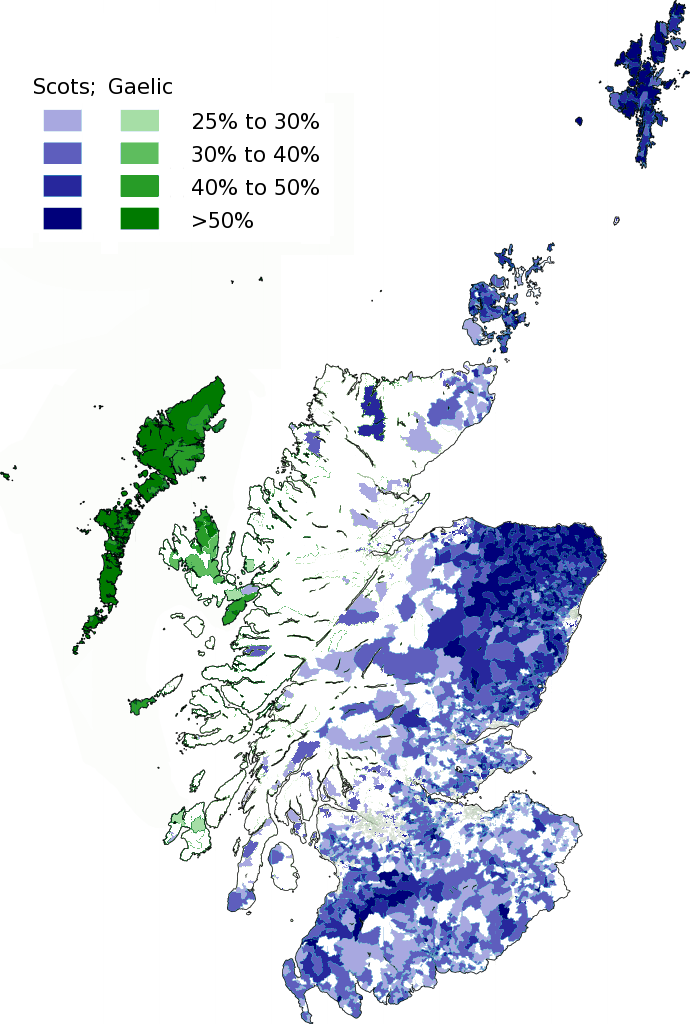
Geographic distribution of speakers of the two native Scottish languages, namely Scots and Scottish Gaelic

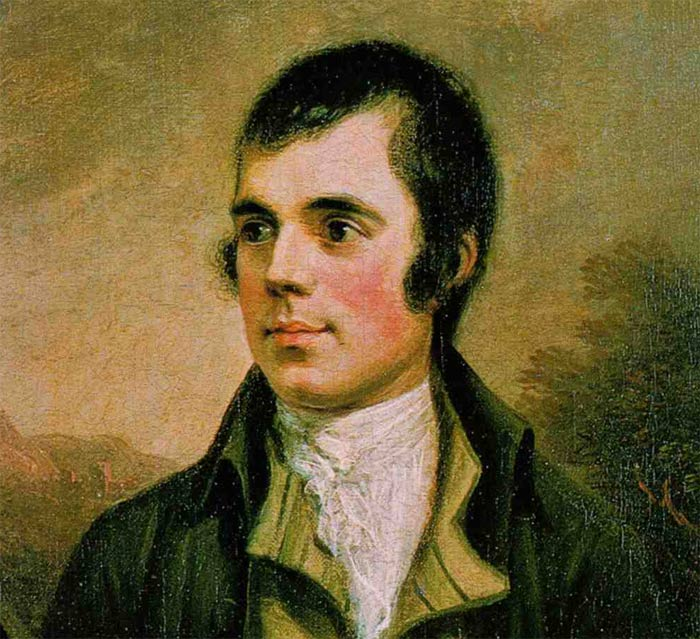
Robert Burns, considered by many to be the Scottish national poet

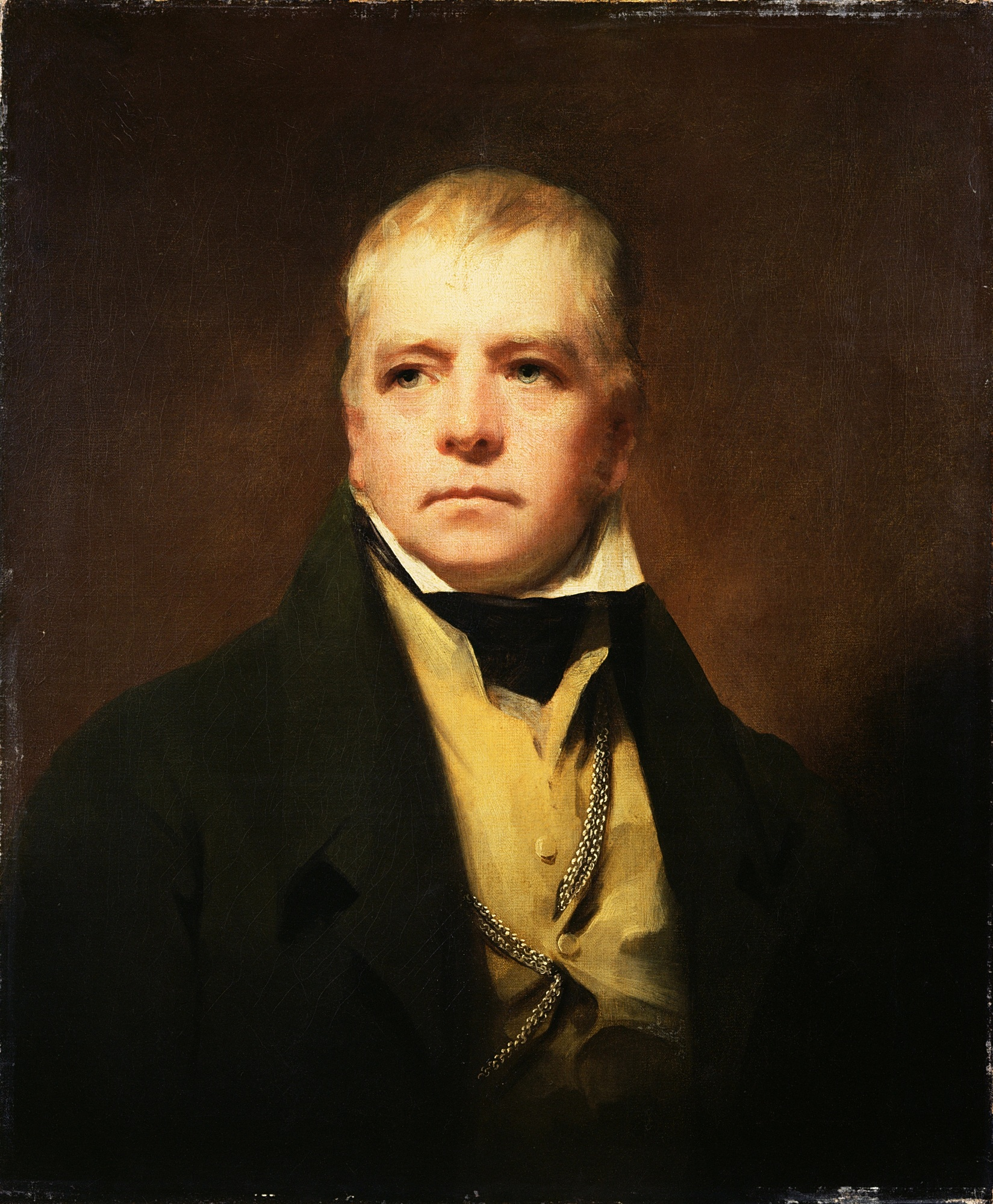
Walter Scott, whose Waverley Novels helped define Scottish identity in the 19th century

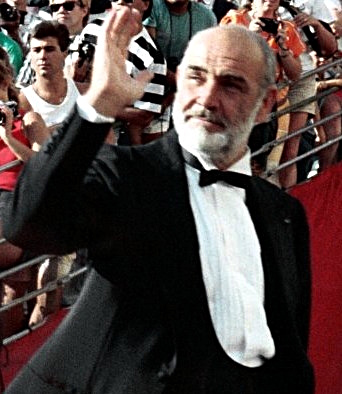
Scottish actor Sean Connery polled as "The Greatest Living Scot" and "Scotland's Greatest Living National Treasure", before his death in late 2020.

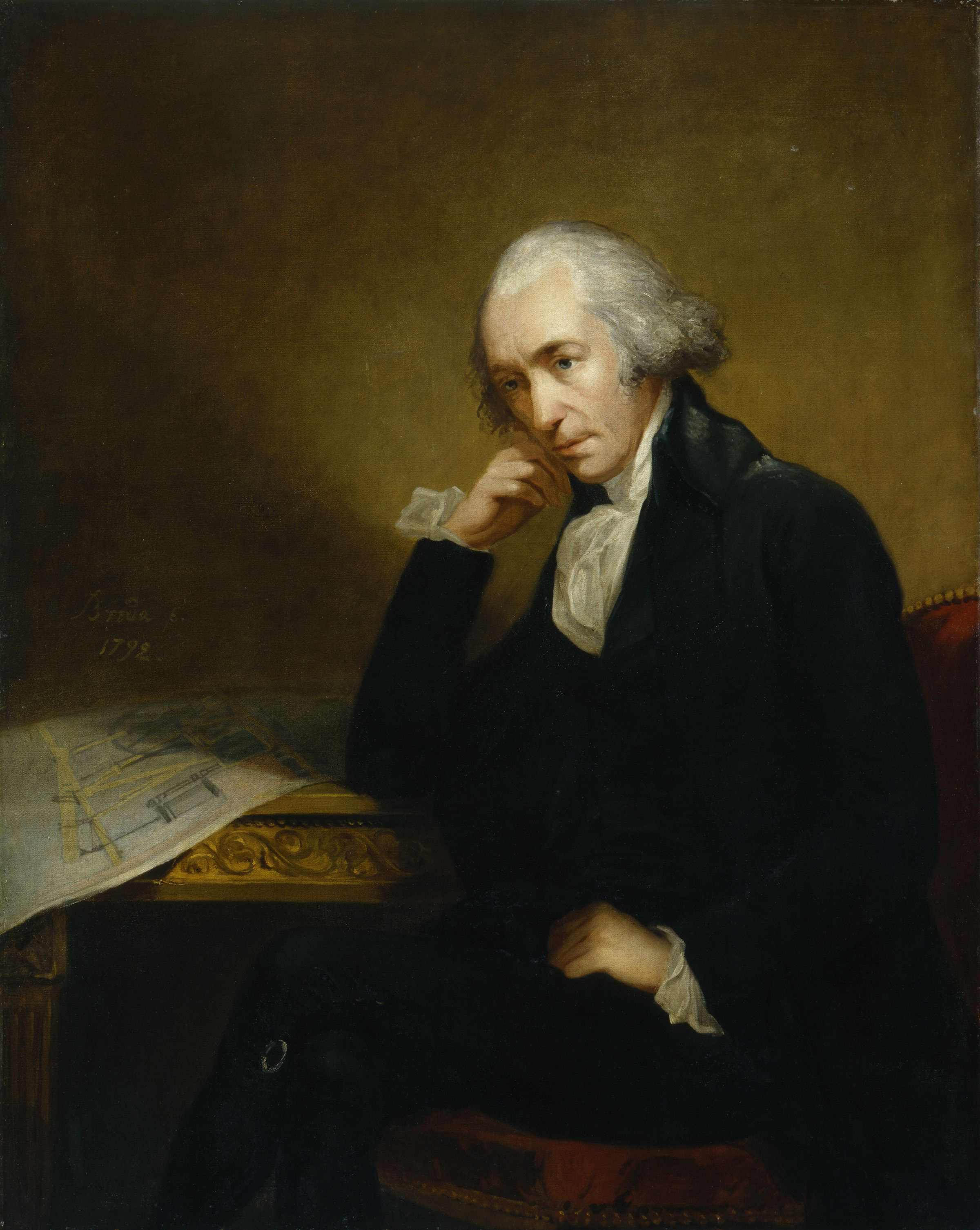
James Watt, a Scottish mechanical engineer whose improvements in steam engine technology drove the Industrial Revolution.

=== Language ===
Historically, Scottish people have spoken many different languages and dialects. The Pictish language, Norse, Norman-French and Brythonic languages have been spoken by forebears of Scottish people. However, none of these is in use today. The remaining three major languages of the Scottish people are English, Scots (various dialects) and Gaelic. Of these three, English is the most common form as a first language. There are some other minority languages of the Scottish people, such as Spanish, used by the population of Scots in Argentina.

The Norn language was spoken in the Northern Isles into the early modern period – the current Shetland and Orcadian dialects are heavily influenced by it to this day.

There is still debate whether Scots is a dialect or a language in its own right, as there is no clear line to define the two. Scots is usually regarded as a midway between the two, as it is highly mutually intelligible with English, particularly the dialects spoken in the North of England as well as those spoken in Scotland, but is treated as a language in some laws.

==== Scottish English ====
After the Union of Crowns in 1603, the Scottish Court moved with James VI & I to London and English vocabulary began to be used by the Scottish upper classes. With the introduction of the printing press, spellings became standardised. Scottish English, a Scottish variation of southern English English, began to replace the Scots language. Scottish English soon became the dominant language. By the end of the 17th century, Scots had practically ceased to exist, at least in literary form. While Scots remained a commonly spoken language, the southern Scottish English dialect was the preferred language for publications from the 18th century to the present day. Today most Scottish people speak Scottish English, which has some distinctive vocabulary and may be influenced to varying degrees by Scots.

==== Scots ====
Lowland Scots, also known as Lallans or Doric, is a language of Germanic origin. It has its roots in Northern Middle English. After the wars of independence, the English used by Lowland Scots speakers evolved in a different direction from that of Modern English. Since 1424, this language, known to its speakers as Inglis, was used by the Parliament of Scotland in its statutes. By the middle of the 15th century, the language's name had changed from Inglis to Scottis. The reformation, from 1560 onwards, saw the beginning of a decline in the use of Scots forms. With the establishment of the Protestant Presbyterian religion, and lacking a Scots translation of the Bible, they used the Geneva Edition. From that point on, God spoke English, not Scots. Scots continued to be used in official legal and court documents throughout the 18th century. However, due to the adoption of the southern standard by officialdom and the Education system the use of written Scots declined. Lowland Scots is still a popular spoken language with over 1.5 million Scots speakers in Scotland. Scots is used by about 30,000 Ulster Scots and is known in official circles as Ullans. In 1993, Ulster Scots was recognised, along with Scots, as a variety of the Scots language by the European Bureau for Lesser-Used Languages.

==== Scottish Gaelic ====
Scottish Gaelic is a Celtic language with similarities to Irish. Scottish Gaelic comes from Old Irish. It was originally spoken by the Gaels of Dál Riata and the Rhinns of Galloway, later being adopted by the Pictish people of central and eastern Scotland. Gaelic (lingua Scottica, Scottis) became the de facto language of the whole Kingdom of Alba. Meanwhile, Gaelic independently spread from Galloway into Dumfriesshire. It is unclear if the Gaelic of 12th-century Clydesdale and Selkirkshire came from Galloway or other parts of Scotland. The predominance of Gaelic began to decline in the 13th century, and by the end of the Middle Ages, Scotland was divided into two linguistic zones, the English/Scots-speaking Lowlands and the Gaelic-speaking Highlands and Galloway. Gaelic continued to be spoken widely throughout the Highlands until the 19th century. The Highland clearances actively discouraged the use of Gaelic, and caused the number of Gaelic speakers to fall. Many Gaelic speakers emigrated to countries such as Canada or moved to the industrial cities of lowland Scotland. Communities, where the language is still spoken natively, are restricted to the west coast of Scotland; especially the Hebrides. However, some Gaelic speakers also live in the cities of Glasgow and Edinburgh. A report in 2005 by the Registrar General for Scotland based on the 2001 UK Census showed about 92,400 people or 1.9% of the population can speak Gaelic, while the number of people able to read and write it rose by 7.5% and 10% respectively. Outwith Scotland, there are communities of Scottish Gaelic speakers such as the Canadian Gaelic community; though their numbers have also been declining rapidly. The Gaelic language is recognised as a minority language by the European Union. The Scottish Parliament is also seeking to increase the use of Gaelic in Scotland through the Gaelic Language (Scotland) Act 2005. Gaelic is now used as a first language in some schools and is prominently seen in use on dual language road signs throughout the Gaelic-speaking parts of Scotland.

=== Religion ===
The modern people of Scotland remain a mix of different religions and no religion. Christianity is the largest faith in Scotland. Christianity has shaped the religious life of the Scottish people for over 1,400 years. In the 2011 census, 53.8% of the Scottish population identified as Christian. The Protestant and Catholic divisions still remain in the society. About 14.4 per cent of the population identifies as Catholic, according to the Scottish Household Survey for 2014. In Scotland the main Protestant body is the Church of Scotland which is Presbyterian. In the United States, people of Scottish and Scots-Irish descent are chiefly Protestant, especially in the US South, with many belonging to the Baptist or Methodist churches or various Presbyterian denominations.

According to the Social Scottish Attitudes research, 52% of Scottish people identified as having no religion in 2016.

=== Clans ===
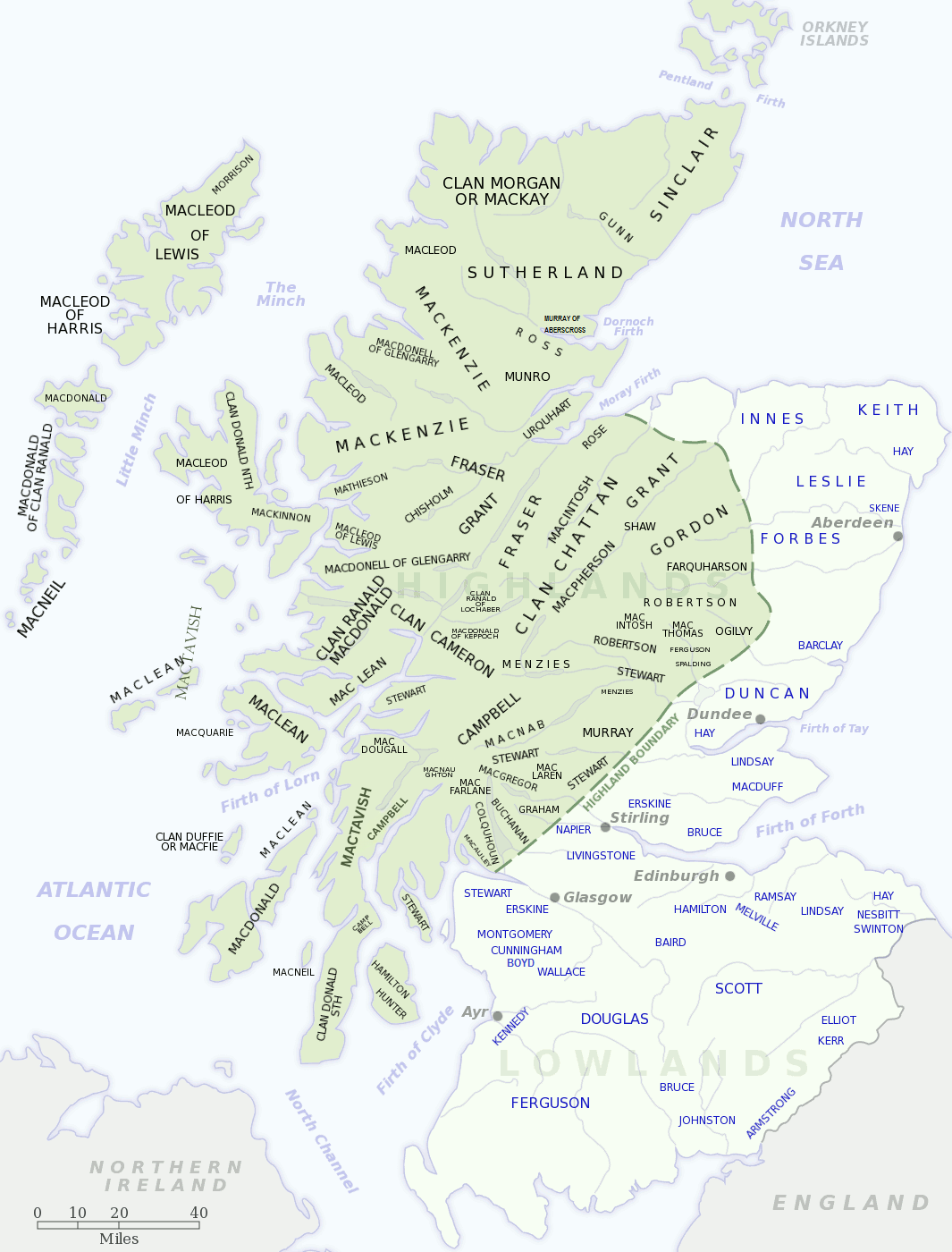
Map of Scottish Highland clans and lowland families

=== Sport ===
The modern games of curling and golf originated in Scotland. Both sports are governed by bodies headquartered in Scotland, the World Curling Federation and the Royal and Ancient Golf Club of St Andrews respectively. Scots helped to popularise and spread the sport of association football; the first official international match was played in Glasgow between Scotland and England in 1872.

== Anglicisation ==
Many Scottish surnames have become anglicised over the centuries. This reflected the gradual spread of English, initially in the form of Early Scots, from around the 13th century onwards, through Scotland beyond its traditional area in the Lothians. It also reflected some deliberate political attempts to promote the English language in the outlying regions of Scotland, including following the Union of the Crowns under King James VI of Scotland and I of England in 1603, and then the Acts of Union of 1707 and the subsequent defeat of rebellions.

However, many Scottish surnames have remained predominantly Gaelic albeit written according to English orthographic practice (as with Irish surnames). Thus MacAoidh in Gaelic is Mackay in English, and MacGill-Eain in Gaelic is MacLean and so on. Mac (sometimes Mc) is common as, effectively, it means "son of". MacDonald, MacDougal, MacAulay, Gilmore, Gilmour, MacKinley, Macintosh, MacKenzie, MacNeill, MacPherson, MacLear, MacAra, Bruce, Campbell, Fraser, Oliver, Craig, Lauder, Menzies, Stewart, Galloway and Duncan are just a few of many examples of traditional Scottish surnames. There are, of course, also the many surnames, like Wallace and Morton, stemming from parts of Scotland which were settled by peoples other than the (Gaelic) Scots. The most common surnames in Scotland are Smith and Brown, which each come from more than one origin: e.g. Smith might be a translation of Mac a' Ghobhainn (thence also e.g. MacGowan), and Brown can refer to the colour, or be akin to MacBrayne.

Anglicisation is not restricted to language. In his Socialism: critical and constructive, published in 1921, future British Prime Minister Ramsay MacDonald wrote: "The Anglification of Scotland has been proceeding apace to the damage of its education, its music, its literature, its genius, and the generation that is growing up under this influence is uprooted from its past, and, being deprived of the inspiration of its nationality, is also deprived of its communal sense."

== See also ==
- Eminent 19th century Scotsmen
- List of Scots
- Scottish names
- Scottish national identity
- Scottish Romani and Traveller groups

== Sources ==
- Ritchie, Anna, and David J. Breeze, Invaders of Scotland HMSO, 1991.
- Armitage, David, "The Scottish Diaspora" in Jenny Wormald (ed.), Scotland: A History, Oxford: Oxford University Press, 2005.
