= Cardinals created by Clement X =

Catholic appointments from 1670 to 1675

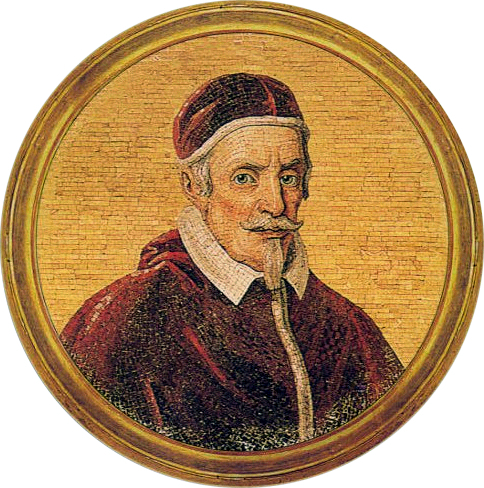
Pope Clement X (1590–1676).

Pope Clement X (r. 1670–1676) created 20 cardinals in six consistories.

== December 22, 1670 ==
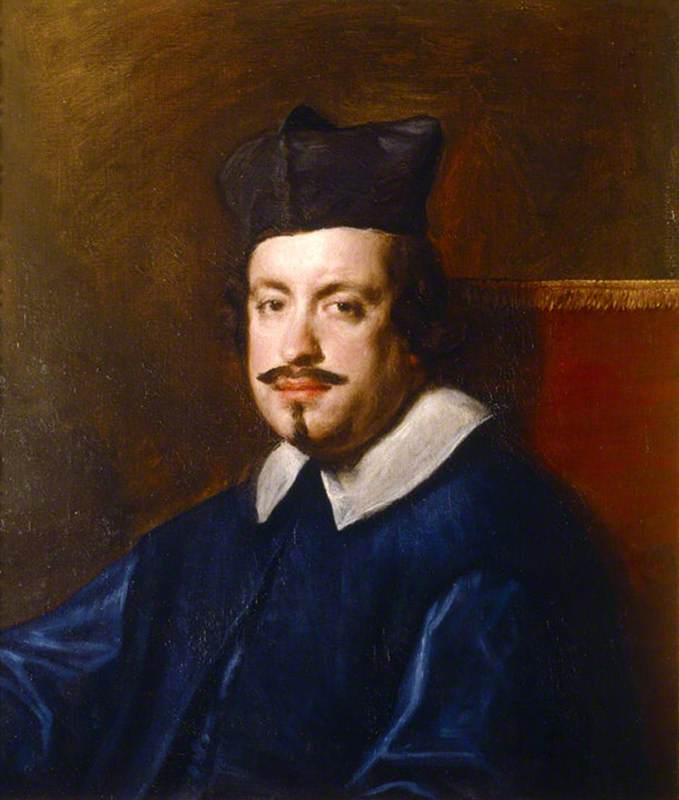
Camillo Massimo (1620–77), made a cardinal on December 22, 1670.

1. Federico Borromeo, iuniore
2. Camillo Massimo
3. Gasparo Carpegna

== August 24, 1671 ==
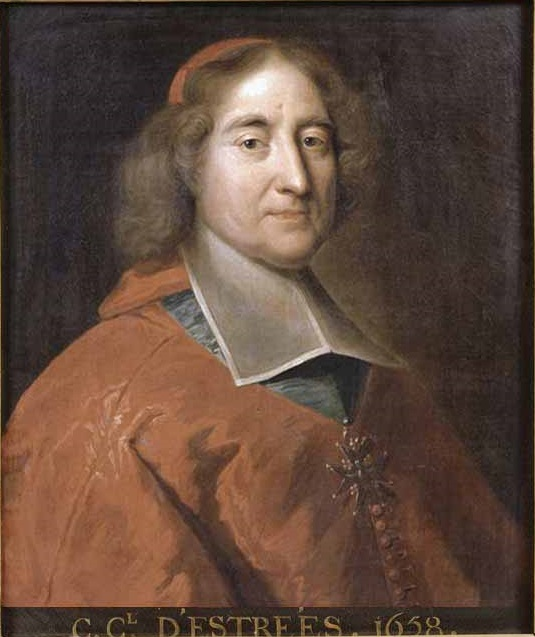
César d'Estrées (1628–1714), made a cardinal on August 24, 1671.

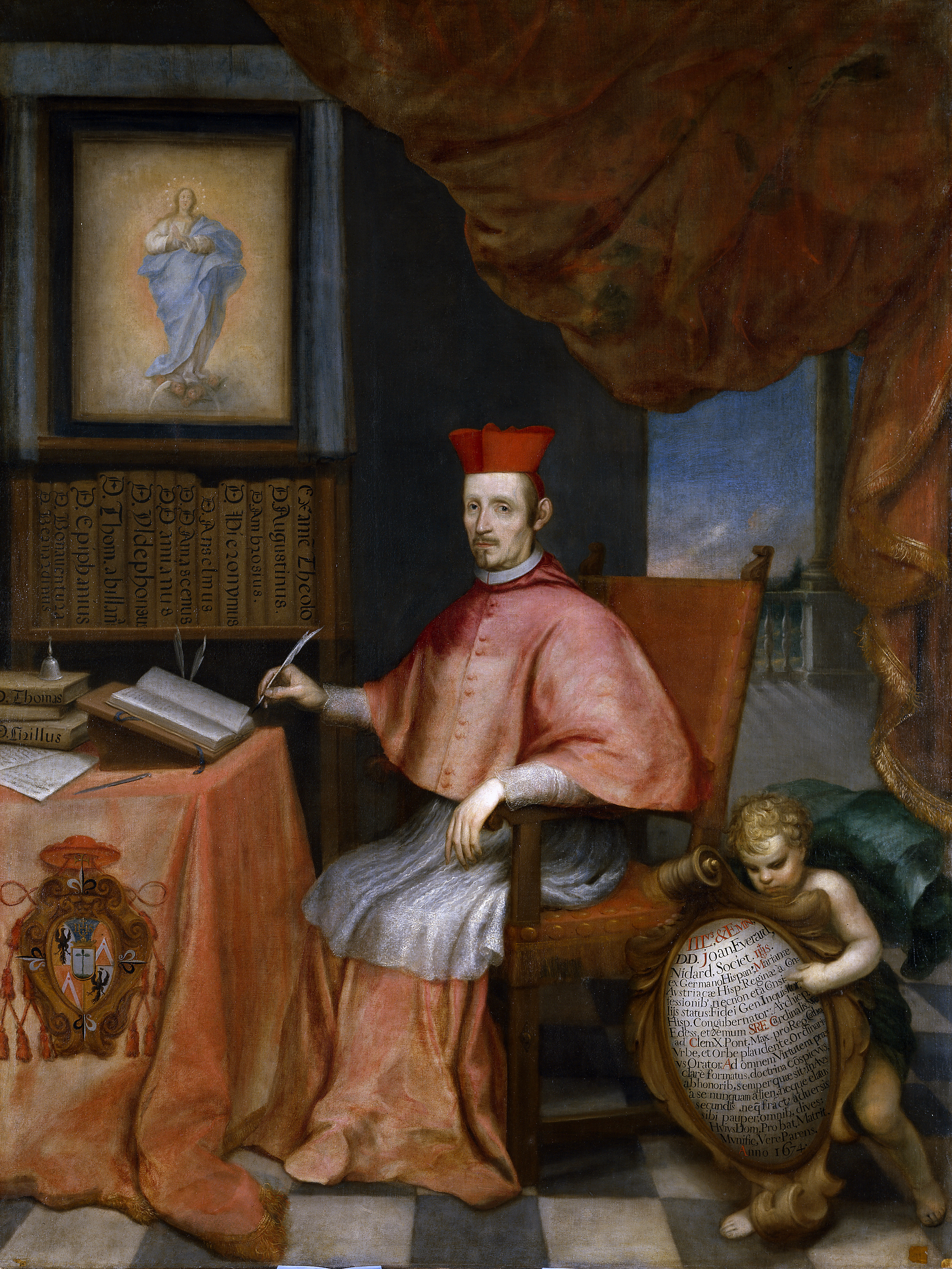
Juan Everardo Nithard (1607–81), made a cardinal on August 24, 1671.

1. Bernhard Gustave von Baden-Durlach - Cardinal Priest
2. César d'Estrées - Cardinal Bishop
3. Juan Everardo Nithard, S.J. - Cardinal Priest

== February 22, 1672 ==
1. Piero de Bonzi
2. Vincenzo Maria Orsini

== January 16, 1673 ==
1. Felice Rospigliosi

== June 12, 1673 ==
1. Francesco Nerli (iuniore)
2. Girolamo Gastaldi
3. Girolamo Casanate
4. Federico Baldeschi Colonna
5. Pietro Basadonna

== May 27, 1675 ==
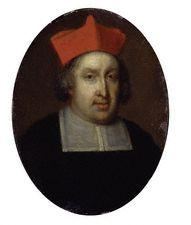
Philip Howard (1629–94), made a cardinal on May 27, 1675.

1. Galeazzo Marescotti
2. Alessandro Crescenzi
3. Bernardino Rocci
4. Fabrizio Spada
5. Mario Alberizzi
6. Philip Howard
