= Pope Clement X =

Head of the Catholic Church from 1670 to 1676

- Bishop of Rome
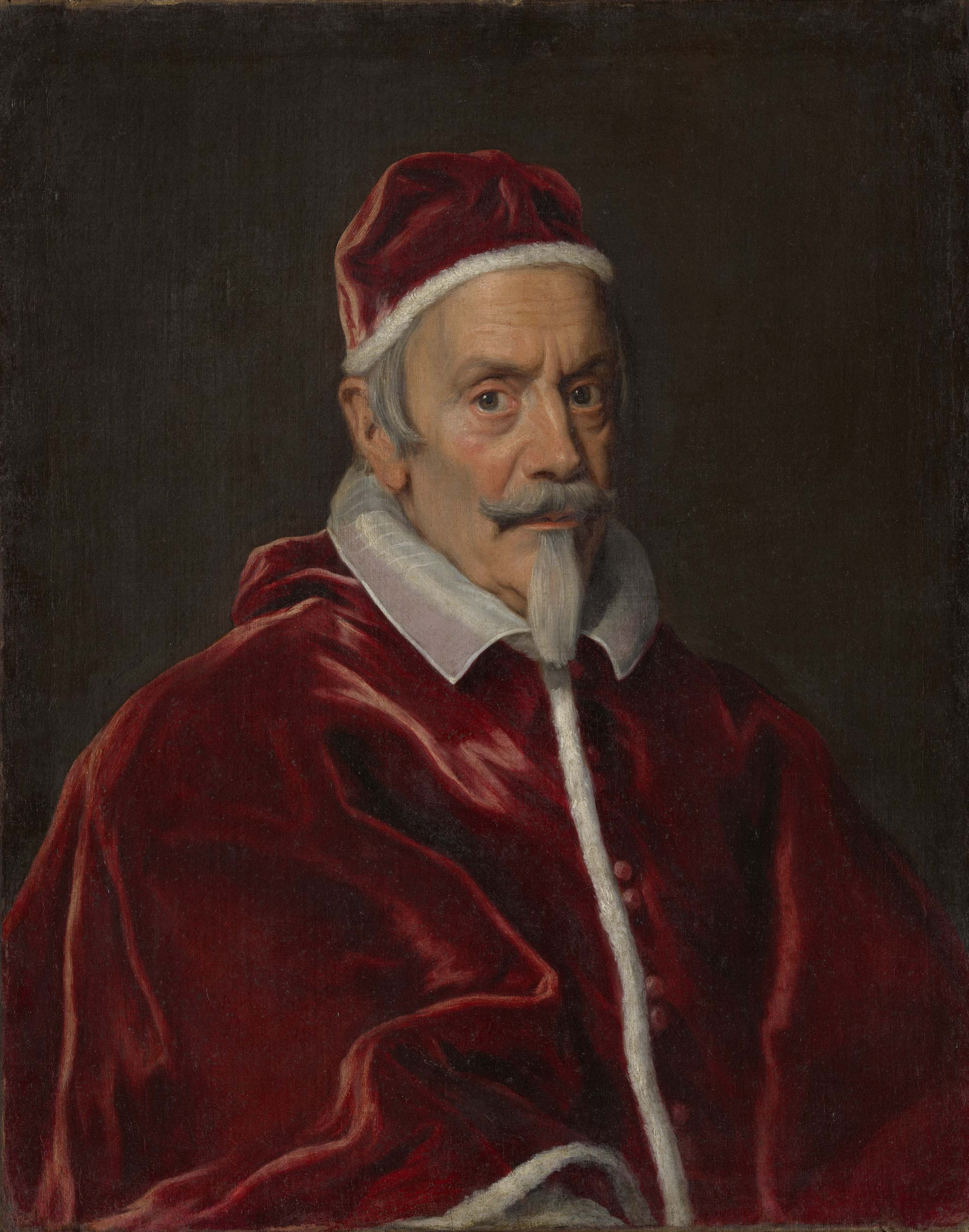
- Portrait by Giovanni Battista Gaulli, c. 1671
- Church: Catholic Church
- Papacy began: 29 April 1670
- Papacy ended: 22 July 1676
- Predecessor: Clement IX
- Successor: Innocent XI
- Previous posts: Bishop of Camerino (1627–1666); Apostolic Nuncio to Naples (1644–1652); Secretary of the S.C. of Bishops and Regulars (1657–1667)

Orders
- Ordination: 6 April 1624 by Marcantonio Barbarigo
- Consecration: 30 November 1627 by Scipione Caffarelli-Borghese
- Created cardinal: 29 November 1669 by Clement IX

Personal details
- Born: Emilio Bonaventura Altieri; 13 July 1590 Rome, Papal States
- Died: 22 July 1676 (aged 86) Rome, Papal States

- Coat of arms

Papal styles of Pope Clement X
- Reference style: His Holiness
- Spoken style: Your Holiness
- Religious style: Holy Father
- Posthumous style: None

Pope Clement X (Latin: Clemens X; Italian: Clemente X; 13 July 1590 – 22 July 1676), born Emilio Bonaventura Altieri, was head of the Catholic Church and ruler of the Papal States from 29 April 1670 to his death on 22 July 1676.

Emilio Bonaventura Altieri, born in Rome in 1590, belonged to the Papal nobility. He received a doctorate in law and held various positions within the Catholic Church, including Bishop of Camerino and Superintendent of the Papal Exchequer. At the age of almost 80, he was elected Pope Clement X in 1670 after a four-month-long conclave. As Pope, he canonized and beatified various saints, promoted good relations between Christian countries, and made efforts to preserve the Altieri family name by adopting the Paoluzzi family. He also established a new tax in Rome, which led to conflicts with ambassadors and cardinals. Clement X celebrated the fourteenth jubilee of the holy year in 1675 despite his old age. During his pontificate, he created 20 cardinals, including Pietro Francesco Orsini, who later became Pope Benedict XIII.

He suspended the Portuguese Inquisition's proceedings in October 1674, challenging the techniques employed against its main victims, the New Christians.

== Early life ==
Emilio Bonaventura Altieri was born in Rome in 1590, the son of Lorenzo Altieri and Vittoria Delfin, a noble Venetian lady. His brother was Cardinal Giambattista Altieri. The Altieri family belonged to the ancient Roman Papal nobility and had enjoyed the highest consideration at Rome for several centuries; they had occasionally contracted alliances with the Colonnas and the Orsinis. During earlier pontificates, the Altieri held many important offices and had been entrusted with several delicate missions.

== Early work ==
Altieri received a doctorate in law from the Roman College in 1611. After finishing his studies, he was named auditor of Giovanni Battista Lancellotti in 1623, in the nuncio of Poland. He was ordained on 6 April 1624. On his return to Rome, he was named Bishop of Camerino, then governor of Loreto and of all Umbria. Pope Urban VIII (1623–44) gave him charge of the works designed to protect the territory of Ravenna from the unruly Po River.

Pope Innocent X (1644–55) sent him as nuncio to Naples, where he remained for eight years. He is credited with the re-establishment of peace after the stormy days of Masaniello. Pope Alexander VII (1655–67) confided to him a mission to Poland.

Pope Clement IX (1667–69) named him Superintendent of the Papal Exchequer (in charge of the Church's finances), and in 1667 his maestro di camera, and he was made Secretary of the Congregation of Bishops and Regulars. Just before his death, Clement IX made him a cardinal. He was then about seventy-nine years of age; and Clement IX, when making him a member of the Sacred College, said to him: "You will be our successor."

After the funeral of Pope Clement IX, sixty-two electors entered into conclave on 20 December 1669. Forty-two votes were necessary, and due to the rivalry between the French and Spanish factions, heated discussion prevailed for four months. Cardinal Giannicolò Conti was supported by twenty-two votes; Cardinal Giacomo Rospigliosi, nephew of the late pope, had thirty, or, as some say, thirty-three, with two at the accesso, so that he needed only seven more votes to gain the tiara. Cardinal Carlo Cerri obtained twenty-three votes.

At length the cardinals agreed to resort to the old expedient of electing a cardinal of advanced years, and proposed Cardinal Altieri, almost an octogenarian, whose long life had been spent in the service of the Catholic Church, and whom Clement IX, on the eve of his death, had raised to the dignity of the purple. The reason a prelate of such transcendent merits received the cardinalate so late in life seems to have been that he had waived his claims to the elevation in favour of an older brother.

== Pontificate ==
On 29 April 1670, the papacy was offered to him by fifty-nine cardinals present at the election; only two being against him. He, however, objected because of his age, for he was almost eighty, and exclaimed, "I am too old to bear such a burden." Pointing to Cardinal Francesco Maria Brancaccio, Altieri said he was the cardinal whom they ought to elect. He persisted in refusing, protesting that he no longer had strength or memory; eventually, with tears he accepted, and out of gratitude to his benefactor, by ten years his junior, he assumed the name of Clement X. He was crowned on 11 May.

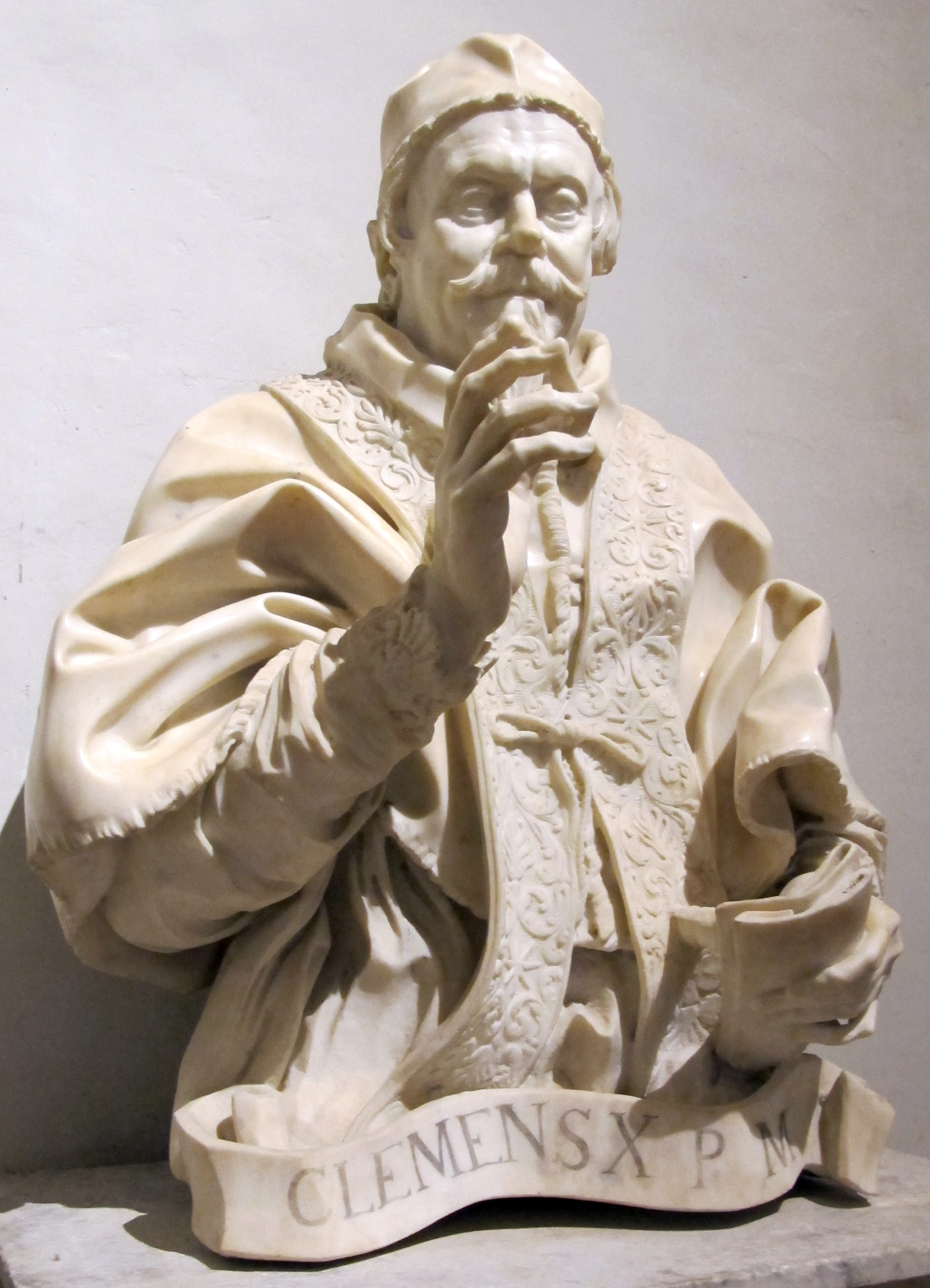
Bust of Pope Clement X by Gian Lorenzo Bernini.

On 8 June Clement X took possession of the Basilica of Saint John Lateran. On 11 June, he confirmed the Minor Observantines in the Holy Land in the privileges and indulgences granted to those who visit the holy places, according to the decrees of Alexander VII and Clement IX. In the same month, he granted to the prelate-clerks of the chamber the use of the violet-coloured band around their hats. Occasionally forgetful, he sometimes promised the same favors to different people and came to rely on his cardinal-nephew, Cardinal Paluzzo Paluzzi Altieri degli Albertoni.

All but one of the male scions of the Altieri family had chosen the ecclesiastical career. On his accession to the papacy, Clement X, in order to save the Altieri name from extinction, adopted the Paoluzzi family, and proposed that one of the Paluzzi should marry Laura Caterina Altieri, the sole heiress of the family. In exchange for adopting the Altieri surname, he would make one of the Paoluzzi a cardinal. Following the wedding, which he officiated, he appointed his niece's uncle-in-law Cardinal Paluzzi Altieri to the office of cardinal nephew to take on the duties which he was prevented from doing by age. The main activity was to invest the Church's money, and with advancing years gradually entrusted to him the management of affairs, to such an extent that the Romans said he had reserved to himself only the episcopal functions of benedicere et sanctificare, resigning in favour of the cardinal the administrative duties of regere et gubernare.

Clement X advised the Christian princes to love each other and to prove it by generous measures, and by a prudent and scrupulous conduct. It was especially between Spain and France that the pope desired to witness a renewal of feelings of good understanding.

In 1671, the Pope published an edict by which he declared that a noble might be a merchant without loss of his nobility, provided always that he did not sell by retail. In 1676, Gian Lorenzo Bernini sculpted one of his final statues, a bust of Clement X.

=== Canonizations and beatifications ===
On 12 April 1671, Clement X canonised five new saints:

- Saint Gaetan of Thiene, founder of the Clerks of Divine Providence, better known by their other title of Theatines.
- Saint Francis Borgia, fourth Duke of Gandia, Marquis of Lombay, and viceroy of Catalonia, born in 1510. He took the habit of the Jesuits in 1547, and became general and one of the most illustrious ornaments of that religious order.
- Saint Philip Benizi, a noble Florentine, a religious of the order of the Servants of Mary, of which he was the reviver, and not, as has been stated by some, the founder. Pope Leo X (1513–21) had beatified him in 1516.
- Saint Louis Beltran, or Bertrand, a Spaniard, of the family of Saint Vincent Ferrer, and like him a Dominican.
- Saint Rose of Lima, of the third order of Saint Dominic, born at Lima, Peru in 1586. Saint Rose, beatified by Clement IX, was the first American saint of the Americas.
- Fernando III called El Santo (the Saint), (1198/1199 – 30 May 1252) was a king of Castile (1217–1252) and Leon (1230–1252). He was the son of Alfonso IX and Berengaria of Castile, daughter of Alfonso VIII. In 1231 he united Castile and León permanently. Fernando was canonized by Pope Clement X in 1671. Several places named San Fernando were founded across the Spanish Empire.

In 1673, he had Pope Leo III's name entered in the Roman Martyrology.

He beatified Pope Pius V (1566–72), Francis Solano, and John of the Cross, all subsequently canonized by Clement XI and Pope Benedict XIII (1724–30). Clement X also declared Venerable one of the famous Spanish mystics, Sister María de Jesús de Ágreda.

Clement X, on 24 November 1673, beatified nineteen Martyrs of Gorkum, who had been taken prisoner at Gorcum, the Netherlands, and put to death in Brielle on 9 July 1572, in hatred of the Catholic faith, of the primacy of the Pope, and of the Roman Church. Of the nineteen Gorcum martyrs, Peter Ascanius (Peter of Assche) and Cornelius Vican (Cornelius van Wijk) were laymen; eleven were Franciscan priests; one a Dominican, two Premonstratensians, one a regular canon of Saint Augustine, and four were secular priests.

On 13 January 1672, Clement X regulated the formalities to be observed in removing the relics of saints from sacred cemeteries. No one was to remove such relics without the permission of the cardinal-vicar. They were not to be exposed for the veneration of the faithful unless previously examined by the same cardinal. The principal relics of the martyr – that is to say, the head, the legs, the arms, and the part in which they suffered – were to be exposed only in the churches, and they were not to be given to private persons, but only to princes and high prelates; and even to them but rarely, lest the too great profusion should deprive relics of the respect which they ought to inspire. The Pope decreed severe penalties against all who gave a relic any name but that given by the cardinal-vicar. The pain of excommunication was pronounced against all who should demand any sum whatever for sealed and authentic relics. These decrees, and others made by preceding Popes were confirmed by Pope Clement XI (1700–21) in 1704.

Clement X confirmed the exemptions granted by Pope Gregory XIII (1572–85) to the German College at Rome in 1671; and then, on 16 October 1672, he ordered the pupils to swear that at the close of their studies they would set out for Germany without a day's delay.

=== Foreign affairs ===
Clement X, seeing the results of the apostolic labours of the early French missionaries in Canada, the number of the faithful, and the wide field of labour, resolved to give the Church an independent organisation, and erected a see at Quebec, the bishop to depend directly on the Holy See; this provision would later secure its permanence after Quebec passed into the hands of Great Britain. The first bishop was Francois de Montmorency-Laval.

In 1673, there arrived at Rome ambassadors from the Tsar of Russia, Alexei. He solicited from the Pope the title of Tsar, which, however, had already been adopted by his predecessors. At the same time it could not be forgotten that he gave strong financial aid to King John III Sobieski of Poland in their fight against the Turkish invaders. But Paul Menesius, a Scotsman, who was the ambassador, could not obtain the grant or sanction of that title, though he was received with great magnificence and had many precious gifts to carry back to his master. The Russian Tsar did not profess the Catholic faith in such a manner as to give any assurance of his intentions, and the King of Poland had looked upon the embassy with displeasure.

Clement X suspended the Portuguese Inquisition on 3 October 1674, challenging the techniques employed against the New Christians. The suspension lasted till 1681.

=== Local administration ===
Meanwhile, Rome had reason to fear trouble. Cardinal Paluzzi Altieri, who was at the head of the government, determined to increase the revenues, and he established a new tax of three percent upon all merchandise entering the city, including even goods for cardinals and ambassadors. Although the government complained that ambassadors had abused their privilege, the diplomatic corps showed discontent that they were not expressly exempted in the new tax law.

Another edict confirmed the first and ordered the confiscation without distinction of all goods that did not pay the new tax. The cardinals at first complained, though with moderation. But the ambassadors didn't speak Clement X's language.

The Cardinal nephew maintained that Clement X, within his own State, might make what rules he pleased. Then the ambassadors of the Empire, of France, Spain, and Venice, sent their secretaries to demand an audience of the Pope. The chief chamberlain replied that the Pope was busy that day. And for four days in succession, the chamberlain gave the same answer to the same applicants. Clement X, learning at length what had occurred, declared that he had given no such order. The ambassadors then sent their secretaries to ask an audience of Cardinal Paluzzi Altieri. Not only did he refuse to admit them, but closed his doors and increased the guard at the pontifical palace, so that the offence could go no further. Subsequently, the Cardinal nephew wrote to the nuncios who resided in the courts of Europe, stating that the excesses committed by the ambassadors had induced the pope to publish the edict. The ambassadors, on the contrary, assured their sovereigns that the accusation was a pretext.

The conflict lasted for more than a year; and Clement X, who loved peace, at length referred the matter to a congregation. Sometime after, Cardinal Paluzzi Altieri declared that he had not intended to comprise the ambassadors among those for whom the edict was intended, and that the pope had never contemplated subjecting them to it.

Queen Christina of Sweden, who had become a Catholic and moved to Rome in December 1655, made Clement X prohibit the custom of chasing Jews through the streets during the carnival. In 1686 she issued a declaration that Roman Jews stood under her protection, signed la Regina – the queen.

=== Jubilee ===
In 1675 Clement X celebrated the fourteenth jubilee of the holy year. Notwithstanding his age, he visited the churches, regretting that the gout prevented him from making that holy visit more than five times. He went twelve times to Trinity hospital to wash the feet of the pilgrims, and after the ceremony gave them liberal alms. A commemorated silver piastra was issued on the occasion of the Holy Year.

=== Cardinals ===
Clement X created 20 cardinals in six consistories including Pietro Francesco Orsini, who would become Pope Benedict XIII several decades later.

== Death ==
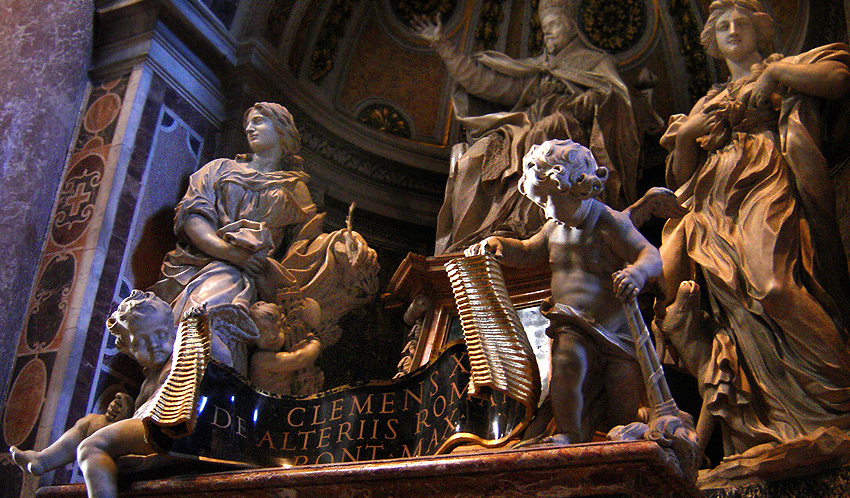
Tomb of Clement X, St. Peter's Basilica, designed by Mattia de' Rossi

On 22 July 1676, the agonies of the gout became so violent that Clement X died under them that afternoon. He was eighty-six years old and had governed the Church six years, two months, and twenty-four days. His tomb is in St. Peter's Basilica.

== Other accomplishments ==
He laboured to preserve the peace of Europe even though he was menaced by the ambition of Louis XIV of France (1643–1715), an imperious monarch over ecclesiastical matters (the struggle concerned the régale, or revenues of vacant dioceses and abbeys, which resulted in continued tension with France). He decorated the Ponte Sant'Angelo with the ten statues of angels in Carrara marble still to be seen there.

Pope Clement X had the two fountains located in St. Peter's Square built near the tribune, where a monument has been erected to his memory. During his papacy, the Palazzo Altieri in central Rome was refurbished.

Clement X appointed Francesco Lorenzo Brancati di Lauria head of the Vatican Library.

== See also ==
- Cardinals created by Clement X

Catholic Church titles
Preceded by Clement IX	Pope; 29 April 1670 – 22 July 1676	Succeeded by Innocent XI
