= Paul Menesius =

Scottish soldier and diplomat (1637–1694)

Paul Menesius (Note: Latinized from Menzies. His last name written in the forms Menzies, Menghes, Meneses.) (1637–1694), also known as Pavel Gavrilovich Menezius (Russian: Павел Гаврилович Менезиус), (Note: Also spelled Menezy (Менезий) or Minnyust (Миннюст).) was a Scottish soldier and diplomat who spent most of his life in the service of Tsar Alexis of Russia.

== Life ==
Menesius came from an old wealthy Scottish family of Catholic and traditional background from Aberdeen, who were forced by religious persecution to immigrate to France in 1639. Menesius studied at the Douai College. After Oliver Cromwell's death in 1658 the family returned to Scotland when Charles II returned the family's land. However, their wealth was lost and Paul, the youngest son, had to seek his own living. He joined the Polish army.

In 1660, he defected to Russia. There, he received a master's rank and later married the daughter of a Dutchman by the name of Peter Marselis who was also in the service of Moscow.

Menzies' friendship with Kirill Naryshkin, who since 1671 was the Tsar's father-in-law, and Patrick Gordon and others placed him close to Tsar Alexei.

When in 1671 - 1672 during a return to Scotland, his fortunes took a further turn. The Russian state was looking for allies among the European states to fight Turkey. Menesius with his linguistic skills and Catholic faith was enlisted as an ambassador and sent in 1672, to Berlin, Dresden, Vienna, Venice and Rome. Although he was welcomed, he did not receive any direct response to the appeal for alliance. However, despite Austrian suspicion; in Vienna when he announced that the Turks had conquered the Kamenets and Russian arsenals, the Austrian Emperor led an army to the borders to defeat the infidel invader.

== Meeting with the pope ==
On the embassy to Rome in 1673, the legate was warmly welcomed. Menesius delivered a letter from Tsar Alexei to Pope Clement X requesting his help against their common enemy the Turk and asking him to intercede and write to the Kings of England and France that they might aid him against the enemies of Christians. He was also to solicit the Pope on behalf of Alexis for formal recognition of the title of Tsar. Rome recognized Alexis only as the Grand duke of Muscovy, who had conferred the title of Tsar upon himself. The Pope was not convinced that Alexis professed the faith in such a manner as to give any assurance of his Catholic intentions. However, an audience was refused when Menzies would not agree to kiss the Pope's foot. Despite an attempt to arrange a secret audience, the negotiations ended unsuccessfully.

== Later life ==
On his return to Russia in 1674 he was promoted to the rank of major general and was made a tutor for the Tsarevich Peter (the future Peter I) in military matters; consisting mainly of rowdy outdoor games with live ammunition.

Come 1682, the regent Sophia Alekseyevna sent him off to war against the Crimean Tatars.

In 1684, along with Patrick Gordon and Alexander Livingston, fellow Scottish soldiers in the Tsar's service, Menesius signed a petition for the opening of a first Roman Catholic congregation in Russia. The permission was granted. This was the first time that a Roman Catholic church was built in Moscow.

By the summer of 1689, Peter took power from his half-sister Sophia, whose position had been weakened by two unsuccessful Crimean campaigns.

Menesius, till his death in 1694, enthusiastically defended the interests of Russia, but still remained a staunch Catholic and Scottish patriot.

== See also ==
- Patrick Gordon

== Sources ==
- "Менезиус, Павел" . Brockhaus and Efron Encyclopedic Dictionary (in Russian). 1906.
- Костомаров Н. "15. Петр Великий". История России в жизнеописаниях ее главнейших деятелей (in Russian).
- "Neue Seite 6" ПАТРИК ГОРДОН:ДНЕВНИК/Комментарии (in Russian).
- Scottish Influence in Russian History, A. Francis Steuart (1913), Chapter IV: General Patrick Gordon of Auchleuchries.
- "Paul Menzies and his mission from Muscovy to Rome, 1672-1674" Paul Dukes in The Innes Review, XXXV (Autumn 1984), pp. 88–95. [Z]
- Passages from the diary of General Patrick Gordon of Auchleuchries : A.D. 1635-A.D. 1699; Aberdeen : Printed for the Spalding Club, 1859 archive.org: pp. 39, 40, 41, 46, 53, 84, 85, 111, 113, 163, 178, 183, 213; index: 229)
